= Clark =

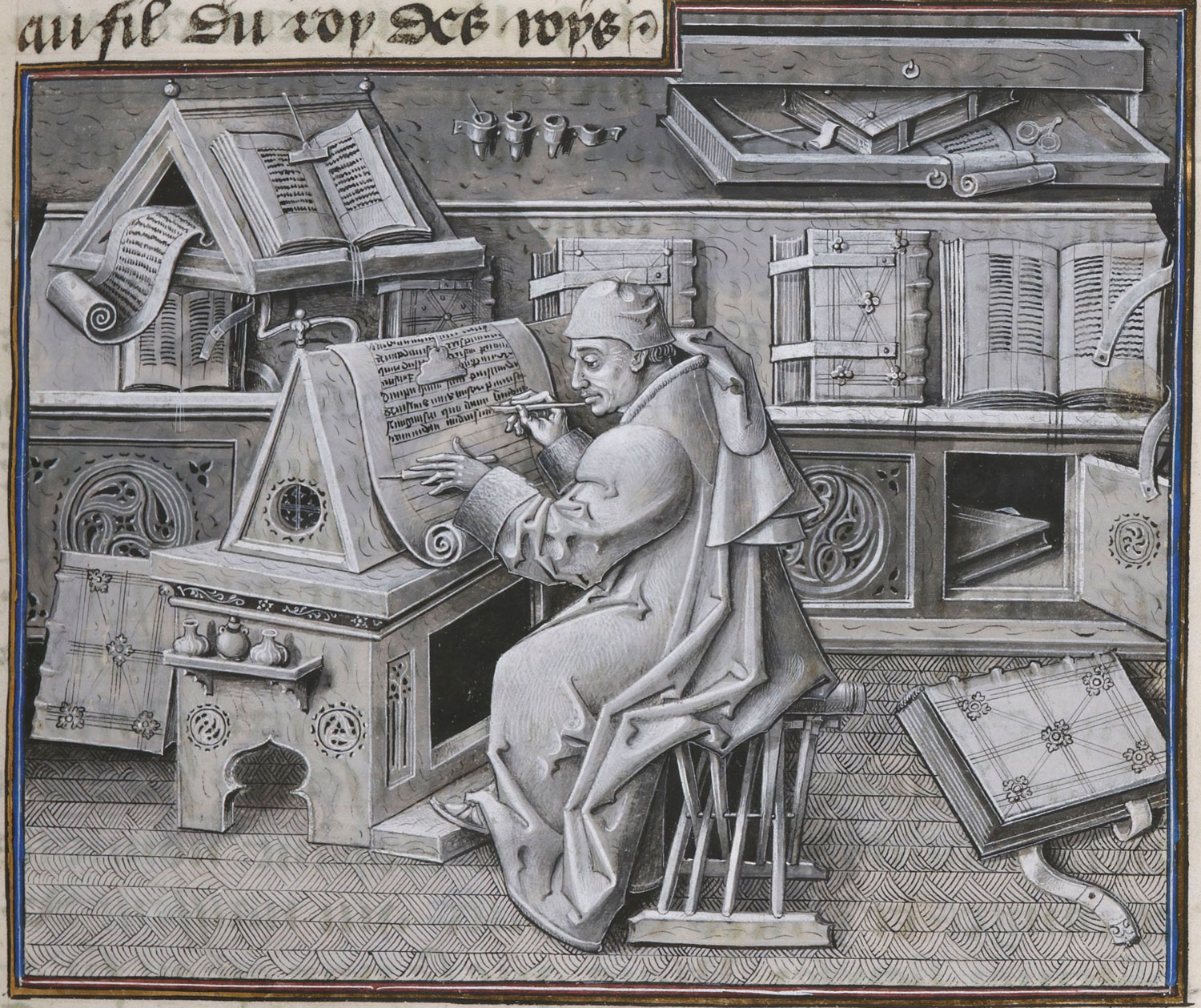
- A scribe or clerk, the occupation from which the name derives

Origin
- Language: Old English
- Meaning: Clerk, scribe, secretary
- Region of origin: England

Other names
- Variant forms: Clarke, Clerk, O'Cleary, Cleary

Clark is an English language surname with historical links to England, Scotland and Ireland that is ultimately derived from the Latin clericus meaning "scribe", "secretary" or a scholar within a religious order, referring to someone who was educated. Clark evolved from "clerk". The first records of the name are found in 12th-century England. The name has many variants. It is often used as the anglicized variant of the Irish O'Cleary or Cleary.

Clark is the twenty-seventh most common surname in the United Kingdom, including placing fourteenth in Scotland.

According to the 1990 United States census, Clark was the twenty-first most frequently encountered surname, accounting for 0.23% of the population. According to the 2010 United States census, Clark was the thirtieth most frequent surname, with a count of 562,679.

== Disambiguation pages ==
- Andrew Clark (disambiguation)
- Anne Clark (disambiguation)
- Brian Clark (disambiguation)
- Bud Clark (disambiguation)
- Cameron Clark (disambiguation)
- Charles Clark (disambiguation)
- Chris Clark (disambiguation)
- Clive Clark (disambiguation)
- Colin Clark (disambiguation)
- Dave Clark (disambiguation)
- David Clark (disambiguation)
- Dick Clark (disambiguation)
- Douglas Clark (disambiguation)
- Edward Clark (disambiguation)
- Eugene Clark (disambiguation)
- George Clark (disambiguation)
- Gregory Clark (disambiguation)
- Jack Clark (disambiguation)
- James Clark (disambiguation)
- Jason Clark (disambiguation)
- Jeff Clark (disambiguation)
- Jim Clark (disambiguation)
- John Clark (disambiguation)
- Jonathan Clark (disambiguation)
- Jordan Clark (disambiguation)
- Joseph Clark (disambiguation)
- Kate Clark (disambiguation)
- Ken Clark (disambiguation)
- Kenneth Clark (disambiguation)
- Lee Clark (disambiguation)
- Mary Clark (disambiguation)
- Max Clark (disambiguation)
- Paul Clark (disambiguation)
- Peter Clark (disambiguation)
- Robert Clark (disambiguation)
- Ryan Clark (disambiguation)
- Sally Clark (disambiguation)
- Samuel Clark (disambiguation)
- Simon Clark (disambiguation)
- Stephen Clark (disambiguation)
- Terry Clark (disambiguation)
- Thomas Clark (disambiguation)
- William Clark (disambiguation)

== Arts and literature ==
- Alton Dorian Clark (born 1984), better known as American hip-hop musician Dorian
- Annie Erin Clark (born 1982), better known as St. Vincent, American singer, songwriter, and musician
- Appleton P. Clark Jr. (1865–1955), American architect
- Blake Clark (born 1946), American actor and stand-up comedian
- Bob Clark (Benjamin "Bob" Clark) (1939–2007), American director
- Buddy Clark (1911–1949), American singer
- Catherine Clark (born 1976), Canadian television host
- Cheryl Clark (born 1973), American singer, Electric Slide (Shall We Dance) additional vocals
- Christian Clark (born 1978), Australian actor
- Christopher Clark (born 1979), British musician performing as Clark and earlier as Chris Clark
- Claudine Clark (born 1941), American R&B singer and performer of the 1962 hit record "Party Lights"
- Dane Clark (1912–1998), American character actor
- Dodie Clark (born 1995), English musician, YouTuber, and author
- Donté Clark, American poet, actor
- Dorothy Park Clark (1899–1983), American novelist who wrote under the pen name Clark McMeekin
- Ernest Clark (1912–1994), British actor
- Felicia Buttz Clark (1862–1931), American writer
- Florence Anderson Clark (1835–1918), American author, newspaper editor, librarian, university dean
- Gladys Clark (1918–2011), Cajun spinner and weaver
- Guy Clark (1941–2016), American musician, songwriter, recording artist, and performer
- Harriet E. Clark (1850–1945), American teacher and author
- Helen Taggart Clark (1849–1918), American journalist, poet
- Hilda Clark (soprano) (1872–1932), American soprano, actress, model, and Coca-Cola advertising spokesperson
- Hilda Margery Clarke (1926–2022), English painter and curator
- Jean Clark (artist) (1902–1999), English artist
- Joseph Benwell Clark (1857–1938), English artist
- Joshua Clark (born 1980), American writer
- Ken Clark (actor) (1921–2009), American actor
- Laura Lee Clark (born 1964), American interior designer
- Leah Clark, American voice actor
- Libby Clark (1917–2012), American journalist
- Louis Clark (1947–2021), musician and conductor with The Orchestra (successor band to ELO and ELO Part II)
- Marcia Clark (artist) (born 1938), American artist
- Maudemarie Clark (born 1945), American philosopher
- Petula Clark (born 1932), British singer, actress, and songwriter
- Robin Clark, American vocalist
- Robin Clark (pop singer) (born 1949), 1960s American pop singer
- Roy Clark (1933–2018), American singer and musician
- Spencer Treat Clark (born 1987), American actor
- Stephen R. L. Clark (born 1945), English philosopher
- Steve Clark (1960–1991), British guitarist for Def Leppard
- Terri Clark (born 1968), Canadian singer
- Tom Clark (journalist), Canadian television journalist
- Vicky A. Clark, American art curator
- Vinnie B. Clark (1878–1971), American educator and author
- Wallis Clark (1882–1961), English actor
- William Clark (artist) (1803–1883), Scottish artist

== Business ==
- Allen George Clark (1898–1962), British businessman
- Arnold Clark (1927–2017), Scottish businessman
- Daniel Clark Sr. (1732–1800), Irish-American businessman
- Jonas Gilman Clark (1815–1900), American businessman and the founder of Clark University
- Lance Clark (1936–2018), English businessman, of the shoe retailers Clarks
- Myron Henry Clark (1881–1953), American management consultant
- Shawn M. Clark (born c. 1964), American organizational theorist
- Wilbur Clark (1908–1965), American businessman and owner of hotels and casinos

== Politics and law ==
- Abraham Clark (1725–1794), American politician and Revolutionary War figure
- Alan Clark (1928–1999), British Conservative politician and author, son of Kenneth Clark
- Alice Pollard Clark (born 1940), American jurist
- Alistair Clark, Lord Clark (fl. 2016), Scottish judge, senator of the College of Justice
- Augusta Clark (1932–2013), American librarian, lawyer and politician
- Barbara M. Clark (1939–2016), New York politician
- Benjamin S. W. Clark (1829–1912), New York politician
- Billy J. Clark (1778–1866), New York physician and politician
- Boyd A. Clark (1918–1978), American politician and jurist
- Chantelle Nickson-Clark, American politician
- Darius Clark (1798–1871), New York physician and politician
- Frank M. Clark (1915–2003), American Congressman
- Gavin Brown Clark (1846–1930), MP for Caithness
- Greenleaf Clark (1835–1904), American jurist
- Helen Clark (born 1950), prime minister of New Zealand from 1999 to 2008
- Horace Clark (assemblyman), 1830s New York politician
- Horace F. Clark (1815–1873), US Congressman from New York
- Isabella Clark (1809–1857), wife of Prime Minister of Canada Sir John A. Macdonald
- Janet H. Clark (born 1941), Minnesota politician
- Joe Clark (born 1939), Canadian politician and government minister, prime minister 1979–1980
- Karen Clark (American politician) (1945–2026), politician from Minnesota
- Karen Clark (British politician), politician and the mayor of North Tyneside, England
- Katy Clark (born 1967), Scottish politician and trade union official
- Kelly Clark (lawyer) (1957–2013), American lawyer
- Marcia Clark (born 1953), American lawyer and author
- Maureen Harding Clark (born 1946), Irish jurist
- Myron H. Clark (1806–1892), governor of New York
- Newcomb Clark (1840–1913), Michigan politician
- Orville Clark (1801–1862), New York politician
- Ramsey Clark (1927–2021), US attorney general and activist
- Rita Clark (1915–2008), member of the Pennsylvania House of Representatives
- Ruth H. Clark (1916–2022), American politician
- Satterlee Clark, American politician
- Septima Poinsette Clark (1898–1987), American educator and voting registration leader
- Sir Terence Clark (born 1934), British diplomat and writer
- Tom C. Clark (1899–1977), US attorney general, U.S. Supreme Court justice
- Valerie Clark, American politician
- Wilson Hart Clark (1820–1887), American politician and lawyer from Connecticut
- Zenas Clark (1795–1864), New York politician

== Science and medicine ==
- Adam Clark, American meteorologist
- Benjamin Preston Clark (1860–1939), American entomologist
- Bracy Clark (1771–1860), English veterinary surgeon specialising in the horse
- Cynthia Clark (born 1942), American statistician
- Daniel Kinnear Clark (1822–1896), Scottish railway mechanical engineer
- Duncan W. Clark (1910–2007), American public health specialist
- Gerry Clark (1927–1999), New Zealand sailor and ornithologist
- Grahame Clark (1907–1995), British archaeologist
- Hamlet Clark (1823–1867), English entomologist
- Hilda Clark (doctor) (1881–1955), British Quaker physician and humanitarian
- Hubert Lyman Clark (1870–1947), American zoologist
- Jeanne Clark, American internist and physician-scientist
- John F. Clark (engineer) (1920–?), American engineer and NASA director
- Judson Freeman Clark (1870–1942), Canadian forester and mycologist
- Judy MacArthur Clark, British veterinarian
- Kara Clark, American wind turbine researcher
- Leslie J. Clark (1924–2003), British engineer, founder of Parvalux
- Lynn G. Clark (born 1956), American botanist
- Noel A. Clark (born 1940), American physicist
- Wilfrid Le Gros Clark (1895–1971), British palaeoanthropologist

== Sports ==
- Alijah Clark (born 2003), American football player
- Alysha Clark (born 1987), American-Israeli basketball player
- Babe Clark, American football player
- Bobby Clark (footballer, born 2005), English footballer
- Caitlin Clark (born 2002), American basketball player
- Calum Clark (born 1989), English rugby union player
- Carmel Clark (born 1965), New Zealand swimmer
- Christian Clark (American football) (born 2006), American football player
- Chuck Clark (born 1995), American football player
- Chuck Clark (ice hockey) (1891–1970), British-born Canadian ice hockey player
- Ciaran Clark (born 1989), Irish football player
- Clarence Clark (1859–1937), American tennis player
- Clark, the Chicago Cubs mascot
- Cora Mildred Maris Clark (1885–1967), New Zealand hockey player and nurse
- Corrie Clark (born 1982), American breaststroke swimmer
- Dallas Clark, American football player
- Damone Clark (born 2000), American football player
- Daniel Clark (born 1988), British basketball player
- Darion Clark (born 1994), American football player
- Duncan Clark (athlete) (1915–2003), Scottish hammer thrower
- Dwight Clark (1957–2018), American football player
- Earl Clark (born 1988), American basketball player
- Elky Clark (1898–1956), Scottish boxer of the 1920s
- Emily Clark (born 1995), Canadian ice hockey player
- Erin Clark (born 1997), New Zealand and Samoa rugby player
- Frank Clark (footballer), English football player
- Ginger Clark (1879–1943), American baseball pitcher
- Glenn Clark (born 1969), Canadian coach of Toronto Rock
- Hannah Clark (born 1990), English cricketer
- Hudson Clark (born 2001), American football player
- Jacob Clark (born 2000), American football player
- Jadrian Clark (born 1994), American football player
- Jaylen Clark (born 2001), American basketball player
- Jenna Clark (born 2001), Scottish footballer
- Jeremy Clark (defensive back) (born 1994), American football player
- Jerrod Clark (born 1999), American football player
- Kei'Trel Clark (born 2001), American football player
- Kelly Clark (born 1983), American snowboarder
- Kihei Clark (born 2000), American–Filipino basketball player
- Le'Raven Clark (born 1993), American football player
- Leon Clark (basketball), American basketball player
- Lex Clark (1943–2025), New Zealand rower
- Ocky Clark (born 1960), American middle-distance runner
- Otey Clark (1915–2010), American baseball pitcher
- R. Foster Clark, American college sports coach
- Ranza Clark (born 1961), Canadian middle-distance runner
- Roger Clark (rally driver), British rally driver
- Sherm Clark (1899–1980), American Olympic rower and rear admiral
- Stuart Clark (born 1975), Australian cricketer
- Wendel Clark (born 1966), Canadian ice hockey player
- Will Clark (born 1964), American baseball player
- Zoey Clark (born 1994), British sprinter

== Other ==
- Alice Clark (historian) (1874–1934), English suffragist and historian
- Alister Clark (1864–1949), Australian rose-breeder
- Annie W. Clark (1843–1907), American social reformer
- Carlos Clark Van Leer (1865–1953), American military officer
- Clark Olofsson (born 1947), Swedish criminal
- Davis Wasgatt Clark (1812–1871), American bishop of the Methodist Episcopal Church
- Felton Grandison Clark (1903–1970), African-American university president
- Graham Clark (tenor) (1941–2023), English tenor
- Hadden Clark (born 1952), American serial killer
- Harold M. Clark (1890–1919), American army major
- Hugh Massey Clark (1886–1956), New York philatelist
- Hulda Regehr Clark, (1928–2009), Canadian alternative medicine practitioner
- Joseph Samuel Clark (1871–1944), African-American university president
- Manning Clark (1915–1991), Australian historian
- Mark W. Clark (1896–1984), American army general in World War 2 (Italy) and the Korean War
- Nada Hazel Clark (1922–1964), New Zealand trade unionist
- Nancy B. Clark, Massachusetts philatelist, president of Cardinal Spellman Philatelic Museum
- R. Scott Clark (born 1961), American seminary professor
- Theresa Mathilde Clark (c. 1890–1953), New York philatelist, spouse of Hugh Massey Clark
- Wesley Clark (born 1944), American army general in the Vietnam War and Kosovo
- Zammis Clark (born 1994), British computer security specialist convicted of computer hacking

== Fictional characters ==
- Clark Griswold, fictional character from National Lampoon's Vacation film series
- Clark Kent, secret identity of DC Superhero Superman
- John Clark (Tom Clancy character), character in Tom Clancy's Ryanverse
- Tracy Clark (90210), fictional character from The CW primetime drama 90210

== See also ==
- Clark (taxonomic authority)
- Clark (TV series), Swedish TV drama series produced by Netflix
- Justice Clark (disambiguation)
- Karen Clark Sheard (born 1960), American Grammy Award-winning singer
- The Clark Sisters, American gospel vocalists from Detroit
