= Andrew Winer =

American novelist

Andrew Winer (born June 1966) is an American novelist. Recipient of a National Endowment for the Arts Fellowship in Fiction and author of the novels The Marriage Artist (2010) and The Color Midnight Made (2003), he writes and speaks about literary, philosophical, and artistic matters. Presently he is completing his third novel and a book on the contemporary relevance of Friedrich Nietzsche’s central philosophical idea, the affirmation of life. Andrew Winer is also an artist.

== Life and work ==
Winer studied painting at the University of California, Los Angeles, and at the California Institute of the Arts. He had a number of solo and group shows in Los Angeles and New York City, and wrote criticism and reviews for Art Issues before beginning his literary career. In 2000, he received an MFA in Creative Writing at the University of California, Irvine, and, two years later, published his first novel, The Color Midnight Made, an acclaimed national bestseller.

In 2004, he received a National Endowment for the Arts Fellowship for Fiction, and a literary residency at Literar-Mechana in Vienna, Austria, where he started research for his second novel, The Marriage Artist, published in 2010 by Henry Holt and Co., and republished in a hardcover edition by Picador in 2011.

Winer has conducted public conversations with writers such as Rachel Cusk, Colm Toibin, Adam Zagajewski, Geoff Dyer, Akwaeke Emezi, Jane Smiley, Will Self, and Juan Felipe Herrera. He has given talks on artists such as Marsden Hartley, Ellsworth Kelly, and Martin Johnson Heade, and on writers such as Fernando Pessoa and Emil Cioran. His philosophical work is focused on Friedrich Nietzsche. With Nietzsche scholar Maudemarie Clark, he is writing a book on Nietzsche for Oxford University Press.

He has also written extensively for art catalogs and national and international art publications such as BLAU INTERNATIONAL or Gagosian Quarterly. Some of the artists he has written about include Vija Celmins, Eric Fischl, Jean-Baptiste-Siméon Chardin, Harold Ancart, Nathaniel Mary Quinn, and Glenn Brown.

Winer is Associate Professor of Creative Writing at the University of California, Riverside.

== Bibliography ==
=== Novels ===
- The Marriage Artist. Henry Holt & Company. New York. 2010. Hardcover. 384p. ISBN 978-0-8050-9178-6.
- The Color Midnight Made. New York: Simon & Schuster. 2002. Hardcover. 258p. ISBN 0743439902.

=== Selected essays and stories ===
- "The Grandeur of Standing Alone - what we can learn from Hadrian." BLAU INTERNATIONAL. Issue 12. 2025.
- "Silence, Time, And Making Matter Matter - on the work of Vija Celmins." BLAU INTERNATIONAL. Issue 10. Summer 2024, pp. 110–123.
- "The interpreter of crisscrossing subjectivities." Pessoa Plural. Issue 21. 2022, pp. 480–485.
- "Simply Nietzsche: A Review." with Maudemarie Clark. The Philosophers' Magazine. Issue 91, 4th Quarter. 2020, pp. 115–118.
- "Remembering Philip Roth." Los Angeles Review of Books. 2018.
- "The Pain of the Wound and the Balm of Having Understood the Gods." Pessoa Plural. Issue 14. 2018, pp. 394–397.
- "On Fernando Pessoa." BOMB Magazine. 2017.
- "Loneliness and Politics with E.M. Cioran." with Martin, C. Tin House, 2017.
- "Zijn Nood is de Onze" (His Need is Our Need, translated into Dutch by Gerda Baardman). Nexus 55. The Netherlands. 2010, pp. 165–167.
- "Darmstadt." T. Jefferson Parker, ed. (2010). Hook, Line & Sinister: Short Stories (hardcover ed.). Vermont/New York: Countryman Press/W. W. Norton & Company. pp. 97–118.
- "The Fish Whisperer." Faultline - Journal of Art & Literature Vol. 14: 2005, pp. 122–128.
- Robert C. Morgan, ed. (2002). "Bruce Nauman". ART + PERFORMANCE: Bruce Nauman. Johns Hopkins University Press. pp. 206–207.
- "Death, Desire, and Honor in the films of John Woo." New Fat Magazine Vol. 1: 1, 1994, pp. 33–34.
- "The Photography of Richard Misrach." Art Issues 18, 1991, p. 23.
- "Bruce Nauman." Art Issues 17, 1991, p. 32.
- "Neue Sachlickkeit: German Photography." Art Issues 16, 1991, p. 36.
- "Fred Fehlau." Art Issues 16, 1991, p. 34.
- "Riding with Spyder." CalArts Literary Journal. 400 Rubs, 1990, pp. 53–59.

== Public conversations and talks ==
- "Shadow Art: Influences and Inspirations." April 2022, Santa Barbara Art Museum. Santa Barbara, CA.
- "Writing Love in the Face of Disaster: Juan Felipe Herrera and Andrew Winer." March 2020, Santa Barbara Art Museum. Santa Barbara, CA.
- "Love Comes First Beauty Follows: Jane Smiley & Andrew Winer." February 2020, Santa Barbara Art Museum. Santa Barbara, CA.
- "Dismantling Hierarchies: Alex Espinoza and Andrew Winer." March 2019, Santa Barbara Art Museum. Santa Barbara, CA.
- "On Marsden Hartley." October 2018, Docent Council Lecture, Santa Barbara Museum of Art. Santa Barbara, CA.
- Public Conversation with novelist Akwaeke Emezi. September 2018, Internationales Literaturfestival Berlin. Peter-Weiss-Stiftung für Kunst und Politik e.V., Berlin, Germany.
- "Poetry as Portraiture: Adam Zagajewski and Andrew Winer." April 2018, Santa Barbara Art Museum. Santa Barbara, CA.
- "Should We Praise the Mutilated World?: Poetry from California to Krakow": Robert Hass and Adam Zagajewski with Andrew Winer. April 2018. ALOUD Library Foundation of Los Angeles. Los Angeles, CA.
- "On Martin Johnson Heade." February 2018, Santa Barbara Museum of Art. Santa Barbara, CA.
- "The Pain of the Hurt Being Compensated by the Pride of Having Understood the Gods: Why Emil Cioran and Fernando Pessoa, Among All Writers, Offer Supreme Company to the Contemporary Novelist." International Symposium "Cioran and Pessoa - Two Exegetes of Infelicity" ("Cioran şi Pessoa - doi exegeţi ai nefericirii"). National Foundation for Science and Art, National Museum of Romanian Literature, Romanian Academy - Department of Philology and Literature, Faculty of Letters - University of Bucharest, French Embassy in Romania, the French Institute in Bucharest, the National Museum of Art of Romania. November 2016, Bucharest, Romania.
- "Longing and Disappointment: Geoff Dyer and Andrew Winer." October 2016, Santa Barbara Art Museum. Santa Barbara, CA.
- "On Art, Fiction, and Henry James: Colm Tóibín and Andrew Winer in Conversation." June 2016, Santa Barbara Art Museum, Santa Barbara, CA.
