= Laura Clark =

Laura Clark or Laura Clarke may refer to:

- Laura Clarke (born 1978), British diplomat and environmental lawyer
- Laura Guido-Clark, American product designer
- Laura I. Clarke, American nanoscientist
- Laura Jane Clark, British architect, TV presenter and author
- Laura Lee Clark (born 1964), American interior designer
