= Judge Clarke =

Judge Clarke may refer to:

- Jessica G. L. Clarke (born 1983), judge of the United States District Court for the Southern District of New York
- John Hessin Clarke (1857–1945), judge of the United States District Court for the Northern District of Ohio before becoming a justice of the United States Supreme Court
- Joseph Calvitt Clarke Jr. (1920–2004), judge of the United States District Court for the Eastern District of Virginia
- Thurmond Clarke (1902–1971), judge of the United States District Courts for the Southern and Central Districts of California

== See also ==
- Judge Clark
- Justice Clarke (disambiguation)
- Justice Clark
