= Andrew John Clarke =

Andrew John Clarke may refer to:

- Andrew Clarke (cricketer, born 1975) (born Andrew John Clarke), English cricketer
- Andy C (born Andrew John Clarke), English DJ

== See also ==
- Andrew Clarke (disambiguation)
