= Kelly Clark (disambiguation) =

Kelly Clark (born 1983) is an American snowboarder.

Kelly Clark may also refer to:

- Kelly Clark (footballer) (born 1994), Scottish footballer (Celtic, national team)
- Kelly Clark (lawyer) (1957–2013), American lawyer and state representative in Oregon
- Kelly Clark (Canadian politician), a Progressive Conservative Party candidate for the Provencher district in Manitoba in the 1993 Canadian federal election
- Kelly J. Clark, American physician and psychiatrist
- Kelly James Clark (born 1956), American philosopher
- Kelly Nelon Clark (1959–2024), American inspirational Christian and southern gospel vocalist
