= Hilda Clark =

Hilda Clark may refer to:

- Hilda Clark (soprano) (1872–1932), American soprano, actress, model, and Coca-Cola promoter
- Hilda Clark (doctor) (1881–1955), British doctor and humanitarian aid worker

== See also ==
- Hilda Margery Clarke (1926–2022), English painter and curator
