= Colin Clarke =

Colin Clarke may refer to:

- Colin Clarke (footballer, born 1946), Scottish football player and manager
- Colin Clarke (footballer, born 1962), Northern Irish football player and manager
- Colin Clarke (rugby league), English rugby league footballer of the 1960s and 1970s
- Colin P. Clarke, American political scientist and national security studies scholar

== See also ==
- Colin Clark (disambiguation)
