= Anna Clark =

Anna Clark may refer to:

- Anna Clark (model) (born 1966), American model
- Anna Clark (Australian historian), Australian historian and historiographer
- Anna Clark (British historian) (born 1974), ancient historian
- Anna Clark (actress) (fl. 1911), actress; see The Fishermaid of Ballydavid

== See also ==
- Anne Clark (disambiguation)
- Anna Clarke, British author
