= Kon Trubkovich =

American painter and video artist (born 1979)

- Born: Konstantin Trubkovich; 1979 (age 46–47); Moscow, Soviet Union
- Education: Self-taught
- Known for: Painting, video art
- Website: www.trubkovich.com

Kon Trubkovich (born 1979, Moscow) is an American painter and video artist based in Brooklyn, New York. His paintings are based on stills from degraded video footage, rendered in oil on canvas. His work is held in the permanent collections of the Whitney Museum of American Art, the Institute of Contemporary Art, Miami, the Hood Museum of Art, the Joslyn Art Museum, and the Santa Barbara Museum of Art.

== Early life and education ==
Trubkovich was born in Moscow in 1979 and emigrated to the United States, settling in New York. He is self-taught.

== Work ==
Trubkovich's paintings are derived from degraded video footage, including recorded broadcasts, surveillance stills, and home videos, that he pauses, distorts, and transcribes into oil on canvas. His interest in degraded signal can be compared to the experience of emigration and reconstructed memory.

He has worked primarily from analogue sources such as VHS, rendering individual pixels as discrete brushstrokes and reproducing the scan lines, static, and signal dropout of the source medium. His work has been described as paintings that "translate the wobble and decay of analog video into oil paint with a kind of forensic patience."

=== Reception ===
His 2008 exhibition Almost Nowhere at Marianne Boesky Gallery was reviewed in The New York Times by Roberta Smith who observed that this works dealt with incarceration in a metaphorical manner that was "industrious but derivative", further noting that "Trubkovich has not yet escaped the confines of familiar conventions.". Writing on his 2012 exhibition Leap Second in Art in America, Aimee Walleston placed his pixel-by-pixel rendering of paused VHS frames within the "realm of near-pure to pure abstraction". Reviewing the 2014 exhibition Snow for Artforum, Anne Prentnieks compared his treatment of mediated imagery to Gerhard Richter's photographic paintings.

== Exhibitions ==
In 2006, Trubkovich had a solo exhibition, No Country for Old Men, at P.S.1 Contemporary Art Center in New York. In 2015, the Joslyn Art Museum in Omaha presented a solo exhibition of his work.

His work has been included in group exhibitions at the Kunstmuseum Bern in Switzerland (2006); the 2nd Moscow Biennale of Contemporary Art (2007) as part of Uncertain States of America; the MACRO Future Museum in Rome (2009) and the Garage Museum of Contemporary Art in Moscow (2011); and a three-person Emerge Selections presentation at the Museum of Contemporary Art, Chicago in 2013.

In 2021, Trubkovich presented a solo exhibition, The Antepenultimate End, at Gagosian gallery in New York.

== Fellowship award ==
In 2009, Trubkovich received the Emerging Artist Fellowship at Socrates Sculpture Park, New York.

== Collections ==
Trubkovich's work is held in the permanent collections of the Whitney Museum of American Art in New York, the Institute of Contemporary Art, Miami, the Hood Museum of Art at Dartmouth College, the Joslyn Art Museum in Omaha, and the Santa Barbara Museum of Art.

== Publications ==
- Six Feet Under: Autopsy of Our Relation to the Dead (Kunstmuseum Bern / Kerber Verlag, Bielefeld, 2006). ISBN 978-3-86678-019-4.
- The Library of Babel: In and Out of Place (Zabludowicz Collection, London, 2010). ISBN 978-0-9556629-8-0.
- Leap Second, edited by Cay Sophie Rabinowitz (OSMOS Books, New York, 2014). ISBN 978-0-9883404-8-0.
