= Josh Clarke =

Josh or Joshua Clark(e) may refer to:

- Joshua G. Clarke (c. 1780–1828), judge in Mississippi
- Josh Clarke (baseball) (1879–1962), American baseball outfielder
- Josh Clark (actor) (born 1955), American stage and screen actor
- Josh Clarke (footballer, born 1994), English footballer
- Josh Clarke (footballer, born 2004), Northern Irish footballer
- Josh Clarke (athlete) (born 1995), Australian sprinter
- Josh Clark (host) (fl. 2000s–2010s), host of the Stuff You Should Know podcast
- Joshua Clark (fl. 2000s), American author, editor and publisher
- Josh Clark (politician), (born 1980), American politician
