= Anne Clark =

Ann, Anne or Annie Clark may refer to:

- Annie Clark (physician) (1844–1925), Scottish medical doctor
- Ann Nolan Clark (1896–1995), American writer
- Anne Clark (netball) (1903–1983), Australian sportswoman
- Anne Clark Martindell (1914–2008, née Clark), American politician
- Anne Rogers Clark (1929–2006), American dog breeder and show judge
- Anne Clark (poet) (born 1960), English poet, songwriter and electronic musician
- Anne Erin "Annie" Clark (born 1982), known as St. Vincent, American musician
- Annie E. Clark (born 1989), women's rights campaigner
- Annie W. Clark (1843–1907), American social reformer
- Annie Clark (actress) (born 1992), Canadian actress known for Degrassi: The Next Generation

== See also ==
- Anne Clarke (disambiguation)
- Anna Clark (disambiguation)
