= David Clark =

David or Dave Clark may refer to:

== Music ==
- Dave Clark (Canadian musician), former member of Rheostatics
- Dave Clark (musician) (born 1939), English drummer with the Dave Clark Five and leads the band
- Dave Clark (promoter) (1909–1995), African-American record promoter and songwriter

== Politics ==
- David Clark, Baron Clark of Windermere (born 1939), British politician
- Dave Clark (Canadian politician), Progressive Conservative Canadian politician
- David Clark (Florida politician) (1926–2015), American politician from the state of Florida
- David M. Clark (politician) (1824–1907), American politician in Iowa
- D. Worth Clark (1902–1955), U.S. representative and senator representing Idaho
- David Clark (New Zealand politician) (born 1973), Labour MP for Dunedin North since 2011
- David Clark (Georgia politician) (born 1986), Republican state representative for Georgia's 100th District
- David Clark (Utah politician) (born 1953), Republican state representative for Utah's 74th District

== Sports ==
- Dave Clark (baseball) (born 1962), baseball player
- David Clark (cricketer) (1919–2013), English cricketer
- David Clark (footballer, born 1878), Irish footballer
- Dave Clark (pole vaulter) (1936–2018), American Olympic athlete
- David Clark (racing driver) (born 1978), Australian race car driver
- David Clark (rower) (born 1959), Olympic silver medal winner
- David Clark (rugby union) (born 1940), former Australian rugby union footballer and current coach
- Dave Clark (sprinter), Scottish athlete at the 1990 Commonwealth Games
- Dave Clark (television presenter), presenter on Sky Sports
- David K. Clark (born 1953), British-born jockey
- Dave Clark (rugby league) (born 1971), rugby league player and coach

== Others ==
- Dave Clark, the Midnight comic book superhero
- David Clark (ship), a convict ship
- David Clark, 2008 winner of BBC's Mastermind quiz show
- David Clark (cartoonist), American illustrator
- David Aaron Clark (1960–2009), pornographic actor and director
- David B. Clark, American Latter Day Saint leader
- David D. Clark (born 1944), American Internet pioneer
- David Delano Clark (1924–1997), American physicist
- David H. Clark (1943–2025), New Zealand-born British astronomer
- David L. Clark (1864–1939), Pittsburgh businessman and inventor of the Clark bar
- David Leigh Clark, American paleontologist
- David Clark (psychiatrist) (1920–2010), British psychiatrist who pioneered therapeutic communities in mental hospitals
- David M. Clark (born 1954), British psychologist
- David W. Clark, educator, media executive, and president (2003-2009) of Palm Beach Atlantic University

== See also ==
- David Clark Company, a manufacturer of headphones used in professional applications
- The Dave Clark Five, an English rock band
- David Clarke (disambiguation)
