= Simon Clarke =

Simon Clarke may refer to:

- Simon Clarke (footballer) (born 1971), English footballer
- Simon Clarke (politician) (born 1984), British Conservative MP
- Simon Clarke (cyclist) (born 1986), Australian road and former track cyclist
- Simon Clarke (rugby union) (1938–2017), English rugby union player
- Simon Clarke of the Clarke baronets
- Simon Clarke (sociologist) (1946–2022), English sociologist
- Sir Simon Haughton Clarke, 9th Baronet (1764–1832), West Indies merchant

== See also ==
- Simon Toulson-Clarke, lead singer and founder member of the pop group Red Box
- Simon Clark (disambiguation)
- Clarke (surname)
