= Zephra =

American opera pastiche

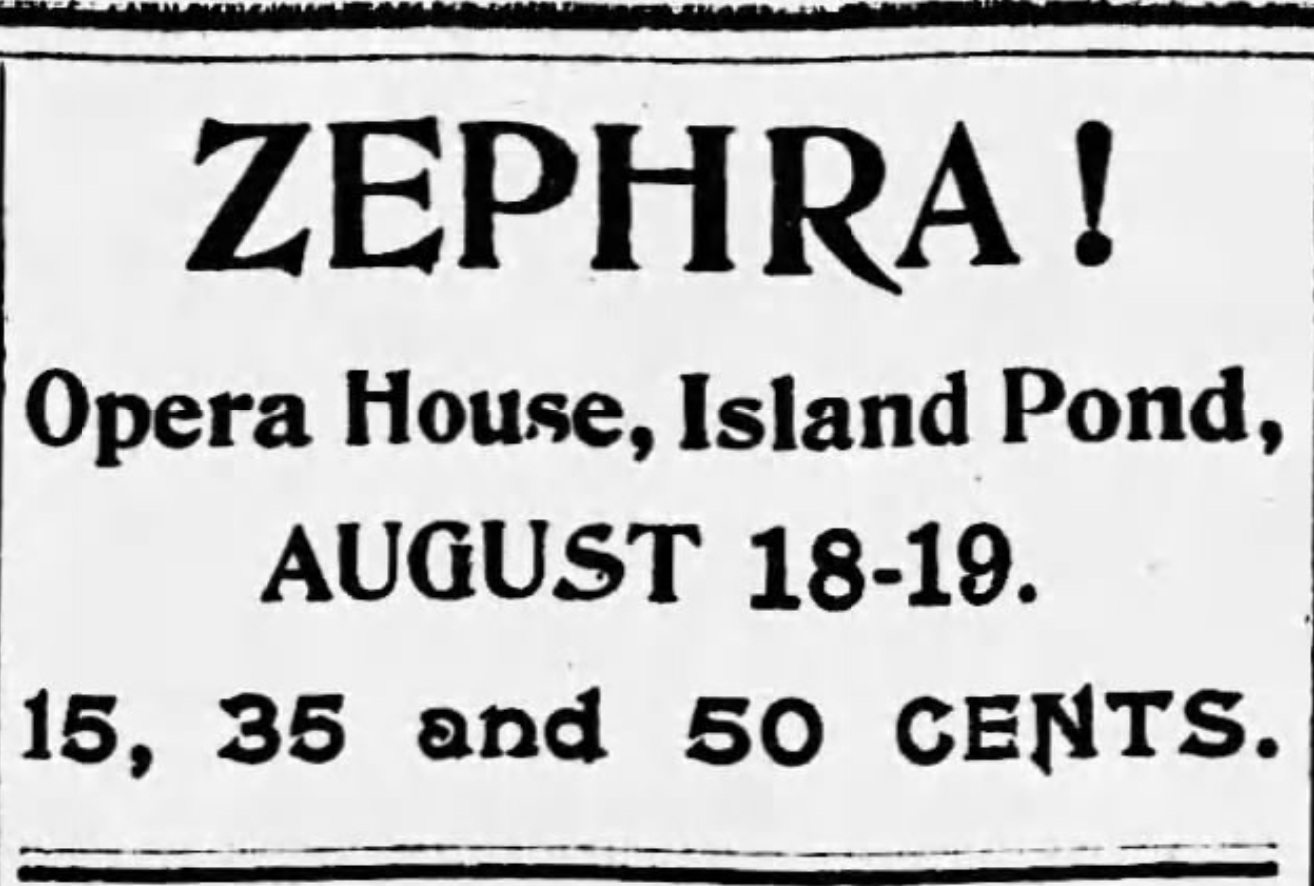
Advertisement for Zephra, in the Essex County Herald, Island Pond, Vermont, August 5, 1898

Zephra (also known as Queen Zephra or Zephra, the Fairy Queen) is a late-19th-century American amateur comic-fantasy pastiche combining opera, musical spectacle, and ballet. Written and directed by R. W. Averill, it achieved widespread popularity in regional theaters between the 1890s and early 1910s, where it was performed for civic and charitable causes. The work was notable for its elaborate scenic effects, casts sometimes exceeding 200 people drawn from local talent, and music that mixed operatic and popular idioms of the period. Written for amateur performance, Zephra drew large audiences and strong reviews for its elaborate staging, large ensembles, and tuneful, accessible score. However, the opera ceased to be performed after the 1910s, and the script and music are now lost.

== Synopsis ==
The story, with variations but largely consistent across productions, blends mythic and fairy-tale motifs. King Decius, the Storm King of Norseland, discovers a beautiful orphan girl in a witch's hut, whom he adopts and names Neyera, decreeing she will inherit his crown. Decius and Prince Juna of Mythland, with whom Decius has had a feud for years, are both subjects of Queen Zephra, ruler of the realm of Myth. Juna makes several attempts to reconcile with Decius but is rebuffed. Juna then disguises himself and enters Decius's castle, where he meets Neyera and they fall in love.

Later, at Queen Zephra's annual festival, Juna seeks Neyera's hand. Decius is enraged and banishes the princess to the Ice Caves of Norseland. Aided by Neyera's fairy godmother Unis and Queen Zephra herself, Juna rescues her, exposes Decius's treachery, and restores harmony between mortals and fairies. The opera concludes with a grand and ornate transformation scene in "the home of the fairy queen".

== Background and production ==
First advertised as Zephra, the Fairy Queen in the early 1890s, the opera was staged in towns across the American Midwest, including Danville, Kentucky, Streator, Illinois, Lafayette, Indiana, Lexington, Kentucky, and Galesburg, Illinois. Early reviewers described it as one of the most beautiful and elaborate entertainments ever presented locally, praising its "sparkling music", "gorgeous costumes", and "unique drills". These productions drew large audiences, filling opera houses "from pit to dome". The earliest reported production, in Danville, Kentucky, was reported to be underway in May 1891. Among the performers who appeared in early productions was opera singer Hilda Clark, who made her stage debut in an October 1892 production of the work at the Leavenworth Opera House, as Unis.

By the late 1890s, Zephra had become a recurring favorite of community opera companies, particularly in Pittsfield, Massachusetts, where it was revived in 1898 and 1899 under the direction of R. Averill, who also wrote the libretto. Averill emphasized "action" and continuous liveliness, training large amateur casts in intricate dances and marches. Productions typically featured well over one hundred performers, elaborate lighting effects, and dazzling finales depicting the realm of the fairy queen.

In 1901, Zephra was staged in Halifax, Nova Scotia, in a version described as "the biggest spectacular and musical production ever seen in the old city of Halifax". That staging, performed by a cast of 228 amateurs to benefit the Halifax School for the Blind, featured 33 musical numbers, 12 dances, and 39 scenic drops. The show continued to circulate for another decade, with a notable revival in Grand Forks, North Dakota, in 1911 under the title Queen Zephra.

The story as a whole alternates between the mortal realm and the fairy court, culminating in a spectacular transformation scene depicting "the home of the fairy queen". Musical highlights included solos such as "Tell Me, Cupid, What Is Love", as well as ensemble dances, "The Tarentella", "The Tennis Dance", "Dance of the Nymphs", and "Grand March of the Royal Guards". Contemporary reports describe Zephra as containing more than thirty musical numbers and at least a dozen choreographed dances, often arranged into extended divertissements within each act.

== Reception ==
Early reviews in Illinois newspapers hailed Zephra as "one of the most beautiful productions ever given", with music "far ahead of any professional production given here this year". Later performances in Massachusetts were said to "fill the Academy of Music from pit to dome" and to offer "clean, wholesome and modern" entertainment appealing to all ages. The Halifax Herald judged it superior in spectacle to any professional production ever staged in the city, citing its "magnificent spectacular effects and tuneful melodies". A 1911 Grand Forks Herald review likewise predicted success for its "interesting plot" and "series of musical numbers and clever dances".

Despite this popularity, the opera is now lost, as no known copy of the book or score is known to exist, the only modern remnant being an "Illustrated Souvenir of the Musical Spectacle, Zephra".
