= Kate Clark =

Kate Clark may refer to:

- Kate Clark (archaeologist), museum director and archaeologist
- Kate Clark (artist), Seattle-based artist
- Kate Clark (sculptor) New York-based sculptor
- Kate Clark (journalist), British journalist
- Kate Clark (writer) (1847–1926), New Zealand children's writer, poet, artist and community worker
- Kate Freeman Clark (1875–1957), American painter
- Kate Upson Clark (1851–1935), American writer
- Kiti Karaka Rīwai (1870–1927), New Zealand tribal leader
