= Simon Clark =

Simon Clark may refer to:

- Simon Clark (novelist) (born 1958), English horror novel writer
- Simon Clark (broadcaster) (born 1960), British television sports presenter and correspondent
- Simon Clark (Australian footballer) (born 1967), Australian rules footballer for Richmond
- Simon Clark (English footballer) (born 1967), English former professional footballer and manager
- Andy Clark (musician) (Simon Andrew Clark), English keyboard and synthesizer player
- Simon Clark (Thunder biker) (born 1967)

== See also ==
- Simon Clarke (disambiguation)
- Clark (surname)
