= Colin Clark =

Colin Clark may refer to:

- Colin Clark (economist) (1905–1989), British and Australian economist and statistician
- Colin Clark (filmmaker) (1932–2002), British writer and filmmaker
- Colin Clark (politician) (born 1969), British politician
- Colin Clark (soccer) (1984–2019), American soccer player
- Colin W. Clark (1931–2024), Canadian mathematician and behavioural ecologist
- Colin Clark of the Clark baronets
- Colin Clark (golfer) in NCAA Division III Men's Golf Championships
- "Colin Clark", the name under which Kryptonian orphan Kal-El (a.k.a. Superman) is raised in the alternate universe of Superman: True Brit

== See also ==
- Colin Clarke (disambiguation)
