= Andrew Clarke =

Andrew Clarke may refer to:

- Andrew Clarke (British Army officer, born 1793) (1793–1847), governor of Western Australia
- Sir Andrew Clarke (British Army officer, born 1824) (1824–1902), governor of the Straits Settlements, son of the above
- Andrew Clarke (actor) (born 1954), Australian actor
- Andrew Clarke (British politician) (1868–1940), Labour member of parliament 1923–1924, and 1929
- Andrew Clarke (cricketer, born 1961), English former cricketer
- Andrew Clarke (cricketer, born 1975), English cricketer
- Andrew Clarke (Trinidadian cricketer) (born 1945), Trinidadian cricketer
- Andy Clarke (footballer) (born 1967), English former footballer
- Andy Clarke (businessman) (born 1964), British businessman
- Andy Clarke (comics), British comics artist
- Andy C (Andrew Clarke, born 1973), English DJ
- Andrew Clarke, a fictional character from The Breakfast Club
- Andrew Clarke (composer), Australian composer who collaborates with artist Jess Johnson

== See also ==
- Andrew Clark (disambiguation)
