= Judge Clark =

Judge Clark may refer to:

- Bennett Champ Clark (1890–1954), judge of the District of Columbia Circuit
- Charles Clark (judge) (1925–2011), judge of the United States Court of Appeals for the Fifth Circuit
- Charles Dickens Clark (1847–1908), judge of the United States District Courts for the Eastern and Middle Districts of Tennessee
- Charles Edward Clark (1889–1963), judge of the United States Court of Appeals for the Second Circuit
- Chase A. Clark (1883–1966), judge of the United States District Court for the District of Idaho
- Daniel Clark (New Hampshire politician) (1809–1891), judge of the United States District Court for the District of New Hampshire
- Ron Clark (judge) (born 1953), judge of the United States District Court for the Eastern District of Texas
- Russell Gentry Clark (1925–2003), judge of the United States District Court for the Western District of Missouri
- Stephen R. Clark (born 1966), judge of the United States District Court for the Eastern District of Missouri
- Thomas Alonzo Clark (1920–2005), judge of the United States Courts of Appeals for the Fifth and Eleventh Circuits
- William Clark (judge) (1891–1957), judge of the United States Court of Appeals for the Third Circuit

== See also ==
- Judge Clarke
- Justice Clark (disambiguation)
- Justice Clarke (disambiguation)
