= Kenneth Clark (disambiguation) =

Kenneth Clark (1903–1983) was an English art historian and television presenter.

Kenneth, Ken(ny) Clark or Kenneth Clarke may also refer to:

== Sports ==
=== Gridiron football ===
- Kenny Clark (wide receiver) (1978–2025), American football wide receiver
- Kenny Clark (defensive tackle) (born 1995), American football defensive tackle
- Ken Clark (punter) (1948–2021), Canadian football punter in Canada and the United States
- Ken Clark (running back) (1966–2013), American football running back
- Ken Clarke (American football) (born 1956), American football defensive tackle

=== Other sports ===
- Kenny Clark (referee) (born 1961), former Scottish association football referee
- Ken Clark (weightlifter) (born 1955), American Olympic weightlifter
- Ken Clarke (Australian footballer) (1883–1965), Australian rules footballer
- Kenneth Clarke (field hockey) (1931–2014), Australian hockey player

== Others ==
- Kenneth Clarke, Baron Clarke of Nottingham (born 1940), British politician
- Kenneth Clark (psychologist) (1914–2005), African-American psychologist
- Kenneth Clark (ceramicist) (1922–2012), New Zealand-born British ceramicist
- Kenneth Clark (priest) (1922–2013), archdeacon of Swindon
- Ken Clark (actor) (1927–2009), American actor
- Ken Clark (politician), American politician
- Kenneth Willis Clark (1898–1979), Greek palaeographer
- Ken Clarke (bishop) (born 1949), Irish Anglican bishop
- Kenny Clarke (1914–1985), American jazz drummer
- Kenneth A. Clarke, president and CEO of Pritzker Military Museum and Library in Chicago

== See also ==
- Clarke (surname)
