= Terry Clarke =

Terry Clarke may refer to:

- Terry Clarke (drummer) (born 1944), Canadian jazz drummer
- Terry Clarke (Ontario politician), Canadian former mayor of Huntsville, Ontario

== See also ==
- Terri Clark (born 1968), Canadian country musician
- Terry Clark (disambiguation)
- Terence Clarke (disambiguation)
