= Terry Clark =

Terry Clark may refer to:

- Terry Clark (RAF officer) (1919–2020), British Royal Air Force veteran of the Battle of Britain
- Terry Clark (drug smuggler) (1944–1983), New Zealand-born drug smuggler and convicted murderer
- Terry Clark (musician) (born 1946), American Christian music singer-songwriter
- Terry D. Clark (1956–2001), American convicted murderer
- Terry Clark (baseball) (born 1960), American baseball player

== See also ==
- Terri Clark (born 1968), Canadian country music singer
- Terry Clarke (disambiguation)
- Sir Terence Clark (born 1934), British diplomat
- Terence Clarke (disambiguation)
- Terry Clark Hughes Jr. (died 2024), American criminal and gunman killed in the 2024 Charlotte shootout
