= Anne Clarke =

Ann or Anne Clarke may refer to:

- Ann Clarke (artist) (born 1944), Canadian artist
- Ann Clarke (immunologist), co-founder in 2004 of the Frozen Ark project
- Anne Clarke (theatre producer) (born 1961), Irish theatre producer
- Anne Clarke (theatre manager) (1806–?), Australian stage actor, singer and theatre manager
- Nancy Clarke (entrepreneur) (died 1811/12), also Ann, Barbadian hotelier and free woman of colour
- Anne Clarke (archaeologist), Australian archaeologist
- Ann M. Clarke (1928–2015), developmental psychologist
- Anne Clarke (politician), American-born British politician from London

== See also ==
- Anne Clark (disambiguation)
- Anna Clarke (1919–2004), British author of mystery novels
- Anna Mac Clarke (1919–1944), Women's Army Corps officer
- Anna Maria Catherine Clarke (c. 1789–1817), British heiress
