= Paul Clark =

Paul Clark may refer to:

- Paul F. Clark (1861–1932), Nebraska politician
- Paul Franklin Clark (1882–1983), American microbiologist
- Paul Leaman Clark (fl. 1942), World War 2 beachmaster
  - USCGC Paul Clark, cutter
- Paul Clark (Kentucky politician) (1932–2016), member of the Kentucky House of Representatives
- Paul Clark (presenter) (born 1953), Northern Ireland television presenter and journalist
- Paul Clark (designer) (born 1940), British designer and model maker
- Paul Clark (judge) (1940–2008), British circuit judge
- Paul Clark (poker player) (1947–2015), American poker player
- Paul Clark (Christian musician) (fl. 1972–2016), American musician
- Paul Clark (educator) (born 1954), American writer and professor of labor studies
- Paul Clark (athlete) (born 1957 or 1958), Canadian Paralympic athlete
- Paul Clark (British politician) (born 1957), British member of parliament
- Paul Clark (footballer) (born 1958), English footballer
- Paul Clark (keyboardist) (born 1962), English musician with the Bolshoi
- Paul Clark (composer) (born 1968), British composer

== See also ==
- Paul Clarke (disambiguation)
