= David Clarke =

David or Dave Clarke may refer to:

== Entertainment ==
- David Clarke (actor) (1908–2004), American actor
- Dave Clarke (musician) (born 1948), American singer, guitarist, and keyboard player
- Dave Clarke (DJ) (born 1968), English techno DJ
- David Clarke, a character in the TV series Revenge

== Politics ==
- David Clarke (Australian politician) (born 1947), member of New South Wales Legislative Council
- David Clarke (sheriff) (born 1956), former sheriff of Milwaukee County
- David A. Clarke (1943–1997), founding member of the Washington, D.C. city council

== Sports ==
=== Football ===
- Dave Clarke (English footballer) (born 1949), English football goalkeeper
- Dave Clarke (Scottish footballer) (born 1950), Scottish football player and manager
- Dave Clarke (Canadian football) (born 1950), Canadian football player
- David Clarke Sr. (born 1952), Australian rules footballer
- David Clarke (footballer, born 1964), English footballer
- David Clarke (Paralympic footballer) (born 1970), English five-a-side footballer
- David Clarke (Australian footballer, born 1980), Australian rules footballer
- David Clarke (Gaelic footballer) (born 1983), Gaelic footballer

=== Other sports ===
- David Clarke (English cricketer) (born 1967), English cricketer
- David Clarke (Australian cricketer) (born 1970), Australian cricketer
- Dave Clarke (hurler) (born 1971), Irish hurler
- David Clarke (ice hockey) (born 1981), English ice hockey player
- Dave Clarke (runner) (born 1958), British distance runner

== Academia ==
- David Clarke (journalist) (born 1967), English lecturer and writer on UFO sightings since 2008
- David Clarke (professor), deputy vice-chancellor of Bristol University
- David L. Clarke (1937–1976), English archaeologist
- David R. Clarke, material scientist and physics professor
- David J. Clarke (born 1954), professor of modern and contemporary art at the University of Hong Kong

== Religion ==
- David Clarke (minister) (born 1946), moderator of the Presbyterian Church in Ireland 2006
- David Clarke (priest) (1923–?), Anglican priest

== Business ==
- David S. Clarke (1942–2011), Australian chief executive and winemaker

== See also ==
- David Clark (disambiguation)
