= Paul Clarke =

Paul Clarke may refer to:

- Paul Clarke (Irish footballer) (born 1966), Gaelic football player for Dublin
- Paul Clarke (Scottish footballer) (born 1956), association football player for Kilmarnock
- Paul Clarke (Australian footballer) (1909–1969), Australian rules footballer
- Paul Clarke (rugby league), Australian rugby league player
- Paul Clarke (Big Brother), housemate in the second series of Big Brother in the UK
- Paul Clarke (character), from the Henderson's Boys series of young adult spy novels
- Paul Robert Virgo Clarke, Clerk of the Council of the Duchy of Lancaster

== See also ==
- Paul Clark (disambiguation)
