= Felicia Buttz Clark =

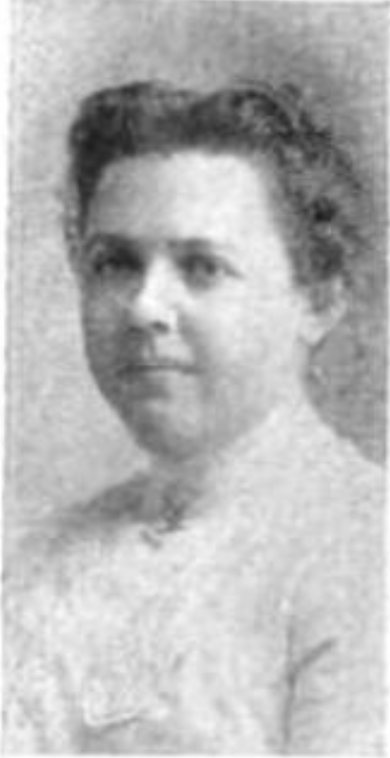
- Clark in 1906
- Born: Felicia Buttz; July 8, 1862 New York City
- Died: February 23, 1931 (aged 68) Pasadena, California, U.S.
- Occupation: writer
- Genre: novels; short stories; non-fiction
- Spouse: Nathaniel Walling Clark (m. 1883)

Felicia Buttz Clark (1862–1931) was an American writer of novels, short stories, and articles. For much of her life, she lived in Europe. Clark was affiliated with the Woman's Foreign Missionary Society of the Methodist Episcopal Church.

== Early life and education ==
Felicia Buttz was born in New York City, July 8, 1862. (Note: Clark's obituary in the Pasadena Star-News states that she was born July 6, 1862.) Her parents were Henry Anson Buttz and Emily (Hoagland) Buttz. Her father served as president of the Drew Theological Seminary.

Clark was educated in private schools in Madison, New Jersey and Morristown, New Jersey.

== Career ==
Beppino, 1901

Der Jesuit, 1911

Gigi, the hero of Sicily, 1907

Schwester Anna, 1898

In 1883, she married Nathaniel Walling Clark (1859–1918), of Plattsburg, New York. Traveling widely, they left the U.S. for Germany on April 23, 1889, with Rev. Clark serving as professor at the Martin Mission Theological Institute in Frankfurt until 1893, when he was transferred to Italy. There, he served as President of the Methodist Episcopal Theological School in Rome. They lived in Rome for 20 years, and another three years elsewhere in Europe. In 1903, Dr. and Mrs. Clark traveled in Greece and Asia Minor, Dr. Clark serving as traveling secretary of the World's Christian Student Federation. With her long residence abroad, her knowledge of modern languages, and her broad culture in art and literature, Clark was selected as the national organizer and hostess for the 1926 Methodist Fellowship Tour in Europe.

Affiliated with the Woman's Foreign Missionary Society of the Methodist Episcopal Church (MEC), Clark served as editor of its Junior Missionary magazine.

She was the author of The Cripple of Nuremberg, 1900; The Sword of Garibaldi, 1905; The Jesuit, 1908; The Treasure of Reifenstein, 1913; The City of Mystery, 1914; Laughing Water, 1915; and Virgilia, 1917. She wrote serials and her short stories were published in secular and religious periodicals in the U.S. and England. Many of her works were translated into foreign languages such as Danish, German, Italian, and Swedish.

Clark served as chair, International YWCA in Rome.

== Personal life ==
In religion, she was a member of the MEC.

Returning to the U.S. in 1915, Clark lived in Madison, New Jersey. She made her winter home in Pasadena, California, where she died February 23, 1931.

== Selected works ==
=== Books ===
- Beppino, 1901
- The City of Mystery, 1914
- The Cripple of Nuremberg, 1900
- Gigi, the hero of Sicily, 1907
- The Jesuit, a Story, 1908
- Laughing Water, 1915
- The Sword of Garibaldi, 1905
- The Treasure of Reifenstein, 1913
- Schwester Anna, 1898
- Virgilia, 1917

The silver lamp, 1924

=== Articles ===
- "A bit of Paris", The Epworth Herald, 1897
- "An Interesting Race", The Indian Leader, 1924 (text)
- "Bernini: The modern Michael Angelo", Chautauquan, 1902
- "Carnival in Rome", Western Christian Advocate, 1897 (text)
- "The Heights", North-western Christian Advocate, 1921
- "The Immortal Soul", North-western Christian Advocate, 1921
- "Keats and His Philosophy of Life", Methodist Review, 1915
- "The Love of Life", North-western Christian Advocate, 1921
- "Music in Italy", The Epworth Herald, 1898
- "News of Rome", 1910 (text)
- "The Printing Press in Rome", Philadelphia Methodist, 1906
- "The Royal Family of Italy", St. Nicholas, 1905
- "The wisdom of a Humorist", North-western Christian Advocate, 1921

=== Short stories ===
- "Aunt Sally Primmer", The Epworth Era, 1920 (text)
- "The Christmas Lily", World Outlook, 1915
- "In Memory of St. Valentine", The Epworth Herald, 1898
- "Lisette of Alsace", Everyland, 1918
- "Streams and Stars", North-western Christian Advocate, 1921
- "Under the Flag", Everyland, 1916
- "The Way of the Cross", North-western Christian Advocate, 1921
- "Zaira, Home Journal, 1896 (text)

=== Leaflets ===
- "White Strings and Angels"
