= Max Clark =

Max Clark may refer to:

- Max Clark (rugby union)
- Max Clark (footballer)
- Max Clark (baseball)
