= Andrew Clark =

Andrew Clark may refer to:

== Sportsmen ==
- Andy Clark (footballer) (1879–1940), Scottish football/soccer player
- Andrew Clark (soccer) (born 1974), Australian football/soccer player
- Andrew Clark (ice hockey) (born 1988), Canadian ice hockey player

== Others ==
- Sir Andrew Clark, 1st Baronet (1826–1893), British physician
- Sir Andrew Clark, 3rd Baronet (1898–1979), British barrister
- Andrew Clark (priest) (1856–1922), Scottish Anglican clergyman and diarist
- Andrew G. Clark (born 1954), American population geneticist
- Andrew Inglis Clark (1848–1907), Australian politician
- Andy Clark (philosopher) (born 1957), British philosopher
- Andy Clark (musician), English musical artist
- Andy Clark, English musical artist with the band Upp

== See also ==
- Andrew Clarke (disambiguation)
