= Marcia Clark (artist) =

American painter

Marcia Clark (born 1938 in Bay Shore, New York) is a figurative painter of al fresco landscapes with a focus on icebergs and glaciers as they change over time on repeated visits north. She is known for her experimental paintings using portable gessoed aluminum, Denril and sheets of frosted Mylar pieced together and extending irregularly in many directions, capturing panoramic expanses in these climes.

== Early life ==
Clark studied at Antioch College and then the Art Institute of Chicago before receiving a BFA from Yale University in 1962. Her professors at Yale included Josef Albers, the director of the program, as well as figurative painters Neil Welliver, Bernard Chaet and Alex Katz. She also studied at the Ecole des Beaux Arts, Paris. She received her MFA from SUNY New Paltz in 1974. Her spiritual mentor was the Hudson River School painter of the 19th century, Thomas Cole, whose work Clark said, asked her "Are you looking? Well, look deeper."

An important early experience was the exploration of the White Mountains in New Hampshire which she started climbing in the late 1960s. Clark was selected by the Naturalist in Residency Program of the Appalachian Mountain Club, to paint at the Lakes of the Clouds Hut, close to the summit of Mt. Washington. It was the beginning of her awareness of change and flux in an environment. The artist and environmentalist Alan Gussow brought a film crew to the top of Mt. Washington to interview Clark for "A Sense of Place" for Nebraska ETV in 1974.

== Painting ==
Shortly after her White Mountains expedition, Clark returned to New York and joined the First Street Gallery in the city's art scene in 1970s SoHo. She was a guest resident of Telerate News Agency and NBC on the World Trade Center's 104th Floor for some months and a 28th floor studio of her own in NYC where Clark was experimenting with extreme viewpoints that had begun in the White Mountains. The style can be seen as somewhat abstract but the forms' solidity with strong light establish the urban and rural reality. Clark has said her paintings are not literal recordings of facts, but are responses to what she sees. To bring together the shifting visions we all have before vast space, Clark abandons the single viewpoint.

Clark joined the Blue Mountain Gallery in New York in 1985 and became its director in 1993. Continuing her exploration of mountain landscapes, she traveled in the 1990s to Tibet, Nepal and the Himalayas. Over many subsequent art travels and residencies since the 1990s, which included Iceland, Greenland and Alaska, perhaps her most adventurous was a solitary stay in a cabin on a rock imbedded in the ice of Ruth Glacier on the slope Mt Denali. Clark draws on location and makes oil and watercolor sketches, keeping a photo journal to help recall. The smaller works are done on site and the larger paintings are done in the studio.

"I'm drawn in by the drama of the changing panorama. There is a sense of foreboding in those seemingly solid structures that melt and vanish or turn and disappear and I want to bear witness to their existence." Clark's anxiety about climate change keeps her returning to the north, but the work is not directly political. In recent years, Greenland has been her focus in many trips and she has become particularly close to the community of Uummannaq where she has chronicled the evolving scene. The director of the children's home there commissioned her to paint a landscape on the side of a 20 by 8 ft (6.1 by 2.4 m) shipping container they had for storage with the subject of their own heart-shaped mountain depicted on it. It was completed in 2015.

== Professional life ==
In New York, Clark has exhibited in the American Academy of Arts and Letters, Museum of the City of New York, American Museum of Natural History, Albany Institute of History and Art, and the Hudson River Museum where she also guest curated a traveling exhibition of contemporary panoramas. Her work is in the collections of the Anglo-American Museum and Louisiana State Museum in Baton Rouge, LA, in Greenland at the Ilulissat Kunst Museum, and the Upernavik Museum, as well as in the Museum of the City of New York and the Albany Institute of History and Art. Clark has been a recipient of the Childe Hassam Award, a National Endowment of the Arts Artist in Residence grant and has written for Smithsonian Magazine, retracing travels of Thomas Cole. Clark taught drawing and color theory for many years at Parsons School of Design in New York City.
