= Sally Clark (disambiguation) =

Sally Clark (1964–2007) was an English victim of a miscarriage of justice who was falsely convicted and imprisoned for the murder of her two infant sons.

Sally Clark may also refer to:

- Petula Clark (born 1932), British singer, actress, and songwriter
- Sally Clark (equestrian) (born 1958), New Zealand equestrian
- Sally Clark (playwright) (born 1953), Canadian playwright and filmmaker
- Sally J. Clark, Seattle City Council member
