= Bud Clark =

Bud Clark may refer to:

- William Clark (skier) (1910–1975), Canadian skier, also known as Bud Clark
- Bud Clark (politician) (1931–2022), American politician and 48th mayor of Portland, Oregon
- Bud Clark (American football) (born 2002), American football player for the Seattle Seahawks

== See also ==
- Buddy Clark (1912–1949), American singer of the Big Band era
