= David Clark (footballer, born 1878) =

English footballer

Personal information
- Full name: David Cleland Clark
- Date of birth: 21 May 1878
- Place of birth: Sligo, Ireland
- Position: Goalkeeper

Senior career*
Years	Team	Apps	(Gls)
1900–1902	Northampton Town		
1902–1904	Glossop	67	(0)
1904–1906	Bristol Rovers		
1906–1909	West Ham United	17	(0)
1909–1910	Bradford Park Avenue	7	(0)
1910–1911	Southend United		
1911	Bristol Rovers		
Total		91	(0)
- * Club domestic league appearances and goals

David Cleland Clark (21 May 1878–unknown) was an Irish footballer who played in the Football League for Bradford Park Avenue and Glossop and in the Southern League for Bristol Rovers, Northampton Town, Southend United and West Ham United.
