= David Delano Clark =

American nuclear physicist

- Born: February 10, 1924; Austin, Texas, U.S.
- Died: December 22, 1997 (aged 73)
- Education: University of Texas
- Occupation: Nuclear physicist

David Delano Clark (February 10, 1924 – December 22, 1997) was a nuclear physicist best known for his work at Cornell University building nuclear reactors and using them to perform neutron activation analysis.

== Biography ==
Born in Austin, Texas. He studied at the University of Texas and received his Bachelor of Arts at the University of California, Berkeley in 1948. He earned a Ph.D. in physics at the University of California, Berkeley in 1953. Dr. Clark worked at the Brookhaven National Laboratory in Upton, New York prior to joining Cornell in 1955. In 1961, Clark became the first director of Cornell's Ward Laboratory of Nuclear Engineering. There, he designed and built a 100-kilowatt nuclear reactor unit, the first of its class. In 1978, Clark became the head of Cornell's nuclear science and engineering department, a position he held, along with the directorship, until his retirement in 1996. He remained a professor emeritus until his death.

In 1968 he was awarded a Guggenheim Fellowship. In 1996, Clark was named an American Nuclear Society fellow, the highest honor bestowed on an individual by the society. Clark died of cardiac arrhythmia at his office at Cornell on December 22, 1997. Each year, in his honor, the Cornell School of Applied Engineering and Physics hands out the David Delano Clark award for the best Master of Engineering, or M.Eng., project.
