= Laura I. Clarke =

American nanoscientist

Laura I. Clarke is an American polymer scientist and nanoscientist known for her research on nanomotors, on the observation of kinetic and electric properties of nanostructures, and on the fabrication of nanofibers and nanocomposites including electrospinning. She is Alumni Distinguished Undergraduate Professor of Physics at North Carolina State University.

== Education and career ==
Clarke studied physics as an undergraduate at Montana State University, graduating in 1992. She completed a Ph.D. in physics in 1998 at the University of Oregon; her dissertation was Coulomb Blockade Dominated Transport in Gold Nanoparticle Systems.

After postdoctoral research at Dartmouth College and the University of Colorado, she joined the North Carolina State University faculty in 2003. She added an affiliation with the Department of Biomedical Engineering in 2008, was promoted to associate professor in 2009, and became a full professor in 2015. She was named as Alumni Distinguished Undergraduate Professor of Physics in 2018.

== Recognition ==
Clark received the 2022 UNC Board of Governors Award for Excellence in Teaching. She was the 2023 recipient of the Jonathan F. Reichert and Barbara Wolff-Reichert Award for Excellence in Advanced Laboratory Instruction of the American Physical Society (APS), citing her "leadership and dedicated efforts in developing sustainable laboratory experiences and courses throughout the entire physics curriculum that address the needs of diverse students who are considering careers in both industry and graduate study".

She was named a Fellow of the American Physical Society in 2023, after a nomination from the APS Division of Soft Matter, "for work on polymers spanning from nanometer to mesoscopic scales, including under optical and electric driving; and for teaching, scholarship, and innovation benefiting diverse students underserved by standard practices".
