= Lee Clark =

Lee Clark may refer to:

- Lee Clark (footballer) (born 1972), former English footballer and manager
- Lee Clark (politician) (1936–2008), Canadian Member of Parliament from Manitoba
- Lee Anna Clark, professor in the department of psychology at the University of Iowa
- Lee Clark (The Amazing Spiez!), a character on the animation series The Amazing Spiez!
- Lee Clark, television presenter, ex-husband of Pollyanna Woodward

== See also ==
- Lee Clarke (born 1983), English footballer for St. Alban's City
