= Anna Clark (British historian) =

British historian

Anna Clark (born 1974) is an ancient historian and tutor at Christ Church, Oxford.

Clark read ancient history at the University of St Andrews, where she completed her master's, before gaining her doctorate at Merton College, Oxford.

She is currently a Tutor in Roman History at Christ Church, Oxford. Clark's research interests have focused around Roman politics and religion. Her first book Divine Qualities: Cult and Community in Republican Rome, published in 2007, has been called "one of the best attempts to date to make sense of Roman religion" and an "invaluable book, which puts the study of an important aspect of Roman religion on a new footing".
