= Eugene Clark =

Eugene Clark or Gene Clark may refer to:

- Eugene Clark (politician) (1850–1932), Wisconsin politician
- Eugene Clark (rower) (1906–1981), American Olympic rower
- Eugene Clark (actor) (born 1951), American actor and professional football player
- Eugene F. Clark (c. 1911–1998), United States Navy officer
- Eugene V. Clark (1926–2012), Catholic priest
- Gene Clark (1944–1991), American singer-songwriter
- Torchy Clark (Eugene Clark, 1929–2009), first basketball coach at the University of Central Florida
- Eugene B. Clark (1874–1942), founder of Clark Equipment Company
- Gene Clark, 1968 California political candidate
- Gene Clark, grandson of Chief Geronimo, see Buffalo Ranch
- "Gene Clark", a song by Teenage Fanclub from their 1993 album Thirteen

== See also ==
- Eugenie Clark (1922–2015), American ichthyologist sometimes called "The Shark Lady"
