= Jeanne Clark =

American internist and physician-scientist

- Born: Jeanne Marie Clark
- Education: Robert Wood Johnson Medical School; Johns Hopkins Bloomberg School of Public Health
- Scientific career
- Fields: Internal medicine, epidemiology, obesity
- Workplaces: Johns Hopkins School of Medicine

Jeanne Marie Clark is an American internist and physician-scientist specializing in the epidemiology and treatment of obesity, type 2 diabetes and metabolic dysfunction–associated steatotic liver disease. She is a Professor of Medicine at the Johns Hopkins School of Medicine.

== Life ==
Clark earned an M.D. at the Robert Wood Johnson Medical School in 1992. She conducted a residency in internal medicine at the Dartmouth–Hitchcock Medical Center in 1996. Clark conducted fellowships at the Johns Hopkins School of Medicine in 1998 and 2000. She earned an M.P.H. at the Johns Hopkins Bloomberg School of Public Health.

Clark is a Professor of Medicine and Director of the Division of General Internal Medicine at the Johns Hopkins School of Medicine. She holds a joint appointment in Epidemiology in the Johns Hopkins Bloomberg School of Public Health. Clark is also the Executive Director of the Brancati Center for the Advancement of Community Care. She researches the epidemiology and treatment of obesity and related conditions including type 2 diabetes and metabolic dysfunction–associated steatotic liver disease. Clark is a registered provider with the Florida Department of Health and performs telehealth appointments for Florida patients.
