= Paul Clark (educator) =

American historian

Paul F. Clark (born August 18, 1954) is an American writer who is professor of labor studies at Pennsylvania State University. He is head of the Department of Labor Studies and Employment Relations (until July 1, 2006, the Labor Studies and Industrial Relations). He also holds a professorship in the Department of Health Policy and Administration.

== Childhood and education ==
Clark was born to Frederick and Bertha (Mahaney) Clark in 1954 in Millville, New Jersey. He received his bachelor's degree from Bucknell University in 1976. While working on his undergraduate degree, Clark worked for part of 1975 as a researcher for the United Mine Workers of America in Washington, D.C. He married Darlene Ann Gates in 1977. (Darlene Clark is a senior instructor in the Penn State School of Nursing.) They have two children, a son and daughter.

During the 1977-to-1978 academic year, Clark performed graduate studies at the University of Glasgow in Scotland. He returned to the United States, and in 1979 received his master of science degree in industrial and labor relations from Cornell University. Clark later received a Ph.D. in public administration from the University of Pittsburgh in 1986.

== Career ==
Clark was a labor extension associate at the Cornell University School of Industrial and Labor Relations in 1979. Later that same year, he was appointed an instructor in the Department of Labor Studies and Employment Relations at Penn State's New Kensington campus, a position he held until 1982. Clark was appointed an assistant professor at Penn State in 1982, and an associate professor in 1989. He also holds an appointment as a faculty associate at Penn State's Center for Work and Family Research and Penn State's Center for Health Care and Policy Research.

== Research interests ==
Clark's research focuses labor relations and union organizing in the health care industry, transnational labor relations issues in the healthcare industry, union structure and governance, union member commitment, and union democracy.

Clark also educates union leaders, staff, activists and workers about labor law, union administration and union democracy.

Clark has also consulted with the Mine Workers, United Steelworkers, National Association of Letter Carriers and the Pennsylvania AFL-CIO on labor history and research.

== Memberships and awards ==
Clark is a member of the United Association for Labor Education. He is also a member of the Labor and Employment Relations Association, and served as the organization's Western Pennsylvania chapter president from 1989 to 1990.

Since 1990, he has served on the editorial board of Labor Studies Journal.

Clark received a grant from the Pennsylvania Humanities Council in 1986, and a research grant from the National Endowment for the Humanities in 1990.

In 1993, Clark was named a research fellow at the George Meany Center for Labor Studies

Clark is also a member of the American Federation of Teachers (AFT), AFL-CIO.

== Published works ==
=== Solely authored books ===
- The Miners' Fight for Democracy: Arnold Miller and the Reform of the United Mine Workers. Ithaca, N.Y.: ILR Press, 1981. ISBN 0-87546-086-0
- Forging a Union of Steel. Ithaca, N.Y.: ILR Press, 1987. ISBN 0-87546-134-4
- Building More Effective Unions. Ithaca, N.Y.: ILR Press, 2000. ISBN 0-8014-8705-6

=== Co-edited books ===
- Delaney, John; Frost, Ann; and Clark, Paul F., eds. Collective Bargaining in the Private Sector: Current Developments and Future Challenges. Champaign, Ill.: Industrial Relations Research Association, 2003. ISBN 0-913447-84-6

=== Solely authored book chapters ===
- Clark, Paul F., "Health Care: A Growing Role for Collective Bargaining." In Collective Bargaining in the Private Sector: Current Developments and Future Challenges. John Delaney, Ann Frost and Paul F. Clark, eds. Champaign, Ill.: Industrial Relations Research Association, 2003. ISBN 0-913447-84-6

=== Co-authored articles ===
- Clark, Paul F. and Gray, Lois S. "Assessing the Proposed U.A.W., U.S.W., And I.A.M. Merger: Critical Issues and Potential Outcomes." Journal of Labor Research. 21:1 (Winter 2000).
- Clark, Paul F. and Masters, Marick. "Competing Interest Groups and Union Members' Voting." Social Science Quarterly. 82:1 (March 2001).
- Clark, Paul F.; Clark, Darlene A.; Day, David; and Shea, Dennis. "The Impact Of Health Care Reform On Nurses' Attitudes Toward Unions: The Role of Climate For Patient Care." Industrial and Labor Relations Review. 55:1 (October 2001).
- Clark, Paul F. and Clark, Darlene A. "Challenges Facing Nurses' Associations And Unions: A Global Perspective." International Labor Review. 142:1 (2003).
- Fullagar, Clive; Gallagher, Daniel G.; Clark, Paul F.; and Carroll, Anthony. "Union Commitment and Participation: A 10-Year Longitudinal Study." Journal of Applied Psychology. 89:4 (August 2004).
- Clark, Paul F. and Gray, Lois S. "Changing Administrative Practices in American Unions: A Research Note." Industrial Relations. 44:4 (October 2005).
- Clark, Paul F. and Clark, Darlene A. "Union Strategies for Improving Patient Care: The Key to Nurse Unionism." Labor Studies Journal. 31:1 (Spring 2006).
- Clark, Paul F.; Stewart, James B.; and Clark, Darlene A. "The Globalization of the Labor Market for Healthcare Professionals." International Labor Review. 145:1-2 (2006).
