= Gagosian =

Gagosian is a surname originating in Armenia. The name is derived from the word gagos and is linked historically to the region of Gag. It means "to be born" or "to give birth". Notable people with the surname include:

- Larry Gagosian (born 1945), American art dealer
  - Gagosian Gallery, an art gallery owned by Larry Gagosian
- Robert Gagosian (born 1944), American oceanographer
