= Libby Clark =

African-American journalist

Elizabeth "Libby" Clark
- Born: October 1917; Chester, Pennsylvania, U.S.
- Died: 23 January 2012 (aged 94–95); Inglewood, California, U.S.
- Education: Columbia University
- Occupations: Journalist, editor, public relations consultant
- Years active: 1951–2012
- Notable work: FEM magazine, The Plum Book, Black Family Reunion Cookbook
- Spouses: Samuel William (div. 1947); Walter Stanley (annulled 1956); Jim Allen (died 1970); John E. Fegan (annulled)
- Awards: National Newspaper Publishers Association Lifetime Achievement Award

Elizabeth "Libby" Clark (1917 or 1918 – January 23, 2012) was an African-American journalist whose accomplishments included founding a magazine in Los Angeles, working as a newspaper writer, and forming her own public relations firm.

== Early years ==
A native of Chester, Pennsylvania, Clark was one of at least six children born to Samuel W. Clark and Emily G. Smith.

Clark was a graduate of Columbia University.

== Career ==
In 1954, Clark launched FEM magazine, a publication that was directed toward women, with a focus on African Americans. Clark said then that besides being informative for readers, she wanted the publication to make potential advertisers aware of the multi-million-dollar purchasing potential of African American women.

Clark wrote for the Chester Times and worked in the West Coast bureau of the Pittsburgh Courier. She later wrote about food and social issues for the Los Angeles Sentinel for 50 years. Her column, "Food For Thought," which injected political awareness into food articles for a grass roots audience, was syndicated in 150 newspapers by Amalgamated Publishers, Inc. From 1989 to 1994, she published "The Plum Book," an annual ‘Who’s Who’ in the Los Angeles/Southern California black community, and distributed it freely to politicians and community leaders as a community resource. She also edited and co-wrote the Black Family Reunion Cookbook, which sold more than 250,000 copies and made best-seller lists in 1991. In 1951, the University of Southern California (USC) designated Clark as the journalist who would accompany a group of USC students on a two-month tour of Europe and report on the students' activities.

Clark also applied her journalistic skills to public relations when she became the first African-American with a business license to own a public relations firm, Libby Clark Associates, in California; she went on to operate the firm for 50 years. In 1969, Los Angeles County hired her as the public information officer for the then-new Martin Luther King Jr. Hospital.

One of her public relations associates was screenwriter, Lenny Bruce collaborator (Leather Jacket, Killer's Grave and The Degenerate), author, photographer, and photojournalist William Karl Thomas (born January 25, 1933 in Bay St. Louis, Mississippi), who, in 2011, published a novel titled “Cleo,” based on his ten-year professional association with Miss Libby Clark during the 1950s and 1960s. In it he describes her personal friendships with famous personalities Lena Horne, Dorothy Dandridge, James Baldwin, Tom Bradley, Leo Branton, and others. He also includes excerpts from her 1960 coverage of the Nigerian Independence in Africa with excerpts from her interviews with Golda Meir, Abubakar Tafawa Balewa, and Princess Alexandra from England. Thomas’ publisher's website includes a sampling of his photography with photos of Libby Clark.

== Recognition ==
When she was 85 years old, Clark received the National Newspaper Publishers Association’s Lifetime Achievement Award. In 1992, she was honored with a benefit dinner in recognition of her five decades of service to journalism. Funds raised at the event went to the McGarrity Memorial African-American Scholarship Fund, which helps African-American students. The evening included "proclamations from many of California's most prominent politicians praising her for years of service to the community."

== Personal life ==
Clark was married four times: in 1942 to Samuel William, a steel worker and pool hall owner in Chester, Pennsylvania, until they divorced in 1947; in 1955 to Walter Stanley, an aircraft worker and gas station owner in Los Angeles, whose marriage was annulled in 1956; in 1970 to Jim Allen, a major building contractor who had been a public relations client for 10 years and who died 8 months after their marriage of a brain injury sustained while inspecting a sub-division he was building; and on December 30, 1977 to John E. Fegan, who owned a chain of tuxedo rental stores, whose marriage was annulled after one year. During the decade from 1957 to 1967, she maintained a professional and personal relationship with the author, William Karl Thomas, who was fifteen years her junior.

== Death ==
Clark died of Alzheimer's disease in Inglewood, California, in 2012.
