= Laura Guido-Clark =

American designer

Laura Guido-Clark is an American designer of color, material and texture of consumer products. She has been dubbed an 'Experience Consultant' reflecting her interest and study of human reactions to the look and feel of new products. At NeoCon 2017 she launched a color methodology called Love Good Color. Her approach integrates scientific and aesthetic theories so that emotion and the senses can be considered by designers when using color.

Guido-Clark is a native of Dearborn, Michigan, United States. She attended Wayne State University, Detroit. As a child she was inspired by Green Eggs and Ham by Dr. Seuss and The Wizard of Oz leading her to choose design over medicine as her major.

She founded the non-profit Project Color Corps with the aim of "optical optimism" in urban neighborhood schools through paint and pattern.

In 2011, under a Fast Company heading called Masters of Design, she was asked to contribute to a panel piece on American Design. The panel included Roger Martin of The University of Toronto, Thomas Lockwood of The Design Management Institute and Mickey McManus of Maya Design amongst others.

In 2014, the IIDA Northern California Chapter awarded her with their Leadership Award of Excellence. Alongside Laurie Pressman of Pantone and Kat Holmes of Microsoft she was a member of the interview panel for the documentary 'Color in Sight'. The film explored the impact of color in the design and success of a product

== Portfolio ==
Guido-Clark has contributed to the design of products for Herman Miller, HP, Samsung and Toyota. She has designed textiles and patterns for HBF, Pallas, Carnegie, Ultrafabrics, FLOR and Uncommon.

She consults closely with Herman Miller as their Creative Director of Materials.

== Philanthropy ==
In 2011 Guido-Clark founded the non-profit Project Color Corps. The charity aims to inspire local, urban communities to feel and be more positive through the power of color and pattern on community buildings such as schools. The charity teaches children and community members about color and pattern enabling and inviting them to be co-designers of their space. Professional designers and contractors are then engaged to work alongside volunteers to implement the community vision.

Project Color Corps contributions to the community include the following:

- E.C. Reems Academy, Oakland CA
- Wo-Chieve Academy, Oakland CA
- Para Los Ninos School, Los Angeles CA
- Cambridge Elementary, Concord CA
- Willie Mays Boys and Girls Club, San Francisco CA

== Writing and interviews ==
As a guest blogger Guido-Clark has written a number of articles on color and design for Fast Company. In her Dreaming in Technicolor blog she writes about the impact of color on our everyday lives and the design process. Her blog list includes:

- Why Color is Not a Cure-All
- Focus Groups: It's Like Saying the F-Word to Creatives
- Envisioning a Brighter Future: A ColorCorps for American Cities

For over a decade she has been interviewed extensively on design, her role and her philosophy of color. In a 2005 SFGate interview she discussed her college years and her views on the emotional importance of color in our everyday lives.

The New York Times has covered Guido-Clark twice. In 2006 she considered the design of the bed in an article entitled The Bed, Remade. In 2009 she appeared in an article entitled Boundless Cheer covering her on a shopping trip to Manhattan.

Guido-Clark discussed some of her favourite fellow designers such as Magnus Anesund, Vibe Harsloef, and Tanya Aguiñiga in a Design Milk article in 2010.

In an interview given to Design Applause in 2011 she expanded on how she arrived at "Experience Consultant' to describe the work performed by her and her colleagues in Laura Guido-Clark Design. She also compared American and Japanese design processes and values.

In June 2017, she was interviewed by the magazine Interior Design The piece covered her design inspiration, her childhood in Michigan, her philosophy of color and her current work including Love Good Color - her new design methodology.

== Video ==
=== Presentations ===
- Design for Change
- CUSP 2011

=== Featured ===
- Color in Sight: A Documentary on the Details of Color in Design
- Laura Guido-Clark, Designer Profile
- The Imagineered Workspace
- The Entwined Collection
- The Aeron Chair
