= Kate Clark (sculptor) =

American sculptor

Kate Clark is a New York-based sculptor, residing and working in Brooklyn. Her work synthesizes human faces with the bodies of animals. Clark's preferred medium is animal hide. Mary Logan Barmeyer says Clark's work is "meant to make you think twice about what it means to be human, and furthermore, what it means to be animal." Writer Monica Ramirez-Montagut says Clark's works "reclaim storytelling and vintage techniques as strategies to address contemporary discourses on welfare, the environment, and female struggles."

== Education and early career ==
Kate Clark comes from a background in arts, with her father being a painter. Kate's art of choice was also painting; she did not get into sculpting until college. In 1994, Kate Clark graduated from Cornell University with a Bachelor of Fine Arts in Sculpture. She went on to obtain a Master of Fine Arts degree from Cranbrook Academy of Art in 2001. Kate began her work by creating a piece called How Are You?, which was featured in the Forum Gallery of the Cranbrook Art Museum in Bloomfield Hills, Michigan. This museum was first opened to the public in 1942. Kate had her first solo exhibit at Claire Oliver Gallery in New York in 2008. Since then, Kate has been included in museum exhibitions at the Aldrich Museum of Contemporary Art, The Islip Art Museum, and The Bellevue Arts Museum. Kate had her first solo museum show in 2010 at the Mobile Museum of Art.

== Critical reaction ==
Reviewing "Pretty Tough: Contemporary Storytelling" at The Aldrich Contemporary Art Museum, Ridgefield, CT, Benjamin Genocchio for The New York Times called her work "successful as works of visual theater", praising one work, Matriarch, as "particularly unsettling".

== Exhibitions ==
=== Solo exhibitions ===
2010

- Kate Clark: Give and Take, Mobile Museum of Art, Mobile, AL

2008

- Perfect Strangers, Claire Oliver Gallery, New York, NY

2007

- Kate Clark, Hudson D. Walker Gallery, Fine Arts Work Center, Provincetown, MA

=== Group exhibitions ===
2016

- Dead Animals and the Curious Occurrence of Taxidermy in Contemporary Art, David Winton Bell Gallery - Brown University, Providence, RI

2012

- Fairy Tales, Monsters, and the Genetic Imagination, First Center for the Visual Arts, Nashville, TN; Winnipeg Art Gallery, Winnipeg, Manitoba, Canada

Glenbow Museum, Calgary, Alberta, Canada

2011

- No Object is an Island: New Dialogues with the Cranbrook Collection, Cranbrook Art Museum, Bloomfield Hills, MI
- The Sum of Their Parts, Shore Institute of the Contemporary Arts, Asbury Park, NJ
- Cute & Creepy, Museum of Fine Arts, Florida State University, Tallahassee, FL
- In Rare Form, Ann Street Gallery, Newburgh, NY

2009

- Art Miami, Claire Oliver Gallery
- NEXT Chicago, Claire Oliver Gallery
- Uber-Portrait, Bellevue Arts Museum, Bellevue, WA
- Pretty Tough: Contemporary Storytelling, The Aldrich Contemporary Art Museum, Ridgefield, CT.

2008

- I Dream of Genomes, Islip Art Museum, East Islip, New York
- New, Next, Now, Claire Oliver Gallery, NY

2007

- Posing, Abrons Art Center, Henry Street Settlement, New York, NY
- Meta-Majesty, Chashama / Explosivo, New York, NY
- SCOPE Hamptons Art Fair, presented by Jack the Pelican Presents, Brooklyn, NY
- Our Dark Heroes, Secret Project Robot, Brooklyn, NY
- Why Look at Animals? Artspace, New Haven, CT
- Fine Arts Work Center Fellows Exhibit, Provincetown Art Museum, Provincetown, MA
- SCOPE, Miami, FL

2006

- MAD COW: Absurdity and Anxiety in Contemporary Culture NURTUREart Gallery, Brooklyn, NY
- SCOPE New York Art Fair, presented by Jack the Pelican Presents, Brooklyn, NY
- Allergy, Gallery Velvet, Seoul, Korea
- 2006 Fellows and Jurors, Hudson D. Walker Gallery, Provincetown, MA

2005

- Project Diversity, Tabla Rasa Gallery, Brooklyn, NY, Rush Philanthropic Arts Foundation
- Biennial, Detroit Artists' Market, Detroit, MI

2003

- A Bestiary, 55 Mercer Gallery, New York, NY
- Member's Invitational, Detroit Artists' Market, Detroit, MI

2002

- Biennial, Detroit Artists' Market 70th Anniversary, Detroit, MI
- Dealer's Select, Detroit Artists' Market, Detroit, MI

2001

- Fresh Paint, Robert Kidd Gallery, Birmingham, MI

2000

- Constructed Images, Mott Community College, Flint, MI
- Cranbrook Connection, D'Arcy, Troy, MI
- How Are You? Cranbrook Art Museum, Forum Gallery, Bloomfield Hills, MI

== Art pieces ==
- Goat - 2006
- A Rough Start - 2007
- Antics - 2007
- Pack - 2007
- A Small Disturbance - 2008
- A Map Is Not The Territory - 2008
- Untitled (Black Bear) - 2008
- Little Girl - 2008
- Matriarch - 2009
- Bully - 2010
- Untitled (Female Bust) - 2011

Kate Clark's work has been collected internationally and is in public collections such as the David Roberts Art Foundation in London and the C-Collection in Switzerland. Her awards and residencies are as follows: Marie Walsh Sharpe Art Foundation, Space Program, New York, Sept 2011- August 2012 Fine Arts Work Center, Winter Fellowship, Provincetown, Massachusetts October 2006 - May 2007 Jentel Artist Residency Program, Banner, Wyoming October - November 2005
