= Clive Clark =

Clive Clark may refer to:

- Clive Clark (golfer) (born 1945), English golfer
- Clive Clark (footballer) (1940–2014), English former footballer

== See also ==
- Clive Clarke (born 1980), Irish footballer
