= Robert Gagosian =

American oceanographer (born 1944)

Robert B. Gagosian (born September 17, 1944) is an American oceanographer. In 2016, he is acting president of the Desert Research Institute in Nevada. Gagosian served as president and CEO of the Consortium for Ocean Leadership in Washington, D.C., from 2007 to 2015, where he is currently president emeritus. Gagosian served as president and director of the Woods Hole Oceanographic Institution (WHOI) from 1994 to 2006, where he is currently president emeritus.

== Early life and education ==
Gagosian was born in Medford, Massachusetts to Ben and Anne Gagosian, and attended Medford High School. He received a bachelor's degree in chemistry from the Massachusetts Institute of Technology in 1966. He did his graduate work at Columbia University, where in 1970 he received a Ph.D. in organic chemistry.

== Career ==
Gagosian received a National Institutes of Health Postdoctoral Fellowship, completing research at the University of California at Berkeley between 1970 and 1972.

In 1972, Gagosian was named an assistant scientist at WHOI, where he held a number of positions. He worked as a marine geochemist, including five years as chairman of the chemistry department, six years as WHOI director of research and two as senior associate director, and was appointed director of WHOI, a position he served from 1994 until 2006.

In 2006 and 2007, Gagosian served as the senior science advisor to the director of the Smithsonian National Museum of Natural History. In this capacity, he helped to develop the scientific content of the Sant Ocean Hall.

=== Scientific work ===
Gagosian studied organic substances produced by marine organisms and their transport and transformation as they dispersed through the water column to the seafloor. He participated in four field programs, including the Sea-Air Exchange Program, which he served as an executive committee member, and 14 oceanographic research voyages, including seven as chief scientist. He is the author or co-author of 85 scientific papers. He mentored five Ph.D. students and nine postdoctoral fellows.

Gagosian has been a visiting fellow the University of Otago, Dunedin, New Zealand and the Australian National University, as well as a visiting scholar at the Australian Institute of Marine Sciences and the University of Washington.

=== Professional activities ===
Gagosian has worked on many committees, including ones for the American Association for the Advancement of Science (AAAS), the Desert Research Institute, the National Science Foundation, the Moore Foundation's Marine Microbiology Initiative, the Maine Technology Institute Asset Fund, the Geochemical Society, and the Woods Hole Oceanographic Institution. He has been a member of the Joint Ocean Commission Initiative, Leadership Council since 2010.

He was a speaker at the India-U.S. Workshop on Science, Diplomacy and Policy in 2011 and at the Drager-Stiftung, Drager Foundation, EU-U.S. Conference Series on Sustainable Oceans in Hamburg, Germany, also in 2011. He also worked as associate editor of Geochimica et Cosmochimica Acta, was a faculty fellow of the World Economic Forum, and was a Doherty Lecturer in Ocean Policy at the University of Virginia School of Law.

Gagosian chaired the Oregon State University President's Commission on Ocean, Coastal, and Earth System Futures in 2007, and was a member of the U.S. National Commission for the United Nations Educational, Scientific, and Cultural Organization, the Science Advisory Panel of the U.S. Commission on Ocean Policy, the advisory board of the Hudson River Institute the NOAA Science Advisory Board, and several other committees concerned with oceanography.

Gagosian was co-chairman of the Partnership for Observation of the Global Oceans and vice chairman of the Council on Ocean Affairs.

== Awards and honors ==
Gagosian was presented with the Champion of the Ocean Award (2006) by Monmouth University. He was named a Fellow of the Explorers Club as well as of the American Academy of Arts & Sciences.

In 2000, Long Island University presented him with an honorary Doctor of Science degree and Northeastern University bestowed an honorary Doctor of Science degree.
