= Anne Rogers Clark =

American dog breeder and trainer (1929–2006)

- Born: Anne Hone Rogers; January 6, 1929; Flushing, New York
- Died: December 20, 2006 (aged 77); Wilmington, Delaware
- Occupations: Dog breeder and trainer
- Spouse: James Edward Clark

Anne Rogers Clark (born January 6, 1929, Flushing, New York – died December 20, 2006, Wilmington, Delaware) was an American dog breeder and trainer and one of the few people licensed to judge all 165 breeds and varieties recognized by the American Kennel Club.

She was the first woman to win best in show at the Westminster Kennel Club Dog Show as a professional handler, and she tied for second there among all handlers with three best in shows. Her 22 judging appearances at Westminster matched the record.

== Background ==
Anne Hone Rogers, the daughter of William and Olga Rogers, was raised in Mahopac, New York. She stood over 6 feet tall for most of her adult life. Her mother, Olga Hone Rogers, a successful canine importer, breeder and exhibitor, ran a kennel in Pound Ridge, New York.

After graduating from high school, Anne Rogers started a successful dog department at Abercrombie & Fitch, then opened a dog grooming service in Manhattan. She won her first best in show at Westminster in 1956.

== Writings ==
She co-authored The International Encyclopedia of Dogs and a fixture at the Westminster Kennel Club Dog Show since 1941.

== Documentary film appearance ==
Clark appeared in the documentary film Wiener Takes All.

== Death ==
She died from kidney failure associated with colon cancer, aged 77, in Wilmington, Delaware. She was predeceased by her husband, James Edward Clark.
