= Terence Clarke =

Terence Clarke may refer to:

- Terence Clarke (politician) (1904–1992), British army officer and politician
- Terence Clarke (composer) (born 1935), theatrical director and composer
- Terrence Clarke (2001–2021), American basketball player

== See also ==
- Terence Clark (born 1934), British retired diplomat and writer
- Terry Clarke (disambiguation)
