= Colin W. Clark =

Canadian mathematician (1931–2024)

Colin Whitcomb Clark FRS (18 June 1931 – 12 April 2024) was a Canadian mathematician and behaviorial ecologist who contributed to the economics of natural resources. Clark specialized in behavioral ecology and the economics of natural resources, specifically, in the management of commercial fisheries. Clark was named a Fellow of the International Institute of Fisheries Economics & Trade (IIFET) in 2016 for his contributions to bioeconomics. Clark's impact upon fisheries economics through his scholarly work is encapsulated in Mathematical Bioeconomics: The Mathematics of Conservation, which is considered to be a classic contribution in environmental economic theory.

== Background ==
Clark was born in Vancouver, Canada on 18 June 1931. He completed his PhD. in 1958 at the University of Washington. He was appointed to the University of British Columbia's mathematics department in 1960, working on partial differential equations, spectral theory, and functional analysis, before pivoting to mathematical biology. He married Janet Clark, with whom he had 3 children. As a result of his work in mathematical biology, he became a member of the Vancouver Natural History Society, and a prolific birdwatcher. He died on 12 April 2024, at the age of 92.

== Honours and awards ==
- 1997 Elected Fellow of the Royal Society.
- 2007 Elected Fellow of the Resource Modeling Association. The association's second fellow, for which there have only been 8 fellows elected between 1982 - 2026.

== Books ==
- Math Overboard! (Basic Math for Adults): Part 2. 2013. Dog Ear Publishing.
- Math Overboard! (Basic Math for Adults): Part 1. 2012. Dog Ear Publishing.
- Mathematical Bioeconomics: The Mathematics of Conservation. 3rd Edition. 2010. Wiley Interscience (New York, NY).
- The Worldwide Crisis in Fisheries: Economic Models and Human Behaviour. 2006. Cambridge University Press (Cambridge, UK; New York, NY).
- Dynamic State Variable Models in Ecology: Methods and Applications (with Marc Mangel). 2000. Oxford University Press (Oxford, UK: New York, NY).
- Dynamic Models in Behavioral Ecology (with Marc Mangel). 1988. Princeton University Press (Princeton, NJ).
- Natural Resource Economics: Notes and Problems (with Jon Conrad). 1997. Cambridge University Press (Cambridge, UK: New York, NY).
