= Kelly J. Clark =

American physician and psychiatrist

- Education: Coe College (BA); Fuqua School of Business (MBA); University of Wisconsin (MD)
- Occupations: Physician, psychiatrist
- Known for: Substance abuse disorder Addiction medicine Addiction psychiatry
- Scientific career
- Fields: Psychiatry
- Institutions: University of Wisconsin-Milwaukee; Medical College of Wisconsin; University of Massachusetts; Virginia Tech

Kelly J. Clark is an American physician and psychiatrist known for her work in the fields of substance use disorder, addiction medicine and addiction psychiatry.

== Education ==
Clark graduated cum laude from Coe College with a B.A. in psychology as a member of the Phi Beta Kappa honor society. She received her M.D. from the University of Wisconsin in 1989. She also earned an MBA with a certificate in Health Sector Management from Duke University's Fuqua School of Business in 2007.

== Career ==
At the start of her career, Clark completed psychiatric residencies at the University of Wisconsin-Milwaukee from 1990 to 1992 and the Medical College of Wisconsin from 1992 to 1994. She has been a member of the American Psychiatric Association since 1988, eventually becoming a distinguished fellow in 2011 and a member of the APA's Integrated Care Work group from 2012 to 2017.

From 1996 to 2004, she served as assistant professor of psychiatry at the University of Massachusetts. From 2009 to 2012, she served as medical director for behavioral health at Capital District Physician's Health Plan. She was a founding faculty member of the Virginia Tech Carilion School of Medicine in 2010, where she taught until 2016.

From 2012 to 2014, she served as chief medical officer of Behavioral Health Group. From 2014 to 2015, she was Chief Medical Officer of CleanSlate Centers and from 2014 to 2018, she was medical director of CVS Caremark. In 2018, she founded and became President of Addiction Crisis Solutions, and she also joined the board of drug disposal company DisposeRX.

In 2017, she was elected president of the American Society of Addiction Medicine (ASAM). She served in this role until 2019.

She was vice-chair of ASAM's COVID-19 Task Force.

== Research and advocacy ==
Clark's areas of focus are addictive disease, behavioral health care, and health care payment reform. She has advocated the use of FDA-approved drugs to treat drug and alcohol addiction as a chronic brain disease. However, she acknowledges that there are challenges patients face in obtaining access to methadone, naltrexone, and buprenorphine, the three FDA-approved medications for treating opioid addiction.

She has helped develop guidelines for dealing with opioid addiction in the workplace, medication-assisted treatment for opioid addiction, and drug testing.

She has served as an expert on the opioid crisis to government officials such as the United States Presidential Opioid and Drug Abuse Commission, the Food and Drug Administration (FDA), the Department of Justice (DOJ), the Substance Abuse and Mental Health Services Administration (SAMSHA), and the Office of the Comptroller General.

She has also served as a medical expert witness in multiple legal cases, including United States district court cases involving health insurance fraud, drug trafficking and human trafficking.

== Selected writings and publications ==
- Clark, Kelly J. (22 June 2018). "Most healthcare providers don't know how to treat drug addiction". Courier Journal. Retrieved 15 October 2020.
- Barthwell, Andrea G.; Baxter, Louis E.; Beaubier, Al; Bertholf, Roger L.; Brown Jr., Lawrence; Clark, Kelly J.; et al. (26 October 2013). Dupont, Robert L.; Shea, Corinne L. (eds.). Drug Testing: A White Paper of the American Society of Addiction Medicine (ASAM) (drug testing_ a white paper of the american society of addiction medicine (asam).pdf PDF) (Report). American Society of Addiction Medicine. p. 1-105.
- Clark, Kelly J.; Jefferson, James W. (August 1987). "Lithium Allergy". Journal of Clinic Psychopharmacology. 7 (4): 287–289.
- Clark, Kelly J. (30 August 2018). "Solving the opioid overdose crisis requires a bold approach to prevention and treatment". The Hill.
- Clark, Kelly J.; et al. (15 July 2018). "Expert help to keep kids off drugs". Courier Journal. p. 3H.
- Clark, Kelly J.; et al. (November 2015). Alexander, G. Caleb; Frattaroli, Shannon; Gielen, Andrea C. (eds.). The prescription opioid epidemic: an evidence-based approach (PDF) (Report). Johns Hopkins Bloomberg School of Public Health.
