= Shawn M. Clark =

American lecturer and consultant

Shawn M. Clark (born c. 1964) is an American organizational theorist, a senior lecturer at the College of Information Sciences and Technology of Pennsylvania State University, executive director of the defunct Institute for Global Prescience and a consultant. He is known for his work on strategic sensemaking in organizations.

== Biography ==
Clark received his BA in 1986 from Brigham Young University, his MA in organizational behavior in 1989 from Marriott School of Management, and his PhD in business administration from Pennsylvania State University in 1996.

Clark started his academic career as adjunct professor at Westminster College in 1989. The same year he moved to Pennsylvania State University, where he started as instructor at the Department of Management and Organization. In 1991 Clark became Distance Education Instructor, in 2000 assistant professor and since 2007 at the Enterprise Informatics and Integration Center. At the College of Information Sciences and Technology he was also director of Business Solutions from 2000 to 2001, co-director of its Solutions Institute from 2001 to 2003 and executive director at the now defunct Institute for Global Prescience from 2008 to 2009. As consultant he worked for, among others, Brooklyn Union, Chubb Insurance, Ford Motor Company, IBM, Providence Gas and U.S. Marine Corps.

Clark's research interests are in the fields of "anticipatory socio-technical clue detection engines, enterprise process architecture visualization and alignment, and sensemaking via functional hierarchies."

== Selected publications ==
Books:

- Barbara L. Gray, Daniel J. Brass, Shawn M. Clark. Managing Organizations (1993)
- Brian H. Cameron, Shawn M. Clark. Architecting It Solutions: A Consulting Approach to Systems Analysis and Design. Kendall Hunt Publishing Company, 2008

Articles, a selection:

- Thomas, James B., Shawn M. Clark, and Dennis A. Gioia. "Strategic sensemaking and organizational performance Strategic sensemaking and organizational performance: Linkages among scanning, interpretation, action, and outcomes." Academy of management Journal 36.2 (1993): 239-270.
- Clark, S. M., Gioia, D. A., Ketchen, D. J., & Thomas, J. B. (2010). "Transitional identity as a facilitator of organizational identity change during a merger." Administrative Science Quarterly, 55(3), 397–438.
