= Hannah Clark =

English cricketer (born 1990)

Hannah Clark (born 20 November 1990) is an English cricketer, who has played for Hampshire Women as a left-handed batsman and wicket-keeper.

== Club career ==
Clark made her debut for Hampshire in the U15s in 2004. She played for all the junior ages groups and captained the U15 and U17s. She made her debut for the Hampshire Senior XI in 2006 against Dorset, and has since appeared in the Women's County Championship for the county too.

She currently plays for Hursley Park Ladies as the First XI wicketkeeper.

== University career ==
Clark attended Exeter University and is yet to make her BUCS debut.
