= Colin P. Clarke =

American political scientist

Colin P. Clarke is an American political scientist and national security studies scholar whose work focuses on terrorism, insurgency, and transnational crime. He is a Senior Research Fellow at the Soufan Center and Director of Research at the Soufan Group, specializing in domestic and international security issues. Clarke is an associate fellow at the International Centre for Counter-Terrorism in The Hague, non-resident Senior Fellow in the National Security Program at the Foreign Policy Research Institute, Associate Fellow with the Global Network on Extremism and Technology, and member of the Network of Experts at the Global Initiative Against Transnational Organized Crime. He also serves on the editorial boards of Studies in Conflict and Terrorism, Terrorism and Political Violence, and Perspectives on Terrorism. Clarke previously served as a professor at Carnegie Mellon University and spent a decade at the RAND Corporation as a senior political scientist, where he conducted research on terrorist organizations, insurgent movements, and illicit networks. His work at RAND included studies on the financing of the Islamic State, the evolution of global terrorism, and comparative analyses of insurgencies since the Second World War. In 2011, Clarke worked in Afghanistan as part of the International Security Assistance Force, serving as an analyst for Combined Joint Interagency Task Force-Shafafiyat under General H. R. McMaster. His work there focused on criminal patronage networks and their role in sustaining the insurgency. He received his Ph.D. in international security policy from the University of Pittsburgh Graduate School of Public and International Affairs.

== Books ==
- After the Caliphate: The Islamic State and the Future Terrorist Diaspora
- Terrorism, Inc.: The Financing of Terrorism, Insurgency, and Irregular Warfare
- Moscow's Mercenaries: The Rise and Fall of the Wagner Group
