= Kara Clark =

American wind turbine researcher

Kara Clark is an American wind turbine and large-scale power systems researcher and electrical engineer known for her research on modeling wind power generation. She was elected an IEEE fellow in 2012.

== Biography ==
Kara Clark earned her Bachelor's degree in electrical engineering from the University of Colorado, Boulder, Colorado in 1984, followed by her M.Sc. in electrical power engineering from the Rensselaer Polytechnic Institute, Troy, New York, in 1987.

Clark worked at the National Renewable Energy Laboratory (NREL), Golden, Colorado, on issues related to the integration of significant levels of wind and solar generation into the bulk transmission system. She led Phase 3 of the Western Wind and Solar Integration Study, which analyzed frequency response and transient stability with high renewable penetration.

In Troy, New York, before joining NREL, she worked with General Electric Corporation's Energy Applications and System Engineering group as a principal contributor to many of the key U.S. wind integration studies and the development of dynamic models of wind and solar plants. Her focus was on wind-turbine generators and wind plant controls and included modeling for both cycle-by-cycle and fundamental frequency analysis and analyzing the impact of significant levels of wind and solar generation on power system performance. As a principal contributor to the New York, California and Western Wind and Solar integration studies, she actively participated on the team that earned both the 2007 American Wind Energy Association (AWEA) Technical Achievement Award and the 2010 Utility Wind Industry Group (UWIG) Achievement Award.

She has authored many technical papers and is a registered Professional Engineer in New York.

Clark was named a Fellow of the Institute of Electrical and Electronics Engineers (IEEE) in 2012 citing her "contributions to the modeling of wind power generation."

== Selected works ==
- Clark, Kara, Nicholas W. Miller, and Juan J. Sanchez-Gasca. "Modeling of GE wind turbine-generators for grid studies." GE energy 4 (2010): 0885-8950.
- Miller, Nicholas W., Kara Clark, and Miaolei Shao. "Frequency responsive wind plant controls: Impacts on grid performance." In 2011 IEEE Power and Energy Society General Meeting, pp. 1-8. IEEE, 2011.
- Milligan, Michael, Bethany Frew, Brendan Kirby, Matt Schuerger, Kara Clark, Debbie Lew, Paul Denholm, Bob Zavadil, Mark O'Malley, and Bruce Tsuchida. "Alternatives no more: Wind and solar power are mainstays of a clean, reliable, affordable grid." IEEE Power and Energy Magazine 13, no. 6 (2015): 78-87.
- Denholm, Paul, Kara Clark, and Matt O'Connell. "On the path to sunshot-emerging issues and challenges in integrating high levels of solar into the electrical generation and transmission system." (2016).
