= Chardin =

Chardin is a French surname. Notable people with the surname include:

- Daniel Chardin (died 1709), French-born diamond merchant and Mayor of Madras; brother of Jean Chardin
- Jean-Baptiste-Siméon Chardin, (1699–1779), French painter noted for his still life works
- Jean Chardin, (1643–1713), French jeweller and traveller, author of The Travels of Sir John Chardin
- Louis-Armand Chardin (1755–1793), baritone and composer

Chardin is a component of the surname Teilhard de Chardin:

- Pierre Teilhard de Chardin, (1881–1955), French Jesuit, philosopher and paleontologist

== See also ==
- Chardin Piccolet III, fictional character in the manga series Ranma ½
