= Cora Maris Clark =

New Zealand hockey player and administrator

Cora Mildred Maris Clark
Personal information
- Born: 3 March 1885; Auckland, New Zealand
- Died: 30 June 1967

Cora Mildred Maris Clark (3 March 1885 – 30 June 1967) was a New Zealand hockey player and administrator, nurse. She was born in Auckland, New Zealand, on 3 March 1885. Clark was instrumental in establishing women's field hockey in the country.
