= Ken Clarke (Australian footballer) =

Australian rules footballer (1883–1965)

Personal information
- Full name: Kenneth Peet Clark
- Born: 23 February 1883; Edenhope, Victoria
- Died: 3 February 1965 (aged 81); South Australia
- Original team: Marylebone

Playing career^{1}
Years	Club	Games (Goals)
1903–05	Geelong	24 (9)
- ^{1} Playing statistics correct to the end of 1905.

Kenneth Peet Clark (23 February 1883 – 3 February 1965) was an Australian rules footballer who played with Geelong in the Victorian Football League (VFL).
