= Laura Lee Clark =

Laura Lee Clark (born October 28, 1964) is an American interior designer based in Dallas, Texas. She is also recognized for her interior design showroom, adjoining her design space in the famous Dallas Design District at 1515 Slocum Strret.

== Personal ==
Laura Lee Clark was born in 1964 in Greenville, Texas and graduated from Texas Christian University with a Bachelor of Science in Interior Design in 1987 and Clark has studied at the Parsons School of Design in Italy. She is married to John Falconer since 2004 and the couple has one daughter. Laura Lee is a Delta Delta Delta sorority alumna, and a member of the Dallas Museum of Art, an American Society of Interior Designers Professional Member, a Registered Interior Designer with the State of Texas and a member of the Dallas Museum of Art.
