= Hilda Clark (soprano) =

American singer, actress, model (1872–1932)

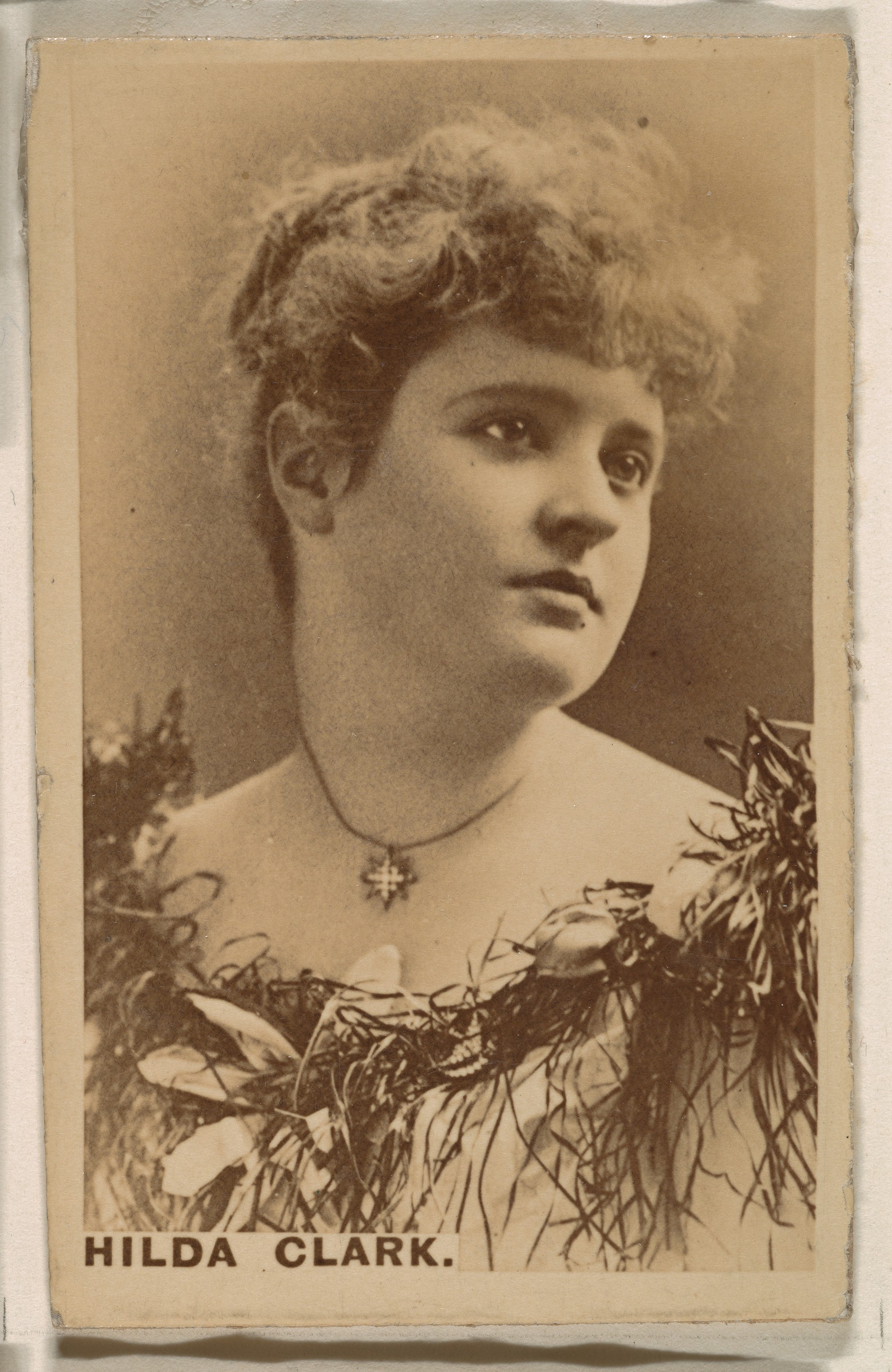
- 1890s advertisement featuring Clark
- Born: December 16, 1872; Leavenworth, Kansas, US
- Died: May 5, 1932 (aged 59); Miami Beach, Florida, US
- Occupations: Stage actress; model

Hilda Kathryn Clark (December 16, 1872 – May 5, 1932) was an American soprano, operetta actress, and model. Born in Leavenworth, Kansas, Clark was educated in Boston, where she began her career as a classical concert soprano in 1890. She then moved to New York City, where she initially continued her concert career and worked as a church singer. In 1895 she had her breakthrough when she was cast in the title role of the Broadway production of Willard Spenser's operetta The Princess Bonnie.

In 1896, Clark became a prima donna with the Bostonians, performing periodically in light operas into the early 20th century. She also worked in operettas produced by Klaw and Erlanger, including a return to Broadway in 1897–1898 as Lady Constance Sinclair in Reginald De Koven's hit operetta The Highwayman. In 1901, a knee injury led her to leave the stage; she intended to return, but her subsequent engagement in 1902 and marriage in 1903 to the millionaire Frederick Stanton Flower led to her permanent retirement.

Clark worked as a model for Elmo Massengale's advertising firm from the second half of the 1890s until 1904. As part of her work for Massengale she appeared in advertisements and on merchandise for Coca-Cola and was credited in 2015 by a representative of the company as the "first Coke ambassador in a print ad." She was the basis for the character depicted in the early-20th-century Coca-Cola advertisement Drink Coca-Cola 5¢. In addition to appearing in print ads, her image was used on Coca-Cola trays and on several "Hilda Clark calendars." The items featuring her image on Coca-Cola products have become valued by antique collectors.

== Early life ==
Hilda Kathryn Clark was born on December 16, 1872, in Leavenworth, Kansas, to Milton Edward Clark and his wife Lydia Ann Clark (née Winston). Her mother was a descendant of American Revolutionary War hero Joseph Winston. Her father was an early resident of the city of Leavenworth, arriving from Kentucky in 1858 just four years after the town was incorporated. He initially worked in Leavenworth as a grocer but ultimately became a banker, initially with Leavenworth's branch of the Second Bank of the United States. He later established his own banking firm in Leavenworth titled Clark, Greuber & Co.

Clark left Leavenworth with her mother in 1884 to pursue training as a musician in Boston. She attended the Prince School there, graduating in 1887. She then pursued further studies in Europe, and received training in New York City from voice teachers Edmund J. Myer and William R. Chapman.

== Career ==
=== Concert and operetta soprano ===
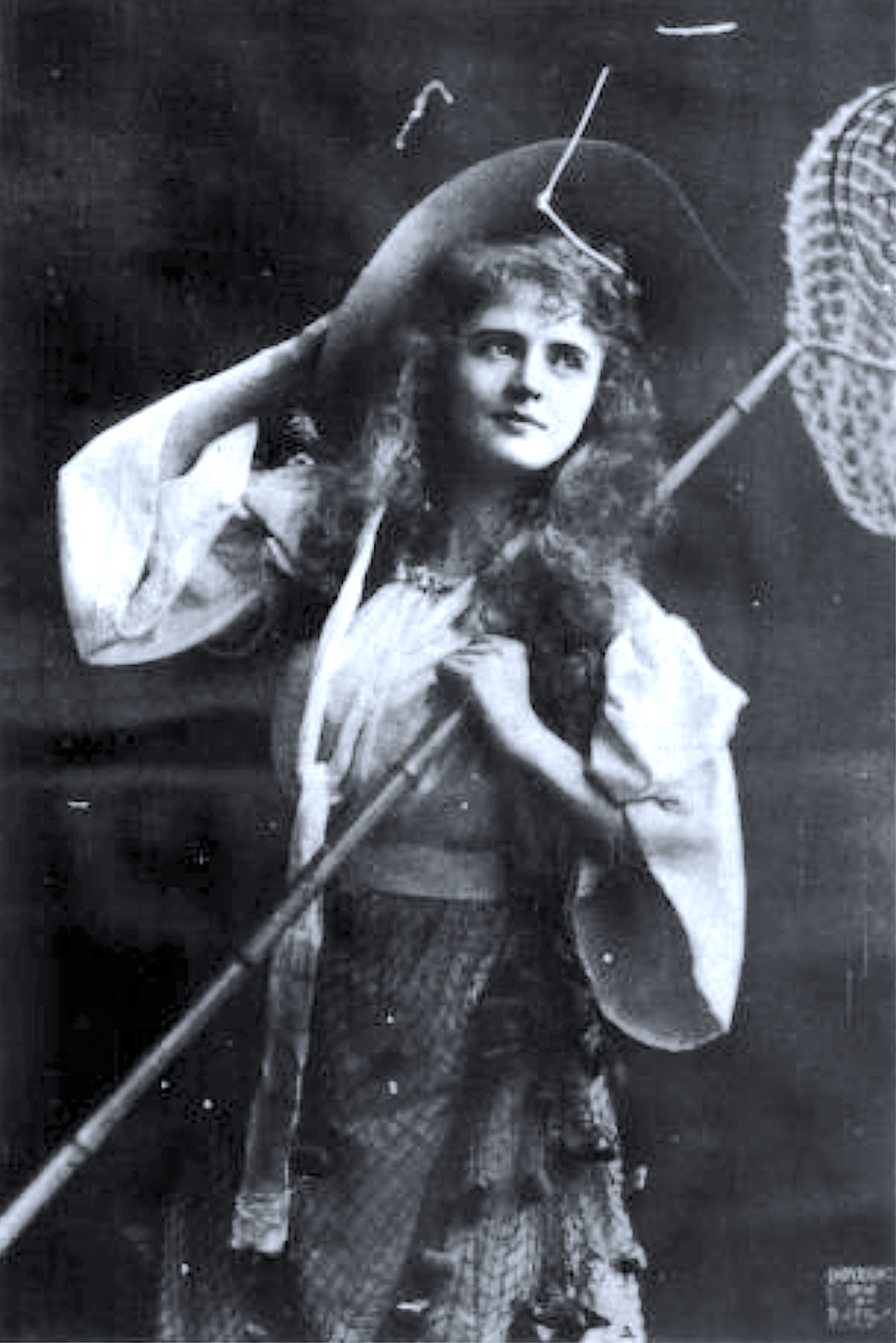
Hilda Clark as Princess Bonnie from the 1895 Broadway production of Willard Spencer's operetta

Clark made her debut as a classical concert soprano in Boston in 1890. In May 1892 she performed at a concert hosted by Boston's Unity Art Club, and on October 13, 1892, she made her stage debut at the Leavenworth Opera House as Unis (aka the Fairy Godmother) in the opera pastiche Zephra. She relocated to New York City where she was a member of the Professional Woman's League of New York. In May 1893 she performed in a benefit concert for the Methodist Episcopal Church given at the Pouch Mansion in Brooklyn.

In 1894, Clark was appointed the resident soprano soloist at the Madison Avenue Reformed Church in Manhattan. That same year she performed in a concert series organized by the French violinist and composer Henri Marteau. She was a featured soloist in a concert at Madison Square Garden under the auspices of the Rubinstein Club. In March 1895 she performed in concerts with the Harmonic Society of New York. She also worked as a soprano at St. Mark's Church in-the-Bowery.

In September 1895, Clark made her Broadway debut playing the title role in Willard Spenser's operetta The Princess Bonnie at the Broadway Theatre on 41st Street. After the conclusion of its Broadway run, she toured with the show to the Park Theatre in Philadelphia, the Montauk Theatre in Brooklyn, the Grand Opera House in Atlanta, the Lafayette Square Opera House in Washington, D.C., the Grand Opera House in St. Louis, the Lyceum Theatre in Cleveland, and a return to Manhattan for performances at the Grand Opera House.

In 1896, Clark became a prima donna with the Bostonians. Her first performance with that company was as Marquita Mason in the world premiere of Oscar Weil and Charles Dazey's opera In Mexico, 1848 which was given for the grand opening of Broadway's Murray Hill Theatre. Her other repertoire with the Bostonians included Yvonne's part in The Serenade, alternating in that role with Alice Nielsen; Maid Marian in Reginald De Koven's Robin Hood; and Arline in The Bohemian Girl.

Clark returned to Broadway in 1897–1898 as Lady Constance Sinclair in Reginald De Koven's operetta The Highwayman. Produced by Klaw and Erlanger, the part was originally created for Camille D'Arville, but conflicts between her and the producers led her being replaced with Clark before the operetta's premiere. Clark was a hit in this production, and according to author Lewis Clinton Strang, the part "established her firmly in the ranks of the light opera prima donnas."

After the close of The Highwayman, Clark toured in the title role of John Philip Sousa's The Bride Elect in 1898–1899, another light opera produced by Klaw and Erlanger. This was followed by the role of Anna in another touring Sousa operetta, The Charlatan. By August, she had left that production and was performing in the theatre troupe of Jefferson De Angelis as Lucille D'Herblay in the operetta The Jolly Musketeer at the Manhattan Beach Theatre. In 1900–1901 she was again touring with the Bostonians in much of the same repertoire she had performed earlier with the company. One new work to her Bostonian repertoire was Victor Herbert's The Viceroy.

Clark's final performances on the stage were in the 1900–1901 season. In 1901 she injured her knee cap, forcing her to leave the Bostonian company before the season's conclusion. While she did not initially intend these performances to be her last, her subsequent engagement in 1902 and marriage in 1903 led her to permanently retire.

==== Critical assessment ====
Clark's voice has been described as that of a soprano leggero. Overall critical assessment of her stage career was highly complimentary of her singing and her physical beauty, but less positive towards her stage deportment. The critic of the New York Dramatic Mirror stated the following in an 1899 review:

There is Hilda Clark, the beautiful blonde Eiffel Tower of comic opera—with a powerful well trained voice and an excellent method. She has a bright, lovely face, an exquisite complexion and hair, but her arms and legs remind me of a young colt's in the way she doesn't manage them. She needs limbering up of some sort, both as to face and movement. It is only in grand opera that people can afford to be self conscious... If I were blessed with all the accomplishments and charms and chances that Miss Clark possesses I should certainly get some kind friend to swat me around home a la Belasco, so that I should acquire ease of pose and carriage.

Lewis Clinton Strang was kinder in his assessment while still highlighting her limitations. He wrote, "Miss Clark has also the added charm of more than ordinary physical attractiveness. She is a blonde of prettily irregular features. Her personality is winning rather than compelling, and her stage presence is good, though there are times when this would have been improved by more bodily grace and freedom."

=== Model ===
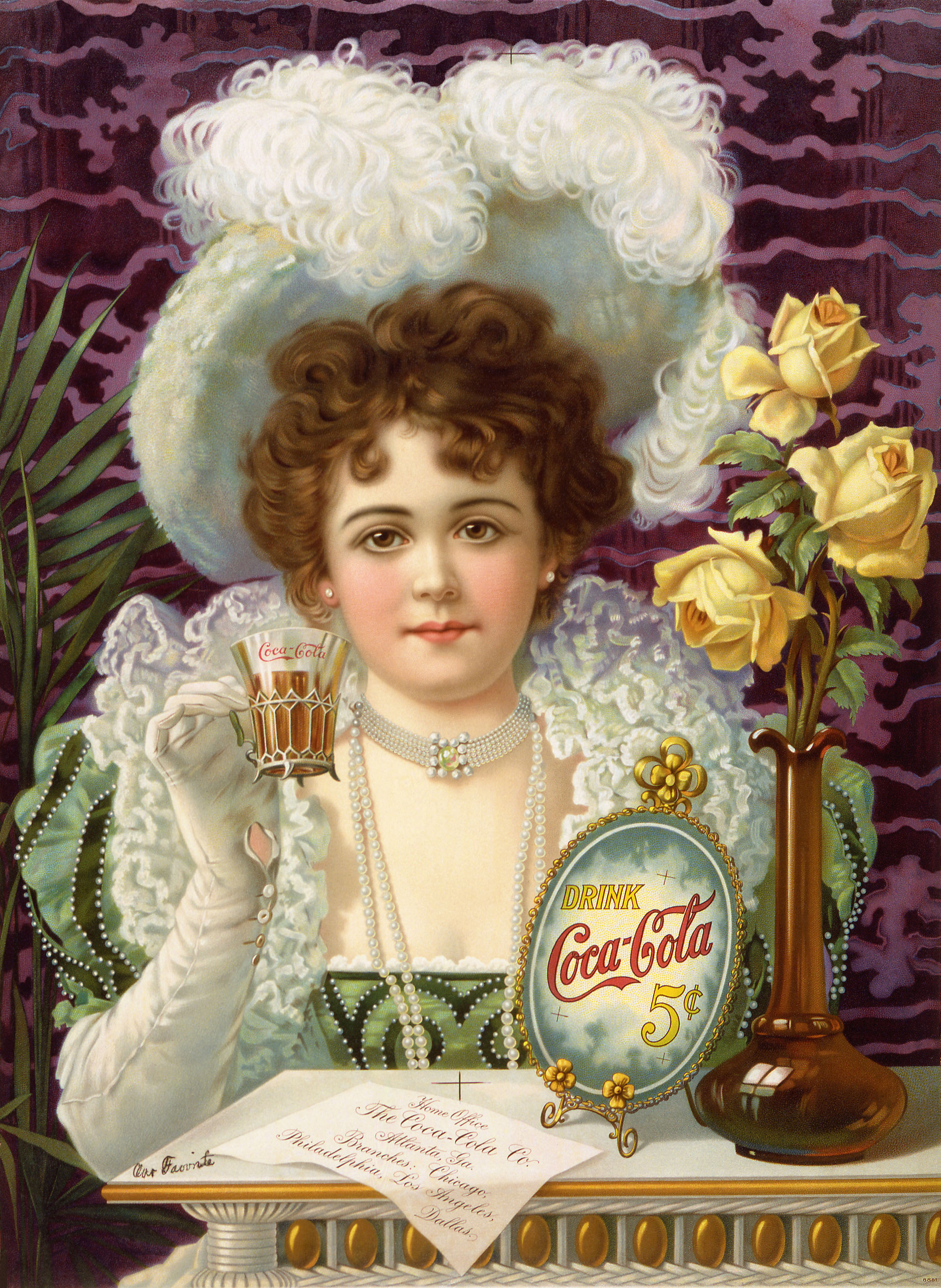
1890s advertisement showing model Hilda Clark in formal 19th-century attire. The ad is entitled Drink Coca-Cola 5¢.

A photograph of Clark was published in Eleanor Waddle's article "Side Glances at American Beauty" in the June 1890 edition of Cosmopolitan magazine, displaying her as an example of the prototypical "Western beauty" in the United States. As her popularity on the operetta stage grew, photographs of Clark, mostly in her stage costumes, were published in other American magazines in the late 1890s, including Vogue, Munsey's Magazine, Leslie's Weekly Illustrated, Judge, and Peterson's Magazine.

Clark was hired as a model by Elmo Massengale's advertisement firm; the agency was responsible for creating the advertisements of the Coca-Cola company from 1895 through 1905. Sources disagree as to when Clark began working for the Coca-Cola company as a model. Historian Gyvel Young-Witzel states that she began sitting for lithographic art made by the Coca-Cola company in 1899, and her image continued to be used by Coca-Cola and other clients of Massengale's firm through 1904. Allan Petretti states her image was used by the Coca-Cola company on a series of tin trays, the first of which was made in 1899 and the last of which was issued in 1904. However, a 2011 doctoral dissertation by Laura A. Hymson (now principal of Bard High School Early College) dates a Coca-Cola tray featuring Clark to 1895 and claims that she was the "first person hired to represent Coca-Cola in advertising." This latter claim was corroborated in a 2015 interview with Joe Belliotti, then Coca-Cola's director of Global Entertainment Marketing. He stated about Coca-Cola, "We've been involved in music since 1895. ... The singer/musician Hilda Clark was the first Coke ambassador [and was featured] in a print ad."

Sammy R. Danna, in his history of Coca-Cola's advertising, states that the earliest 1895 advertisements and merchandise memorabilia of Coca-Cola featured non-celebrity models who appeared as upper-class people in upscale surroundings. He connects Clark's appearance to a shift in Coca-Cola's advertising towards celebrity models in c. 1900, naming her as one of several celebrity "Coca-Cola girls" that also included opera singer Lillian Nordica. She was also the subject of a series of annual "Hilda Clark calendars" made for Coca-Cola in the first years of the 20th century, the last one of which was issued in 1904. The Coca-Cola merchandise featuring Clark has become a valuable antique collectible.

Some of the other product advertisements in the early 1900s featuring Clark included ads for Oxzyn Balm cosmetics and Dentomyrh toothpaste.

== Private life and death ==
In 1901 Clark's mother, Lydia, purchased a home at 353 Riverside Drive in Manhattan and it was reported at that time that the residence was meant to be a place for Lydia and her daughter to live together. At the time of this purchase it was reported that Clark's father, Milton, had been in poor health for several years and that Clark's mother was managing his personal affairs and wealth in New York while he was convalescing in the American West. Milton Clark died in 1904 while visiting Leavenworth, Kansas. It was reported at that time that he had spent time living with Lydia and Hilda in their New York home in the years leading up to his death.

In 1902 Clark became engaged to New York and Boston-based stock broker Frederick Stanton Flower after a lengthy romantic attachment. Flower was the nephew of former New York Governor Roswell P. Flower (died 1899) who had left him a fortune in his will. It was reported in the press that the engagement was vehemently opposed by Flower's parents who did not want their son connected to a "woman of the stage." On February 18, 1903, Clark married Flower in a ceremony held at the Clark family home on Riverside Drive. The ceremony was officiated by Abbott Eliot Kittredge of Madison Avenue Reformed Church where Hilda used to work as a soprano. Hilda then moved into Frederick's mansion at 615 Fifth Avenue.

Clark and her husband never had children, and Frederick died in 1930 at the age of 72. Hilda Clark Flower died on May 4, 1932, in Miami Beach, Florida. She was buried at Brookside Cemetery in Watertown, New York.

== Sources ==
- Benjamin, Ruth; Rosenblatt, Arthur (2006). "Clark, Hilda". Who Sang What on Broadway, 1866–1996. Vol. I, The Singers A–L. McFarland & Company. ISBN 9780786415069.
- Brown, Thomas Allston (1903). A History of the New York Stage. Vol. 3. New York: Dodd, Mead & Co.
- Danna, Sammy R. (2015). "Coca-Cola Company". In McDonough, John; Egolf, Karen (eds.). The Advertising Age Encyclopedia of Advertising. Taylor & Francis. ISBN 9781135949136.
- Munsey, Cecil (1972). The Illustrated Guide to the Collectibles of Coca-Cola. Hawthorn Books.
- Petretti, Allan (1998). Classic Coca-Cola Serving Trays. Antique Trader Books. ISBN 978-0930625962.
- Sheinkop, Eric (2016). Return of the Hustle: The Art of Marketing with Music. Palgrave Macmillan. ISBN 9781137582003.
- Strang, Lewis Clinton (1906). "Hilda Clark". Famous Prima Donnas. L. C. Page & Co. pp. 253–259.
- Wilson, Scott (2016). Resting Places: The Burial Sites of More Than 14,000 Famous Persons, 3d Ed. McFarland & Company. ISBN 978-0786479924.
- Witzel, Michael Karl; Young-Witzel, Gyvel (1998). Soda Pop!: From Miracle Medicine to Pop Culture. Town Square Books. ISBN 9780896583269.
- Young-Witzel, Gyvel (2002). The Sparkling Story of Coca-Cola: An Entertaining History Including Collectibles, Coke Lore, and Calendar Girls. Voyageur Press. ISBN 978-0-89658-454-9.
