= Maudemarie Clark =

American philosopher

Education
- Education: Loyola University (BA), University of Wisconsin–Madison (MA, PhD)

Philosophical work
- Era: 20th- and 21st-century philosophy
- Region: Western philosophy
- Institutions: University of California, Riverside (emeritus); Colgate University; Columbia University
- Main interests: Friedrich Nietzsche, nineteenth-century German philosophy

Maudemarie Clark is an American philosopher and professor emeritus of philosophy at the University of California, Riverside. She is known for her scholarship on Friedrich Nietzsche and for her contributions to the study of nineteenth-century German philosophy. Clark's research examines questions of knowledge, truth, and value in Nietzsche's writings. Before joining the University of California, Riverside, she taught at Colgate University and Columbia University.

== Books ==
- Nietzsche on Truth and Philosophy (Cambridge University Press, 1991)
- Nietzsche on Ethics and Politics (Oxford University Press, 2015)
- (with David Dudrick) The Soul of Nietzsche’s Beyond Good and Evil (Cambridge University Press, 2012)
- (Editor with Brian Leiter) Friedrich Nietzsche - Daybreak: Thoughts on the Prejudices of Morality (Cambridge University Press, 1997)
