= Kelly Clark (lawyer) =

American lawyer and politician

Kelly Clark (August 9, 1957 – December 17, 2013) was an American lawyer and legislator.

Born in Little Rock, Arkansas, he lived there and in Colorado Springs, Colorado. He received his B.A. degree in political science from Lewis & Clark College and his J.D. degree from Lewis & Clark Law School and practiced law in Portland, Oregon. He served in the Oregon House of Representatives as a Republican 1989–93.

He died in Rochester, Minnesota at the age of 56.
