= Hilda Margery Clarke =

English painter and art gallery curator (1926–2022)

Hilda Margery Clarke (10 June 1926 - 13 February 2022 ) was an English painter and art gallery curator who was a student of L. S. Lowry.

== Biography ==
Born in Manchester as the younger daughter of Frank Thompson, she met Lowry when she was aged 14. Her maternal grandfather, architect Arthur Mattinson, had encouraged her interest in art, which was further developed by lessons from Lowry, with whom she remained friends until his death. She had further private lessons in painting when she was posted to Hamburg for her National Service with the Royal Air Force.

After her marriage to Geoffrey Clarke in 1954 she moved to his home town of Southampton where she studied at Southampton College of Art. In 1975 she studied printing at the Ruskin School in Oxford.

Her paintings have been exhibited at Tibb Lane, Manchester; Trends, London; Wessex, Winchester; Hiscock Gallery, Southsea; and John Martin, London. She has had one man shows at Hamwic, Southampton; Westgate, Winchester, and Southampton University. A retrospective of her work was planned for Southampton City Art Gallery in June 2006. She has been artist-in-residence in Ramsgate. She signs her work "H. M. Clarke".

In 1979 she founded the First Gallery with her husband in Southampton. Her work is represented in many private and public collections.

Angus Neill, Director of Felder Old Master & Modern Paintings and avid collector of Clarke's work, considers her "the finest British intuitive painter alive".

== Works ==
- Hilda Margery Clarke, Lowry Himself, (Southampton: The First Gallery, 1992). ISBN 0-9512947-0-9.

== Bibliography ==
- Who's Who in Art, (Havant: Art Trade, 1980). ISBN 0-900083-08-5.
