= Joshua Clark =

American author, editor and publisher

Joshua Clark is an American author, editor and publisher who resides in the French Quarter of New Orleans, Louisiana.

== Hurricane Katrina ==
Clark's book Heart Like Water: Surviving Katrina and Life in a Disaster Zone was a National Book Critics Circle nominee in the category of Memoir/Autobiography. Clark, who lives in the Vieux Carré Pontalba Buildings overlooking Jackson Square, remained in New Orleans during Hurricane Katrina and the collapse of the levees. Refusing to leave the city at an epic time in American history, Clark tape-recorded impressionistic interviews with fellow storm survivors. Clark documented a devastated city, with keen eyewitness notes and recordings. His book is a first-person account, a narrative that reads like a novel. The memoir records his own experience of how the sight of the disaster changed him from self-absorbed to empathetic.

After the storm, Clark corresponded for National Public Radio (NPR).

== Earlier works ==
Clark previously edited two Louisiana-based anthologies, Louisiana in Words and French Quarter Fiction. He runs the KARES (Katrina Arts Relief and Emergency Support) writers relief fund and covered New Orleans in the hurricane's aftermath for Salon.com. Clark, the founder of Light of New Orleans Publishing, has edited such books as Judy Conner's Southern Fried Divorce, Barry Gifford's Back in America, and others. A past editor for SCAT Magazine, he contributes to many publications including The Best American Nonrequired Reading, Lonely Planet anthologies, Consumer Affairs, Los Angeles Times, Boston Globe, Chicago Tribune, Philadelphia Inquirer, Miami Herald, Poets & Writers, Louisiana Literature, Time Out: New York, and he represents Louisiana in the anthology State by State.

Clark also serves on the executive boards of the Tennessee Williams/New Orleans Literary Festival and the Kohlmeyer Circle of the Ogden Museum of Southern Art, and in 2008 started an initiative called QuarterSafe.com to decrease crime in the French Quarter of New Orleans.

== Sources ==
- Times-Picayune (archives)
