= Justice Clark =

Justice Clark may refer to:

- Albert M. Clark (1879–1950), associate justice of the Supreme Court of Missouri
- Andrew Inglis Clark (1848-1907), Senior justice of the Supreme Court of Tasmania
- Cornelia Clark (1950–2021), associate justice of the Tennessee Supreme Court
- George H. Clark (1872-1943), associate justice of the Ohio Supreme Court
- George M. Clark (1875-1951), chief justice of the Michigan Supreme Court
- Greenleaf Clark (1835-1904), associate justice of the Minnesota Supreme Court
- James Waddey Clark (1877-1939), associate justice of the Oklahoma Supreme Court
- Lewis W. Clark (1828–1900), associate justice and chief justice of the New Hampshire Supreme Court
- Marcus R. Clark (1956–2024), associate justice of the Louisiana Supreme Court
- Tom C. Clark (1899-1977), associate justice of the United States Supreme Court
- Walter Clark (judge) (1846-1924), associate justice and chief justice of the North Carolina Supreme Court
- William G. Clark (1924-2001), associate justice and chief justice of the Illinois Supreme Court
- William P. Clark Jr. (1931-2013), associate justice of the California Supreme Court

== See also ==
- Judge Clark (disambiguation)
- Justice Clarke (disambiguation)
