= Andrew Clarke (cricketer, born 1975) =

English cricketer (born 1975)

Personal information
- Full name: Andrew John Clarke
- Born: 9 November 1975 (age 51); Brentwood, Essex, England
- Batting: Left-handed
- Bowling: Right-arm medium

Domestic team information
- Years: Team
- 2007–2009: Cambridgeshire
- 2001–2004: Essex
- 2001: Essex Cricket Board

Career statistics
Competition	FC	LA	T20
Matches	10	41	4
Runs scored	179	63	11
Batting average	14.91	5.72	11.00
100s/50s	–/–	–/–	–/–
Top score	41	18	6
Balls bowled	1,359	1,590	72
Wickets	26	53	2
Bowling average	29.30	24.41	46.00
5 wickets in innings	1	–	–
10 wickets in match	–	–	–
Best bowling	5/54	4/28	1/18
Catches/stumpings	4/–	9/–	1/–
- Source: Cricinfo, 7 November 2010

Andrew John Clarke (born 9 November 1975) is an English cricketer. Clarke is a left-handed batsman who bowls right-arm medium pace. He was born at Brentwood, Essex.

Clarke made his debut in List A cricket for the Essex Cricket Board against Suffolk in the 2001 Cheltenham & Gloucester Trophy. It was in that format of the game that his debut for Essex came against Middlesex in 2001. From 2001 to 2004, he represented Essex in 40 List A matches, the last of which came against Warwickshire in the 2004 totesport League. In his 40 List A matches for Essex, he took 53 wickets at a bowling average of 24.05, with best figures of 4/28.

Clarke made his first-class debut for Essex against Glamorgan in the 2002 County Championship. From 2002 to 2004, he represented the county in 10 first-class matches, the last of which came against Derbyshire. In his 10 first-class matches, he scored 179 runs at a batting average of 14.91, with a high score of 41. In the field he took 4 catches. With the ball he took 26 wickets at an average of 29.30, with a single five wicket haul which gave him best figures of 5/54.

Clarke made his Twenty20 debut for Essex in the 2004 Twenty20 Cup against Hampshire. During the 2004 competition he played 4 matches, the last of which came against Sussex. In his 4 matches he took 2 wickets at an average of 46.00, with best figures of 1/18.

In 2007, he joined Cambridgeshire. His debut in the Minor Counties Championship came against Suffolk. From 2007 to 2008, he represented the county in 4 Championship matches, the last of which came against Hertfordshire. Clarke's debut in the MCCA Knockout Trophy for Cambridgeshire came against Wiltshire in 2007. From 2007 to 2009, he played 10 Trophy matches for the county, the last of which came against Lincolnshire.
