= Justice Clarke (disambiguation) =

Justice Clarke refers to John Hessin Clarke, associate justice of the United States Supreme Court. Justice Clarke may also refer to:

- Harold G. Clarke (1927–2013), chief justice of the Georgia Supreme Court
- Joseph Clarke (Rhode Island) (fl. 1750s-1760s), associate justice of the Rhode Island Supreme Court
- Percy T. Clarke (1885–1957), associate justice of the Maine Supreme Judicial Court
- Simeon Clarke Jr. (1742–1820), associate justice of the Rhode Island Supreme Court
- William Clarke (justice) (died c. 1706), associate justice of the Supreme Court of the Lower Counties of Delaware from 1684 to 1706, and an associate justice and chief justice of the Provincial Supreme Court of Pennsylvania from 1684 to 1693

== See also ==
- Justice Clark (disambiguation)
