= Annie W. Clark =

American social reformer

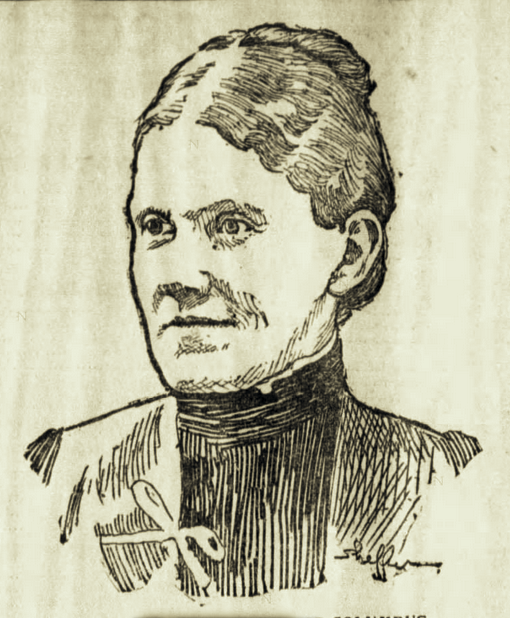
- Born: Annie Wood Clark; August 21, 1843; Meadville, Pennsylvania, U.S.
- Died: July 3, 1907; Columbus, Ohio, U.S.
- Occupation: social reformer
- Known for: president, Ohio Woman's Christian Temperance Union

Annie W. Clark (August 21, 1843 – July 3, 1907) was an American social reformer and leader in the temperance movement. She served as president of the Ohio Woman's Christian Temperance Union (WCTU).

== Early life and education ==
Annie Wood Clark was born at Meadville, Pennsylvania, on August 21, 1843. Her father, Dr. Homer Jackson Clark (1803–1875), was president of Allegheny College at the time of her birth. Her mother was Agnes Poage Wilson (1805-1880). Annie had four older siblings, Emily (b. 1826), Louisa (b. 1834), Stephen (b. 1835), and Mary (b. 1838).

Later, the family removed to Pittsburgh, Pennsylvania, where Annie attended the public schools, afterward entering Mt. Union College, Alliance, Ohio. Here, the older sister was a member of the faculty, the family home having been established there in 1860.

== Career ==
On March 29, 1866, in Ohio, she married Charles Theodore Clark (1845-1911), of Alliance, Ohio, who was elected Worthy Chief of the local Lodge of International Organisation of Good Templars, the bride becoming Chaplain.

When the Woman’s Temperance Crusade started in Ohio, Clark’s home was in Columbus where she joined the band of women in their street meetings and took an active part in all the features of the movement. She was a charter member of the Northside WCTU in Columbus, and was elected county president in 1889. She engaged actively in the work of organizing Franklin County, Ohio, and served successively as a member of the State executive committee, State corresponding secretary, and State president. She was elected to the latter position in 1897 and was retained in office until her death. Clark’s administration was characterized by incessant activity on the platform and in the councils of the various groups of workers wherever help was most needed. She made large use of literature and of circular letters, often bearing the expense herself when the State fund for such purposes was exhausted.

Clark was a member, and for fifteen years vice-president, of the board of trustees of the Women’s Temple, Chicago.

== Personal life ==
In religion, she was a member of the Methodist Episcopal Church.

Clark’s health had long been a matter of concern to her friends, and she herself had been trying to find an opportunity for rest before her death. The American Issue in the number which announced her death wrote:—

"When we find a woman who can do things we overload her. When we have killed her, we lay flowers on her casket. There are ten thousand women in Ohio who could have been better spared who are now junketing about at watering places spending the money a little of which would have given Mrs. Clark the help she needed and prolonged her most useful life."

Annie W. Clark died of pneumonia in Columbus, Ohio, on July 3, 1907.
