= 1955 in baseball =

The following are the baseball events of the year 1955 throughout the world.

== Champions ==
=== Major League Baseball ===
- World Series: Brooklyn Dodgers over New York Yankees (4–3); Johnny Podres, MVP
- All-Star Game, July 12 at County Stadium: National League, 6–5 (12 innings)

=== Other champions ===
- College World Series: Wake Forest University
- Japan Series: Yomiuri Giants over Nankai Hawks (4–3)
- Global World Series: USA over Hawaii
- Little League World Series: Morrisville, Pennsylvania
- Pan American Games: Dominican Republic over USA

Winter Leagues

- 1955 Caribbean Series: Cangrejeros de Santurce
- Cuban League: Alacranes del Almendares
- Dominican Republic League: Leones del Escogido
- Mexican Pacific League: Venados de Mazatlán
- Panamanian League: Carta Vieja Yankees
- Puerto Rican League: Cangrejeros de Santurce
- Venezuelan League: Navegantes del Magallanes

== Awards and honors ==
- Baseball Hall of Fame
  - Frank Baker
  - Joe DiMaggio
  - Ted Lyons
  - Dazzy Vance
  - Gabby Hartnett
  - Ray Schalk
- MLB Most Valuable Player
  - Roy Campanella (BRO, National)
  - Yogi Berra (NYY, American)
- MLB Rookie of the Year
  - Bill Virdon (STL, National)
  - Herb Score (CLE, American)

== Statistical leaders ==
	American League		National League	
Stat	Player	Total	Player	Total
AVG	Al Kaline (DET)	.340	Richie Ashburn (PHI)	.338
HR	Mickey Mantle (NYY)	37	Willie Mays (NYG)	51
RBI	Ray Boone (DET); Jackie Jensen (BOS)	116	Duke Snider (BRO)	136
W	Whitey Ford (NYY); Bob Lemon (CLE); Frank Sullivan (BOS)	18	Robin Roberts (PHI)	23
ERA	Billy Pierce (CWS)	1.97	Bob Friend (PIT)	2.83
K	Herb Score (CLE)	245	Sam Jones (CHC)	198

== Major league baseball final standings ==
=== American League final standings ===
American League
Team	W	L	Pct.	GB	Home	Road
New York Yankees	96	58	.623	—	52‍–‍25	44‍–‍33
Cleveland Indians	93	61	.604	3	49‍–‍28	44‍–‍33
Chicago White Sox	91	63	.591	5	49‍–‍28	42‍–‍35
Boston Red Sox	84	70	.545	12	47‍–‍31	37‍–‍39
Detroit Tigers	79	75	.513	17	46‍–‍31	33‍–‍44
Kansas City Athletics	63	91	.409	33	33‍–‍43	30‍–‍48
Baltimore Orioles	57	97	.370	39	30‍–‍47	27‍–‍50
Washington Senators	53	101	.344	43	28‍–‍49	25‍–‍52

Locations of teams for the 1955–1960 American League seasons
American League

=== National League final standings ===
National League
Team	W	L	Pct.	GB	Home	Road
Brooklyn Dodgers	98	55	.641	—	56‍–‍21	42‍–‍34
Milwaukee Braves	85	69	.552	13½	46‍–‍31	39‍–‍38
New York Giants	80	74	.519	18½	44‍–‍35	36‍–‍39
Philadelphia Phillies	77	77	.500	21½	46‍–‍31	31‍–‍46
Cincinnati Redlegs	75	79	.487	23½	46‍–‍31	29‍–‍48
Chicago Cubs	72	81	.471	26	43‍–‍33	29‍–‍48
St. Louis Cardinals	68	86	.442	30½	41‍–‍36	27‍–‍50
Pittsburgh Pirates	60	94	.390	38½	36‍–‍39	24‍–‍55

Locations of teams for the 1953–1957 National League seasons
National League

== Nippon Professional Baseball final standings ==
=== Central League final standings ===
Central League	G	W	L	T	Pct.	GB
Yomiuri Giants	130	92	37	1	.713	—
Osaka Tigers	130	77	52	1	.597	15.0
Chunichi Dragons	130	71	57	2	.555	20.5
Hiroshima Carp	130	58	70	2	.453	33.5
Kokutetsu Swallows	130	57	71	2	.445	34.5
Taiyo Whales	130	31	99	0	.238	61.5

=== Pacific League final standings ===
Pacific League	G	W	L	T	Pct.	GB
Nankai Hawks	143	99	41	3	.707	—
Nishitetsu Lions	144	90	50	4	.643	9.0
Mainichi Orions	142	85	55	2	.607	14.0
Hankyu Braves	142	80	60	2	.571	19.0
Kintetsu Pearls	142	60	80	2	.429	39.0
Daiei Stars	141	53	87	1	.379	46.0
Toei Flyers	143	51	89	3	.364	48.0
Tombo Unions	141	42	98	1	.300	57.0

== Events ==
=== January ===
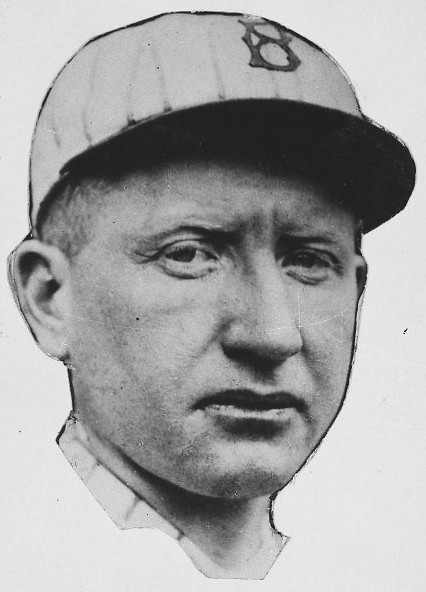
Dazzy Vance

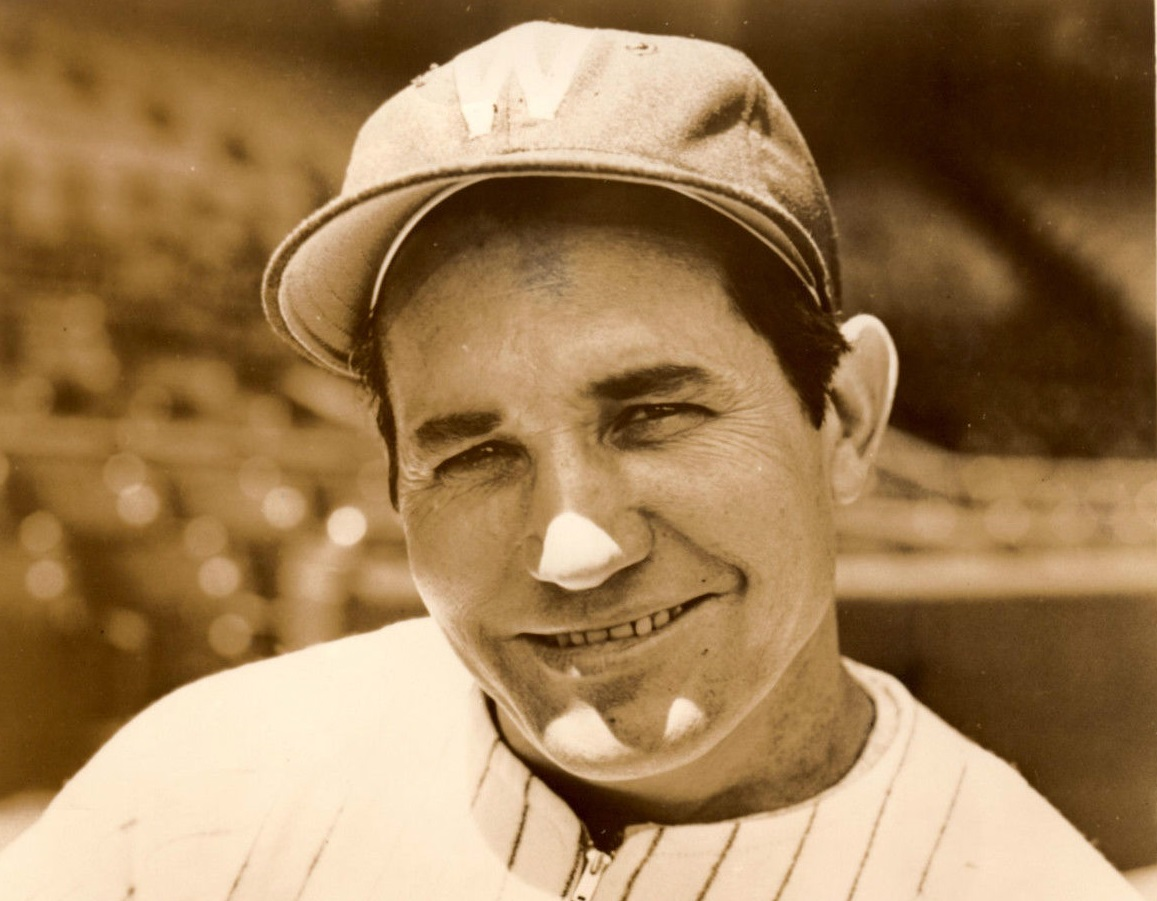
Connie Marrero

- January 5 – The move west to Kansas City by the Athletics franchise will bring limited air travel to the American League; visiting clubs previously traveled by rail to each league city.
- January 7 – Commissioner Ford Frick approves the 1955 contract of seven-time former National League home-run king and future Hall of Famer Ralph Kiner, which calls for a 25% pay cut. Kiner, 32, acquired by the Cleveland Indians from the Chicago Cubs during the off-season, had negotiated for even greater cut in pay, a reported 38% reduction from his $65,000 1954 earnings, but Frick had held up approval of the arrangement.
- January 15 – Catcher Mickey Owen, whose MLB career includes four National League All-Star team selections, a momentum-changing error in the 1941 World Series, and almost four prime years lost due to his suspension for "jumping" to the Mexican League in 1946, is released by the Boston Red Sox. Owen, 38, will remain in the majors for two more years as a coach on Pinky Higgins' Red Sox staff.
- January 16 – The once-stable eight-team lineup of the Triple-A American Association will undergo a significant change in 1955, with Denver and Omaha replacing Kansas City and Columbus. The relocation of the Athletics drives the Kansas City-to-Denver move, while deteriorating attendance is behind the transfer of the Columbus franchise. The loss of Denver and Omaha weakens the Western League, which will play only four more years before shutting down.
  - On January 29, the Triple-A International League will welcome Columbus as the new home of the transferred Ottawa A's.
- January 20 – The last remnants of the Philadelphia Athletics—portraits of Hall of Famers including Jimmie Foxx, Lefty Grove, Al Simmons, Rube Waddell and Mack himself—are removed from Connie Mack Stadium and shipped westward to Kansas City. New club owner Arnold Johnson torpedoes the Mack family's suggestion that the mementos be donated to Cooperstown, saying he wants to display them in the team's new home.
- January 24
  - In an effort to speed up the game, Major League Baseball announces a new rule which requires a pitcher to deliver the ball within 20 seconds after taking a pitching position.
  - The Washington Senators release legendary Cuban pitcher Connie Marrero. The 5 ft 5 in (1.65 m), 43-year-old Marrero, known for his "windmill" windup, is a folk hero in Cuba as an amateur player from the 1930s to the mid-1940s, winning three Gold Medals in the Baseball World Cup. He turned pro at age 36 in 1947, then appeared in 118 MLB games over five seasons (1950–1954) for Washington, and was named to the 1951 AL All-Star team.
- January 26 – Joe DiMaggio tops the Hall-of-Fame ballot, entering the shrine only three years after his December 11, 1951, retirement from the New York Yankees. DiMaggio, 40, receives 88.8% of the vote. Three other luminaries are also voted in: Ted Lyons (86.5%), Dazzy Vance (81.7%) and Gabby Hartnett (77.7%). What's more, the Veterans Committee selects two more honorees: Home Run Baker and Ray Schalk.
- January 30 – The American League follows the National League's lead and delays any discussion of expansion from eight to ten teams. The NL had voted January 29 to defer any plan to expand into attractive minor-league territories such as Los Angeles, San Francisco, Houston and Dallas–Fort Worth.

=== February ===
- February 2 – Five-time American League All-Star right-hander Allie Reynolds retires at age 37. Reynolds posted a 13–4 (3.32) record in 36 games for the 1954 New York Yankees, but a chronic back injury drives him from the mound. He went 131–60 (3.30) in eight AL seasons for the Bombers and 7–2 (2.79) in World Series play, helping them win six Fall Classics in six appearances.
- February 15 – Puerto Rico captures its third consecutive Caribbean Series title when its representative, the Cangrejeros de Santurce, defeats Venezuela's Navegantes del Magallanes, 7–2, to win its fifth game in six outings. Puerto Rico's outfield features future Hall of Famers Willie Mays, 23, and Roberto Clemente, 20.
- February 28 – The National League fines the Milwaukee Braves $500 for opening their spring training camp before the official March 1 date. Three days from today, the American League will fine the Kansas City Athletics $250 for the same infraction.

=== March ===
- March 2 – Cass Michaels, the Chicago White Sox' infielder trying to come back from a near-fatal skull fracture inflicted by a beanball in August 1954, is hospitalized in Tampa after suffering dizzy spells and losing consciousness during the second day of routine spring training drills. After ten days in the hospital, Michaels will end his playing career at age 29 and become a scout.
- March 7
  - Jorge Pasquel, the businessman whose Mexican League briefly shook up the U.S. baseball establishment by "raiding" MLB rosters of playing talent and shunning the reserve clause in 1946, dies in a plane crash in San Luis Potosí. Although by 1948 his league failed its challenge to MLB, 20,000 people line the streets for Pasquel's funeral. (See Deaths for this date below.)
  - Commissioner Ford Frick advocates for the return of the spitball, arguing that it is "a great pitch and one of the easiest to throw. There was nothing dangerous about it." The spitball was banned following the 1920 season. Despite the Commissioner's enthusiasm, the pitch remains illegal.
- March 12 – The New York Giants sign future Baseball Hall of Fame first baseman Willie McCovey, 17, as an amateur free agent.
- March 17 – The Baltimore Orioles obtain pitcher Erv Palica from the Brooklyn Dodgers in exchange for first baseman Frank Kellert and cash considerations. The trade is an add-on to a December 13, 1954 transaction that sent third baseman Billy Cox and pitcher Preacher Roe to Baltimore, which had to be reworked when Roe announced his retirement.
- March 22 – Arnold Johnson, the real estate mogul who purchased the Philadelphia Athletics in November 1954 and immediately moved them to Kansas City, sells Yankee Stadium, which he has owned since 1953, to fellow Chicago businessman John M. Cox. The stadium sale partially addresses "conflict of interest" charges that have loomed over Johnson since he pursued the Athletics (he is a close business associate of Yankees owners Del Webb and Dan Topping)—but, until Johnson's sudden death in March 1960, his Athletics will engage in multiple player transactions with Webb and Topping's club, most of them lopsided and in the Yankees' favor.
- March 29
  - Philip K. Wrigley, owner of both the Chicago Cubs and the Los Angeles franchise of the Pacific Coast League, says that Major League Baseball will "inevitably" come to the West Coast either through expansion or franchise relocation, but he doubts that the financially stronger National League will make the first move.
  - The Boston Red Sox sign shortstop Eddie Joost, a 17-year veteran, as a free agent. Joost, 38, spent 1954 as the player-manager of the final edition of the Philadelphia Athletics.
- March 30 – The New York Yankees sell the contracts of pitchers Ewell Blackwell and Tom Gorman and first baseman Dick Kryhoski to the Kansas City Athletics.

=== April ===
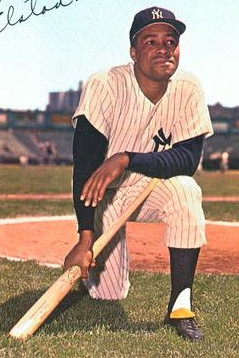
Elston Howard

- April 8 – In one of their final exhibition games of the spring, the Philadelphia Phillies get a scare when two starting outfielders, Del Ennis and future Hall of Famer Richie Ashburn, are injured in the same collision. Ennis is reported to have fractured his left leg, while Ashburn has sprained his left knee. Both men will miss the club's first two National League games, but are able to return by April 17.
- April 11
  - In the American League's traditional Presidential Opener at Griffith Stadium, Dwight D. Eisenhower, the 34th President of the United States, throws out the first ball and watches as the Washington Senators trounce the Baltimore Orioles, 12–5, behind Bob Porterfield's complete game.
  - In the National League's customary opener at Crosley Field, Cincinnati, the visiting Chicago Cubs defeat the hometown Redlegs, 7–5.
- April 12 – After an estimated 150,000 people jam downtown streets for a welcoming parade—and the threat of rain dissipates—the Athletics open their first season in Kansas City with a win over the Detroit Tigers, 6–2, before a crowd of 32,844 at Municipal Stadium. Former U.S. President Harry Truman throws out the first ball and center fielder Bill Wilson scores three runs and goes three-for-three, including the first home run in Kansas City's major-league history. Alex Kellner gets the win, with erstwhile six-time All-Star Ewell Blackwell—who will be released April 30—his only save in an Athletics uniform.
- April 13
  - The eventual combatants in the 1955 World Series, the Brooklyn Dodgers and New York Yankees, get their seasons off on the right foot. At Ebbets Field, Carl Erskine tosses a complete game and Brooklyn scores five sixth-inning runs (helped by homers from Jim Gilliam and Carl Furillo) as the Dodgers breeze past the Pittsburgh Pirates, 6–1. At Yankee Stadium, the "Bronx Bombers" live up to their nickname, thrashing the Washington Senators, 19–1, with Whitey Ford throwing a two-hitter and going three-for-five at the plate, including a home run, and collecting four runs batted in.
  - The Milwaukee Braves sell the contract of veteran right-hander Jim Wilson, 33, to the Baltimore Orioles. In 1954, Wilson, had thrown the first no-hitter in Milwaukee's MLB history and been selected to the NL All-Star team. This season and next, Wilson will be a member of the American League's All-Star squad.
- April 14 – Elston Howard becomes the first African-American to wear a New York Yankees uniform. At Fenway Park, Howard singles in his first at-bat. But the Boston Red Sox win the game, 8–4, behind Willard Nixon.
- April 21 – Don Zimmer is four-for-four, including a homer and three runs batted in, and Joe Black goes 62/3 innings in relief of Russ Meyer, as the Brooklyn Dodgers win their tenth straight game to start the 1955 season, 14–4, over the visiting Philadelphia Phillies. The Dodgers' streak will end the next day when they're defeated by their intense rivals, the defending world-champion New York Giants.
- April 23 – The Chicago White Sox tally a franchise-record 29 runs and 29 hits (including seven home runs) against the host Kansas City Athletics, in a 29–6 ripping. Sherm Lollar goes 5-for-6 with a pair of home runs and five RBI, and becomes the only player in the decade to get two hits in one inning twice in the same game (second and sixth innings). Alfonso "Chico" Carrasquel is five-for-six, and Bob Nieman paces the attack with two homers and seven RBI. Walt Dropo adds a homer and seven RBI, while pitcher Jack Harshman and left fielder Minnie Miñoso also homer. Carrasquel and Miñoso each score five runs. The Sox' early-season explosion enables them to set MLB team highs for 1955 in hits, runs, runs batted in, and home runs. Kansas City gets homers from Vic Power and Bill Renna. Bobby Shantz is the losing pitcher.
- April 29 – The Baltimore Orioles defeat the Cleveland Indians 5–2 for their first win in Cleveland since August 13, 1952, when the Baltimore franchise was known as the St. Louis Browns; it had since lost 27 straight games in the Ohio metropolis.
- April 30
  - The Brooklyn Dodgers hold off the Chicago Cubs 7–5 at Ebbets Field to finish the month of April with 14 wins in 16 games (.875). They lead the second-place Milwaukee Braves (9–6) by 4½ games in the National League.
  - The first major trade of 1955, a six-player transaction, occurs when the struggling (4–12) Cincinnati Redlegs trade catcher Andy Seminick and outfielders Glen Gorbous and Jim Greengrass to the Philadelphia Phillies (8–7) for pitcher Steve Ridzik, catcher Smoky Burgess and outfielder Stan Palys. The trade enables Seminick, 34, to return to his original and longtime team, the Phillies.

=== May ===
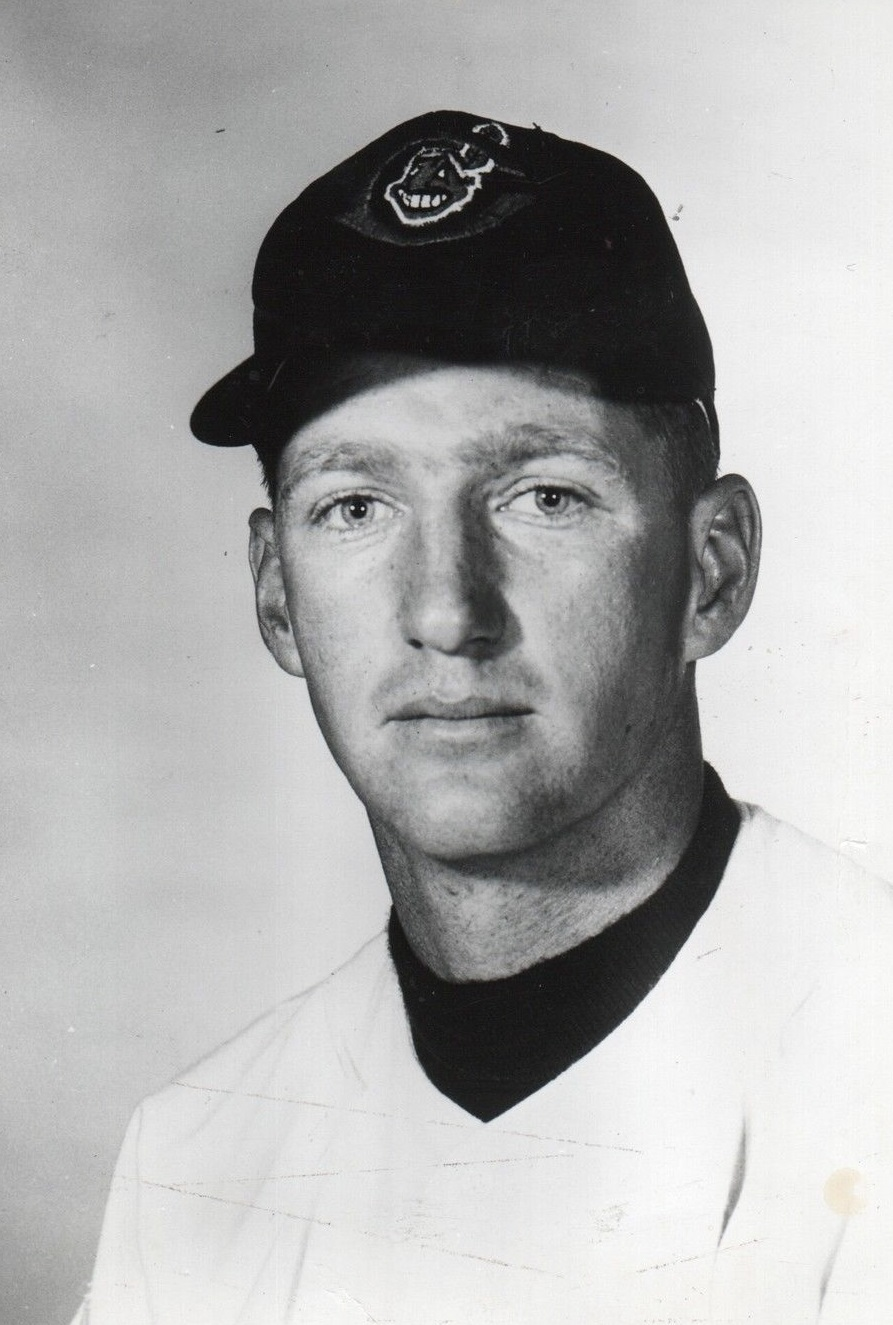
Herb Score

- May 1
  - At Cleveland Stadium, the Indians sweep a doubleheader from the Boston Red Sox, 2–0 and 2–1, behind the brilliant pitching of future Hall-of-Famer Bob Feller, who strikes out only one hitter, and rookie phenom Herb Score, who fans 16 in his complete game victory. Score's 16 Ks top all MLB pitchers for strikeouts in a game in 1955. The sweep enables Cleveland, defending American League champions, to take over first place in the Junior Circuit by a half-game over the New York Yankees, Chicago White Sox and Detroit Tigers.
  - The first marathon contest of the season sees the New York Giants outlast the Cincinnati Redlegs 2–1 in 16 innings at the Polo Grounds. New York's ace left-hander, Johnny Antonelli, goes all the way for the complete game.
- May 9 – In what proves to be a handsome bargain, the Detroit Tigers purchase the contract of outfielder Charlie Maxwell from the Baltimore Orioles. Maxwell, 28, is in his fifth American League season and has batted only .199 with three homers in 138 games with the Orioles and Boston Red Sox. In Detroit, he'll make two AL All-Star teams after breaking into the regular lineup in 1956, and smash 133 homers in a Tiger uniform until he departs in June 1962.
- May 10 – The Brooklyn Dodgers continue their red-hot start to the 1955 campaign. Don Newcombe fires a one-hitter to win his fourth straight decision and future Hall-of-Famer Duke Snider's solo homer gives Newcombe the only run he needs in an eventual 3–0 triumph over the Chicago Cubs at Wrigley Field. Brooklyn's record is now 22–2 (.917) with a +69 run differential, and they hold a 9½-game lead over the New York Giants.
- May 12 – Sam Jones of the Chicago Cubs no-hits the Pittsburgh Pirates, 4–0, becoming the first African-American to pitch a no-hitter in the major leagues. In the ninth inning Jones walks the bases full and then strikes out Dick Groat, Roberto Clemente and Frank Thomas in a row to preserve his victory. It is also the first no-hitter at Wrigley Field in 38 years. Only 2,918 fans are on hand to witness the double milestone.
- May 13 – At Yankee Stadium, Mickey Mantle homers from both sides of the plate for the first time in his major league career. The slugger finishes the game with three home runs – two left-handed and one right-handed, while driving in all of the New York Yankees' runs in a 5–2 victory over the Detroit Tigers. Whitey Ford is the winning pitcher and Steve Gromek takes the loss.
- May 18 – A 19-hit attack, including home runs from Vic Wertz, Ralph Kiner and Hank Majeski, powers the Cleveland Indians and rookie southpaw Herb Score to a 19–0 blanking of the Boston Red Sox at Fenway Park. The fireballing Score, now 4–2 (3.26 ERA), strikes out nine.
- May 27
  - The Red Sox' Norm Zauchin slugs three home runs—a two-run, three-run, and grand slam blast—and drives in ten runs in a 16–0 shellacking of the Washington Senators at Fenway Park. Zauchin's ten RBI are the most by any MLB player in a game in 1955.
  - The 17–19 St. Louis Cardinals fire Eddie Stanky, their manager since the start of the 1952 season. Stanky, 39, has compiled a 260–238–3 record at the Redbirds' helm. His replacement is player-manager Harry Walker, 36, who has been running the Triple-A Rochester Red Wings.
- May 28 – Ted Williams returns to the Red Sox lineup by going one-for-four against the Washington Senators in a 5–3 loss before 9,162 fans at Fenway Park. Williams had declined to sign his lucrative 1955 contract until a contentious divorce settlement was reached. The Bosox had gone 17–24 (11 games out of first) in "The Kid's" absence.

=== June ===
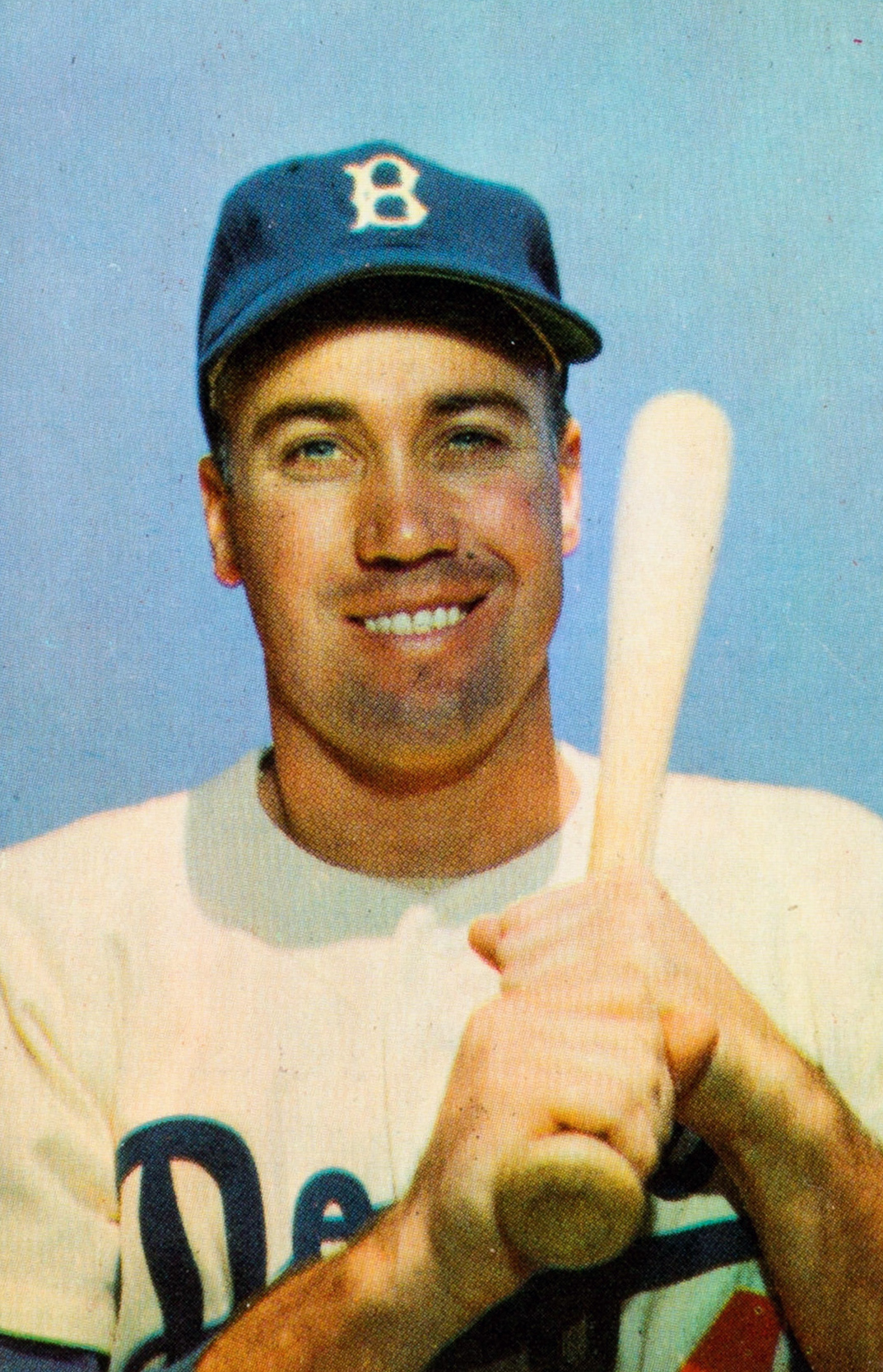
Duke Snider

- June 1 – Duke Snider hits three home runs at Ebbets Field, helping the Brooklyn Dodgers to an 11–8 victory over the Milwaukee Braves. Pee Wee Reese, Jackie Robinson and Roy Campanella also belt solo homers for the Dodgers, to set a franchise record with six home runs in a single game. Although they have cooled somewhat since their 22–2 start, the Dodgers (33–11) still hold a solid 6½-game lead in the National League.
- June 2
  - Sophomore first baseman and fabled local high-school and college athlete Harry Agganis of the Boston Red Sox bangs out a double and single in four at bats in a losing cause in a 4–2 Chicago White Sox victory at Comiskey Park. In the process, Agganis, recently hospitalized for pneumonia of the right lung, raises his 1955 batting average to .313 in 25 games. But, in a tragedy that will unfold over the next four weeks, the 26-year-old Agganis will never play again. Coughing and exhausted, he is readmitted to a Boston-area hospital the next day with pneumonia in his left lung and phlebitis, then placed on the voluntarily-retired list June 16. Eleven days later, Agganis dies suddenly from a massive pulmonary embolism. (See Deaths entry for June 27, 1955.) Ten thousand mourners file past his coffin prior to his June 30 funeral in his native Lynn, Massachusetts.
  - Temporarily assuming Brooklyn's mantle as the "hottest team in baseball," the New York Yankees (33–13) win their 19th game in 22 attempts since May 11 by defeating the lowly Kansas City Athletics, 12–6, at Municipal Stadium. During that time, on May 21, the Yankees took over first place in the American League, and with today's victory they hold a three-game advantage over the runner-up Cleveland Indians.
- June 7 – The Chicago White Sox reacquire center fielder Jim Busby from the Washington Senators for pitcher Bob Chakales, catcher Clint Courtney and center fielder Johnny Groth.
- June 9 – The Cincinnati Redlegs acquire pitcher and 1952 National League Rookie of the Year Joe Black from the Brooklyn Dodgers for cash and a "player to be named later", outfielder Bob Borkowski.
- June 15 – The Cleveland Indians obtain outfielder Gene Woodling and third baseman Billy Cox from the Baltimore Orioles for outfielders Dave Pope and Wally Westlake. Cox, 35, retires rather than report to Cleveland, and the deal is completed when Baltimore sends $15,000 to the Indians as compensation.
- June 18 – The Chicago White Sox vault into a first-place tie with the New York Yankees by taking the first two games of a four-game weekend set at Yankee Stadium. The tie proves to be short-lived, however, as the Yankees sweep a June 19 doubleheader to kick off a 13–1 hot streak to seemingly retake command of the American League pennant race.
- June 24 – "Bonus baby" Sandy Koufax, signed by the Brooklyn Dodgers in December 1954, makes his MLB debut by throwing two scoreless innings of relief against the Milwaukee Braves at County Stadium. Facing his first three big-league hitters, the 19-year-old southpaw loads the bases on a single, error (his own), and base on balls, then escapes unscathed by striking out Bobby Thomson and inducing Joe Adcock to ground into a 6–4–3 double play.

=== July ===
- July 5 – With the score tied 4–4 and two out in the home half of the ninth at Crosley Field, managers Harry Walker of the St. Louis Cardinals and Birdie Tebbetts of the Cincinnati Redlegs scuffle at home plate when Tebbetts, 42, accuses Walker, 36, and Redbird catcher Bill Sarni of stalling tactics during Cincinnati's ninth inning rally. The benches clear and umpire Jocko Conlan ejects the two skippers and Sarni. Tebbetts leaves the field bleeding from the mouth, but—immediately after the brouhaha—Johnny Temple delivers a game-winning single and his Redlegs triumph 5–4.
- July 8 – Light-hitting shortstop Joe DeMaestri of the Kansas City Athletics goes six-for-six (all singles) in an eleven-inning, 11–8 loss to the Detroit Tigers at Briggs Stadium.
- July 10
  - The Boston Red Sox, still weathering the June 27 death of young first baseman Harry Agganis, go into the All–Star break having won 26 of their last 33 games by downing the Baltimore Orioles 10–7 at Fenway Park. Ted Williams, who didn't sign his contract until May 12 because of a pending divorce settlement, hits his 12th homer of the season. The hot streak propels the Bosox into the American League's first division with a 48–36 mark, in fourth place and seven games behind the New York Yankees. Cleveland (five games out) and Chicago (six behind) occupy second and third places.
  - The Brooklyn Dodgers' first-place margin drops a half-game going into the break, after a 3–2 Polo Grounds loss to the New York Giants. The Dodgers still lead the NL by 11½ lengths over the Milwaukee Braves.
- July 12 – In the All–Star Game in Milwaukee's County Stadium, the American League takes a five run lead on a three-run home run by Mickey Mantle off Robin Roberts, only to see the National League tie it. Milwaukee Braves pitcher Gene Conley strikes out the side in the 12th inning, and Stan Musial of the St. Louis Cardinals homers off Boston Red Sox pitcher Frank Sullivan to seal a 6–5 victory. Coincidentally, the 6 ft 8 in (2.03 m) Conley and the 6 ft 7 in (2.01 m) Sullivan will be traded for each other after the 1960 season.
- July 21 – Gus Bell of the Cincinnati Redlegs hits three home runs—all solo shots—to provide his team's only offense as Cincinnati falls 5–3 to the Philadelphia Phillies at Connie Mack Stadium.
- July 23
  - The New York Yankees fall into a first-place tie with the Chicago White Sox by suffering their 13th loss in 18 games, 8–7 in 11 innings to the Kansas City Athletics. The White Sox, meanwhile, have gone 9–3 since the All-Star break, with the third-place Cleveland Indians only one game back of the leaders.
  - The Phillies' Del Ennis belts three homers and knocks in all seven runs as the Phils top the visiting St. Louis Cardinals 7–2.

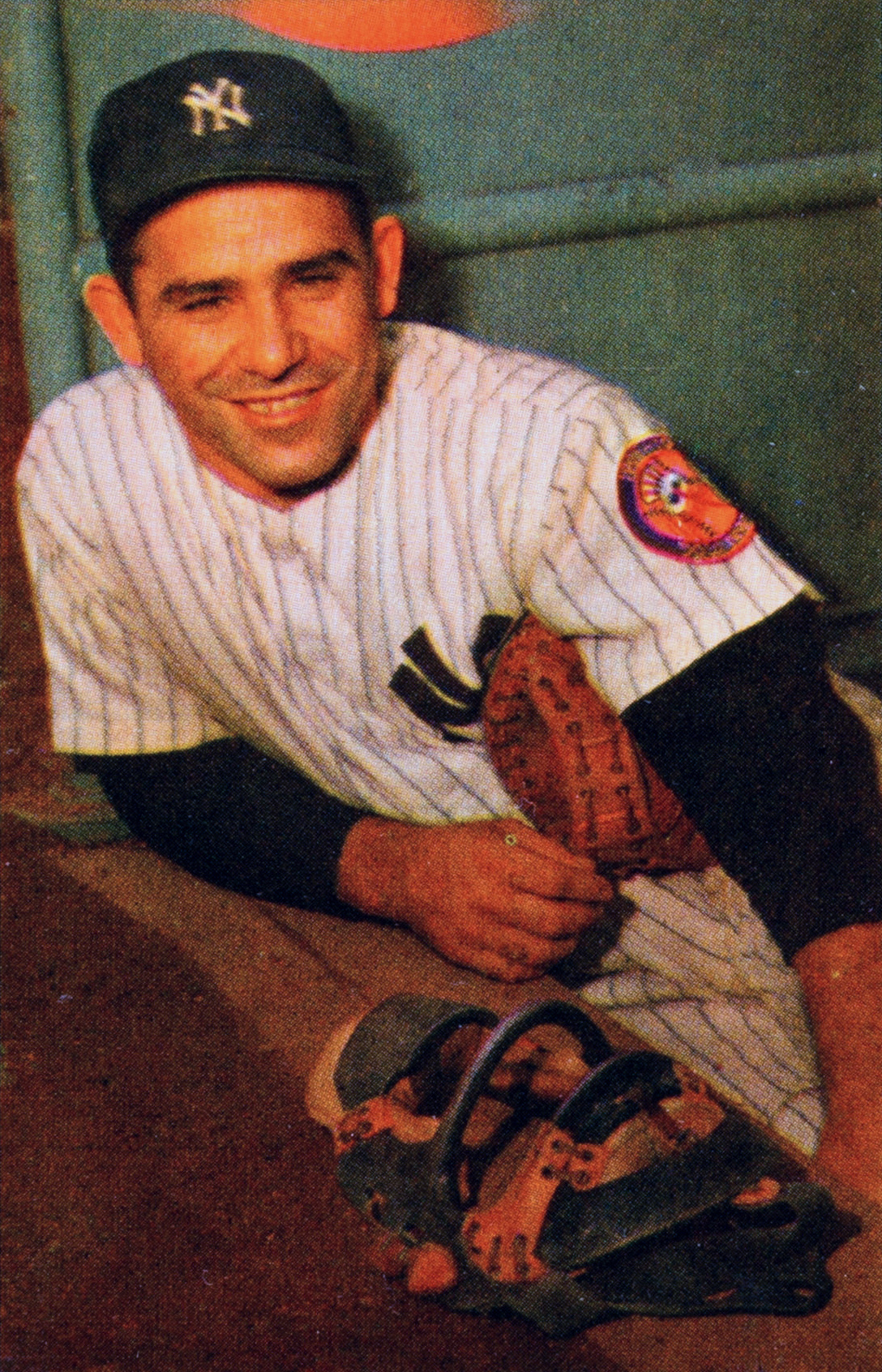
Yogi Berra

- July 26 – In a key nighttime game at Yankee Stadium, the New York Yankees beat the Chicago White Sox 1–0. The game's only run occurs in the bottom of the sixth inning when Yogi Berra hits his 17th homer of the season off the White Sox' Dick Donovan. Tommy Byrne is the winning pitcher as he holds the White Sox to just four hits, all of them singles. The victory enables the Yankees (60–37) to increase their American League lead to two games over the ChiSox (57–38) and Cleveland Indians (58–39).
- July 29 – Smoky Burgess belts three homers, including a grand slam, and knocks in nine runs, leading his Cincinnati Redlegs to a 16–5 victory over the Pittsburgh Pirates. Teammates Bob Thurman (who also hits a grand slam) and Milt Smith also contribute long balls, and left-hander Joe Nuxhall wins his tenth game of the year.
- July 30
  - With a little more than 50 games left in the regular season, three teams are tied for the top spot in the American League: the Chicago White Sox (60–39, .606), Cleveland Indians and New York Yankees (each 61–40, .604). This three-way virtual deadlock, involving the same teams, will occur again August 5 and 6.
  - The Yankees part with veteran left-hander Ed Lopat, trading him to the Baltimore Orioles for right-hander Jim McDonald. A five-time World Series champion, "Steady Eddie", 37, has won 117 games (including the postseason) for the Bombers since 1948.
- July 31
  - On the first anniversary of his four-home run game, Milwaukee Braves first baseman Joe Adcock is hit by a pitch from the New York Giants' Jim Hearn. The pitch breaks Adcock's arm and he will miss the rest of the 1955 season.
  - The contract of the Giants' former ace starting pitcher, Sal Maglie, now 38, is sold to the Cleveland Indians. Since returning from his Mexican League suspension in 1950, "Sal the Barber" had compiled a 90–38 record (a winning percentage of .703), made two NL All-Star teams, and been a part of two pennant-winners and one World Series champion for Leo Durocher's squad.

=== August ===
- August 4
  - With his Chicago Cubs trailing the visiting Pittsburgh Pirates 10–9 in the eighth inning, Ernie Banks belts his third home run of the afternoon, a two-run shot, for a come-from-behind, 11–10 triumph. Banks scores four runs and knocks in seven.
  - At County Stadium, each team slugs three home runs but the Brooklyn Dodgers prevail over the Milwaukee Braves, 11–10, when round-trippers from Carl Furillo and Roy Campanella help them rally for five runs in the top of the ninth. The front-running Dodgers' lead over the second-place Braves is now 15½ games.
- August 9 – The fourth-place Boston Red Sox (64–46) inch their way into the torrid American League race when right-hander Willard Nixon defeats Whitey Ford and the New York Yankees (65–46) 4–1 in The Bronx. The Bosox are now 1½ games behind the first-place Chicago White Sox (64–43), a full length behind the Cleveland Indians (65–45) and a half length behind the Bombers.
- August 12 – The AL race gains a new pace-setter when the Cleveland Indians (69–45) sweep the Kansas City Athletics at Municipal Stadium, 17–1 and 6–5. In the revamped pecking order, the former front-running White Sox (66–44) fall to second, with the Yankees (67–46) close on their heels.
- August 18 – Reacting to a report that the Brooklyn Dodgers and Jersey City officials have reached an agreement for the Dodgers to play part of their 1956 National League schedule at Roosevelt Stadium, Robert F. Wagner Jr., mayor of New York City, says he will convene a meeting with John Cashmore, Brooklyn borough president, and Robert Moses, Wagner's powerful parks commissioner, in support of a new baseball park to be constructed in downtown Brooklyn to replace 42-year-old Ebbets Field. Dodger owner Walter O'Malley has warned that "Ebbets Field must be sold by 1958." Says Wagner: “I am very anxious to keep the Brooklyn Dodgers in New York City."
- August 20 – The Chicago White Sox rally to edge the Detroit Tigers‚ 8–7. Nellie Fox and Jim Rivera pace the attack with four hits apiece‚ while Chico Carrasquel adds a home run. George Kell drives in five runs for the White Sox. The win leaves Chicago (71–46) tied in second place with Cleveland (73–48)‚ and a game in back of New York (74–47).

=== September ===
- September 1 – As the month begins, the Brooklyn Dodgers continue to hold a commanding lead (13 games over the Milwaukee Braves) in the National League, while the three main American League combatants—the 79–41 Chicago White Sox and the 79–42 Cleveland Indians and New York Yankees—are separated by a half-game.
- September 8 – The Brooklyn Dodgers — who are 92–46 (.667) and 17 games ahead of the second-place Milwaukee Braves — clinch the National League pennant by beating Milwaukee, 10–2, for their eighth NL title. The Dodgers also break their own MLB record for the earliest clinching, set in 1953.
- September 10 – At Griffith Stadium, "The Walking Man," Eddie Yost, draws five bases on balls in six plate appearances, but can score only once in the Washington Senators' 8–6 loss to the Kansas City Athletics. Yost will lead American League batters in walks six times between 1950 and 1960.
- September 13 – With veterans Mike Garcia and Bob Lemon on top of their game, the Cleveland Indians sweep the Washington Senators, 3–1 and 8–2, in a Griffith Stadium doubleheader. Attempting to defend their AL championship, the Tribe open up a two-game lead over the New York Yankees, while the third-place Chicago White Sox, only 4–8 in September, fall to 4½ back.
- September 14 – Cleveland Indians pitcher Herb Score breaks a rookie record of 235 strikeouts in a season set by Grover Cleveland Alexander in 1911. Score would finish the season with a league-best 245 strikeouts, along with a 16–10 record and 2.86 earned run average, en route to the American League Rookie of the Year Award.
- September 16 – The Kansas City Athletics score seven runs in the first inning and roll to a 13–7 win over the faltering Chicago White Sox. The third place Sox lose their 10th in 17 games. Héctor López hits a three-run home run in the first to start the scoring and later in the game Joe Astroth adds another three-run homer. George Kell and Chico Carrasquel hit solo homers for Chicago. In the eighth inning, 16-year-old shortstop Alex George debuts for Kansas City‚ handling two chances in the field flawlessly and making an out in his one at bat. George will go 1-for-10 in this, his only Major League season.
- September 17 – Playing without superstar Mickey Mantle, who pulled a hamstring trying to beat out a bunt the night before, the New York Yankees retake sole possession of first place in the American League with a 4–1 triumph over the visiting Boston Red Sox. The Yankees are in the midst of a finishing kick that will see them win eight games in a row and clinch their 21st AL pennant on September 21, setting up another "Subway Series" with the 1955 NL champion Brooklyn Dodgers. Mantle, however, will be able to appear in only three games, with ten plate appearances, in the Fall Classic.
- September 23 – Flamboyant Chicago White Sox general manager "Frantic" Frank Lane, publicly feuding with club vice president and heir-apparent to the throne Chuck Comiskey, announces his resignation with four years left on his contract. By one count, Lane, a compulsive wheeler-dealer, has made 241 trades since taking over the ChiSox front office in the autumn of 1948.
- September 25 – Manager Leo Durocher, 50, and the New York Giants part company, with the combative future Baseball Hall of Famer saying he is "retiring" to enter private business. One of his new ventures will be as a "Game of the Week" color analyst for NBC Sports. Manager of the Giants since July 16, 1948, Durocher led them to a 637–523 (.549) record, two National League pennants and the 1954 World Series championship. It will be a full decade before Durocher manages again in the big leagues. The Giants immediately replace him by promoting Bill Rigney, 37, from Triple-A Minneapolis.

=== October ===
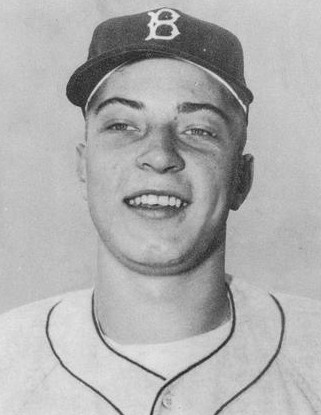
Johnny Podres

- October 4 – There will be no more "wait 'til next year." The Brooklyn Dodgers, behind the pitching of Johnny Podres, bring their first, and only, World Series championship to Brooklyn after seven frustrating previous appearances, with a 2–0, seventh-game win over the New York Yankees. Podres is named the Most Valuable Player of the Series—the first time such an award is given. Dodger left fielder Sandy Amorós makes a clutch sixth-inning catch to rob Yogi Berra of a potential two-RBI double to preserve Podres' shutout.
- October 6 – Frank Lane signs a three-year contract to become the new general manager of the St. Louis Cardinals, replacing Anheuser-Busch brewery executive Richard A. Meyer. Lane had quit a similar job with the Chicago White Sox just 13 days earlier. "Frantic Frank" will soon begin to shake up the 68–86 Redbirds, trading stars (even putting Stan Musial, the face of the team, on the market) and redesigning the Cardinals' iconic "birds on a bat" logo.
- October 25
  - Future Hall-of-Fame executive Branch Rickey, 73, retires as executive VP/general manager of the Pittsburgh Pirates and is succeeded by front-office lieutenant Joe L. Brown, 37. Rickey's five years as GM of the Pirates have produced four last-place finishes—a sharp contrast with the dynasties he oversaw in St. Louis and Brooklyn—but he has done much to lay the foundation for the Bucs' 1960 World Series championship, which will be achieved during Brown's administration.
  - The Chicago White Sox trade shortstop Alfonso "Chico" Carrasquel and center fielder Jim Busby to the Cleveland Indians in exchange for left fielder Larry Doby. The trade makes room for Carrasquel's fellow Venezuelan and future Hall of Famer Luis Aparicio.
- October 27 – "The Old Fox," Clark Griffith, Hall of Fame pitcher and patriarch of the Washington Senators as manager (1912–1920) and president/chief stockholder (1920–1955), dies in Washington, D.C., at age 85. (See Deaths entry for this date below.) He leaves his 52 percent share of the Senators evenly split between his widow's nephew Calvin Griffith and niece Thelma Griffith Haynes. Calvin, supported by Thelma, assumes the team presidency and soon begins to field bids by other cities to lure the franchise from Washington.

=== November ===
- November 2 – The Pittsburgh Pirates name Bobby Bragan as their new field manager, replacing Fred Haney.
- November 4 – Cy Young, holder of the record for most games won (511) in his MLB career and perhaps the greatest pitcher of all time, dies in Newcomerstown, Ohio, at age 88. (See Deaths entry for this date below.)
- November 8 – In a nine-player transaction, the Washington Senators send pitchers Bob Porterfield and Johnny Schmitz, first baseman Mickey Vernon and outfielder Tom Umphlett to the Boston Red Sox in exchange for pitchers Dick Brodowski, Tex Clevenger and minor-leader Al Curtis, and outfielders Neil Chrisley and Karl Olson. Veterans Porterfield and Vernon are former All-Stars.
- November 12 – Former Detroit Tigers pitcher and manager Fred Hutchinson, 36, replaces Harry Walker at the helm of the St. Louis Cardinals. With the departure of Walker, 1956 will be the first year in the National League's 80-year history without a player-manager.
- November 16 – Chicago White Sox owner Grace Reidy Comiskey announces that her son, Chuck Comiskey, who turns 30 in three days, and son-in-law Johnny Rigney, 41, an ex-ChiSox pitcher, both vice presidents, will share baseball-operations duties formerly performed by Frank Lane, who quit as general manager two months earlier.
- November 21 – Carl Stotz, principal founding father of the Little League, sues the organization for breach of contract. The suit will be settled out of court.
- November 28 – The Chicago Cubs trade pitcher Hal Jeffcoat to the Cincinnati Redlegs in exchange for catcher Hobie Landrith.
- November 30 – Virgil Trucks, 38-year-old right-hander who won 108 games during his previous stint (1941–1943, 1945–1952) in Detroit, returns to the Tigers, who reacquire him from the Chicago White Sox for third baseman Bubba Phillips.

=== December ===
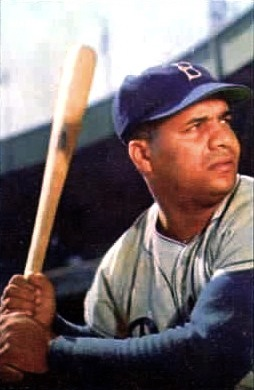
Roy Campanella in 1953, when he won his 2nd NL MVP

- December 1 – Affirming that his Brooklyn Dodgers plan to leave Ebbets Field after 1957, owner Walter O'Malley and the mayor of Jersey City formally announce that O'Malley's world-championship club will play seven National League games at Roosevelt Stadium in 1956. He implies that the Dodgers would play their entire 1958 home season at Jersey City's 21-year-old stadium if a proposed stadium in downtown Brooklyn, still on the drawing board, is not completed by then.
- December 2 – Veteran pitcher Ellis Kinder, 41, is claimed off waivers by the St. Louis Cardinals from the Boston Red Sox. Nicknamed "Old Folks," Kinder excelled as both a starter (23 wins in 1948) and reliever (American League leader in games pitched and saves in both 1951 and 1953) during his eight years with the Red Sox.
- December 3 – New York Yankees catcher Yogi Berra (.272 batting average, 27 home runs, 108 runs batted in, .819 OPS) wins his third American League Most Valuable Player Award (and his second in a row). Berra received 218 points and seven first-place nods to take the award over Al Kaline, 20-year-old star of the Detroit Tigers, who finishes with 201. Because the AL MVP award is announced five days before its National League counterpart, Berra becomes the first player to win three such awards.
- December 8
  - Roy Campanella of the world-champion Brooklyn Dodgers edges teammate Duke Snider to win his third NL Most Valuable Player Award (having prevailed previously in 1951 and 1953). Campanella (.318 BA, 32 HR, 107 RBI, .978 OPS) and Snider (.309, 42, 136, 1.046) tie for first-place votes with eight, but the catcher's slightly stronger vote totals "down ballot" enable him to accumulate 226 points to Snider's 221. He thus joins Yogi Berra as 3x MVP winners.
  - Lenny Yochim of the Leones del Caracas becomes the first pitcher to throw a no-hitter in the Venezuelan Professional Baseball League. The 27-year-old left-hander accomplishes the feat in a 3–0 victory over the Navegantes del Magallanes with the aid of catcher Earl Battey. Ramón Monzant is charged with the loss. Screwballer Yochim is a former member of the Pittsburgh Pirates, pitching for them during parts of 1951 and 1954.
- December 9 – Responding to their ninth consecutive .500-or-below season, the Chicago Cubs begin a revamping of their roster, trading pitcher Don Elston and third baseman Randy Jackson to the Dodgers for pitcher Russ Meyer, third baseman Don Hoak and outfielder Walt Moryn. The Cubs also release veteran outfielder Frankie Baumholtz.
- December 15 – Catcher Walker Cooper, 40, returns to his original team, the St. Louis Cardinals, signing as a free agent one day after drawing his release from the Cubs. During his 1940–1945 tenure in St. Louis, Cooper was a three-time NL All-Star and two-time (1942 and 1944) World Series champion.

== Births ==
=== January ===
- January 1
  - LaMarr Hoyt
  - Bob Owchinko
- January 6 – Doe Boyland
- January 9 – Pat Rockett
- January 11 – Dan Norman
- January 12 – Chuck Porter
- January 18 – Dave Geisel
- January 21
  - Dave Smith
  - Mike Smithson
- January 24 – Ted Cox
- January 26 – Joe Pettini
- January 28 – Joe Beckwith
- January 31 – Ted Power

=== February ===
- February 1 – Ernie Camacho
- February 4
  - Gary Allenson
  - Rusty Kuntz
- February 5 – Mike Heath
- February 7 – Charlie Puleo
- February 9
  - John Urrea
  - Jerry Keller
- February 10 – Mike Champion
- February 12
  - Greg Johnston
  - Gene Krug
  - Chet Lemon
  - Steve Mura

=== March ===
- March 3 – Jim Wright
- March 5 – Steve Burke
- March 8 – Phil Nastu
- March 11 – Larry Landreth
- March 12 – Ruppert Jones
- March 15 – Mickey Hatcher
- March 18 – Dwayne Murphy
- March 19 – Mike Norris
- March 25 – Lee Mazzilli
- March 26 – Dan Morogiello
- March 29 – Karl Pagel

=== April ===
- April 2 – Billy Sample
- April 7 – Bobby Mitchell
- April 14 – Chris Welsh
- April 16
  - Bruce Bochy
  - Rick Jones
- April 17 – Tom Runnells
- April 18 – Bobby Castillo
- April 19 – Mike Colbern
- April 22 – David Clyde
- April 23 – Tom Dixon
- April 26 – Mike Scott
- April 28 – Dewey Robinson

=== May ===
- May 1
  - Steve Lubratich
  - Ray Searage
- May 7 – Bob Ferris
- May 12 – Ralph Botting
- May 14
  - Dennis Martínez
  - Hosken Powell
- May 16
  - Jack Morris
  - Tack Wilson
- May 19
  - Alan Knicely
  - Ed Whitson
- May 21 – Eddie Milner
- May 25
  - Suguru Egawa
  - Andrés Mora
- May 27 – Ross Baumgarten
- May 31 – Larry Owen

=== June ===
- June 1 – Sandy Wihtol
- June 3 – Jim Gaudet
- June 6
  - Angel Moreno
  - Chris Nyman
- June 10
  - Floyd Bannister
- June 10
  - Scott Ullger
- June 13 – Bobby Clark
- June 17 – Joe Charboneau
- June 26 – Manny Seoane

=== July ===
- July 3
  - Matt Keough
  - Jeff Rineer
- July 7
  - Len Barker
  - Jerry Dybzinski
- July 9 – Willie Wilson
- July 13 – Kevin Bell
- July 21 – Mark Lemongello
- July 27 – Shane Rawley

=== August ===
- August 2 – Jim Dorsey
- August 6
  - Ron Davis
  - Steve Nicosia
  - Jim Pankovits
- August 7 – Steve Senteney
- August 11 – Bryn Smith
- August 13 – Odie Davis
- August 18 – Bruce Benedict
- August 19
  - Terry Harper
  - Silvio Martínez
- August 22 – Larry Vanover
- August 27 – Pat Kelly
- August 29 – Phil Cuzzi
- August 30 – Renie Martin

=== September ===
- September 2 – Kazuhiro Yamakura
- September 3 – Don Kainer
- September 5 – Gil Patterson
- September 13 – Mike Fischlin
- September 16
  - Joe Edelen
  - Robin Yount
- September 17 – Marshall Brant
- September 18
  - Don McCormack
  - Ray Smith
- September 22 – Jeffrey Leonard
- September 24 – Gorman Heimueller
- September 25 – Jim Wessinger
- September 27 – Bob Veselic
- September 28 – Terry Bogener
- September 29 – Byron McLaughlin
- September 30 – Carlos Lezcano

=== October ===
- October 1 – Jeff Reardon
- October 3 – Jim Joyce
- October 4
  - Gary Cederstrom
  - Lary Sorensen
- October 8 – Jerry Reed
- October 9 – Alex Taveras
- October 12 – Jim Lewis
- October 14 – Jesús Vega
- October 16 – Kurt Seibert
- October 17 – Brian Snitker
- October 21 – Jerry Garvin
- October 25
  - Tommy Boggs
  - Danny Darwin
  - Jeff Schattinger
- October 29 – Darrell Brown

=== November ===
- November 2
  - Greg Harris
  - Bob Tufts
- November 3 – Mark Corey
- November 5 – Bobby Ramos
- November 7 – Guy Sularz
- November 9 – Jeff Cox
- November 10 – Jack Clark
- November 11 – John Hobbs
- November 15
  - Fred Breining
  - Randy Niemann
- November 18 – Luis Pujols
- November 21 – Rick Peters
- November 22
  - Kevin Rhomberg
  - Wayne Tolleson
- November 23
  - Todd Cruz
  - Mark Smith
  - Dan Whitmer
- November 24 – Rafael Santo Domingo
- November 26
  - Jay Howell
  - Mike Mendoza
- November 30 – Barry Evans

=== December ===
- December 6 – Luis Rosado
- December 7 – Scot Thompson
- December 13 – Paul Boris
- December 18 – Jim Clancy
- December 19 – Kevin Stanfield
- December 22 – Lonnie Smith
- December 23 – Keith Comstock
- December 27 – Gary Weiss
- December 30 – Keith MacWhorter
- December 31 – Jim Tracy

== Deaths ==
=== January ===
- January 13 – Bill Dinneen, 78, pitching star of the 1903 World Series, while winning three games for the champion Boston Americans against the Pittsburgh Pirates, including the first two shutouts in World Series history.
- January 18 – Phil Morrison, 60, pitcher who worked two-thirds of an inning for the Pittsburgh Pirates, his lone major-league appearance, on September 30, 1921.
- January 22 – Bob Wicker, 77, right-hander who pitched in 138 games for the St. Louis Cardinals, Chicago Cubs and Cincinnati Reds between 1901 and 1906; won 20 games for 1903 Cubs; also appeared in 26 games as an outfielder, and batted .205 lifetime.
- January 23 – Elmer Brown, 71, southpaw hurler who worked in 43 games for St. Louis of the American League and Brooklyn of the National League between 1911 and 1915.
- January 24 – Monte Beville, 79, catcher and first baseman for the New York Highlanders and Detroit Tigers in 1903–1904 who got into 145 career games.
- January 25 – Harry Barton, 80, switch-hitting catcher-infielder who played in 29 games for the 1905 Philadelphia Athletics.
- January 26 – Austin Walsh, 63, outfielder who appeared in 57 games for Chicago of the "outlaw" Federal League in 1914.
- January 28 – Bill Calhoun, 64, who got into six games as a pinch hitter and first baseman for the 1913 Boston Braves.

=== February ===
- February 3 – Fred Brown, 75, outfielder over parts of two seasons for the Boston Beaneaters in 1901 and 1902, and later a politician who served as Governor of New Hampshire and also in the United States Senate.
- February 6
  - Rosey Rowswell, 71, radio sportscaster best known for being the first full-time play-by-play announcer for the Pittsburgh Pirates, serving from 1936 until his death.
  - Hank Thormahlen, 58, pitcher for the New York Yankees, Boston Red Sox and Brooklyn Robins between 1917 and 1925.
- February 10
  - Cuke Barrows, 71, outfielder who played from 1909 to 1912 for the Chicago White Sox.
  - Ray Hartranft, 64, pitcher for the 1913 Philadelphia Phillies.
  - Allie Strobel, 70, second baseman who saw action with the Boston Beaneaters in 1905 and 1906.
- February 13 – Clyde Spearman, 42, one of five brothers to play in the Negro leagues; outfielder for five clubs between 1935 and 1946 and led 1938 Negro National League in hits while a member of the Philadelphia Stars.
- February 15
  - Lynn Nelson, 49, pitcher and pinch hitter in all or part of seven seasons between 1930 and 1940 for the Chicago Cubs, Philadelphia Athletics and Detroit Tigers; had a pedestrian mound record of 33–42 (5.25) in 166 games pitched, but batted .281 lifetime with 103 hits, including a .354 season with 1937 Athletics with 40 hits, four home runs and 29 runs batted in.
  - Tom Tennant, 72, pinch-hitter who appeared in just two games for the St. Louis Browns in the 1912 season.
- February 23 – Bill Tozer, 72, pitcher in four games for the 1908 Cincinnati Reds.
- February 25 – Ike Kamp, 54, pitcher who played for the Boston Braves in 1924 and 1925.

=== March ===
- March 4 – Doc Reisling, 80, "dead-ball era" pitcher who posted a 2.45 earned run average in 49 career games for the 1903–1904 Brooklyn Superbas and 1909–1910 Washington Senators.
- March 7 – Jorge Pasquel, 47, Mexican businessman who, as owner of the Veracruz club and president of the Mexican League, was the driving force behind his circuit's rise to prominence after World War II, when it lured 22 MLB players to "jump" the reserve clause for higher salaries "South of the Border."
- March 10 – Rick Adams, 76, left-handed pitcher who worked in 11 games for the 1905 Senators.
- March 13
  - Buck Sweeney, 64, who appeared in one game (with one at bat) as a left fielder for the Philadelphia Athletics on September 28, 1914.
  - Joe Vernon, 65, pitcher whose two-game career included one contest for the 1912 Chicago Cubs and one for the 1914 Brooklyn Tip-Tops of the "outlaw" Federal League.
- March 16 – Red Booles, 74, left-hander who pitched in four games for the 1909 Cleveland Naps.
- March 18
  - Morrie Aderholt, 39, outfielder who appeared in 106 games over all or part of five seasons spanning 1939 to 1945 for the Washington Senators, Brooklyn Dodgers and Boston Braves; scout for Washington at the time of his death.
  - Ty Helfrich, 64, second baseman who appeared in 43 games for the Federal League's Brooklyn Tip-Tops in 1915.
- March 19
  - Ed Hovlik, 63, who pitched in 11 games for the 1918–1919 Washington Senators.
  - George Stultz, 81, pitcher who threw a complete-game victory, allowing no earned runs, in his only big-league appearance for the Boston Beaneaters of the National League on September 22, 1894.
- March 27 – Frank Roth, 76, catcher who played in 282 games over six seasons between 1903 and 1910, principally the Philadelphia Phillies; later a coach.
- March 28 – Tom Lynch, 94, 19th-century outfielder-catcher who played in 42 games for Wilmington of the Union Association (1884) and Philadelphia of the National League (1884–1885).

=== April ===
- April 2 – Reggie Grabowski, 47, pitcher for the 1932–1934 Philadelphia Phillies who worked in 51 career games.
- April 8 – Alfred Saylor, 43, pitcher for the 1943–1945 Birmingham Black Barons who led the 1944 Negro American League in innings pitched and games lost.
- April 10 – Curt Bernard, 77, who appeared in 43 games, mostly as an outfielder, for the 1900–1901 New York Giants.
- April 16 – Louis Graff, 88, listed as appearing in one game as a catcher for the Syracuse Stars of the major-league American Association on June 23, 1890.
- April 28 – Felix Chouinard, 67, outfielder-infielder who played 50 of his 88 career games in the Federal League (Brooklyn Tip-Tops, Pittsburgh Rebels, Baltimore Terrapins) in 1914–1915, after debuting with the Chicago White Sox in 1910–1911.

=== May ===
- May 3 – Newt Randall, 75, Canadian outfielder who played in 97 games for Chicago and Boston of the National League in 1907.
- May 4 – Fredrick Westervelt, 77, umpire who officiated in the American League (1911–1912), Federal League (1915), and National League (1922–1923).
- May 13 – Lefty George, 68, longtime minor-league pitcher (1909–1921, 1923–1933, 1940 and 1943–1944), where he won 327 career games, whose MLB tenure included 52 total games for the 1911 St. Louis Browns, 1912 Cleveland Naps, 1915 Cincinnati Reds, and 1918 Boston Braves.
- May 18 – Harry Wood, 70, Maine native who appeared in two games as an 18-year-old outfielder for Cincinnati in April 1903.
- May 24 – Bob Cone, 61, pitcher who appeared in two-thirds of an inning in his lone appearance with the last-place Philadelphia Athletics on July 25, 1915.
- May 29 – Ray Brown, 66, Chicago Cubs' right-hander who threw a complete-game victory in his lone MLB game on September 29, 1909.
- May 31 – Henry Jones, 98, 19th-century infielder-outfielder who played in 34 games for the 1884 Detroit Wolverines of the National League.

=== June ===
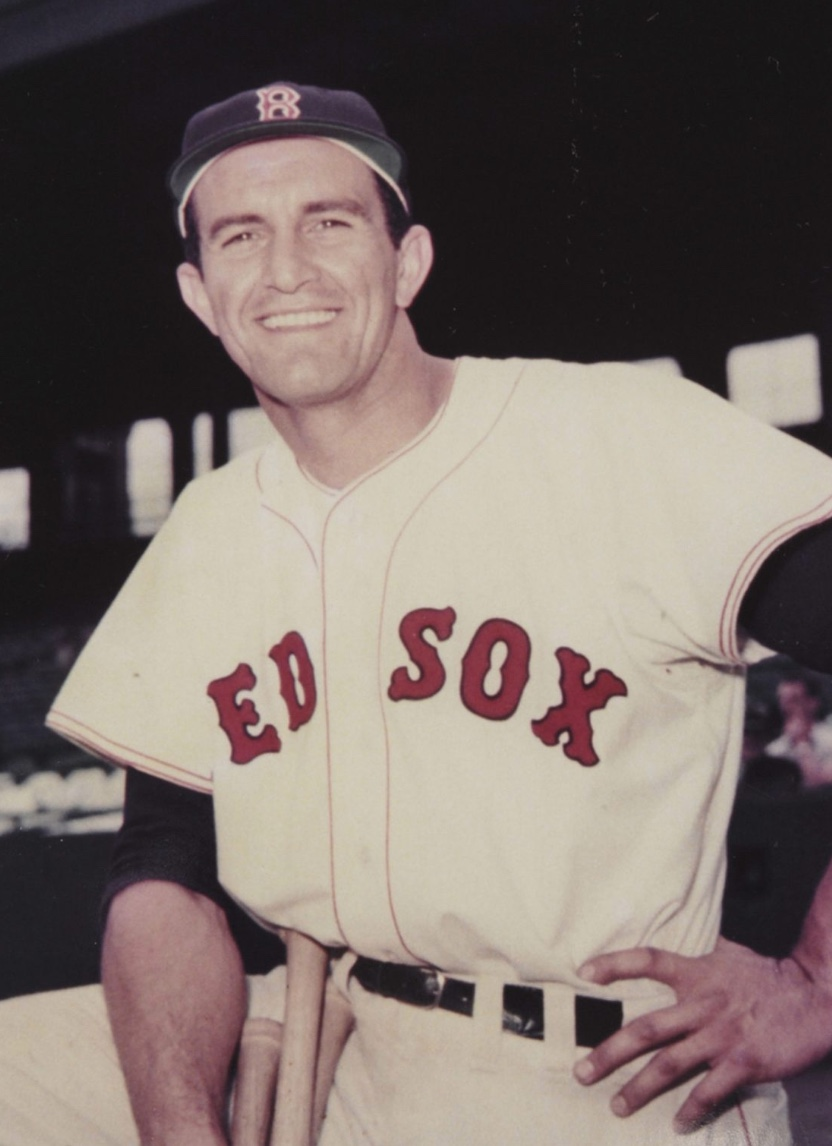
Harry Agganis

- June 2 – Harry Eccles, 61, pitcher who played for the Philadelphia Athletics during the 1915 season.
- June 6 – Mike Kelley, 79, first baseman for the 1899 Louisville Colonels; later a longtime minor league manager (notably with St. Paul and Minneapolis) and club owner (Minneapolis).
- June 16 – Mike Morrison, 88, pitcher who played for the Cleveland Spiders, Syracuse Stars and Baltimore Orioles in part of three seasons between 1887 and 1890.
- June 18 – Jack Katoll, 82, German pitcher who played for the Chicago Orphans, Chicago White Sox and Baltimore Orioles in a span of four seasons from 1898 to 1902.
- June 19 – Eli Juran, 52, left-handed first baseman-outfielder-pitcher who appeared for five different clubs in the Eastern Colored League and East–West League in 1926 and 1932.
- June 22 – Frankie Hayes, 40, five-time All-Star catcher who played for the Philadelphia Athletics, St. Louis Browns, Cleveland Indians, Chicago White Sox and Boston Red Sox for 14 seasons spanning 1933 to 1947; a workhorse who caught 312 consecutive games between October 1943 and April 1946, a Major League record, including catching all 155 Athletics games in 1944, setting a still-standing American League season record; led AL three times in total chances per game, twice each in fielding average, putouts, double plays and errors, and once in assists; his 29 double plays in 1945 is the second-highest total ever for a catcher.
- June 27 – Harry Agganis, 26, Boston Red Sox first baseman who appeared in 157 games between April 13, 1954 and June 2, 1955, when he was sidelined by illness; former local schoolboy (Lynn Classical High School) and college (Boston University) football star, nicknamed "The Golden Greek", who compiled outstanding records as a quarterback and became first person in BU history to receive All-American honors.
- June 29 – Horace Milan, 61, outfielder who played in 42 games with the Washington Senators in 1915 and 1917; brother of speedster Clyde Milan.

=== July ===
- July 12
  - Dan McGeehan, 70, second baseman who played three games for the St. Louis Cardinals in April 1911.
  - Jesse Stovall, 79, pitcher who hurled in 28 games for the 1903 Cleveland Naps and 1904 Detroit Tigers; also played six games as a first baseman and pinch hitter.
  - Harry Taylor, 89, 19th-century first baseman and outfielder who played 438 games for the 1890–1892 Louisville Colonels and 1893 Baltimore Orioles.
- July 20 – Joe Shannon, 58, who appeared in five contests as a pinch hitter, outfielder and first baseman for the 1915 Boston Braves at the age of 18.
- July 22 – Lafayette Henion, 56, pitcher who made one appearance in MLB when he threw three innings of relief for the Brooklyn Robins on September 10, 1919.
- July 28
  - Rudy Baerwald (also known as Rudy Bell and Jack Bell), 74, outfielder in 18 games for 1907 New York Highlanders.
  - Dell Clark, 64, second baseman for the 1921 St. Louis Giants of the Negro National League.
- July 30 – Dave Rowan, 73, Canadian first baseman who appeared in 18 contests for the St. Louis Browns between May 27 and June 22, 1911.

=== August ===
- August 2 – Peaches O'Neill, 75, Notre Dame graduate who appeared in eight contests as a catcher, first baseman and pinch hitter for the 1905 Cincinnati Reds.
- August 3 – Mule Shirley, 54, first baseman who played 44 games for pennant-winning 1924 and 1925 Washington Senators; played in three games as pinch hitter or pinch runner in the 1924 World Series for champion Senators.
- August 4 – Mike Balenti, 69, shortstop-outfielder who appeared in 78 total games for 1911 Cincinnati Reds and 1913 St. Louis Browns; a Native American (Cheyenne) who attended Carlisle Indian School.
- August 5
  - Norm Glockson, 61, catcher and pinch hitter who received a seven-game trial with Cincinnati late in the 1914 season.
  - Wilbur Pritchett, 58, pitcher who hurled for five clubs over eight seasons in Black baseball between 1924 and 1932.
- August 6 – Hooks Cotter, 55, first baseman for 1922 and 1924 Chicago Cubs, appearing in 99 career games
- August 11
  - Jerry Byrne, 48, pitcher in three games for the 1929 Chicago White Sox.
  - Babe Ellison, 56, infielder-outfielder in 135 games for the 1916–1920 Detroit Tigers; enjoyed brilliant minor-league career with San Francisco Seals from 1921 to 1927, where in 1924 he compiled 307 hits in 201 Pacific Coast League games, seventh-most in history; member of PCL Hall of Fame.
- August 23 – Eugene Redd, 55, third baseman-shortstop for the Cleveland Tate Stars and Milwaukee Bears of the Negro National League in 1922–1923.
- August 24 – John Raleigh, 68, southpaw who went 1–10 (4.10 ERA) in 18 games for the 1909–1910 St. Louis Cardinals.
- August 25 – Jimmy Hudgens, 53, pinch hitter/first baseman who played in 26 career games for the 1923 St. Louis Cardinals and 1925–1926 Cincinnati Reds.
- August 26 – Sol White, 87, pioneer player, manager and executive of the Negro leagues (1887 to 1926) and member of the National Baseball Hall of Fame (elected 2006); piloted Philadelphia Giants to four consecutive championships (1904–1907) and in the latter year wrote the first history of Black baseball.

=== September ===
- September 1 – Jim Oglesby, 50, first baseman and minor-league veteran who appeared in three games at age 30 for the 1936 Philadelphia Athletics.
- September 3 – Hal Schwenk, 65, southpaw who, in his only MLB game, pitched his St. Louis Browns to an 11-inning, 5–4 complete game victory on September 4, 1913.
- September 4 – Gus Weyhing, 88, fire-balling 145 lb (66 kg) hurler who won 264 games (losing 232) for 11 teams in four major leagues (National, American, Players', and the American Association) between 1887 and 1901, and set the all-time record for hit batsmen (277); won 30 or more games for four consecutive seasons (1889–1892), and 20 or more games on three other occasions; also lost 19 or more games eight times.
- September 8 – Dode Criss, 70, good-hitting pitcher turned pinch hitter and first baseman who played in 227 games for 1908–1911 St. Louis Browns; batted .276 lifetime with 84 hits and posted 3–9 record (4.38 ERA) in 30 mound appearances.
- September 10 – Shano Collins, 69, outfielder/first baseman who appeared in 1,799 games for the Chicago White Sox (1910–1920) and Boston Red Sox (1921–1925); member of 1917 World Series champions; manager of Red Sox, 1931 to June 18, 1932.
- September 12 – Dick Adkins, 35, shortstop who played three games for the Philadelphia Athletics in September 1942.
- September 16
  - George Brown, 69, outfielder for Dayton, Columbus and Detroit of the Negro National League in 1920 and 1921; prior to that, played extensively for independent Black baseball clubs during the 1910s.
  - Dan Sherman, 64, pitcher who faced four batters (and registered one out) in his only appearance for Chicago of the Federal League on September 4, 1914.
- September 20 – Art Herman, 84, pitcher who appeared in 17 games for Louisville of the National League in 1896 and 1897.
- September 22 – Louis Drucke, 66, New York Giants' pitcher who worked in 53 games between 1909 and 1912; member of 1911 NL champions.
- September 23
  - McKinley Brewer, 59, pitcher-outfielder-first baseman for the 1921 Chicago Giants of the Negro National League.
  - Gary Fortune, 60, pitcher who went 0–5 lifetime (6.61 ERA) in 20 games for the Philadelphia Phillies (1916, 1918) and Boston Red Sox (1920).
- September 27 – Fred Walden, 65, catcher who played in one game, caught one inning, and made one error, in his one MLB game on June 3, 1912, as a member of the St. Louis Browns.

=== October ===
- October 4 – Stan Baumgartner, 60, relief pitcher who spent eight seasons in the majors with both of Philadelphia's MLB teams, the Phillies and Athletics, between 1914 and 1926, then became a prominent baseball writer in that city.
- October 5 – Lyman Lamb, 60, third baseman for the St. Louis Browns during two seasons from 1920 to 1921.
- October 9
  - Howie Fox, 34, pitcher for the Cincinnati Reds, Philadelphia Phillies and Baltimore Orioles from 1944 to 1954.
  - Jim Jackson, 77, utility outfielder who played for the Baltimore Orioles, New York Giants and Cleveland Naps over four seasons from 1901 to 1906.
- October 13 – Fred Lear, 61, third baseman who played for the Philadelphia Athletics, Chicago Cubs and New York Giants in part of four seasons between 1915 and 1920.
- October 18
  - George Murray, 57, who pitched from 1922 to 1933 for the New York Yankees, Boston Red Sox, Washington Senators and Chicago White Sox.
  - Charlie Shields, 32, pitcher who played for the Chicago American Giants, New York Cubans and Homestead Grays of the Negro leagues between 1941 and 1943.
- October 26 – Jack Bushelman, 70, pitcher who played with the Cincinnati Reds in the 1909 season and for the Boston Red Sox from 1911 to 1912.
- October 27 – Clark Griffith, 85, Hall of Fame pitcher and manager, and principal owner of the Washington Senators since 1920; won 237 games in 20-year career in three major leagues between 1891 and 1914, with 20 or more victories in seven different campaigns; led National League in earned run average (1.88) in 1898, then was a key recruiter of NL players to upstart American League in 1901; managed Chicago White Stockings, New York Highlanders, Cincinnati Reds and Senators between 1901 and 1920; his 1901 White Stockings won the pennant in the AL's inaugural season.

=== November ===
- November 3 – John Merritt, 61, backup outfielder who appeared in just one game with the New York Giants in the 1913 season.
- November 4 – Cy Young, 88, Hall of Fame pitcher who won a record 511 games over a 22-year career with five clubs from 1890 to 1911, being a 30-game winner five seasons, a 20-game victor sixteen times, pitching a perfect game, two no-hitters, and while being a member of the 1903 Boston Americans hurling the first pitch in a World Series game.
- November 5
  - Frank Gregory, 67, pitcher for the Cincinnati Reds in their 1912 season.
  - Bert Wilson, 44, Chicago-based sportscaster who was the radio voice of the Cubs from 1943 to 1955.
- November 12 – Sam Crane, 61, shortstop who played for the Philadelphia Athletics, Washington Senators, Cincinnati Reds and Brooklyn Robins in part of seven seasons spanning 1914–1922.
- November 15 – Calvin Clarke, 39, outfielder, second baseman and pitcher who appeared for the 1938 Washington Black Senators and 1941 Newark Eagles of the Negro National League.
- November 19 – Otto Jacobs, 66, catcher for the 1918 Chicago White Sox.
- November 23 – Fred Tauby, 49, part-time outfielder who played with the Chicago White Sox in the 1935 season and for the Philadelphia Phillies in 1937.
- November 30 – John Stone, 50, outfielder for the Detroit Tigers and Washington Senators from 1928 to 1938, who hit over .300 in seven of his eleven seasons, with a career-high .341 in 1936.

=== December ===
- December 6 – Honus Wagner, 81, legendary Hall of Fame shortstop of the Pittsburgh Pirates who won eight National League batting crowns and led the league in runs batted in, stolen bases, doubles and slugging average at least five times each in a 21-year career, posting an overall batting line of .328/.391/.467, having scored 1,739 runs, connect 3,420 hits and stolen 723 bases.
- December 8 – Buck Washer, 73, pitcher for the Philadelphia Phillies during the 1905 season.
- December 9 – Curt Walker, 59, right fielder who played twelve seasons from 1919 to 1930 for the Philadelphia Phillies, New York Yankees, Cincinnati Reds and New York Giants, compiling a slash line of.304/.374/.440 and 1,475 hits in 1,359 games, while batting a .300 or better average in seven seasons.
- December 17 – Rube DeGroff, 76, backup outfielder for the St. Louis Cardinals during two seasons from 1905 to 1906.
- December 18 – George Caster, 48, pitcher who played for the Philadelphia Athletics, St. Louis Browns and Detroit Tigers during twelve seasons from 1934 to 1946, as well as a member of the 1945 World Champion Tigers.
- December 18 – Francisco José Cróquer, 35, Venezuelan sportscaster specialized in baseball and boxing, who achieved international renown and became a household name in Latino communities after joining the Gillette Cavalcade of Sports in the late 1940s.
- December 19 – Moxie Divis, 61, outfielder who played for the Philadelphia Athletics during the 1916 season.
- December 22 – Jimmy O'Rourke, 71, outfielder who played in 1908 with the New York Highlanders.
- December 23 – Joe McManus, 68, who pitched in 1913 for the Cincinnati Reds.
- December 24 – Jake Boultes, 71, who played from 1907 through 1909 for the Boston Doves, mostly as a pitcher, although he also played a handful of games as a shortstop and third baseman.
- December 27
  - William "Lord" Byron, 83, National League umpire from 1913 to 1919, officiating 1,012 games and the 1914 World Series.
  - Jim Fairbank, 74, pitcher who played for the Philadelphia Athletics during the 1903 and 1904 seasons.
- December 31 – Clint Brown, 52, relief pitcher for the Cleveland Indians and Chicago White Sox in a span of fifteen seasons from 1928 to 1942, who posted a career 89–93 W-L record with 64 saves and 4.26 ERA, leading the American League relievers in 1939 in appearances (61), games finished (56), saves (18) and innings (1181/3), ending 11th in the voting for the American League MVP Award.
