= Robert Clark =

Robert, Bob, or Bobby Clark may refer to:

== Television and film ==
- Robert Clark (actor) (born 1987), American-born Canadian television actor
- Bob Clark (1939–2007), Canadian filmmaker
- Bob Clark (television reporter) (1922–2015), American television reporter for the ABC network
- Bobby Clark (stunt performer) (* 1937), American stunt performer and actor
- Bobby Clark (juvenile actor) (1944–2021), American film and television actor
- Bobby Clark (comedy actor) (1888–1960), vaudevillian, performed on stage, films, television, & the circus
- Robert Clark (film executive) (1905–1984), Scottish film executive

== Literature ==
- Robert Clark (author) (born 1952), American novelist
- Robert Clark (poet), see 1911 in poetry
- Robert Clark (academic), co-founded The Literary Encyclopedia

== Sports ==
=== Association football (soccer) ===
- Robert Clark (footballer, born 1903) (1903–1970), English footballer for Liverpool F.C.
- Bobby Clark (footballer, born 1945), Scottish footballer
- Robert Clark (footballer, born 1962), Scottish association football player
- Bobby Clark (footballer, born 2005), English footballer
- Robbie Clark (born 1991), English footballer

=== Baseball ===
- Bob Clark (catcher) (1863–1919), American baseball player
- Dell Clark (Robert Wardell Clark, 1891–1955), American baseball player
- Bob Clark (pitcher) (1897–1944), American baseball pitcher
- Bobby Clark (outfielder) (born 1955), American baseball outfielder

=== Other sports ===
- Bob Clark (athlete) (1913–1976), American Olympic silver medalist in decathlon, 1936
- Robert Clark (wrestler) (1939–2013), Australian Olympic wrestler
- Bobby Clark (Australian footballer) (born 1940), Australian rules footballer
- Bobby Clark (rugby union) (born 1944), Scotland international rugby union player
- Robert Clark (gridiron football) (born 1965), American football player

== Politics ==
- Robert Clark (Australian politician) (born 1957), member of the Victorian Legislative Assembly
- Robert Clark (mayor), mayor of Lancaster, Pennsylvania, 1890–1894
- Robert Clark (New York politician) (1777–1837), member of Congress from New York
- Robert Curtis Clark (1937–2020), Canadian provincial level politician
- Robert G. Clark Jr. (1928–2025), American politician from Mississippi
- Robert L. Clark (1872–?), member of the Wisconsin State Assembly

== Science ==
- Robert Clark (physicist), Australian chief defence scientist and academic; involved in development of Kane quantum computer
- Robert Clark (zoologist) (1882–1950), zoologist, biologist and crew member of Shackleton's Imperial Trans-Antarctic Expedition

== Education ==
- Robert C. Clark (born 1944), former dean of Harvard Law School
- Robert D. Clark (1910–2005), American university administrator
- Robert E. Clark II, president of Wesley College, Dover, Delaware

== Others ==
- Robert Clark (businessman) (1924–2013), British naval officer and businessman
- Robert Clark (exonerated convict), exonerated with help of the Georgia Innocence Project after 24 years in prison
- Robert Clark (missionary) (1825–1900), British Church Missionary Society missionary
- Robert Clark (naval architect), British yacht designer, designed British Steel
- Robert Clark (photographer) (born c. 1961), American photographer
- Bobby Clark (tenor) (?–2014), original member of the Southern Gospel Cathedral Quartet
- Bob Clark (businessman) (born 1959), American businessman
- Robert Peter Clark, a pseudonym of murderer John List
- Robert Sterling Clark (1877–1956), American art collector, horse breeder and philanthropist
- Robert T. Clark, retired U.S. Army general, commanded U.S. Fifth Army 2003–2006
- Robert Indiana (1928–2018), American artist born Robert Clark
- Robert Clark (priest) (1907–1998), dean of Edinburgh
- Robert Clark (archivist), American archivist
- Robert F. Clark (1838–1912), American banker, political figure, and sportsman
- Robert Lindsey Clark (1864–1925), English sculptor

== See also ==
- Bert Clark (disambiguation)
- Robert Clarke (disambiguation)
- Robert Clerk (disambiguation)
- Clark (surname)
