= 2010–11 Doncaster Rovers F.C. season =

Doncaster Rovers
2010–11 season
- Chairman: John Ryan
- Manager: Sean O'Driscoll
- Championship: 21st
- FA Cup: Third round
- League Cup: First round
- Top goalscorer: League: Billy Sharp; James Coppinger (6 each); All: Billy Sharp; James Coppinger (6 each)
- Highest home attendance: 13,293 vs Leeds United (17 Sep 2010)
- Lowest home attendance: 4,603 vs Accrington Stanley (10 Aug 2010)
- Average home league attendance: 10,258
Home colours	Away colours

The 2010–11 season marked the 131st season in Doncaster Rovers Football Club's existence, and their third consecutive year in the Championship, the second tier of English football. The team finished the season with 11 wins, 15 draws, and 20 losses, for a total of 48 points, only good enough for 21st in the league, avoiding relegation by 6 points. Forward Billy Sharp led the team with 16 goals scored in 31 appearances, while midfielder John Oster had 43 total appearances for the team, leading all players. The team started the season winning three of their first six league matches, and generally alternated wins and losses or draws throughout the season, but ended the year losing six of their last seven matches. In the FA Cup competition, they played the Wolverhampton Wanderers to a 2-2 draw in the first match at home but lost the replay 6-0 at Molineux Stadium. In the League Cup, they lost in the first round to Accrington Stanley 2-1 after extra time.

== Players ==
=== First team ===
Players' ages are as of the opening day of the 2010–11 season.

No.	Name	Nationality	Position	Date of birth (age)	Signed from	Notes
Goalkeepers
1	Neil Sullivan	(Scotland)	GK	24 February 1970 (aged 40)	Leeds United	First team goalkeeper
33	Gary Woods	(England)	GK	1 October 1990 (aged 19)	Manchester United	
Defenders
2	James O'Connor	(England)	RB	20 November 1984 (aged 25)	Bournemouth	
6	James Chambers	(England)	RB	20 November 1980 (aged 29)	Leicester City	
24	Mustapha Dumbuya	(England)	RB	3 February 1988 (aged 22)	Grays Athletic	
11	Adam Lockwood	(England)	CB	26 October 1981 (aged 28)	Yeovil Town	Vice captain
4	Shelton Martis	(Netherlands Antilles)	CB	29 November 1982 (aged 27)	West Bromwich Albion	
23	Byron Webster	(England)	CB	31 March 1987 (aged 23)	FK SIAD Most	
21	Sam Hird	(England)	CB	7 September 1987 (aged 22)	Leeds United	
5	Wayne Thomas	(England)	CB	17 May 1979 (aged 31)	Southampton	
3	George Friend	(England)	LB	19 October 1987 (aged 22)	Wolverhampton Wanderers	
Midfielders
15	Mark Wilson	(England)	DM	9 February 1979 (aged 31)	FC Dallas	
22	Dean Shiels	(England)	RW	1 February 1985 (aged 25)	Hibernian	
26	James Coppinger	(England)	RW	18 January 1981 (aged 29)	Exeter City	
8	Brian Stock	(Wales)	CM	24 December 1981 (aged 28)	Preston North End	Captain
7	Martin Woods	(Scotland)	LM	1 January 1986 (aged 24)	Rotherham United	
18	Simon Gillett	(England)	CM	6 November 1985 (aged 24)	Southampton	
14	Josh Payne	(England)	MC	25 November 1990 (aged 19)	West Ham United	
34	Robbie Clark	(England)	CM	30 April 1991 (aged 19)	Youth academy	Reserve team player
16	John Oster	(Wales)	RW	8 December 1978 (aged 31)	Crystal Palace	
Strikers
9	Steve Brooker	(England)	ST	21 May 1981 (aged 29)	Bristol City	
10	Billy Sharp	(England)	ST	5 February 1986 (aged 24)	Sheffield United	
12	James Hayter	(England)	ST	9 April 1979 (aged 31)	Bournemouth	
29	Waide Fairhurst	(England)	ST	7 May 1989 (aged 21)	Youth academy	Reserve team player
36	Bradley Grayson	(England)	ST	12 April 1992 (aged 18)	Youth academy	Reserve team player

==== Squad statistics ====
As of 31 June 2011

No.	Pos	Nat	Player	Total		Championship		FA Cup		League Cup	
No.	Pos	Nat	Player	Apps	Goals	Apps	Goals	Apps	Goals	Apps	Goals
1	GK	(Scotland) SCO	Neil Sullivan	34	0	30+1	0	2	0	1	0
2	DF	(England) ENG	James O'Connor	37	2	34	2	2	0	1	0
3	DF	(England) ENG	George Friend	35	1	30+2	1	0+2	0	1	0
4	MF	(Netherlands Antilles) ANT	Shelton Martis	27	1	24+2	1	0	0	0+1	0
5	DF	(England) ENG	Wayne Thomas	21	0	17+4	0	0	0	0	0
6	DF	(England) ENG	James Chambers	9	0	6+1	0	2	0	0	0
7	MF	(England) ENG	Martin Woods	15	1	13+2	1	0	0	0	0
8	MF	(Wales) WAL	Brian Stock	37	2	31+6	2	0	0	0	0
9	FW	(England) ENG	Steve Brooker	16	1	1+12	1	0+2	0	1	0
10	FW	(England) ENG	Billy Sharp	31	16	27+2	15	2	1	0	0
11	DF	(England) ENG	Adam Lockwood	19	1	13+3	1	2	0	1	0
12	FW	(England) ENG	James Hayter	35	10	28+4	9	2	1	0+1	0
14	MF	(England) ENG	Josh Payne	1	1	0	0	0	0	1	1
14	MF	(Belgium) BEL	Franck Moussa	14	2	14	2	0	0	0	0
15	MF	(England) ENG	Mark Wilson	30	0	15+13	0	2	0	0	0
16	MF	(Wales) WAL	John Oster	43	0	41	0	2	0	0	0
17	MF	(England) ENG	Ryan Mason	15	0	5+10	0	0	0	0	0
18	MF	(England) ENG	Simon Gillett	22	1	21+1	1	0	0	0	0
19	FW	(Jamaica) JAM	Jason Euell	12	3	7+5	3	0	0	0	0
19	FW	(Northern Ireland) NIR	David Healy	8	2	6+2	2	0	0	0	0
20	DF	(England) ENG	Joseph Mills	19	2	17+1	2	1	0	0	0
21	DF	(England) ENG	Sam Hird	35	0	20+12	0	2	0	1	0
22	MF	(Northern Ireland) NIR	Dean Shiels	35	3	15+18	3	1	0	1	0
23	DF	(England) ENG	Byron Webster	7	0	1+6	0	0	0	0	0
24	DF	(Sierra Leone) SLE	Mustapha Dumbuya	24	0	17+6	0	0	0	1	0
25	DF	(Brazil) BRA	Dennis Souza	9	0	3+5	0	0+1	0	0	0
26	MF	(England) ENG	James Coppinger	42	7	38+2	7	2	0	0	0
27	DF	(England) ENG	Matthew Kilgallon	12	0	7+5	0	0	0	0	0
29	FW	(England) ENG	Waide Fairhurst	3	0	0+2	0	0	0	1	0
30	MF	(Ireland) EIR	Paul Keegan	10	0	9+1	0	0	0	0	0
32	MF	(England) ENG	Ryan Burge	1	0	0+1	0	0	0	0	0
33	GK	(England) ENG	Gary Woods	16	0	16	0	0	0	0	0
34	MF	(England) ENG	Robert Clark	1	0	0	0	0	0	1	0
35		(England) ENG	Brett Lucas	0	0	0	0	0	0	0	0
36	FW	(England) ENG	Bradley Grayson	1	0	0	0	0	0	0+1	0
37		(England) ENG	Aaron Jones	0	0	0	0	0	0	0	0
38		(England) ENG	Robert Oldham	0	0	0	0	0	0	0	0

== Results ==
=== Championship ===
Championship match details
Date	Time	Opponent	Venue	Result	Score F–A	Scorers	Attendance	Ref.
7 August 2010	15:00	Preston North End	Away	W	2–0	O'Connor 12', Hayter 18'	12,190	
14 August 2010	15:00	Bristol City	Home	D	1–1	Sharp 90' pen.	9,291	
21 August 2010	15:00	Cardiff City	Away	L	0–4		24,027	
28 August 2010	15:00	Hull City	Home	W	3–1	Woods 2', Sharp 44' pen., Coppinger 69'	11,149	
11 September 2010	15:00	Watford	Away	D	2–2	Gillett 23', Friend 90'	15,101	
14 September 2010	19:45	Norwich City	Home	W	3–1	Coppinger 14', 50', 86'	9,314	
17 September 2010	19:45	Leeds United	Home	D	0–0		13,293	
25 September 2010	15:00	Queens Park Rangers	Away	L	0–3		13,990	
28 September 2010	15:00	Coventry City	Away	L	1–2	Sharp 43'	12,292	
2 October 2010	15:00	Nottingham Forest	Home	D	1–1	Lockwood 33'	10,759	
16 October 2010	15:00	Scunthorpe United	Away	W	3–1	Sharp 31', 59' pen., O'Connor 72'	7,005	
19 October 2010	19:45	Derby County	Home	L	2–3	Shiels 66', 68'	9,000	
23 October 2010	15:00	Sheffield United	Home	W	2–0	Coppinger 33', Sharp 42'	8,985	
30 October 2010	15:00	Reading	Away	L	3–4	Hayter 26', Martis 42', Shiels 50'	15,553	
6 November 2010	15:00	Millwall	Home	W	2–1	Hayter 56', Healy 58'	10,356	
9 November 2010	19:45	Burnley	Away	D	1–1	Hayter 13'	13,655	
13 November 2010	15:00	Portsmouth	Away	W	3–2	Hayter 15', Coppinger 26', Healy 79'	14,828	
20 November 2010	15:00	Swansea City	Home	D	1–1	Hayter 16'	13,614	
27 November 2010	15:00	Crystal Palace	Away	L	0–1		12,470	
11 December 2010	15:00	Leicester City	Away	L	1–5	Sharp 6'	27,549	
17 December 2010	19:45	Middlesbrough	Home	W	2–1	Hayter 22', Stock 90'	9,543	
1 January 2011	15:00	Scunthorpe United	Home	W	3–0	Sharp 26', Hayter 38', Mills 45'	9,447	
3 January 2011	15:00	Sheffield United	Away	D	2–2	Sharp 66', 74' pen.	21,102	
15 January 2011	15:00	Reading	Home	L	0–3		9,496	
22 January 2011	15:00	Ipswich Town	Away	L	2–3	Sharp 6', 61'	17,298	
25 January 2011	19:45	Barnsley	Home	L	0–2		10,740	
1 February 2011	19:45	Burnley	Home	W	1–0	Duff 59' o.g.	8,893	
5 February 2011	15:00	Millwall	Away	L	0–1		11,427	
12 February 2011	15:00	Portsmouth	Home	L	0–2		10,288	
15 February 2011	19:45	Ipswich Town	Home	L	0–6		8,448	
19 February 2011	15:00	Swansea City	Away	L	0–3		13,309	
22 February 2011	19:45	Norwich City	Away	D	1–1	Drury 83' o.g.	25,529	
26 February 2011	15:00	Watford	Home	D	1–1	Euell 45+1'	8,954	
1 March 2011	19:45	Derby County	Away	W	3–1	Sharp 41', 48', Mills 71'	24,239	
5 March 2011	15:00	Leeds United	Away	L	2–5	Sharp 45+2', Moussa 49'	27,027	
8 March 2011	19:45	Coventry City	Home	D	1–1	Hayter 88'	7,921	
12 March 2011	15:00	Nottingham Forest	Away	D	0–0		25,442	
19 March 2011	15:00	Queens Park Rangers	Home	L	0–1		11,747	
2 April 2011	15:00	Bristol City	Away	L	0–1		13,726	
9 April 2011	15:00	Cardiff City	Home	L	1–3	Coppinger 78'	9,174	
12 April 2011	19:45	Preston North End	Home	D	1–1	Stock 77'	9,456	
16 April 2011	15:00	Hull City	Away	L	1–3	Moussa 16'	21,395	
22 April 2011	15:00	Crystal Palace	Home	D	0–0		14,312	
25 April 2011	15:00	Barnsley	Away	D	2–2	Euell 59', 73'	12,418	
30 April 2011	15:00	Leicester City	Home	D	1–1	Brooker 50'	11,757	
7 May 2011	12:45	Middlesbrough	Away	L	0–3		19,978	

=== FA Cup ===
FA Cup match details
Round	Date	Time	Opponents	Venue	Result	Score F–A	Scorers	Attendance	Ref.
Third round	8 January 2011	15:00	Wolverhampton Wanderers	Home	D	2–2	Sharp 41', Hayter 43'	8,616	
Third round replay	18 January 2011	19:45	Wolverhampton Wanderers	Away	L	0–5		10,031	

=== League Cup ===
League Cup match details
Round	Date	Time	Opponents	Venue	Result	Score F–A	Scorers	Attendance	Ref.
First round	10 August 2010	19:45	Accrington Stanley	Home	L	1–2 (a.e.t.)	Payne 57'	4,603	

== Team kit ==
Doncaster Rovers were sponsored by Nike, after their deal with previous sponsor Vandanal expired. Their shirt sponsor changed to One Call Insurance who previously sponsored the club during their days in the Football Conference.

== Transfers ==
=== In ===
First team

No.	Pos.	Nat.	Name	Age	EU	Moving from	Type	Transfer window	Ends	Transfer fee	Source
3	LB	(England)	Friend	21	EU	Wolverhampton Wanderers (England)	Transfer	Summer	2012	Free	
10	FW	(England)	Sharp	24	EU	Sheffield United	Transfer	Summer	2013	£1.15M	
18	CM	(England)	Gillett	24	EU	Southampton	Transfer	Summer	2013	Free	
14	CM	(England)	Payne	19	EU	West Ham United	Transfer	Summer	2010	Free	
5	CB	(England)	Thomas	30	EU	Southampton	Transfer	Summer	2011	Free	

Last updated: 8 May

Reserves and academy

No.	Pos.	Nat.	Name	Age	EU	Moving from	Type	Transfer window	Ends	Transfer fee	Source

Last updated: 8 May

Total spending: ▼£1.15 million

=== Out ===
First team

No.	Pos.	Nat.	Name	Age	EU	Moving to	Type	Transfer window	Transfer fee	Source
7	FW	(England)	Guy	24	EU	MK Dons	Contract expired	Summer	Free	
14	FW	(Republic of Ireland)	Heffernan	28	EU	Sheffield Wednesday	Contract expired	Summer	Free	
3	LB	(England)	Roberts	32	EU	Derby County	Contract expired	Summer	Free	
18	LB	(Scotland)	McDaid	23	EU	Carlisle United	Contract expired	Summer	Free	
10	CM	(England)	Spicer	26	EU	Notts County	Contract expired	Summer	Free	
13	GK	(England)	Smith	23	EU	Shrewsbury Town	Contract expired	Summer	Free	
14	CM	(England)	Payne	20	EU	Oxford United	Contract expired	Winter	Free	

Last updated: 7 July

Reserves and academy

No.	Pos.	Nat.	Name	Age	EU	Moving to	Type	Transfer window	Transfer fee	Source
35	DF	(England)	Fisher	18	EU	Released	Contract expired	Summer	Free	

Last updated: 7 July

Total income: ▲£0 million

=== Loaned in ===
#	Pos	Player	From	Start	End
17	AMC	Ryan Mason	Tottenham Hotspur	13 August 2010	Present
20	LB	Joseph Mills	Southampton	19 October 2010	Present
19	FW	David Healy	Sunderland	4 November 2010	Present
	CB	Matthew Kilgallon	Sunderland	9 January 2011	Present

=== Loaned out ===
#	Pos	Player	To	Start	End
14	MC	Josh Payne	Oxford	1 September 2010	31 December 2010
35	MC	Robbie Clark	Sheffield F.C.	9 October 2010	Present
