= Alan Clark (disambiguation) =

Alan Clark (1928–1999) was a British politician.

Alan, Allan, or Allen Clark may also refer to:

- Alan Clark (bishop) (1919–2002), Bishop of East Anglia
- Alan Clark (keyboardist) (born 1952), British keyboardist with Dire Straits
- Alan M. Clark (born 1957), American author and illustrator
- Alan Clark (television executive) (born 1949), Canadian television executive
- Alan Clark (businessman) (born 1959), South African businessman
- Alan Clark (Arkansas politician) (born 1960), member of the Arkansas State Senate
- Allan Clark (born 1957), American football running back for several NFL teams
- Allen George Clark (1898–1962), American-born British industrialist
- Allan Clark (rugby league) (1881–1935), Australian rugby league administrator

Alan, Allan, or Allen Clarke may also refer to:

- Alan Clarke (1935–1990), British film director
- Alan W. Clarke (born 1949), American academic
- Allen Clarke (educationalist) (1910–2007), British academic
- Allan Clarke (singer) (born 1942), English singer with The Hollies
- Allan Clarke (footballer) (born 1946), English international footballer for Leeds United
- Allan Clarke (rugby union) (1913–1975), English international rugby union player
- Alan Clarke (rugby league) (1907–1958), New Zealand rugby league player
- Allen Clarke (rugby union) (born 1967), Irish rugby union coach and former player
- C. Allen Clarke (1863–1935), English working-class writer
- Alan D. B. Clarke (1922–2011), British psychologist
- Alan Clarke (footballer, born 1962), Irish football midfielder

== See also ==
- Alan Clarke, the illustrator of the book series Demon Road
- Al Clark (disambiguation)
