= Albert Clark =

Albert Clark may refer to:

- Albert Clark (artist) (1843–1928), English painter
- Albert Clark (baseball) (1910–1988), American baseball player
- Albert C. Clark (1865–1929), Illinois state senator
- Albert Curtis Clark (1859–1937), English classical scholar
- Albert M. Clark (1879–1950), American Supreme Court justice from Missouri
- Albert O. Clark (1858–1935), American architect
- Albert P. Clark (1913–2010), American superintendent of the US Air Force Academy
- Albert Clarke (1916–1944), English footballer

== See also ==
- Bert Clark (disambiguation)
- Al Clark (disambiguation)
- Bertie Clarke (1918–1993), West Indian cricketer
