= Bert Clark (disambiguation) =

Bert Clark was an American football coach.

Bert Clark(e) may also refer to:

- Bert Clark (motorcyclist) in 1969 Grand Prix motorcycle racing season
- Bert Clarke (footballer, born 1906), former North Melbourne
- Bert Clarke, footballer

== See also ==
- Albert Clark (disambiguation)
- Robert Clark (disambiguation)
- Hubert Clark, zoologist
- Herbert Clark (disambiguation)
- Bertie Clark, see Strength athletics in the United Kingdom and Ireland
