= Robert Clarke (disambiguation) =

Robert Clarke (1920–2005) was an American actor.

Robert, Rob, Bob, Bobby, or Bobbie Clarke may also refer to:

== Arts and entertainment ==
- Bob Clarke (illustrator) (1926–2013), American illustrator for Mad magazine
- Bobbie Clarke (born Robert William Woodman, 1941–2014), English rock drummer
- Bob Carlos Clarke (1950–2006), Irish photographer
- Rob Clarke (musician), English musician

== Politics and law ==
- Sir Robert Clarke, 2nd Baronet (1683–1746), British politician and lawyer
- Rob Clarke (politician) (born 1967), Canadian politician and Royal Canadian Mounted Police officer
- Sir Robert Bowcher Clarke (1803–1881), Barbadian barrister, solicitor-general, and chief justice
- Robert M. Clarke (1836–1900), second Nevada Attorney General
- Robert M. Clarke (1879–1943, American lawyer and judge who served in California's 69th State Assembly district

== Sports ==
- Bob Clarke (baseball) (1903–1971), American Negro leagues baseball player
- Robert Clarke (cricketer) (1924–1981), English cricketer
- Bobby Clarke (footballer) (1941–2008), English footballer for Chester City and Witton Albion
- Bobby Clarke (born 1949), Canadian hockey player
- Robert Clarke (footballer) (born 1967), Liberian footballer

== Others ==
- Robert Clarke (priest) (1717–1782), Irish Anglican priest
- Robert Clarke (inventor) (1816–1882), English inventor of the pennywhistle and manufacturer of tin whistles
- Robert Clarke (architect) (1819–1877), architect in Nottingham
- Robert Charles Clarke (1843–1904), architect in Nottingham
- Robert L. Clarke (born 1942), Comptroller of the Currency of the United States
- Robert Connell Clarke (born 1953), ethnobotanist specialist in cannabis evolution
- Bob Clarke (historian) (born 1964), English archaeologist and historian
- Robert Clarke (academic), Irish oncology researcher

== Other uses ==
- Robert Clarke & Company, publisher and bookseller in Cincinnati, Ohio
- Bob Clarke Trophy, annual award given by Western Hockey League
- Bobby Clarke Trophy, annual award given by Philadelphia Flyers hockey team

== See also ==
- Robert Clark (disambiguation)
- Robert Clerk (disambiguation)
- Clarke (surname)
