= Robert Clerk (disambiguation) =

Robert Clerk (c. 1720–1797) was a British engineer officer who served in the War of the Austrian Succession and the Seven Years' War.

Robert Clerk may also refer to:

- Sir Robert Maxwell Clerk, 11th Baronet, of the Clerk baronets
- Robert Clerk (MP), in 1386, MP for Truro

== See also ==
- Clerk (disambiguation)
- Robert Clark (disambiguation)
- Robert Clarke (disambiguation)
