= Al Clark =

Al Clark may refer to:

- Al Clark (American football) (born 1948), American football player
- Al Clark (Blackwater), co-founder of Blackwater in 1997
- Al Clark (film editor) (1902–1971), nominated for the Academy Award for Best Film Editing five times
- Al Clark (producer), Australian film producer and actor
- Al Clark (umpire) (born 1948), former baseball umpire
- Al C. Clark; pseudonym of Donald Goines (1936–1974), American writer

== See also ==
- Albert Clark (disambiguation)
- Alan Clark (disambiguation)
