= Alan Clarke (footballer, born 1962) =

Irish former professional footballer

Personal information
- Date of birth: 3 February 1962 (age 64)
- Place of birth: Dublin, Ireland
- Position: Midfielder

Youth career
- 1979–1982: Leeds United

Senior career*
Years	Team	Apps	(Gls)
1982–1983	Borussia Lippstadt		
1983–1984	Hammer	10	(2)
1984–1989	Blau-Weiß 90	86	(8)
1989–1992	Tennis Borussia Berlin	66	(6)
1992–1994	SV Yeşilyurt		
- * Club domestic league appearances and goals

Alan Clarke (born 3 February 1962) is an Irish former professional footballer who played as a midfielder.

== Youth ==
Born in Dublin and growing up in the suburb of Lucan, Clarke was on the books of famed academy side Home Farm as a boy. A teammate in those childhood years was future Ireland international Ronnie Whelan. In 1979, both Clarke and Whelan left for England with the latter joining Liverpool and Clarke heading to Leeds United. After failing to make the grade at Leeds he left England for West Germany in 1982.

== Germany ==
His first contract in Germany was with Borussia Lippstadt, then playing in the Oberliga Westfalen, the third tier of German football and the highest tier in the region of Westphalia. After only a year in Lippstadt, Clarke signed for Hamm outfit Hammer SpVg, also in the Oberliga Westfalen.

In 1984 he signed for Blau-Weiss 90 Berlin, then of the German second-tier 2. Bundesliga. He would spend six years with Blau-Weiß winning promotion to the Bundesliga in the 1985-86 season. The stay in the top-flight was brief, with Blau-Weiß finishing in last-place and suffering relegation back to the second-tier.

Clarke remained with Berlin for another three seasons. In 1989 he was offered the chance to return to England to play with Blackburn Rovers but decided to stay in Germany, dropping a division to play for Tennis Borussia Berlin in the regional third tier. He helped them win the Oberliga Berlin in 1990-91 but lost out on promotion to 2.Bundesliga in the playoffs. He retired from professional football in 1992.

== Later years ==
After hanging up his boots Clarke stayed in Germany, playing local football, including for Berlin side SV Yeşilyurt. He is now a golfer, and is currently the club pro at Kallin Golf Club in Berlin.
