= Robert Clark (archivist) =

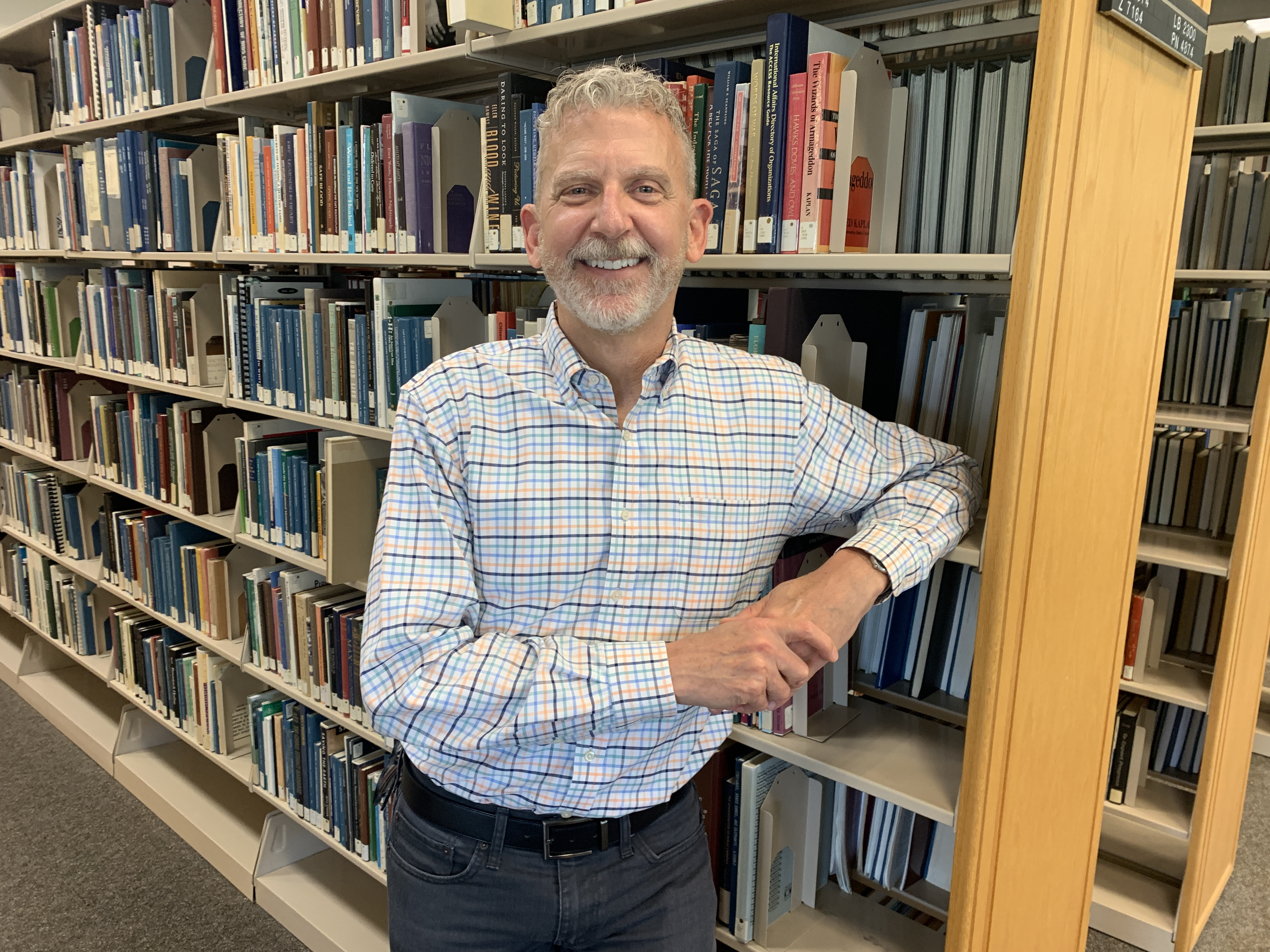
Robert Clark visiting IUPUI University Library.

Robert Clark is an American archivist with a background in history and law. He is currently the Director of Archives at the Rockefeller Archive Center in New York. His work in law and archives, as well as his support of the LGBTQ Community has made him well known in the archives profession as well as across the country. He is frequent guest speaker at events and conferences pertaining to history, archives and libraries. He is most well known for his work with the Franklin D. Roosevelt Presidential Library and Museum, where he served as archivist and Director for over ten years.

== Early life and education ==
Clark was born and raised in Denton, Texas. In 1985, he began his undergraduate education at Texas Tech University, where he received both his Bachelor's and Master's Degrees in History and Archival Administration. In 1991, he began work at Syracuse University College of Law, where he attended until 1994.

== Professional career ==
While a student at Texas Tech, Clark began working as an Student Assistant Archivist in the Southwest Collection. He remained throughout his undergraduate and graduate career, eventually promoted to Assistant Archivist and Field Representative.

From 1993 to 1996, Clark worked with a few law firms while he was studying law and in 1996, he became Vice President of the International Bank in Raton, New Mexico. In 1998, he became Senior Attorney for a law firm in Albuquerque before moving to New York in 2001.

Dissatisfied with law, he turned to archival work. In 2001, he began his long tenure at the Franklin D. Roosevelt Presidential Library and Museum. He began work as an archivist, eventually rising to Supervising Archivist in 2005 and later, Deputy Director. While he was Supervisory Archivist, the famous Barry Landau theft occurred which "rocked the archival world." This enhanced his interest in improving security both at the FDR Library as well as later at the Rockefeller Center.

While serving at the Roosevelt Library, Clark oversaw the care of over 17 million pages of manuscript materials, including the papers of FDR and Eleanor Roosevelt, printed materials and audio-visual and photographic collections.

In 2015, he began teaching as an adjunct professor at the University of Bridgeport, teaching an introductory course on the United Nations. Also in 2015, he took over as the Director of Archives at the Rockefeller Archive Center.

At the Rockefeller Center, he has led planning, management and development of the Center's collections.

== Affiliations ==
- Chair of the New York State Historical Records Advisory Board (SHRAB), which is a committee that advises the LGBT Center
- Member of the Planning & Advisory Committee for the Documentary Heritage and Preservation Services for New York (DHPSNY), which advises the New York State Archives, the Board of Regents, Commissioner of Education, New York State government, and the historical records community statewide
- Member of the Advisory Council on the Committee on Teaching About the United Nations
- Member of the Society of American Archivists and Representative on Joint Committee on Archives, Libraries and Museums
- Pro bono Archives Consultant for the Lesbian, Gay, Bisexual and Transgender Community Center
- Curatorial Committee Member for the Wilderstein Preservation and LGBT Center
- Advisory Committee Member for St. John's University in the Division of Information Science
- Member of the Advisory Committee of Historians for the Franklin D. Roosevelt Four Freedoms Park

== Publications ==
- "The National Archives Has Lost Its Archival Way", The Society for Historians of American Foreign Relations Review (Vol. 50, No.1), pp. 92–95. April 1, 2019
- "In Defense of Presidential Libraries: Why the Failure to Build an Obama Library Is Bad for Democracy", The Public Historian (Vol. 40, No. 2) May 1, 2018
- "Franklin D. Roosevelt Presidential Library and Museum, Hyde Park, New York", White House History: The Journal of the White House Historical Association (Winter 2016), No. 40, pp. 32–37.February 1, 2016
- "'Of Some Definite Historic Value': FDR and the Preservation of History", Dutchess County Historical Association Yearbook, Vol. 93, pp. 109–120.January 1, 2014
- "Available to Future Americans", New York Archives Magazine (Summer 2013), Vol. 13, No. 1, pp. 10–13.January 1, 2013
- “‘Rattlesnakes of the Atlantic’: FDR and the Freedom of the Seas", Landmarks in Atlantic Strategy: From Roosevelt to Obama, Luso-American Foundation, pp. 105–125.March 1, 2011
- “The Strange Case of the Tully Archive: How a Treasure Trove of Previously Unknown FDR Documents Came to the Roosevelt Library", National Archives Quarterly Prologue (Spring 2011), Vol. 43, no 1.January 1, 2011
- "FDR, Archivist", National Archives Quarterly Prologue (Winter 2006), Vol. 38, no. 4.January 1, 2006
- "Thomas A. Hickey: Texas Socialist and Oilman", West Texas Historical Association Yearbook, LXVI (1990), pp. 129–138.January 1, 1990 (This article was based on Clark's Master's Thesis, entitled "Thomas A. Hickey and Socialist Reform in Texas, 1904-1925", Texas Tech University, 1989.)
