= Albert Clark (artist) =

English painter

Albert Clark (October 1843–December 1928), was an English painter.

Born in October 1843, Clark was the second Son to acclaimed animal painter, James Clark and his wife, Elizabeth who died when Albert was a child.

Living with his father in a small town in Middlesex, South East England, Albert began to learn from James and started creating notable paintings of animals – namely horses – under the 19th century naïve style. At the age of 17, Albert Clark had defined himself as a ‘naïve animal artist’ and was first recorded under the profession on the 1861 census.

At the age of 24, Albert married Ellen Parsons and the couple went on to have 4 children together; one of which being Frederick Albert Clark who, like his predecessors, also went on to be an artist. In 1873 – 5 years after they married - during the birth of the couples 3rd and 4th children, Ellen died. In 1873, having been widowed for 2 years, Albert Clark remarried Harriet Jane Ireland and fathered a further 3 children which included the acclaimed animal artist, William Albert Clark. Once married, the couple moved to Islington allowing Albert to be closer to his father. After 23 years of marriage, Harriet died and Albert was once again a widow.

Although he produced many portraits of cattle and dogs throughout his career, Albert's speciality – like his father's – lied in the portraiture of horses. With these paintings being a well known amongst the Clark family, James produced a portrait entitled “The Runaway Horse” which he dedicated to Albert. Similarly, in later years, Albert reproduced his version of his father's painting under the new title “Breaking Loose” which he in turn dedicated to his son, William.

Having been recognised for his ability to paint racehorses, Albert Clark was regularly commissioned to paint such scenes – often with the jockey alongside his steed. Furthermore, with the annual Islington Horse Show held near the artist's London home, Albert regularly painted portraits of the show's prize winning animals.

At the age of 57, 40 years into his career as an animal artist, Albert Clark was reported deaf. Despite this impairment, the artist continued to paint animal portraits for many years. In December 1928, Albert Clark died age 85.
