= Calvin Clarke =

American baseball player

- Right fielder
- Born: February 14, 1916; Washington, D.C., U.S.
- Died: December 15, 1995 (aged 79); Washington, D.C., U.S.
- Batted: Right Threw: Right

Negro league baseball debut
- 1938, for the Washington Black Senators

Last appearance
- 1941, for the Newark Eagles
- Stats at Baseball Reference

Teams
- Washington Black Senators (1938); Newark Eagles (1941)

Calvin Valentine Clarke (February 14, 1916 – December 15, 1995) was an American professional baseball right fielder in the Negro leagues. He played with the Washington Black Senators in 1938 and the Newark Eagles in 1941.
