= Robert Clarke (academic) =

Northern Irish_American cancer researcher and academic administrator

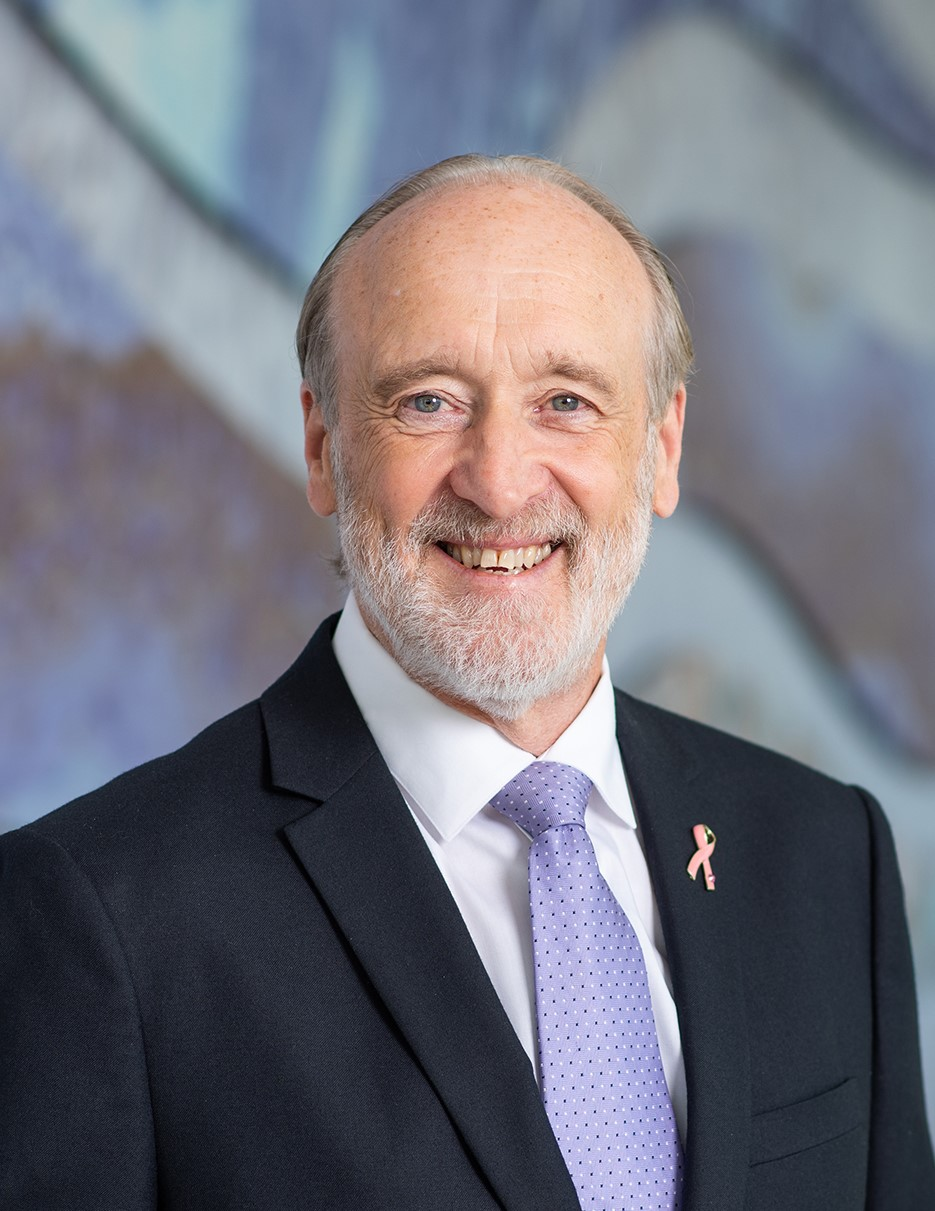
- Occupations: Cancer researcher and academic administrator
- Awards: Fellow, American Association for the Advancement of Science (USA); Fellow, Royal Society of Chemistry (UK); Fellow, Royal Society of Biology (UK); Fellow, Royal Society of Medicine (UK)

Academic background
- Education: BSc Biological Sciences; MSc Biochemistry; PhD Biochemistry
- Alma mater: Ulster University; Queen's University Belfast

Academic work
- Institutions: Hormel Institute, University of Minnesota; Georgetown University

Robert Clarke is a cancer researcher and academic administrator. He is the executive director of The Hormel Institute and a professor of biochemistry, molecular biology and biophysics at the University of Minnesota, and an adjunct professor of oncology at Georgetown University.

With his work focused on breast cancer research, Clarke studies how hormones (endogenous and exogenous) and related factors affect breast cancer. He has authored over 360 publications, and he has 5 patents awarded. His research focuses on understanding the endocrine responsiveness of breast cells and the likelihood that breast tumors will respond to specific systemic therapies. His laboratory also studies drug resistance and the role of cell-cell communication in affecting emergence from dormancy and responsiveness to endocrine therapies in breast tumors that express estrogen receptors.

Clarke is an elected fellow of American Association for the Advancement of Science, Royal Society of Chemistry, Royal Society of Medicine, and Royal Society of Biology. He serves on the editorial boards of several journals including Clinical Cancer Research (2006-date), Endocrine-Related Cancer (2012-date) and as associate editor (2001-2007), senior editor (2007-2023) and editorial board member (2023-date) for Cancer Research.

== Education ==
Clarke studied at Regent House School and received his bachelor's degree in biological sciences from the University of Ulster in 1980. He then enrolled at Queen's University of Belfast and earned a master's degree in 1982 and a PhD in 1986 (each in biochemistry). He completed his postdoctoral training at the Medical Breast Section of the National Cancer Institute in 1988.

== Career ==
Following his postdoctoral training at National Institutes of Health, Clarke joined Georgetown University School of Medicine as an assistant professor of physiology and biophysics, and was promoted to associate professor of oncology with tenure in 1995, and to professor in 1999. While joining University of Minnesota in 2020, he retains an appointment at Georgetown University as an adjunct professor of oncology. Since 2020, he is a tenured professor of biochemistry, molecular biology and biophysics at University of Minnesota.

Clarke also held several administrative appointments in his career. He served as secretary/treasurer of the Georgetown University Faculty Senate from 2004 until 2007, as associate vice president of Georgetown University Medical Center and director of Biomedical Graduate Research Organization at Georgetown University Medical Center from 2007 till 2019, as co-leader of Breast Cancer Program at Georgetown Lombardi Comprehensive Cancer Center 2006 through 2020, and as dean for research 2011 until 2019 at Georgetown University Medical Center. Since 2020, Clarke serves as executive director of Hormel Institute and member of the executive committee of Masonic Cancer Center at University of Minnesota.

== Research ==
Clarke's work is focused on how hormones (endogenous and exogenous) and related factors affect breast cancer. He focused initially on the interactions of hormones and anticancer drugs, and then expanded the work into studies of the underlying cellular and molecular mechanisms that explain how breast cancers become resistant to hormone and cytotoxic therapies. Clarke and his colleagues developed a series of hormone resistant breast cancer models that are now used in the field.

=== Breast cancer ===
As a systems and integrative cancer biology researcher, Clarke's research team and collaborators discovered a new signaling network and control mechanism that contributes to the hormonal regulation of breast cancer cell proliferation and cell death in response to estrogens and other endocrine therapies. This signaling includes communication between the endoplasmic reticulum and mitochondria, and reflects novel interactions within the unfolded protein response. His group has also identified interferon regulatory factor-1 as a breast cancer suppressor gene, and worked on the development and application of genomic and novel bioinformatic methods in translational breast cancer studies. Clarke also contributed to establishing the role of maternal diet in mammary gland development and breast cancer risk, the concept of metalloestrogens, the importance of continued expression of the estrogen receptor in endocrine resistance, and completed one of the first radiogenomic studies of breast cancer and meta-analyses of the role of soy exposure in breast cancer.

=== Endocrine resistance in breast cancer ===
Clarke identified some of the first non-nuclear activities of endocrine therapies including the effects of Tamoxifen and high dose estrogens on membrane fluidity. In his studies of drug resistance and MDR1/P-glycoprotein, he published the first statistical meta-analysis of the role of MDR1 in breast cancer, and defined novel mechanisms of resistance to Taxanes. He was among the pioneers to implicate the unfolded protein response (UPR) in acquired endocrine resistance and in regulating involution in the normal mammary gland. In addition, his research team implicated key BCL2 family members, interferon regulatory factor-1 and NFκB in endocrine resistance, and defined basic interactions among the UPR, autophagy and apoptosis, regulation of immune markers, and the role for epigenetic changes in determining trans-generational effects on endocrine responsiveness in breast cancer.

In his studies on the endocrine-mediated regulation of breast cancer progression and cell fate, he explored the concept that endocrine resistance reflects cell state transitions, where the transitions reflect integrated and adaptive signaling that includes control of endoplasmic reticulum, mitochondrial and nuclear functions. Together, this signaling is represented in a modular network that regulates and executes five key cell function modules (autophagy, cell death, metabolism, proliferation, and UPR).

== Awards and honors ==
- 1999 - Queen's University of Belfast, Clarke's alma mater, awarded Clarke a higher doctorate (DSc; by thesis) in recognition of his professional work.
- 2012 - Sigma Xi Distinguished Lecturer, National Cancer Institute
- 2019 - Fellow, the American Association for the Advancement of Science

== Bibliography (selected) ==
- Singh S, Weindorfer C, Nandi A, Selvam CP, Götze MM, Das M, Fallacshino A, Tjendra Y, Boone M, Dolznig H, Zhang Q, Clarke R, Thomas C & Chakrabarti R. (2025) DLL1-responsive PD-L1+ tumor-associated macrophages promote endocrine resistance in breast cancer. Science Translational Medicine, 17: eadr6207. PMID: 41191774
- Farsani SSM, Soni J, Jin L, Yadav AK, Bansal S, Mi T, Hilakivi-Clarke LA, Clarke R, Youngblood B, Cheema A. & Verma V. (2025) Pyruvate kinase M2 reprograms mitochondria in CD8 T cells, enhancing effector functions and efficacy of anti-PD1 therapy. Cell Metabolism, S1550-4131(25)00106-8. PMID: 40199327
- Korangath P, Jin L, Yang C-T, Healy S, Guo X, Ke S, Hu C, Gabrielson K, Foote J, Clarke, R. & Ivkov, R. (2024) Iron oxide nanoparticles inhibit tumor progression and suppress lung metastases in mouse models of breast cancer. ACS Nano 18:10509-10526. PMID: 38564478
- O'Sullivan CC, Clarke R, Goetz MP & Robertson JF. (2023) Cyclin Dependent 4/6 Kinase inhibitors for treatment of hormone receptor positive, HER2-negative breast cancer: past successes, current challenges, and future directions. JAMA Oncology, 9: 1273-1282. PMID: 37382948
- Fan M, Xia P, Clarke R, Wang Y & Li L. (2020) Radiogenomic signatures reveal multiscale intratumour heterogeneity associated with biological functions and survival in breast cancer. Nature Communications, 11:4861. PMID: 32978398
- Cook KL, Soto-Pantoja DR, Clarke PAG, Cruz I, Zwart A, Wärri A, Roberts DD, & Clarke, R. (2016) Endoplasmic reticulum stress protein, GRP78, modulates lipid metabolism to control breast tumor drug sensitivity and activate anti-tumor immunity. Cancer Research, 76:5657-5670. PMID: 27698188
- Schwartz-Roberts JL, Cook KL, Chen C, Shajahan-Haq AN, Axelrod M, Wärri A, Riggins RB, Jin L, Haddad BR, Kallakury BV, Baumann WT & Clarke, R. (2015) Interferon regulatory factor-1 signaling regulates the switch between autophagy and apoptosis to determine breast cancer cell fate. Cancer Research, 75: 1046-1055. PMID: 25576084
- Hu R, Wärri A, Jin L, Zwart A, Riggins RB & Clarke R. (2015) NFκB signaling is required for XBP1 (U and S) mediated effects on antiestrogen responsiveness and cell fate decisions in breast cancer cells. Molecular and Cellular Biology, 35: 379-390. PMID: 25368386
- Chen C, Baumann WT, Xing J, Xu L, Clarke R. & Tyson JJ. (2014) Mathematical models of the transitions between endocrine therapy responsive and resistant states in breast cancer. Journal of the Royal Society Interface, 11: 20140206. PMID: 24806707
- Cook KL, Shajahan AN, Jin L, Wärri A, Hilakivi-Clarke LA & Clarke R. (2012) Glucose regulated protein 78 controls crosstalk between apoptosis and autophagy to determine antiestrogen responsiveness. Cancer Research, 72: 3337-3349. PMID: 22752300
- Tyson JJ, Baumann WT, Chen C, Verdugo A, Tavassoly I, Wang Y, Weiner LM & Clarke R. (2011) Dynamic modelling of estrogen signaling and cell fate in breast cancer cells. Nature Reviews Cancer, 11: 523–532. PMID: 21677677
- Clarke R, Ressom H W, Wang A, Xuan J, Liu MC, Gehan EA & Wang Y. (2008) The properties of high-dimensional data spaces: implications for exploring gene and protein expression data. Nature Reviews Cancer, 8: 37–49. PMID: 18097463
- Wang LH, Yang XY, Zhang X, An P, Kim H-J, Huang J, Clarke R, Osborne CK, Inman JK, Appella E & Farrar WL. (2006) Disruption of estrogen receptor DNA-binding domain and related intramolecular communication restores tamoxifen sensitivity in resistant breast cancer. Cancer Cell, 10: 487-499. PMID: 17157789
- Trock B J, Hilakivi-Clarke L, & Clarke R. (2006). Meta-analysis of soy intake and breast cancer risk. Journal of the National Cancer Institute, 98: 459–471. PMID: 16595782
- Bouker KB, Skaar TC, Fernandez DR, O’Brien KA, Riggins RB, Honghua C & Clarke, R. (2004) Interferon regulatory factor-1 mediates the proapoptotic but not cell cycle arrest effects of the steroidal antiestrogen ICI 182,780 (Faslodex, Fulvestrant). Cancer Research, 64: 4030-4039. PMID: 15173018
- Pratt MAC, Bishop TE, White D, Yasvinski G, Ménard M, Niu MY & Clarke R. (2003) Estrogen withdrawal-induced NF-κB and Bcl-3 expression in breast cancer cells: roles in growth and hormone independence. Molecular and Cellular Biology, 23: 6887-6900. PMID: 12972607
- Arteaga CL, Koli KM, Dugger TC & Clarke R. (1999) Reversal of tamoxifen resistance of human breast carcinomas in vivo with neutralizing anti-transforming growth factor (TGF)-β antibodies. Journal of the National Cancer Institute, 91: 46-53. PMID: 9890169
- Trock BJ, Leonessa F & Clarke R. (1997) Multidrug resistance in breast cancer: a meta-analysis of MDR1/gp170 expression and its possible functional significance. Journal of the National Cancer Institute, 89: 917–931. PMID: 1359153
- Clarke R, Brünner N, Katzenellenbogen BS, Thompson EW, Norman MJ, Koppi C, Paik S, Lippman ME & Dickson RB (1989). Progression from hormone dependent to hormone independent growth in MCF-7 human breast cancer cells. Proceedings of the National Academy of Sciences USA, 86: 3649–3653. PMID: 2726742
