= Eugene Redd =

American baseball player

- Third baseman
- Born: October 31, 1899; Kansas City, Missouri, U.S.
- Died: August 23, 1955 (aged 55); Kansas City, Missouri, U.S.
- Batted: Right Threw: Right

Negro league baseball debut
- 1922, for the Cleveland Tate Stars

Last appearance
- 1923, for the Milwaukee Bears

Teams
- Cleveland Tate Stars (1922); Milwaukee Bears (1923)

Eugene Redd (October 31, 1899 – August 23, 1955) was an American Negro league third baseman in the 1920s.

A native of Kansas City, Missouri, Redd made his Negro leagues debut in 1922 for the Cleveland Tate Stars. The following season, he played for the Milwaukee Bears. Redd died in Kansas City in 1955 at age 55.
