= Bert Clarke =

Australian rules footballer

Personal information
- Full name: Bertram Telford Clarke
- Born: 29 March 1884; Bellarine, Victoria
- Died: 21 January 1956 (aged 71); Moonee Ponds, Victoria
- Original team: Bellarine

Playing career^{1}
Years	Club	Games (Goals)
1904	Geelong	4 (3)
- ^{1} Playing statistics correct to the end of 1904.

Bertram Telford Clarke (29 March 1884 – 21 January 1956) was an Australian rules footballer who played for the Geelong Football Club in the Victorian Football League (VFL).

== Football ==
He made his debut for Geelong against Fitzroy on 6 June 1904; he kicked one goal.
