= Bradley Grayson =

English footballer (born 1994)

Personal information
- Full name: Bradley Stephen Grayson
- Date of birth: 2 January 1993 (age 33)
- Place of birth: Doncaster, England
- Position: Forward

Team information
- Current team: Ossett United

Youth career
- 2007–2010: Doncaster Rovers

Senior career*
Years	Team	Apps	(Gls)
2010–2011	Doncaster Rovers	0	(0)
2011–2012	Frickley Athletic	28	(7)
2012–2013	Matlock Town		
2013	Ånge IF	21	(18)
2013	Ånge 2	1	(4)
2013–2014	Matlock Town		
2014	Cumberland United		
2014	Goole		
2014–2015	Stocksbridge Park Steels		
2015	Loyola Meralco Sparks	6	(9)
2015	Stocksbridge Park Steels		
2015–2016	Frickley Athletic		
2016–2017	Buxton	?	(20)
2017–2018	Mickleover Sports		
2018–2019	Buxton		
2019	→ Stafford Rangers (loan)	6	(5)
2019–2020	Stafford Rangers		
2020–2021	Frickley Athletic	1	(0)
2021	Grantham Town	5	(1)
2021–2022	Gainsborough Trinity	26	(6)
2022–	Ossett United	0	(0)
- * Club domestic league appearances and goals as of 21:00, 28 April 2022

Bradley Grayson (born 2 January 1993) is an English professional footballer who plays as a forward for Ossett United.

Coming through the youth academy at Doncaster Rovers, Grayson notably played as a professional in Sweden, Philippines and Australia for Ånge IF, Loyola Meralco Sparks and Cumberland United. The rest of his career has been spent playing semi-professionally in England's non-league system with Frickley Athletic, Matlock Town, Goole, Stocksbridge Park Steels, Buxton, Mickleover Sports, Stafford Rangers, Grantham Town and Gainsborough Trinity.

== Career ==
Grayson made his debut for Doncaster Rovers in August 2010, coming on in the 90th minute in his side's 2–1 loss after extra time to Accrington Stanley in the League Cup. He later went on to make the bench three times that season.

After being released by Doncaster in 2011, Grayson went on to play for Frickley Athletic as well as having spells at Matlock Town, Stocksbridge Park Steels and Mickleover Sports as well as playing in Sweden for Ånge, in Australia for Cumberland United and in the Philippines for Loyola Meralco Sparks. Joining Filipino club Loyola Meralco Sparks in the summer 2015, he left the club again in September 2015 to return to Stocksbridge Park Steels. He left the club a few weeks later and then joined another of his former clubs, Frickley Athletic.

In September 2017, Grayson began a job as a cover supervisor in Doncaster.

In January 2018, Grayson returned to Buxton for the second time. He went on a one-month loan at Stafford Rangers on 12 October 2019 and the deal was then made permanent at the end of the spell in November 2019 after scoring five goals in his six appearances for the club on loan.

In July 2020, Grayson rejoined Frickley Athletic for the fourth time, scoring on his first start of the season in the F.A. Cup against Newcastle Benfield. In June 2021, Grayson decided to leave the club once again.

He signed for Northern Premier League Premier League side Gainsborough Trinity on a free transfer in September 2021.

Grayson was not retained by Trinity at the end of the season. Trinity initially did a u-turn and re-signed Grayson for the 2022–23 season, however on 13 September 2022 he signed for Ossett United.
