= Rafael Santo Domingo =

Puerto Rican baseball player (born 1955)

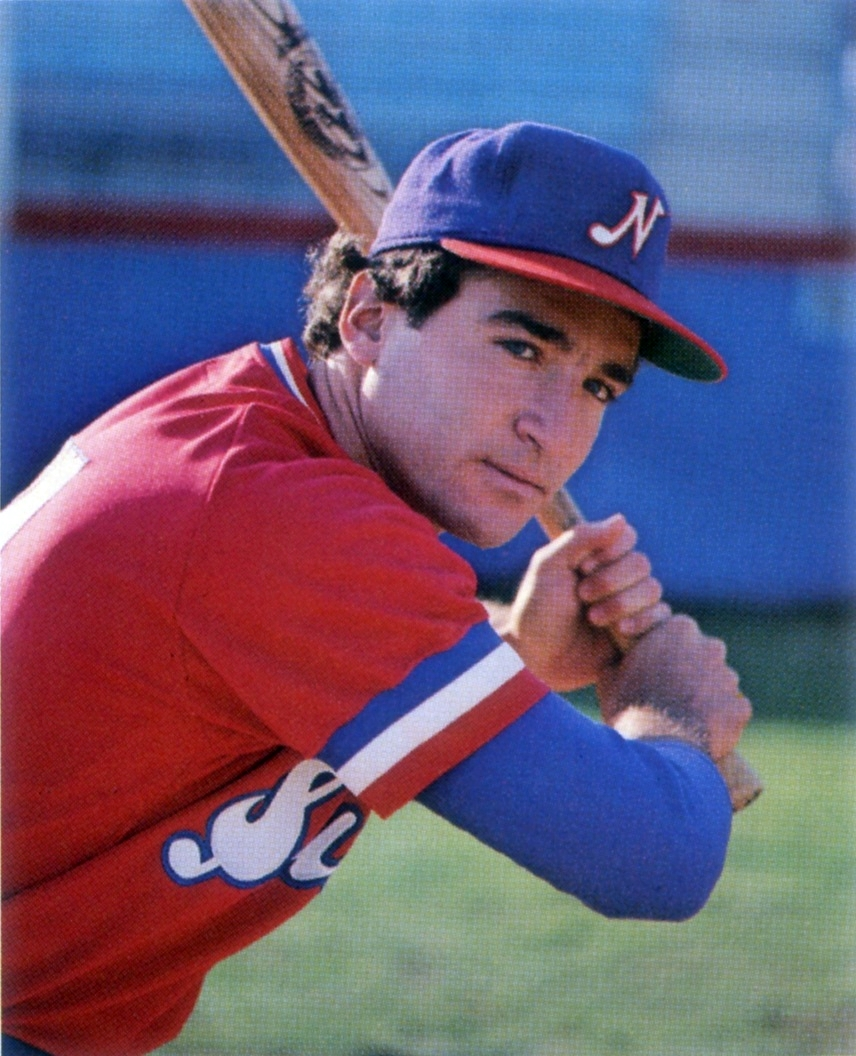
- Infielder
- Born: November 24, 1955 (age 70); Orocovis, Puerto Rico
- Batted: Switch Threw: Right

MLB debut
- September 7, 1979, for the Cincinnati Reds

Last MLB appearance
- September 30, 1979, for the Cincinnati Reds

MLB statistics
- Batting average: .167
- Runs: 0
- Hits: 1
- Stats at Baseball Reference

Teams
- Cincinnati Reds (1979)

Rafael Santo Domingo Molina (born November 24, 1955) is a Puerto Rican former minor-league infielder who appeared briefly in the Major Leagues, for the Cincinnati Reds, as a pinch hitter in September 1979. A native of Orocovis, Puerto Rico, he was signed by the Reds as an amateur free agent in 1974. Santo Domingo played his last professional season with their Triple-A affiliates, the Indianapolis Indians, in 1980.

Formerly the hitting coach of the Pulaski Mariners, Santo Domingo is now an area scout based in Puerto Rico for the Seattle Mariners.
