= Dell Clark =

Professional baseball player

- Shortstop/Second baseman
- Born: May 10, 1891; Topeka, Kansas, U.S.
- Died: July 28, 1955 (aged 64); Topeka, Kansas, U.S.
- Batted: Unknown Threw: Right

Negro league baseball debut
- 1921, for the St. Louis Giants

Last appearance
- 1921, for the Pittsburgh Keystones

Teams
- St. Louis Giants (1921); Pittsburgh Keystones (1921)

Robert Wardell Clark (May 10, 1891 - July 28, 1955) was an American professional baseball infielder in the Negro leagues. He played with the St. Louis Giants and the Pittsburgh Keystones in 1921.
