= Robbie Clark =

Footballer, who plays for Östersunds Fotbollsklubb

Personal information
- Full name: Robert Jack Clark
- Date of birth: 30 April 1991 (age 35)
- Place of birth: Kingston upon Hull, England
- Position: Midfielder

Senior career*
Years	Team	Apps	(Gls)
2009–2011	Doncaster Rovers	0	(0)
2009	→ Boston United (loan)	2	(0)
2010	→ Brigg Town (loan)	3	(0)
2011	Östersunds FK	12	(2)
2012	Skellefteå FF	22	(0)
- * Club domestic league appearances and goals

Robert Jack Clark (born 30 April 1991 in Kingston upon Hull, Yorkshire, England), is a footballer, who plays for Östersunds Fotbollsklubb.

== Career ==
He spent time on loan in 2009 at Northern Premier League outfit Boston United only making two appearances. He made his debut on 19 September 2009 against Whitby Town at York Street, coming on as a substitute for Danny Sleath. Clark started his next league game against Buxton. He then spent a month-long loan at Northern Premier League side Brigg Town.

He made his debut for Rovers on 10 August 2010 in the Football League Cup first round clash with Accrington Stanley which ended in a 2–1 home defeat at the Keepmoat Stadium.

The midfielder left in January 2011 Doncaster Rovers of the Football League Championship and joined on 12 March 2011 on loan to Östersunds Fotbollsklubb.

Robbie then went on to spend the rest of the season playing football for Ostersunds FK (Sweden)until October 2011 on a permanent deal to the end of the season. The team gained promotion from division 2 to division 1, Robbie played a holding midfield role, scoring 10 goals whilst assisting set ups for many more. Robbie played 20 games out of 22 in the season.

In 2012 season Robbie moved clubs to play for Skelleftea FF division 2 Sweden, where he captained the side to 5th in the league at the age of 21 years, Robbie played every game of the season, 22 all in all. He went on to win players, players of the season and managers players of the season. Clark left in March 2013 after just one season his club Skellefteå FF.
