= Charles Clark =

Charles Clark may refer to:

== Arts and entertainment ==
- Charles Clark (publisher, born 1806) (1806–1860), English farmer, poet and satirist
- Charles Heber Clark (1841–1915), American humorist
- Charles W. Clark (1865–1925), American baritone
- Charles Badger Clark (1883–1957), American poet
- Charles Clark (musician) (1945–1969), American jazz bassist
- Charles Dow Clark (1869–1959), actor and American football coach and referee

== Military ==
- Charles A. Clark (1841–1913), American soldier and Medal of Honor recipient
- Charles Edgar Clark (1843–1922), U.S. Navy officer
- Charles Clark (admiral) (1902–1965), Australian admiral
- Charles Carr Clark (1866–1930), officer in the United States Army

== Politics and law ==
- Charles Clark (Mississippi politician) (1811–1877), governor of Mississippi during the American Civil War
- Charles H. Clark (1818–1873), mayor of Rochester, New York
- Charles N. Clark (1827–1902), U.S. representative from Missouri
- Charles Clark (Australian politician) (1832–1896), member of the Legislative Assembly of Queensland
- Charles B. Clark (1844–1891), U.S. representative from Wisconsin
- Charles Dickens Clark (1847–1908), U.S. federal judge
- Charles Edward Clark (1889–1963), U.S. Court of Appeals judge; dean of Yale Law School
- Charles Clark (judge) (1925–2011), U.S. Court of Appeals judge
- Joe Clark (Charles Joseph Clark, born 1939), prime minister of Canada

== Sports ==
- Charles Clark (rugby union) (1857–1943), English rugby union player
- Charles Clark (Canterbury cricketer) (1866–1950), New Zealand cricketer
- Charles Clark (Auckland cricketer) (1883–1970), New Zealand cricketer
- Sensation Clark (Charles Douglas Clark, 1902–1964), American baseball player
- Boobie Clark (Charles L. Clark, 1950–1988), American football player
- Charles Clark (sprinter) (born 1987), American sprinter
- Chuck Clark (Charles Edward Clark Jr., born 1995), American football player
- Chuck Clark (ice hockey) (Charles William Clark, 1891– 1970), British-born Canadian ice hockey player

== Others ==
- Charles Clark (lecturer) (1838–1903), English Baptist minister and lecturer
- Charles W. Clark (businessman) (1871–1933), American businessman
- Charles Upson Clark (1875–1960), American historian
- Charles Walter Clark (1885–1972), English architect to London's Metropolitan Railway
- Charles Clark (publisher, born 1933) (1933–2006), British publisher and expert on copyright

== See also ==
- Charles Clarke (disambiguation)
- Charlie Clark (disambiguation)
