= Charlie Clark =

Charlie Clark may refer to:

- Charlie Clark (Scottish footballer) (1878–1930), Scottish footballer
- Charlie Clark (English footballer) (1917–1943), English footballer
- Charlie Clark (politician), Canadian politician

== See also ==
- Charles Clark (disambiguation)
- Charles Clarke (disambiguation)
