= Charles Clarke (disambiguation) =

Charles Clarke (born 1950) is a former British member of parliament.

Charles Clarke may also refer to:

== Politicians ==
- Charles Clarke (judge) (died 1750), English barrister, judge and politician
- Charles Clarke (Canadian politician) (1826–1909), speaker of the Legislative Assembly of Ontario, Canada
- Charles E. Clarke (1790–1863), U.S. representative from New York
- Charles Goddard Clarke (1849–1908), Liberal member of parliament for Peckham, 1906–1908
- Charles Bailey Clarke (1875–1944), mayor of Portland, Maine, 1918–1921
- Sir Charles Clarke, 3rd Baronet (1839–1932), English quartermaster-general and governor of Malta
- Charles A. Clarke (1941–2022), Liberian politician

== Sportspeople ==
- Charlie Clarke (footballer, born 1879) (1879–1946), Australian rules footballer
- Charlie Clarke (footballer, born 2004), Australian rules footballer
- Charles Clarke (cricketer, born 1910) (1910–1997), English cricketer
- Charles Clarke (cricketer, born 1878) (1878–?), Scottish cricketer
- Charles Clarke (Surrey cricketer) (1853–1931), English cricketer

== Other people ==
- Charles Clarke (numismatist) (1719–1780), English numismatist and antiquarian
- Charles Clarke (botanist), Australian botanist
- Charles Clarke (RAF officer) (1923–2019), British RAF officer and Great Escape lookout
- Charles Baron Clarke (1832–1906), British botanist
- Charles Clarke (antiquary) (died 1840), English antiquary
- Charles Edwin Clarke (1885–1952), New Zealand entomologist and dentist
- Charles E. J. Clarke (1795–1844), English organist
- Charles Kirk Clarke (1857–1924), Canadian psychiatrist
- Charlie Clarke (Blue Heelers), fictional character in Australian program, Blue Heelers
- Charles Cowden Clarke (1787–1877), English author
- Charles G. Clarke (1899–1983), American cinematographer
- Charles Clarke (priest) (1871–1947), Anglican priest and author
- C. Allen Clarke (1863–1935), English novelist and journalist
- Sir Charles Clarke, 2nd Baronet (1812–1899)
- Sir Charles Mansfield Clarke, 1st Baronet (1782–1857), British surgeon
- Charles Henry Douglas Clarke (died 1981), Canadian forester and zoologist
- Charles Boss Clarke (1836–1899), American architect
- Charles Herbert Clarke (1852–1928), American tenor, church musician, choral conductor, and music educator

== See also ==
- Charles Clark (disambiguation)
- Charles Clerke (disambiguation)
