= Architecture of St. Louis =

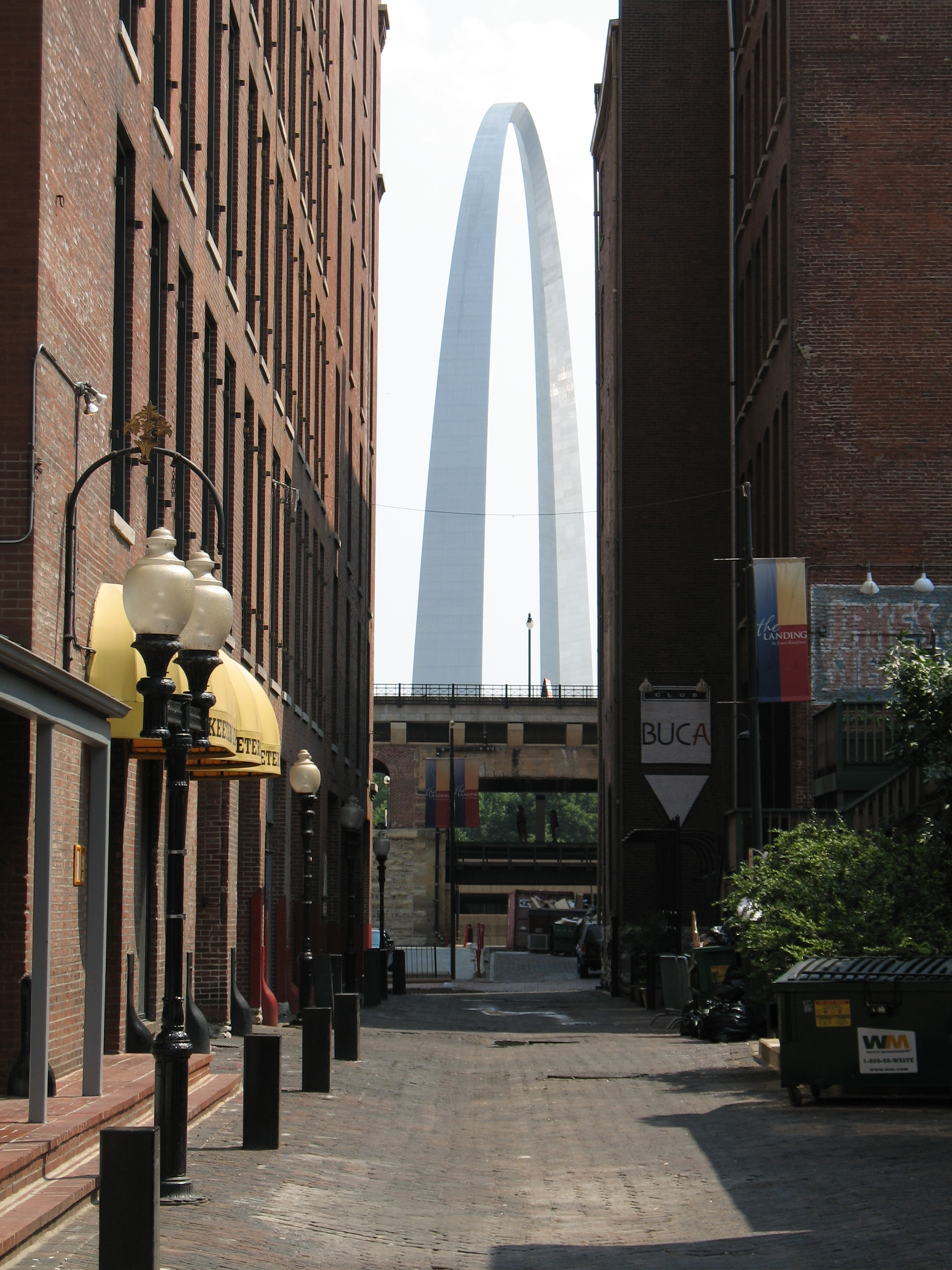
View of the Arch from Laclede's Landing.

The architecture of St. Louis exhibits a variety of commercial, residential, and monumental architecture. St. Louis, Missouri is known for the Gateway Arch, the tallest monument constructed in the United States. Architectural influences reflected in the area include French Colonial, German, early American, European influenced, French Second Empire, Victorian, and modern architectural styles.

== Skyscrapers ==
St. Louis was home to a cluster of early skyscrapers during the late 19th century. Two of Louis Sullivan's important early skyscrapers stand among a crop of similar office buildings and department stores built up between 1890 and 1915. His Wainwright Building (1891) features strong base-pediment-shaft massing and an insistently vertical pattern of ornament; his Union Trust Building of 1893 was stripped of its cave-like street-level ironwork in 1924.

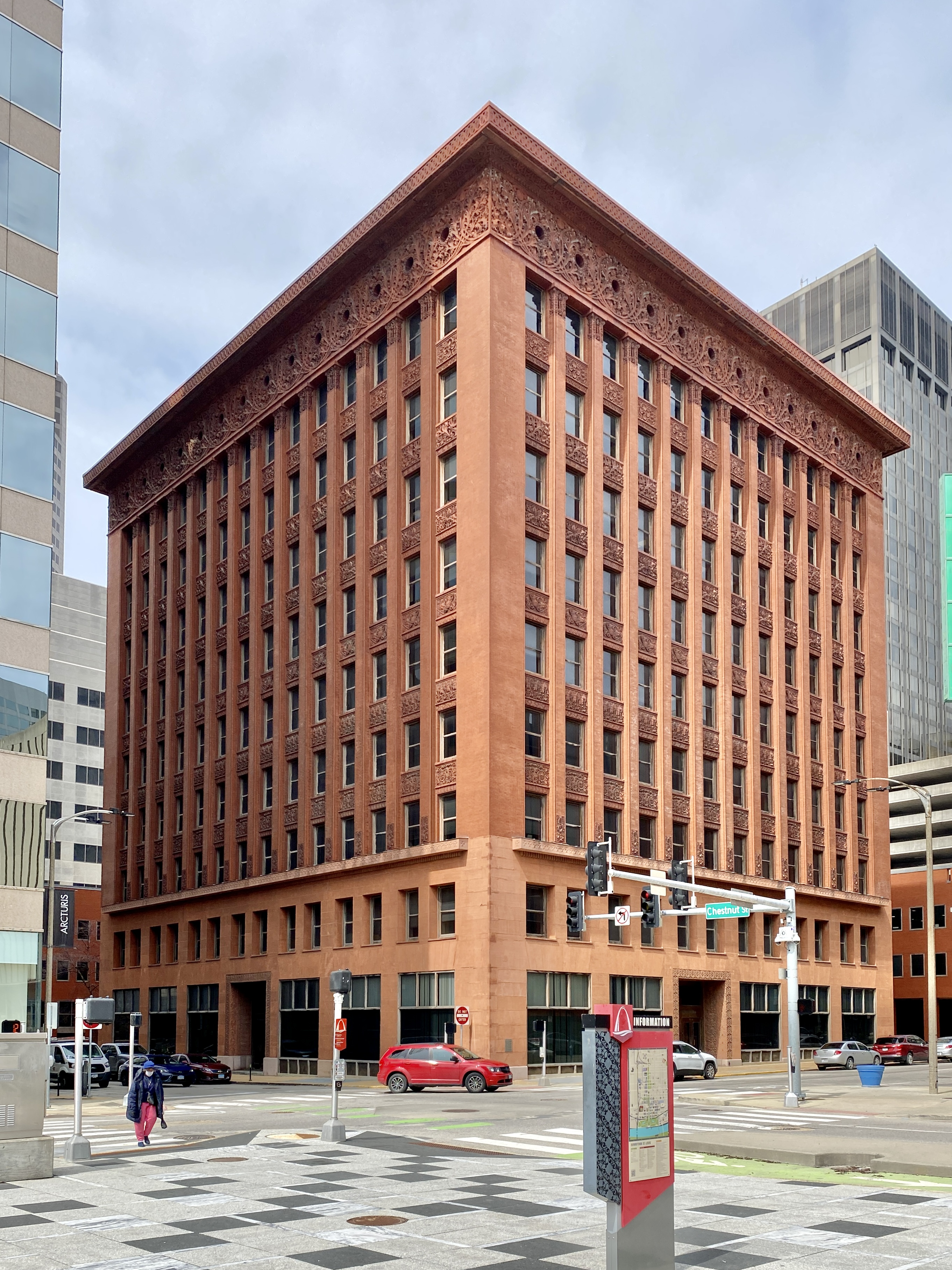
Wainwright Building (1891) by Louis Sullivan.

Beyond Sullivan's work, other significant downtown skyscrapers of those years were Railway Exchange Building (1913) by John Mauran, the Fagin Building by Charles B. Clarke, and the now-demolished Merchants Exchange Building. Some warehouse and factory buildings of the early 20th century have been transformed into local attractions, such as the International Shoe factory building and its renovation into the St. Louis City Museum. However, some buildings of significance have been demolished, such as the St. Louis Century Building.

In Midtown St. Louis, a group of theaters and skyscraper office buildings was constructed between the Central West End and downtown, such as the Gothic Revival Continental-Life Building (1929) and the Neo-Renaissance Fox Theatre (1929). The Fox, designed by C. Howard Crane, was an exuberant movie palace that once seated more than 5,000 and was the second-largest cinema in the United States. Since 1982, it has been used as a performance hall. Another venue in Midtown built in the 1920s is the Neo-classical Powell Symphony Hall (1925), formerly a cinema and vaudeville theater, now the home of the St. Louis Symphony.

Some notable post-modern commercial skyscrapers were built downtown in the 1970s and 1980s, including the One US Bank Plaza (1976), the AT&T Center (1986), and One Metropolitan Square (1989), which is the tallest building in St. Louis. One US Bank Plaza, the local headquarters for US Bancorp, was constructed for the Mercantile Bancorporation in the Structural expressionist style, emphasizing the steel structure of the building.

During the 1990s, St. Louis saw the construction of the largest United States courthouse by area, the Thomas F. Eagleton United States Courthouse (completed in 2000). The Eagleton Courthouse is home to the United States District Court for the Eastern District of Missouri and the United States Court of Appeals for the Eighth Circuit. The most recent high-rise buildings in St. Louis include four residential towers: the Park East Tower in the Central West End, The Tower at ŌPOP and One Cardinal Way located downtown, and One Hundred Above the Park in the Central West End, the tallest building outside of downtown.

== Landmarks and monuments ==
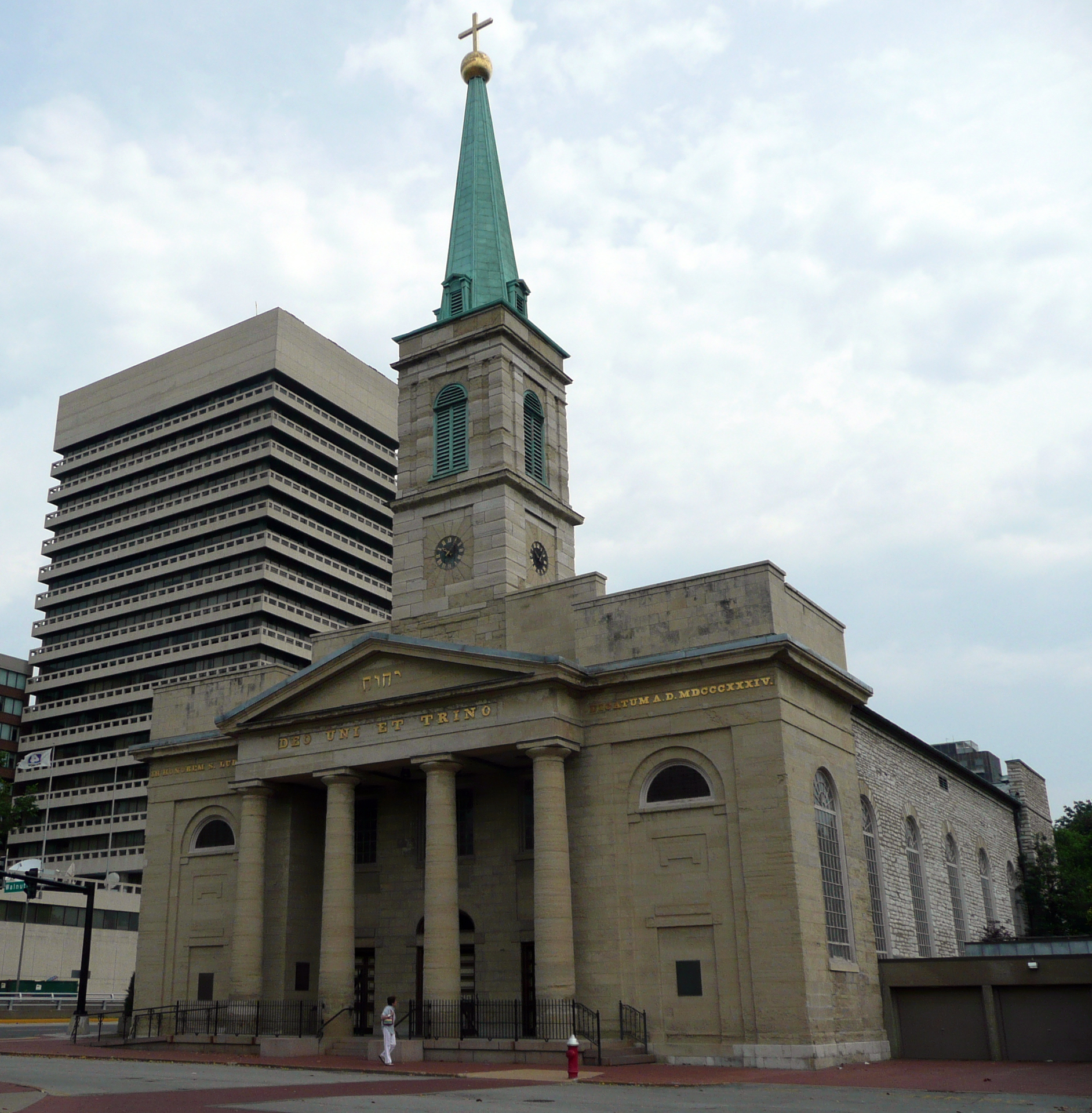
Basilica of St. Louis, King of France (a.k.a. Old Cathedral)

Several examples of religious structures are extant from the pre-Civil War period, and most reflect the common residential styles of the time. Among the earliest is the Basilica of St. Louis, King of France (locally referred to as the Old Cathedral). The Basilica was built between 1831 and 1834 in the Federal style. Other religious buildings from the period include SS. Cyril and Methodius Church (1857) in the Romanesque Revival style and Christ Church Cathedral (completed in 1867, designed in 1859) in the Gothic Revival style.

Only a few civic buildings were constructed during the early 19th century. The original St. Louis courthouse was built in 1826 and featured a Federal-style stone facade with a rounded portico. However, this courthouse was replaced during the renovation and expansion of the building in the 1850s. The Old St. Louis County Courthouse (locally known as the Old Courthouse) was completed in 1864 and was notable for having an early cast-iron dome and for being the tallest structure in Missouri until 1894. Finally, a customs house was constructed in the Greek Revival style in 1852 but was demolished and replaced in 1873 by the U.S. Customhouse and Post Office.

Because much of the city's early commercial and industrial development was centered along the riverfront, many pre-Civil War buildings were demolished during the construction of the Gateway Arch. The city's remaining architectural heritage of the era includes a multi-block district of cobblestone streets and brick and cast-iron warehouses called Laclede's Landing. Now popular for its restaurants and nightclubs, the district is located north of Gateway Arch along the riverfront. Other industrial buildings from the era include some portions of the Anheuser-Busch Brewery, which date to the early 1860s.

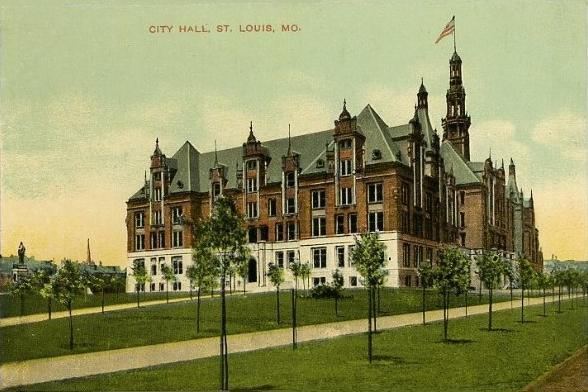
St. Louis City Hall, built in 1904

St. Louis saw a vast expansion in the variety and number of religious buildings during the late 19th century and early 20th century. The largest and most ornate of these is the Cathedral Basilica of St. Louis, designed by Thomas P. Barnett and constructed between 1907 and 1914 in the Neo-Byzantine style. The St. Louis Cathedral, as it is known, has one of the largest mosaic collections in the world. Another landmark in the religious architecture of St. Louis is St. Stanislaus Kostka, which is an example of the Polish Cathedral style. Among the other major designs of the period were St. Alphonsus Liguori (locally known as The Rock Church) (1867) in the Gothic Revival and the Second Presbyterian Church of St. Louis (1900) in Richardsonian Romanesque.

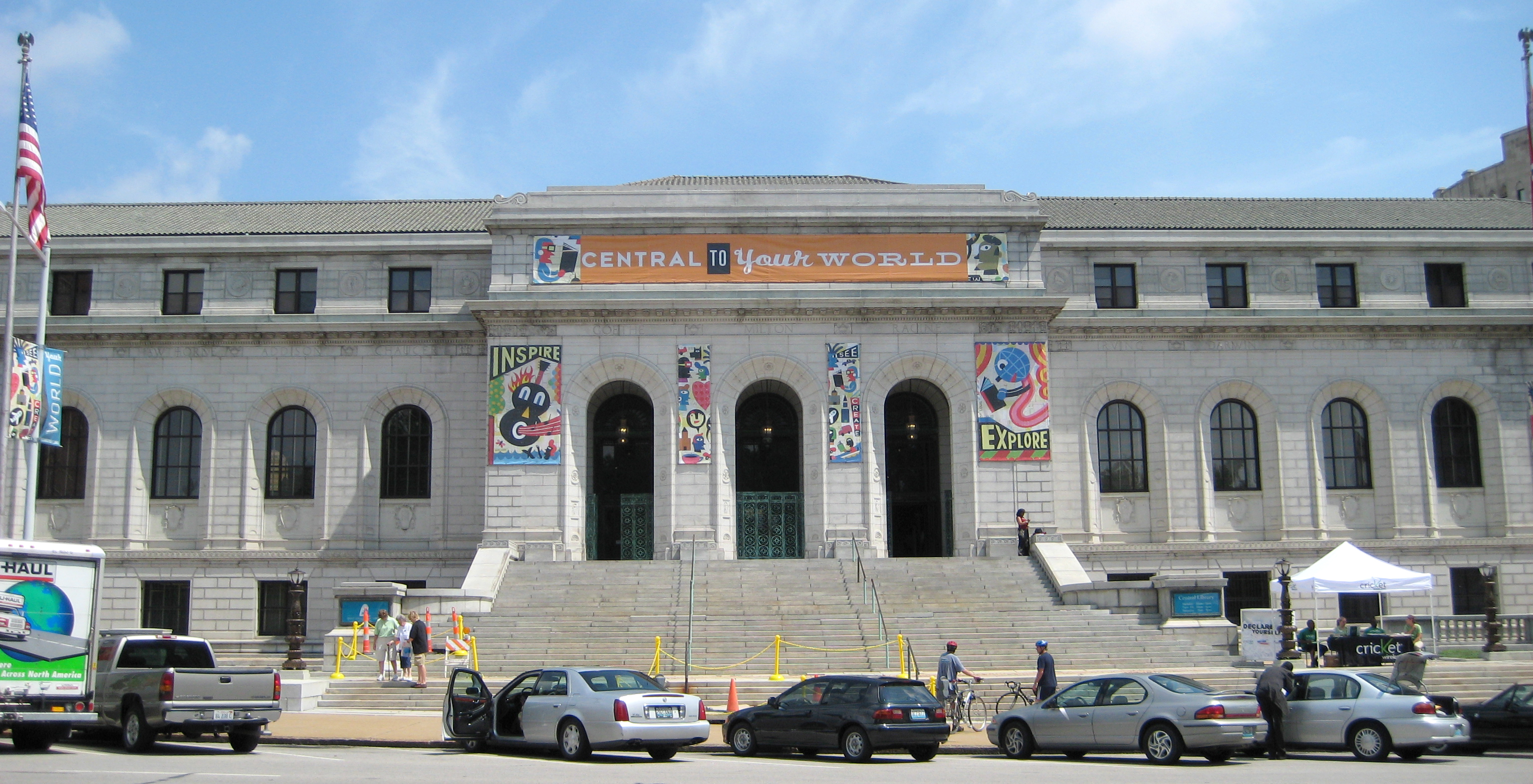
The central branch of the St. Louis Public Library, designed by Cass Gilbert (1912)

Early in the 20th century (and during the years before and after the 1904 World's Fair), several churches moved to the Central West End neighborhood, near Forest Park and the fairgrounds. The neighborhood features the Holy Corners Historic District, which is a concentration of several historic religious structures, such as the First Church of Christ, Scientist (1904).

By the 1900 census, St. Louis was the fourth largest city in the country. In 1904, the city hosted a world's fair at Forest Park called the Louisiana Purchase Exposition with Brookings Hall of Washington University in St. Louis serving as its administrative center. Its architectural legacy is somewhat scattered. Among the fair-related cultural institutions in the park are the Saint Louis Art Museum designed by Cass Gilbert, part of the remaining lagoon at the foot of Art Hill, and the Flight Cage at the St. Louis Zoo. The Missouri History Museum was built afterward, with the profit from the fair. But 1904 left other assets to the city, like Theodore Link's 1894 St. Louis Union Station, and an improved Forest Park.

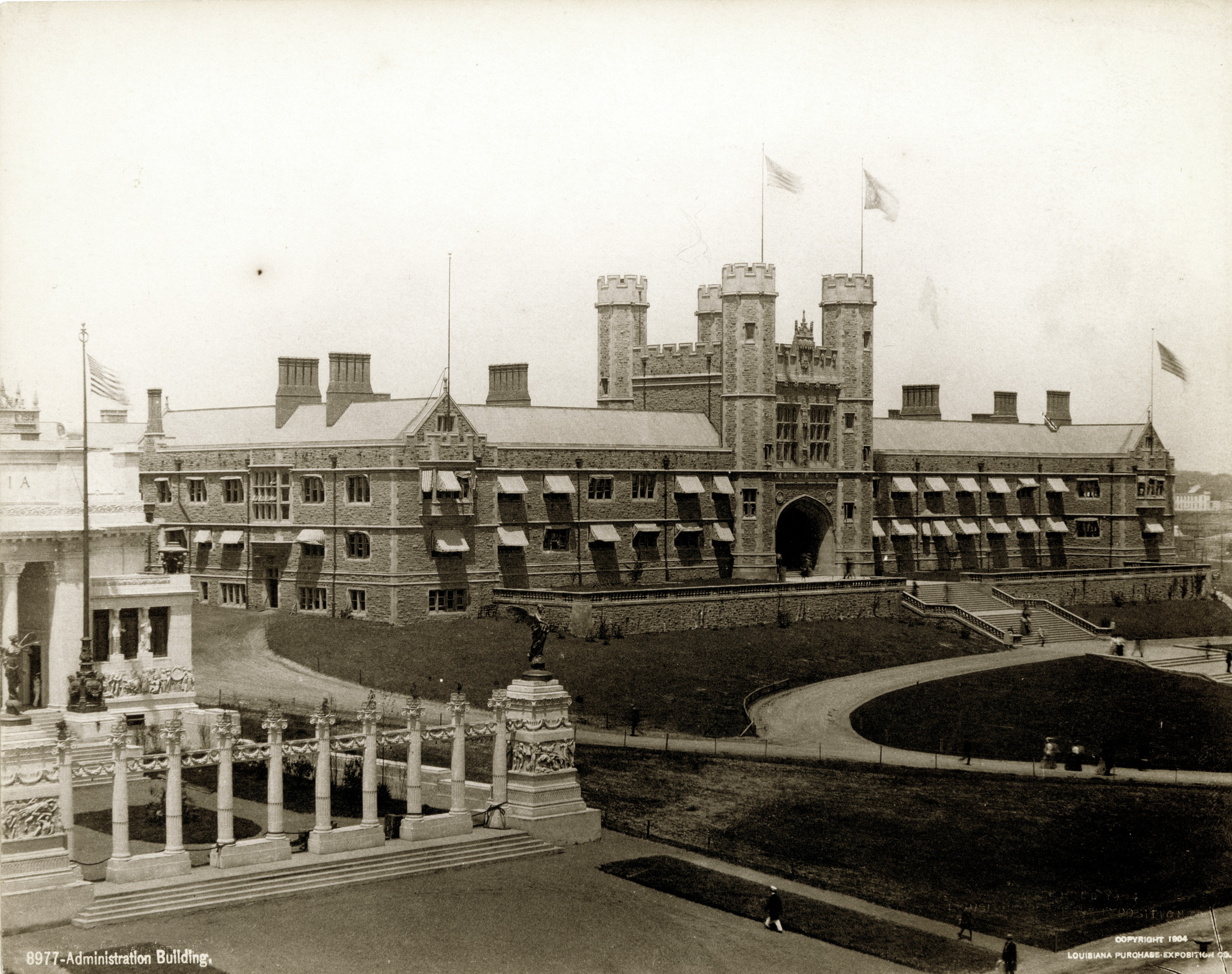
Brookings Hall at Washington University in St. Louis

Louis Sullivan designed Charlotte Dickson Wainwright's tomb on the north side of Bellefontaine Cemetery, surrounded by a collection of similar tombs for the great old St. Louis families, interesting for their late-Gilded Age artwork.

Shortly after the Civil War, St. Louis rapidly increased its school system and hospital system. One of the earliest structures and the oldest extant hospital building in St. Louis is the St. Louis Insane Asylum (now the Metropolitan St. Louis Psychiatric Center). The asylum is built of brick in the Italianate style, complete with a cast-iron dome and cupola reminiscent of the Old Courthouse.

As St. Louis expanded, the city hall was moved further west of downtown to its present location in 1904 (construction began in 1892). St. Louis City Hall, still in use, was designed by Harvey Ellis in the Renaissance Revival style. City Hall also is reminiscent of the famed Hôtel de Ville, Paris, France.

Other significant civic buildings from the late 19th century and early 20th century include the U.S. Customhouse and Post Office by Alfred B. Mullett (1873) and the stately St. Louis Public Library by Cass Gilbert (1912). The Old Post Office and the St. Louis Public Library have recently been renovated. In 1923 the city passed an $87 million bond issue for the re-development of the Civic Plaza along the lines of the City Beautiful movement. This development resulted in some of St. Louis's major civic architecture: the Soldiers' Memorial, the Civil Courts Building, and Kiel Auditorium.

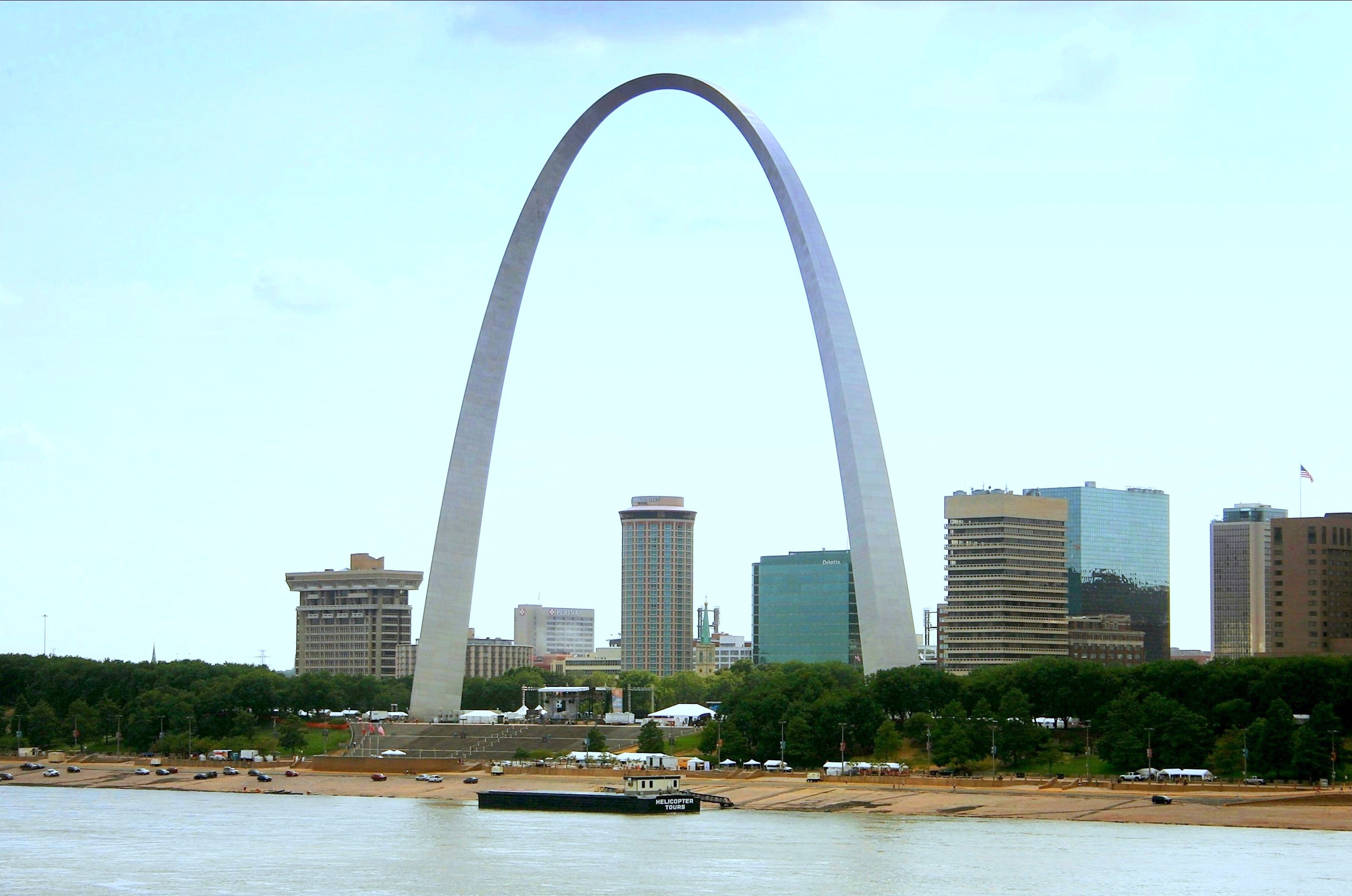
The southern half of the Downtown St. Louis skyline behind the Gateway Arch (center.)

Then into the 1940s and 1950s, a certain subgenre of St. Louis modernism emerged, with the locally important Harris Armstrong, and a series of daring modern civic landmarks like Gyo Obata's Planetarium, the geodesic-dome Climatron, and the main terminal building at Lambert-St. Louis International Airport. The Poplar Street Bridge, a 647-foot (197 m) long (197m) deck girder bridge, was built in 1967 and continues to carry three Interstates and one U.S. route. St. Louis also was the headquarters for postwar modernist bank designer Wenceslaus Sarmiento, whose major work in St. Louis is the Chancery Building (1965) on the grounds of the Cathedral Basilica of St. Louis. The culmination of St. Louis modern architecture is Eero Saarinen's magnificent stainless-steel gesture, the Gateway Arch, centerpiece of the 91-acre (370,000 m^{2}) riverside Jefferson National Expansion Memorial.

== Residential forms ==
The earliest buildings in St. Louis were constructed in the French Colonial style. Although Spain took possession of the Louisiana territory in 1764 via the Treaty of Fontainebleau (1762) and the Treaty of Paris (1763) (and defended against a French rebellion in 1768), St. Louis remained largely a refuge for French settlers. Hence, St. Louis remained largely a refuge for French architecture well into the late 18th century. Three distinct types of residential construction existed in early St. Louis, all of which reflected a French influence. The most common was the French Colonial vertical-log house, constructed of palisaded wood beams for walls. Roofs consisted of thatch or wood shingles. According to the St. Louis Preservation Commission, at least two-thirds of St. Louis homes in the late 18th century were of this type.

The second type was a frame house, usually in the French colonial tradition. Such homes were built in the poteaux-sur-sol (posts on sill) method, in which a wood-frame home was built on a heavy wood sill set atop a masonry and rock foundation. Roofing was similar to the palisaded homes.

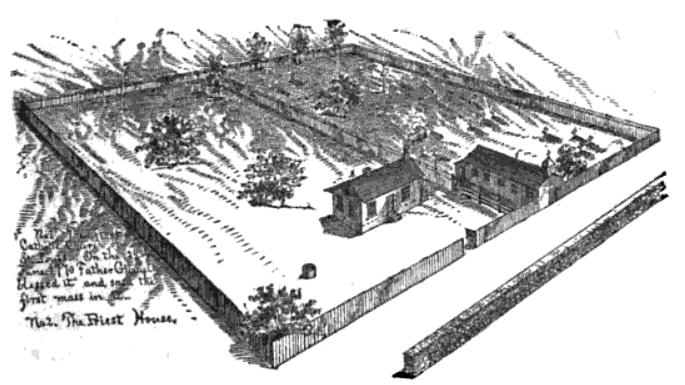
The first Catholic church in St. Louis, built in 1770, later replaced with the Basilica of St. Louis, King of France

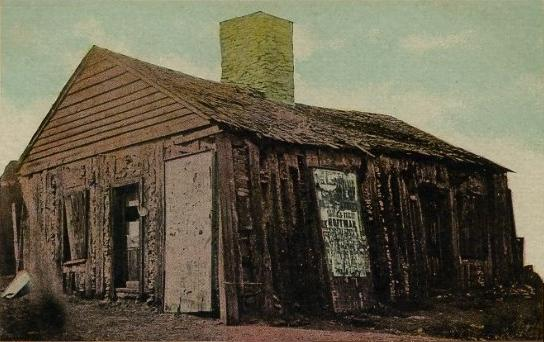
Postcard photograph of a building from early St. Louis, showing palisade wall construction

The third style of early St. Louis homes was a rock house. Only the wealthiest St. Louisans might afford a home built entirely of rock walls with a masonry foundation due to the difficulty of construction. The earliest house in St. Louis, the home of Pierre Laclede, was made of rock. Similar to the palisade and post-in-sill homes, rock houses tended to have steeply pitched roofs with a gradual slope on galleries and porches.

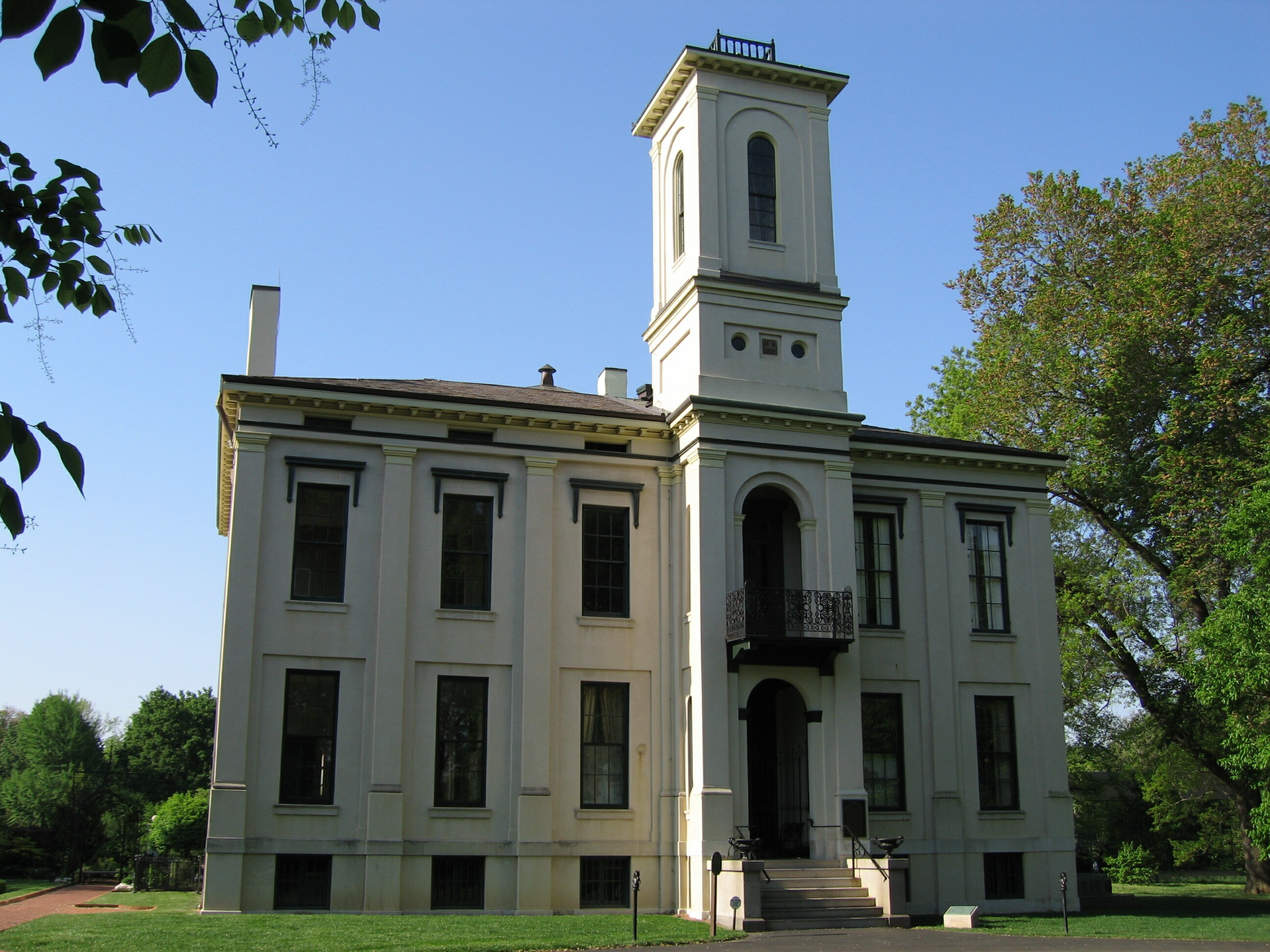
Tower Grove House, built in 1849 for Henry Shaw

=== Rural houses ===
The earliest American homes in St. Louis were crude, usually of log construction. Outlying homes in the farmlands were minimally ornamented and were usually of one or two-room construction. However, some rural homes were of the I-house style or were built with central hallways connecting a two-room house. Such rural homes often were overtaken by the rapidly expanding city and demolished. However, some rural homes were more developed and became integrated into the street grid of St. Louis.

The more developed rural homes in early St. Louis often bear the mark of the Federal Style, with simple and symmetrical façades, shuttered windows, and minimal ornament. Although many such homes were built, only a handful survive. Among these is the Lewis Bissell House (1820), now a restaurant and banquet facility.

Other rural styles found in early St. Louis included Greek Revival, Italianate, and Gothic Revival. The Chatillon-DeMenil House (1849) was originally constructed in the Federal Style, only later to be rebuilt and enlarged in Greek Revival. One of the more notable rural Italianate homes in St. Louis was Tower Grove House (designed by George I. Barnett in 1849), built in what was then Henry Shaw's garden, later becoming Missouri Botanical Garden.

Other early influences included German architecture, specifically the fachwerk construction method. Fachwerk construction generally has been enclosed in wooden siding, making such homes appear to be traditional frame homes. Because of the relative difficulty of fachwerk construction, few homes were built after 1840 using the technique. Almost all examples of fachwerk construction exist within the Soulard or Carondelet neighborhoods. German immigrants also brought with them a tradition of stone house construction, with several examples remaining in the Carondelet neighborhood.

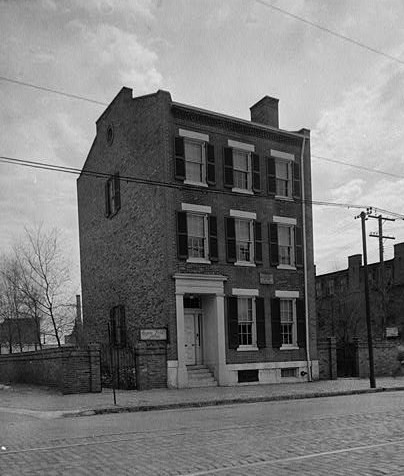
Eugene Field House, built as a townhouse in 1829

=== Urban houses ===
The majority of urban homes were of the townhouse type (also known as terraced housing). Similar in style to the country homes of the same period, urban homes in St. Louis were of the Greek Revival, Federal and Italianate styles. Many homes in St. Louis were constructed in a vernacular blending of these forms, even in then-fashionable areas such as Lucas Park or Lafayette Square. Among the homes with a blended style is the Joseph Campbell House (1851), which has been renovated and operated as a museum. Another of Henry Shaw's homes, the Henry Shaw City House (1851), was a prime example of a mixture of Federal and Italianate styles in the city. The Shaw City House later was moved to the Missouri Botanical Garden in the 1890s. One of the oldest extant townhouses in the city is the Eugene Field House (1829).

Some less ornamented urban house designs also originated in the pre-Civil War period. These include a variety of shotgun houses, narrow-front houses with side entry, and flounder houses. St. Louis is home to a large collection of flounder houses, which are narrow homes with side entry but having a sloped roof moving from a side wall to another side wall, often with the gable facing the street. In the working-class neighborhoods of St. Louis where space was at a premium, tenement houses often faced a street while flounder houses faced an alleyway on the same lot.

St. Louis' residential stock expanded dramatically during the late 19th century and early 20th century. Like many other cities, St. Louis has its share of Victorian homes, including a fair number of Second Empire-style homes in Lafayette Square. During the late 19th century, St. Louis became significant in urban design for its private places, residential developments with large mansions with commonly owned facilities like streets and gardens. Dating from between 1865 and 1910, many of these developments remain well-preserved and functioning private enclaves.

Among the significant styles found in the private places are Chateauesque, Beaux-Arts (at No. 9 Portland Place, built in 1897), Tudor Revival (at No. 1 Hortense Place), and Jacobethan (at No. 28 Portland Place, built in 1919). However, new styles of architecture were not confined to private developments. In areas further west, St. Louis homes show the influence of the Arts and Crafts Movement and the Prairie style (especially within what is now the West Cabanne Place Historic District).

After World War I, many new homes began to reflect the Colonial Revival style, with traditional brick, dormers, cornices, and strict symmetry. A prime example of St. Louis Colonial Revival is located at 47 Portland Place. Much of St. Louis' working-class housing in the 1920s and 1930s were bungalows, which appear throughout south St. Louis. At the same time, the central corridor extending west from downtown saw an increase in low-rise and high-rise apartment buildings.

Some of the more opulent residential architecture of the 1920s and 1930s was among these apartments and hotels. The Central West End neighborhood features several examples, including the Chase Park Plaza Hotel (built in 1931 in the Art Deco style) and Hampden Hall (built in 1925 in Neo-Renaissance style).

Few civic buildings existed during the French period, during which time government business often was conducted at the home of the governor (usually the home of Pierre Laclede). The first (and only) religious structure was a palisaded church now, built circa 1770, which was replaced in the early 1810s (and replaced again in 1834 by the Basilica of St. Louis, King of France).

After the sale of Louisiana (including St. Louis) to the United States in 1804, more Americans began moving to the village. These Americans built homes of frame construction prior to the mid-1810s, but after this point, began building using brick. Some photographs exist of these early structures and of French residences from the 18th century; however, no examples of colonial-era structures are known to exist in St. Louis.

== Urban renewal and preservation ==
After the 1950s, suburban expansion reduced the commercial and residential density of the city, while in 1957, nearby Clayton, Missouri eliminated its height limitations on buildings. Clayton, which is the county seat of St. Louis County, Missouri, became an alternative to downtown St. Louis for commercial construction in the 1960s and 1970s. Various urban renewal projects cleared several low-income areas of St. Louis for residential housing projects.

The first of these projects was the relatively successful Cochran Gardens, constructed in 1953 and home to white residents until 1956 when the project was integrated. Shortly after the construction of Cochran Gardens, the later-infamous Pruitt–Igoe project replaced the DeSoto-Carr neighborhood with its 33 eleven-story towers. By the mid-to-late 1960s, these projects had become decayed themselves. Although Pruitt–Igoe was designed by Minoru Yamasaki with several innovative living features, the project ultimately was demolished in the 1970s. Although Cochran Gardens' management was turned over to a tenant association in 1976, it later returned to city control in the 1990s and was demolished in 2008 after several years of decay.

In recent years, several organizations have attempted to promote the preservation of historic structures of St. Louis. These include the Landmarks Association of St. Louis (a private organization operating since the 1960s) and the Cultural Resource Office (a city government agency that maintains a list of St. Louis city landmarks). Another organization that works to preserve existing structures but pioneered in salvaging important elements prior to demolition or major remodels is the National Building Arts Center.

== Architects of St. Louis ==
- Harris Armstrong
- George I. Barnett
- Thomas P. Barnett
- William Bernoudy
- Charles B. Clarke
- Eames and Young
- William B. Ittner
- George Kessler, city planner
- Theodore Link
- John Mauran
- Gyo Obata of HOK

== Images ==
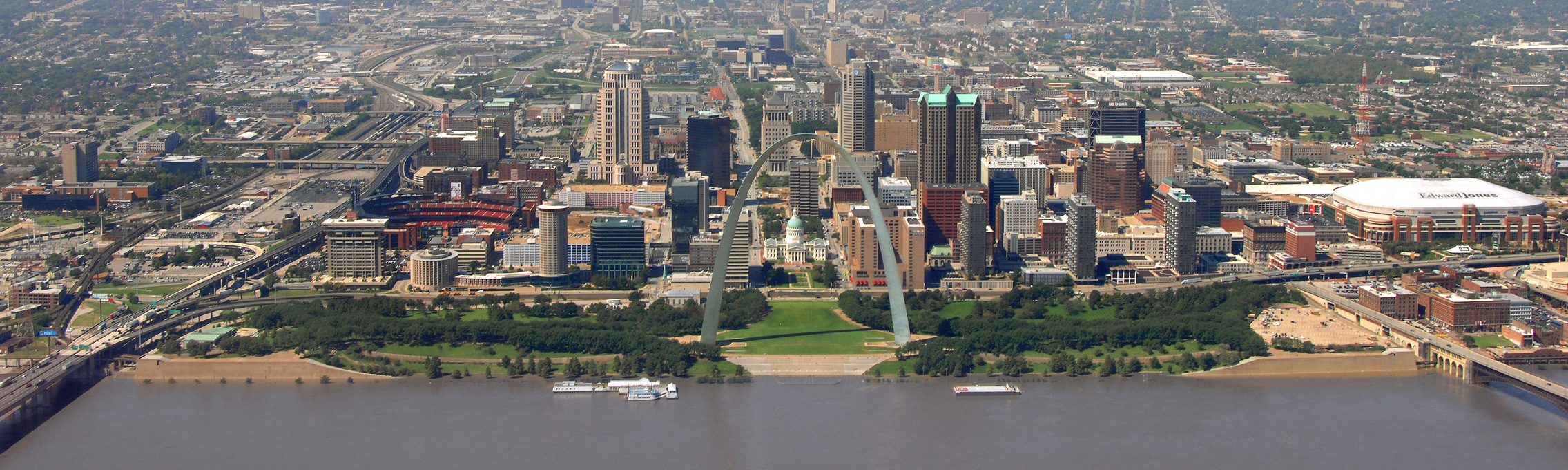
Downtown St. Louis skyline
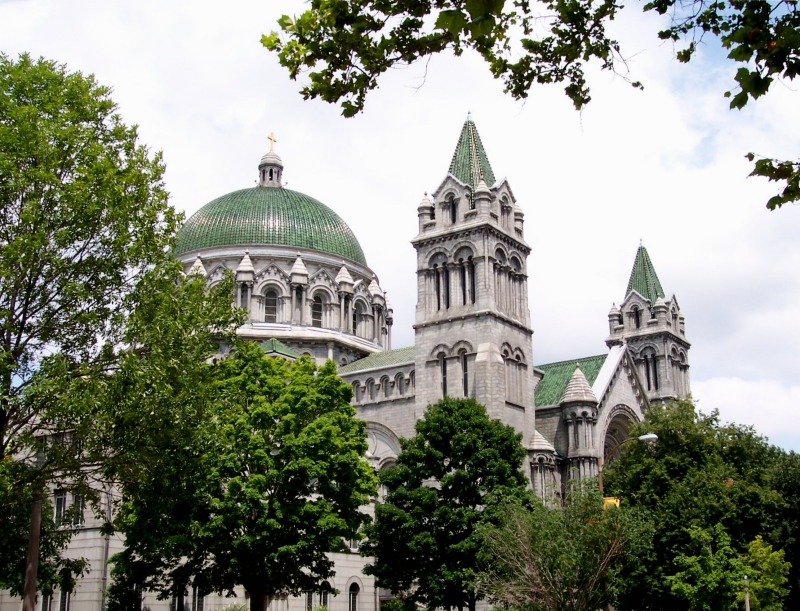
Cathedral Basilica of St. Louis

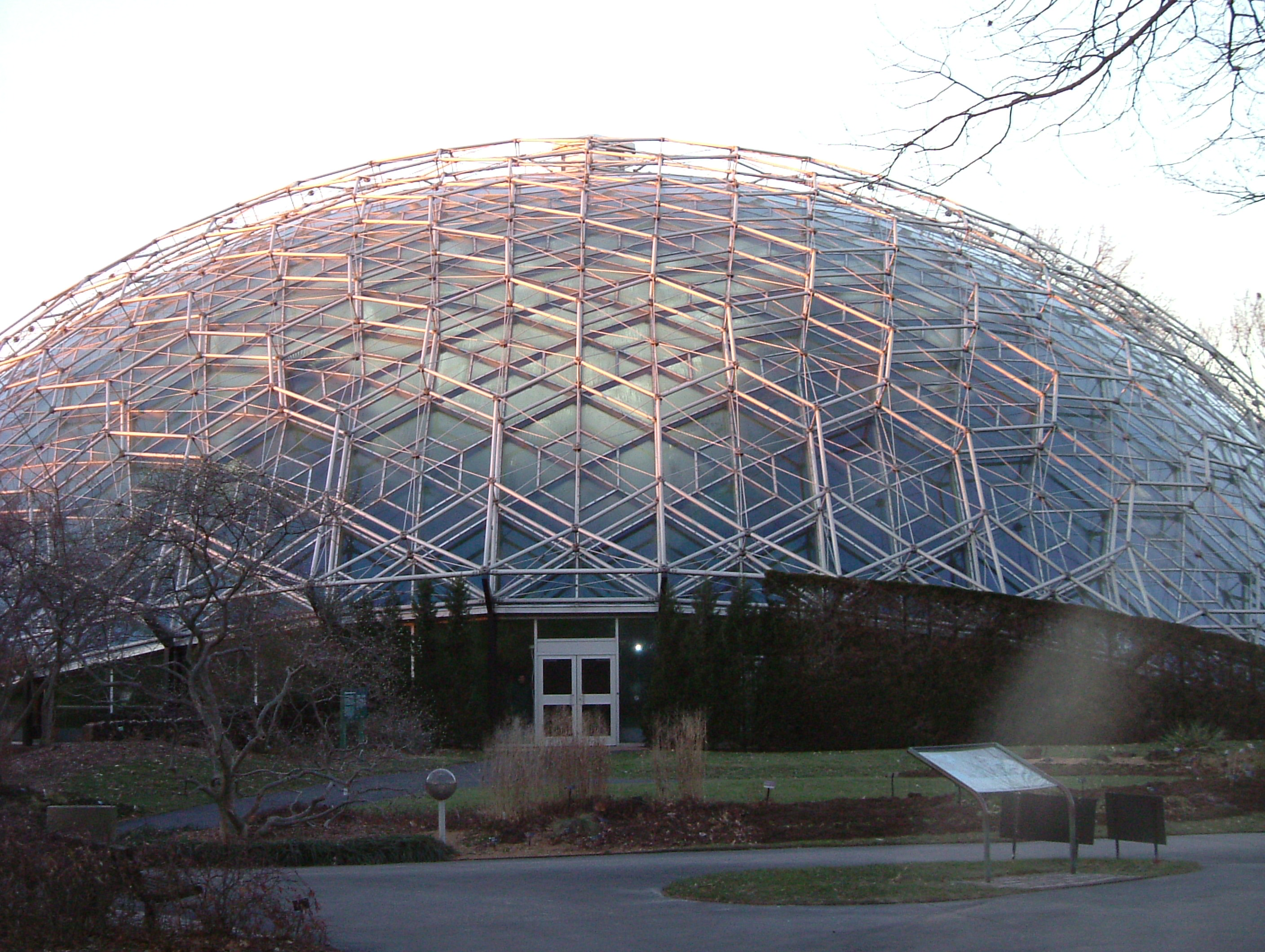
the Climatron

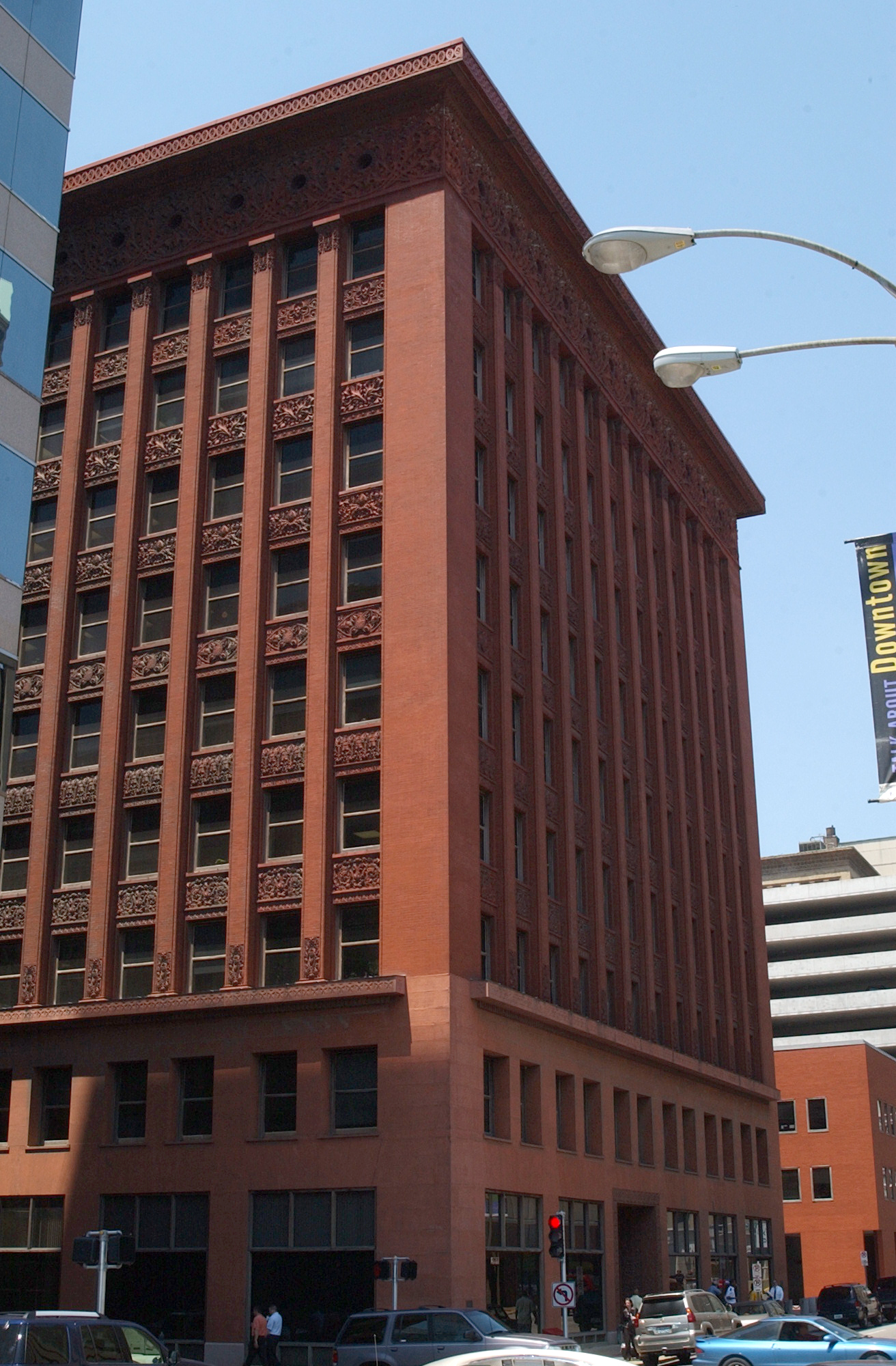
the Wainwright Building

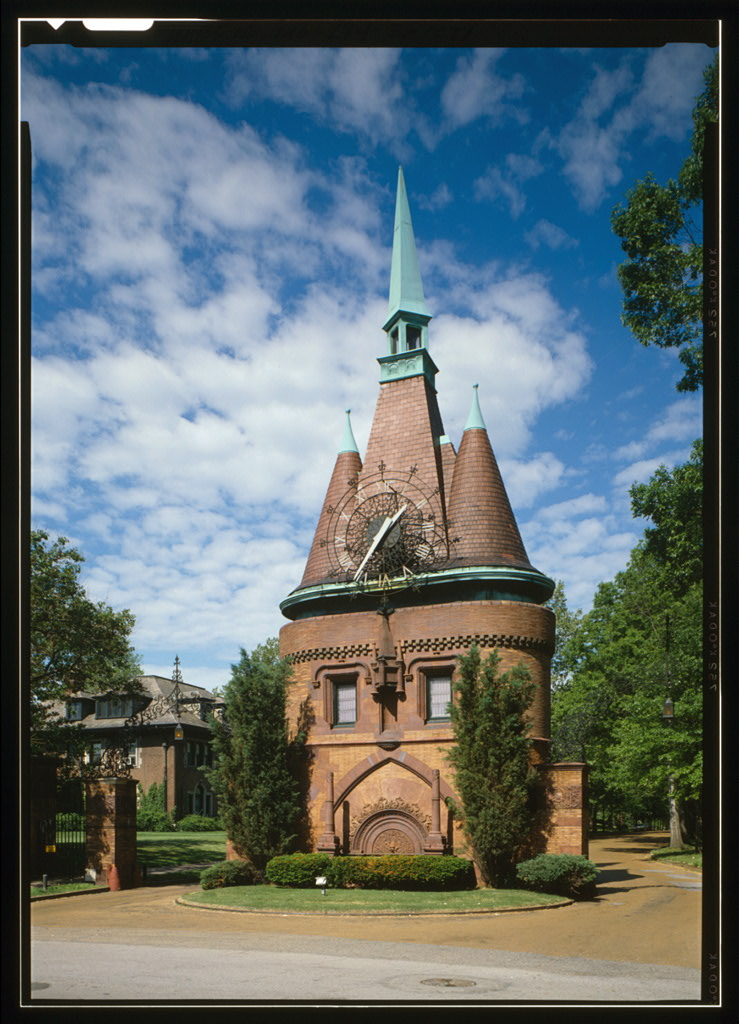
Washington Terrace (St. Louis)

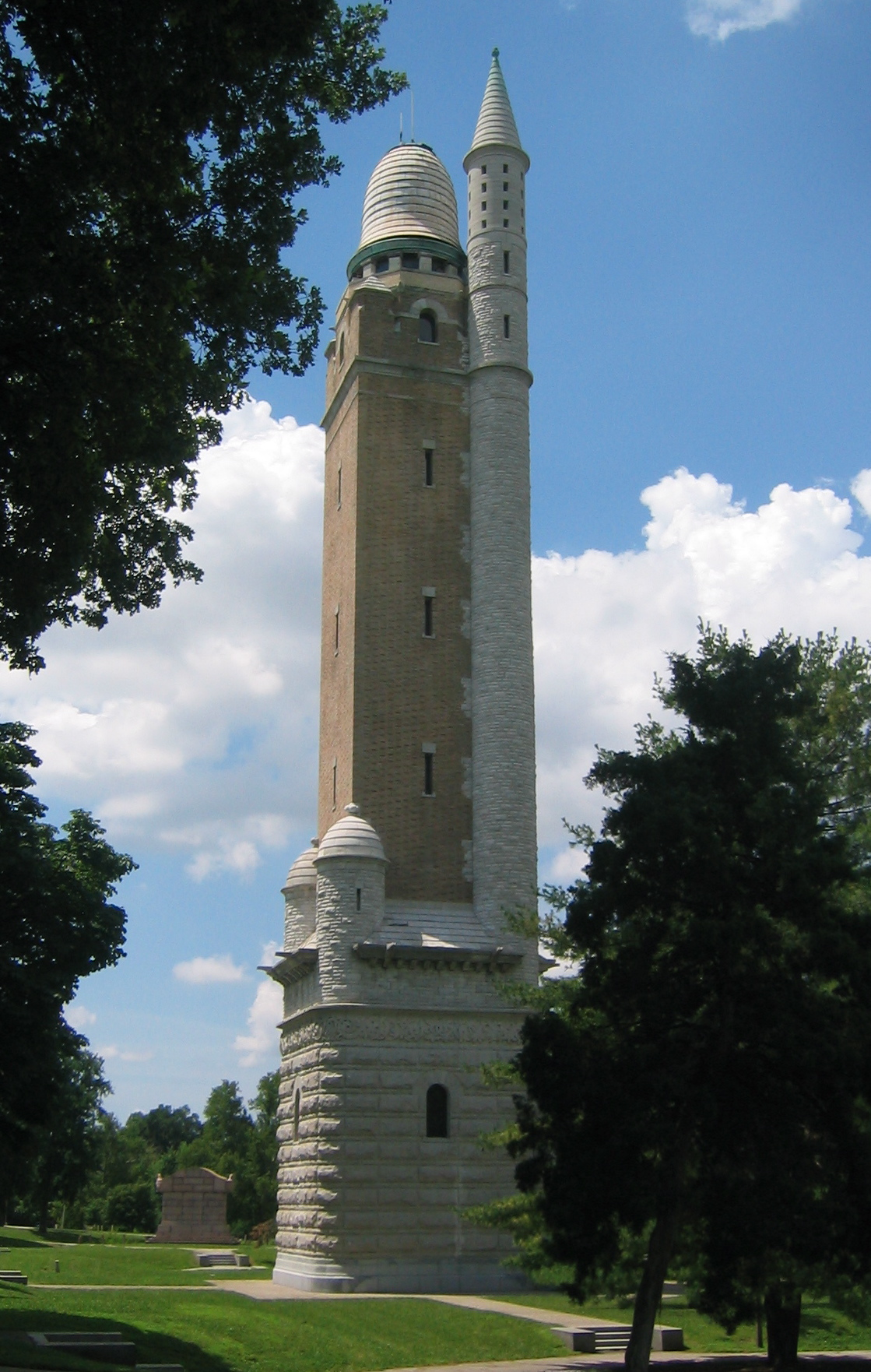
The Compton Hill Water Tower

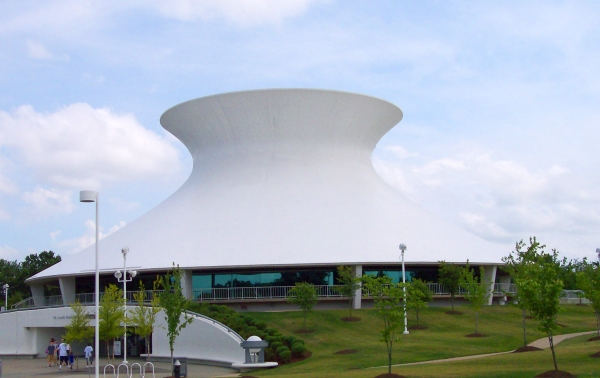
St. Louis Science Center

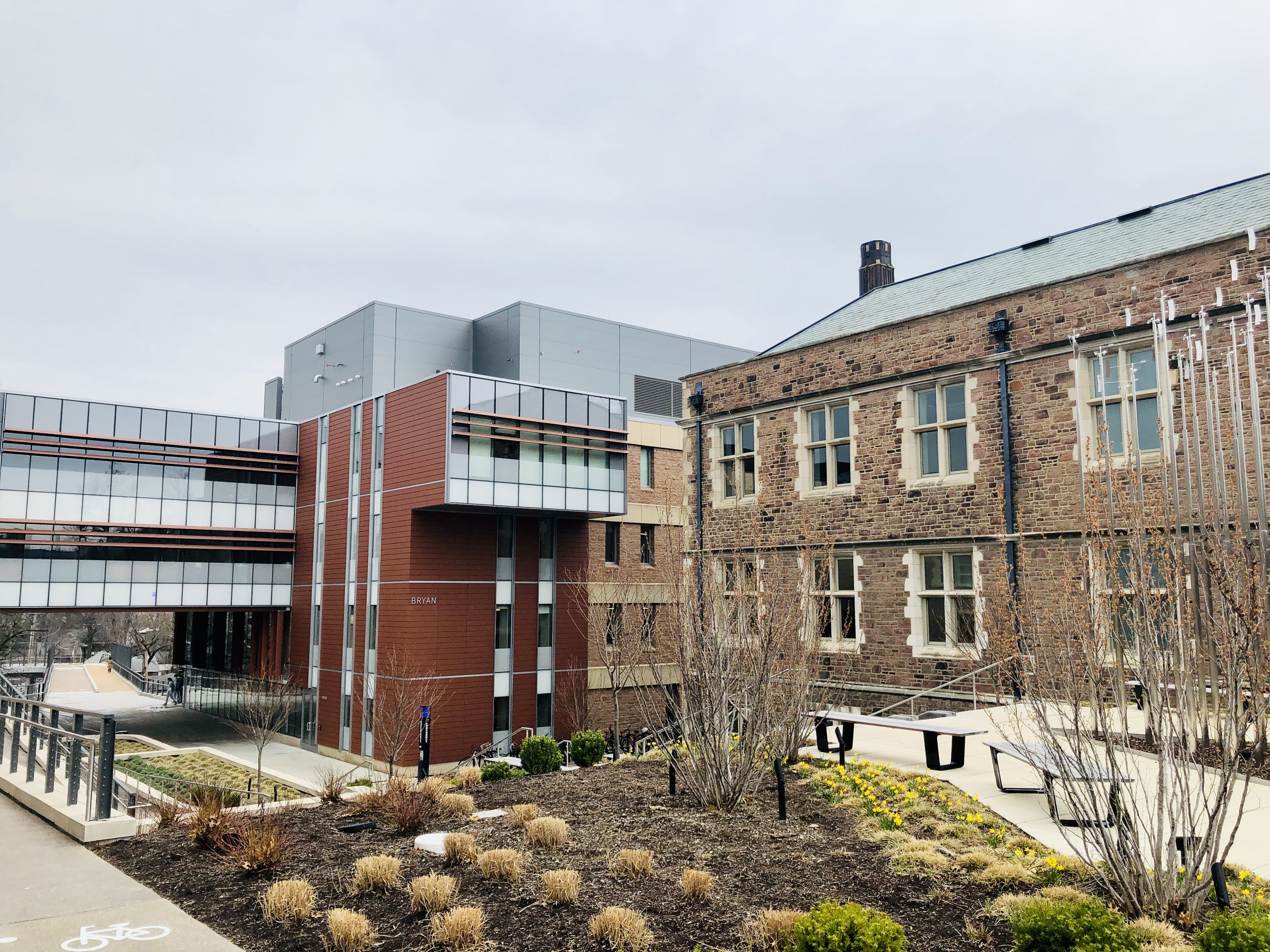
Bryan Hall in Washington University in St. Louis

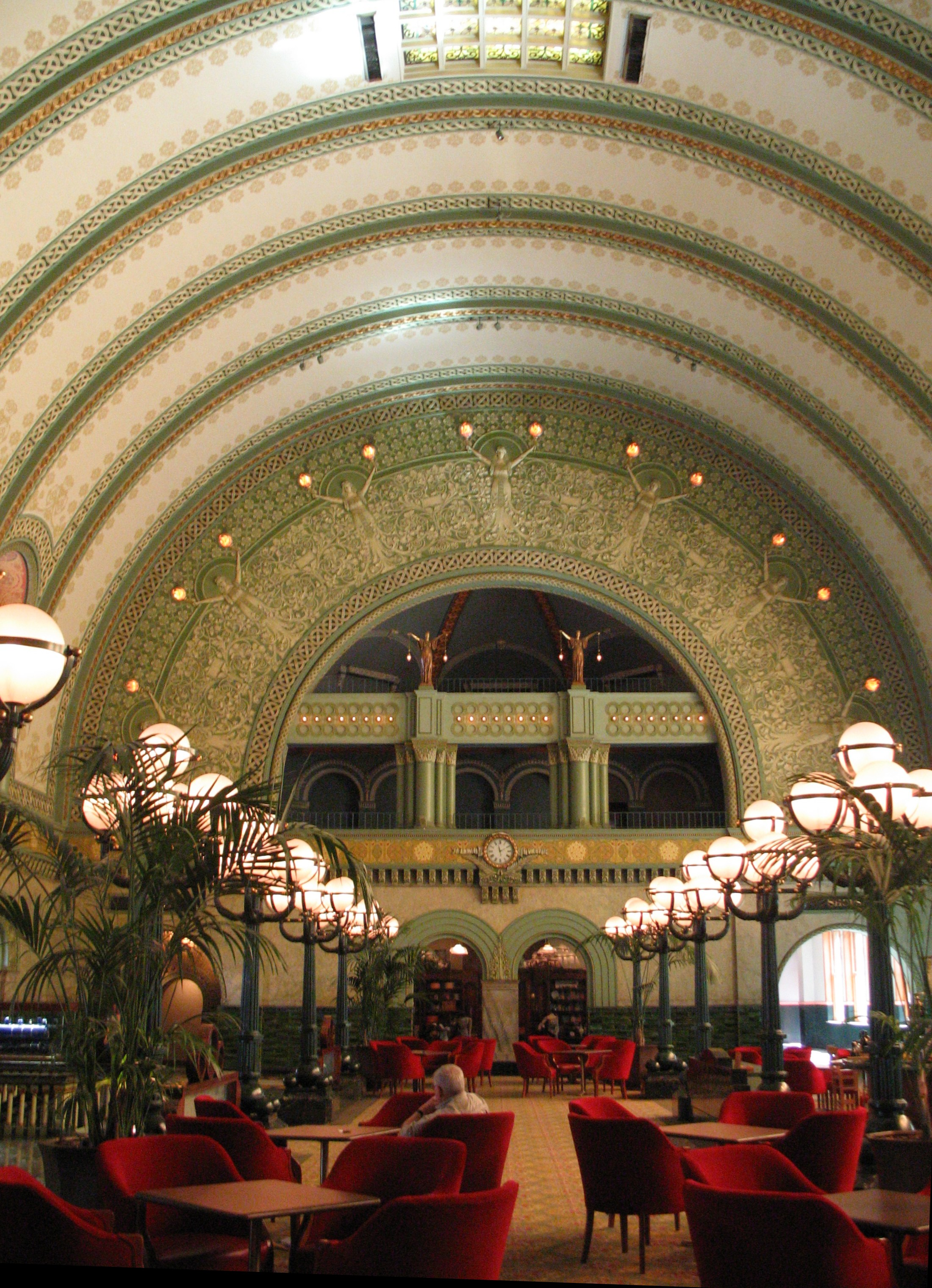
St. Louis Union Station Grand Hall

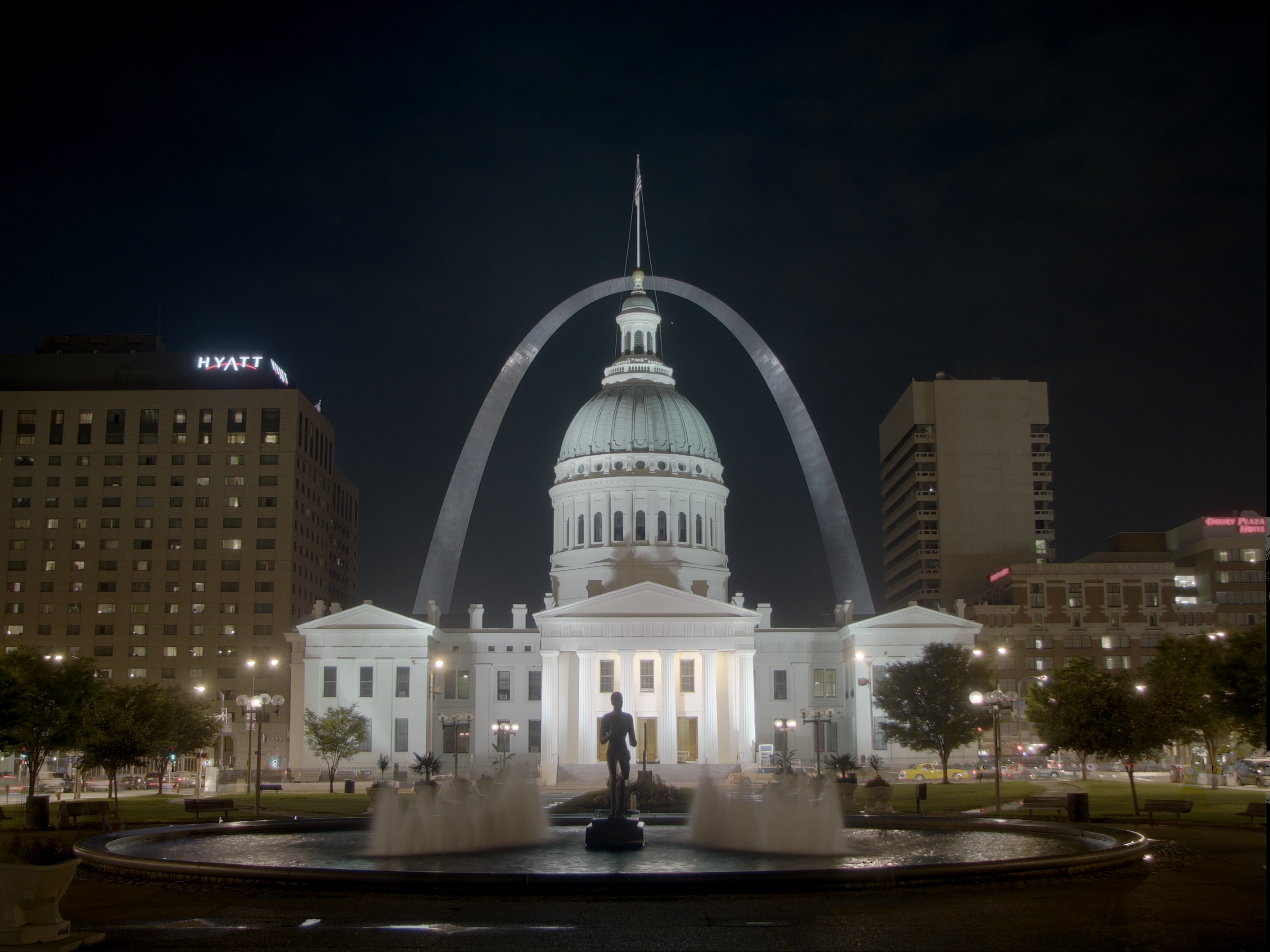
Gateway Arch from the mall

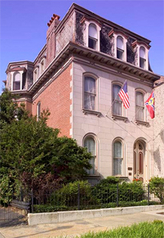
City House in Grand Center, Second Empire style townhouse

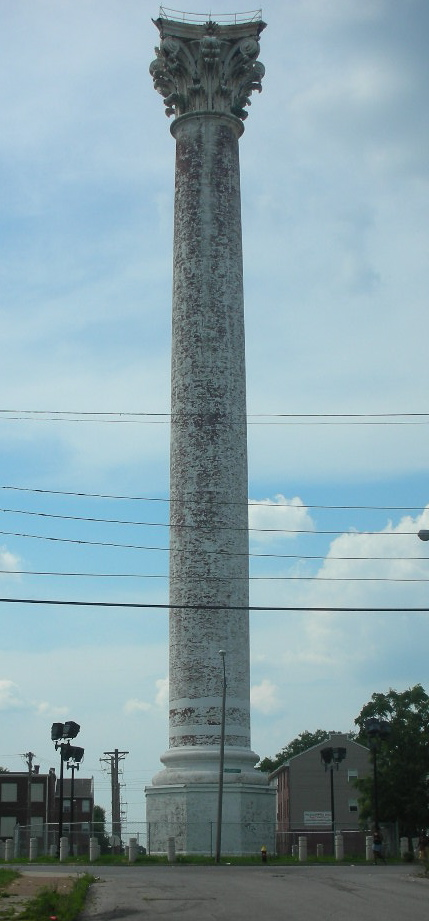
Old Grand Avenue Water Tower, 1871

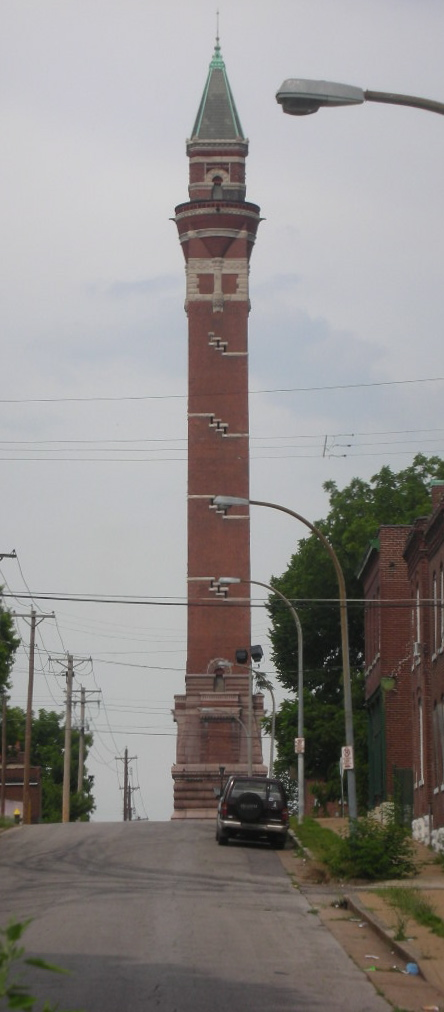
the Bissell Street Water Tower

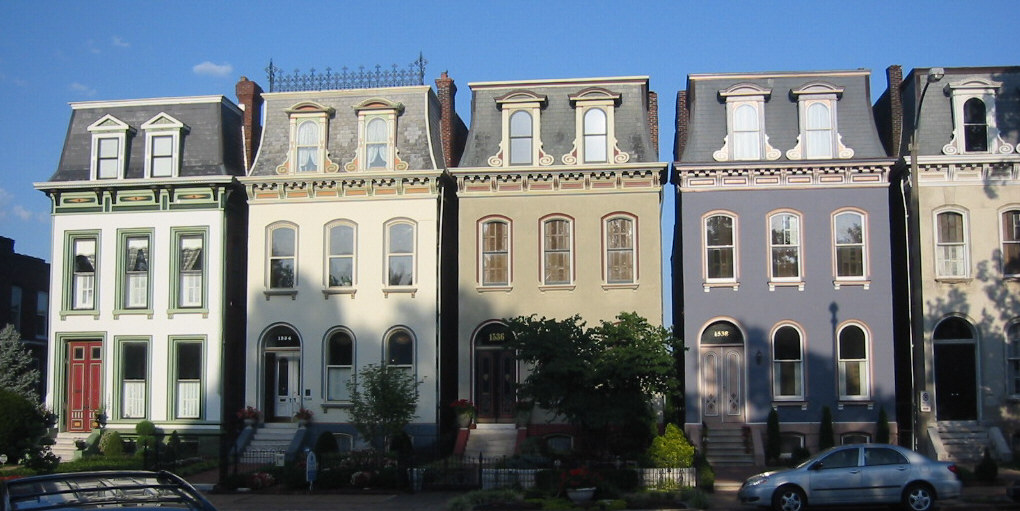
Rows of Lafayette Square townhouses surround the city's oldest public park

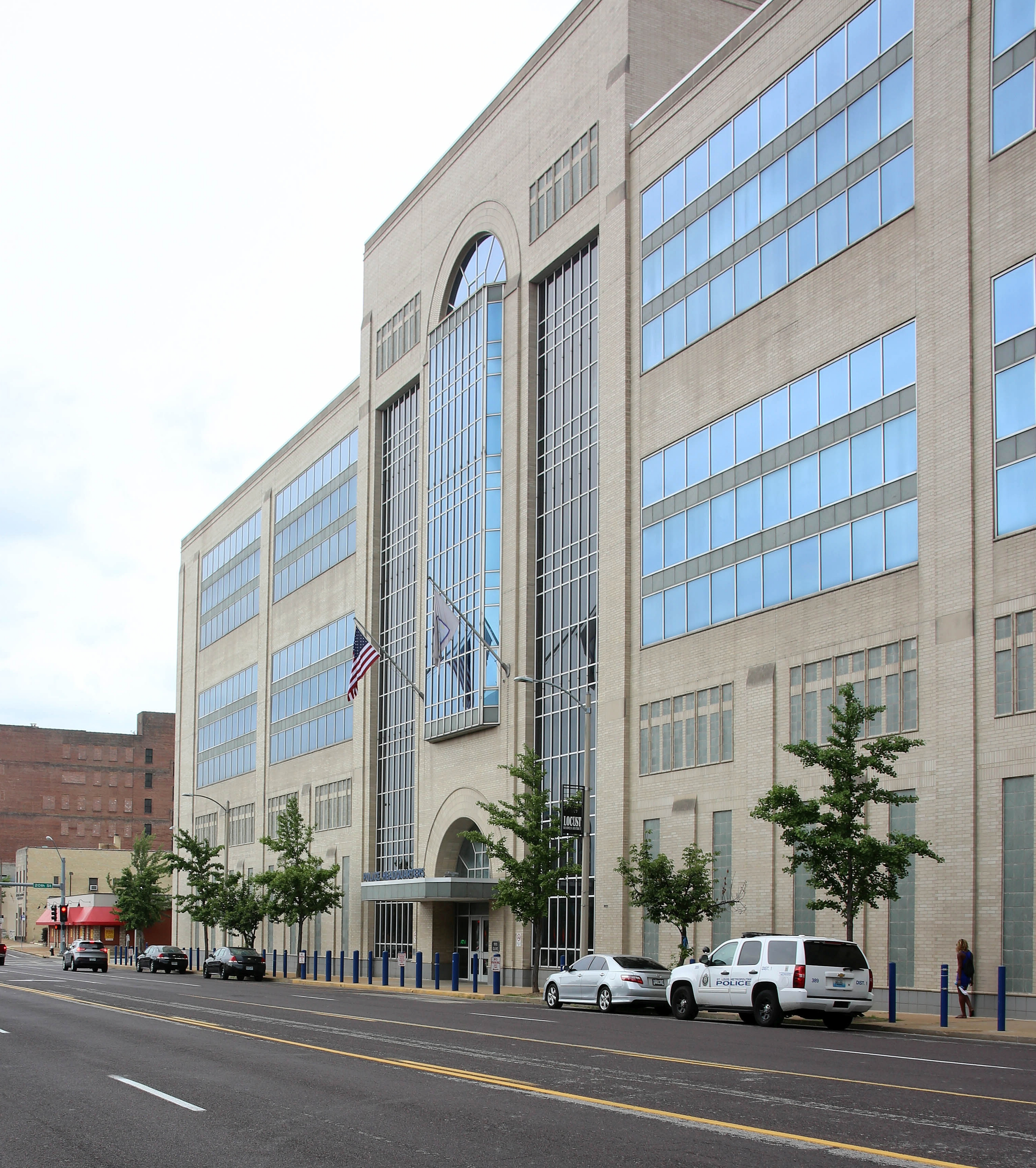
Picture of the Metropolitan Police Department, City of St. Louis Police Headquarters.

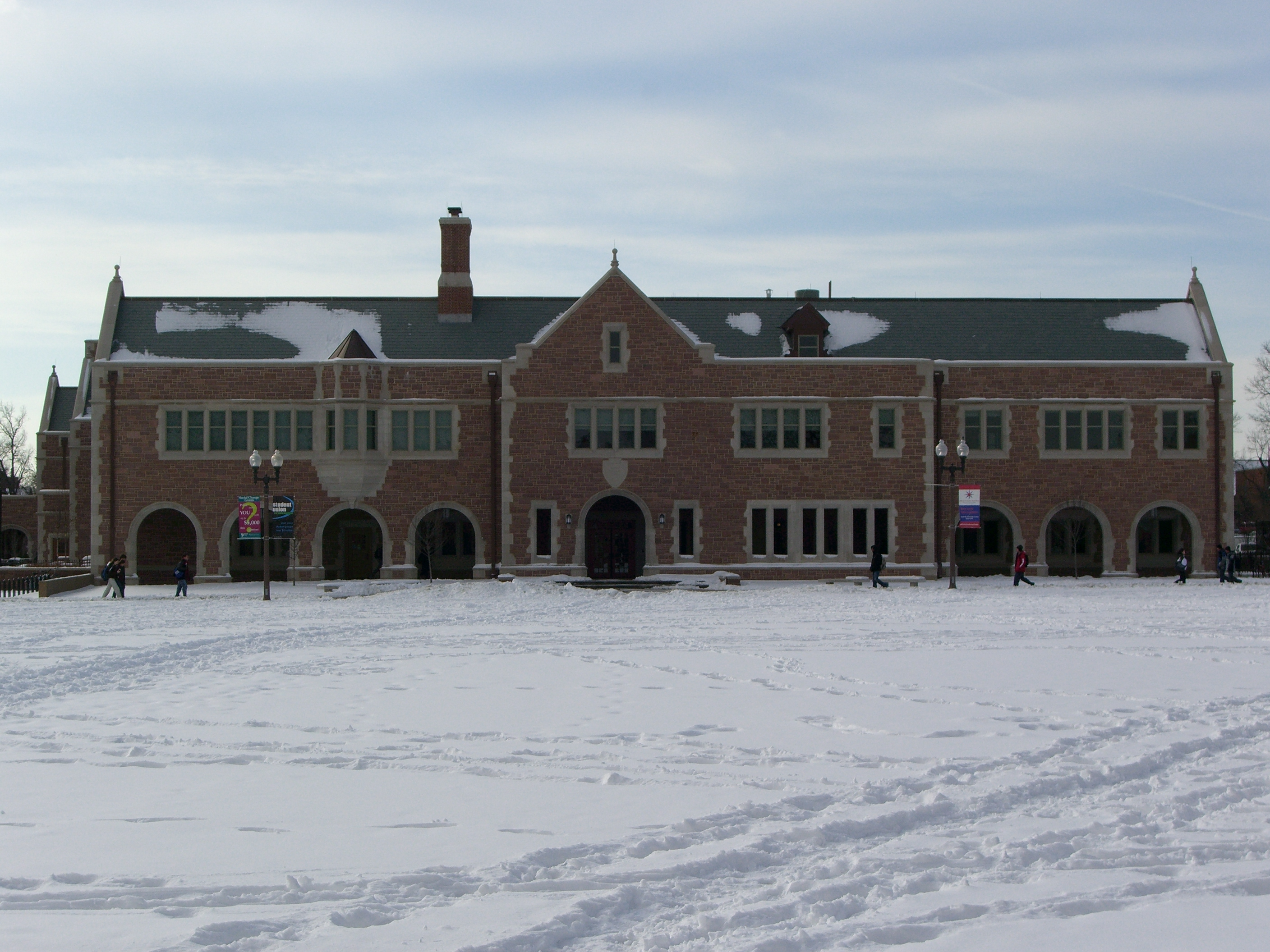
Danforth University Center in Washington University in St. Louis

== See also ==
- Caves of St. Louis
- History of St. Louis, Missouri
- List of public art in St. Louis
- National Register of Historic Places listings in St. Louis (city, A-L)
- National Register of Historic Places listings in St. Louis (city, M–Z)
- National Register of Historic Places listings in St. Louis County, Missouri
- Streetcars in St. Louis
