= Charles B. Clarke =

Charles B. Clarke may refer to:

- Charles Baron Clarke (1832–1906), British botanist
- Charles Bailey Clarke (1875–1944), mayor of Portland, Maine, 1918–1921
- Charles Boss Clarke (1836–1899), American architect
- Charles Benjamin Clarke (1844–1891), U.S. representative from Wisconsin

== See also ==
- Charles Barnett-Clarke, Dean of Cape Town, successor to Henry Alexander Douglas
- Charles Clarke (disambiguation)
