= William Clarke (cricketer, born 1846) =

English cricketer

Personal information
- Full name: William Benjamin Clarke
- Born: 5 November 1846; Old Basford, Nottinghamshire, England
- Died: 18 August 1902 (aged 55); Hyson Green, Nottinghamshire, England
- Batting: Right-handed
- Bowling: Right-arm medium-fast
- Relatives: Morris Clarke (brother); Charles Clarke (son)

Domestic team information
- Years: Team
- 1874–1876: Nottinghamshire
- 1880–1884: Middlesex

Career statistics
Competition	First-class
Matches	39
Runs scored	409
Batting average	8.01
100s/50s	–
Top score	40
Balls bowled	5657
Wickets	101
Bowling average	17.23
5 wickets in innings	0
10 wickets in match	–
Best bowling	7/51
Catches/stumpings	38/–
- Source: CricketArchive, 26 January 2011

William Benjamin Clarke (5 November 1846 – 18 August 1902) was an English cricketer. He was a right-handed batsman who bowled right-arm medium-fast.

He and his wife Hannah had two daughters, Alice and Amelia, and two sons, William and Charles (who played three times for Sussex in 1902). Clarke died in Hyson Green, Nottingham, in 1902 aged 55.
