= The Ethical Society of St. Louis =

Ethical Society of the American Ethical Union and Humanist community

Coordinates: 38°38′24.8″N 90°21′15.8″W

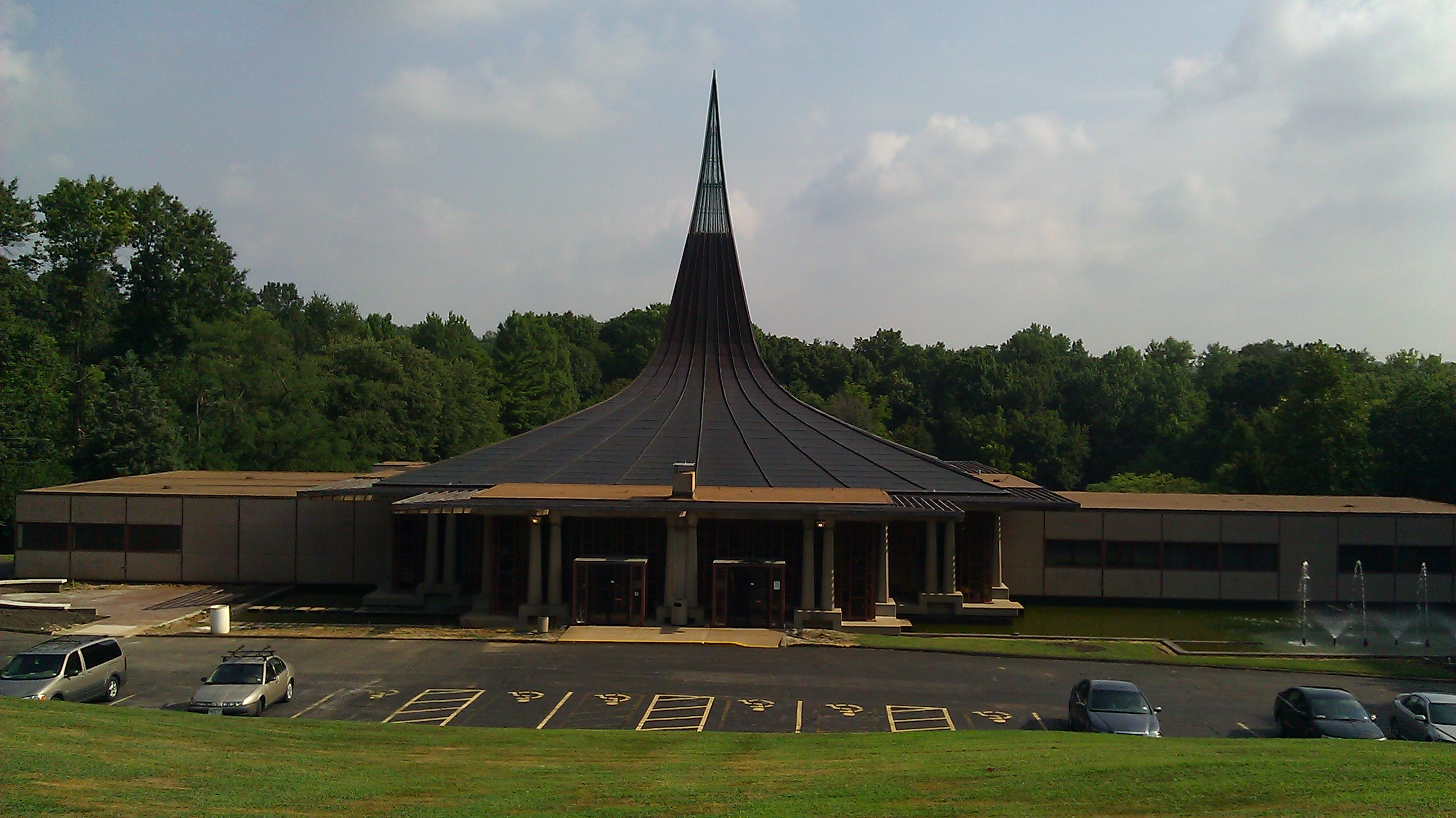
Ethical Society of St. Louis Building front view

The Ethical Society of St. Louis was founded in St. Louis, Missouri, in 1886 by Walter Sheldon.

== History ==
The Ethical Society of St. Louis was founded in 1886 with Walter Sheldon as its first leader. Sheldon had been selected by Felix Adler, founder of the Ethical Culture Movement in 1877, after working together at the New York Society. The first lectures were delivered at Memorial Hall in the Museum of Fine Arts.1887.

The architect of its distinctive Clayton Road building, completed in 1962, was Harris Armstrong.

The current leader of the Ethical Society of St. Louis is Dr. Jé Exodus Hooper.

== Education ==
Education was an important component of the Society. A children's Sunday School was opened the second year, 1887. The Self-Culture Hall Association, overseen by the Society's board of trustees, was opened in 1888. Focused on the working class it featured a reading room with books and papers, lectures, and training in domestic skills.

Today, the society offers Sunday school and nursery school for children and adult education classes on various topics including book of the month club, chorus, band, discussion on current events, ethical circles, ethical mindfulness meditation and other discussion groups. In addition, the society hosts other events such as art exhibitions, dance and music recitals, author meet-and-greets, and ceremonial celebrations. The society also campaigns for social justice, and has been a supporter of the Black Lives Matter movement.
