= Huntsville, Missouri =

City in Missouri, U.S.

- City
- City of Huntsville
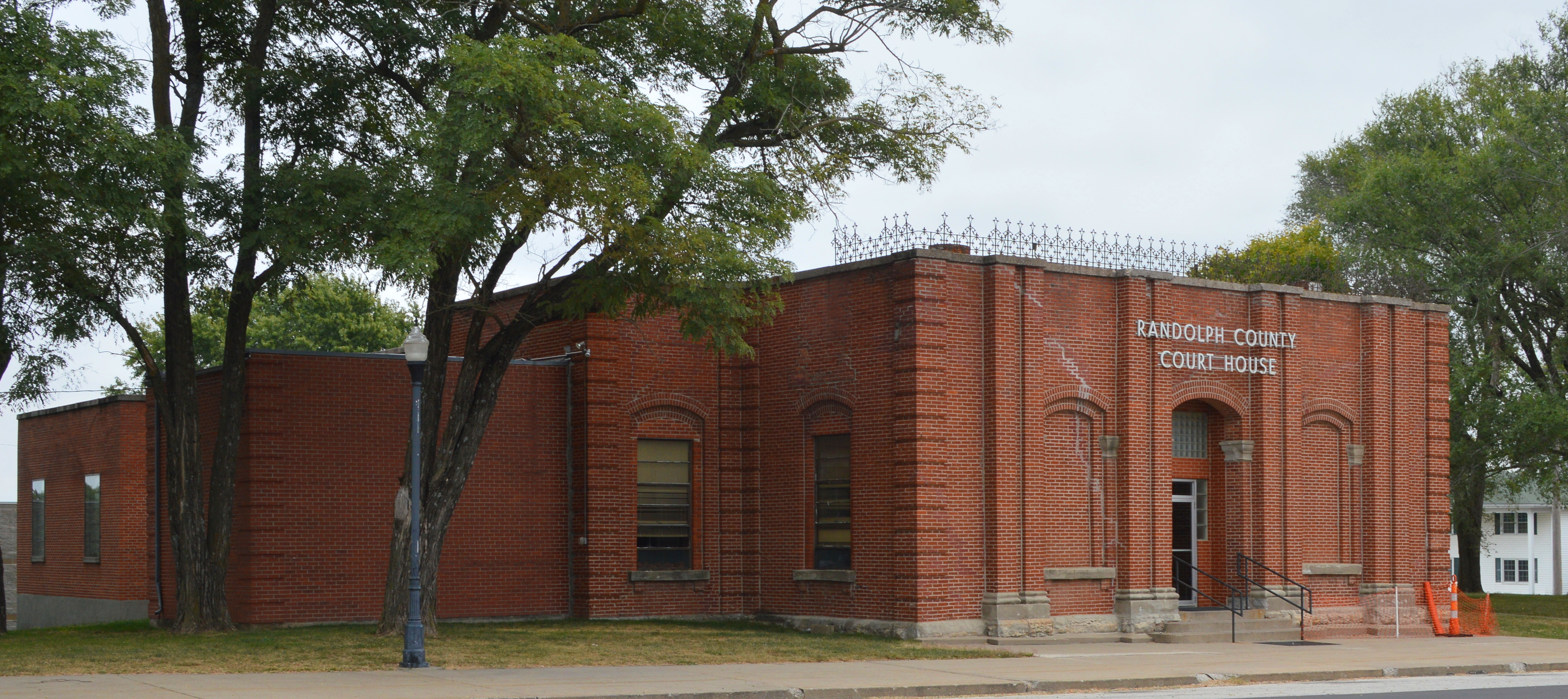

- Location of Huntsville, Missouri
- Coordinates: 39°26′11″N 92°32′38″W
- Country: United States
- State: Missouri
- County: Randolph

Area
  - Total: 2.32 sq mi (6.00 km^{2})
  - Land: 2.32 sq mi (6.00 km^{2})
  - Water: 0 sq mi (0.00 km^{2})
- Elevation: 758 ft (231 m)

Population (2020)
  - Total: 1,376
  - Estimate (2023): 1,371
  - Density: 594/sq mi (229.3/km^{2})
- Time zone: UTC-6 (Central (CST))
  - Summer (DST): UTC-5 (CDT)
- ZIP code: 65259
- Area code: 660
- FIPS code: 29-33886
- GNIS feature ID: 2394454

Huntsville is a city in and the county seat of Randolph County, Missouri, United States. The population was 1,376 at the 2020 census.

== History ==
Randolph County was organized 22.01.1829, and Huntsville was established as the county seat in 1831. Daniel Hunt, a Kentuckian, was the first settler of Huntsville, in honor of whom the town was named. He settled here between 1820 and 1821. He was soon followed by William Goggin, Gideon Wright and Henry Winburn, also from Kentucky. William Goggins established a mill here, the first in the county. They entered the land from the government upon which Huntsville is located and donated 50 acres for a town site, giving 12 1/2 acres each forming an exact square, the dome of the court house being the center.

The Randolph County Courthouse houses the following county governmental offices: Assessor, Randolph County Commissioners, Collector, Recorder of Deeds, Treasurer and County Clerk. The first courthouse was built in the center of the public square at the precise meeting point of the four parcels of land; it was completed by June 13, 1831. It was razed in either 1858 or 1859. The next courthouse stood on the same site between 1858 and 1882, being expanded and remodeled in 1877 by architect Charles B. Clarke. On August 12, 1882, a fire consumed the courthouse. The third courthouse was completed in April 1884. Another fire occurred in July 1955. The current courthouse stands in the same location as the original court building.

In 1838, the Potawatomi Indians passed near Huntsville on the Trail of Death. A marker was dedicated on September 11, 1997, with Potawatomi descendants present. It reads as thus: "On October 17 and 18, 1838, about 850 Potawatomi Indians camped near Huntsville, on their way from northern Indiana to Kansas; a forced march accompanied by soldiers. Having travelled 13 miles in cold, rain, a flooded camp caused them to stay a second day." The marker is located on the front lawn of the Randolph County Courthouse.

The Huntsville Historical Society was chartered on June 19, 1973. The Society and friends support and maintain a Museum which opened in 1975 in the old Westlake Hardware store in downtown Huntsville on Main Street. The Museum is available to the public with the mission to collect, preserve and disseminate historical information about Huntsville. The Society supports other community projects as well.

Huntsville is home to both the Westran Elementary School and Westran High School. The Westran High School is home to the Westran Hornets and Lady Hornets. Students are offered participation in football, basketball, softball, baseball, track, golf, cheerleading, as well as other sports.

The Huntsville Lincoln School was built on Randolph Street and provided education for African-American children from first to eighth grade. Later the ninth and tenth grades were added. About 1935, pupils were transported to the Moberly Lincoln High School for the eleventh and twelfth grades. This continued until the schools were integrated in the early 1960s.

During the mid-19th century, Huntsville was also the home to Mount Pleasant College. A charter was granted and the cornerstone was laid and work began on Mount Pleasant College in 1855. The building was completed in 1857. The college stood in existence for 26 years until it burned to the ground on July 15, 1882.

Huntsville was well known for its commerce, producing salt, coal, hemp rope, and tobacco.

In June, 2000 the Randolph County jail, located in Huntsville, was the scene of a shooting as part of an attempted escape. The jail supervisor and a guard were both killed in the attack.

== Geography ==
According to the United States Census Bureau, the city has a total area of 2.39 square miles (6.19 km^{2}), all land.

== Demographics ==
Historical population
| Census | Pop. | Note | %± |
|---|---|---|---|
| 1880 | 1,527 | | — |
| 1890 | 1,836 | | 20.2% |
| 1900 | 1,805 | | −1.7% |
| 1910 | 2,247 | | 24.5% |
| 1920 | 2,126 | | −5.4% |
| 1930 | 1,897 | | −10.8% |
| 1940 | 1,739 | | −8.3% |
| 1950 | 1,520 | | −12.6% |
| 1960 | 1,526 | | 0.4% |
| 1970 | 1,442 | | −5.5% |
| 1980 | 1,657 | | 14.9% |
| 1990 | 1,567 | | −5.4% |
| 2000 | 1,553 | | −0.9% |
| 2010 | 1,564 | | 0.7% |
| 2020 | 1,376 | | −12.0% |
U.S. Decennial Census

=== 2010 census ===
As of the census of 2010, there were 1,564 people, 590 households, and 396 families living in the city. The population density was 654.4 inhabitants per square mile (252.7/km^{2}). There were 690 housing units at an average density of 288.7 per square mile (111.5/km^{2}). The racial makeup of the city was 92.6% White, 5.2% African American, 0.1% Native American, 0.3% Asian, 0.2% from other races, and 1.6% from two or more races. Hispanic or Latino of any race were 1.2% of the population.

There were 590 households, of which 35.9% had children under the age of 18 living with them, 46.9% were married couples living together, 13.7% had a female householder with no husband present, 6.4% had a male householder with no wife present, and 32.9% were non-families. 29.0% of all households were made up of individuals, and 12.3% had someone living alone who was 65 years of age or older. The average household size was 2.46 and the average family size was 2.94.

The median age in the city was 37.3 years. 24.9% of residents were under the age of 18; 8.6% were between the ages of 18 and 24; 26.6% were from 25 to 44; 25.9% were from 45 to 64; and 14% were 65 years of age or older. The gender makeup of the city was 51.5% male and 48.5% female.

=== 2000 census ===
As of the census of 2000, there were 1,553 people, 595 households, and 402 families living in the city. The population density was 656.1 inhabitants per square mile (253.3/km^{2}). There were 684 housing units at an average density of 289.0 per square mile (111.6/km^{2}). The racial makeup of the city was 91.50% White, 6.12% African American, 0.58% Native American, 0.06% Asian, 0.06% from other races, and 1.67% from two or more races. Hispanic or Latino of any race were 0.64% of the population.

There were 595 households, out of which 36.0% had children under the age of 18 living with them, 52.6% were married couples living together, 10.9% had a female householder with no husband present, and 32.4% were non-families. 28.6% of all households were made up of individuals, and 13.6% had someone living alone who was 65 years of age or older. The average household size was 2.51 and the average family size was 3.09.

In the city, the population was spread out, with 27.4% under the age of 18, 9.2% from 18 to 24, 27.4% from 25 to 44, 21.5% from 45 to 64, and 14.4% who were 65 years of age or older. The median age was 34 years. For every 100 females, there were 97.6 males. For every 100 females age 18 and over, there were 90.4 males.

The median income for a household in the city was $30,524, and the median income for a family was $38,043. Males had a median income of $25,000 versus $19,423 for females. The per capita income for the city was $13,939. About 5.9% of families and 9.0% of the population were below the poverty line, including 12.4% of those under age 18 and 10.9% of those age 65 or over.

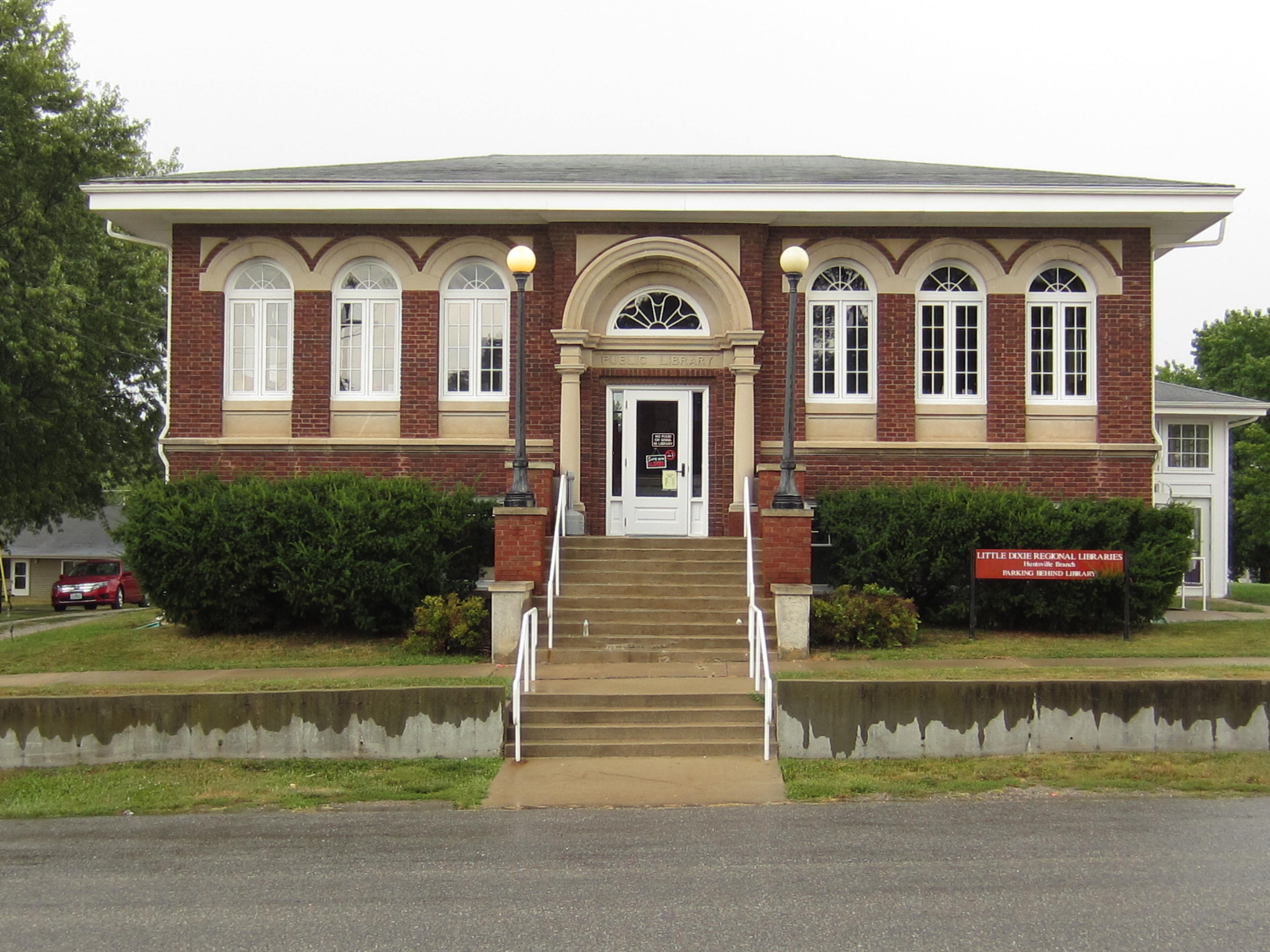
Little Dixie Regional Library, a Carnegie Library

== Education ==
Public education in Huntsville is administered by Westran R-I School District, which operates one elementary school, one middle school, and Westran High School.

Huntsville has a public library, a branch of the Little Dixie Regional Libraries.

== Notable people ==
- William T. Anderson - Confederate guerrilla leader during the American Civil War. Anderson spent his boyhood in Huntsville.
- George W. P. Hunt - First governor of Arizona.

== See also ==
- List of cities in Missouri
