= Charles Clerke (disambiguation) =

Charles Clerke was a royal Navy officer.

Charles Clerke may also refer to:

- Charles Clerke (footballer) (1857–1944), English amateur footballer who scored the only goal in the 1879 FA Cup Final
- Charles Carr Clerke (1798–1877), Archdeacon of Oxford

== See also ==
- Charles Clarke (disambiguation)
