= Harris Armstrong =

American architect

- Born: April 6, 1899; Edwardsville, Illinois
- Died: December 15, 1973 (aged 74); St. Louis, Missouri
- Occupation: Architect

Harris Armstrong (April 6, 1899 – December 15, 1973) was an American regional modernist architect, considered the dean of modernists active in St. Louis, Missouri.

After working in the office of Raymond Hood in the 1930s, Armstrong returned to St. Louis and designed many civic landmarks, including the 1935 Shanley Building, awarded a silver medal at the 1937 Paris Exposition of Art and Technology; the 1938 Grant Medical Clinic; the 1946 "Magic Chef" building in collaboration with Isamu Noguchi; and the distinctive 1962 Ethical Society building.

He was one of five finalists in the design competition for the Gateway Arch National Park (then known as the Jefferson National Expansion Memorial). Armstrong retired in 1969.

He was the father of the actor Todd Armstrong.
