= Century Building (St. Louis) =

- Century Building and Syndicate Trust Building
- U.S. National Register of Historic Places
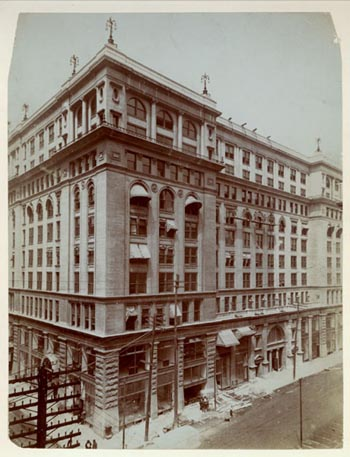
- Century Building, 1897
- Location: St. Louis, Missouri
- Coordinates: 38.6295°N 90.1939°W
- NRHP reference No.: 02001054
- Added to NRHP: October 16, 2002

The Century Building, designed by Raeder, Coffin, and Crocker and completed in 1896, was a 10-story Classical Revival historic building in downtown St. Louis, Missouri that was used for offices, retail, and a 1600-seat theatre. It was listed on the National Register of Historic Places on October 16, 2002.

In 1999, St. Louis planners and historic preservationists working as an advisory committee released their Downtown Plan, which called for the preservation and adaptive reuse of the Century Building. The Slay administration rejected the recommendations of the committee, and announced that a development team had been chosen (DESCO and DFC, Inc) to renovate the nearby historic Old Post Office (OPO) and to demolish the Century Building in order to build a parking deck to service the OPO. City officials made the argument that tenants for the renovated OPO building demanded parking within view of their new offices.

St. Louis' preservationists' next line of defense was the National Trust for Historic Preservation (NTHP). Contacted in 2001, NTHP was initially supportive of preservation efforts for the building. Midwest Trust Director Royce Yeater recommended that an alternative site be chosen for the proposed parking deck, noting that there were "10 underused parking facilities in the 10 blocks surrounding the OPO."

In 2004, the NTHP changed its stance concerning the project. The NTHP would now provide $6.9 million in gap financing in the form of tax credits for the OPO renovations and parking deck. NTHP refused to stop the demolition of the Century Building, and was now supporting the very project that preservationists were desperately trying to stop.

Preservationists around the country signed an on-line petition in a concerted effort to save the Century Building. Richard Moe, president of the NTHP, defended his organization's actions by stating that the demolition of the Century Building was key to revitalizing the area around the OPO.

The Landmarks Association filed a final lawsuit on October 19, 2004, requesting a temporary restraining order to halt demolition. Their request was ultimately denied, and demolition of the building commenced shortly thereafter.

Many historic preservationists call the loss of the Century Building a major sacrifice for Downtown St. Louis. Some have also said the NTHP drifted from its primary mission of historic preservation by supporting the developers of the OPO project. Other professionals take the side that certain sacrifices need to be made in order to improve neighborhoods as whole, and the Century Building was one of these sacrifices. It is generally agreed, however, that the Century Building was an important part of St. Louis' architectural history, and could have been transformed into an asset for Downtown St. Louis had the building been saved.

Beams and parts of its facade were recovered by the National Building Arts Center. They're currently stored at the foundation's Sauget foundry.
