= Charlie Clarke (footballer, born 1879) =

Australian rules footballer

Personal information
- Full name: Charles Aleck Roadknight Clarke
- Born: 9 December 1879; St Kilda, Victoria
- Died: 15 October 1946 (aged 66); Kew East, Victoria

Playing career^{1}
Years	Club	Games (Goals)
1900–02	St Kilda	17 (5)
- ^{1} Playing statistics correct to the end of 1902.

Charles Aleck Roadknight Clarke (9 December 1879 – 15 October 1946) was an Australian rules footballer who played with St Kilda in the Victorian Football League (VFL).
