= Charles Clark (publisher, born 1933) =

British publisher and lawyer

Charles David Lawson Clark (12 June 1933 – 6 October 2006) was a British publisher and lawyer, who was an authority on the law of copyright.

== Life ==
Clark was born in London and studied at Edinburgh Academy before reading law at Jesus College, Oxford. He was an editor for the legal publishers Sweet and Maxwell and was then called to the bar by Inner Temple in 1960. He then worked for Penguin Books, commissioning various titles on the "Pelican" list and the New Penguin Shakespeare, and initiating the Law, Psychology and Psychiatry lists. He was appointed managing director of Penguin Education in 1966, and also of Allen Lane/Penguin Press (which printed hardback books) in 1967. In 1972 he moved to Hutchinson to succeed Sir Robert Lusty as managing director of the publishing group], with authors including Frederick Forsyth and Anthony Burgess. From 1980 to 1984 he was chief executive of Hutchinson Ltd, which included the publishing operation and the printing company. Clark was actively involved with the charity MIND from the late 1960s until his death; he was chairman from 1976 to 1979. He also founded Bookrest, the money-raising arm of the Book Trade Benevolent Society.

He assisted the Publishers' Association with its submissions to the Whitford committee on copyright law, which led to the Copyright, Designs and Patents Act 1988. He became legal advisor to the Association after leaving Hutchinson in 1984, working with copyright issues at national and international level (including the consequences of European legislation such as extending copyright from 50 to 70 years after the year in which the author died, and of membership of the World Trade Organization. He was concerned to ensure that there was a fair system of remuneration for authors and for publishers. He helped establish the Copyright Licensing Agency in 1983, acting as its legal adviser until 1999. He also worked for the Federation of European Publishers and International Publishers Copyright Council on copyright matters, and was general editor of Publishing Agreements: a Book of Precedents (1980). Other work was published under the title The Answer to the Machine is in the Machine and Other Collected Writings (2005). His knowledge of copyright law led to him being described by Mark Le Fanu, of the Society of Authors, as "the peer of contracts experts, Lord Clark of Copyright".
