= Charles Clark (publisher, born 1806) =

English farmer and printer (1806–1880)

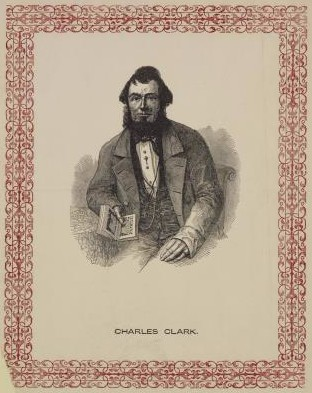
Charles Clark

Charles Clark (1806–1880) was an English publisher, farmer and satirist.

== Life ==
He was the son of Robert Clark (died 1850), a farmer, and his wife Mary Ann Pond (died 1849), and was born at Heybridge, Maldon in Essex. He attended a school in Witham run by James Salisbury Dunn.

Clark started farming with his father, and they moved to Great Totham in 1823. He was writing poetry by the mid-1820s, and set up a press by 1828. George William Johnson who lived in the village published his History of the Parish of Great Totham (1834) with Clark. Most of what he printed were parodies and songs, generally "exceedingly silly and indecent" according to Gordon Goodwin in the Dictionary of National Biography. Clark imitated the poet Thomas Hood, and in one case was threatened with legal action. That was caused by a poem of 1839, A Doctor's 'Do' ings, on the marriage of Dr Henry Dixon.

An associate of Clark was the printer Philip Henry Youngman (fl.1826–1851), in Witham and Maldon. Other productions from Clark's private press were reprints of tracts and old works, including one by the Tudor agricultural writer Thomas Tusser. Clark was given support in this direction by John Russell Smith.

In later life Clark moved back to Heybridge, and in the 1860s became reclusive. He died unmarried on 21 March 1880, and his press and library were auctioned.

== Bibliography ==
He wrote pseudonymously the following:

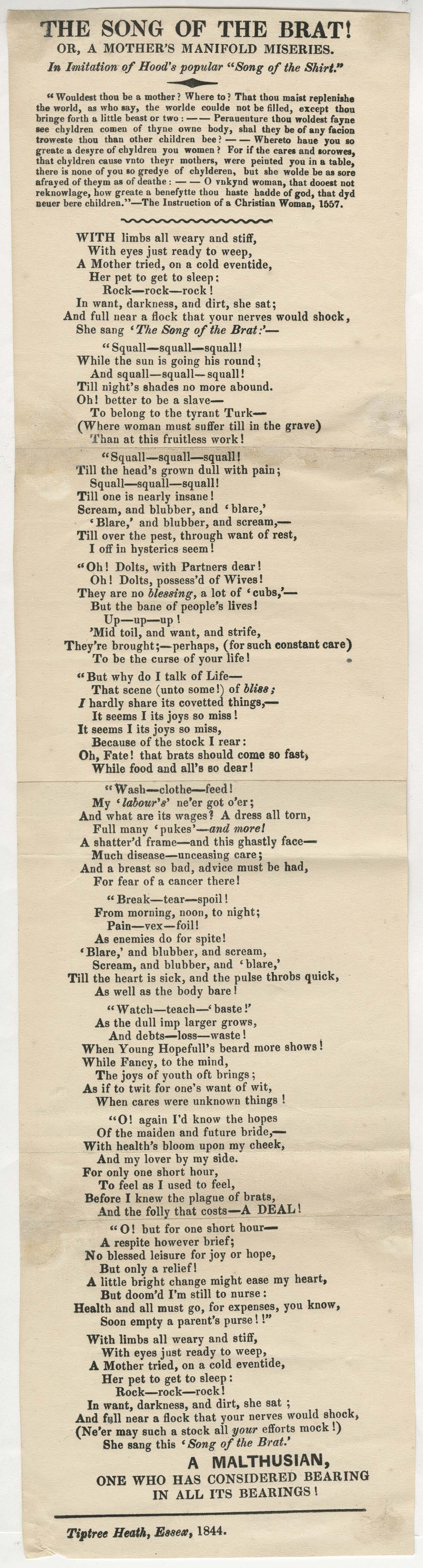
1 sheet ; 40 x 11 cm "The Song of the Brat! : or, A Mother's Manifold Miseries" by Clark, Charles, 1806–1880, printer

As C. C.:

- The Song of the Brat
- The Old Bachelor
- Tiptree Races

As Chilly Charley or Snarley Charley:

- Bills, Ills and Chills
- Bagging and Bragging

As Doggerel Drydog:

- September, or Sport on Sporting
- Oh No! We'll Never Welcome Them!

As Charles William Duckett:

- Stanzas from 'The Lay of the Brokenhearts'

As Thomas Hood the Younger:

- Epsom Races

As Pe-Gs-Us:

- The Balloons

As Quintin Queeerfellow:

- A Doctor's 'Do' ings

== See also ==
- McGill University Library has digitized 85 examples of his work from their William Colgate History of Printing Collection that can be accessed through their library catalogue and the Internet Archive.
