= Chuck Clark (ice hockey) =

British-born Canadian ice hockey player

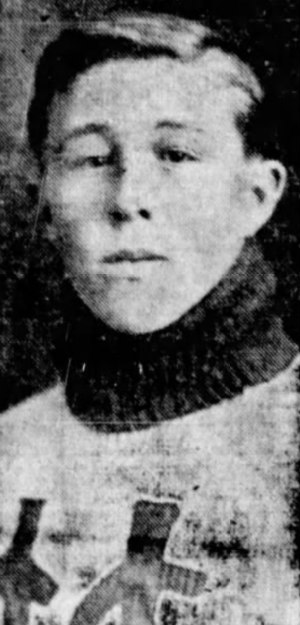
- Clark c. 1912
- Born: October 16, 1891; Sevenoaks, England, United Kingdom
- Died: February 8, 1970 (aged 78); Vancouver, British Columbia
- Height: 5 ft 6 in (168 cm)
- Weight: 160 lb (73 kg; 11 st 6 lb)
- Position: Goaltender
- Played for: Vancouver Millionaires
- Playing career: 1910–1914

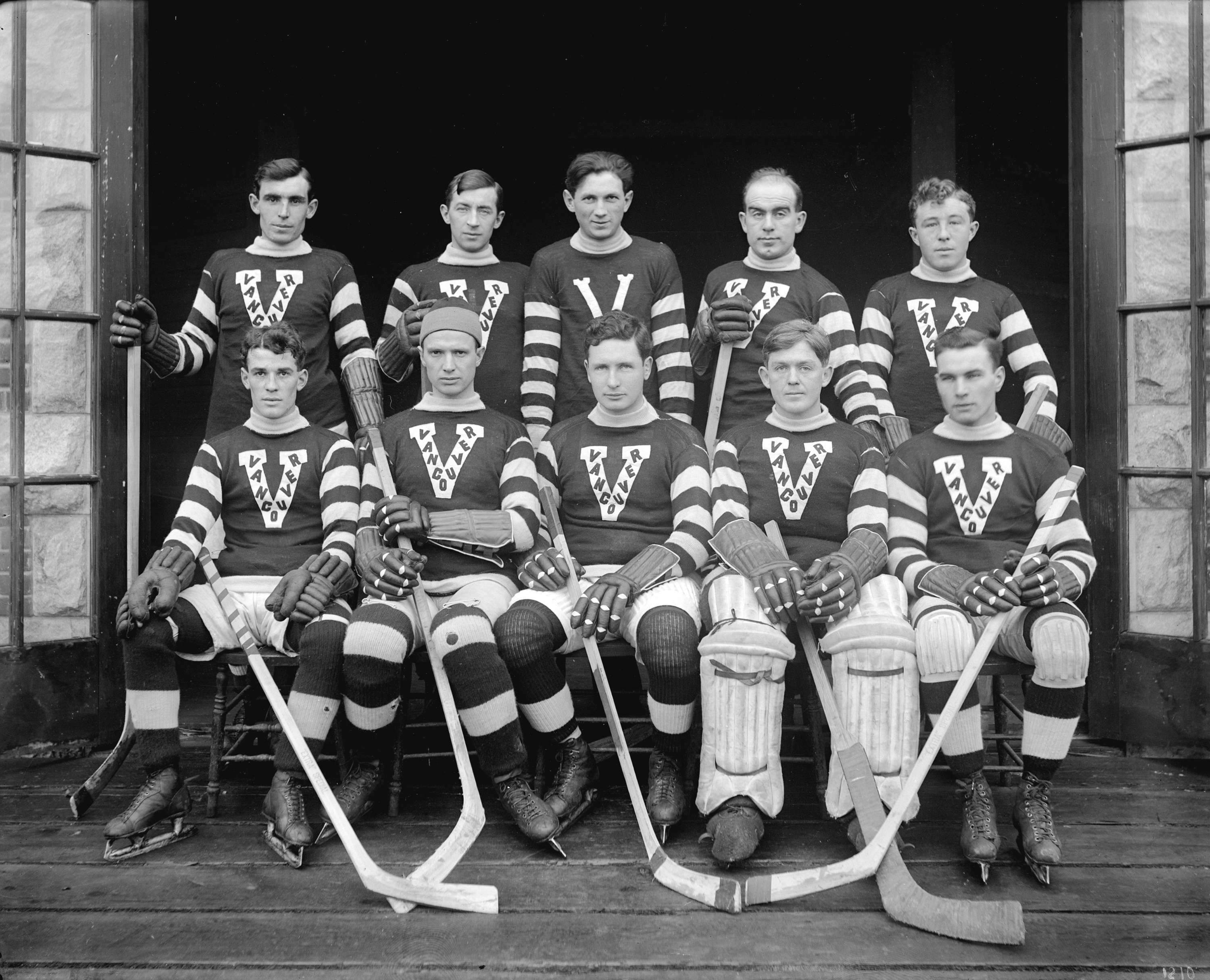
Clark, standing far right, with the 1913–14 Vancouver Millionaires.

Charles William Clark (October 16, 1891 – February 8, 1970) was a British-born Canadian professional ice hockey player. He played with the Vancouver Millionaires of the Pacific Coast Hockey Association, as a substitute goaltender, during the 1913–14 season.

Chuck Clark was born in Sevenoaks, Kent, and first played ice hockey in Strathcona, Alberta. He later played in Calgary with the Calgary Athletic Club.
