= Charles Henry Douglas Clarke =

Canadian zoologist (1909–1981)

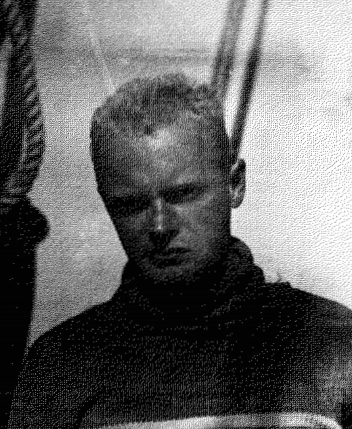
- Charles Henry Douglas Clarke, in September 1937, at the conclusion of his scientific expedition to the region of the Thelon River.
- Born: 1909; Kerwood, Ontario
- Died: 1981 (aged 71–72)
- Occupations: Forester, Zoologist
- Known for: catalogue the fauna of northern Canada

Charles Henry Douglas Clarke (1909–1981) was a Canadian forester and zoologist.

He was born in 1909 in Kerwood, Ontario. He earned a bachelor's degree in forestry, and a PhD in zoology, both at the University of Toronto. He was tasked to perform a wildlife survey, north of Lake Superior.

In 1936 he was part of an expedition to the region of the Thelon River, in the eastern Northwest Territories. It was there he conducted the research for his best known publication A Biological Investigation of the Thelon Game Sanctuary.

He held many positions and conducted several major research projects during his career. During World War II, he was involved in the North Pacific Planning Project, which among other activities established the Kluane Lake Reserve in the Yukon.

In 1977 he was recognized with an Aldo Leopold Award.

He was president of The Wildlife Society (1953-1954). He also was president of the Canadian Wildlife Federation and governor of the Arctic Institute of North America.

In 1981, he died in an ice-fishing accident.

The Canadian Section of the Wildlife Society created an award in his name, which noted:

Later in his career, Clarke became the Scientific Consultant at the Rachel Carson Institute, President of the North American Forestry Association, President and Honorary Member of The Wildlife Society, and Governor of the Arctic Institute.
