= Charlie Clark (English footballer) =

English footballer

Personal information
- Full name: Charles Clark
- Date of birth: 27 May 1917
- Place of birth: Fleet, England
- Date of death: 1 March 1943 (aged 25)
- Place of death: French Tunisia
- Height: 5 ft 7 1/2 in (1.71 m)
- Position: Winger

Senior career*
Years	Team	Apps	(Gls)
1935–1938	Queens Park Rangers	6	(0)
1938–1939	Luton Town	15	(6)
Total		21	(6)
- * Club domestic league appearances and goals

Charles Clark (27 May 1917 – 1 March 1943) was an English professional footballer who played as a winger in the Football League for Queens Park Rangers and Luton Town.

== Personal life ==
Clark served as a lance sergeant in the Hampshire Regiment (later the Royal Hampshire Regiment) during the Second World War and died of wounds in Tunisia on 1 March 1943 while serving with the 2/4th Battalion of his regiment. He is buried at Beja War Cemetery.

== Career statistics ==
Appearances and goals by club, season and competition
Club	Season	League			FA Cup		Total	
Club	Season	Division	Apps	Goals	Apps	Goals	Apps	Goals
Queens Park Rangers	1935–36	Third Division South	1	0	0	0	1	0
Queens Park Rangers	1936–37	Third Division South	2	0	0	0	2	0
Queens Park Rangers	1937–38	Third Division South	3	0	0	0	0	0
Queens Park Rangers	Total		6	0	0	0	6	0
Luton Town	1938–39	Second Division	14	6	1	0	15	6
Career total			21	6	0	0	21	6
