= Charles Clarke (cricketer, born 1878) =

Scottish cricketer

Charles Clarke (11 April 1878 – unknown) was a Scottish cricketer active from 1902 to 1905 who played for Sussex and Lancashire. He was born in Partick. He appeared in four first-class matches as a lefthanded batsman who bowled left arm medium pace. He scored seventeen runs with a highest score of 10 and took one wicket.
