= Charles Boss Clarke =

American architect

Charles B. Clarke
- Born: April 6, 1836; Norwich, Connecticut, US
- Died: January 4, 1899 (aged 63)
- Burial place: Bellefontaine Cemetery, St. Louis

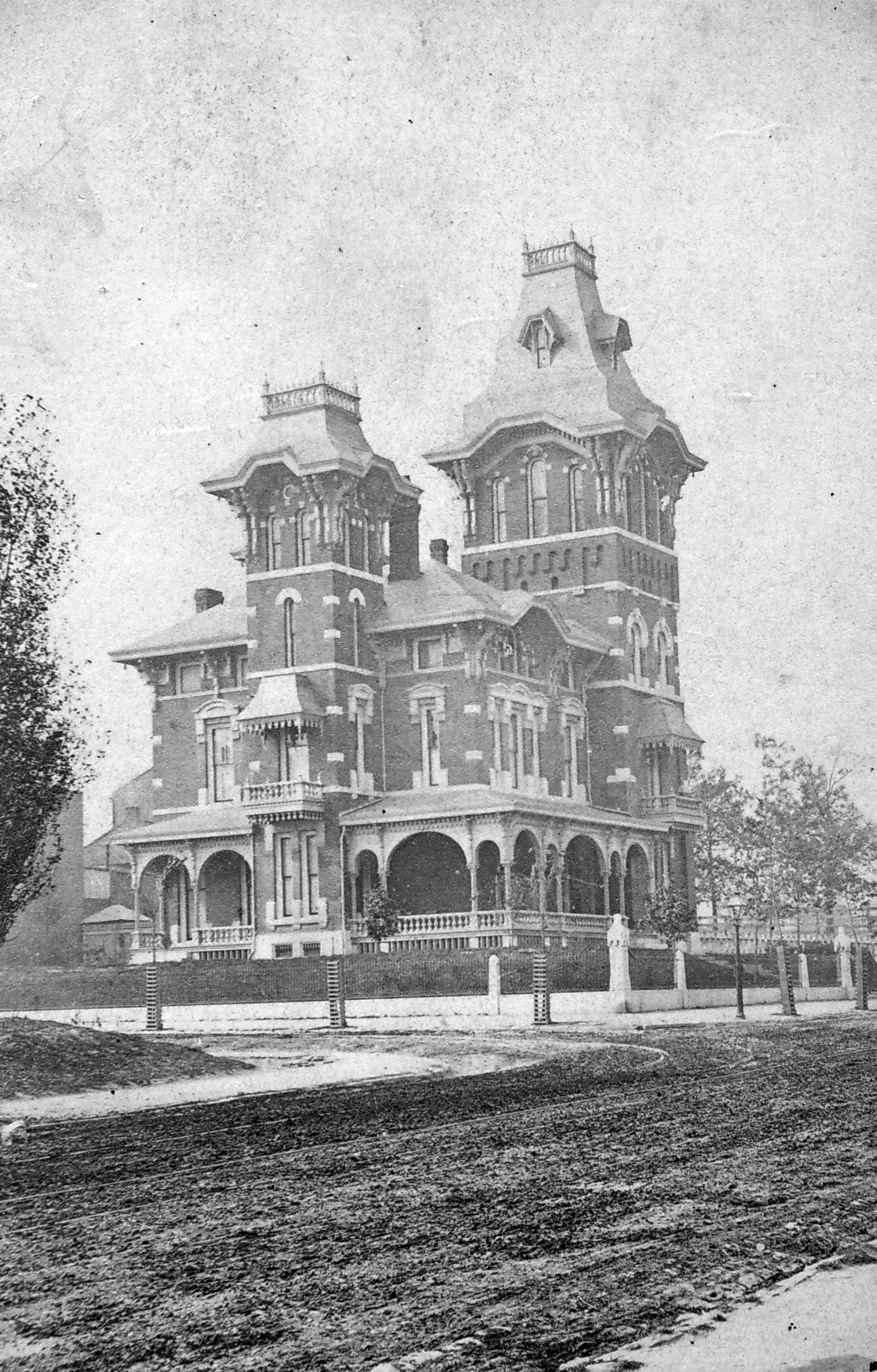
Jonathan Pierce Residence

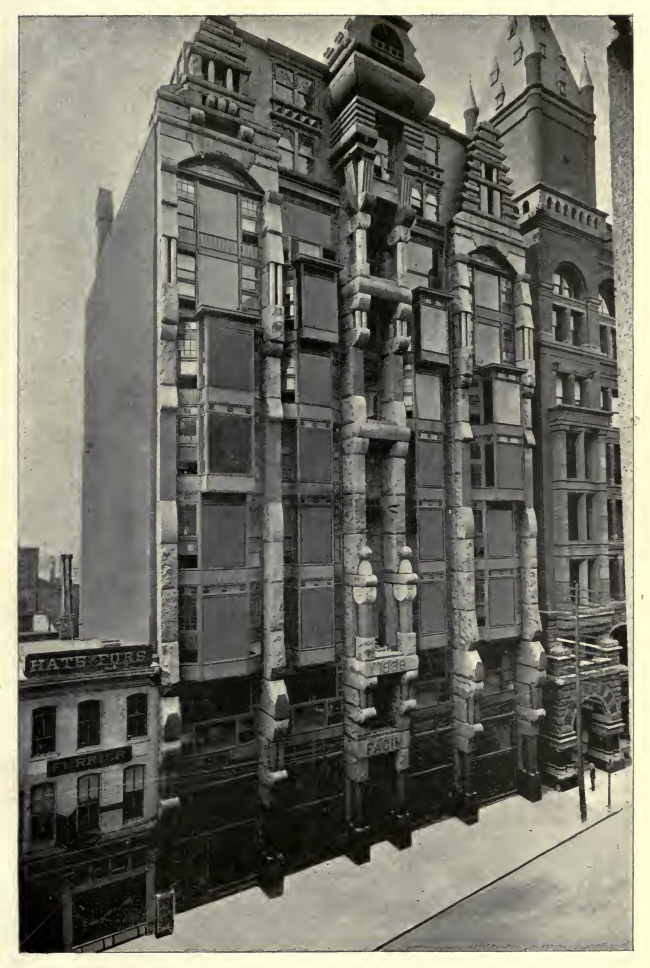
Fagin Building, St. Louis

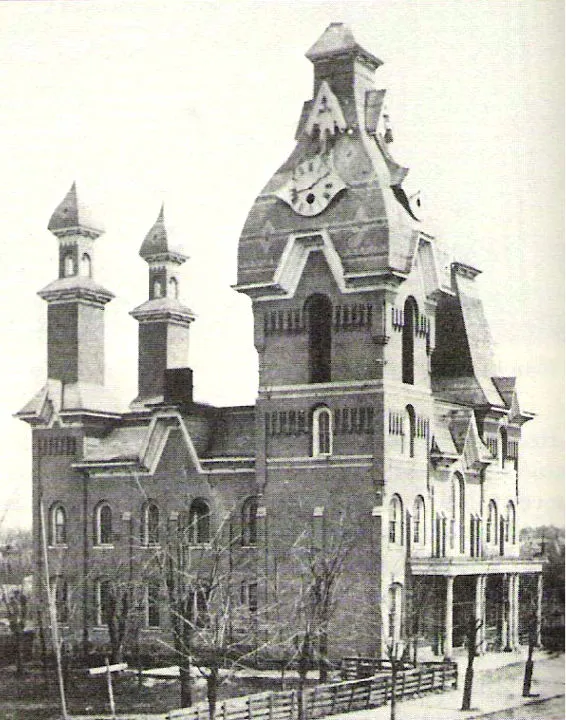
Randolph County Courthouse, 1877, Huntsville, Missouri

Charles Boss Clarke (1836–1899), commonly known as Charles B. Clarke, was an American architect working in St. Louis.

== Career ==
Charles was born in 1836 in Norwich, Connecticut. He came to St. Louis around 1859 and began practicing architecture. The majority of his commissions were in out-state Missouri, where his penchant for designing exotic victorian buildings made him well-known. Characteristics of his work included elaborate rooflines and powerful massing. Within his lifetime, his work received negative evaluation as well, drawing criticism for his abilities as a superintendent and designer on buildings which required enormous repairs within three years of construction. In 2004, his last remaining known work of the 33 known buildings he designed was demolished.

=== John Pierce Mansion ===
The John Pierce mansion in St. Louis was one of Clarke's most well-known commissions. The structure was characteristic of Clarke's works and featured dramatic massing with a complex roofline.

=== Fagin Building ===
Clarke's Fagin Building, constructed in St. Louis, was commissioned by Aaron W. Fagin, the vice president of the Merchant's Exchange of St. Louis. Fagin wished, upon returning from a worldwide trip, to furnish St. Louis with a unique and original building. The Fagin building, when completed, was described by one newspaper with lavish praise in 1890. In 1893, the building was described by one critic in the Architectural Record as the "most discreditable piece of architecture in the United States". In the same review, it was described to embody "all the vices and crudities that we call 'western', though in fact the geography has nothing to do with them."

More recent scholarship has placed the building within the struggle to define the appropriate architecture for the tall office building as an emerging building type.

== Personal life ==
Clarke married Nancy Josephine, fourth daughter of Aaron W. Fagin, on June 26, 1873. He died on January 6, 1899.

== Known works ==
Clarke has at least 33 known works credited to his authorship by a published list. Notable entries include:

- State Normal School, Cape Girardeau, Missouri
- Central High School, Chillicothe, 1875 (razed 1923)
- Third Baptist Church, St. Louis, 1867
- St. Luke's Hospital, St. Louis, 1870
- Randolph County Courthouse remodeling, Huntsville, Missouri, 1877 (burned 1882)
- Fagin Building, St. Louis, 1888 (Demolished)
- John Pierce Mansion, St. Louis, 1868 (Destroyed)
- Clusky-Elms House, Jennings, 1871 (Demolished 2004)

== See also ==
- Architecture of St. Louis
- Early Skyscrapers
- Second Empire Style
