= Clarke =

Clarke is a surname which means "clerk". The surname is of English and Irish origin and comes from the Latin clericus. Variants include Clerk and Clark. Clarke is also uncommonly chosen as a given name.

== Irish surname origin ==
Clarke is a common surname in Ireland. The Irish version of the surname is believed to have come from County Galway and County Antrim and spread to County Donegal and County Dublin. The name is derived from the Irish Gaelic sept Ó Cléirigh, meaning "clerk".

== English surname origin ==
Clarke, as well as Clark, is also a widespread surname in England. The English version is of Anglo-Saxon origin and was used in the Middle Ages for the name of a scribe or secretary. The word "clerc", which came from the pre-7th century Old English "Cler(e)c" (meaning priest), originally denoted a member of a religious order, but later became widespread. In the Middle Ages, virtually the only people who could read and write were members of religious orders, linking the word with literacy. Thus the surname became a popular term for a literate man, particularly for the professional secretary and the scholar. The English surnames Clarke and Clark are spelling variations. Beauclerk is a related surname, from the Anglo-Norman meaning "fine scholar", and the French surname Leclerc is in the same family of names.

== People with the surname ==
- A. Clarke (Leicestershire cricketer), English cricketer
- Adam Clarke (1760–1832), British biblical scholar
- Adam Vincent Clarke, composer
- Adele Clarke (1945–2024), American sociologist
- Adline Clarke, American politician
- A. E. Clarke, architect working in Australia from the 1890s
- Alan Clarke (1935–1990), British TV and film director
- Alexander Ross Clarke (1828–1914), British geodesist
- Alf Clarke (1926–1971), English footballer
- Alfie Clarke (disambiguation), several people
- Alfred Clarke (disambiguation), several people
- Allan Clarke (footballer) (born 1946), English footballer
- Andrew Clarke (disambiguation), several people
- Ann or Anne Clarke (disambiguation)
- Anthony or Tony Clarke – see Anthony Clarke (disambiguation)
- Arianna Clarke (born 1999), Australian rules footballer
- Arthur C. Clarke (1917–2008), English science-fiction author, futurist, inventor and undersea explorer
- Ashley Clarke (1903–1994), British ambassador to Italy, founder of the Venice in Peril Fund
- Austin Clarke (novelist) (1934–2016), Barbadian novelist, essayist and short-story writer
- Austin Clarke (poet) (1896–1974), Irish poet
- Basil Clarke (1879–1947), British writer and newspaper war correspondent
- Bertie Clarke (1918–1993), West Indian cricketer
- Bethia Clarke (1867–1959), British artist
- Bill or Billy Clarke – see William Clarke (disambiguation)
- Bob Clarke (disambiguation)
- Bobbie Clarke (1940–2014), British rock drummer
- Bobby Clarke (born 1949), Canadian ice hockey player
- Brandon Clarke (1996–2026), Canadian-American basketball player
- Brandon Clarke (chess player) (born 1995), English chess player
- Brandt Clarke (born 2003), Canadian ice hockey player
- Brian Clarke (disambiguation), several people
- Bruce B. G. Clarke (born 1943), US Army officer, author and consultant
- Bruce C. Clarke (1901–1988), American general
- Buck Clarke (1933–1988), American jazz percussionist
- C. Clarke (1837 English cricketer), English cricketer
- C. Clarke (Sheffield cricketer), English cricketer
- Caitlin Clarke (1952–2004), American actress
- Cam Clarke (born 1957), American voice actor
- Campbell Clarke (1835–1902), British journalist
- Carter Clarke (1896–1987), American brigadier general
- Caspar Purdon Clarke (1846–1911), English architect and museum director
- Catherine Clarke, British historian
- Catherine Goddard Clarke (1900–1968), American Catholic writer and religious community founder
- Cecil Vandepeer Clarke (1897–1961), British soldier and inventor
- Charles Clarke (disambiguation)
- Charlotte Clarke, Scottish academic researching dementia
- Cheryl Clarke, American writer
- Chris Clarke (disambiguation)
- Claire D. Clarke (d. 2022), American politician
- Clem S. Clarke (1897–1967), American oilman and politician
- Coty Clarke (born 1992), American basketball player in the Israeli National League
- Cyril Clarke (1907–2000), English physician and medical researcher
- Darren Clarke (born 1968), Northern Irish golfer
- Darren Clarke, Co Louth Gaa Footballer
- David Clarke (disambiguation)
- Dean Clarke (disambiguation)
- Denzel Clarke (born 2000), Canadian baseball player
- Dominic Clarke (born 1997), Australian trampoline gymnast
- Don or Donald Clarke (disambiguation)
- Dora Clarke (1895–1989), English artist
- Doug or Douglas Clarke (disambiguation)
- Drew Clarke, Australian public servant
- Dudley Clarke (1899–1974), British intelligence officer
- Eddie Clarke (musician) (1950–2018), British guitarist and podcaster
- Edith Clarke (1883–1959), American electrical engineer and professor
- Edmund M. Clarke (1945–2020), American computer scientist
- Edward Clarke (disambiguation)
- Edwin Clarke (1919–1996), British neurologist and medical historian
- Ellis Clarke (1917–2010), lawyer, diplomat, Governor General, President of the Republic of Trinidad and Tobago
- Emilia Clarke (born 1986), English actress
- Ernest Clarke (1856–1923), English historian of agriculture
- Eva Clarke (born 1945), British-Czech Holocaust survivor
- Frank Clarke (disambiguation), also Francis and Franklin
- Frederick S. Clarke (1949-2000), American magazine publisher, editor, and writer
- Garvin Clarke (born 2001), Bahamian basketballer
- George Clarke (disambiguation)
- Gillian Clarke (born 1937), Welsh poet
- Goland Vanhalt Clarke (1875–1944), British Army brigadier-general, big game hunter, naturalist
- Gordon Luke Clarke (born 1945), New Zealand-born 1970s fashion designer
- Graeme Clarke (born 2001), American ice hockey player
- Harold Clarke (disambiguation)
- Harry Clarke (disambiguation)
- Helen Clarke (disambiguation)
- Henri Jacques Guillaume Clarke (1765–1818), Franco-Irish general under Napoleon I
- Henry Clarke (disambiguation)
- Heroy Clarke, Jamaican politician
- Hilda Clarke (1896–1981), American politician
- Horace Clarke (born 1940–2020), Virgin Islander Major League Baseball player
- Hyde Clarke (1815–1895), English engineer, philologist and author
- Ian Clarke (disambiguation)
- Jack Clarke, multiple people
- Jacob Augustus Lockhart Clarke (1817–1880), British neurologist
- James Clarke (disambiguation), also Jim Clarke
- Jason Clarke (born 1969), Australian actor
- Jay Clarke (disambiguation)
- Jennie Thornley Clarke (c. 1866–?), American educator, writer, anthologist
- Jennifer Susan Dodd Clarke, British philanthropist and business executive
- Jennifer Ward Clarke (1935–2015), British cellist
- Jeremiah Clarke (1674–1707), English baroque composer
- Jeremy Clarke (disambiguation)
- John Clarke (disambiguation)
- Justine Clarke (born 1971), Australian actress and singer
- Katie Rose Clarke (born 1984), American musical theatre actress
- Kathleen Clarke (1878–1972), Irish political activist
- Kenneth Clarke (born 1940), British politician; Chancellor of the Exchequer
- Lennox Clarke (born 1991), English professional boxer
- Lige Clarke (1942−1975), American LGBT activist, journalist and author
- Luther W. Clarke (1825–1869), American politician
- Lydia Clarke (1923–2018), American actress and photographer
- Mae Clarke (1910–1992), American actress
- Malcolm Clarke (disambiguation)
- Marcus Clarke (1846–1881), Australian novelist
- Maree Clarke, Australian multidisciplinary artist and educator
- Martin Clarke (disambiguation)
- Mary Clarke (disambiguation)
- Matthew Clarke (disambiguation), also Matt Clarke
- Maura Clarke (1931–1980), American nun, martyr, killed in El Salvador
- Maurice Gordon Clarke (1877–1944), American football and baseball player and coach
- Megan Clarke, American cancer epidemiologist
- Michael Clarke (disambiguation), also Mike Clarke
- Mitch Clarke (born 1985), Canadian mixed martial artist
- Mitch Clarke (basketball) (born 1999), Australian basketball player
- Nancy Clarke (entrepreneur) (died 1811 or 1812), Barbadian hotelier and free woman of colour
- Naomi Clarke, (born 1982), New Zealand soccer player
- Nevelle Clarke (born 1996), American football player
- Nig Clarke (1882–1949), American baseball player
- Nigel Clarke (disambiguation), several people
- Nobby Clarke (1907–1981), English footballer
- Noel Clarke (born 1975), British actor, director and screenwriter
- Norm Clarke (1942–2025), American journalist
- Olive Clarke (1922–2023), English farmer and public figure
- Patrick Clarke, (born 1965), Irish actor, director, producer and screenwriter
- Pauline Clarke (1921–2013), British writer
- Peter Clarke (disambiguation)
- Philip Clarke (disambiguation)
- Powhatan Henry Clarke (1862–1893), United States Army first lieutenant, recipient of the Medal of Honor during the Indian Wars
- Ralph Clarke (mayor) (died 1660), mayor of Chesterfield, 1598
- Rebecca Clarke (disambiguation)
- Richard Clarke (disambiguation)
- Robert Clarke (disambiguation)
- Roger Clarke (disambiguation)
- Ronald Clarke (disambiguation)
- Rotnei Clarke (born 1989), American basketball player
- Rozlyne Clarke (born 1967), Australian make-up artist, musical theatre actor and dance music singer
- Ryan Clarke (disambiguation)
- Samuel Clarke (disambiguation)
- Sarah Clarke (disambiguation)
- Sharon D. Clarke (born 1966), English actress and singer
- Sidney Clarke (1831–1909), American politician
- Simon Clarke (disambiguation)
- Stanley Clarke (born 1951), American double bass and bass guitar musician
- Stephen or Steve Clarke – see Stephen Clark (disambiguation)
- Susanna Clarke (born 1959), British novelist (Jonathan Strange & Mr Norrell)
- Sylvester Clarke, (1954–1999), West Indian cricketer
- Taylor Clarke (born 1993), American baseball player
- Terrel E. Clarke (1920–1997), American businessman and politician
- Theo Clarke (born 1985), British Member of Parliament elected 2019
- Theophilus Clarke (1776?–1831), English painter
- Tom or Thomas Clarke (disambiguation)
- Troy Clarke (disambiguation)
- Vince Clarke (born 1960), British musician with the band Erasure
- Wayne Clarke (footballer) (born 1961), English former footballer
- William Clarke (disambiguation)
- Yvette D. Clarke (born 1964), American politician, member of the United States House of Representatives
- Hannah Clarke/Baxter (1988–2020), Australian sportsperson and murder victim

== Fictional characters ==
- Christian Clarke, in the BBC soap opera EastEnders
- Isaac Clarke, main protagonist of the Dead Space video game series
- Linda Clarke, in the BBC soap opera EastEnders
- Roger Clarke (EastEnders), in the BBC soap opera EastEnders
- Shane Clarke, in the Power Rangers Ninja Storm
