= Samuel Clark =

Samuel Clark or Clarke may refer to:

== Clark ==
- Samuel Clark (minister) (1727–1769), English minister
- Samuel Clark (New York and Michigan politician) (1800–1870), American politician from New York and Michigan
- Samuel Reed Clark (1826–?), American politician from Wisconsin
- Samuel M. Clark (1842–1900), American politician from Iowa
- Samuel Clark (rugby union) (1857–1947), Welsh international rugby player
- Samuel Churchill Clark (1842–1862), Confederate military officer
- Samuel Findlay Clark (1909–1998), Canadian soldier
- Samuel J. Clark, American demographer
- Samuel Kelly Clark (1924–2006), American mechanical engineer known for work in tire mechanics
- S. D. Clark (Samuel Delbert Clark, 1910–2003), Canadian sociologist
- Sam Clark (born 1987), Australian actor and singer-songwriter

== Clarke ==
- Samuel Clarke (minister) (1599–1683), English clergyman and Puritan biographer
- Samuel Clarke (Archdeacon of Derby) (1582–1641), Church of England Laudian cleric and opponent of Puritanism
- Samuel Clarke (annotator) (1626–1701), English Nonconformist clergyman known as an assiduous annotator of the Bible
- Samuel Clarke (dean of Clonmacnoise), Anglican priest in Ireland during the 17th century
- Samuel Clarke (1675–1729), English philosopher and Anglican clergyman
- Samuel Clarke of St Albans (1684–1750), English Nonconformist pastor and theological writer
- Samuel Asahel Clarke (1827–1909), Oregon poet, journalist, and historian
- Samuel Clarke (Canadian politician) (1853–?), Canadian merchant and politician
- Sam Clarke (motorcyclist) (born 1996), Australian motorcycle racer
- Sir Samuel Clarke, 1st Baronet (died 1719) of the Clarke baronets
