= Ralph Clarke =

Ralph Clarke may refer to:

- Ralph Clarke (British politician) (1892–1970), British Conservative Member of Parliament for East Grinstead 1936–1955
- Ralph Clarke (Australian politician) (born 1951), Australian Labor Party member of the South Australian House of Assembly 1993–2002
- Ralph Clarke (mayor) (died 1660), Mayor of Chesterfield 1598.

== See also ==
- Ralph Clark, British officer in the Royal Marines
- Clarke (surname)
