= Don Clark =

Don or Donald Clark may refer to:

== Sports ==
- Donald Clark (cricketer) (1914–1994), Australian cricketer who played for Tasmania
- Don Clark (footballer) (1917–2014), English association football player
- Don Clark (American football) (1923–1989), American football player and coach, head football coach at the University of Southern California
- Don Clark (Canadian football) (born 1936), running back in the Canadian Football League
- Don Clark (rugby union) (born 1940), New Zealand rugby union player

== Other ==
- Don Clark (psychologist) (born 1930), clinical psychologist who has specialized in group and individual work with gay people
- Donald C. Clark Sr. (1931–2020), American business executive
- Don Clark (musician) (born 1975), guitarist of Christian metal band Demon Hunter

== See also ==
- Don Clarke (1933–2002), rugby union player
- Don R. Clarke (born 1945), general authority of the Church of Jesus Christ of Latter-day Saints
- Donald Clarke (disambiguation)
