= Logan (soundtrack) =

Logan: Original Motion Picture Soundtrack

Film score by Marco Beltrami
- Released: March 3, 2017
- Recorded: 2017
- Genre: Film score
- Length: 57:31
- Labels: Lakeshore; Sony Classical; Fox Music
- Producers: Marco Beltrami; Buck Sanders

Marco Beltrami chronology
Matilda (2017)	Logan (2017)	Little Evil (2017)

Logan: Original Motion Picture Soundtrack is the score album to the 2017 film of the same name, featuring the Marvel Comics character Wolverine. It is the tenth installment in the X-Men film series and the third and final installment in the Wolverine trilogy following X-Men Origins: Wolverine (2009) and The Wolverine (2013). The film is directed by James Mangold, and featured musical score composed by Marco Beltrami, having previously worked together in the predecessor.

The original score was set to be composed by Cliff Martinez, but due to creative differences, Beltrami took over the scoring duties and worked on the film score from January–February 2017. Lakeshore Records distributed and published the soundtrack, with licensing from Sony Classical Records and Fox Music and released in digital formats on March 3, 2017, alongside the film, and a physical CD release on March 31. A deluxe edition of the soundtrack was also unveiled on April 21, featuring an additional track. The score received positive critical reviews, with praise towards Beltrami's minimalistic musical approach and production.

== Background ==
In July 2016, Cliff Martinez was announced as the composer of Logan's musical score. In December 2016, Mangold announced that Marco Beltrami, who had previously collaborated with Mangold on 3:10 to Yuma (2007) and The Wolverine (2013), would take over from Martinez and score Logan instead. The score was recorded within two months at the Newman Scoring Stage in 20th Century Fox Studios. Due to the limited duration, Beltrami had to work extensively for the score.

In an interview, Beltrami had stated "Jim [James] didn't want a [traditional] thematic score — he wanted an emotionally supportive score. So there was a delicate balance, and I experimented with some unique instruments for it." During the composition, he was asked to listen to film scores, such as Taxi Driver (1976), to describe about the 1970s jazz music and its intensity. He also tried to compose a similar thematic score, but eventually did not do so. However, he captured the intensity of that score, as a result, he took a minimalistic musical approach. Beltrami used Western overtones to the score, devoid of traditional composition, an approach he did in The Wolverine (2013).

The track "Old Man Logan" included various instruments such as Hammond organ, glass harmonica, and drum kits as Beltrami wanted to create an organic approach to develop the score as "mysterious". Mangold had referenced Paper Moon (1973) and The Gauntlet (1977) as examples, which did not have a score, but described the analogies to Logan's relationship the young mutant girl, Laura. Beltrami said "Laura's theme, meanwhile, was also based on organ and glass harmonica to musically unite her with Logan". He also added a two-note repetition that recurs several times, especially for the themes of Xavier and Caliban. For the former, he used a harmonic guitar, that lent a "soft, supernatural aura", and for the negative character Reavers and X-24 super Wolverine clone, he used a "low, menacing synthetic sound". In addition, he inversed the same theme for the action sequences, to connect those themes from the same family. The action music was subdued for most parts, except for few action sequence.

For the climax sequence, which Beltrami described it as "challenging", as it was the end of the film and the franchise, he played an epic score for the film, but also felt it had to be very "quiet and subdued" and was about "hitting the balance of not feeling forced and not leading the picture".

== Release history ==
Logan: Original Motion Picture Soundtrack was released digitally by Lakeshore Records on March 3, 2017 and a CD release on March 31, 2017. The deluxe edition of the soundtrack was later revealed on April 21. On July 19, 2017, at San Diego Comic-Con, special edition vinyl soundtrack of Logan featuring two-disc colored vinyl sets and artwork, was released alongside the vinyl edition of Deadpool soundtrack. Another vinyl edition was published by Lakeshore on August 11.

== Track listing ==
=== Standard edition ===
All music is composed by Marco Beltrami.

Logan: Original Motion Picture Soundtrack
No.	Title	Length
1.	"Main Titles"	2:21
2.	"Laura"	2:24
3.	"The Grim Reavers"	1:32
4.	"Old Man Logan"	2:45
5.	"Alternate Route to Mexico"	1:23
6.	"That's Not a Choo-Choo"	2:13
7.	"X-24"	2:46
8.	"El Limo-Nator"	1:38
9.	"Gabriella's Video"	2:35
10.	"To the Cemetery"	0:55
11.	"Goodnight Moon"	1:55
12.	"Farm Aid"	3:11
13.	"Feral Tween"	3:34
14.	"Driving to Mexico"	1:42
15.	"You Can't Break the Mould"	1:07
16.	"Up to Eden"	1:51
17.	"Beyond the Hills"	2:09
18.	"Into the Woods"	3:09
19.	"Forest Fight"	2:30
20.	"Logan vs. X-24"	4:13
21.	"Don't Be What They Made You"	2:04
22.	"Eternum – Laura's Theme"	3:34
23.	"Logan's Limo"	2:32
24.	"Loco Logan"	1:20
25.	"Logan Drives"	2:08
Total length:		57:31

=== Deluxe edition ===
All music is composed by Marco Beltrami.

Logan (Official Motion Picture Soundtrack) (Deluxe Edition)
No.	Title	Length
1.	"Main Titles"	2:21
2.	"Laura"	2:24
3.	"The Grim Reavers"	1:32
4.	"Old Man Logan"	2:45
5.	"Alternate Route to Mexico"	1:23
6.	"That's Not a Choo-Choo"	2:13
7.	"X-24"	2:46
8.	"El Limo-Nator"	1:38
9.	"Gabriella's Video"	2:35
10.	"To the Cemetery"	0:55
11.	"Goodnight Moon"	1:55
12.	"Farm Aid"	3:11
13.	"Feral Tween"	3:34
14.	"Driving to Mexico"	1:42
15.	"You Can't Break the Mould"	1:07
16.	"Up to Eden"	1:51
17.	"Beyond the Hills"	2:09
18.	"Into the Woods"	3:09
19.	"Forest Fight"	2:30
20.	"Logan vs. X-24"	4:13
21.	"Don't Be What They Made You"	2:04
22.	"X Marks the Plot"	1:30
23.	"Eternum – Laura's Theme"	3:34
24.	"Logan's Limo"	2:32
25.	"Loco Logan"	1:20
26.	"Logan Drives"	2:08
Total length:		59:01

== Reception ==
Beltrami's musical score received critical acclaim, praising the composition and the minimalistic approach. Jonathan Broxton, in his critical review, wrote "there will be a significant disconnect between it and those who grew up listening to Michael Kamen, John Ottman, and John Powell's X-Men scores, because Beltrami's Logan is just so different from anything we have heard in a super-hero movie before. On the one hand, this is commendable; bucking expectations and taking an entirely new approach to a well-defined musical genre is not an easy thing to do, but that's exactly what Beltrami has done here. On the other hand, listeners will still need to be comfortable with music that shifts between being dissonant, ambient, and jazzy, and which has more in common with the work of Ennio Morricone, Jerry Fielding, Elliot Goldenthal, and Bernard Herrmann, than anyone who has scored a super-hero movie before. If you're cool with that, then Logan will find a way to at least entertain you and allow you to experience its unusual tonal palette. If not, then you may find yourself recoiling in horror like Caliban from the sun, or experiencing a psychic attack of your own."

Filmtracks.com wrote "The former is at least tolerable and marginally frightening. The other motifs are either obnoxious to the point of laughter or obtusely ineffectual due to pacing and subversion. Exercising some of this nightmarish musical environment is fine so long as it is used as counterpoint to the alternative, namely Logan's past. Without that disparity in battle within this film, there can be no proper emotional catharsis, and it makes for an extremely dull and mind-numbing album that conveys no narrative for the otherwise important closing chapter for two vital franchise characters. On the other hand, as critics noted about the film in general, kudos need to be supplied for taking a chance, and Beltrami responded to this unusual demand as best as anyone could have. While this music is less cohesive and tolerable than The Wolverine, it's at least more technically intelligent, and they thus receive the same rating. On album, though, be prepared for adamantium poisoning of your ears."

Soundtrack Beat gave 8/10 to the film score and wrote "If music in every other X-Men movie was speaking, in “Logan” music is whispering. Music whispers all the anger and rage simmering inside Logan that it's about to be unleashed. After all, the movie isn't rated R without reason! Marco Beltrami succeeds in creating a believable and completely compatible musical environment for Logan, that it's impossible to imagine the film without it. Marco Beltrami's score is really the soul of the film." Seattlepi's Tall Writer wrote "This is a great score and amazing experience that's well outlined with great transitions and blending flow. Producers wisely choose the best pieces and not the entire score as well as the songs, like Johnny Cash's "The Man Comes Around," which gets played at the ending credits. Like the film, you won't forget this score anytime soon."

== Chart performance ==
Chart (2017)	Peak position
UK Soundtrack Albums (OCC)	31
US Soundtrack Albums (Billboard)	21

== Accolades ==
Logan's original score by Beltrami was shortlisted as one among the 118 potential contenders chosen by Academy of Motion Picture Arts and Sciences for the nominations of Best Original Score category at the 90th Academy Awards. However, it was not nominated.

Award	Date of ceremony	Category	Recipient(s)	Result	Ref.
Hollywood Music in Media Awards	November 16, 2017	Best Original Score – Sci-Fi/Fantasy/Horror Film	Marco Beltrami	Nominated	

== Personnel ==
Credits adapted from CD liner notes

Production

- Composer – Marco Beltrami
- Additional music – Brandon Roberts, Marcus Trumpp
- Producer– Buck Sanders
- Recording – Vincent Cirilli, Gregory Mueller, Tim Lauber, John Kurlander, Tyson Lozensky
- Mixing – John Kurlander
- Mastering – Erick Labson
- Editing – Ted Caplan
- Music supervisor – Anton Monsted, Ted Caplan
- Copyist – Joann Kane Music Service, Mark Graham
- Executive producer – James Mangold, Skip Williamson

Instrumentation

- Bassoon – Ken Munday, Samantha Duckworth
- Cello – Andrew Shulman, Armen Ksajikian, Cecilia Tsan, Dennis Karmazyn, Evgeny Tonkha, Paula Hochhalter, Simone Vitucci, Steve Erdody, Tim Landauer
- Clarinet – Ralph Williams
- Contrabass – Edward Meares, Geoffrey Osika, Michael Valerio, Nico Abondolo, Steve Dress, Thomas Harte
- Glass harmonica – Jake Schlaerth
- Guitar – Andrew Synowiec
- Harmonica – Ross Garren
- Horn – Benjamin Jaber, Daniel Kelley, Dylan Hart, Jennie Kim, Katelyn Faraudo, Mark Adams, Steve Becknell, Teag Reaves
- Keyboards – Randy Kerber, Robert Thies
- Percussion – David Elitch, Gregory Goodall, MB Gordy, Matthew Chamberlain, Peter Erskine, Wade Culbreath
- Trombone – Alan Kaplan, Alex Iles, Andrew Martin*, Craig Gosnell, Phillip Keen, William Booth
- Trumpet – Barry Perkins, David Washburn, Dustin McKinney, Jon Lewis, Robert Schaer
- Tuba – Doug Tornquist
- Viola – Alma Fernandez, Andrew Duckles, Brian Dembow, Darrin McCann, David Walther, Jeanie Lim, Kathryn Reddish, Laura Pearson, Maria Newman, Meredith Crawford, Robert Brophy, Rodney Wirtz, Scott Hosfeld, Shawn Mann
- Violin – Alyssa Park, Amy Hershberger, Belinda Broughton, Benjamin Powell, Bruce Dukov, Charlie Bisharat, Darius Campo, Elizabeth Hedman, Grace Oh, Helen Nightengale, Irina Voloshina, Jessica Guideri, Julie Gigante, Katia Popov, Kevin Connolly, Kevin Kumar, Lisa Liu, Lisa Sutton, Lorand Lokuszta, Maia Jasper-White*, Marisa Kuney, Natalie Leggett, Neil Samples, Phillip Levy, Radu Pieptea, Rafael Rishik, Roberto Cani, Roger Wilkie, Sara Parkins, Sarah Thornblade, Serena McKinney, Sharon Jackson (2), Songa Lee, Steven Zander, Tamara Hatwan, Tina Qu, Yelena Yegoryan

Orchestra

- Orchestra – The Hollywood Studio Symphony
- Orchestra conductor – Pete Anthony
- Orchestra contractor – Peter Rotter
- Orchestration – Dana Niu, Rossano Galante, Pete Anthony
- Stage engineer – Denis St. Amand
- Stage manager – Damon Tedesco, Tom Steel

Management

- A&R – Eric Craig
- Art direction – John Bergin
- Executive in charge of music – Danielle Diego
- Production manager – Johnny Choi
- Music production supervisor – Rebecca Morellato
