= Matthew Clarke =

Matthew or Matt Clarke may refer to:

- Matthew Clarke (Australian footballer) (born 1973), Australian rules footballer
- Matthew Clarke (runner) (born 1995), Australian runner
- Matthew Clarke (footballer, born 1980), footballer who has played for Darlington and Bradford City
- Matthew Clarke (footballer, born 1994), Northern Irish football defender for Livingston
- Matthew Clarke (footballer, born 1996), footballer who plays for Middlesbrough
- Matt Clarke (footballer, born 1973), former football goalkeeper
- Matthew Clarke, Lord Clarke (born 1945), Scottish judge
- Matthew St. Clair Clarke (1790–1852), Clerk of the US House of Representatives
- Matthew Clarke (physician) (1701–1778), English physician
- Matthew Clarke (politician) (1863–1923), Australian politician

== See also ==
- Matthew Clark (disambiguation)
- Matthew Clerk (1659–1735), Presbyterian minister
