= Gerald Clarke =

Gerald Clarke may refer to:

- Gerald Clarke (author), American biographer
- Gerald Clarke (artist), Cahuillia sculptor and artist from California
- Gerald B. Clarke, Rhodesian politician

== See also ==
- Gerry Clark (1927–1999), New Zealand sailor and ornithologist
- Jeremy Clark (born 1982), American football player
- Jeremy Clarke (disambiguation)
