= Becky Clarke =

Becky Clarke may refer to:

- Becky Clarke, a character in Taken
- Becky Clarke (Doctors), a character in Doctors

== See also ==
- Rebecca Clarke (disambiguation)
