= Naomi Clark =

Naomi Clark may refer to:

- Naomi Clark (90210 character), a character on the CW show 90210
- Naomi Clark (game designer), departmental chair of NYU Game Center
- Naomi Clarke, association football player
