= Ian Clark =

Ian Clark may refer to:

- Ian Clark (basketball) (born 1991), American basketball player
- Ian Clark (director) (fl. 2002–) English film director
- Ian Clark (footballer) (born 1974), English former professional footballer
- Ian Clark (geologist) (fl. 1982–2015) professor in the Department of Earth Sciences at the University of Ottawa, Canada
- Ian Clark (speedway rider) (born 1958), English speedway rider
- Ian Clark (rugby union) (born 1992), English rugby union player
- Ian Clark (political scientist) (born 1949), British scholar of international relations
- Ian D. Clark (civil servant) (born 1946), former Canadian civil servant and Order of Canada Recipient
- Ian D. Clark (historian) (born 1958), Associate Professor of Tourism at University of Ballarat, researcher of Victorian Aboriginal history
- Ian D. Clark (actor) (born 1950), Yorkshire-born Canadian actor

== See also ==
- Ian Clarke (disambiguation)
