= Little Evil =

2017 horror comedy film

- Film poster
- Directed by: Eli Craig
- Written by: Eli Craig
- Produced by: Jason Michael Berman
- Starring: Evangeline Lilly; Adam Scott; Bridget Everett; Owen Atlas; Kyle Bornheimer; Chris D'Elia; Donald Faison; Carla Gallo; Tyler Labine; Brad Williams; Clancy Brown; Sally Field
- Cinematography: Matthew Clark
- Edited by: Tia Nolan
- Music by: Marco Beltrami; Brandon Roberts; Marcus Trumpp
- Production companies: Bluegrass Films; Mandalay Pictures
- Distributed by: Netflix
- Release date: September 1, 2017 (United States)
- Running time: 95 minutes
- Country: United States
- Language: English
- Budget: $7.5 million

Little Evil is a 2017 American supernatural horror comedy film written and directed by Eli Craig. It stars Adam Scott, Evangeline Lilly, Owen Atlas, Bridget Everett, Kyle Bornheimer, Chris D'Elia, Donald Faison, Carla Gallo, Tyler Labine, Brad Williams, Clancy Brown, and Sally Field.

In the film, a man suspects that his new stepson is "a little evil", after realizing that the boy may have caused two mysterious suicides. While investigating the boy's past, he is informed that his stepson is the Antichrist and that he may have to kill the boy to prevent the end of the world.

It was released by Netflix on September 1, 2017.

== Plot ==
Gary Bloom marries Samantha, who has a 5-year-old son, Lucas. He struggles to connect with the quiet boy, who ignores him. Gary receives a telephone call from his wedding videographer Karl, warning that something very unusual is in the footage, but he is uninterested. Gary is called to show one of his properties for sale, an old nunnery, to Father J.D. Gospel. He is the leader of a Doomsday cult, and buys it on the spot.

Gary is summoned to Lucas' school where the principal informs him that Lucas spoke out of turn in class, telling his science teacher to "go to hell". Afterwards she killed herself by jumping out the window, impaling herself on a fence. A psychiatrist stresses that Lucas see a counselor and Gary, apparently the main source of Lucas' erratic behavior, should do the same.

Samantha is upset by the news and feels that everyone, including Gary, is unfairly blaming Lucas. However, he assures her that he loves them both. At therapy, Gary confides to the other stepfathers, including his friend Al, that he thinks his stepson might be a little evil, and they all sympathize.

At Lucas' birthday party, a clown lights himself on fire, and Gary is led to believe Lucas is responsible. Karl shows him the wedding video, revealing a possessed-looking Lucas untouched by a tornado. He tells Gary that all Samantha's previous boyfriends are dead except Gabriel, giving Gary his address.

When Gary inquires about Lucas' biological father, Samantha reluctantly admits that years earlier, she was part of a cult and Lucas was conceived during a ritual. Gary convinces Al to help him, and they find Gabriel in the basement of a church where he is self-flagellating.

Gabriel reveals that Lucas is the Antichrist and tells them to travel to Bethlehem to find Gozamel the demon hunter. Gary and Al view a television news report on rioting due to the Apocalypse in Bethlehem, Pennsylvania, realizing that is where they need to go.

They find Gozamel, who informs them they must kill the child with the Knife of Destiny to prevent the end of the world. He is then killed in a car accident. Before dying, he gives Gary the Knife of Destiny to kill Lucas on hallowed ground.

Gary arrives home to find Samantha with Miss Shaylock, a woman from Child Protective Services. They encourage him to put Lucas to bed, but this goes horribly wrong, ending in Lucas burying Gary in a sandbox. Samantha digs him up, taking Lucas' side for being a confused kid, and Gary screams that Lucas is the Antichrist. Samantha is devastated, so Gary apologizes.

Convinced Lucas is the Antichrist, Gary takes him on a trip to Waterland, an amusement park blessed by the Pope, intending to drown him in what would appear to be an accident, but Lucas and Gary actually start to bond as father and son. Gary reluctantly equips Lucas with sand-filled floaties and sends him down a water slide to his death, but sees the word "Love" in the sky and takes it as a sign. Gary saves Lucas, taking him for ice cream, and they both apologize for trying to kill each other.

An amber alert for Lucas appears on Gary's phone, and police arrive to arrest Gary as Miss Shaylock, revealed to be a disciple of Father Gospel, takes Lucas. Father Gospel also kidnaps Samantha. Gary escapes to save her and Lucas.

With help from the other stepdads, they travel to the old nunnery where Father Gospel and his disciples prepare to kill Lucas and bring about the end of the world. When Lucas opens a tunnel to Hell and starts to fall into it, Gary saves him. Once freed, Samantha knocks Father Gospel into the tunnel. Weeks later, Gary and Lucas race the Okatok Soap Box Derby, finally happy as father and son.

== Cast ==
- Adam Scott as Gary Bloom, Samantha's husband and Lucas's stepfather
- Evangeline Lilly as Samantha Bloom, Gary's wife and Lucas's mother
- Owen Atlas as Lucas, Samantha's son and Gary's stepson
- Bridget Everett as Al, Gary's co-worker and best friend
- Clancy Brown as Reverend Gospel
- Sally Field as Miss Shaylock
- Kyle Bornheimer as Victor
- Chris D'Elia as Wayne
- Donald Faison as Larry
- Carla Gallo as Wendy
- Tyler Labine as Karl
- Brad Williams as Gozamel

== Production ==
In May 2013, Universal Pictures acquired the film's script, with Eli Craig directing the film, based upon the screenplay he wrote, while Scott Stuber, Nicholas Nesbitt, would serve as producers under their Mandalay Pictures and Bluegrass Films banners respectively. In September 2016, it was announced Evangeline Lilly, Adam Scott, Clancy Brown, Donald Faison, Chris D'Elia, Bridget Everett, Owen Atlas, Brad Williams, and Marcus Terrell Smith had joined the cast of the film, Dylan Clark and Jason Michael Berman would serve as producers, and Netflix would produce and distribute the film. That same month, Kyle Bornheimer joined the cast of the film.

=== Filming ===
Principal photography began in September 2016, in Cleveland, Ohio.

== Soundtrack ==
Marco Beltrami, Brandon Roberts & Marcus Trumpp composed the score for the film.

== Release ==
It began streaming on Netflix on September 1, 2017.

== Reception ==
On the review aggregator website Rotten Tomatoes, 92% of 12 critics' reviews are positive, with an average rating of 6.5/10.
