= Roger Clarke =

Roger Clarke may refer to:

- Roger Clarke (martyr) (died 1546), one of the Ipswich Martyrs
- Roger Clarke (politician) (1940–2014), 21st-century Jamaican politician
- Roger Clarke (rugby union administrator), English rugby union administrator
- Roger Clarke (ornithologist) (1952–2007), English ornithologist
- Roger Clarke (EastEnders), fictional character

== See also ==
- Roger Clark (disambiguation)
