= Phil Clark =

Phil or Philip Clark may refer to:

- Philip Lindsey Clark (1889–1977), English sculptor
- Philip Clark (rugby union) (1898–1985), American rugby union player
- Phil Clark (rugby union), Australian international rugby union player
- Phil Clark (pitcher) (1931–2018), American baseball player
- Philip T. Clark (1935–1968), automotive designer
- Phil Clark (American football) (born 1945), American football player
- Phil Clark (outfielder) (born 1968), American baseball player
- Phil Clark (political scientist) (born 1979), Australian political scientist
- Phil Clark (director), theatre director and writer
- Philip J. Clark (1920–1964), American ecologist and zoologist

== See also ==
- Philip Clarke (disambiguation)
