= Alfred Clarke =

Alfred Clarke may refer to:

- Alf Clarke (1926–1971), English footballer and manager
- Alfred Clarke (Australian cricketer) (1868–1940), Australian cricketer
- Alfred Clarke (Nottinghamshire cricketer) (1831–1878), English cricketer
- Alfred Clarke (Surrey cricketer) (1865–1935), English cricketer
- Alfie Clarke (footballer) (1914–1953), Welsh footballer
- Alfred E. Clarke Mansion, a Victorian house in San Francisco, California
- Alfred Henry Clarke (1860–1942), Canadian politician
- Alfred Rutter Clarke (1867–1932), Australian stockbroker and investor

== See also ==
- Alfie Clarke (disambiguation)
