= Roger Clark =

Roger Clark may refer to:

- Roger Clark (rally driver) (1939–1998), British rally driver
- Roger Clark (actor, born 1908) (1908–1978), American actor
- Roger Clark (actor, born 1978), Irish-American actor

== See also ==
- Roger Clarke (disambiguation)
