= Samuel Clarke of St Albans =

English Nonconformist pastor (1684–1750)

Samuel Clark (1684–1750), usually known as Samuel Clarke of St Albans, was an English Nonconformist pastor and theological writer, known for his Collection of the Promises of Scripture. He is not to be confused with his near-contemporary Samuel Clarke (1675–1729), philosopher and Anglican clergyman.

== Life ==
Samuel Clarke was born on 16 December 1684 at Chelsea, into an extended family of clergy. His father Benjamin Clarke (1653–1722) was the youngest son of Daniel Clarke (1609–1654), vicar of Kirkburton in Yorkshire, brother of Samuel Clarke (1599–1683), the Puritan biographer. Benjamin had married Elizabeth (1656–1736), daughter of his first cousin Samuel Clarke (1626–1701), annotator of the Bible. After reading the works of the elder Samuel Clark, who was both his paternal great-uncle and maternal great-grandfather, he went through a course of preparation for the ministry.

Clarke declined preferment in the Church of England, on grounds of conscience, as a Dissenter. He became the pastor of a Nonconformist congregation in Dagnall Lane, St Albans (now Lower Dagnall Street). The first charity school outside London, in connection with a dissenting congregation, was instituted by Clarke about 1715, giving free education in reading, writing, and arithmetic to thirty boys and ten girls (see Dissenting academies).

Clarke was on intimate terms with Isaac Watts, Job Orton, and Philip Doddridge, the last of whom he had informally adopted as a recently orphaned thirteen-year-old. The four men were of the same theological school. It was in going to preach Clarke's funeral sermon that Doddridge is said to have caught the illness which caused his death. Clarke is thought to have suggested to Doddridge some of the books which he published; in particular, his Principles of the Christian Religion. Clarke was awarded the degree of Doctor of Divinity by the University of Glasgow in March 1744, 'on the united testimony of Dr Watts, Dr Guise,' and Dr Doddridge. On Sunday 2 December 1750, whilst administering the Lord's Supper in his Dagnall Street chapel, Clarke suffered a stroke. He died two days later.

== Works ==
Clarke published some sermons, but is remembered for his Collection of the Promises of Scripture, arranged systematically. It is a compilation, often reprinted, and was an enduring popular religious volume.

== Family ==
Clarke married Sarah Jones, of St Albans (1701–1757), by whom he had sons Samuel (1727–1769) and Thomas (1730–1742), and daughters Ann (1733–1804), who married Rev Jabez Hirons (1727–1812), who succeeded Clark as minister at Dagnall Lane; Elizabeth, who married Ralph Griffiths, editor of the Monthly Review; and Sarah, who married William Rose, schoolmaster of Chiswick.
