= Matthew Clark (disambiguation) =

Matthew Clark is a United Kingdom-based drinks distributor.

Matthew or Matt Clark may also refer to:

- Mat Clark (born 1990), Canadian ice hockey defenceman
- Matt Clark (actor) (1936–2026), American actor and director
- Matt Clark (baseball) (born 1986), American baseball first baseman
- Matt Clark (darts player) (born 1968), English darts player
- Matt Clark (footballer) (born 1992), English football midfielder
- Matt Clark (Canadian football) (born 1968), Canadian football player
- Matt Clark (writer) (1967–1998), short story writer and novelist
- Matt Clark (The Young and the Restless), a fictional character from the American CBS soap opera The Young and the Restless
- Matthew H. Clark (1937–2023), American prelate of the Roman Catholic Church
- Matthew Clark, American drummer in Ostinato, Premonition 13, and White Rabbits

== See also ==
- Matt Clarke (disambiguation)
- Matthew Clerk (1659–1735), Irish Presbyterian minister
