= List of mayors of Chesterfield =

The office of Mayor of Chesterfield in Derbyshire, has existed since 1598 when Queen Elizabeth issued a charter to the town, granting the town the right to have a mayor. The first holder of this position was Ralph Clarke. This charter is on display in the Chesterfield Museum and Art Gallery.

Prior to 1933 when the Local Government Act 1933 came into effect, any local citizen could hold the position, following this act only elected councillors could become mayor.

In 1974, a new charter issued by Queen Elizabeth II was granted when Staveley and Brimington where added to the borough to form the Chesterfield Borough Council.

== Office-holders ==
- 1598 Ralph Clarke
- 1599 Godfrey Heathcote
- 1600–1601 Thomas Rayneshaw
- 1602–1605 Thomas Heathcote
- 1606 Godfrey Heathcote
- 1607 Thomas Woodward
- 1608–1609 Martin Bretland
- 1610 Godfrey Heathcote
- 1611 Nicholas Webster
- 1612–1613 Ralph Wheeldon
- 1614–1617 William Boot
- 1618 Godfrey Heathcote
- 1619 Ralph Wheeldon
- 1620–1621 Godfrey Webster
- 1622 William Boot
- 1623 Richard Taylor
- 1624–1625 Godfrey Heathcote
- 1626 Richard Milnes
- 1627 Reynold Bretland
- 1628 George Dickons
- 1629 Ralph Clarke
- 1630 Richard Taylor
- 1631 Thomas Forth
- 1632 Godfrey Heathcote
- 1633 William Clarke
- 1634 Reynold Bretland
- 1635 Ralph Clarke
- 1636-7 Richard Taylor
- 1638 William Newton
- 1639–1644 George Dickons
- 1645 Reynold Bretland
- 1646 Thomas Forth
- 1647 Thomas Bretland
- 1648 Ralph Clarke
- 1649 Richard Wood
- 1650 William Newton
- 1651 Samuel Taylor
- 1652 Reynold Bretland
- 1653 Thomas Forth
- 1654 Hercules Clay
- 1655 Ralph Clarke
- 1656 Richard Wood
- 1657 Gabriel Wain, Captain
- 1658 William Newton
- 1659 Thomas Forth
- 1660 Thomas Needham
- 1661 Hercules Clay, removed 25 September 1662 and John Allwood installed
- 1662 John Allwood
- 1663 Richard Marchant
- 1664 James Milnes
- 1665 Thomas Pinder
- 1666 Anthony Legate
- 1667 Richard Marchant
- 1668 John Woodward
- 1669 James Milnes
- 1670 Richard Clarke
- 1671 Thomas Bretland
- 1672 Peter Dowker
- 1673 Richard Youle
- 1674 Richard Marchant
- 1675 John Woodward
- 1676 James Milnes
- 1677 Richard Clarke
- 1678 Peter Dowker
- 1679 Richard Coupe
- 1680 Richard Youle
- 1681 Richard Marchant
- 1682 John Woodward
- 1683 Thomas Dowker
- 1684 Robert Stringfellow
- 1685 Peter Dowker
- 1686 Richard Coupe
- 1687 Richard Youle
- 1688 Francis Houldsworth
- 1689 John Woodward
- 1690 Thomas Dowker
- 1691 Francis Moore
- 1692 John Ashe
- 1693 Roger Coates
- 1694 John Milnes
- 1695 David Seale
- 1696 Richard Youle
- 1697 Thomas Webster
- 1698 Francis Moore
- 1699 John Revell
- 1700 John Ashe
- 1701 Jacob Breilsford
- 1702 Thomas Bower
- 1703 Richard Wood
- 1704 David Seale
- 1705 Francis Moore
- 1706 John Revell
- 1707 John Bright
- 1708 Jacob Breilsford
- 1709 Thomas Bower
- 1710 Richard Wood
- 1711 David Seale
- 1712 William Woodhouse
- 1713 John Revell
- 1714 John Bright
- 1715 William Clarke
- 1716 Christophe Pegge
- 1717 Jacob Breilsford
- 1718 William Sharshaw
- 1719 Job Bradley
- 1720 John Revell
- 1721 John Bright
- 1722 William Clarke
- 1723 Christopher Pegge (died in January 1724 before completing term)
- 1724 John Revell
- 1724 Samuel Inman
- 1725 Job Bradley
- 1726 John Bright
- 1727 Thomas Bower
- 1728 John Revell
- 1729 William Clark
- 1730 Samuel Inman
- 1731 Job Bradley
- 1732 John Bright
- 1733 Francis Bagshaw
- 1734 Richard Milnes
- 1735 William Clark
- 1736 Samuel Inman
- 1737 John Burton
- 1738 Job Bradley
- 1739 Francis Bagshaw
- 1740 Joshua Jebb
- 1741 Bernard Lucas
- 1742 Job Bradley
- 1743 William Clark
- 1744 Job Bradley
- 1745 Francis Bagshaw
- 1746 John Fidler
- 1747 Robert Watts
- 1748 Joshua Jebb
- 1749 William Saunders
- 1750 Henry Thornhill
- 1751 John Fidler
- 1752 Robert Watts
- 1753 Joshua Jebb
- 1754 William Saunders
- 1755 Henry Thornhill
- 1756 John Fidler
- 1757 Joshua Jebb
- 1758 William Saunders
- 1759 Henry Thornhill
- 1760 Joshua Jebb
- 1761 Nicholas Twigg
- 1762 Thomas Clark
- 1763 Godfrey Webster
- 1764 Joshua Jebb
- 1765 Nicholas Twigg
- 1766 Thomas Clark
- 1767 Samuel Towndrow
- 1768 Charles Staniforth
- 1769 Samuel Jebb
- 1770 Joshua Jebb
- 1771 No Mayor elected; Writ of Mandamus issued 8 July 1772 to compel election; Nicholas Twigg elected 15 July.
- 1772 Robert Jennings
- 1773 William Barker
- 1774 Samuel Towndrow
- 1775 John Willot
- 1776 Thomas Short
- 1777 Robert Jennings
- 1778 Samuel Towndrow
- 1779 John Elam
- 1780 Thomas Short
- 1781 Robert Marsden
- 1782 John Elam
- 1783 John Bale
- 1784 John Elam
- 1785 Thomas Dutton
- 1786 John Bale
- 1787 Thomas Dutton
- 1788 Mark Hewitt
- 1789 John Bale
- 1790 Thomas Dutton
- 1791 Job Bradley
- 1792 Thomas Dutton
- 1793 John Elam
- 1794 Job Bradley
- 1795 John Elam
- 1796 John Bower
- 1797 Thomas Dutton
- 1798 John Bower
- 1799 John Saxton
- 1800 Thomas Dutton
- 1801 John Bower
- 1802 Thomas Dutton
- 1803 John Bower
- 1804 John Elam
- 1805 Thomas Dutton
- 1806 John Bower
- 1807 John Elam
- 1808 Thomas Dutton
- 1809 John Bower
- 1810 George Fletcher
- 1811 John Elam
- 1812 Thomas Dutton
- 1813 John Bower
- 1814 John Elam
- 1815 Joseph Graham
- 1816 John Muggleston
- 1817 John Elam
- 1818 Samuel Dutton
- 1819 Joseph Graham
- 1820 Samuel Dutton
- 1821 John Elam
- 1822 John Muggleston
- 1823 Gilbert Crompton
- 1824 Samuel Dutton
- 1825 John Elam
- 1826 George Fletcher
- 1827 John Muggleston
- 1828 Thomas Wilcockson
- 1829 William Battison
- 1830 Samuel Dutton
- 1831 John Muggleston
- 1832 William Battison
- 1833 Samuel Dutton
- 1834 Thomas Wilcockson
- 1835 Thomas Wilcockson to November, then Gilbert Crompton
- 1836 John Charge
- 1837 Gilbert Crompton
- 1838 Samuel Dutton
- 1839 Edmund Gilling Maynard
- 1840 Robert Daniel
- 1841 Gilbert Crompton
- 1842 Samuel Dutton
- 1843 Thomas Clark
- 1844 John Gregory Cottingham
- 1845 Samuel Dutton
- 1846 Edmund Gilling Maynard
- 1847 John Gilbert Crompton
- 1848 John Gregory Cottingham
- 1849 John Walker
- 1850 Godfrey Heathcote
- 1851 Edmund Gilling Maynard
- 1852 John Walker
- 1853-4 William Drabble
- 1855 William Hewitt
- 1856 William Drabble
- 1857 William Hewitt
- 1858 Charles Stanhope Burke Busby
- 1859–1860 Joseph Shipton
- 1861 William Drabble
- 1862 Thomas Jones
- 1863 Cornelius Black
- 1864 James Ball White
- 1865 James Wright
- 1866–1867 Charles Stanhope Burke Busby
- 1868 James Ball White
- 1869–1870 James Wright
- 1871–1872 John Marsden
- 1873 Thomas Philpot Wood
- 1874 George Albert Rooth
- 1875 James Wright & George Albert Rooth
- 1876 John Marsden
- 1877 John Drabble
- 1878 Theophilus Pearson
- 1879–1880 John Brown
- 1881 John Brown to May, then John Higginbottom
- 1882 John Higginbottom
- 1883–1884 George Edward Gee
- 1885–1886 Thomas Philpot Wood
- 1887 George Booth
- 1888 Bowery Douglas
- 1889 Edward Woodhead
- 1890–1892 John Morton Clayton
- 1893–1894 William Bradbury Robinson
- 1895 Adam Clarke Locke
- 1896 Charles Paxton Markham
- 1897 James Pearson
- 1898 Bowery Douglas
- 1899–1901 William Spooner
- 1902 Charles Portland Robinson
- 1903 James Pearson
- 1904 Arthur Ernest Hopkins
- 1905–1907 George Albert Eastwood
- 1908 Samuel Edward Short
- 1909–1910 Charles Paxton Markham
- 1911 Victor Cavendish, 9th Duke of Devonshire
- 1912 William Bradbury Robinson
- 1913–1918 Ernest Shentall
- 1919–1920 Wilfred Hawksley Edmunds
- 1921 William Rhodes
- 1922 George Clark
- 1923–1924 William Edmund Wakerley
- 1925–1926 Harry Cropper
- 1927 Violet Rosa Markham
- 1928 Philip Moffat Robinson
- 1929–1930 Herbert Jowett Watson
- 1931 Thomas Dennis Sims
- 1932 Arthur Whiteley Swale
- 1933 Robert Anderson McCrea
- 1934 Harry Varley
- 1935 Harry Pearson Short
- 1936 George Frank Kirk
- 1937 Harry Hatton
- 1938 Samuel Thomas Rodgers
- 1939 James William Thompson
- 1940 Walter Wicks
- 1941 Sydney Ashton Syddall
- 1942 William Baines
- 1943 Edgar Thomas Styler
- 1944 William Edwin Taylor
- 1945 Thomas Joseph Mitchell
- 1946 Florence Robinson
- 1947–1948 Edgar Smith
- 1949 John Eaton Bird
- 1950 William Porter
- 1951 George William Heathcote
- 1952 Frank Hadfield
- 1953 Edwin Swale
- 1954 Leonard Wilkinson
- 1955 Henry Charles Day
- 1956 William Weston
- 1957 Hiram Tagg
- 1958 Levi Heath
- 1959 John Leslie Hadfield
- 1960 Harold Charles Mullett
- 1961 Harry Cantrell Martin
- 1962 Ernest Bradbury Robinson
- 1963 James Anderson
- 1964 Edward Cyril Hancock
- 1965 Tom Bucknall
- 1966 Annie Collishaw
- 1967 George Albert Wigfield
- 1968 George Henry Rees
- 1969 Victor Stuart Allen
- 1970 Elizabeth Mary Turner
- 1971 Basil Crosbie Willett
- 1972 John Ford
- 1973 Lois Tideswell
- 1974 Harold Barber Fisher
- 1975 John Wickins
- 1976 Walter Everett
- 1977 William Gorman
- 1978 Patrick Edward Kelly
- 1979 Margaret Wyper Anderson
- 1980 Stanley Meakin
- 1981 Cissie Sargeant
- 1982 Donald Arthur Wain
- 1983 Ronald Jepson
- 1984 Michael Gabriel Caulfield
- 1985 Thomas Edmund Whyatt
- 1986 William Smith
- 1987 Edwin Harold Barker
- 1988 John Smith
- 1989 Leslie McCulloch
- 1990 Arthur Webber
- 1991 William Jepson
- 1992 Terence Kendellen
- 1993 George Arthur Wright
- 1994 Richard Albert Matthews
- 1995 David Stone
- 1996 Geoffrey Waddoups
- 1997 Margaret Ann Higgins
- 1998 Michael Lancelot Fanshawe
- 1999 Terence Frank Gilby
- 2000 Michael Leverton
- 2001 James McManus
- 2002 Paul Najid Al Rahman Barry
- 2003 June Isabel Beckingham
- 2004 Asad Shafi Qazi
- 2005 Keith Falconer
- 2006 Trudi Mulcaster
- 2007 Christine Ludlow
- 2008 Fred Quayle
- 2009 Adrian Kitch
- 2010 Keith P Morgan
- 2011 Peter I Barr
- 2012 Donald Parsons
- 2013 Paul Christopher Stone
- 2014 Alexis Saliou Diouf
- 2015 Barry Bingham
- 2016 Steve Brunt
- 2017 Maureen Davenport
- 2018 Stuart Brittain
- 2019 Gordon Simmons
- 2020 Glenys Falconer
- 2021 Glenys Falconer
- 2022 Tony Rogers
- 2023 Mick Brady
- 2024 Jenny Flood
- 2025 Barry Dyke
