= Sarah Clark =

Sarah Clark may refer to:

- Sarah Clark (bishop) (born 1965), British Anglican bishop
- Sarah Clark (judoka) (born 1978), British judoka
- Sarah Clark (politician), member of the New York State Assembly
- Sarah Clark (soccer) (born 1999), American soccer player
- Sarah Knauss, née Clark, American supercentenarian, and oldest person ever from the United States

== See also ==
- Sarah Clarke (disambiguation)
