= Sarah Clarke (disambiguation) =

Sarah Clarke (born 1972) is an American actress.

Sarah Clarke may also refer to:

- Sarah Clarke (nun) (1919–2002), Irish nun and civil rights campaigner
- Sarah Clarke (journalist), Northern Irish journalist
- Sarah Clarke (cricketer) (born 1982), English cricketer
- Sarah Clarke (Black Rod) (born 1965), English administrator and Lady Usher of the Black Rod
- Sarah Anne Freeman Clarke, American painter
- Sarah-Jane Clarke, Australian fashion designer
- Sarah Clarke (cardiologist), British doctor
- Sarah Clarke, Minneapolis attorney and wife of mayor Jacob Frey

== See also ==
- Sarah Clark (disambiguation)
