= Samuel Clarke (annotator) =

English Nonconformist clergyman

Samuel Clarke or Clark (1626–1701) was an English Nonconformist clergyman known as an assiduous annotator of the Bible.

== Life ==
He was the eldest son of Samuel Clarke (1599–1683), and was born at Shotwick, near Chester, on 12 November 1626. He was educated at Peterhouse, Cambridge; and was appointed fellow of Pembroke Hall by Edward Montagu, 2nd Earl of Manchester on 13 March 1644. Refusing to take the engagement of fidelity to the Commonwealth, exacted in April 1649, he was deprived of his fellowship in 1651 (after 3 April).

At the Restoration he held the rectory of Grendon Underwood, Buckinghamshire. He was ejected after the Act of Uniformity 1662.

The son was more advanced than his father in his nonconformity. After a sojourn at Upper Winchendon, Buckinghamshire, the seat of Philip Wharton, 4th Baron Wharton, he settled at High Wycombe, in the same county. There he gathered a congregation, originally Presbyterian, by then independent. He assisted in the ordinations which kept up the succession of nonconformist ministers. Clarke died at High Wycombe on 24 February 1701. Samuel Clarke (1684–1750) of the Scripture Promises was his grandson.

== Works ==
His theology was of the Baxterian type. The work of his life was his annotated edition of the Bible, published in 1696. This was already planned by him as an undergraduate; the notes are brief. The work had the approval of John Owen, Richard Baxter, Philip Doddridge, George Whitefield, and William Cleaver.

He published, besides separate sermons:

- ‘The Old and New Testaments, with Annotations and Parallel Scriptures,’ &c. 1690, fol., reprinted 1760, and Glasgow, 1765; in Welsh, 1813.
- ‘An Abridgement of the Historical Parts of the Old and New Testament,’ 1690.
- ‘A Survey of the Bible; or an Analytical Account of the Holy Scriptures by chapter and verse,’ &c., 1693 (intended as a supplement to the ‘Annotations’).
- ‘A Brief Concordance,’ &c. 1696.
- ‘Of Scandal’ (a treatise on the limits of obedience to human authority).
- ‘An Exercitation concerning the original of the Chapters and Verses in the Bible, wherein the divine authority of the Points in the Hebrew text is clearly proved,’ &c., 1698.
- ‘Scripture-Justification,’ &c., 1698, (written ‘almost twenty years’ before; Baxter had expressed a wish for its publication, but it was sent to press by John Humfrey, to whom Clarke had lent the manuscript on being asked for his opinion of Humfrey's ‘Righteousness of God,’ 1697).
- ‘The Divine Authority of the Scriptures asserted,’ &c., 1699, (in reply to Richard Simon and others; Clarke extends inspiration to the verse divisions as well as to the points in the Old Testament).
