= Robert Cruttenden =

Robert Cruttenden (1690–1763), was an English merchant, Methodist and hymn-writer. Director of the East Indian company

== Early life ==
He was the son of Joseph Cruttenden (c.1658 – after 1731), a wholesale apothecary in London. He was educated to follow his uncle Rev Robert Bragge (1665–1738) into the Dissenting ministry, but decided he was unsuited because of his Arianism. Instead, in 1717 Cruttenden became a bookseller and broker, setting up shop near the Mercers' Chapel in Cheapside, London, before making and losing a fortune in the South Sea Bubble speculation. He went bankrupt in 1721, and moved to Finsbury. He was a friend of Philip Doddridge of Northampton, with whom he exchanged visits. Cruttenden wrote some poems, published after his death, translated a French version of Pindar's Ode to Prosperina (London, 1738), and wrote The principles and preaching of the Methodists considered (London, 1753).

== Conversion to Methodism ==
Cruttenden became a friend of Methodist George Whitefield in 1742, after hearing John Cennick preach at the recently built wooden Tabernacle. He rejoined the Calvinistic Lime Street Independent chapel, near Leadenhall Market, where Robert Bragge had been pastor; becoming a lay elder. Here he experienced a spiritual conversion, which was described in print by Whitefield, attracting interest and criticism. Cruttenden wrote seven or so hymns, published after his death: 'And is it yet, dear Lord, a doubt?' 'Did Jesus die, but not for me?’ ‘I own my guilt, my sins confess;' 'Let others boast their ancient line;' 'Rise, Sun of glory, shine reveal'd;' ' 'Tis false, thou vile accuser, go;' 'What adverse powers we feel within.'

== Family ==
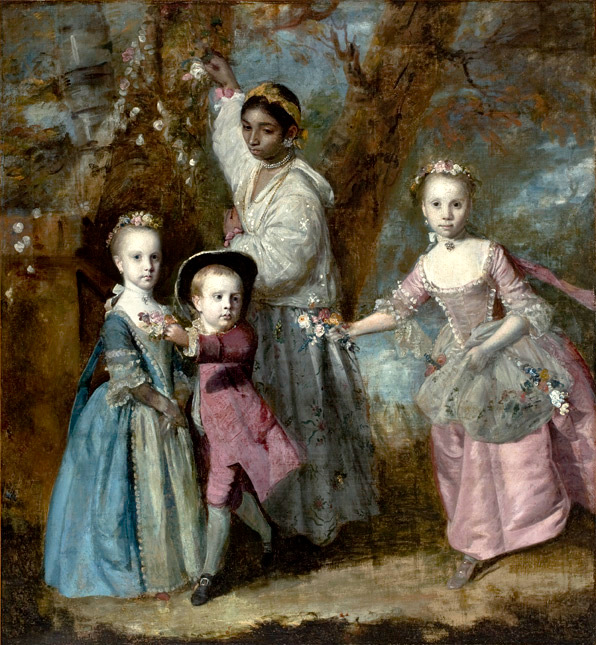
Cruttenden's grandchildren by his son Edward, with their ayah

Cruttenden married Sarah Cliff at the chapel of Saint Aske’s Hospital (almhouses), Hoxton, 3 September 1716. The couple had three children: Edward Holden Cruttenden (1717-1771), an East India Company director; Joseph Cruttenden, an attorney and Clerk to the Royal College of Surgeons, 1745–80; and Sarah Elizabeth Cruttenden (1725-1811), who married the surgeon Sir Percivall Pott. Through them, he had grandchildren, some of whom were painted by Sir Joshua Reynolds. Cruttenden died 23 June 1763, and was buried in a private vault in Bunhill Fields, 1 July 1763.
