= Philip Clarke =

Philip Clarke may refer to:

== Sports ==
- Phil Clarke (born 1971), English rugby league player
- Phil Clarke (American football) (born 1977), American football player
- Phil Clarke (rugby union) (born 1942), New Zealand rugby union player
- Phil Clarke (speedway rider) (1922–2010), English speedway rider

== Others ==
- Philip Clarke (Royal Navy officer) (1898–1966), British admiral
- Philip Clarke (politician) (1933–1995), Irish Republican Army member and politician
- Philip L. Clarke (1938–2013), American voice actor
- Philip Clarke (businessman) (born 1960), British businessman
- Several of the Clarke baronets were called Philip Clarke
- Phil Clarke (TV producer) (born 1961), British comedy producer & television executive

== See also ==
- Philip Clark (disambiguation)
- Clarke (surname)
