= Malcolm Clark =

Malcolm Clark may refer to:

- Malcolm Clark (musician), Australian musician
- Malcolm Clark (cricketer) (born 1929), South African cricketer
- Malcolm Clark (priest) (1905–2002), Dean of Edinburgh
- Malcolm Clark, one of the founders of LGB Alliance

== See also ==
- Malcolm Clarke (disambiguation)
