= Upper Winchendon =

Village in Aylesbury Dale district of Buckinghamshire, England

Coordinates: 51.8227°N 0.9181°W

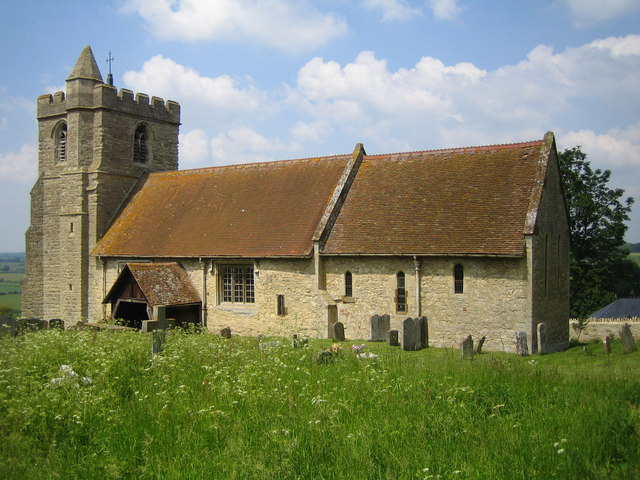
- St Mary Magdalene parish church

- Location within Buckinghamshire
- Population: 87 (Mid-2010 pop est)
- OS grid reference: SP745145
- Civil parish: Upper Winchendon
- Unitary authority: Buckinghamshire
- Ceremonial county: Buckinghamshire
- Region: South East
- Country: England
- Sovereign state: United Kingdom
- Post town: Aylesbury
- Postcode district: HP18
- Dialling code: 01296
- Police: Thames Valley
- Fire: Buckinghamshire
- Ambulance: South Central
- UK Parliament: Mid Buckinghamshire

Upper Winchendon or Over Winchendon is a village and civil parish in the Aylesbury Vale District of Buckinghamshire, England. It is about 1.5 miles (2.4 km) south of Waddesdon and 4.5 miles (7 km) west of Aylesbury. A mid-air collision on 17 November 2017 between a plane and a helicopter just outside the village was referred to by much of the press as the "Waddesdon Manor air incident".

== Name ==
The name "Winchendon" is derived from the Old English for "hill at a bend". Collectively the villages of Upper Winchendon and Nether Winchendon (or Lower Winchendon) were called Wichendone.

== Manor ==
The manor of Upper Winchendon was held by St Frideswide's Priory in Oxford, to whom it was given by King Henry I. After the suppression of the convent in the Dissolution of the Monasteries the manor was given to Cardinal Wolsey, but was seized by the Crown shortly afterwards, in 1530, along with Wolsey's other estates.

In 1623 the manor was granted by the Crown to the Goodwin family, who enlarged the manor house into a mansion. It then passed into the Wharton family, one of whom was made the Duke of Wharton in 1718 for his services to the Crown. He later had all his possessions seized for being a supporter of the Young Pretender (Bonnie Prince Charlie). The house fell into disrepair thereafter and has since been demolished.

== Notable people ==
In birth order.

- Cardinal Wolsey (1473–1530), cardinal and politician, was briefly lord of the manor up to 1530, when he fell from favour.
- Sir Francis Goodwin (1564–1634), politician, was lord of the manor of Upper Winchendon and an MP for Buckinghamshire.
- Arthur Goodwin (died 1643), lawyer and Parliamentarian, was lord of the manor of Upper Winchendon.
- Philip Wharton, 4th Baron Wharton (1613–1696), soldier, Parliamentarian and art collector, gained the manor of Upper Winchendon through his second wife, Jane Goodwin, only daughter of Arthur Goodwin. He and other family were painted by Anthony van Dyck.
- Samuel Clarke (1626–1701), nonconformist minister and Biblical scholar, spent 26 years in Upper Winchendon under the auspices of Philip Wharton, after ejection from the rectory of Grendon Underwood in 1662, and set up on an Independent congregation there.
- Thomas Wharton, 1st Marquess of Wharton (1648–1714), Whig politician, rake and Lord Lieutenant of Ireland, was the eldest son of Philip Wharton. The lyrics of the marching song "Lillibullero" are attributed to him. He was buried at Upper Winchendon.
- Goodwin Wharton (1653–1704), Whig politician and autobiographer, was born in Upper Winchendon on 8 March 1653 as third son of Philip Wharton.
- Anne Wharton (1659–1685), wife of Thomas Wharton, was a poet and dramatist.

== 2017 mid-air collision ==
On 17 November 2017, a mid-air collision occurred between an aeroplane and a helicopter near Waddesdon Manor, resulting in four deaths, two on each aircraft. The crash happened just outside the Manor grounds, close to the village of Upper Winchendon. The wreckage landed in dense woodland. Emergency services were called at 12:06 GMT. Seven fire vehicles, the Thames Valley air ambulance, two ambulances, and a rapid response vehicle attended.

The crash involved a Cessna 152 registration G-WACG, and a Guimbal Cabri G2 registration G-JAMM, each with two people on board. Both aircraft had come from Wycombe Air Park, 23 miles (37 km) from the crash site. The Cessna had previously been involved in an incident in 1993.

The pilot of the helicopter was Mike Green, an instructor who was training a student pilot at the time. The student pilot was later announced as being a captain in the Vietnamese Army, who was training to become a military flight instructor. The bodies of all four victims were removed from the site on 19 November.

Thames Valley Police stated that the Air Accidents Investigation Branch (AAIB) had been informed. Military support was provided to assist with recovery of the wreckage of the two aircraft, which was dispatched to the AAIB's headquarters at Farnborough Airport, Hampshire.
