= Ronald Clark =

Ronald, Ron or Ronnie Clark may refer to:

== Sports ==
- Ronald Clark (cricketer) (Ronald Disston Clark, 1895–1983), English first-class cricketer
- Ron Clark (long-distance runner) (born 1930), British runner
- Ronnie Clark (1932–2013), Scottish footballer
- Ron Clark (baseball) (Ronald Bruce Clark, born 1943), American MLB baseball infielder
- Ron Clark (sprinter) (born 1969), American sprinter

== Other ==
- Ronald W. Clark (1916–1987), British author of biography, fiction, and non-fiction
- Ronald P. Clark, United States Army general
- Ron Clark Ball (born 1959), American thriller- and suspense novelist
- Ron Clark (writer) (active from 1963), American playwright and screenwriter
- Ron Clark (judge) (born 1953), United States federal judge
- Ron Clark (teacher) (born 1972), American educator who has worked with disadvantaged students; Survivor contestant
  - The Ron Clark Story, a 2006 film about the teacher
- Ronnie Clark, a pseudonym used by musician Herbie Hancock

== See also ==
- Roland Clark (disambiguation)
- Ronald Clarke (disambiguation)
- Ronald Clark O'Bryan (AKA The Candy Man and The Man Who Killed Halloween, 1944–1984), American murderer
