= Roland Clark =

Roland Clark may refer to:

- Roland Clark (DJ), American house music DJ, producer, songwriter and vocalist
- Roland Clark (painter) (1874–1957), American painter
- Roland E. Clark (1911–1972), American medical doctor suspected of being a serial killer

== See also ==
- Ronald Clark (disambiguation)
