= Troy Clarke =

Troy Clarke may refer to:

- Troy Clarke (Australian rules footballer) (1969–2013), AFL footballer
- Troy Clarke (rugby league) (born 1967), NRL player
