= Donald C. Clark Sr. =

- Born: Donald Cameron Clark; August 9, 1931; Brooklyn, New York, U.S.
- Died: November 28, 2020 (aged 89); Lake Forest, Illinois, U.S.
- Education: Clarkson University (BS); Northwestern University (MBA)
- Occupation(s): Corporate executive, professor, investor
- Known for: Finance, business, philanthropy

Donald Cameron Clark (August 9, 1931 – November 28, 2020) was an American businessman and philanthropist who was chairman of the board and chief executive officer of Household International, a former Fortune 100 company and one of the nation's leading consumer financial services companies.

== Life and career ==
Donald C. Clark served as the Chief Executive Officer of Household International from 1982 until September 1994. Clark joined Household International in 1955, directly out of the United States Army, and held numerous executive positions before serving as President from 1977 to 1982, CEO from 1982 to 1994, and Chairman of Household International from 1984 to 1996.

Clark served as a board member for many Fortune 500 corporations, not-for-profit organizations, academic institutions, and private investment groups. Some of his titles included: Chairman of the Board of Trustees of Clarkson University, Director of AT&T Teleholdings, Life Director of Evanston Northwestern Healthcare, Life Trustee of Northwestern University, Director at Evanston Hospital, Director of The Chicago Council on Foreign Relations, Director of Ripplewood Holdings, Director of The Lyric Opera of Chicago, Chairman of Household International, Chairman of Scotsman Industries, Chairman of National Car Rental, Director of Warner-Lambert Company, Director of Procter & Gamble, Director of Ameritech Corporation, Director of Armstrong World Industries, Director of ExTerra LLC, Director of Ripplewood Holdings, Governing Member of the Chicago Symphony Orchestra, and Director of PMI Group.

Described by Business Week as "a career executive who knows the company inside and out," Clark was later lauded in the magazine's 1989 special issue as one of the nation's corporate elite, "the people who run America's most powerful and most valuable companies." He was also lauded for his talent in guiding Household International through the turbulent business climate of the 1980s.

Clark was a member of The Economic Club of Chicago, The Commercial Club of Chicago, Mid-America Club, and The Chicago Club.

In 1985, during his tenure at Household International, Clark led one of the first major implementations of the poison pill strategy, leading to the first court cases to examine the legal merits of this strategy.

Clark died on November 28, 2020, at the age of 89.

== Education ==
After serving in the United States Army as an officer, Clark received a degree in business administration from Clarkson University (1953) and an MBA degree from Kellogg Graduate School of Management at Northwestern University (1961). After graduating from the Executive MBA program at Kellogg, they quickly invited Clark back to teach courses in finance and corporate strategy.

== Awards ==
- Golden Knight Award (1978)
- Renascence Award from Holy Family Hospital (1988)
- Honorary Doctor of Science degree from Clarkson University (1990)
- Business Hall of Fame by the Junior Achievement of Chicago (1990)
- Citizen of the Year by the Gateway Foundation (1991)
- National Humanitarian Award from the National Conference of Christians and Jews (1991)
