= Samuel Clarke (dean of Clonmacnoise) =

Anglican priest in Ireland

Samuel Clarke was an Anglican priest in Ireland during the 17th century.

Clarke was educated at Trinity College, Dublin. Clarke was ordained deacon on 19 April 1619 and priest on 11 April 1620. He was Dean of Clonmacnoise from 1633 until 1634.
