= Alfie Clarke =

Alfie Clarke may refer to:

- Alfie Clarke (footballer) (1914–1953), Welsh footballer
- Alfie Clark (born 2004), English footballer
- Alfie Clarke (actor) (born 2007), English actor

== See also ==
- Alfred Clarke (disambiguation)
