= Nigel Clarke =

Nigel Clarke or Clark may refer to:

- Nigel Clarke (composer) (born 1960), British composer and musician
- Nigel A. L. Clarke (born 1971), Jamaican politician
- Nigel Clark (musician) (born 1966), English singer and musician of the band Dodgy
- Nigel Clark (pentathlete) (born 1956), British modern pentathlete
- Nigel Stafford-Clark (born 1948), British film- and television producer
