= Roger Clarke (ornithologist) =

English ornithologist

- Born: 8 July 1952; Bedford, England
- Died: 28 January 2007 (aged 54); Reach, Cambridgeshire, England
- Education: Bedford Modern School; University of Liverpool
- Known for: Ornithology

Roger Geoffrey Clarke (8 July 1952 – 28 January 2007), was an English ornithologist and authority on harriers and other birds of prey.

== Early life ==
Roger Geoffrey Clarke was born on 8 July 1952 in Bedford, England. He was educated at Bedford Modern School and later qualified as a chartered accountant which he practiced for the rest of his life while still pursuing his main interest as an ornithologist.

Clarke was said to have been 'vaguely interested in birds from his youth' but he was keener on playing lead guitar in a rock band until hearing damage ended his musical career. It was in fact a love of angling that steered him towards ornithology. In 1981 he moved to Reach in Cambridgeshire to fish pike and bream and would watch hen harriers hunting over the landscape.

== Ornithological work ==
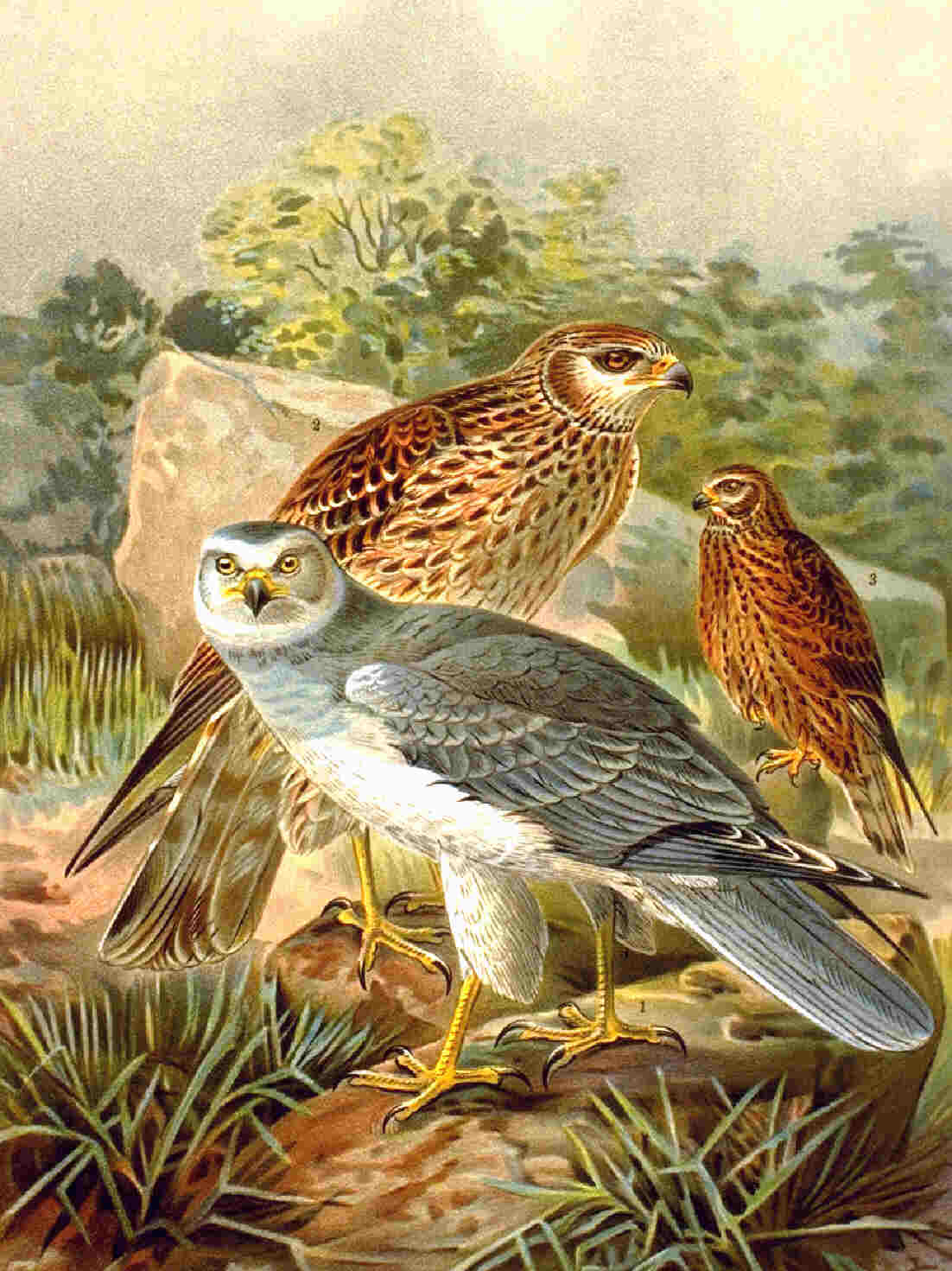
Henharrier

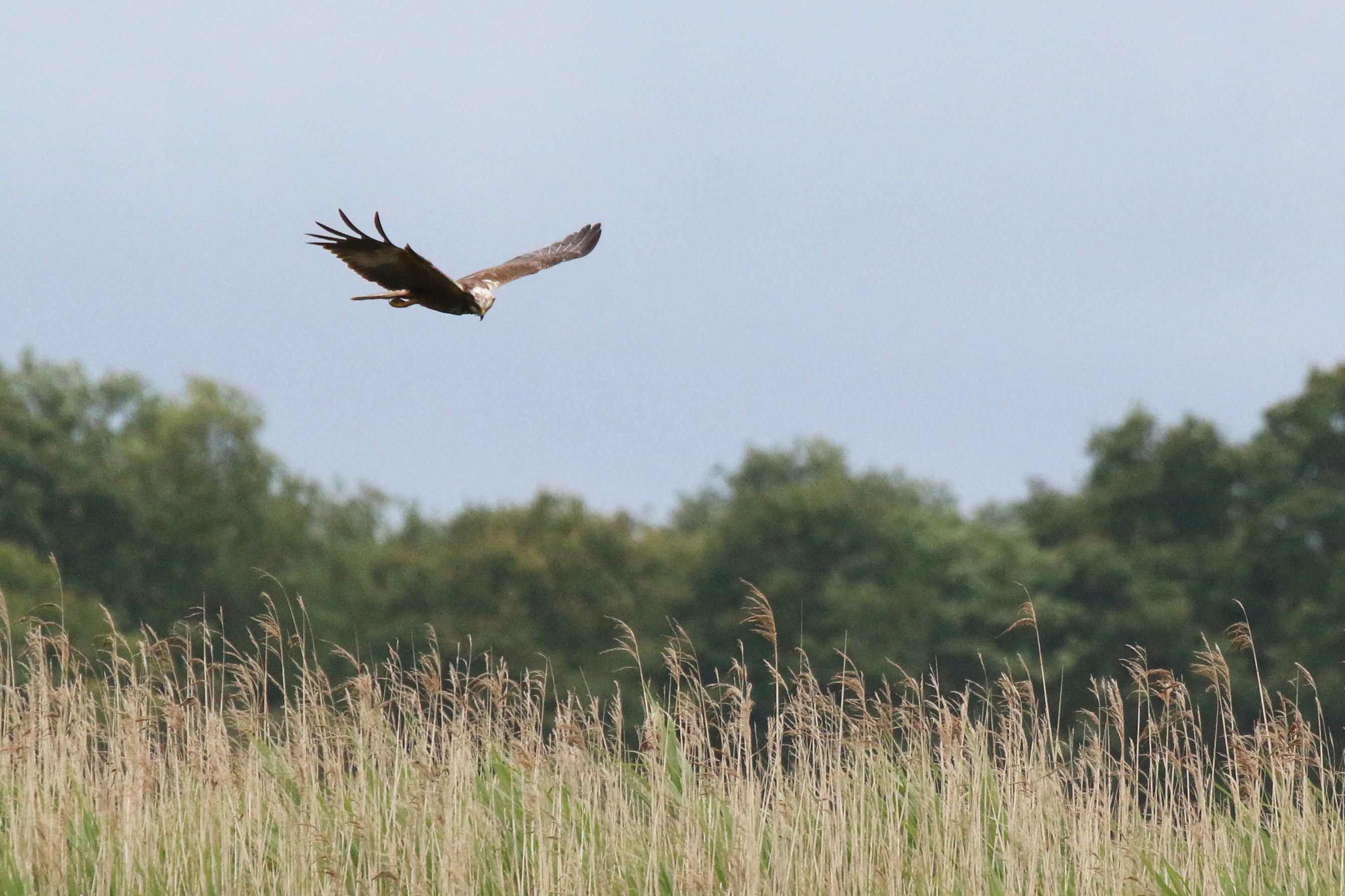
Marsh harrier (Circus aeruginosus) female

Two years later he teamed up with the artist Donald Watson to develop the UK Hen Harrier Winter Roost Survey. The thesis for Clarke's PhD in biological sciences, awarded by the University of Liverpool in 1999, was on bird of prey feeding ecology.

Working for the University of Aberdeen, Clarke focused on hen harrier feeding in Orkney. He also contributed to the controversial Joint Raptor Study Langholm Project, studying the predation of red grouse by hen harriers and peregrine falcons in southwest Scotland's border country.

Clarke's reputation took him to India to study the world's largest harrier roosts for the Bombay Natural History Society. He subsequently worked on a project that successfully reintroduced red kites to several English regions.

Clarke's first book, Harriers of the British Isles, appeared in 1990. It was followed by The Marsh Harrier (1995) and Montagu's Harrier (1996). He was co-editor of Biology and Conservation of Small Falcons in 1993 and during the final months before his early death he worked on the second edition of The Hen Harrier, adding to the first edition written by Watson.

Clarke was treasurer of the British Ornithologists' Union (2000–06). He also looked after the accounts of the Society of Wildlife Artists (SWLA), whose president, Bruce Pearson, was among his friends. His collection of more than 200 works of wildlife art formed part of an SWLA exhibition staged at the Mall Galleries, London, in 2007.

== Personal life ==
Clarke was married to Janis and had a son and daughter.

Clarke died on 28 January 2007 at the age of 54. He had spent the weekend before his death in the Fens with hen and marsh harriers.
