= Don Clark (psychologist) =

- Born: Donald H. Clark; 1930 (age 95–96); New Jersey, United States
- Education: Antioch College (B.A.); Adelphi University (PhD)
- Known for: Work with gay people Author of Loving Someone Gay
- Scientific career
- Fields: Clinical psychology
- Workplaces: U.S. Army Medical Corps; Hunter College; City University of New York; Saybrook Institute; California Board of Psychology
- Website: www.donclarkphd.com

Donald H. Clark (born 1930 in New Jersey) is an American writer, teacher, consultant and clinical psychologist who has specialized in group and individual work with gay people since 1968. His writing includes fiction, textbooks, and articles for professional journals and popular magazines. He is the author of the best-selling book, Loving Someone Gay, now in its fifth edition, as well as its Spanish-language edition Amar a Alguien Gay, Someone Gay: Memoirs, Living Gay and As We Are.

== Career ==
Clark received a B.A. in psychology from Antioch College in 1953 and a PhD in psychology from Adelphi University in 1959. He also served in the U.S. Army Medical Corps, Scientific and Professional Personnel. He served on the faculty of Hunter College and the City University of New York. He published a report for the Carnegie Corporation of New York about the Human Potential Movement.

He has been a member of the Governing Boards of the Saybrook Institute and the Gay Rights Advocates, a Fellow of the American Psychological Association, and a California Board of Psychology Commissioner, among other roles.

From 1971 to his retirement in 2007, he held a private practice in San Francisco, California.
