= Campbell Clarke =

British journalist and author

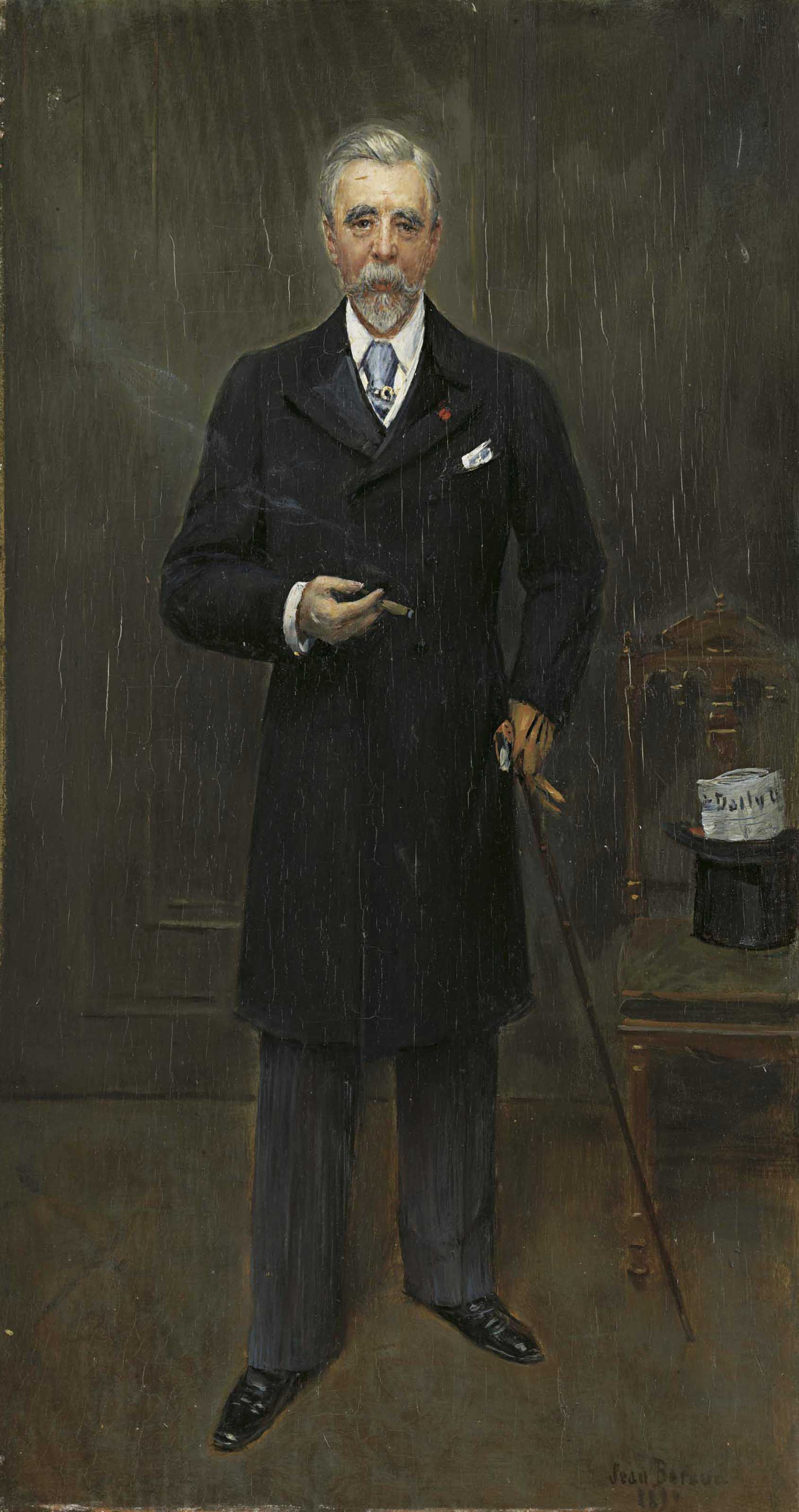
Campbell Clarke, by Jean Béraud, 1889

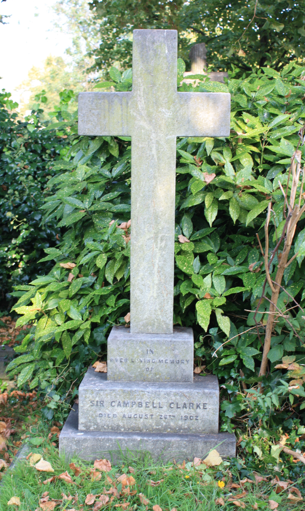
The grave of Sir Campbell Clarke, Brompton Cemetery

Sir Campbell Clarke (3 October 1845 – 26 August 1902) was a British journalist and author.

== Career ==
Clarke was born in 1835, and educated at the University of Bonn. He was a librarian at the British Museum from 1852 until 1870, when he became a journalist. He travelled two years as a special correspondent in France, Germany, Turkey, Greece, and Italy, and settled in Paris in 1872 as the resident correspondent of The Daily Telegraph. In 1876 he went on a special mission to Constantinople to cover the international Conference between the great powers, and he was the first to report on the British occupation of Cyprus.

As an author, he translated papers for the Philological Society, adapted several plays for the English stage, and wrote songs which were set to music. According to his obituary in The Daily Telegraph:

His work was always thorough, scholarly and sympathetic, while he had a wide knowledge of French literature in all its branches. He was much appreciated as a critic in the literary circles of Paris. His knowledge of art was very considerable, and he always wrote about it with insight and feeling... His relations with successive French Ministries were of a confidential and intimate character. He was widely known in Paris society, and very popular in all its various coteries.

He was a Lieutenant of the City of London from 1874, and served as member of the Jury at the two Paris Exhibitions of 1878 and 1889.

Clarke was honoured by several countries. He was knighted in 1897, and was an Officer of the French Legion of Honour, a Grand Officer of the Order of the Medjidieh, a Commander of the Persian Order of the Lion and the Sun, a Commander of the Greek Order of the Redeemer, and a Chevalier of the Spanish Order of Charles III.

Clarke died at Oldlands, near Uckfield, on 26 August 1902. He is buried beneath a simple stone cross in Brompton Cemetery.

== Family ==
Clarke married, in 1870, Annie Levy, fifth daughter of J. M. Levy, JP.
