= Ian Clarke =

Ian Clarke may refer to:

- Ian Clarke (computer scientist) (born 1977), Irish computer programmer, the original designer and lead developer of Freenet
- Ian Clarke (physician) (born 1952), Irish-born physician, missionary, philanthropist, businessman, resident of Uganda
- Ian Clarke (flautist) (born 1964), British classical flute player and composer
- Ian Clarke (gymnast) (born 1946), Australian Olympic gymnast
- Ian Clarke (drummer) (born 1946), drummer with the group Uriah Heep from 1970 to 1971 and Cressida
- Ian Clarke (rugby union) (1931–1997), New Zealand rugby player, farmer and rugby administrator
- Ian Clarke (soccer) (born 1975), Canadian soccer player
- I. F. Clarke (1918–2009), known as Ian, British bibliographer and literary scholar

== See also ==
- Ian Clark (disambiguation)
