= Philip Doddridge =

English Congregationalist leader, educator, and hymnwriter (1702–1751)

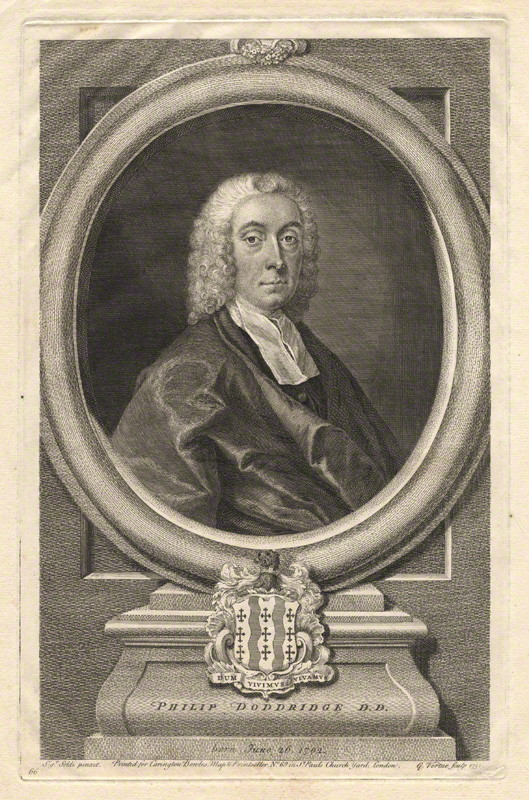
- Born: 26 June 1702; London
- Died: 26 October 1751; Lisbon
- Occupations: Writer, university teacher, cleric, preacher, parson

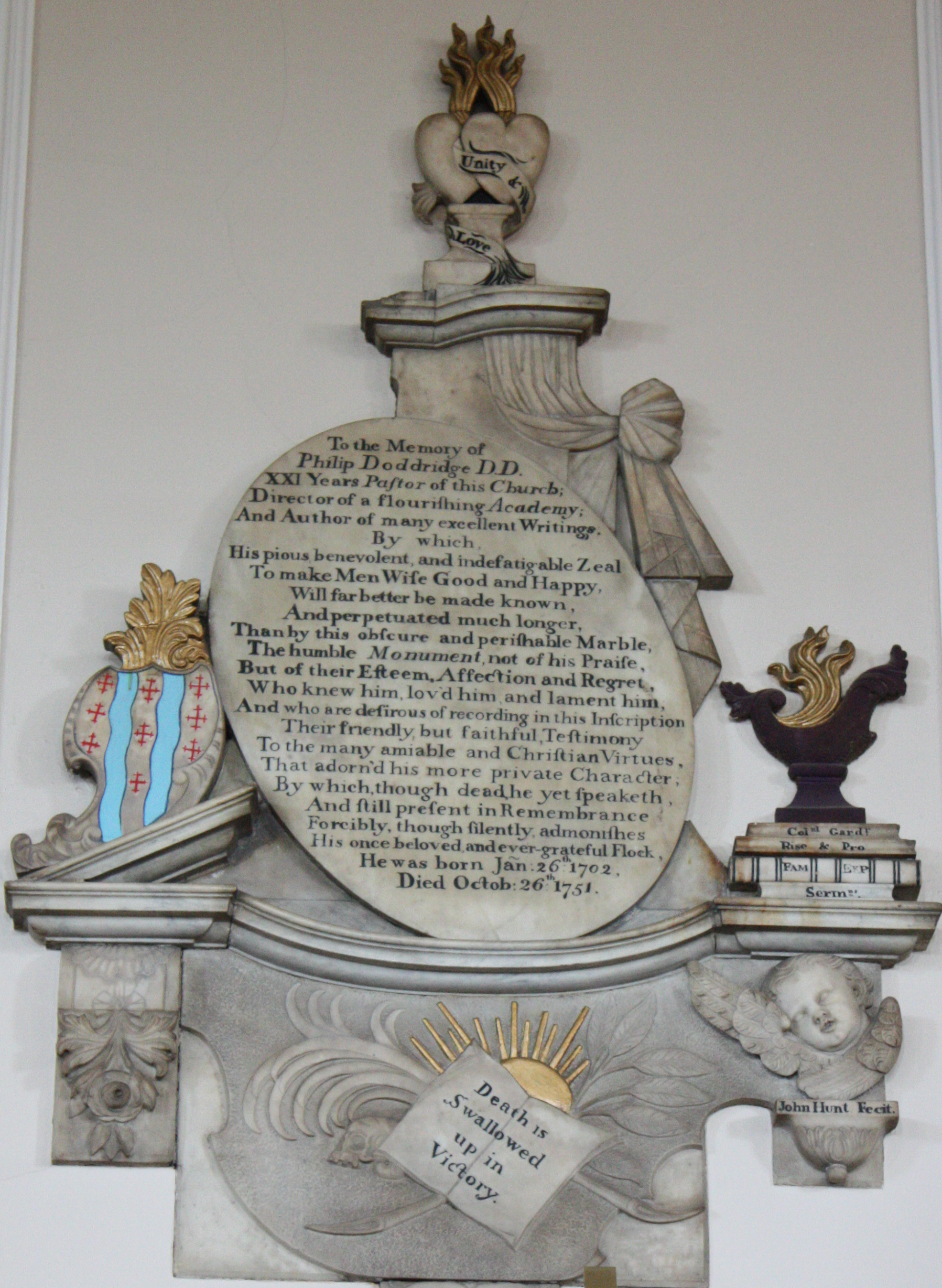
Memorial in Doddridge Chapel, now the United Reformed Church, Doddridge Street, Northampton

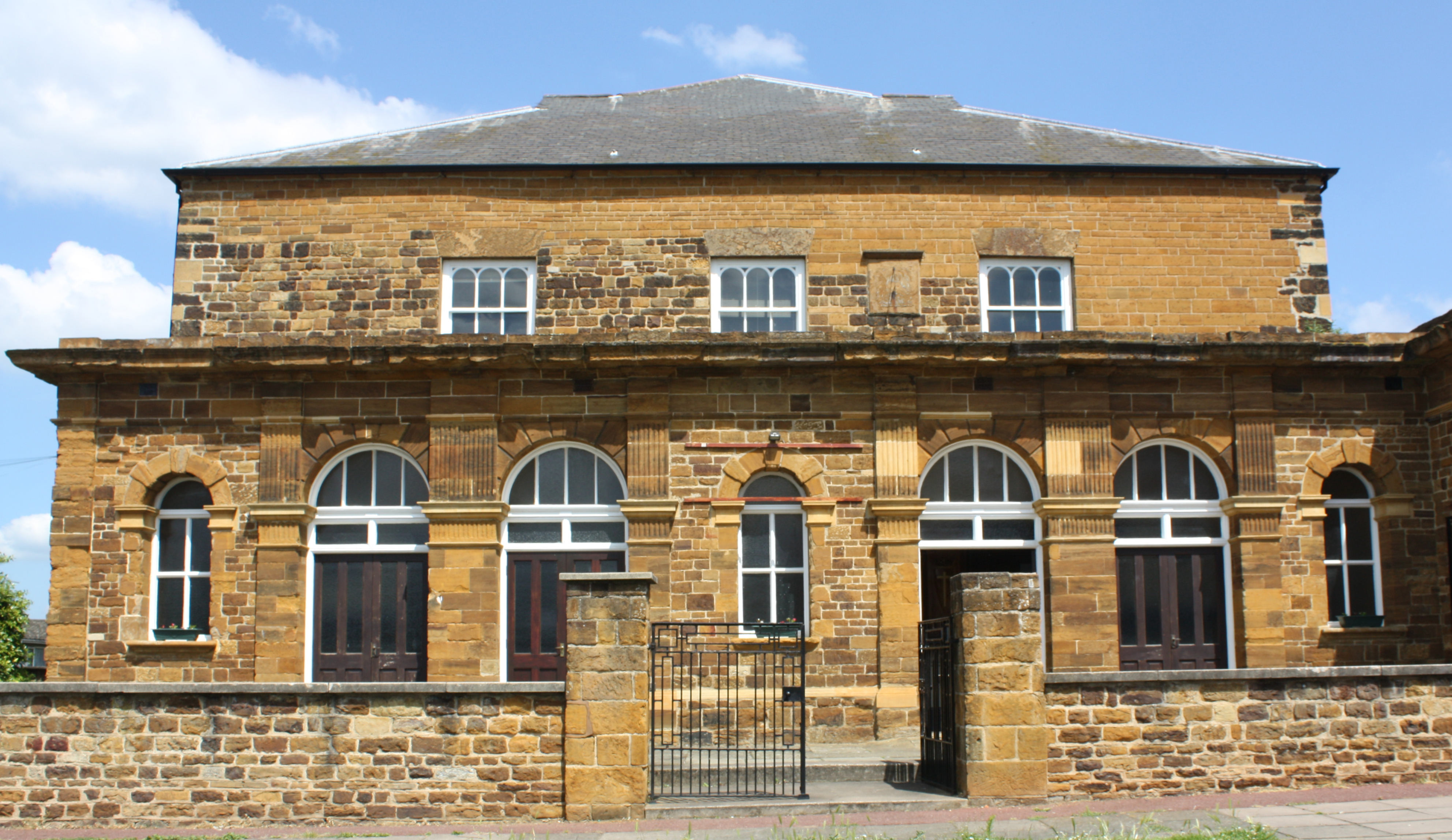
United Reformed Church, Doddridge Street, Northampton, where Doddridge was minister

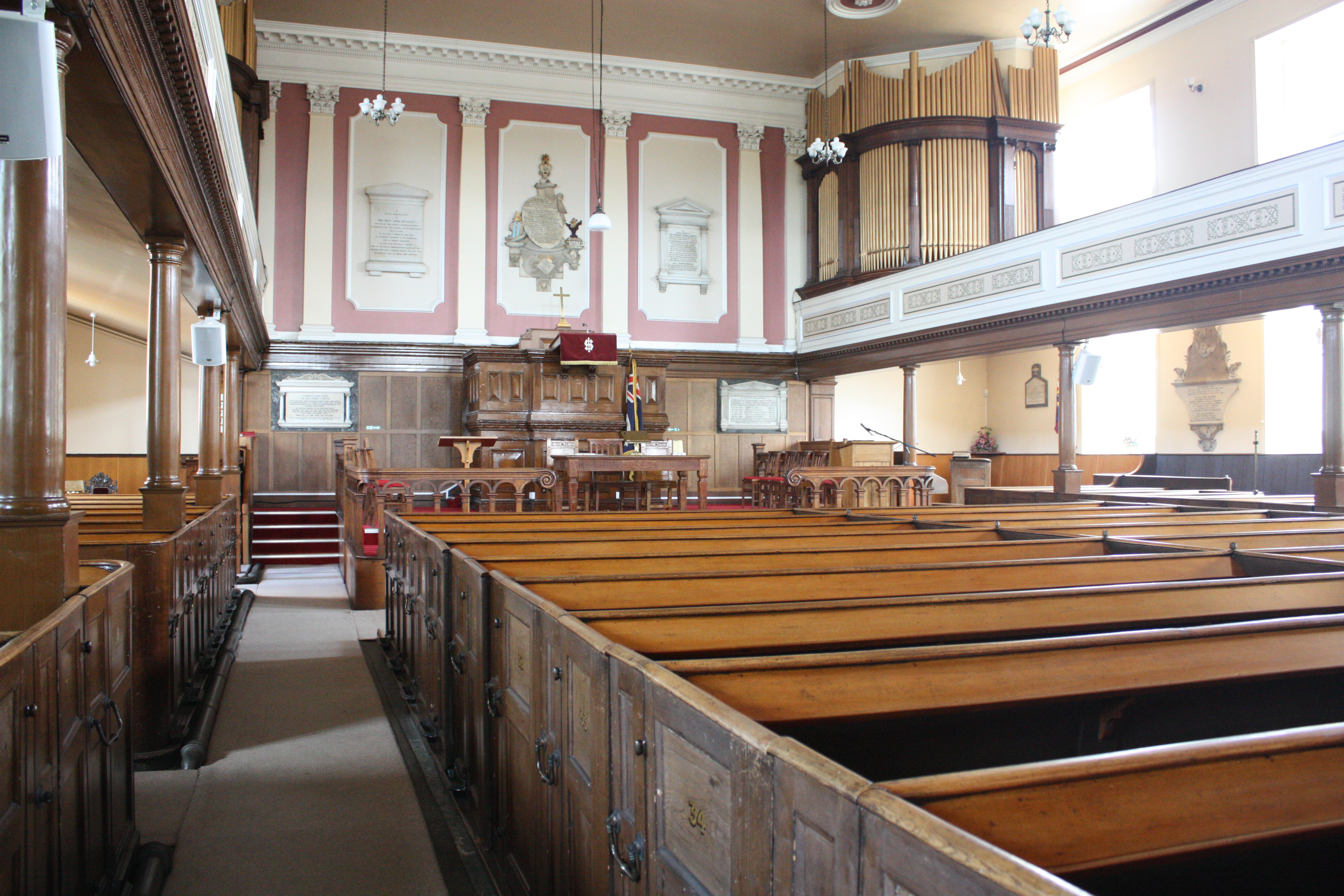
Interior of the Chapel, showing box pews and galleries

Philip Doddridge D.D. (26 June 1702 – 26 October 1751) was an English Nonconformist (specifically, Congregationalist) minister, educator, and hymnwriter.

== Early life ==
Philip Doddridge was born in London, the last of the twenty children of Daniel Doddridge (d 1715), a dealer in oils and pickles. His father was a son of John Doddridge (1621–1689), rector of Shepperton, Middlesex, who was ejected from his living following the Act of Uniformity of 1662 and became a Nonconformist minister, and a great-nephew of the judge and MP Sir John Doddridge (1555–1628). Philip's mother, Elizabeth, considered to have been the greater influence on him, was the orphan daughter of the Rev John Bauman (d. 1675), a Lutheran clergyman who had fled from Prague to escape religious persecution, during the unsettled period following the flight of the Elector Palatine. In England, the Rev John Bauman (sometimes written Bowerman) was appointed master of the grammar school at Kingston upon Thames.

Before Philip could read, his mother began to teach him the history of the Old and New Testament from blue Dutch chimney-tiles on the chimney place of their sitting room. In his youth, Philip Doddridge was educated first by a tutor employed by his parent then boarded at a private school in London. In 1712, he then attended the grammar school at Kingston-upon-Thames, where his maternal grandfather had been master. The school's master when Doddridge attended, was Rev Daniel Mayo (1672-1733), the son of John Bauman's friend Richard Mayo, ejected vicar of Kingston-upon-Thames.

His mother died on 12 April 1711, when he was eight years old. His father died on 17 July 1715. He then had a guardian named Downes who moved him to another private school at St Albans, where he was much influenced by the Presbyterian minister Samuel Clarke of St Albans. Downes squandered Doddridge's inheritance, leaving the orphaned 13-year-old Philip Doddridge destitute in St Albans. Here, Clarke took him on, treating him as a son, guiding his education and encouraging his call to the ministry; they remained lifelong friends. Doddridge preached at the funeral of his older friend in 1750, remarking: "To him under God I owe even myself and all my opportunities of public usefulness in the church."

== Marriage ==
On 22 December 1730 he married Mercy Maris after a seven-month courtship (1709–1790), daughter of Richard Maris, a baker and maltster of Worcester, and his second wife, Elizabeth Brindley. The marriage was at Upton-upon-Severn where Mercy's family lived. They had nine children. The first, Elizabeth or Tetsey (1731–1736), died just before her fifth birthday and was buried under the platform of the Doddridge Chapel, Northampton. Four children survived to adulthood. The correspondence between them provides an insight into their lives.

== Contribution to education and religious life ==
With independent religious leanings, Doddridge declined offers which would have led him into the Anglican ministry or a career in law; and in 1719, with Clarke's support, chose instead to enter the Dissenting academy at Kibworth in Leicestershire. Here Doddridge was taught by John Jennings, whom he briefly succeeded in 1723. Later that year, at a general meeting of Nonconformist ministers, Doddridge was chosen to conduct the academy being newly established a few miles away at Market Harborough. It moved many times, and was known as Northampton Academy. After his death in 1751, the academy continued; it is probably best known as Daventry Academy.

In 1729 he received an invitation to be pastor to an independent congregation at Northampton, which he also accepted. Here his popularity as a preacher is said to have been chiefly due to his "high susceptibility, joined with physical advantages and perfect sincerity". His sermons were mostly practical in character, and his aim was to cultivate in his hearers a spiritual and devotional frame of mind.

Throughout the 1730s and 1740s Doddridge continued his academic and pastoral work, and developed close relations with numerous early religious revivalists and independents, through extensive visits and correspondence. Through this approach he helped establish and maintain a circle of influential independent religious thinkers and writers, including Isaac Watts. He also became a prolific author and hymnwriter. In 1736 both the universities at Aberdeen gave him the degree of Doctor of Divinity. However, these multifarious labours led to so many engagements and bulky correspondence as to interfere seriously both with his preaching and academic duties (he had some 200 students to whom he lectured on philosophy and theology, in the mathematical or Spinozistic style).

His The Rise and Progress of Religion in the Soul was translated into seven languages. Charles Spurgeon referred to The Rise and Progress as "that holy book". Besides a New Testament commentary and other theological works, Doddridge also wrote over 400 hymns. Most of the hymns were written as summaries of his sermons and were to help the congregation express their response to the truths they were being taught.

== Hymns ==
Doddridge was known for ending his sermons with newly crafted hymns as summaries of the lessons, but his hymns were not published during his lifetime. The first posthumous edition contained 370 hymns. Many of Doddridge's hymns, such as "O God of Bethel, by whose hand", continue to be used to this day across the English-speaking world. "O God of Bethel" appears as № 497 in The Hymnal 1940, and № 709 in The Hymnal 1982 of the Episcopal Church, and as № 269 in the Presbyterian Hymnal (1990). "How Gentle God's Commands" appears as № 69 in the Methodist Hymnal (1939), № 53 in the Methodist Hymnal (1966), and as № 681 in the Trinity Hymnal (1990). The Advent section of Evangelical Lutheran Worship begins with № 239 "Hark the Glad Sound!" The Sacred Harp includes ten of his hymn texts, the most popular being "The Last Words of Copernicus" on page 112.

== Doddridge's Youth's Scheme ==
Concerned at the small number of students attending the Dissenting academies, in 1750 Doddridge initiated a Youth's Scheme, to provide capable boys from poor families with a grammar school education that would enable them to undertake further study at a Dissenting academy. Doddridge used this subscription-funded Youth's Scheme to attach a preparatory school to Northampton Academy, initially with six students.

Samuel Smith had been recommended and was supported by Doddridge's friend Robert Cruttenden. Doddridge now had thirty 'pupils' in his Academy, and six 'students' in his school. Initially, the senior students at the Academy were responsible for teaching the students, but had he lived, it was his intention to employ a third tutor, alongside himself and Samuel Clark. The Youth's Scheme did not survive Doddridge's death.

== Death and legacy ==
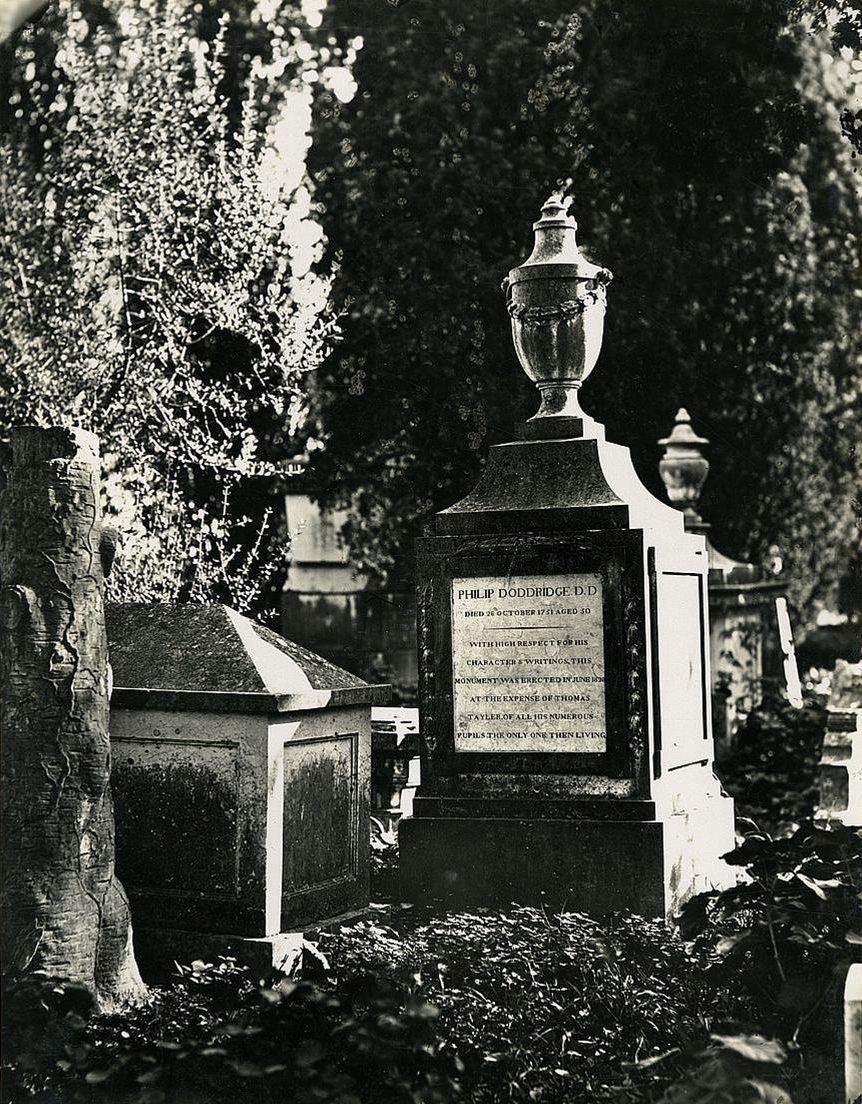
Tomb of Doddridge in the British Cemetery by St George's Church, Lisbon

In 1751, Doddridge's health, which had never been good, broke down. He sailed for Lisbon on 30 September of that year; the change was unavailing, and he died there of tuberculosis. He was buried in the British Cemetery, Lisbon, where his grave may be seen. A second tombstone was added to his grave in 1828.

Doddridge worked towards a united Nonconformist body that would have wide appeal, retaining highly cultured elements without alienating those less educated. His best known work, The Rise and Progress of Religion in the Soul (1745), dedicated to Isaac Watts, was often reprinted and became widely influential. It was through reading it, together with Isaac Milner, that William Wilberforce began the spiritual journey which eventually led to his conversion. It is said that this work best illustrates Doddridge's religious genius, and it has been widely translated. His other well-known works include: The Family Expositor (6 vols., 1739–1756); Life of Colonel Gardiner (1747); and a Course of Lectures on Pneumatology, Ethics and Divinity (1763). Doddridge also published several courses of sermons on particular topics.

John Wesley stated, in the Preface to his Notes on the New Testament, that he was indebted to "the Family Expositor of the late pious and learned Dr. Doddridge" for some "useful observations".

Doddridge's academy evolved into New College, Hampstead, later known as New College London, a centre for training Congregational and then United Reformed Church ministers. (This college is not connected with Royal Holloway, University of London, also a constituent college of the University of London and briefly known as Royal Holloway and Bedford New College when those two colleges merged in the 1970s.) The library of the college, which held a large collection of his manuscripts, was transferred to Dr Williams's Library in 1976.

== Doddridge United Reformed Church ==
The Doddridge United Reformed Church (formerly the Castle Hill URC) in Doddridge Street, Northampton, was formerly Congregational, Doddridge and Commercial Street URC. It was the scene of the ministry of Doddridge from 1729 to 1751. The church was founded in 1662, built in 1695 and enlarged in 1842. It united with Commercial Street church in 1959 and became a United Reformed Church in 1972. The interior has galleries and box pews and a memorial to Doddridge. The building was Grade II listed by English Heritage in 1952.

== Works ==
- The Rise and Progress of Religion in the Soul (1745)
- The Family Expositor (6 vols., 1739–1756)
- Life of Colonel Gardiner (1747)
- Course of Lectures on Pneumatology, Ethics and Divinity (1763)
- Practical Discourses on Regeneration
- Ten sermons on the power, & grace of Christ, and on the evidences of His glorious gospel
- A Dissertation on the Inspiration of the New Testament

== Hymn List ==
- Awake, my soul, stretch every nerve [published posthumously]
- Hark the glad sound! the Saviour comes [based on Luke 4:18-19]
- O God of Bethel, by whose hand

== See also ==
- Congregational church
- English Dissenter
- Independent (religion)
- Parable of the Faithful Servant
