= Malcolm Clarke =

Malcolm Clarke may refer to:

- Malcolm Clarke (zoologist) (1930–2013), British marine biologist
- Malcolm Clarke (composer) (1943–2003), British composer
- Malcolm Clarke (footballer) (1944–2004), Scottish footballer
- Malcolm Clarke (filmmaker), English film maker
- Malcolm Clarke (Neighbours), fictional character on the Australian soap opera Neighbours

== See also ==
- Malcolm Clark (disambiguation)
