= Matthew Clarke (physician) =

English physician

- Born: 1701; London, England
- Died: November 1778 (aged 76–77)
- Occupation: Physician

Matthew Clarke (1701 – November 1778) was an English physician.

== Biography ==
Matthew Clarke was the only son of Dr. Matthew Clarke and his wife Anne Frith. Matthew was born in London in 1701, and became a medical student at Leyden in 1721. His inaugural dissertation for M.D. at Leyden, on pleurisy, was read in 1726. He was admitted M.D. at Cambridge in 1728, and fellow of the London College of Physicians in 1736, and was censor in 1743. He was elected physician to Guy's Hospital in 1732, and resigned that office in 1754. Soon retiring from practice, he resided at Tottenham till his death in November 1778.
