= Unspoken (play) =

Unspoken is a one-woman play written by Rebecca Clarke. It was first performed in 2005 and has been toured around Australia since. The show is also performed by Rebecca Clarke. The play tells the author's semi-autobiographical story about what it is like to have a brother with severe disabilities. Unspoken is the winner of Best Independent Production and Best Newcomer at the 2005 Sydney Theatre Awards.
