= Rebecca Clarke =

Rebecca Clarke or Rebecca Clark may refer to:

- Rebecca Clarke (composer) (1886–1979), English classical composer and violist
- Rebecca Sophia Clarke (1833–1906), American author of children's fiction
- Rebecca Parker Clarke (1790–1865), American abolitionist and faith leader
- Rebecca Clarke, an actress in Pompeii: The Last Day
- Rebecca Clarke, Australian playwright and performer of one-woman play Unspoken
- Rebecca Faye Clark (known as Rebecca Pow, born 1960), British member of parliament
