= Sarah Clarke (journalist) =

Irish journalist

Sarah Clarke (née Dobson, born in Coleraine) is a broadcast journalist from Northern Ireland, who works at UTV and U105.

== Broadcasting career ==
She is a newsreader and reporter for U105 News and UTV Live. From 2007 to 2009, Clarke worked as a continuity announcer at the station.

In 2009, Clarke won Broadcast Newcomer of the Year at the CIPR Press and Broadcast Awards.

== Personal life ==
Clarke attended Queen's University, Belfast. She is married with three children
