= Theophilus Clarke =

English painter

Theophilus Clarke ARA (1776? – 1831) was an English painter.

== Biography ==
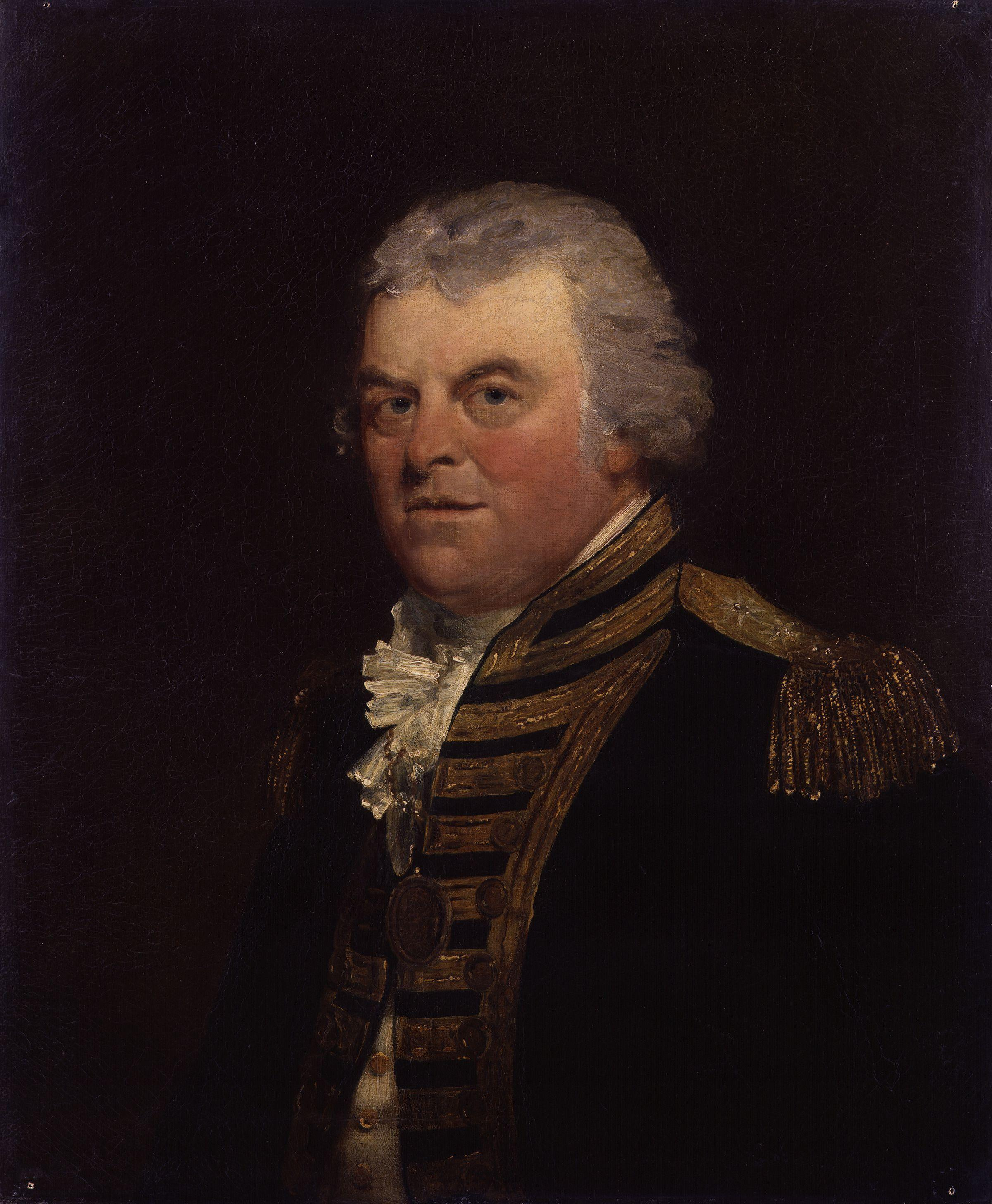
Alan Gardner, 1st Baron Gardner, as pictured by Clarke (1799)

Clarke is stated to have been born in 1776. He was a student at the Royal Academy Schools, and also enjoyed the privilege of being John Opie's pupil. He first exhibited at the Royal Academy itself in 1795, sending Una—from Spenser's Faery Queene and A Shepherd Boy. In 1803 he was elected an associate of the Royal Academy and continued exhibiting until 1810.

The bulk of his work consisted of portraits, among those exhibited being portraits of Charles Kemble, the Countess of Erne, Lieutenant-colonel and Lady Caroline Stuart-Wortley, Lord and Lady Mulgrave, Count Woronzow, and others. He also painted and exhibited landscapes, fishing, domestic, and fancy subjects. Among these were Dorothea—from Don Quixote, exhibited in 1802, and engraved in mezzotint by William Say; The Lovers and The Pensive Girl,' from Thomson's Seasons; Margate, fishing boats going out; and A view of the common fields at Hayes, Middlesex. He also exhibited occasionally at the British Institution. Clarke resided in London and died in early 1831, being buried on 17 April.
