= Ronald Clarke =

Ronald Clarke may refer to:

- Ron Clarke (speedway rider) (1914–1981), former motorcycle speedway world finalist
- Ron Clarke (1937–2015), Australian athlete and mayor of the Gold Coast, Queensland
- Ronald J. Clarke, paleoanthropologist most notable for the discovery of Little Foot
- Ronald V. Clarke (1941–2025), British criminologist, advocate of rational choice theory in criminology

== See also ==
- Ronald Clark (disambiguation)
