= Donald Clarke =

Donald or Don Clarke may refer to:

- Donald Henderson Clarke (1887–1958), American writer and journalist
- Donald Clarke (GC) (1923–1942), British recipient of the George Cross
- Donald Clarke (cricketer) (1926–2008), English cricketer
- Don Clarke (1933–2002), New Zealand rugby union player
- Donald Clarke (writer) (born 1940), American writer on music
- Don R. Clarke (born 1945), general authority of the Church of Jesus Christ of Latter-day Saints
- Don Clarke (songwriter) (born 1955), South African songwriter
- Donald C. Clarke, American expert on Chinese law

== See also ==
- Don Clark (disambiguation)
