= Samuel Clark (minister) =

English nonconformist minister

Samuel Clark (1727–1769) was an English nonconformist minister at the Old Meeting, Birmingham.

== Early life ==
Samuel Clark was born in St Albans, the son of Dr Samuel Clarke. He attended Northampton Academy, under Dr Doddridge, staying on as assistant tutor. When, in 1750, Dr Doddridge left England, he left the young Clark in charge of both his Castle Hill congregation and his academy. On Doddridge's death, the trustees placed Caleb Ashworth, minister of a Presbyterian congregation in Daventry, in charge of the academy, which Ashworth transferred to Daventry.

== Tutor at Daventry Academy ==
Although Dr Doddridge's congregation ‘highly respected Mr Clark, and thought themselves greatly obliged to him for his services during their pastor’s absence, he was not sufficiently popular and Calvinistical fully to satisfy the generality of them, so as to be chosen assistant to the Doctor’s successor in the ministerial part of his office.’ As a consequence, Clark moved to Daventry and continued as assistant tutor at the new academy, where he preached once a month. Joseph Priestley was one of the college's first students, and Clark is remembered for his comments on the freshman:

Priestley seems to be a good, sensible fellow, though he has unfortunately got a bad name, Priestley: those who gave him it I hope were no prophets.

The academy had a good library, and a varied stock of scientific equipment, which included an air pump for producing a vacuum. Clark gave lectures in Anatomy, and supervised dissection classes, a rat, cat, and a dog being dissected by Joseph Priestley and his class. Clark's Saturday morning lectures were a little more general, with topics such as 'the doctrine of the brain'. He also gave tutorials, 'took tea' Priestley calls it, with Priestley's class. Here, topics ranged from the methods for composing sermons, the writings of Jonathan Swift, heraldry, and the writings of Lord Bolingbroke, who had sought the repeal of the Act of Settlement 1701, and had published in 1752 an influential series of letters on the study of history. Contentious theology was not neglected, and Clark attended the students’ debating society, where topics included the issues of original sin, predestination, the sleep of the soul and liberty versus necessity. Both tutors were young and ready to indulge their students in the greatest freedom of thought, 'so that our lectures had often the air of friendly conversations on the subject to which they related,' Clark's views being somewhat less orthodox.

== Minister at Birmingham ==
In summer 1757, Clark quit Daventry, to accept a co-pastorship at Old Meeting Birmingham. At that time, the ministers of the Old Meeting also served the Presbyterian congregation at Oldbury. On 3 December 1769, whilst setting out for Oldbury, Clark was thrown from his horse in New Street, Birmingham; he died three days later.
