= Jeremy Clarke =

Jeremy Clarke may refer to:

- Jeremy Clarke (governor) (1605–1652), colonial settler and President of the Colony of Rhode Island and Providence Plantations
- Jeremy Clarke (writer) (1957–2023), British columnist for The Spectator
- Jeremy Clarke (poet) (born 1962), British poet
- Jeremy Clarke (racing driver) (born 1986), American racing driver
- Jeremy Clarke (historian), Australian historian of the Jesuit presence in China

== See also ==
- Jeremy Clark (born 1983), American football defensive end
- Jeremy Clark (defensive back) (born 1994), American football defensive back
