= Ralph Clarke (mayor) =

Ralph Clark (died 1660) was an English tanner, notable for being the first Mayor of Chesterfield.

Clark came from the prominent Clark family of Chesterfield and was elected to the post of Mayor on 21 April, 1598 following the Elizabethan charter issued that same year, which granted the town the right to elect a mayor.

In 1641 when Poll tax was paid, Ralph paid the highest amount in the town.

At the time of his death in 1660, he was living in Cutthorpe, outside of Chesterfield.
