= Samuel Clarke (minister) =

English writer and clergyman (1599–1683)

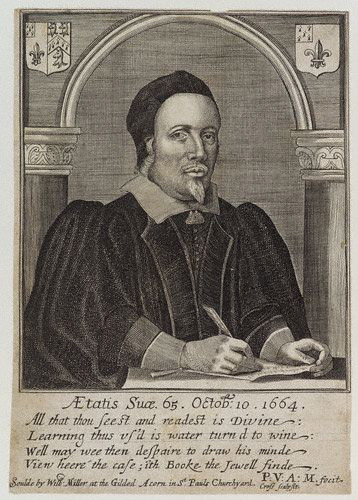
Samuel Clarke, 1650 engraving attributed to Thomas Cross.

Samuel Clarke (10 October 1599 – 25 December 1683) was an English Nonconformist clergyman and significant Puritan biographer.

== Life ==
He was born 10 October 1599 at Wolston, Warwickshire, the son of Hugh Clarke (d. 1634), who was vicar of Wolston for forty years. Clarke was educated by his father till he was thirteen; then at the free school in Coventry; and when seventeen was entered at Emmanuel College, Cambridge. He was ordained about 1622, and held charges at Knowle in Warwickshire, Thornton-le-Moors in Cheshire, and Shotwick on the estuary of the Dee. Here, 2 February 1626, he married Katherine, daughter of Valentine Overton, rector of Bedworth, Warwickshire.

Clarke had already given some offence by his puritan tendencies. He accepted a lectureship at Coventry, where he was opposed by Samuel Buggs, who held both the city churches. Buggs persuaded Bishop Thomas Morton to inhibit Clarke from preaching, and, though Archbishop George Abbot had given him a license, Clarke had to leave Coventry. He was protected by Robert Greville, 2nd Baron Brooke, and finally accepted another lectureship in Warwick, where complaints were still made of his omission of ceremonies. On 23 April 1633 he was inducted to the rectory of Alcester, presented to him by Lord Brook. Clarke make himself conspicuous by attacking James I's Book of Sports, set forth afresh by authority in 1634.

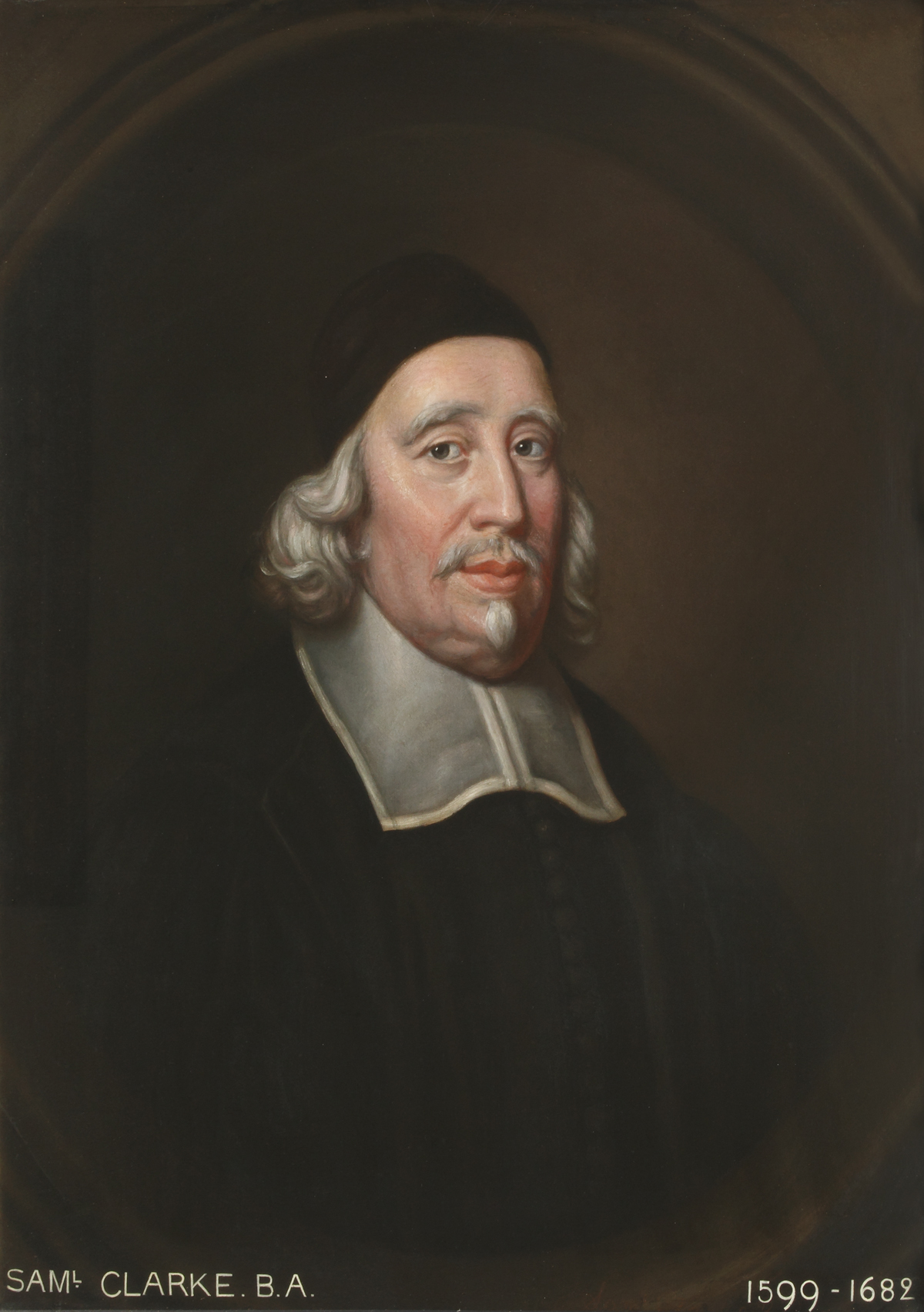

In 1640 he was deputed with Arthur Salwey to visit Charles I at York in order to complain of the et cetera oath. The king made some difficulty in seeing them, but promised that they should not be molested till their petition could come before parliament. On 23 October 1642 Richard Baxter was preaching for Clarke at Alcester, when the guns of the battle of Edgehill were heard, and next day they rode over the battle-field.

Clarke going to London soon afterwards was pressed to the curacy of St. Bennet Fink, in the gift of the chapter of Windsor. The former curate having been expelled, Clarke was elected in his place by the parishioners, and when the war was over resigned Alcester, which was troubled by 'sectaries,' in order to retain it. He occupied himself in writing books, dated from his study in Threadneedle Street. He was well known among the London clergy; was a governor and twice president of Sion College; and served on the committee of ordainers for London in 1643. He was one of the fifty-seven ministers who, 20 January 1649, signed a protest against taking away the king's life. He assisted in drawing up the jus divinum ministerii evangelici, issued by the London Provincial Assembly in 1653, in defence of the regular ministry against the lay-preaching permitted by the independents. In 1654 he was an assistant to the parliamentary commission for the expulsion of scandalous ministers and schoolmasters in the city of London.

At the Restoration Clarke was deputed by the London ministers to congratulate the king; and he took part with Baxter and others in the Savoy Conference. He was ejected in 1662, with two of his sons and four other members of his family. In 1665, with a few other Nonconformists, he took the oath against resistance imposed by the Five Mile Act. Judge John Kelynge, before whom he appeared, congratulated the swearers upon their renunciation of the solemn league and covenant. Clarke disavowed this interpretation, and to put his motives beyond suspicion retired to Hammersmith 24 April 1666. Before his ejection he married his friend Baxter to Margaret Charlton (10 September 1662). Clarke continued to communicate at his parish church. He moved to Isleworth, and spent his time in compiling popular books, chiefly on biography.

== Family ==
His wife Katherine died 21 June 1675, aged 73, and he wrote her life. He died at Isleworth 25 December 1683.

The preacher and writer Samuel Clarke (1626-1701) was his son.

== Biographies ==
He takes as an appropriate name for a biographer the anagram 'Su[c]k-all-Cream' (Marrow, &c., 1675). Clarke's biographical works are:

- A Mirrour or Looking-glass both for Saints and Sinners, held forth in some thousands of examples, 1646. The fourth edition (1671) includes a Geographical description of all the countries in the known world, first issued separately in 1657. An account of the English plantations in America (1670) is often bound up with it.
- The Marrow of Ecclesiastical History . . . Lives of 148 Fathers, Schoolmen, modern Divines, &c., 1649-1650; second enlarged edition in 1654, with portrait of the author by Cross, introduction and complimentary verses by Calamy, Wall, &c. To the third edition in 1675 (with portrait by John Dunstall) are added lives of Christian kings, emperors, etc., of "inferiour Christians, and of many who . . . obtained the surname of Great". Some of these had been separately issued.
- General Martyrologie, 1651, with portrait by Cross (complains that thirty-nine lives from the 'Marrow' have been reprinted in the Abel Redivivus).
- English Martyrologie, 1652.
- The Lives of Twenty-two English Divines, 1662.
- Lives of Ten eminent Divines (with some others), 1662 (portrait by Cross).
- Lives of Thirty-two English Divines, 3rd edition, 1670.
- Lives of sundry Eminent Persons in the later age (with the author's life by himself, and preface by Richard Baxter), 1683.

== Other works ==
Clarke also published England's Remembrancer, a true and full Narrative of Deliverances from the Spanish Invasion, and the powder plot, 1657 (many later editions). Miscellaneous works, besides separate sermons, are:

- The Saints' Nosegay. or a Poesie of 741 Spiritual Flowers, 1642 (privately reprinted, with a memoir, by the author's descendant, G. T. C., in 1881).
- Medulla Theologiae, cases of conscience, in 1659.
- Golden Apples . . . counsel from the Sanctuary to the Rulers of the Earth against tolerating heresy, 1659.
- A Discourse against Toleration, 1660.
- Duty of every one intending to be saved, 1669 (privately reprinted by G. T. C. in 1882).
- The Soul's Conflict (with an account of author's life prefixed), 1678.
- Precedents for Princes, 1680.
- A warning-piece to all drunkards and health drinkers, 1681.
- Book of Apothegms, 1681.
