= Matthew Clerk =

Irish Presbyterian minister

Matthew Clerk (1659 – 25 January 1735), was an Irish Presbyterian minister.

== Life ==
Clerk attended Glasgow University.

He was in Derry during the siege in 1689 and received a bullet wound on his temple, leaving a sore over which he wore a black patch to the end of his days.

=== Work in Ireland ===
It was not until after the siege that he began his studies for the ministry. He was ordained in 1697 by the Route presbytery as minister of Kilrea and Boveedy, County Londonderry. In 1721 he was the sole dissent to the synod's 'charitable declaration' enjoining forbearance towards the nonsubscribers to the Westminster Confession. The following year he and two others entered a strong protest against any compromise with the non-subscribing party. This party attacked him in his own presbytery, but though the matter was referred to the synod, the nonsubscribers were too much occupied in defending themselves to proceed with it.

Clerk's literary contributions to the controversy were the first on either side which appeared with the author's name. His friends considered his manner of writing not sufficiently grave in tone. 'I don't think,' writes Livingstone of Templepatrick to Robert Wodrow, on 23 June 1723, 'his reasoning faculty is despisable, but I wish it were equal to his diverting one, for I think he is one of the most comical old fellows that ever was.'

=== Work in New Hampshire ===
On 29 April 1729 Clerk resigned his charge and emigrated to New Hampshire. On landing he found that James Macgregor, formerly minister of Aghadowey, and founder of the township of Londonderry on the Merrimack River, had died on 5 March. He succeeded him as minister, and also engaged in educational work.

Clerk was a strict vegetarian. Among the quaint anecdotes told of him is one of his criticising to this effect the prowess of St. Peter: 'He only cut off a chiel's lug, and he ought to ha' split doun his held.' Clerk died on 25 January 1735. He was carried to his grave by old comrades at the Derry siege.

== Family ==
He married three times, his third wife being the widow of his friend James Macgregor.

== Works ==
He published :

- 'A Letter from the Country to a Friend in Belfast, with respect to the Belfast Society,' &c. (Belfast), 1712 (misprint for 1722), 18mo (issued in June 1722).
- 'A Letter from the Belfast Society to the Rev. Mr. Matthew Clerk, with an Answer to the Society's Remarks on ... A Letter from the Country,' &c. (Belfast), 1723, 12mo (the Belfast Society's Letter, signed by six of its members [see Bruce, Michael, 1686-1735], was sent to Clerk in October 1722).
