= Naomi Clarke =

New Zealand footballer

Personal information
- Full name: Naomi Clarke
- Date of birth: 8 February 1982 (age 44)

International career
Years	Team	Apps	(Gls)
2004	New Zealand	3	(0)

Naomi Clarke (born 8 February 1982) is a former association football player who represented New Zealand at international level.

Clarke made her Football Ferns début in a 0–2 loss to Australia on 18 February 2004, and finished her international career with three caps to her credit.

Clarke now coaches women's soccer at Tennessee Wesleyan College in Athens, Tennessee.
