= Alf Clarke =

English footballer and manager

Personal information
- Full name: Alfred Clarke
- Date of birth: 23 August 1926
- Place of birth: Hollinwood, England
- Date of death: 17 July 1971 (aged 44)
- Place of death: Eccles, England
- Position: Centre forward

Senior career*
Years	Team	Apps	(Gls)
1946–1948	Stalybridge Celtic	1	(?)
1948	Crewe Alexandra	22	(12)
1948–1952	Burnley	24	(6)
1952–1954	Oldham Athletic	43	(12)
1954–1956	Halifax Town	71	(22)

Managerial career
- Nelson
- * Club domestic league appearances and goals

Alfred Clarke (23 August 1926 – 17 July 1971) was an English association football player and manager. He played as a centre forward for a number of Football League clubs during the 1940s and 1950s.
