= De Clercq =

De Clercq or de Clercq is a surname of Dutch origin. People with the name include:

- Andrew DeClercq (born 1973), American basketball player
- Bart De Clercq (born 1986), Belgian professional bicycle road racer
- Daniël de Clercq (1854–1931), Dutch socialist and vegetarian activist
- Erik De Clercq (born 1941), Belgian physician and biologist
- Hans De Clercq (born 1969), former Belgian racing cyclist
- Jean De Clercq (1905–1984), Belgian footballer
- Jean-Christophe De Clercq (born 1966), French artist
- Lucas de Clercq (1603–1652), Dutch cloth merchant, subject of painter Frans Hals
- Mario De Clercq (born 1966), Belgian professional bicycle racer
- Mathias De Clercq (born 1981), Belgian politician
- Peter de Clercq (born 1959), Dutch diplomat
- Peter De Clercq (born 1966), Belgian professional bicycle road racer
- René de Clercq (1877–1932), Flemish-Dutch political activist, writer, poet, and composer
- Staf De Clercq (1884–1942), Flemish Nazi collaborator and Flemish nationalist
- Willem de Clercq (1795–1844), Dutch poet and leader of the Protestant Revival in the Netherlands
- Willy De Clercq (1927–2011), Belgian politician and government minister

== See also ==
- Declercq, surname of the same origin
- 2852 Declercq, minor planet
- Klerk
- Leclercq (surname)
- Leclerc (surname)
- Clerc (surname)
- De Clerc (surname)
