= De Clerc =

de Clerc may refer to various surnames.

- de Klerk, Klerk, de Klerck, and Klerck are surnames, including:
  - Frederik Willem de Klerk (1936–2021), former President of South Africa.
- LeClerc, Leclerc, Le Clerc (for North-Americans of French descent only) and le Clerc are typical French or Francophone surnames.
- Leclercq and Le Clercq are surnames.
- Declercq
- De Clercq
- Clerck
- De Clerck
- Clerc, surname
