= Clericus =

Clericus may refer to:

- Jean Leclerc (Le Clerc), also Latin: Johannes Clericus (1657-1736), a Swiss theologian and biblical scholar
- Franciscus Clericus
- Tagiades clericus, a spread-winged skipper butterfly belonging to the family Hesperiidae
- Clericus Cup, a football tournament involving Catholic priests and seminarians

== See also ==
- Clark (disambiguation)
- Clerc
- Clerck
- Clerk
- Le Clerc
- Klerck
- Klerk
- Leclerc (disambiguation)
