= Declercq =

Declercq is a Dutch occupational surname, meaning "the clerk", common in the Belgian province of West Flanders. It is a concatenation of the even more common name De Clercq that is quite specific to East Flanders. People with this name include:

- Andrew DeClercq (born 1973), American basketball player and coach
- Benjamin Declercq (born 1994), Belgian racing cyclist
- Ed DeClercq, American politician
- Gilbert Declercq (born 1946), Belgian painter, illustrator, and comics artist
- Nico F. Declercq (born 1975), Belgian physicist and mechanical engineer.
- Pierre Declercq (1938–1981), French New Caledonian politician, noted supporter of New Caledonian independence
- René Desiderius Declercq (1877–1932), Flemish-Dutch political activist, writer, poet, and composer
- Staf Declercq (1884–1942), Flemish nationalist Nazi collaborator and co-founder of the Vlaamsch Nationaal Verbond
- Tim Declercq (born 1989), Belgian racing cyclist

Declerck

- André Declerck (1919–1967), Belgian racing cyclist
- Richard Declerck (1899–1986), Belgian lawyer and politician

== See also ==
- 2852 Declercq, Main Belt asteroid, named after the maiden name of the Belgian discoverer (Henri Debehogne)'s wife
- De Clercq
- Leclercq (surname)
- Leclerc (surname)
- Clerc (surname)
- De Clerc (surname)
