= De Lustige Kapoentjes =

Belgian comic book series

- De Lustige Kapoentjes in their most famous incarnation, by Marc Sleen. From left to right (clockwise): Lange So, Fonske, Bikini, Oscar, de Champetter and Flurk.
- Author(s): Bob De Moor (1947-1950), Marc Sleen (1950-1965), Hurey, Jean-Pol, Jef Nys, Jo
- Current status/schedule: Terminated.
- Launch date: 1947
- End date: 1989
- Genre(s): Humor comics, Gag-a-day comics, children's comics

De Lustige Kapoentjes (literally: "The Joyful Rascals") was a long-running Flemish comic book series, which existed under different titles and was drawn by different artists, among whom Marc Sleen ("The Lustige Kapoentjes") and Willy Vandersteen ("De Vrolijke Bengels") are the most well known. The series was published in 't Kapoentje, the youth supplement of Het Volk, and in Ons Volkske, the youth supplement of De Standaard. They were the mascots of 't Kapoentje from 1947 until the magazine's demise in 1985.

The weekly gag-a-day comic was very popular in the 1940s, 1950s and early 1960s. In all of its incarnations the concept was the same: a group of children play tricks on adults and frequently get their revenge on a local police officer and an older evil young adult.

On 1 January 2030, all comics series by Marc Sleen, including De Lustige Kapoentjes, will enter public domain, in accordance with the Marc Sleen Foundation.

== Origins ==
In 1933 Flemish comic strip artist Eugeen Hermans, aka "Pink", published the gag-a-day comic Filipke en de Rakkers in Ons Volkske, inspired by similar American comic book series such as Martin Branner's Perry and the Rinkydinks, Rudolph Dirks' The Katzenjammer Kids and Dutch artist Frans Piët's Sjors van de Rebellenclub. In 1940 Ons Volkske had to cease publication due to the Nazi invasion of World War II.

On April 3, 1947, a new magazine was launched called 't Kapoentje, where Willy Vandersteen published a new version of the same concept called "De Vrolijke Bengels" ("The Joyful Rascals"). The characters in this series were:

- Poliet: A smart boy who wears glasses and always makes handy inventions. He speaks in rhyme.
- Vlooike: A smart girl with pig tails.
- Pontius and Pilatus: Two twin boys who are both deaf. As a result, they never understand what is going on and frequently ask one another for more information, with predictable bad results.
- Patatje: An obese boy who was only present in the early episodes. Later he was removed from the series.
- Tieter: A vain, arrogant and stupid police officer. He always thinks he is the best and smartest and seldom understands people are fooling him. When he troubles the children they play a trick back on him. His attitude is comparable to another character by Vandersteen: Lambik.
- Job: A bad young adult who enjoys bullying and tricking other people, especially the children. They frequently help Tieter to arrest or punish him.
- Mie Pladijs: A house wife who bakes cakes. She is frequently a victim of Job's pranks and thefts.

De Vrolijke Bengels quickly became popular among the youth and were translated into French as Les Joyeux Lurons. On November 6, 1947, Vandersteen joined De Standaard, where he continued in the series in their youth supplement Ons Volkske. On March 16, 1950, the children in the series were replaced by Suske en Wiske and Lambik became Tieter's deputy police officer. The original title remained the same. On April 30, 1953, the original children returned and Suske, Wiske and Lambik were removed from the series again. On September 2, 1954, the final gag episode of De Vrolijke Bengels was published.

== De Lustige Kapoentjes ==
=== Bob De Moor's version ===
After Vandersteen left 't Kapoentje lost its most popular feature. Bob De Moor drew a new series that was very similar to De Vrolijke Bengels and was baptized De Lustige Kapoentjes by Marc Sleen, chief editor of 't Kapoentje. The characters were similar to their predecessors, but had different names and appearances:

- Janus, Benjamien, Bertus, Petrus and Eefje: the children.
- Pakker: The police officer
- Dorus: The juvenile delinquent.

=== Marc Sleen's version ===
De Moor worked under a pseudonym, Artec-Studio's, and for the next two years he drew new episodes. In 1949 he left to join Hergé's studio, causing Sleen to continue the series. The title was kept, but the characters were redrawn and received new names:

- Fonske: A young boy, originally called "Mielke", but this was changed to "Fonske".
- Bikini: A young girl with black curly hair, named after the clothing piece of the same name.
- Oscar: A young boy, recognizable by his large cap.
- Lange So: A tall boy with dumbo ears, a beret and who has literally the same height as an adult.
- De Champetter: The obese, vain and stupid police officer. Originally he was named Champetter Vanmeel, but this last name was never referred to again.
- Flurk: The young adult who enjoys bullying, stealing and tricking others. The children always manage to get back at him and have the police officer arrest, punish or humiliate him.
- Moeder Stans: A house wife, frequently victim of Flurk's tricks. In later episodes she resembled Nero's wife from Sleen's other series, The Adventures of Nero.

From 1950 until 1965 Sleen drew a weekly gag episode. His version is still the best known among Belgian comic book fans and fondly remembered for its anarchic and often absurd comedy, as well as the nostalgic peaceful village atmosphere. In 1955 the series was also translated in the French magazine Le Petit Luron.

Sleen sometimes gave the Lustige Kapoentjes cameo's in his main series The Adventures of Nero, namely the albums "De Brollebril" ("The Bogus Glasses") (1960), "De Krabbekokers" (1964), "De Dolle Dina's" (1970), "De Gouden Patatten" (1984), "Joske de Wreker" (1986), "De Gladde Figaro" (1991-1992), "De Adhemar Bonbons" (1989) and "Zilveren Tranen" (2002).

=== Name dispute ===
In 1965 Sleen left Het Volk to join De Standaard and dropped all of his comic strip series except for The Adventures of Nero. A dispute over the rights to the characters was resolved by having the original characters join the magazine Pats, the youth supplement of De Standaard and Het Nieuwsblad, while the title "De Lustige Kapoentjes" remained custody of 't Kapoentje. This led to a confusing situation. Hurey continued Sleen's original Kapoentjes' characters in Pats from 1965 until 1967, but legally could not use the original title on top of the pages. This also prevented album publications. In 1967 Hurey joined Het Volk and his assistant Jean-Pol continued the series until the mid 1970s. Meanwhile, 't Kapoentje continued De Lustige Kapoentjes ' title, but had to change all the characters. Jef Nys continued the series with new characters such as Broske, Tobias, Fonske, Bieke, Loebas the dog, Sussewiet the villain and Fideel the police officer, but after a while he dropped this cast and just used the child characters from his own series Jommeke in gag situations. In 1967, Hurey, who just left Pats, continued the original Lustige Kapoentjes concept, but once again created new characters: Ketje, Oscar, Proske, the older young woman Poes, Jakke the villain and Firmin the police officer. In 1976 Hurey left the comics industry and was succeeded by Karel Boumans. From 1985 until 1989 artist Jo drew the series, being the only version never published in album format. None of Sleen's successors ever managed to duplicate the original success. As a result, the series was terminated in 1989.

== Reboot ==
In 2011 Tom Bouden rebooted De Lustige Kapoentjes, with a different script writer for every new gag. In March 2012 the first new album was published.

== In popular culture ==
Ever Meulen once spoofed De Vrolijke Bengels in a 1971 issue of Humo, where Suske en Wiske, Tintin, Spirou and Job are smoking cannabis in their club house, threatened by Tieter and Lambik who want to arrest them. Decades later Meulen also drew the Champetter on the album cover of the compilation album Bel 80 - Het Beste Uit De Belpop van 1985, a collection of Belgian pop music from 1985.

In 2007-2008 some gags of Cowboy Henk had him steal a cake from Moeder Stans and be chased away by an obese police officer. Earlier, Kamagurka and Hector Leemans, drew a parody of De Lustige Kapoentjes in which Flurk steals an atomic bomb, which later detonates.

Flemish comedian Urbanus was inspired by Sleen's gag-a-day comics like Piet Fluwijn en Bolleke and De Lustige Kapoentjes in his own series Urbanus and Plankgas en Plastronneke. In the Urbanus story Urbanus op Uranus ("Urbanus on Uranus") (1984) the Lustige Kapoentjes want his autograph. Another Urbanus story, Het Lustige Kapoentje (1988), is a direct title homage.
