= Clerical =

Clerical may refer to:

- Pertaining to the clergy
- Pertaining to a clerical worker
- Clerical script, a style of Chinese calligraphy
- Clerical People's Party

== See also ==
- Cleric (disambiguation)
- Clerk (disambiguation)
