= Leclerc =

Leclerc (French pronunciation: [ləklɛʁ]) may refer to:

- Leclerc, nom de guerre of French WWII general Philippe Leclerc de Hauteclocque
- Leclerc tank, a French main battle tank
- Leclerc (surname), a French surname
- E.Leclerc, a French hypermarket chain

== See also ==
- Clerk (disambiguation)
