= Crésus Kana =

Belgian footballer (born 2011)

Personal information
- Full name: Crésus-Owen Kana
- Date of birth: 27 December 2011 (age 14)
- Place of birth: Brussels, Belgium
- Position: Midfielder

Team information
- Current team: Anderlecht

Youth career
- Years: Team
- 2019–: Anderlecht

Crésus-Owen Kana (born 27 December 2011) is a Belgian footballer who currently plays as a midfielder for Anderlecht.

== Early and personal life ==
Kana was born in Brussels, Belgium, to Guéry and Charlotte Kana. His name comes from Croesus, the last king of Lydia (present-day Western Türkiye), after a friend of his mother suggested the name, and his mother chose it for him based on its uniqueness.

Kana is the brother of fellow professional footballers Marco and Joël Kana, both of whom also play for Anderlecht. The trio are of Congo-Kinshasa descent.

== Career ==
Enrolled in the academy of professional club Anderlecht from the age of seven, Kana impressed at youth level, and by the age of ten was finishing as top goal-scorer in local competitions. In 2022 he was subject to an in-house documentary by Anderlecht, MAUVE. Spécial BXL (MAUVE. Brussels special), highlighting five players at the club born in Brussels and their respective footballing careers. He continued to showcase his ability at academy level, and in April 2025, he was named man-of-the-match in Anderlecht under-15's 3–2 defeat to Spanish club Barcelona in the final of the Al-Wahda International Youth Tournament.

In November 2025, he was named player of the tournament at the Algarve Elite Cup. By April 2026 he had already debuted for the club's under-18 side, despite only being fourteen at the time. In May of the same year, he was named in Belgian newspaper Het Nieuwsblad's list of top fifty Belgian football talents, listed at seventeenth despite being the youngest player on the list.

== Style of play ==
Kana is described as a "very technical" attacking midfielder who "likes to keep the ball at his feet, a bit like the old-school number 10s" by his brother Marco, who has also named him as the most talented of the three brothers. At just thirteen, he was considered one of the biggest talents in Anderlecht's academy, and was already captaining the under-16 side.
