= Jommeke =

Belgian comic strip series in publication since 1955

- Jommeke and his parrot Flip
- Author(s): Jef Nys (later continued by Gerd Van Loock (drawings and writing), Hugo de Sterk, Philippe Delzenne (drawings) and Jan Ruysbergh (writing))
- Launch date: 30 October 1955
- Genre(s): Humor comics, Adventure comics, Children's comics

Jommeke is a Belgian comic strip series in publication since 1955. It was created by Jef Nys and can be defined as a humoristic children's adventure series. Jommeke, an 11-year-old boy, is the series' main protagonist. It was originally published in Kerk en Leven, before moving to Het Volk, where it ran until the newspaper ceased to exist in 2010. It is now published in Het Nieuwsblad, De Gentenaar and De Standaard.

Jommeke is popular in Flanders and, together with Suske en Wiske, is the best-selling comic strip in the region. However, its success remained a phenomenon only in Belgium and the Netherlands.

== History ==
The first appearance of Jommeke was on 30 October 1955, as a gag-a-day strip in the Flemish magazine Kerk en Leven. After moving to another newspaper, Het Volk, in 1958, Jommeke became a full length adventure comic strip, while Nys also continued Jommeke gag pages in 't Kapoentje. Jommeke has sold 51 million albums in Belgium alone, which means an average of about 4.5 albums per person. This makes Jommeke the best-selling comic book series in Belgium behind Suske en Wiske. There's also a newspaper for children called "Jommekeskrant", which is delivered weekly together with popular Belgian newspaper "Het Nieuwsblad". By 2021, the comic strip's publisher is switched to Standaard Uitgeverij.

== Main characters ==
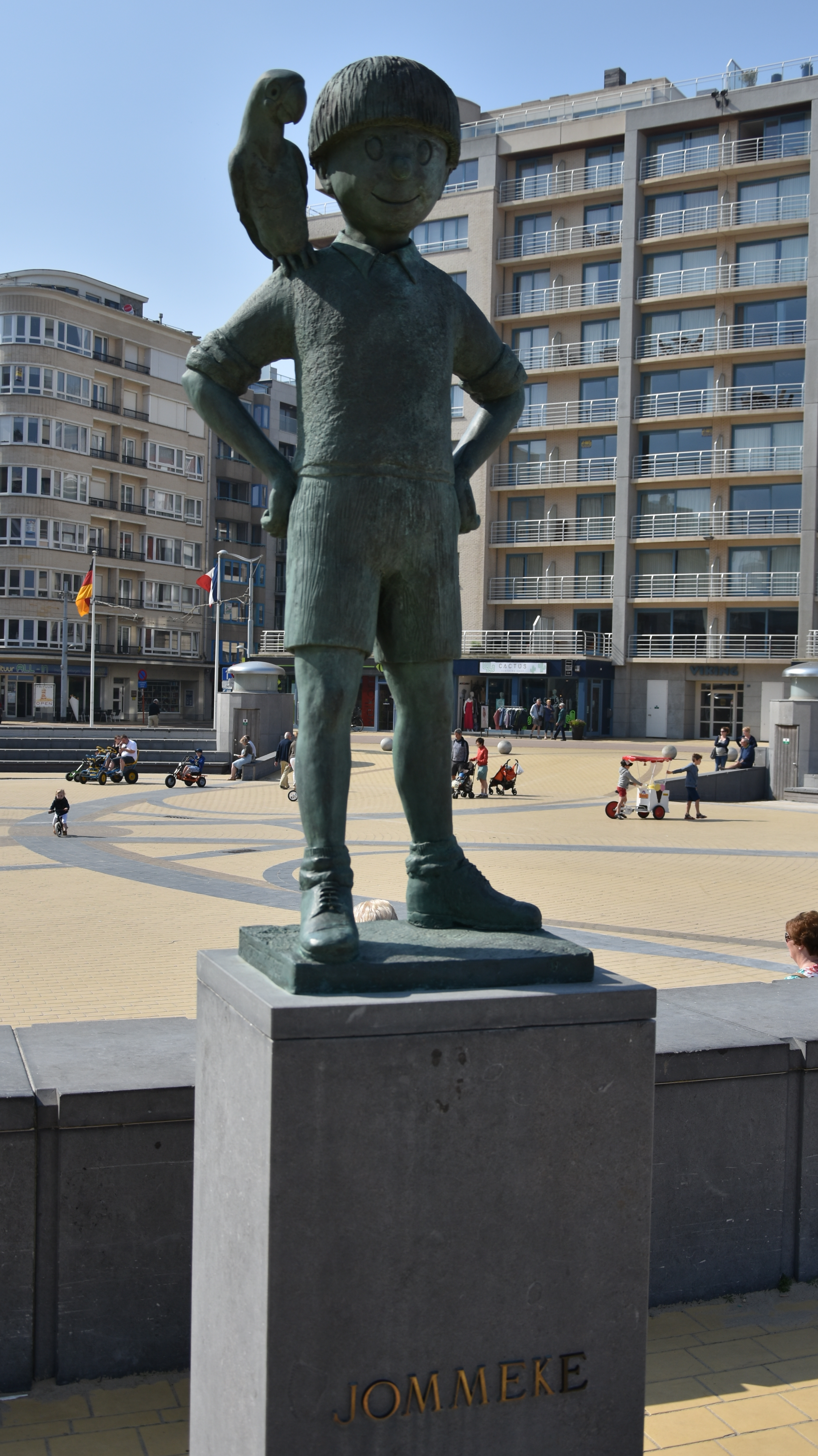
Statue of Jommeke and his parrot Flip in Middelkerke

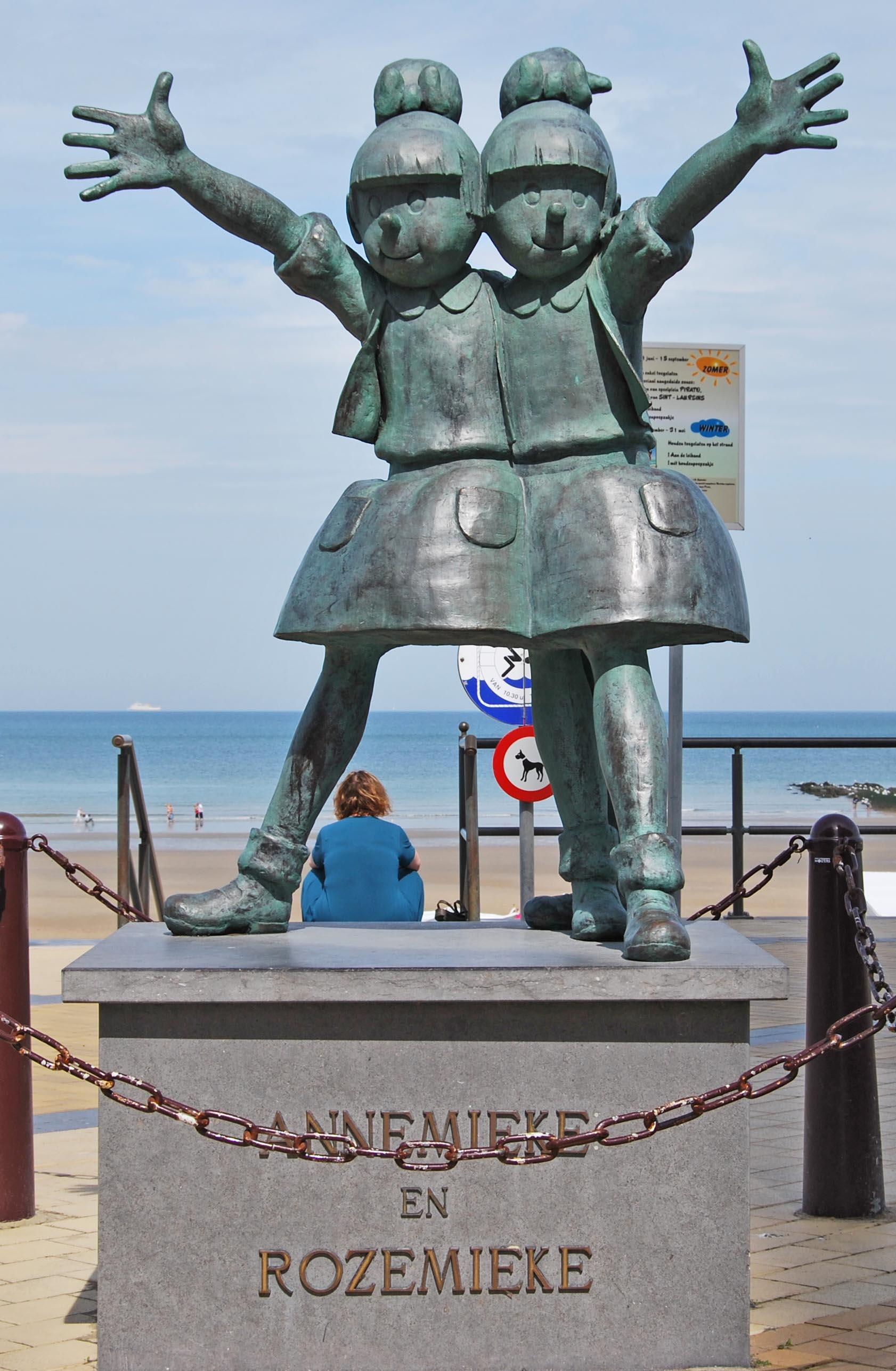
Statue of Annemieke and Rozemieke in Middelkerke

- Jommeke: An 11-year-old boy who lives with his parents in Zonnedorp. He has a parrot named Flip who accompanies him everywhere. He is clever, honest, brave, loves adventure, and is recognizable by his distinct blonde haircut.
- Flip: A red-winged, green parrot who is Jommeke's pet. Flip is able to talk like a human and is highly intelligent, if somewhat arrogant. His real name is "Filipus", but he prefers "Flip". He is cool-headed and has on several occasions saved the day using his wit and his unique abilities as a bird such as flying, using his beak and taking advantage of his small size to spy and sneak. Although his age is unspecified, he has shown adult behavior, on a few rare occasions, by consuming alcohol and smoking cigars. He is also quite the womanizer, usually unsuccessfully, due to the fact he is a parrot and not a human.
- Filiberke: Jommeke's best friend, Filiberke joins him on most of his adventures. His pitch-black hair color contrasts nicely with the protagonist. He is creative, and a bit odd too. Many albums start with Filiberke engaging in some crazy activity relating to the main story (e.g. he's "playing a cucumber" at the start of album 146 Komkommer in 't zuur). He also often pretends to be sick to the annoyance of the other characters.
- Pekkie: Filiberke's black poodle.
- Annemieke and Rozemieke: Two identical twin girls, notable for their pony-tails. Their names are often shortened to "The Miekes". They are also good friends with Jommeke. Annemieke even has somewhat of a crush on Jommeke, and Rozemieke on Filiberke. The Miekes are notable for their motherly traits, including cooking and washing.
- Choco: Choco is a chimpanzee in a sailor suit. He is the Miekes' pet. He earned his nickname due to the fact that he loves to eat chocolate spread (or "choco", as it is named in Belgian Dutch.)
- Professor Gobelijn: An absent-minded professor, notable for his large walrus moustache. He is good-hearted, but frequently makes mistakes because of his absent-mindedness. For instance, he states the exact opposite of what he means, only to correct it immediately afterwards: I.e. "We will arrive next year, I mean tomorrow", "I have completely forgotten, I mean I remember it now." His inventions include pills that make people fly, a car that runs on grass, a submarine in the shape of a whale etc. In "Purpere Pillen" (Purple Pills) Jommeke and Filiberke saved Gobelijn's life. A plaque on his mansion states that he is a "Professor in Everything", i.e. he has a degree on any subject imaginable.
- Anatool: The main antagonist of the series. He is an untrustworthy butler who often resorts to theft and often fulfills the role of antagonist in the stories. He always wears old-fashioned shoes with elevated heels.
- Kwak and Boemel: Two hoboes who live in an underground house in the middle of the forest. Sometimes they side with Jommeke and his friends, but most of the time they are their opponents. They don't shy away from stealing, kidnapping and collaborating with Anatool to get rich. Also notable are their speech impediments. Kwak makes unnecessary use of the letter "h" in front of words that start with a vowel. Boemel switches the letters "b" and "p" and the letters "d" and "t" in every word he says.
- De Koningin van Onderland: Prutelia van Achterberg, better known as "The Queen of Onderland", is a mentally ill woman who thinks she is a queen. She is Jommeke's most dangerous and ruthless opponent and the true villain of the series. She frequently escapes from her local asylum and then flees to her castle in Zonnedorp. In the third album "De Koningin van Onderland" (1959) she kidnapped all the children in Zonnedorp to become her personal slaves.

== List of albums ==
As of June 2020, the following Jommeke albums exist:

1. De jacht op een voetbal
2. De zingende aap
3. De koningin van Onderland
4. Purperen pillen
5. De muzikale Bella
6. Het hemelhuis
7. De zwarte bomma
8. De ooievaar van Begonia
9. De schildpaddenschat
10. De straalvogel
11. De zonnemummie
12. Paradijseiland
13. Het Jampuddingspook
14. Op heksenjacht
15. Het staartendorp
16. De gouden jaguar
17. Diep in de put
18. Met Fifi op reis
19. Wie zoekt die vindt
20. Apen in huis
21. Het verkeerde land
22. Het wonderdrankje
23. Dolle fratsen
24. De verloren zoon
25. De zeven snuifdozen
26. Kinderen baas
27. Geheime opdracht
28. De Samsons
29. De vliegende ton
30. Jommeke in de Far West
31. Knappe Mataboe
32. In Pimpeltjesland
33. Jacht op Gobelijn
34. Jommeke in de knel
35. Gekke grappen
36. Neuzen bij de vleet
37. De schat van de zeerover
38. Kaas met gaatjes
39. Lieve Choco
40. Anakwaboe
41. Twee halve lappen
42. De witte bolhoed
43. Filiberke gaat trouwen
44. De Jommekesclub
45. De zeepkoning
46. De tocht naar Asnapije
47. Diamanten in de zoo
48. De zilveren giraf
49. De groene maskers
50. De plastieken walvis
51. De fwietmachine
52. De zingende oorbellen
53. Het kristallen eendje
54. Broeder Anatolius
55. Tita Telajora
56. De vruchtenmakers
57. Het geheim van Macu Ancapa
58. De strijd om de Incaschat
59. De Kuko-eieren
60. Alarm in de rode baai
61. De hoed van Napoleon
62. Luilekkerland
63. Madam Pepermunt
64. De kristallen grot
65. De grasmobiel
66. De vrolijke bende
67. De slaapkop
68. De gele spin
69. Straffa Toebaka
70. De verborgen tempel
71. De sprekende ezel
72. Choco ontvoerd
73. De gekke wekker
74. De Kikiwikies
75. Prinses Pott
76. Het rode oog
77. Peuterweelde
78. Juffrouw Perlefinneke
79. Het plezante kliekske
80. De njam-njambloem
81. De luchtzwemmers
82. Opstand in Kokowoko
83. De stenen aapjes
84. De Plank van Jan Haring
85. De granda papiljan
86. De lustige slurvers
87. De stad in de vulkaan
88. Jommeke in Bobbejaanland
89. Het piepende bed
90. De kleine professor
91. Prins Filiberke
92. Het aards paradijs
93. De haaienrots
94. De supervrouw
95. Melanie
96. Paniek rond Odilon
97. De valse kameel
98. De kaart van Wawa Wang
99. De grote knoeiboel
100. Het jubilee
101. Het monster in de ruïne
102. De vampier van Drakenburg
103. De bron van El Razar
104. De vlucht van Bella
105. De knook van Azmor
106. Zoete Mosterd
107. De pestkopjes
108. De sidderplanten
109. Guitenstreken
110. De viool van Varazdina
111. De olijke oliemannen
112. Het ei van de smartlapvogel
113. In de greep van Mac Rum
114. Het kriebelkruid
115. De lappenpop van Anatool
116. De gelukzoekers
117. De stenen handdruk
118. De bedrogen miljonair
119. Het apencircus
120. De vlag van Lord Chester
121. De rare doedelzak
122. Het Boheems schommelpaard
123. De schat van Angkor
124. Het geheimzinnige eiland
125. Drie in een slag
126. Het bal van Mathilde
127. De watervallen van Svanjabak
128. De grote zeilrace
129. De whiskymaker
130. Het geheim van Ambiorix
131. De kippen van Gobelijn
132. De spookkrater
133. Het gekkegas
134. De prinsen van Snoby
135. De kruik van Aztrakan
136. Het monster uit de diepte
137. Apen te koop
138. De rib van Kalafar
139. De blauwe grot
140. De Chinese kast
141. De bruid van El Toro
142. De documenten van Langneus
143. Va Kwak en moe Boemel
144. De pijp van Geurig Gras
145. Het levenselixir
146. Komkommer in 't zuur
147. Het Yacochacabeeldje
148. De vliegende brigade
149. De grote puzzel
150. De gestoorde zeereis
151. Het meermonster
152. S.O.S. Benistal
153. Het hoofd van Samos
154. De hellestokers
155. De kleine vandaal
156. De superster
157. De koningin van Kachar El Nachar
158. Het probleem van Jeff Klaxon
159. De kokoskoe
160. De verdroogde bron
161. Drie toverstokjes
162. De zwarte parel
163. Het Midasmysterie
164. Het verdwenen kasteel
165. Spaghetti met kaas
166. De mandoline van Caroline
167. De appelvreters
168. Het heksenbal
169. De slangegodin
170. Het Chocokomplot
171. De goudvis van Filiberke
172. Fifi in de knoei
173. Het geheim van de hoefslag
174. Het zevende zwaard
175. De verdwaalde vuurtoren
176. De snoezige dino's
177. Kwistig kwissen
178. Het bedreigde paradijs
179. Paniek op de Akropolis
180. Filicasso
181. De valse papegaai
182. Het zingende moeras
183. Berta Gobelijn
184. De kroon van Kazimir
185. De modekoningin
186. De pruik van Anatool
187. De zwarte cactus
188. De vurige inktvis
189. De koppige cobra
190. Alarm in het begijnhof
191. De magische spiegel
192. De drietand van Neptunus
193. De zilveren traan
194. Dinopolis
195. Gerommel in de Far West
196. De Elfenbron
197. Het schuimspook
198. De Kraaienburcht
199. De vergeten mijn
200. Stefanie Stekkebeen
201. De Kovonita's
202. De panda van Wanda
203. De lachende mango's
204. De verdwenen tuinkabouter
205. De kopermicroben
206. De ring van Mac Rum
207. De geniale malloten
208. Het raadsel van Kiekebilleke
209. Blinkende knopen
210. Het pompoenenkasteel
211. De geest van Anakwaboe
212. De limonadelelies
213. Zeven sterren
214. Holeman
215. De kimono van Yamamatsu
216. De laatste viking
217. Zoektocht naar Sorab
218. Het blauwe prieeltje
219. Operatie Bonsaï
220. De frietbaron
221. Wowofski
222. Strijd om de bizon
223. De komkommerprinses
224. De rare kwibussen
225. De erfenis van Sorgeloos
226. Het luchtkasteel
227. Het brein van Gobelijn
228. De goudkoorts van Anatool
229. Het slimme varken
230. Pekkie in Hollywood
231. Het zeemeerdinges
232. Duel in Venetië
233. Paljaskof
234. De pechvogel
235. Mama Mataboe
236. De dobbelmannetjes
237. Het roze olifantje
238. Kamperen is plezant
239. Graaf Dondersteen
240. De beer op sokken
241. Nobelprijs voor Gobelijn
242. De puddingkoningin
243. Het zwarte prikgevaar
244. Groene Haring
245. Het vreemde avontuur
246. Filiberke en Biliferke
247. Krokodillentranen
248. Fifi kampioen
249. Het Oké-parfum
250. Savooien op de Galapagos
251. Schattenjagers in Bokrijk
252. Het Spookdorp
253. Choko verliefd
254. Paradijseiland in gevaar
255. De clanstrijd
256. De blauwe wenssteen
257. Tobias Snuffel
258. De kwakzalver
259. Storm aan zee
260. Oost west, thuis best
261. De recordjagers
262. De brulharp
263. De Keizer van Tuktut
264. De wens van Amma-Moai
265. De papegaaienbruiloft
266. Pannenkoeken van Pierehaar
267. Olmek en Toltek
268. Prins Carnaval
269. De lawaai-eter
270. De gestrande pennenzak
271. De koning van Bananopia
272. De boemerang van kirimbir
273. Odilon vermist
274. Baron Anatolsky
275. Chaos in Pimpeltjesland
276. De onderwatertoerist
277. De babbelpil
278. Het Nianmonster
279. Fifi de speurneus
280. De Vogelvriend
281. Bollywood in Bellewaerde
282. School op stelten
283. De notenkraker
284. De redding van Doris Dada
285. In de klauwen van Prutelia
286. Missie Middelkerke
287. Het kistje van Sir Pimpeldon
288. De zwarte diamant
289. De rondekoning
290. De ideeëndief
291. Pampa en de blauwe duif
292. De roodstaartpapegaai
293. Balletkoorts
294. De wraak van de mummies
295. De Jungfrau smelt!
296. De vuurdraak
297. Speelgoed overboord
298. De schrik van Onderland
299. De Flipposaurus
300. De plasticjagers
301. Feest in Zonnedorp
302. De sneeuwmaker
303. De atchoembloem
304. Het probleem Gobelijn
305. Het verdwenen hoefijzer
306. Rubberman
307. De valse kerstman
308. Het verpeste kamp
309. De schat van niemand
310. Project Pegasus
311. De Jampuddingcup
312. De Zonnedorp kampioen!
313. Monster in Zonnedorp
314. Griezels in het woud
315. Rare vogels
316. Op stap met generaal Vlamkruit
317. De ruimtereis van Piki
318. De drie geesten van kerst
319. Bie en de superbijen
320. Het ongeluksbeeldje
321. Stoute Choco
322. Potvis Valentijn
323. Superkwak en Megaboemel
324. De sterren van Zonnedorp
325. Spoken op school
326. Grootouderbal
327. Trammelant in het Verkeerde Land
328. Het staatsgeheim
329. Over koetjes en ezels
330. De sneeuwster

== Translations ==
Apart from some editions for the Netherlands, Jommeke has been translated into English, French and German.

A German edition was published from 1971 until around 1980 and lasted 32 volumes (the original comics were printed out of order and volumes 27-28 do not exist!) by Gemini Verlag (1-18) and Europress (19-26, 29-34). The series title was (Die tollen Abenteuer von) Peter + Alexander, obviously a play of words on Austrian actor and singer Peter Alexander.

In 2011, German editor stainlessART began republishing the German version of Jommeke, keeping original names and places. As of April 2021, 26 titles have been published in this series.

The series was also published in translation as Jeremy in Indonesia, by children's book publisher BIP (Bhuana Ilmu Populer) in 2013.

In 2018, a Chinese translation was published in cooperation with Bright Media, with an initial run of 25 titles.

== Jommeke in other media ==
In 1968, Jef Nys directed a live-action film called "De Schat van de Zeerover" ("The Pirate's Treasure"), which was a low-budget adaptation of the eponymous Jommeke album. It was essentially an amateur project, made by him and his family members and starred his own son in the main role.

== Jommeke in popular culture ==
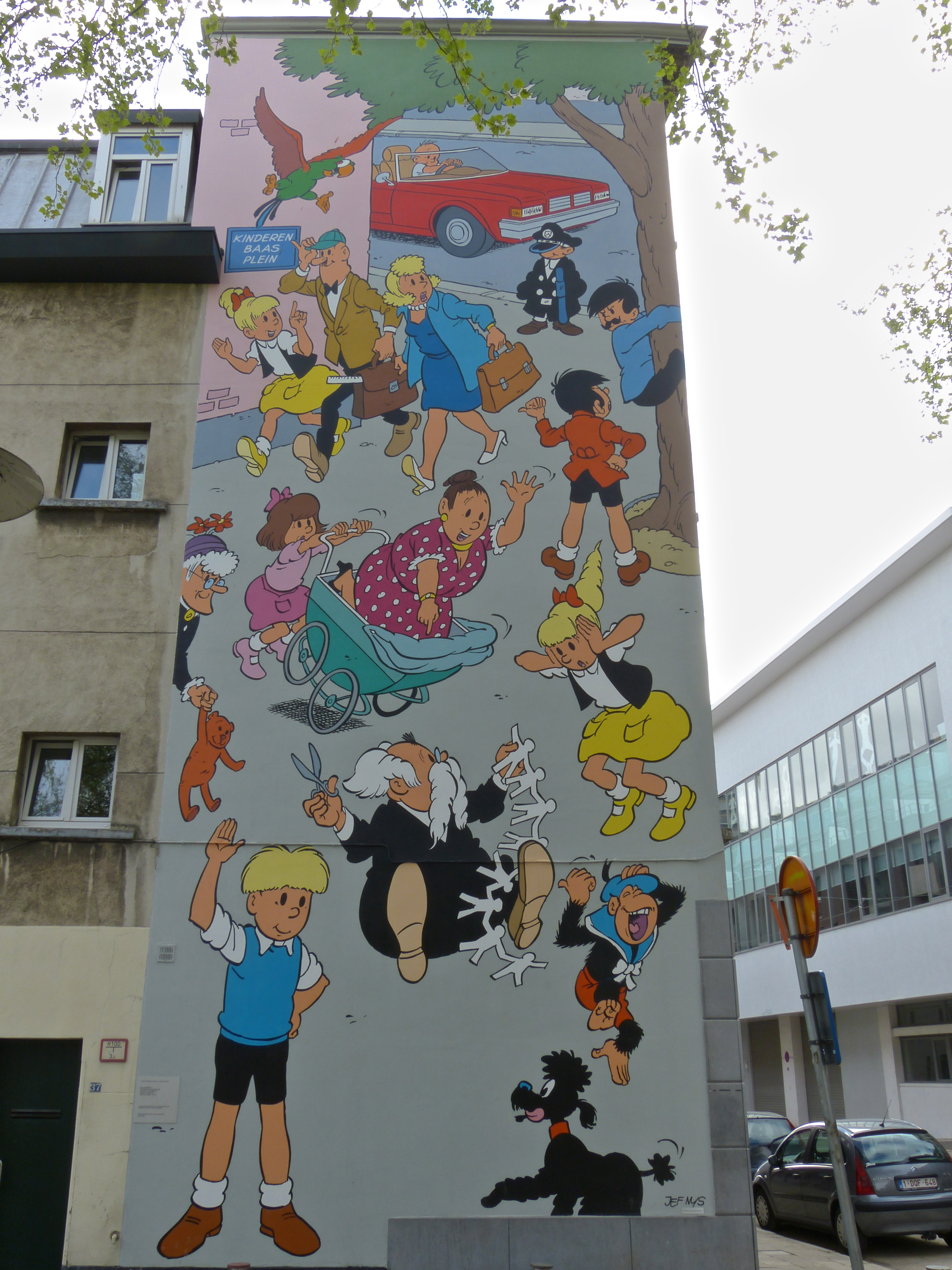
Mural painting in Antwerp

On 31 July 1997 Jommeke was the first comic book character to receive his own statue in Middelkerke, in front of the casino. It was sculpted by Valeer Peirsman. On 26 March 2014 Jommeke's statue became a victim of vandalism. It had to be restored and was placed back again on 28 June 2014. On 29 July 2006 Annemieke and Rozemieke also received a statue in Middelkerke, near the Theresiastraat. It was sculpted by Monique Mol. In 2015, it was announced that two other characters from the franchise, Filiberke and Pekkie, would also receive statues on the Zeedijk of Middelkerke.

On 18 June 2011 a wall depicting Jommeke characters was inaugurated near the Frans Halsplein in Antwerp.

On 27 May 2015 a special comic book wall was made in the Lokvogelstraat in Laeken, Belgium. It features a huge wall painting starring Jommeke and the main cast members.
