= Het Volk =

Het Volk may refer to:

- Het Volk (newspaper), Flanders, Belgium
- Oomlop Het Volk, now called the Omloop Het Nieuwsblad, a semi-classic one-day bicycle race in Flanders, Belgium, sponsored by the newspaper
- Het Volk (political party), Transvaal political party (1907–1910)
- Het Volk (Netherlands), daily newspaper of the Dutch Social Democratic Workers' Party founded in 1900
