= LaClaire =

LaClaire or LaClair is a French surname literally meaning "The Clear". It is uncommon and quite rare especially in North America.

The LaClaire moved to the United States in the early 20th century, from where they spread throughout North America including Canada.

The following have the surname

- Delphine LaClair, fictional character in the British soap opera Emmerdale

== See also ==
- Claire (given name)
- Saint Clair (disambiguation)
- Leclair
