= Clerk (disambiguation) =

A clerk is someone who works in an office. A retail clerk works in a store.

== Office holder ==
Clerk(s) may also refer to a person who holds an office, most commonly in a local unit of government, or a court.

- Barristers' clerk, a manager and administrator in a set of barristers' chambers
- Clerk (municipal official)
- Court clerk
- Clerk of the Supreme Court of the United States
- Clerk of the Closet, held by a diocesan bishop
- Deputy Clerk of the Closet, the Domestic Chaplain to the Sovereign of the United Kingdom
- Patent clerk, or Patent examiner
- Clerk (legislature)
  - Clerk of the Privy Council (Canada)
  - Clerk of the House of Commons, in the United Kingdom
  - Clerk of the Parliaments, in the United Kingdom
  - Clerk of the United States House of Representatives

=== Former titles ===
- Clerk of the Green Cloth, in the British Royal Household
- Clerk of the Peace, in England and Wales

== Non-government titles ==
- Clerk (Quaker), an administrative role within the Religious Society of Friends
- Clerk (choral), an adult member of the choir at certain Colleges at Oxford and Cambridge Universities
- Clerk of works, in the UK, a tradesman who oversees a construction site

== Films and related media ==
- Clerks (film), a 1994 American film by Kevin Smith
  - Clerks II, 2006 American film sequel by Kevin Smith
  - Clerks III, 2022 American film sequel by Kevin Smith
  - Clerks (soundtrack)
  - Clerks (comics), based on the film and published in the late 1990s by Oni Press
  - Clerks: The Animated Series, a 2000–2002 American television series
- Clerk (1989 film), a Bollywood film starring Manoj Kumar
- Clerk (2021 film), a documentary film about the life and career of filmmaker Kevin Smith

== Other uses ==
- Clerk (surname), derived from the occupation

== See also ==
- Cleric (disambiguation), related word
- "The Clerk's Tale", a story by Geoffrey Chaucer
- Klerk
