= Leclercq =

Leclercq, LeClercq, or Le Clercq (French pronunciation: [ləklɛʁ]) is a surname, and may refer to:

- Arnaud Leclercq (born 1967), French author
- Auguste Bouché-Leclercq, French historian
- Carlotta Leclercq (1838–1893), British actor
- Chrétien Le Clercq, 17th century, New France missionary
- Daniel Leclercq (1949–2019), football player
- Eugène Leclercq (1832–1908), draughts world champion
- Fabien Leclercq (born 1972), French footballer
- Frédéric Leclercq (born 1978), bassist
- Gaston LeClercq (c.1904–1944), Belgian long-distance runner
- Hugo Pierre Leclercq (born 1994), better known by his stage name Madeon, a French DJ.
- Jacques Leclercq (1891–1971), Belgian theologian and priest
- Jean Leclercq (disambiguation), several people
- Jean-Claude Leclercq (born 1962), French bicycle racer
- Jean-Marc Leclercq, French singer
- Jeanne Leclercq (1868–1914), French opera singer
- Julien Leclercq (disambiguation), several people
- Michel Leclercq, French billionaire businessman
- Olivier Leclercq, French businessman
- Patrick Leclercq (born 1938), Minister of State of Monaco
- Robin Leclercq (born 1952), French former footballer
- Rose Leclercq (1843–1899), English actor
- Solomon Leclercq (1745–1792), French martyr and saint
- Suzanne Leclercq (1901–1994), Belgian paleobotanist
- Tanaquil LeClercq (1929–2000), ballet dancer

== See also ==
- LeClerc (similar spelling)
