= Ons Volkske =

Flemish newspaper youth supplement

Ons Volkske (literally: "Our little people") was the youth supplement of the Flemish newspaper Ons Volk Ontwaakt. It was published without interruption from 1932 until 1988, except for the years during World War II. The magazine was notable for its comics and together with 't Kapoentje it was the most important comic book magazine in Flanders.

== History ==
On 25 September 1932 the first issue of Ons Volkske was published by n.v. Periodica. All comics in the magazine were drawn by Eugeen Hermans, aka "Pink", except for Adamson by Danish cartoonist Oscar Jacobsson. During the Nazi occupation from 1940 until 1945 all production was ceased, but from 11 March 1945 it was republished. After 42 issues it became an independent weekly magazine. In 1947 the newspaper De Standaard put a claim on the title "Ons Volk". As a result, several comics were continued in the new comic book magazine 't Kapoentje. On 1 May 1947 "Ons Volkske" became a newspaper supplement again, only to become independent again from 13 January 1949. The magazine was very popular during the 1940s, 1950s and 1960s, but like most comic magazines its sales started to plummet in the decades that came afterwards. In 1988 it was disestablished.

== Legacy ==
Ons Volkske published mostly Belgian and Dutch comics artists, the most notable being Marc Sleen (Piet Fluwijn en Bolleke), Willy Vandersteen (De Vrolijke Bengels), Bob de Moor, Piet van Elk, Henk Albers, Albert van Beek, Gommaar Timmermans, Hurey, Gilbert Declercq, Gert Ronde, Karel Verschuere, Jacques Van Melkebeke, Jo-El Azara, Tibet, and reprints of series that were published in Tintin before. Due to its low price and cheaper print paper "Ons Volkske" gained the nickname "the poor man's version of Tintin", but despite that it was still the trend-setting comic book magazine in Flanders and sold very well during its heyday.
