= Jef Nys =

Belgian comic book creator

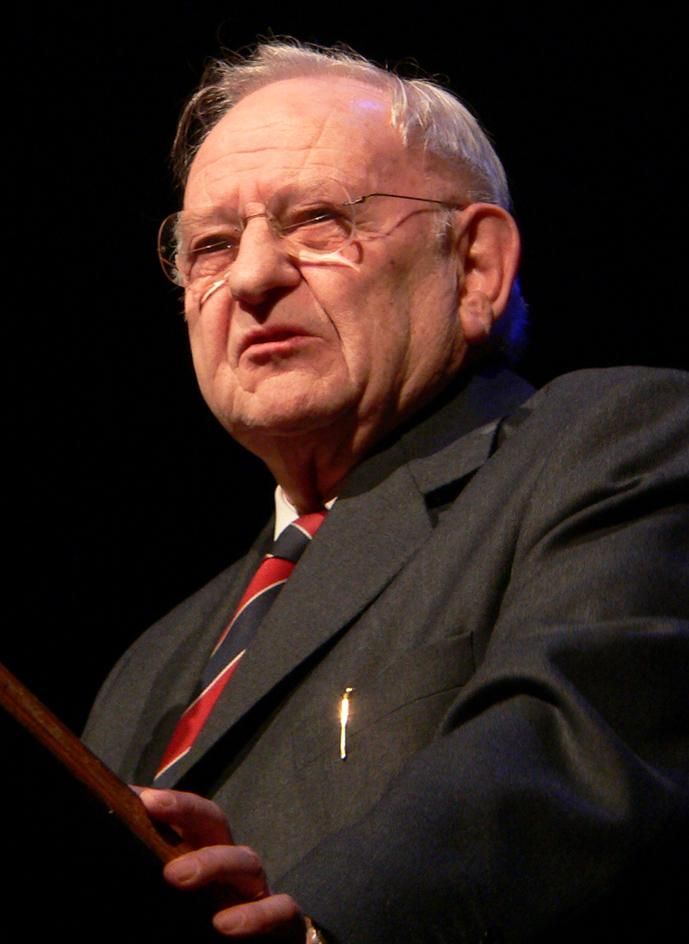
- Jef Nys in 2005
- Born: Jozef Nys; 30 January 1927 Berchem, Belgium
- Died: 20 October 2009 (aged 82) Wilrijk, Belgium
- Areas: Cartoonist, Writer, Artist
- Notable works: Jommeke

Jozef "Jef" Nys (30 January 1927 – 20 October 2009) was a Belgian comic book creator. He was best known for his comic strip Jommeke.

== Biography ==
=== Early years ===
Jozef Nys was born in Berchem, Belgium in 1927. His family came from Koksijde, at the Belgian coast, where his grandfather was a fisherman. Jef Nys' father Hendrik moved to Antwerp after World War I, and worked in the port. Hendrik Nys married Louise Van Den Bos on 5 August 1922. Her father was a council member in Berchem and worked as a painter. He had a great influence on the young Jef. Hendrik and Louise Nys had four children, two of whom died at a young age. Hendrik Nys died in 1941 when he was run over by a car while riding his bike.

When Jef Nys was 5 years old, he went to school in Berchem. He was a good student and a better artist, and when he was 11 years old, he started with drawing classes in the evening at the municipal art school. The most important of his teachers were Lode De Maeyer and Oscar Depoorter, renowned painters. Another field he excelled in at school was writing essays and stories. Aged 13, he had to choose his field of study, and decided to go the technical school of Antwerp to become a technical engineer. Because he was still too young, he first had to stay one year at the technical school of Borgerhout, where he again got very good results. He no longer had the time to go to the local art school, but continued to draw, making caricatures of the teachers, and portraits of pioneers in the field of electricity to decorate the classroom.

His teachers, seeing his talent, urged him to drop his technical studies and to focus solely on his art. In 1943, he entered the Royal Academy of Fine Arts of Antwerp, led by Baron Isidoor Opsomer, where one of his teachers was Jan Van Der Loo, a portrettist. Here Nys got the background and craftmanship that would serve him throughout his career. At the same time, Jef Nys started working at AFIM, a small animation studio, with his fellow student Bob de Moor and Ray Goossens. But when the academy became aware of this, he had to quit his job at the studio to stay at the academy. He continued his studies until the academy closed down due to the threat of V-1 flying bombs.

After the war, he started working at 't Pallieterke, a satirical weekly newspaper, where he made political cartoons, illustrations, and his first comics. As a child, Nys had seen Snow White and the Seven Dwarfs, and it had made a lasting impression on him. In 1947, this inspired him to send a letter to the Walt Disney Company with some samples of his work, hoping to be offered a job there. Although the company was not hiring at the time, the rejection letter was otherwise very encouraging, stating that "Your work was extremely interesting and enjoyed very much by those in the studio who judged it[...]" and "It is the opinion of our art critics that your samples show considerable ability and properly developed and applied, you should go far in an art career" Between 1946 and 1955, he made some short-lived comics (both comic strips and stop comics) for different newspapers, mainly the Gazet van Antwerpen. For Het Handelsblad he produced his first longer series, Amedeus en Seppeke. Meanwhile, he had to fulfill his military duty from 1952 until 1957, working every Saturday with the Air Defense.

=== Jommeke ===
Jommeke started on 30 October 1955 as a one-page gag comic about a boy of about 6 years old, created for a very popular weekly parochial newspaper Kerkelijk Leven (a weekly circulation of over 500,000 copies on a population of less than 6 million), which had some redactorial pages (including the comic) for the whole of Flanders, and local pages for every parish. The last page of Jommeke appeared in Kerkelijk Leven on 2 November 1958. These gags were collected in three books in 1957 and 1958. In the same newspaper he created 5 biographical comics between 1955 and March 1959, which also appeared as albums in those years.

When Jommeke started appearing in the daily newspaper Het Volk on 1 November 1958, it changed into a comic story of 44 pages about an 11-year-old, with his friends and family. Every day, he made 2 strips, in the tradition of the Flemish newspaper comics like Spike and Suzy and Nero, but aimed at a younger audience and with fewer political comments. The series was partially based on his older series Amedeus en Seppeke, reusing some characters and story lines. He also continued the production of biographical, more realistic stories, which are now published in 't Kapoentje, the weekly juvenile supplement to Het Volk. The last of the seven appeared in 1964.

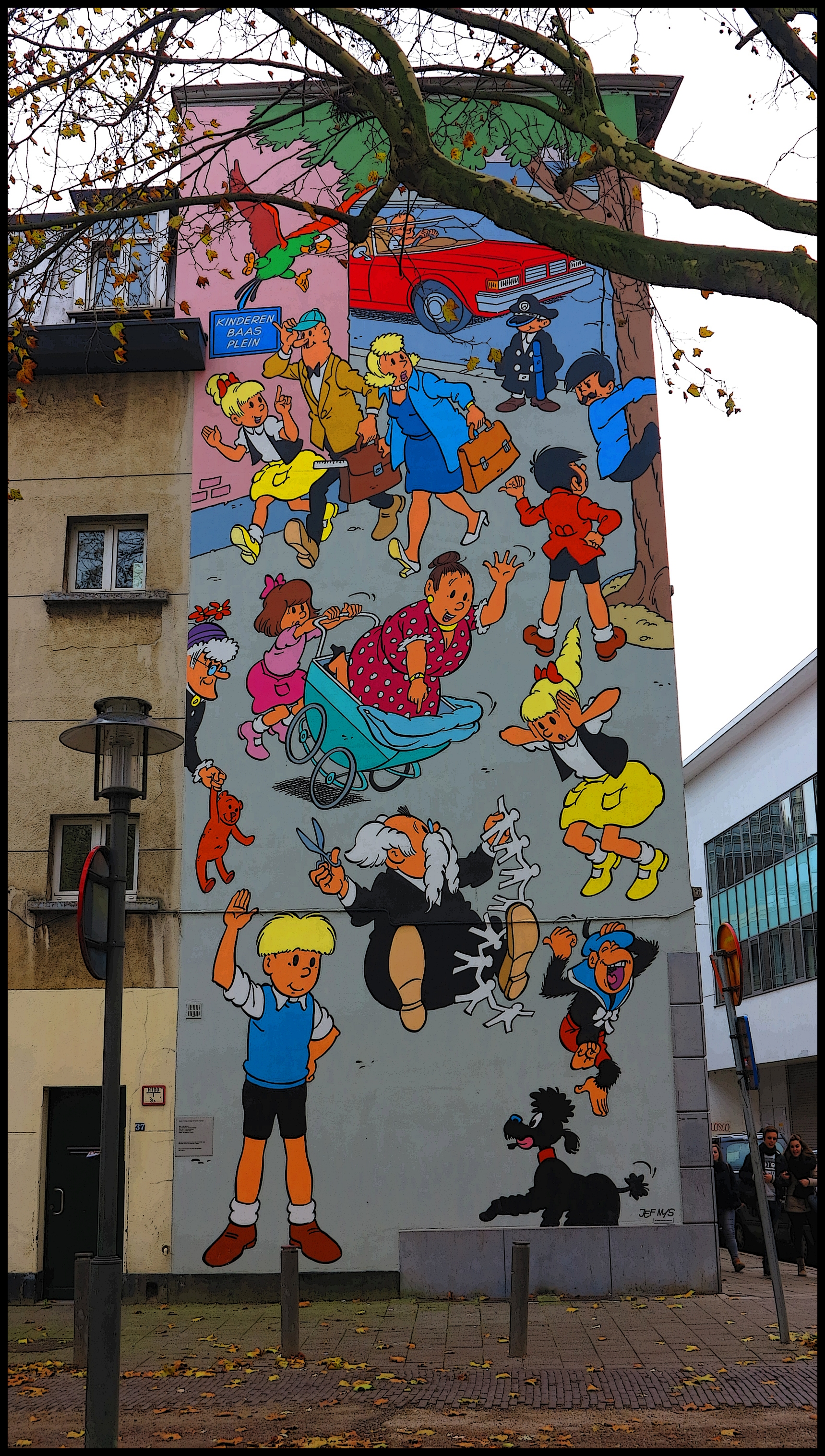
Jommeke mural in Antwerp

Nys also started in 1963 the fairytale comic Langteen en Schommelbuik (Longtoe and Wobblebelly), which ended after 11 stories because the work on Jommeke became too time-consuming. The stories, a spin-off of some figures from the 14th story of Jommeke, were a result of his fascination with the work of Disney. They reappeared in the 168th Jommeke story. Apart from the continuous stories in the newspaper, a few hundred weekly Jommeke gags appeared on the back cover of the Flemish comic magazine Ohee. When in 1965 Marc Sleen left Het Volk, Jef Nys took over his series De Lustige Kapoentjes for two years. After this, he worked solely on Jommeke. The series became one of the most popular in Flanders, with loads of merchandising and surrounding publications. A 1967 low budget movie did not become a huge success, with some 30,000 viewers. But the comics sold more each year, raising from 350,000 copies in 1965 to 1 million in 1970. Every year since, at least 1 million copies have been sold, and in 1976 and 1979 more than 2 million Jommeke books were sold. Every new book has an initial printing of some 100,000 copies. The first album, De jacht op een voetbal, is the most often reprinted, with 23 reprints and a total of 448,000 copies sold in 2005. From 1971 on, Jef Nys could no longer handle all the work alone and started using contributors, at first as inkers, later also for the writing and drawing of the stories. Nevertheless, he would personally follow up all the work, often taking home drawings to correct them, until very close to his death in 2009. This tight control over Jommeke will reach beyond his demise, since he specified in his testament that the series should be continued, alongside a list of specifications that would guard the overall spirit of the Jommeke universe (no violence, no sexual content, no changes to the overall appearance of the protagonists...). From 1989 until 2005, the weekly youth supplement of Het Volk was called the Jommekeskrant.

Nys spent many years working exclusively for Catholic newspapers and magazines, producing numerous biographies of religious figures. However, in 1970, he and his wife divorced and broke up with the Catholic Church.

As of October 2009, 248 albums and more than 50 million copies of Jommeke have been sold. Although some of the comics have been translated in French ("Gil et Jo"), English ("Jeremy") and German ("Peter und Alexander"), the series has only been truly successful in Flanders, where Nys was considered as one of the four great comic artists, together with Willy Vandersteen, Marc Sleen and Bob de Moor.

== Bibliography ==
- De avonturen van Kadodderke (The adventures of Kadodderke) in 't Pallieterke' , 1946
- Adam leeft nog (Adam still lives) in 't Pallieterke' , 1948
- De Familie Knol (The Family Knol) in 't Pallieterke' , 1948
- De lotgevallen van Jef Neus (Whatever happened to Jef Nose) in Gazet van Antwerpen, 1952–1955
- Amadeus en Seppeke (Amadeus and Seppeke), 4 stories in Het Handelsblad, 1954–1955
- Jommeke in Kerkelijk Leven, 1955–1958
- Five biographies (Pieter Breughel, Berten Rodenbach, Pius X, Bernadette and Godelieve van Gistel) in Kerkelijk Leven, 1955–1959
- Six biographies (Johannes XXIII and five other lives of priests and missionaries, including one of Pierre-Jean De Smet) in 't Kapoentje, 1958–1965
- Langteen en Schommelbuik, 11 stories in 't Kapoentje, from 1963 on
- De Lustige Kapoentjes (The joyful rascals) in 't Kapoentje, 1965–1967
- De Jommekesclub (The Jommeke club) in Ohee, from 1970 on
- Jommeke in Het Volk, more than 200 adventures from 1958 on

Regular albums have appeared for Jommeke, Langteen en Schommelbuik, De Lustige Kapoentjes, and his biographies. Most of his other works have appeared in limited, bibliophile editions. Currently, only Jommeke and Langteen en Schommelbuik are easily available in shops.

== Awards and honours ==
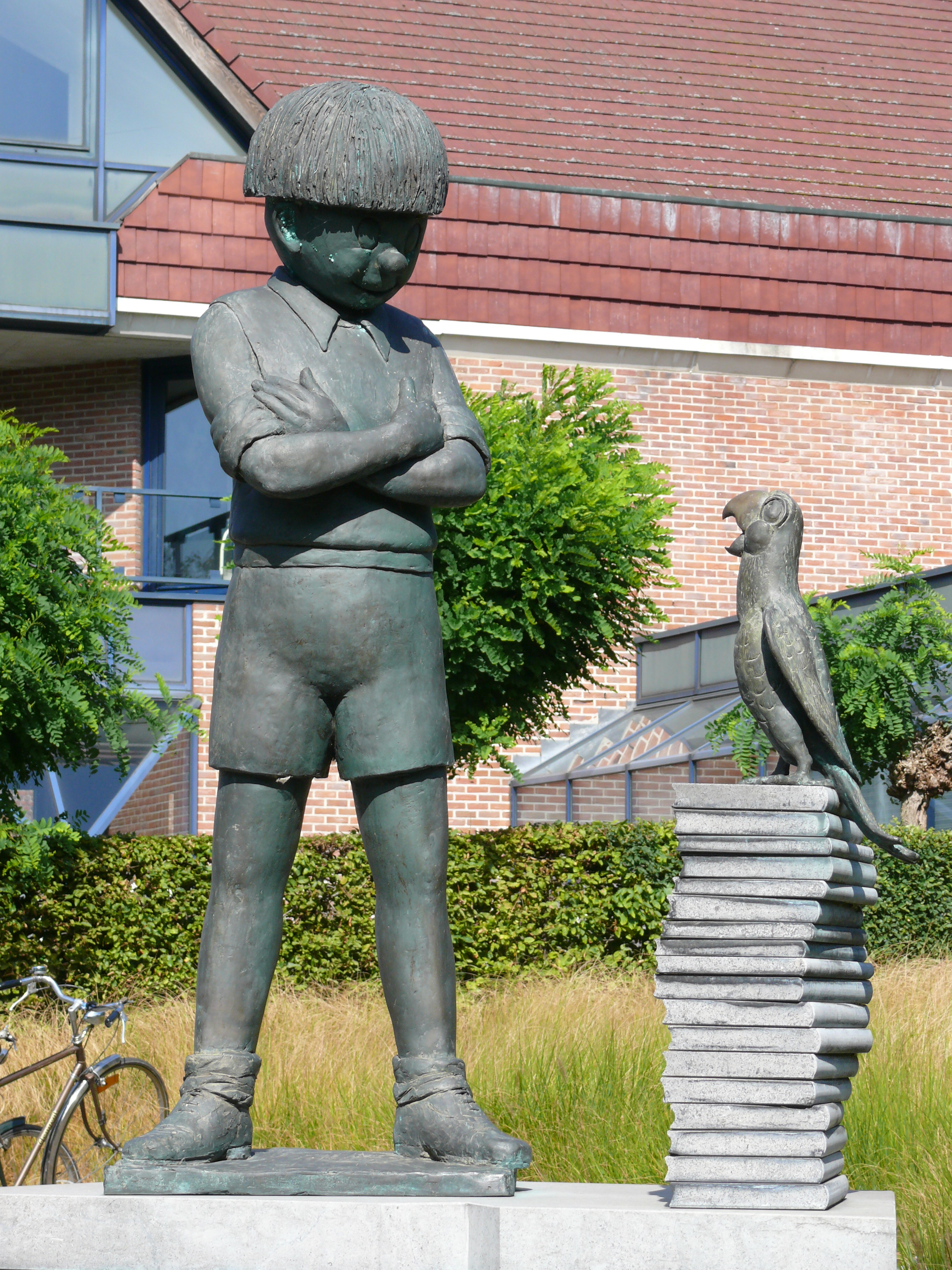
Statue of Jommeke in Temse

- 1988: A first Jommeke statue in Beveren, Belgium
- 1992: Honorary citizen of Koksijde, Belgium
- 1995: Honorary citizen of Durbuy, Belgium
- 1997: A statue of Jommeke in Middelkerke, Belgium
- 1997: A stamp issued by the Belgian Post
- 1998: A medal issued by the Belgian National Bank
- 1998: A statue of Jommeke in Temse, Belgium
- 2004: Bronzen Stripvos, awarded by Vlaamse Onafhankelijke Stripgilde
- 2005: Gouden Adhemar at Strip Turnhout, Belgium, for his entire career
- 2005: Gold pencil for his entire career.
- 2005: A mosaic of Jommeke in Wilrijk, Belgium
- 2006: A statue of Annemieke and Rozemieke (from the Jommeke comic) in Middelkerke
- 2006: A bas-relief of Jommeke in Temse

== Resources ==
- Danny De Laet (1981), De geesteskinderen van Jef Nys, in De avonturen van Amadeus en Seppeke! pages 171–176, Antwerpen, De Dageraad. ISBN 90-6371-121-2
