= Portrait of Feyntje Steenkiste =

Painting by Frans Hals

Portrait of Feyntje van Steenkiste
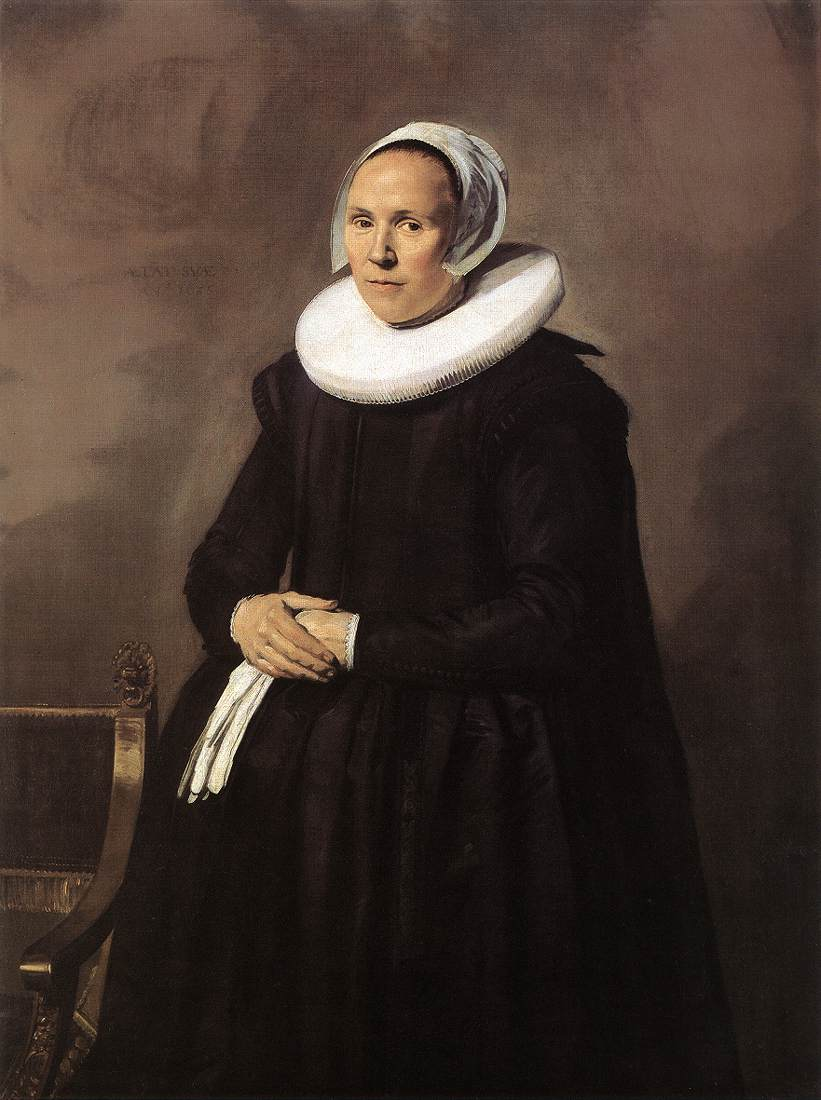
- Portrait of Feyntje van Steenkiste, wife of Lucas de Clercq, 1635, oil on canvas, 123 cm x 93 cm
- Artist: Frans Hals
- Year: 1635
- Catalogue: Hofstede de Groot, Catalog 1910: #166
- Medium: Oil on canvas
- Dimensions: 123 cm × 93 cm (48 in × 37 in)
- Location: Rijksmuseum; Amsterdam
- Accession: SK-C-557

Portrait of Feyntje van Steenkiste is an oil-on-canvas painting by the Dutch Golden Age painter Frans Hals, painted around 1635 and now in the Rijksmuseum, in Amsterdam. It is considered a pendant to the portrait of Feyntje's husband Lucas de Clercq.

== Life ==
Feyntje van Steenkiste was born in Haarlem as the daughter of a Mennonite potash merchant and became engaged to Lucas, also a Mennonite potash merchant, on 8 January 1622. Together they had three children, Janneke, Passchina, and Pieter, who joined his father in his business. Feyntje was buried 3 March 1640, and Lucas remarried Adraentje Keijser the same year on 18 September.

== Painting ==
Feyntje's portrait was painted nine years after her marriage to Lucas in 1622, aged 18. Unlike Hals' other wedding portraits of women, she is wearing a sober Mennonite dress without lace wrist collars. Her dress is however made with many buttons and edged with pleats that indicate the expense of the cut. Her millstone collar is noticeable for its extra tightly folded figure-eight loops. She wears her hair covered by a winged diadem cap that is edged with lace trim. She is not wearing any jewelry. Her ensemble is very similar to the portrait of another, unnamed sitter for Hals:

== Two Mennonite brides of Haarlem of the 1630s ==
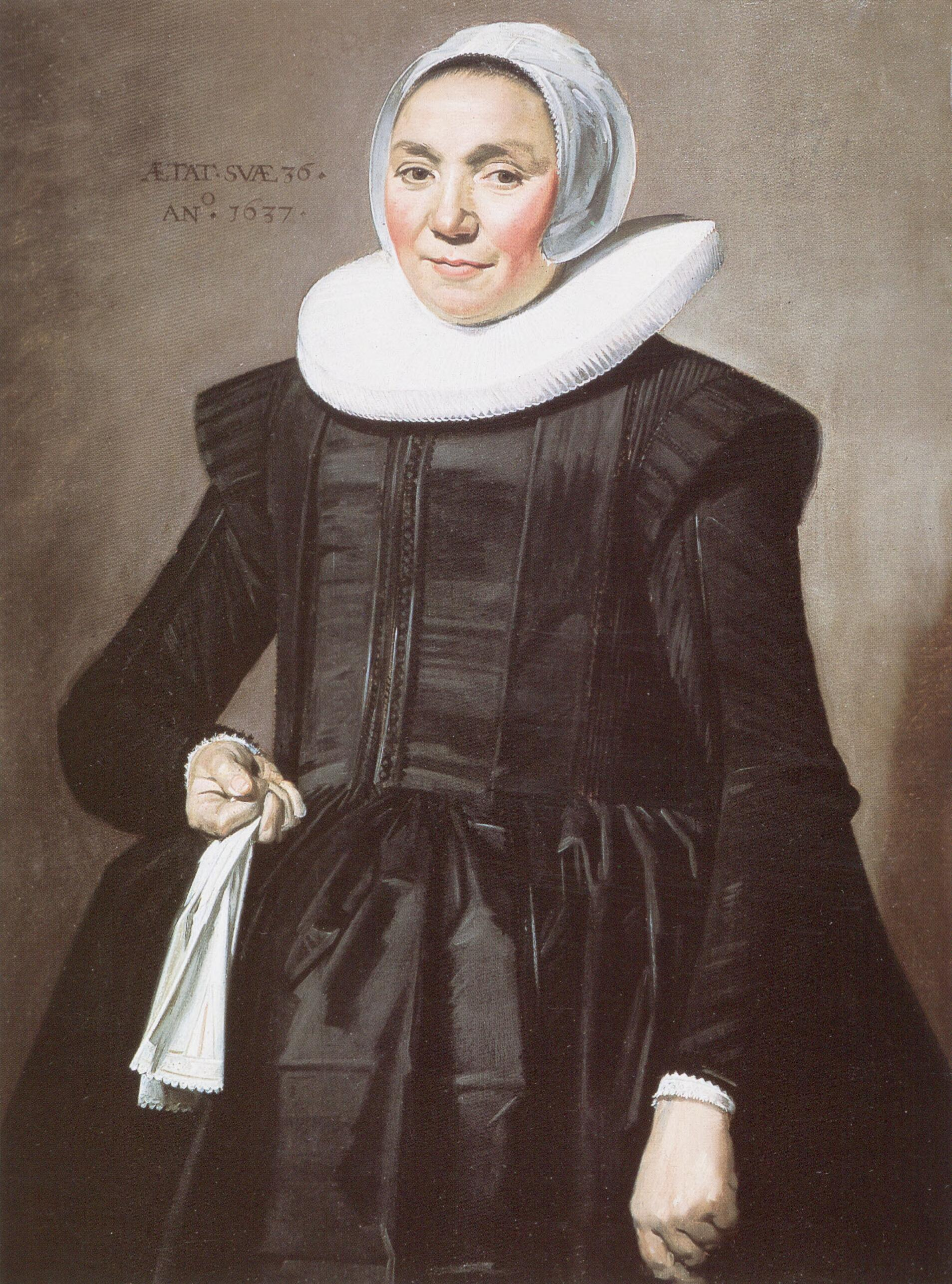

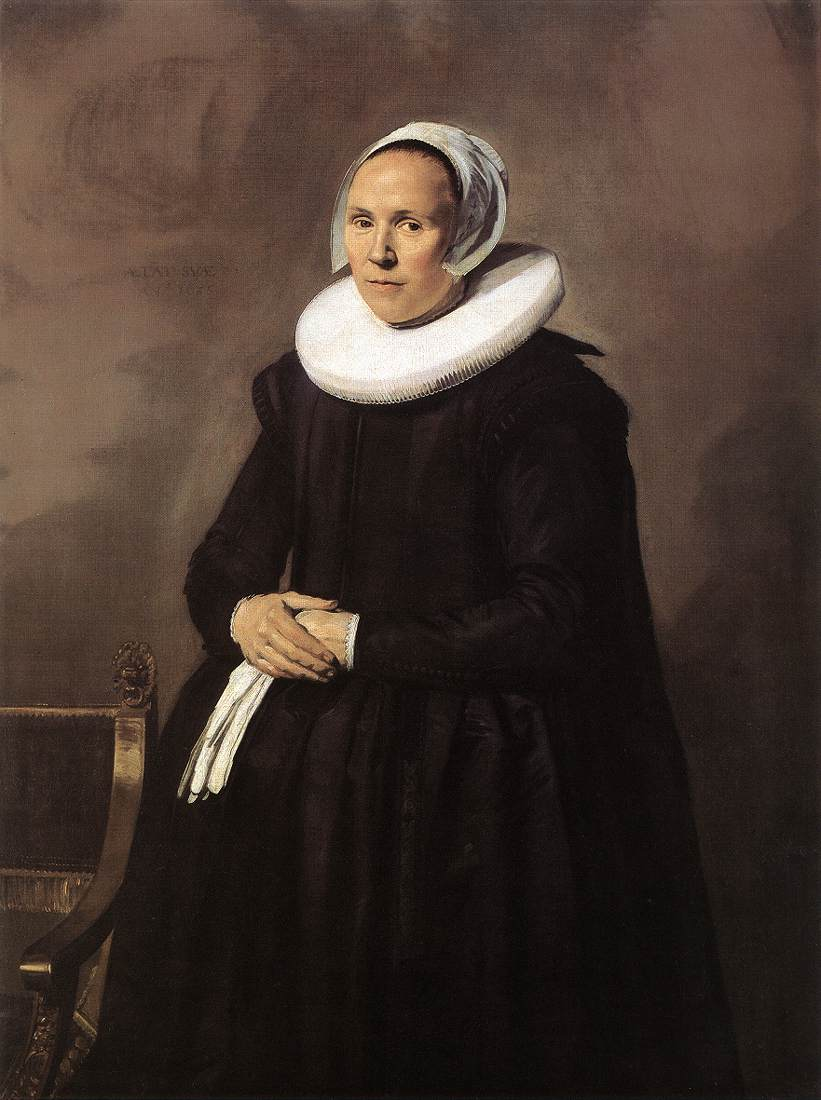

Feyntje's portrait was documented by Hofstede de Groot in 1910, who wrote:

166. FEYNTJE VAN STEENKISTE (born 1604), wife of Lucas de Clercq. M. 25. Three-quarter-length, life size. She stands almost facing the spectator but slightly inclined to the left. She looks at the spectator. At her left is a chair. Her hands, holding her gloves, are clasped in front of her. She wears a white cap, a black dress with a small white ruff, and a little lace on the sleeves. The colouring is similar to that of 165. The hands are painted with exceptional breadth and accuracy [See 165.] Inscribed on the left, " AETAT SVAE 31. ANo 1635."; canvas, 49 inches by 37 inches. See Moes, Iconographia Batava, No. 7550. Engraved by C. E. Taurel. Given by the De Clercq family to the city of Amsterdam, 1891. In the Rijksmuseum, Amsterdam, 1907 catalogue, No. 1087; exhibited on loan since 1891.

Hofstede de Groot listed it as a pendant of Lucas's portrait, and in 1974 Seymour Slive listed these as pendants and remarked on Nicolaes' unusual relaxed pose leaning over the back of a chair, and that Sara's headress was similar to that of women in the 1630s, including others by Hals.

== Wedding Pendant ==
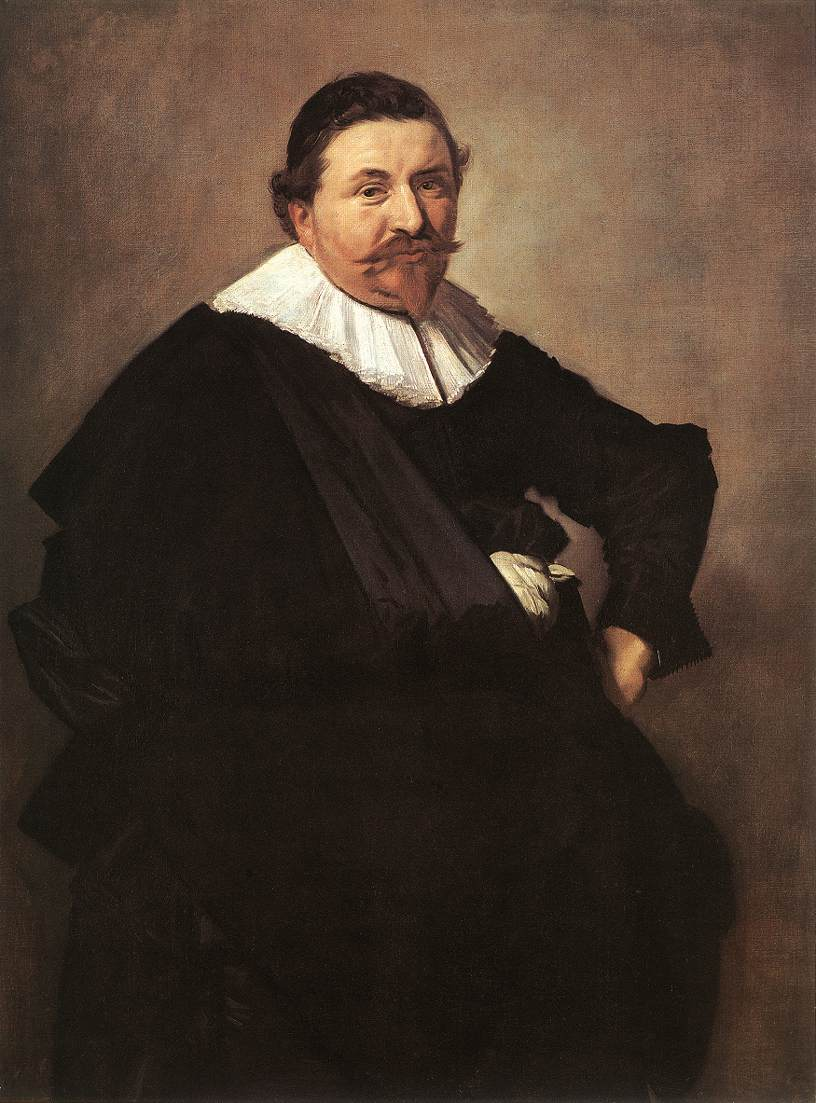

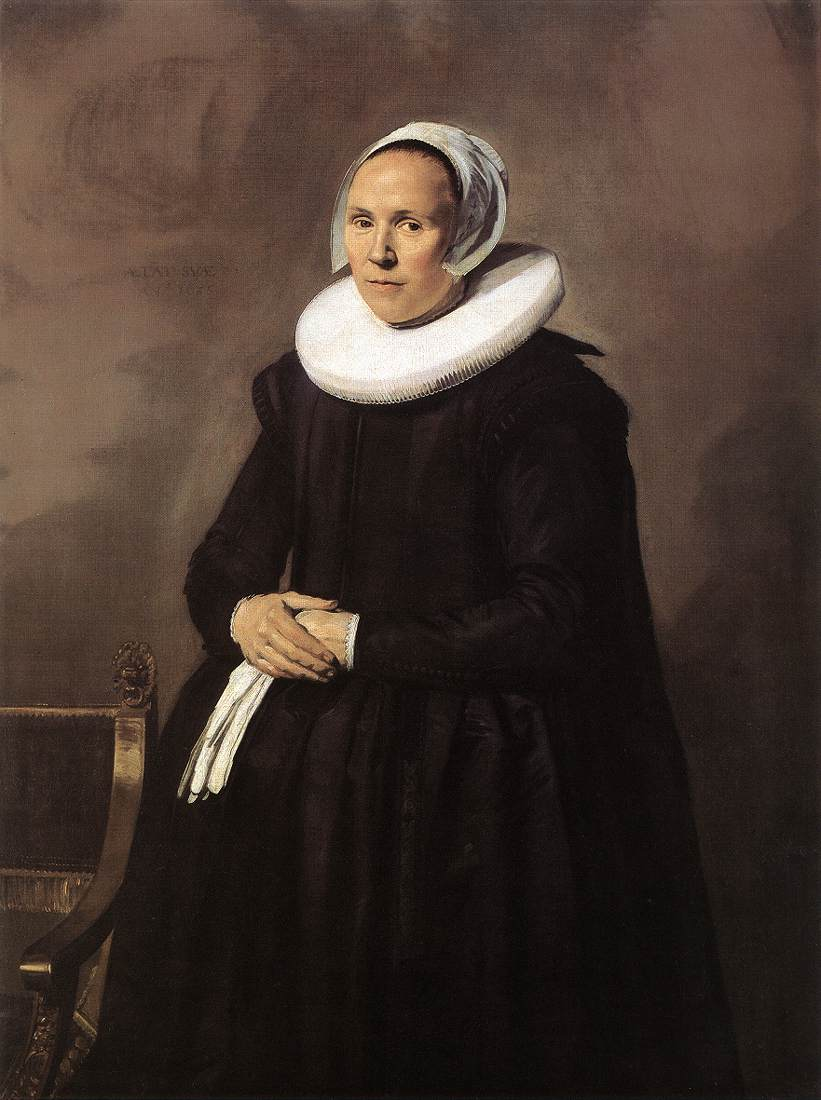

== See also ==
- List of paintings by Frans Hals
