= Het Volk (newspaper) =

Belgian Catholic newspaper

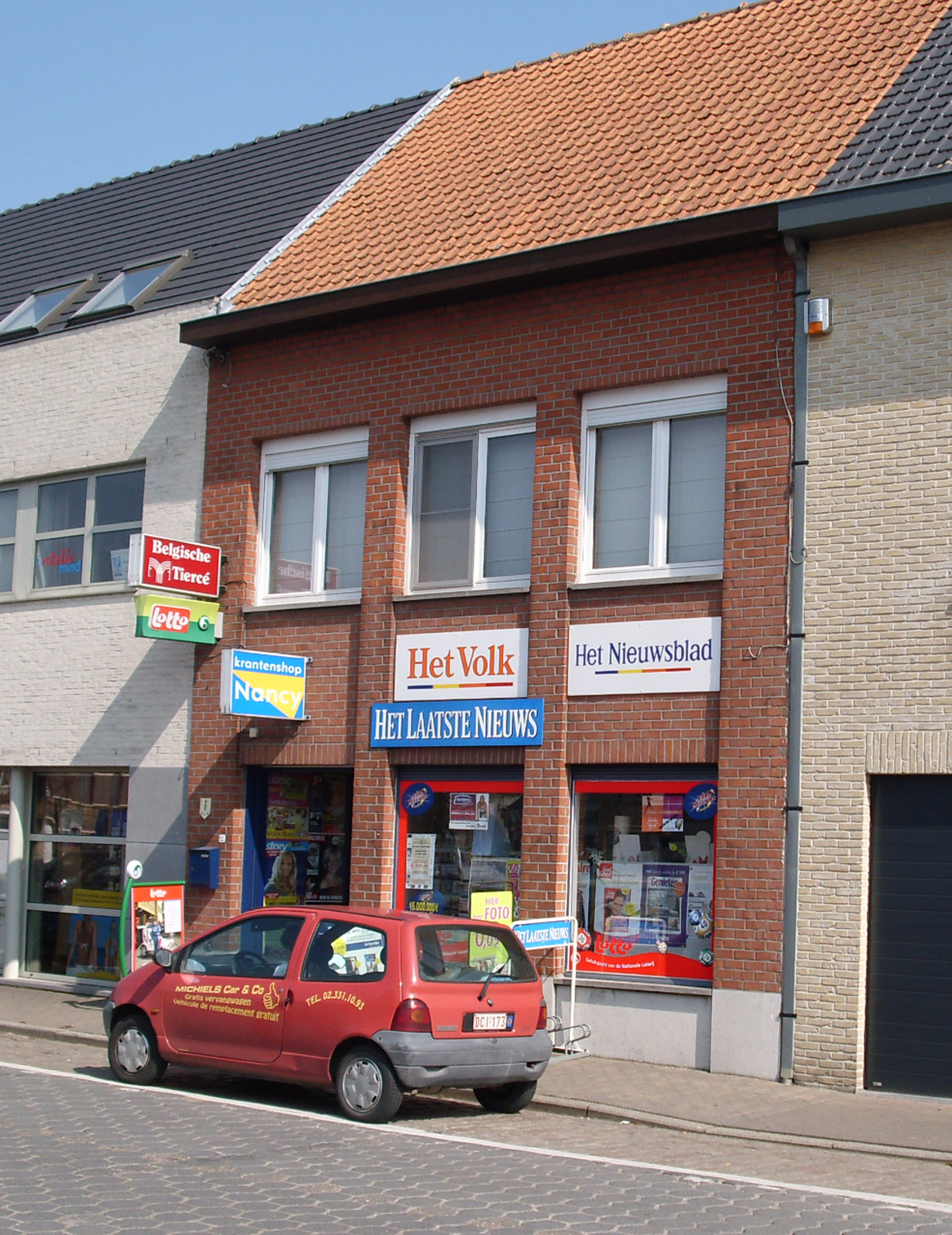
- Het Volk advertised by a newsagent in East Flanders
- Type: Daily newspaper
- Format: Tabloid
- Owner: Mediahuis
- Editor: Frank Buyse
- Founded: 1891
- Ceased publication: 10 May 2008
- Language: Dutch
- Headquarters: Gossetlaan 30; Groot-Bijgaarden (Dilbeek) B-1702
- Sister newspapers: Het Nieuwsblad, De Gentenaar
- Website: www.hetvolk.be

Het Volk (English: The People) was a Belgian newspaper that focused on "news with a human undertone".

== History ==
Het Volk was first published in 1891. It was the only paper controlled by the Christian labour organizations in Ghent. It opposed socialism. It adopted "anti-socialist daily" as its slogan. The paper was distributed in Ghent, Aalst and Brussels. In 1912, the slogan was changed to "Christian labourer's daily".

In 1925, Het Volk was the first newspaper in Belgium to publish a small Sunday issue, "Het Zondagsblad" ("The Sunday Paper"). In 1930 it adopted the subtitle "Catholic Democratic Newspaper of Flanders". During the Second World War, Het Volk sold 35,000 a day. It gained international attention in 1944 when it was the first – and for a time, the only – paper to report the Von Rundstedt Offensive in the Ardennes. After the war, Het Volk started organizing sports events. In 1945, the first Omloop Het Volk cycling race was held. In 1952, Het Volk purchased De Nieuwe Gids, a Brussels newspaper. De Nieuwe Gids has disappeared. Their other "cover-paper" De Gentenaar existed.

In 1994, Het Volk was purchased by the Vlaamse Uitgeversmaatschappij. Then the paper became part of Corelio. Since 2001, differences between Het Volk, Het Nieuwsblad and De Gentenaar was small and restricted to the front page. In 2000, Het Volk left Ghent and moved to Groot-Bijgaarden, near Brussels.

Het Volk ceased publication on 10 May 2008 when it merged with its sister newspaper Het Nieuwsblad.

== Youth supplements ==
Het Volkske (English: The Small 'Het Volk'/The Small People) was the weekly children's supplement of the Flemish newspaper Het Volk. The supplement appeared every Wednesday as this was the day schools in Flanders closed at noon (as opposed to 4 p.m. on Mondays, Tuesdays, Wednesdays and Fridays). Next to a letters page and a series of articles on music, movies and other subjects that might interest schoolchildren, the supplement also had a special children's news section where current events were explained in simple language.

=== 't Kapoentje ===
From April 3, 1947 until 1989, the newspaper published a weekly youth supplement named 't Kapoentje (literally: "The Little Rascal"). It was notable for its comics and, together with Ons Volkske, the most important comic book magazine originally created in Flanders.

't Kapoentje was created when the newspapers De Gids and De Standaard contested one another over copyright issues. The titles of the magazines Ons Volk Ontwaakt and Ons Volkske which were published by the newspaper De Nieuwe Standaard (n.v. De Gids) were claimed back by De Standaard in 1947. As a result, Ons Volk Ontwaakt was discontinued and changed to a new name, Overal, while the series which appeared in Ons Volkske were republished in 't Kapoentje. From October 11, 1951 on 't Kapoentje became a free supplement of Het Volk.

't Kapoentje published many comics by Marc Sleen, Willy Vandersteen, Bob De Moor, Eugeen Hermans (aka "Pink"), Rik Clément, Buth, Jef Nys, Karel Boumans, Marcel Steurbaut and the Dutch series Dokie Durf by Piet van Elk. In later years Hurey, Karel Boumans, Marcel Steurbaut, Arle (pseudonym of Berck and Leo Loedts), Frank Sels, Gilbert Declercq, Jeff Broeckx, Albert van Beek, Henk Kabos, Henk Sprenger, Piet Wijn, Ton Beek, Gerrit Stapel, Dick Vlottes, Raymond Bär van Hemmersweil, Jan van Reek, Peter de Smet also had their comics published. During its heyday Sleen's Piet Fluwijn en Bolleke and Vandersteen's De Vrolijke Bengels were the most popular comics. In 1947 Vandersteen left to join De Standaard. Bob De Moor continued De Vrolijke Bengels until 1950, when Sleen took over the series and renamed it De Lustige Kapoentjes, who quickly became the magazine's mascots.

Sleen, Rik Clément and Michel Casteels were the magazine's editors for many years. In 1965 Sleen quit and joined De Standaard. By 1989 the magazine was disestablished.

== Circulation ==
In 1980 its weekday circulation was 220,000. The paper's circulation in 2002 was 112,301 copies. Next year the circulation of the paper fell to 88,000 copies. Its circulation was 83,000 copies in 2004.

In 2006 Het Volk had an average weekday circulation of 77,000 copies, according to the Centrum voor Informatie over de Media. The circulation of the paper was 78,000 copies in 2007.

Het Volk had an average market share of 11.5% in Flanders. It was 8.9% in 2002.
