= De Clerck =

Origin
- Language: Dutch
- Meaning: clerk, scribe

De Clerck is a Dutch surname, particularly common in Flanders. In the province of West Flanders, the name is usually concatenated to Declerck. People with the surname include:

- Albert De Clerck (1914–1974), Belgian politician and government minister
- Carl Alexander Clerck (1709–1765), Swedish entomologist and arachnologist
- Hendrik de Clerck (c. 1560 – 1630), Flemish painter
- Jacques de Clerck (c. 1582 – 1624), Antwerp-born Dutch merchant, admiral, and explorer
- Jeanne Albertine Colin-De Clerck (born 1924), Belgian composer
- Marc De Clerck (born 1949), Belgian football goalkeeper
- Olivier De Clerck (born 1971), phycologist with the standard author abbreviation "De Clerck"
- Richard Declerck (1899–1986), Belgian lawyer and politician
- Roger De Clerck (1924–2015), Belgian entrepreneur
- Stefaan Maria Joris Yolanda De Clerck (born 1951), Belgian politician
