= Arnaud Leclercq =

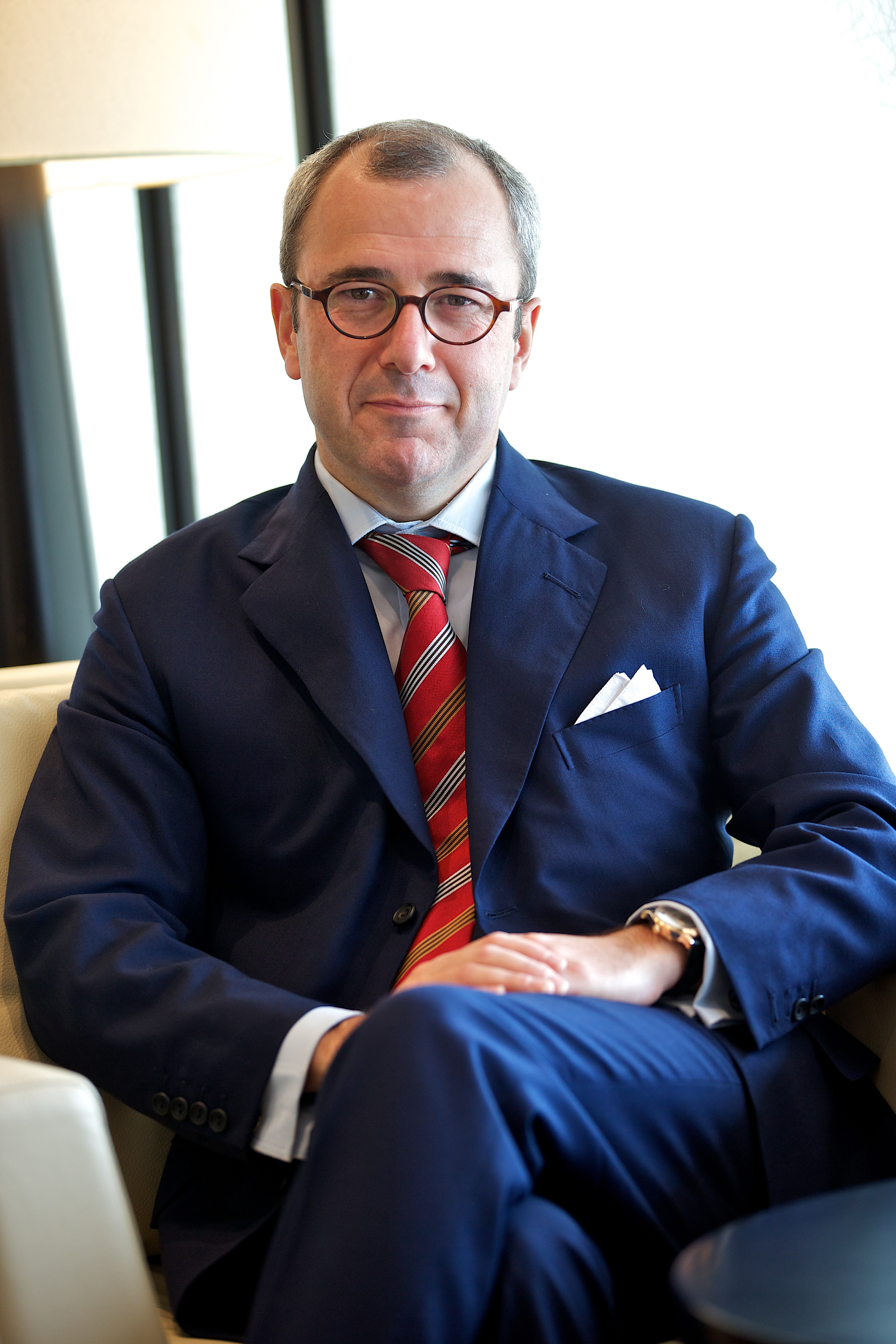
Arnaud Leclercq

Arnaud Leclercq (born March 16, 1967) is a Swiss author and banker, a limited partner and member of the executive board of Bank Lombard Odier & Co private bank. He is recognized in the finance industry as an expert in private wealth management in Russian markets.

== Author ==
Leclercq published La Russie, puissance d’Eurasie, Histoire géopolitique des origines à Poutine in November 2012 titled (Russian power in Eurasia, a geopolitical history from origins to Putin). This book underwent excellent reviews in French-specialized magazines and was later published in the Russian language in 2014.

In June 2014, Thomas Flichy de la Neuville, professor at the École spéciale militaire de Saint-Cyr, brought together thirteen experts, including Arnaud Leclercq, to deliver a first analysis on the eminently complex issue of the Ukrainian crisis in his book ‘Ukraine, regards sur la crise’ (Ukraine, view of the crisis).

Leclercq is the author of a number of articles published in notable newspapers and magazines in Switzerland (Le Temps), France (Nouvelle Revue de Géopolitique and Conflits), Russia (RBK Daily) and Middle-East (Arabian Business) and has been interviewed on television RTS (Switzerland), Russia 24, RT TV and on radio station Voice of Russia.

== Education and career ==
Leclercq completed his secondary education at College Stanislas in Paris. After graduation, he completed a degree in law at Paris 2 Panthéon-Assas University. He majored in corporate law & tax and completed a second education in comparative law.

In 1994, Leclercq returned to France to complete his MBA at HEC Paris. He then joined the construction conglomerate Bouygues International, where he spent five years.

In 2000, he joined Credit Suisse where he became the global head of Eastern Europe and one of its most senior 20 Managing Directors.

In 2002, Leclercq completed studies in an executive finance program at Stanford University and was selected by Credit Suisse (2004) to attend Harvard Business School (alumni) within the General Manager Program.

Leclercq joined Lombard Odier on July 1, 2006, and became a limited partner of Lombard. Since then, he has become a member of the executive committee of the private bank and the group managing director responsible for the private clients' business in new markets.

== Awards ==
In 2007, Leclercq was recognized as "Outstanding Young Private Banker – Europe" at the Private Banker International Awards held that year in Singapore.

== Personal life ==
In 2012 Leclercq obtained his PhD summa cum laude from Paris I Sorbonne University. He occasionally spoke at international conferences, including Ecole des hautes études internationales et politiques (Paris), Russian Economic Forum, the Academy of the Russian Ministry of Foreign Affairs (Moscow), University of Krasnoyarsk, Private Banking World Middle East (Dubai), European banking and financial forum (Prague), Shorex Wealth Management Forum (Moscow, Geneva), Dubai Business Women Council, IDL de Kereden (Locarn Institute), etc.
