= Het Nieuwsblad =

Flemish daily newspaper

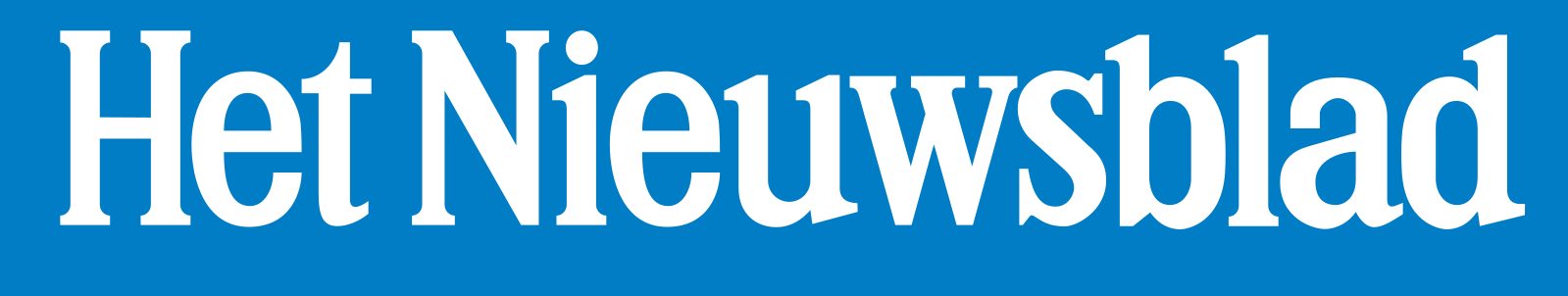

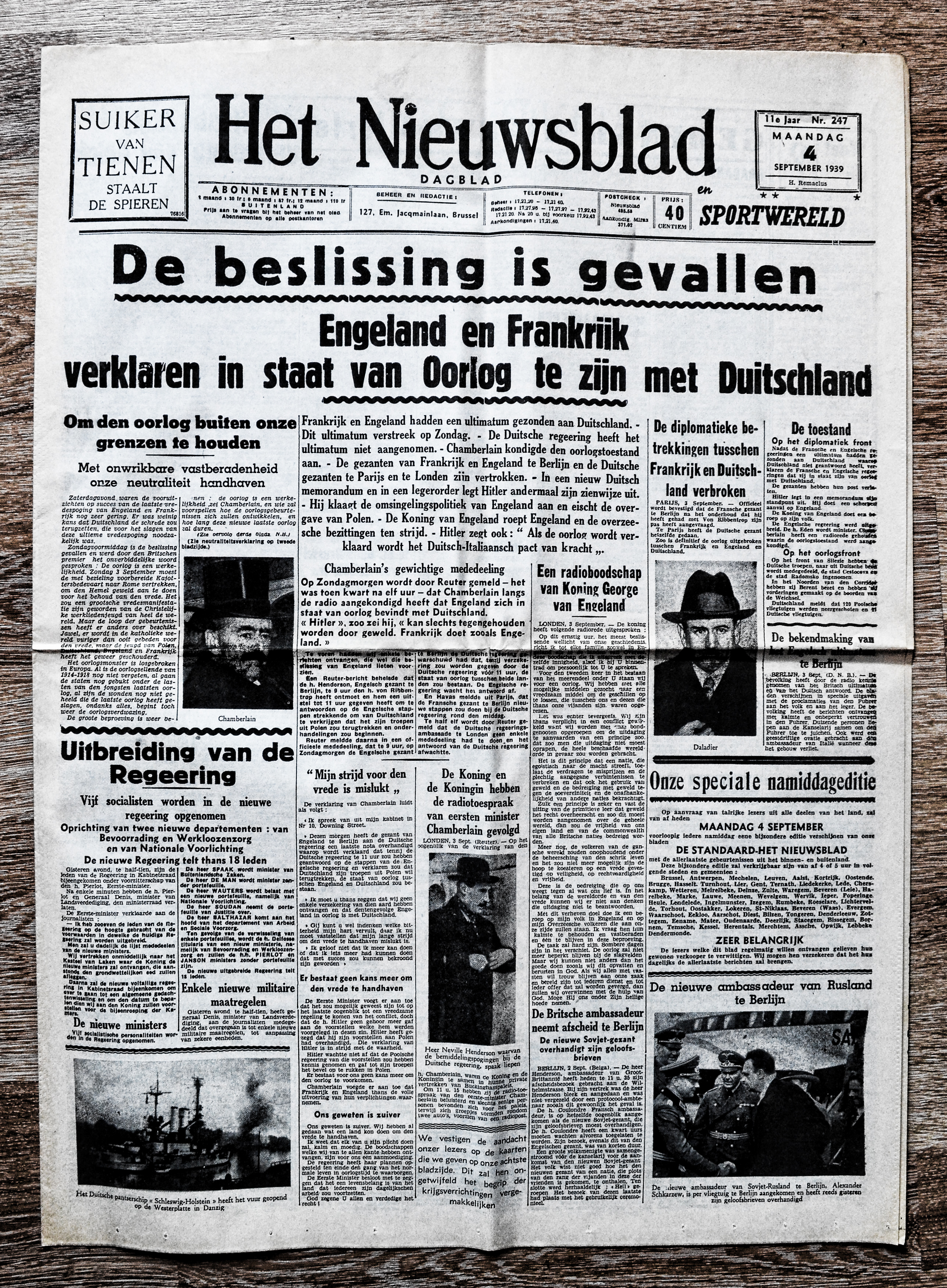
- Front page of Het Nieuwsblad from September 4, 1939, with the headline "The decision has been made, England and France declare to be at war with Germany".
- Type: Daily newspaper
- Format: Tabloid
- Owner: Mediahuis
- Editor: Guy Fransen
- Founded: 3 November 1929; 96 years ago
- Language: Dutch
- Headquarters: Gossetlaan 30; Groot-Bijgaarden B-1702
- Website: nieuwsblad.be

Het Nieuwsblad (Dutch pronunciation: [ət ˈniβ̞zblɑt]; English: The Newspaper) is a Flemish newspaper that mainly focuses on "a broad view" regarding politics, culture, economics, lifestyle, society and sports.

== History and profile ==
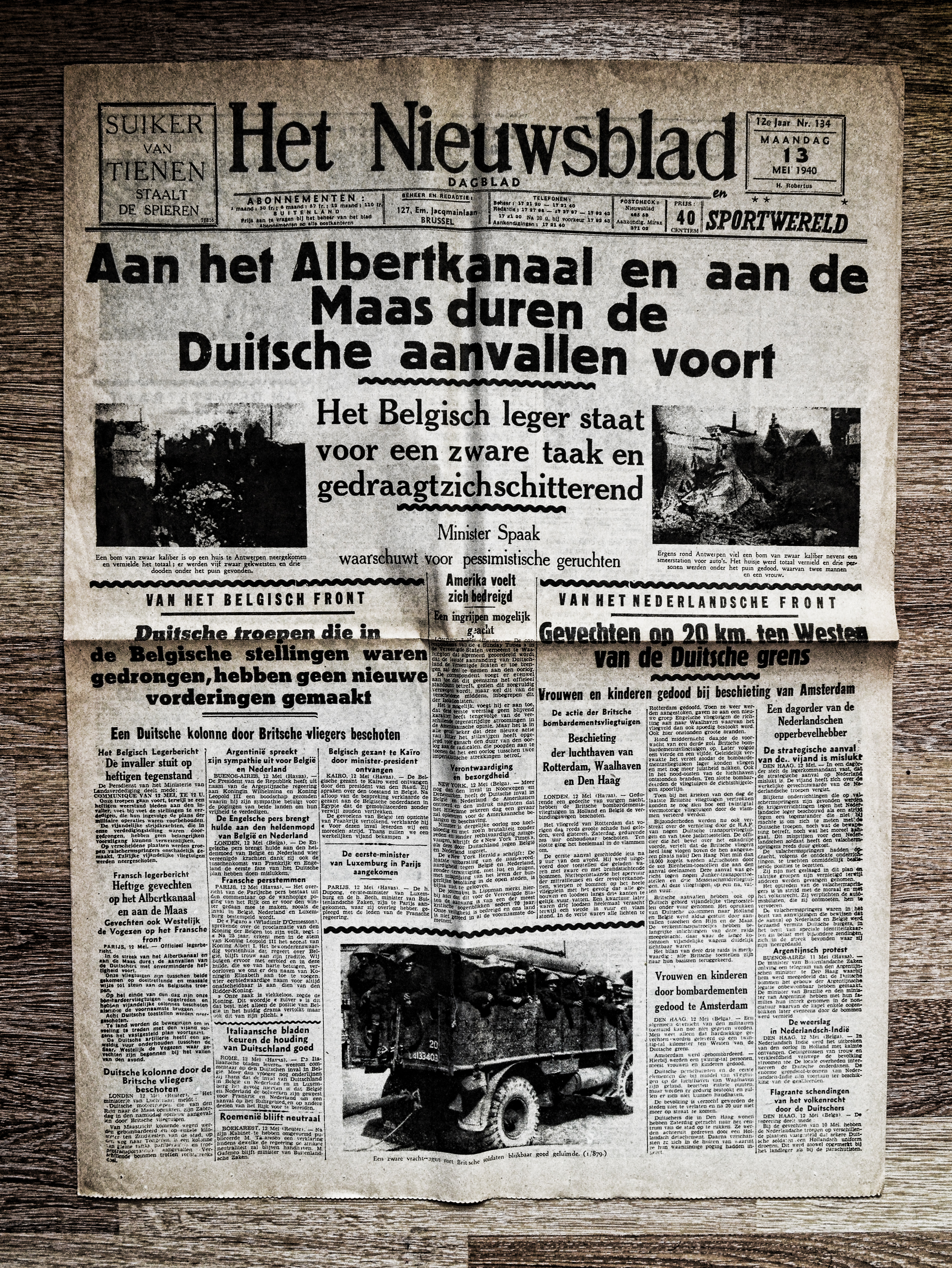
Front page from May 13, 1940, with the headline "The German attacks continue on the Albert Canal and on the Maas".

In 1929, Het Nieuwsblad was published by De Standaard for the first time. In 1939, the sports paper Sportwereld (established in 1912) was purchased by De Standaard and turned into a daily supplement to their two main newspapers, "De Standaard" and "Het Nieuwsblad".

In 1957, three other newspapers were purchased by De Standaard and initially kept in circulation. In 1966, the further publication of two of them, Het Nieuws van de Dag and Het Vrije Volksblad, was stopped. The same happened with the third paper, Het Handelsblad, in 1979.

In 1959, two more newspapers were purchased, of which De Landwacht disappeared in 1978. The other paper, De Gentenaar, was turned into a "cover-paper" for Het Nieuwsblad around the city of Ghent. De Gentenaar still exists today and contains the same articles and columns as Het Nieuwsblad plus local news from the Ghent area.

In 1962, a special supplement for children was created, the Patskrant. In 1977, the name was changed into the Stripkrant. In 2000, the daily Stripkrant was replaced by the Jommekeskrant (on Wednesday) and by Yo (on Mondays, Tuesday, Thursday, Friday and Saturday).

In 1976, De Standaard went bankrupt before their newspapers were purchased by the Vlaamse Uitgeversmaatschappij.

In 1996, Het Nieuwsblad started a new "cover-paper" in Antwerp, named Het Stad. This paper was never successful and disappeared after just two years.

In 2003, Het Nieuwsblad and Het Volk jointly started the publication of the lifestyle-magazine Catchy. In the same year Het Nieuwsblad began publishing on Sundays after nearly 75 years of publication and the newspaper also created the cycling award Flandrien of the Year.

On 10 May 2008, Het Nieuwsblad and Het Volk merged.

As of February 2010, the Het Nieuwsblad website, nieuwsblad.be had an average daily unique visitor count of 332,000, making it the most popular newspaper website in Flanders. The website, just like the paper edition, is characterised as populist, rather right wing, with a focus on local news, celebrity news and sensational articles.

== Circulation ==
The circulation of Het Nieuwsblad in 2002 was 241,120 copies. The following year, it had a circulation of 211,000 copies, making it the second best selling Belgian newspaper. In 2006, the paper had an average weekday circulation of 210,000 issues, according to the Centrum voor Informatie over de Media.

In 2009 Het Nieuwsblad had an average market share of 27.04% in Flanders and had a circulation of 263,063 copies. In 2011 the circulation was up to 300,000 copies. The latest available certified figure, from 2015, lists print output at 264 891 copies per day.
