= Philippe Leclerc (footballer) =

French footballer (born 1969)

Personal information
- Full name: Philippe Leclerc
- Date of birth: 7 August 1969 (age 57)
- Place of birth: Amiens, France
- Height: 1.77 m (5 ft 9 1/2 in)
- Position: Midfielder

Youth career
- 1978–1980: Nancy
- 1980–1985: Nantes
- 1985–1987: Nancy

Senior career*
Years	Team	Apps	(Gls)
1987–1990	Chamois Niortais	2	(0)
1990–1993	Poitiers	?	(?)
- * Club domestic league appearances and goals

Philippe Leclerc (born 7 August 1969) is a former professional footballer who played as a central defender. He played two matches for Chamois Niortais in Ligue 2 in the 1989–90 season.

Leclerc began his career as a junior with Nancy, switching to Nantes in 1980 before returning to Nancy in 1985. He joined Chamois Niortais in 1987, but played just twice before leaving to join Poitiers in 1990.

He is currently the sporting director of Poitiers.
