= Charles Leclerc (disambiguation) =

Charles Leclerc (born 1997) is a Monégasque racing driver.

Charles Leclerc may also refer to:

- Charles-Antoine Leclerc de La Bruère (1716–1754), French historian and diplomat
- Charles Leclerc de Landremont (1739–1818), French general
- Charles Leclerc (general, born 1772) (1772–1802), French general
