= Jeanne Colin-De Clerck =

Belgian composer

Jeanne (Albertine) Colin-De Clerck (born 9 January 1924) is a Belgian composer who also uses the names Jeanne Colin and Albertine De Clerck. She was born in Brussels, Belgium, and studied at Royal Conservatory of Music in Brussels. During her time at the Brussels Royal Conservatory of Music she won first prize for solfeggio (1942) and a "mention for piano accompaniment". After completing her education, she began to compose without formal instruction. Four years later, she took a position teaching at the Music Academy in Anderlecht, and taught as a professor of solfeggio at the Academy of Music Anderlecht from 1946 to 1977. Her works included pieces for orchestra, chamber, piano and voice. Her style is described as atonal. She married composer Georges Colin (1921–2002), and together they had two sons and two daughters. Throughout her compositional career she also collaborated with her husband on pieces.

== Works ==
Colin-De Clerck composes vocal, chamber and electronic music. Selected work include:

- Matière habitée op.9, for orchestra (1968)
- String Quartet (1968)
- Caprice, violin & piano (1970)
- Divertissement op.13, for string orchestra (1970)
- Concerto for flute and orchestra (1972)
- Concerto for violin & orchestra (1974)
- Concertati Movimenti violin & piano (1975)
- Fantaisie for Saxophone (1977)
- Saxophone quartet Op. 28 (1977)
- Petit concert à 7 Op. 31 for piano and 6 percussionists
- Deuxième et Troisième Humoresques (CeBeDeM) 10p.

"Contemporary, idiomatic. Lento, with many tempo changes; clusters, repeated tones, contrasting registers, textures, dynamics, and motives. Adv."

- Leitmotiv Op.29 (CeBeDeM 1979) 16p.

"Contemporary, idiomatic. Lento, with many tempo changes; clusters, repeated tones, contrasting registers, textures, dynamics, and motives. Adv."

- Première Humoresque (CeBeDeM 1991)

"Proportional rhythms, tempo changes; 12-tone writing, 2-vc ctpt with occasional double-note chords; some imitation, mirror writing. Early Adv."

- Rythmes Op. 34/1-2 (CeBeDeM 1985)

"6/8, playful rhythms, tritones, imitative, double 8vas, sectional textures. Giocoso (4',9p): scherzo in 2/4, LH staccato 7th chords, 8vas, playful 16th-note runs; syncopated figures in RH. Early Adv."

- Various pieces (names unknown) for chamber music including a flute solo, violin solo, strings, and mixed choir.

Pieces written in collaboration with Georges Colin:

- Le Tombeau d'André Jolivet 2 pianos (1975)
- Short Pieces for Harps (1976)
- Flutes Quartet (1976)
- Two pieces for Flute & Harp (1979)
- Ji soprano solo, Mixed choir & orchestra (1986)
