= Leclair =

Le Claire, LeClair, LeClaire or Leclair is a French or Francophone surname which can refer to:

- Antoine Le Claire (1797–1861), U.S. Army interpreter, founded Davenport, Iowa
- Corinne Leclair (born 1970), Mauritian swimmer
- Day Leclaire, American author
- Denise LeClair Cobb, American former CNN Headline News anchor
- Didier Leclair (born 1967), Canadian francophone fiction writer
- Frank J. LeClair (1888-1974), American commercial fisherman and politician
- Jean-Marie Leclair, also known as Jean-Marie Leclair the Elder, (1697–1764), French Baroque violinist and composer
- Jean-Marie Leclair the younger (1703–1777), French composer, the younger brother of the better-known Jean-Marie Leclair the Elder
- Harold LeClair Ickes (1874–1952), U.S. administrator and political figure and former Secretary of the Interior (1933 to 1946)
- Jack LeClair (1929–2011), Canadian former ice hockey player
- Jim LeClair (1950–2019), American football player
- John LeClair (born 1969), American former professional ice hockey player
- Judith LeClair (born 1958), American bassoonist
- Keith LeClair, American college baseball coach
- Maurice LeClair (1927–2020) Canadian physician, businessman, civil servant, and academic
- Pierre-Julien Leclair (1860– after 1896), Canadian politician
- Edme-Jean Leclaire (1801–1872), French economist and businessman
- Pascal Leclaire (born 1982), Canadian ice hockey player

== Places ==
- LeClaire, Iowa, United States, a city
- LeClaire Park, Davenport, Iowa, a park

== Buildings ==
- LeClaire Apartments, listed on the National Register of Historic Places in Florida
- LeClaire Hotel, listed on the National Register of Historic Places in Illinois

== See also ==
- LeClerc (surname)
