= Veronica de Klerk =

Namibian activist

Veronica Cecilia de Klerk
- Born: 26 November 1947 (age 78); Kimberley, South Africa
- Occupation: Former executive director
- Organization: Women's Action for Development (WAD)

Veronica Cecilia de Klerk (born 26 November 1947) is a Namibian women's rights activist.

== Early life and work ==
De Klerk grew up in Windhoek, the island territory of St. Helena, and in South Africa. She was a television personality during the 1980s on the South West African Broadcasting Corporation prior to independence in 1990.

== Career ==
She established "Community Voice" programmes in all regions of Namibia through WAD; these activists assist in identifying and solving their social challenges in partnership with decision-makers in the regions. Alcohol abuse was found to be the main cause of violence against women, among many other causes.

9,000 community members; decision-makers and community leaders were trained in the contents of gender-related laws, including the Combating of the Domestic. Violence Law; the Combating of the Rape Law; the Child Maintenance Law; and the Married Persons' Equality Law, for women and men to know their rights within those laws.

During 2014 President Dr. Hifikepunye Pohamba appointed Veronica De Klerk as one of 18 commissioners to serve on the National Planning Commission, to assist in addressing poverty, unemployment, the lack of skills among poor communities, as well as the evils of Gender Based Violence; Alcohol and Drug abuse, Teenage Pregnancies, etc.

During 2012, 2013, and 2014, under her leadership, the "Professional Management Review" (PMR), based in South Africa, presented WAD with one Gold Award and 2 Diamond Awards respectively, for excellent leadership and achievements.
