= Eugène Leclercq =

French draughts player

Eugène Leclercq

Eugène Leclercq (1832–1908) was Draughts World Championship from 1895 to 1899. At that time the championship was an international tournament held in France. He also wrote about the game.
