= Clerk (2021 film) =

- Promotional release poster
- Directed by: Malcolm Ingram
- Produced by: Craig Fleming; Malcolm Ingram
- Starring: Kevin Smith
- Cinematography: Bruce Lee Roberts III
- Edited by: Sean Stanley
- Music by: Martin Rae
- Distributed by: 1091 Pictures
- Release date: November 23, 2021
- Running time: 115 minutes
- Country: United States
- Language: English

Clerk is a 2021 documentary film about the life and career of filmmaker Kevin Smith. It was directed by Smith's protégé and collaborator Malcolm Ingram.

== Release ==
The documentary premiered in March 2021 at South by Southwest. 1091 Pictures acquired the rights to the film in August.

It was screened at the Count Basie Center for the Arts on November 4. It had a digital release on November 23, 2021.

== Synopsis ==
The film documents the life and career of Kevin Smith, a filmmaker who broke into the industry with the low-budget comedy Clerks. It features interviews with various actors, directors, and other figures who have associated with Smith during his career, including Matt Damon, Richard Linklater, Jason Reitman, Jason Mewes, and the late Stan Lee.

== Reception ==
On the review aggregator website Rotten Tomatoes, 82% of 34 critics' reviews are positive. Metacritic, which uses a weighted average, assigned the film a score of 51 out of 100, based on five critics, indicating "mixed or average" reviews.
