= Julien Leclercq =

Julien Leclercq may refer to:

- Julien Leclercq (poet) (1865–1901), French poet
- Julien Leclercq (director) (born 1979), French film director
- Julien Leclercq (snooker player) (born 2003), Belgian snooker player
