= Jean-Christophe De Clercq =

French artist

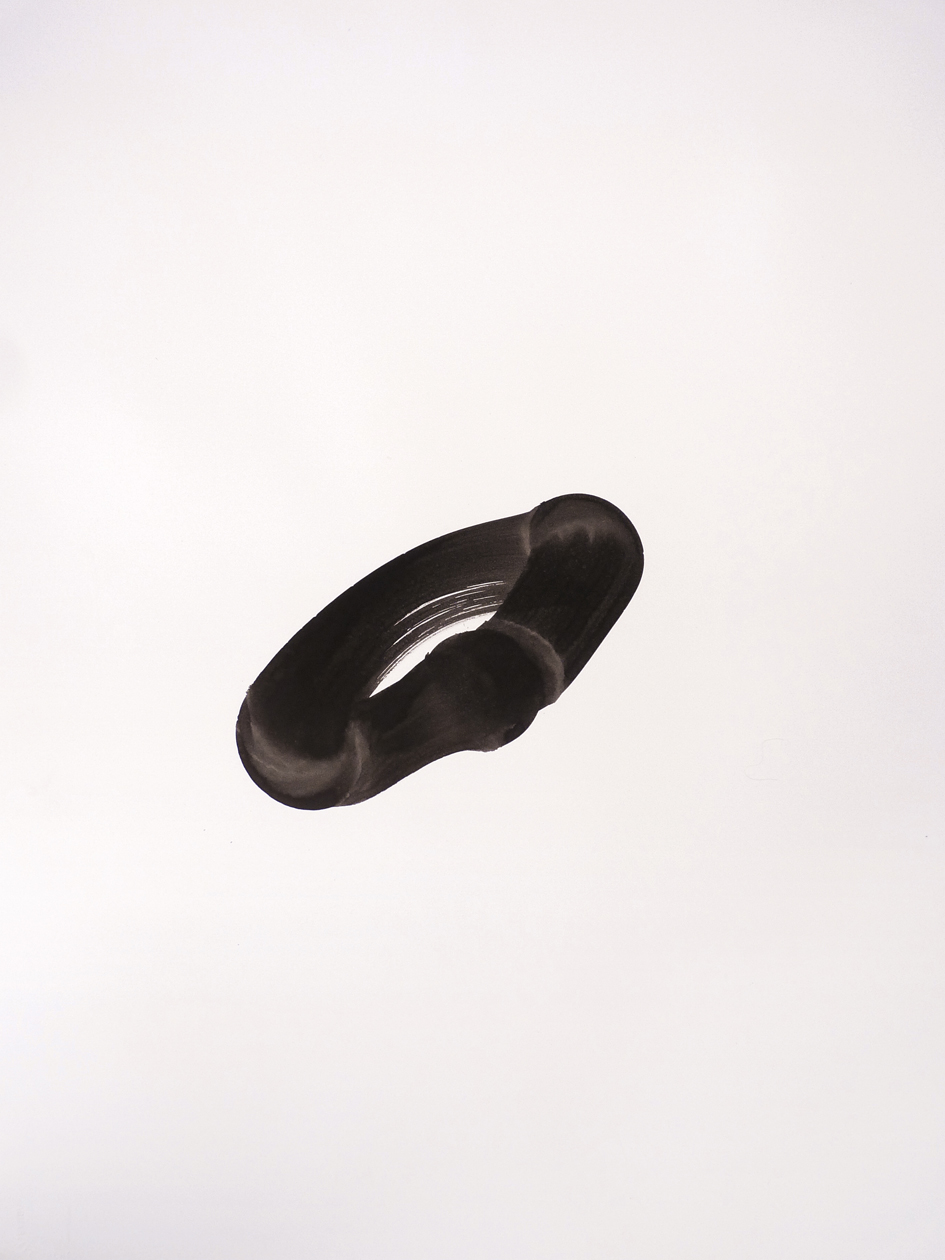
Jean-Christophe De Clercq's painting

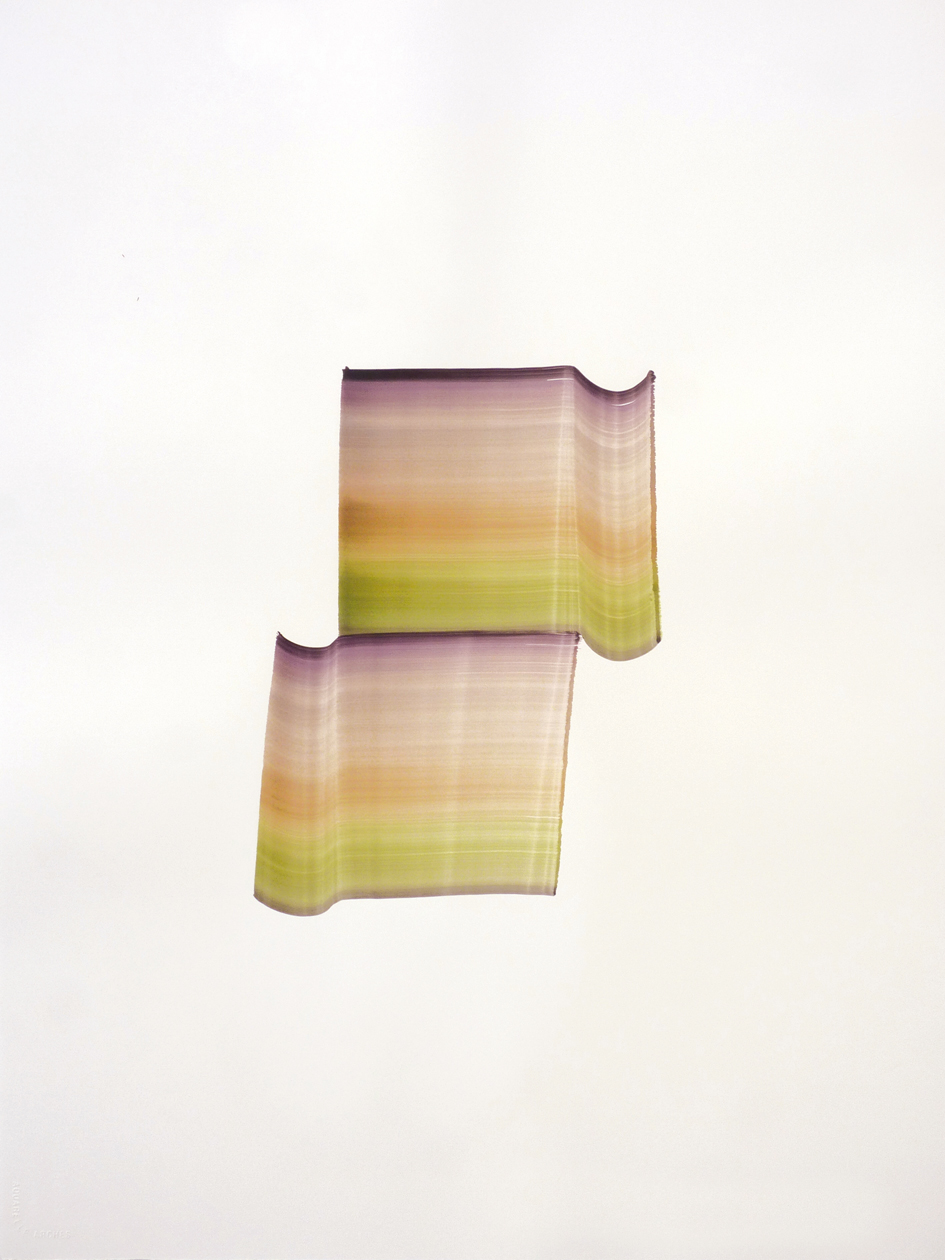
Jean-Christophe De Clercq's painting

Jean-Christophe De Clercq (born in 1966 in Issy-les-Moulineaux) is a French artist who lives and works in Champeix, Auvergne.

== Painting ==
"To produce the maximum of effects with a minimum of means", such is the definition of the painting of Jean-Christophe De Clercq according to the art critic Jacques Henric.

== Solo exhibitions ==
- 1988 : Centre culturel Das Haus, Rorschach, Switzerland
- 1990 : Galerie Windeg, Herisau, Switzerland
- 2001 : Galerie Garde à vue, Clermont-Ferrand, France
- 2001 : Galerie Lazertis, Zurich, Switzerland
- 2005 : Galerie 14, Paris, France
- 2005 : Galerie Arkos, Clermont-Ferrand, France
- 2006 : Galerie Africana, Zurich, Switzerland
- 2006 : Galerie Lazertis, Zurich, Switzerland
- 2007 : Galerie Arkos, Clermont-Ferrand, France
- 2008 : Établissement thermal du Mont-Dore - Route des villes d'eaux du massif central, France
- 2009 : Paul Smith, Paris, France
- 2011 : Salles Jean-Hélion, Centre culturel Nicolas-Pomel, Issoire, France
- 2014 : Galerie Arigang. Maison de la Corée, Clermont-Ferrand.
- 2015 : Lycée René-Descartes, Cournon.
- 2016 : Galerie Louis Gendre, Chamalières.
- 2018 : Domaine Royal de Randan, FRAC Auvergne.
- 2020-21 : Exposition “Les figures numériques de Jean‐Christophe De Clercq”, Galerie Louis Gendre, Chamalières.

== Collective exhibitions ==
- 2002 : FRAC Auvergne, Territoires inoccupés. Clermont-Ferrand.
- 2003 : Les mars de l’art contemporain, Saint-Saturnin.
- 2003 : Galerie Garde à Vue, Autour d’un rouge. Clermont-Ferrand.
- 2004 : Graphes et Partition, site expérimental des pratiques artistiques, Rennes. Avec la collaboration du FRAC (Bretagne)
- 2006 : Galerie 14, Paris.
- 2006 : Galerie Arkos, Tous ensemble. Clermont-Ferrand
- 2008 : Galerie L.J. Beaubourg, Paris.
- 2012 : Verein Für Originalgraphik, Zurich.
- 2012 : Sangallensia IV- Christian Roellin Gallery, St. Gallen
- 2013 : FRAC Auvergne (2 février- 12 mai). Clermont-Fd.
- 2015 : Recto Verso. Fondation Louis Vuitton.
- 2015 : Les Tours de lumière, Saint-Saturnin.
- 2015 : Sangallensia VI- Christian Roellin Gallery, Saint-Gall.
- 2015 : Un dessein de dessins. FRAC Auvergne.
- 2016 : A quoi tient la beauté des étreintes, FRAC Auvergne.
- 2017 : Matières d'Art, Jardins du château d'Hauterive.

== Public collections ==
- FRAC Auvergne
- Direction de la culture, Canton de Saint-Gall, Suisse.
