= Sébastien Leclerc (disambiguation) =

Sébastien Leclerc may refer to:

- Sébastien Leclerc (1637–1714) French artist and engraver
- Sébastien II Leclerc (1676–1763), French painter, son of above
- Sébastien Leclerc (politician) (born 1970), French politician
