= Lucas de Clercq =

Dutch cloth merchant (1603–1652)

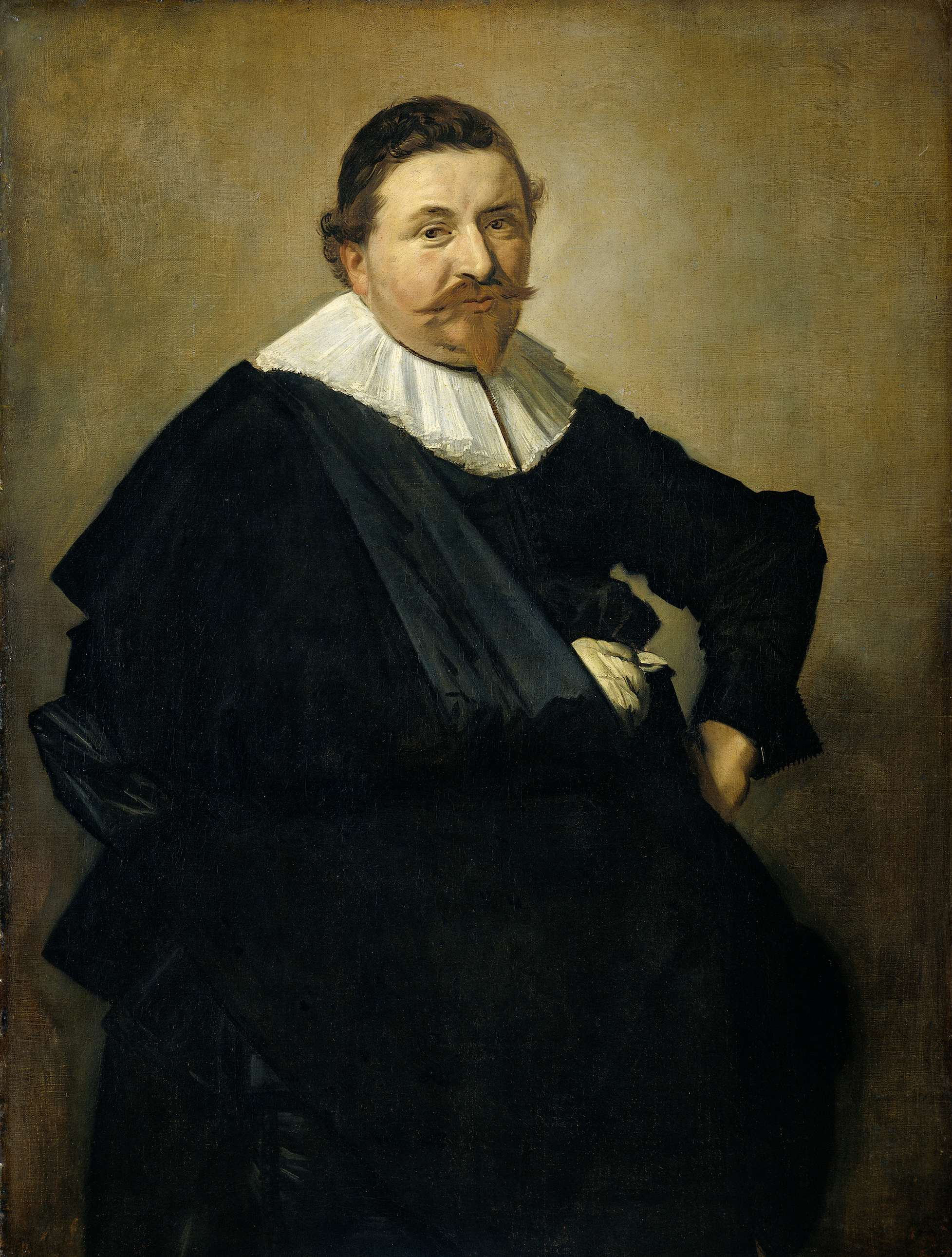
Portrait of Lucas de Clercq

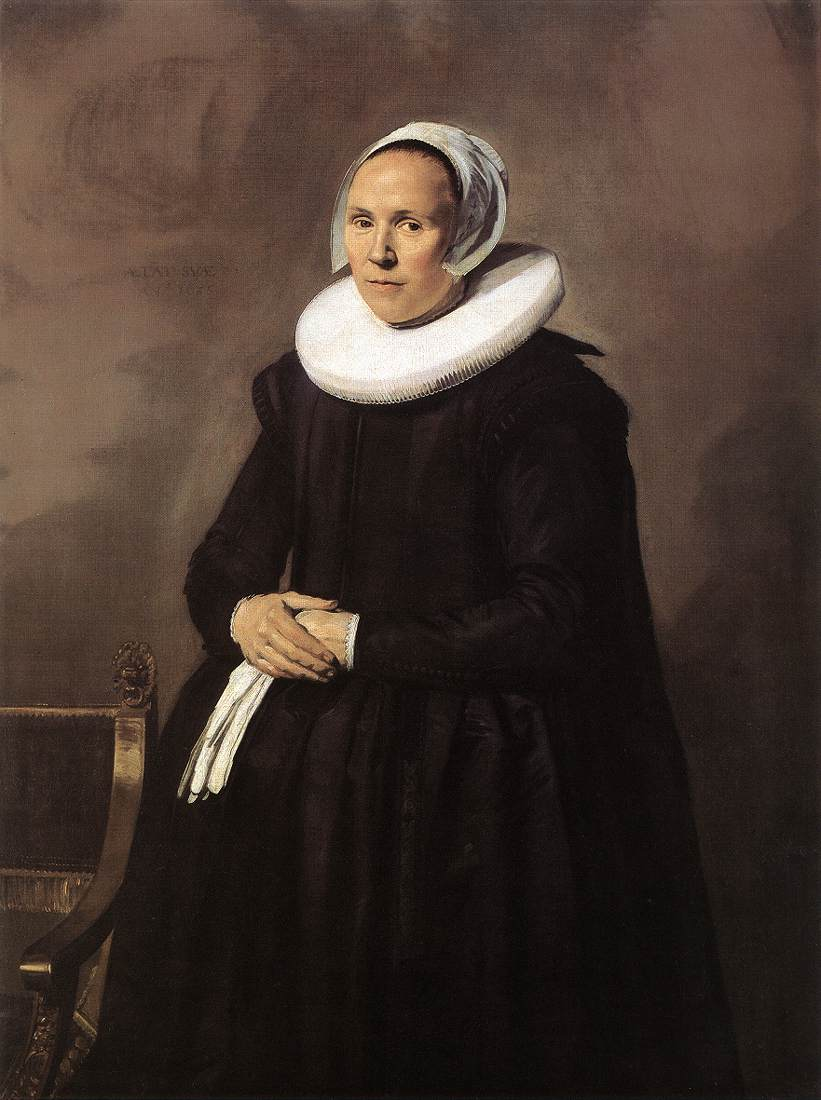
Portrait of Feyntje van Steenkiste

Lucas de Clercq (1603 – 1652) was a Dutch cloth merchant known today for his and his wife's pendant marriage portraits painted by Frans Hals.

== Biography ==
He was born in 1603, in Haarlem, to a wealthy Mennonite family from Rumbeeke. He became a merchant who dealt in potash, an ingredient used in the Haarlem bleaching industry for linens and linen yarn. He married the daughter of his supplier, Feyntje van Steenkiste and nine years after they married, Hals won the commission for their portraits. In 1638, they moved to a large house at the corner of the Berckenrodesteeg and the Spaarne street, near the central weigh house. De Clercq also owned the estate "Clercq & Beeck" in Overveen. Feyntje died in 1640, and De Clercq remarried Adriaentgen Keyser in 1645. He died in 1652, aged 48 or 49.

A painting by Dirck Bleker of the two of them with their children from their first marriages is in the collection of the Amsterdam Museum. Both the portrait of Lucas de Clercq and his wife Feyntje or Feyna remained in the De Clercq family for several generations, and were hanging in their buitenplaats called "Vredelust aan 't Geyn" in 1885. These portraits are among the earliest acquisitions of the Rijksmuseum.

== See also ==
- List of paintings by Frans Hals
