= Cleric (disambiguation) =

Cleric is a member of the clergy.

Cleric may also refer to:

- Cleric (band), an American avant-garde metal band
- Cleric (character class), a character class in fantasy role playing games
  - Cleric (Dungeons & Dragons), the specific character class from that game
- The Clerics, a 2013 Indonesian film
- The butterfly genus Amauris (friars and allies)
- The Cleric, an alien in the Eradicator (comics)
- The Grammaton Clerics, an order of mystic law enforcers in the 2002 film Equilibrium
- Clergy, a 2018 Polish comedy-drama film
