= Gilbert Declercq =

- Born: 1946 (age 79–80) Zwijnaarde, Belgium
- Area: Artist

Gilbert Declercq (born 1946) is a Belgian freelance painter, illustrator, and comics artist.

Declercq did his art-studies at The Royal Academy in Gent (Belgium).

== Publications ==
Declercq began his career in Ons Volkske at the age of 16, with the realistic short story "De D-558-2 Skyrocket." He made illustrations in female magazines, like Mimosa, Rosita, Libelle, and Het Rijk der Vrouw.

Comics and illustrations were published in many magazines and books in different countries. Clients include Reader's Digest, Daimler Chrysler, Greenpeace, Märklin and Dai Nippon.

From 1971, he did illustrations and covers for Ohee. In Le Soir, he created Hugo des Ombres with scripts by André-Paul Duchâteau in 1974. A year later, he illustrated the John Flanders adaptation De Witte Tijger with scripts by Serge Bertrain (Danny de Laet) in Het Gazet Van Antwerpen. From 1974, he assisted Eddy Ryssack on his comics. In the late 1970s, he did comics for Top (Devoon en Carboon) and Het Gazet van Antwerpen (De Lotgevallen van Terry Trom). He had his breakthrough with the aviation series Rud Hart, that appeared in the Dutch comic magazine Eppo starting in 1977. For the publisher Le Lombard, he created Jody Barton in 1991.

Declercq dropped most of his comics activities to devote himself to illustrating and painting. He is a regular contributor to the Dutch girls magazine Tina.

== Exhibitions ==
Declercq's work has been exhibited in The Mall-Galleries (London), National Maritime Museum (Antwerp, Belgium), European institute (Wien), Museum of American Illustration, Mystic Maritime Gallery and many galleries in Belgium, Austria and Italy. His watercolors won several national and international prizes (one juried by the Royal Watercolour Society, England).

His work is in State collections: National maritime Museum (Antwerp, Belgium), National Institute for Fishery (Ostend, Belgium), City of Innsbruck (Austria), Potterie Museum (Brugge, Belgium).

== Recognition ==
Gilbert Declercq became an artist-member of the Society of Illustrators (New York) in 1984.
