= Klerk =

(de) Klerk, (de) Klerck
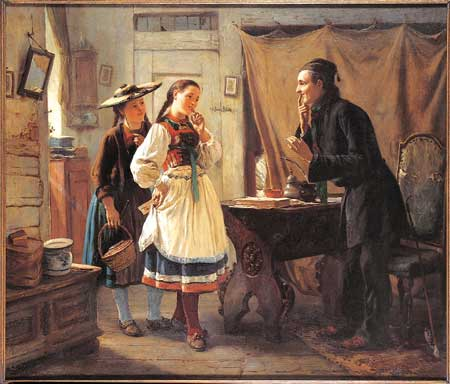

Origin
- Language: Dutch
- Meaning: clerk, scribe

De Klerk, Klerk, De Klerck, Deklerck or Klerck is surname of Dutch and Frisian origin.

De Klerk

- AJ de Klerk (born 1991), Namibian rugby player
- Bob de Klerk (born 1961), Dutch football player and manager
- Brent Deklerck (born 2006), Belgian gymnast
- Dirk de Klerk (1852–1920), Dutch politician
- Evette de Klerk (born 1965), South African sprinter
- Faf de Klerk (born 1991), South African rugby player
- Michel de Klerk (1884–1923), Dutch architect
- F. W. de Klerk (1936–2021), President of South Africa
- Jade de Klerk (born 1999), South African cricketer
- Jan de Klerk (1903–1979), South African politician, father of F.W.
- Jan de Klerk (rugby union) (born 1991), South African rugby player
- Marike de Klerk (1937–2001), South African politician, former wife of F.W. de Klerk
- Michel de Klerk (1884–1923), Dutch architect
- Nadine de Klerk (born 2000), South African cricketer
- Peter de Klerk (1935–2015), South African racing driver
- Rossouw de Klerk (born 1989), South African rugby player
- Thom de Klerk (1912–1966), Dutch bassoonist
- Veronica de Klerk (born 1947), Namibian women's rights activist

== Fictional characters ==
- Doctor Paulos de Klerk, a character in James Rollins and Grant Blackwood's novel The Kill Switch (2014)

== Klerk ==
- Barbara Klerk (born 1989), Belgian figure skater
- Sander Jan Klerk (born 1982), Dutch actor, singer

== Klerck / de Klerck ==
- Carl-Gustaf Klerck (1885–1976), Swedish Olympic fencer
- Hendrick de Klerck (c.1560–1630), Flemish painter
- Reynier de Klerck (1710–1780), Governor-General of the Dutch East Indies
