= Leclerc (surname) =

Leclerc, Le Clerc and LeClerc are French language surnames literally meaning the occupation of clerk, scribe, Notable people with the surnames include:

- Alix Le Clerc (1576–1622), French religious leader and founder of the Canonesses of Saint-Augustin of the Notre-Dame Congregation; also known as Mother Alix
- Daniel Le Clerc (1652–1728), Swiss medical writer
- Antoine Leclerc (born 1981), French racing driver
- Arthur Leclerc (born 2000), Monégasque racing driver and younger brother of Charles Leclerc
- Charles Leclerc (disambiguation), several people
  - Charles Leclerc (born 1997), Monégasque racing driver
- Édouard Leclerc (1926–2012), the founder of the French supermarket chain E.Leclerc
- Félix Leclerc (1914–1988), Québécois folk singer
- François Leclerc, various people:
  - François Le Clerc (died 1563), French pirate
  - François Leclerc (1877–1957), Swiss cyclist
  - François Leclerc du Tremblay (1577–1638), French Capuchin friar, confidant and agent of Cardinal Richelieu, also known as Père Joseph and the original éminence grise
- Fud Leclerc (1924–2010), Belgian singer
- Georges-Louis Leclerc, Comte de Buffon (1707–1788), French scientist
- Ginette Leclerc (1912–1992), French film actress
- Jean Leclerc, several people
- José Leclerc (born 1993), Dominican baseball player
- Joseph-Victor Leclerc (1789–1865), French scholar and linguist
- Kim Leclerc (born 1985), Canadian politician
- Marc-Andre Leclerc (1992–2018), Canadian rock climber
- Mike Leclerc (born 1976), Canadian ice hockey player
- Philippe Leclerc, various people:
  - Philippe Leclerc (footballer) (born 1969), French footballer and sporting director
  - Philippe Leclerc de Hauteclocque (1902–1947), French general in World War II
- Robin Leclerc (born 1952), French former footballer
- Roger LeClerc (1936–2021), American football player
- Sébastien Leclerc (disambiguation), several people
- Valérie Leclerc (born 1961), French sprint canoeist

== Fictional characters ==
- Monsieur Roger LeClerc, incompetent Resistance activist in the farce 'Allo 'Allo!
- Monsieur Ernest LeClerc, his brother and successor

== See also ==
- LeClair (surname)
