= Clerc =

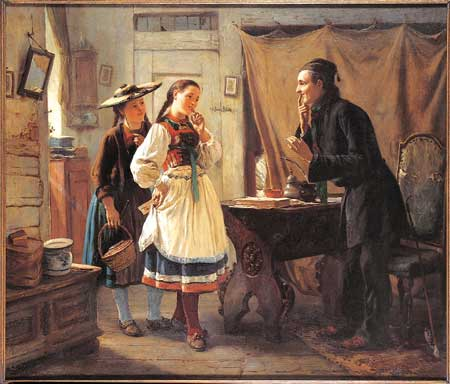

Origin
- Language: French
- Meaning: clerk, scribe
- Region of origin: France

Clerc is a French surname. Notable people with the surname include:

- Albert Clerc, French chess player
- Aurélien Clerc, Swiss cyclist
- François Clerc, French footballer
- José Luis Clerc, Argentine tennis player
- Jub Clerc, Australian filmmaker
- Julien Clerc, French singer
- Laurent Clerc, teacher, co-founder of the first school for the deaf in North America
- Maurice Clerc (mathematician), French mathematician
- Maurice Clerc (organist), French organist
- Mialitiana Clerc (born 2001), Malagasy alpine skier
- Onésime Clerc, Swiss born Russian naturalist
- Vincent Clerc, French rugby union player

== Fictional characters ==
- Jux Clerc, a character in Sign Gene: The First Deaf Superheroes
- Tom Clerc, a character in Sign Gene: The First Deaf Superheroes
