= De Standaard =

Dutch-language Belgian daily newspaper published by Mediahuis

- De Standaard front page on 7 May 2025
- Type: Daily newspaper
- Format: Compact
- Owner: Mediahuis
- Editor: Bart Sturtewagen; Karel Verhoeven
- Founded: 1918; 108 years ago
- Language: Dutch
- Headquarters: Kantersteen 47, 1000 City of Brussels, Brussels-Capital Region, Belgium
- Circulation: 98,000 (2009)
- Sister newspapers: Het Nieuwsblad
- Website: www.standaard.be

De Standaard (Dutch pronunciation: [də ˈstɑndaːrt], lit. 'The Standard') is a Flemish daily newspaper published in Belgium by Mediahuis (formerly Corelio and VUM). It was traditionally a Christian-Democratic paper, associated with the Christian-Democratic and Flemish Party, and in opposition to the Socialist Flemish daily De Morgen. In recent years De Standaard has renounced its original ideological ties.

== History and profile ==
In 1911, Frans Van Cauwelaert founded Ons Volk Ontwaakt, the weekly journal of the Flemish Catholic student organization.

In 1914, Van Cauwelaert, Alfons Van de Perre, and Arnold Hendrix formed a publishing company, De Standaard N.V. ("The Standard, Incorporated": the Standard Group). Their goal was to publish a conservative, Catholic, Flemish daily newspaper in Brussels, to be called De Standaard. The motto of De Standaard was Alles voor Vlaanderen - Vlaanderen voor Kristus ("Everything for Flanders - Flanders for Christ"), abbreviated AVV-VVK. AVV-VVK appeared in De Standaard's front-page banner until 1999. The first edition was to appear on 22 November 1914, but publication was cancelled due to the outbreak of World War I. De Standaard did not appear until 4 December 1918, after the war ended. Gustave Sap, who joined the board of directors in 1919, provided the necessary capital for its initial expansion. The paper was started as a conservative daily with Catholic values.

In 1940, during the Second World War, Belgium was occupied by Nazi Germany. De Standaard again ceased publication. However, a new paper, Het Algemeen Nieuws ("The General News") was published with De Standaard's staff and presses, printing only what the Nazi occupation government permitted. After the liberation of Belgium in 1944, the management of Standard Group was accused of collaboration with the Nazi occupiers, and the company was banned for two years. A new company was therefore created: De Gids N.V. ("The Guide, Inc."), which began publishing De Nieuwe Standaard ("The New Standard") in November 1944. Older titles of the Standaard group were also continued by De Gids.

In 1947, the ban on Standard Group was removed, and with court permission the company reclaimed all its titles. De Nieuwe Standaard was immediately renamed De Nieuwe Gids, and then, as of 1 May, De Standaard again.

In the 1960s and 1970s, De Standaard was famous for its high-quality and independent foreign affairs coverage. For example, despite its Catholic and conservative ties, De Standaard was critical of American policy in southeast Asia.

However, the financial condition of Standard Group deteriorated, becoming critical in 1976. Standard Group declared bankruptcy on 22 June. De Standaard was rescued by André Leysen, a Belgian businessman, who formed Vlaamse Uitgeversmaatschappij N.V. (VUM - "Flemish Publishers Partnership"). VUM took over Standard Group's titles, and became the publisher of De Standaard. VUM changed its name to Corelio in 2006. The sister newspaper of De Standaard is Het Nieuwsblad.

Since 30 September 1999 the newspaper has stopped printing the lettercross AVV-VVK on its frontpage. In March 2004, De Standaard changed its format from traditional broadsheet to compact format. Unlike common practice for most of the newspapers this change occurred during its modernization process, not as a response to low circulation levels.

On 9 January 2017 De Standaard fired its controversial columnist, Dyab Abou Jahjah, after the latter made comments on Twitter that condoned the 2017 Jerusalem truck attack.

== Circulation ==
In 2002 De Standaard had a circulation of 98,169 copies. The circulation of the paper was also reported to be 93,500 copies in 2002. The paper had a circulation of 79,000 copies in 2003 and 81,000 copies in 2004.

The circulation of the paper was 102,280 copies in 2007. During the first quarter of 2009 the paper had a circulation of 107,888 copies. In 2009 its paid circulation was about 98,000 copies.

== Notable journalists ==
- Gaston Durnez
- Maria Rosseels (1916–2005), film critic and writer
