= John Clarke =

John Clarke may refer to:

== Arts ==
=== Performing arts and writing ===
- John Clarke (actor) (1931–2019), American soap opera actor from Days of Our Lives
- John Clarke (musician) (1883–1912), British musician; bassist aboard RMS Titanic
- John Clarke (poet) (1933–1992), American poet
- John Clarke (satirist) (1948–2017), New Zealand/Australian satirist and actor
- John Cooper Clarke (born 1949), British performance poet, active since the late 1970s
- John Sleeper Clarke (1833–1899), American/British actor and manager

=== Visual arts ===
- John Louis Clarke (1881–1970), Blackfoot wood carver from Montana
- John S. Clarke (1885–1959), British art expert, lion tamer, politician, and poet
- John Clem Clarke (1937–2021), American painter and graphic artist

=== Others ===
- John Clarke (museum curator) (1954–2020), British museum curator, expert in Ladakhi and Tibetan metalwork
- John Clarke Whitfield (1770–1836), English organist and composer
- Bryan Forbes or John Theobald Clarke (1926–2013), English filmmaker, actor, and novelist

== Business ==
- John Clarke, whaler and one of the discoverers of Jan Mayen
- John Clarke (businessman) (1773–1846), American businessman from Saratoga Springs, New York

== Government and politics ==
=== Canada ===
- John Clarke (Upper Canada) (1780s-1862), merchant and politician in Upper Canada
- John Fitzgerald Clarke (1827–1887), Ontario, Canada MPP
- John M. Clarke (1854–1936), lumber merchant, contractor and political figure on Prince Edward Island
- John Clarke (activist), Canadian political activist and founder of the Ontario Coalition Against Poverty

=== New Zealand ===
- John Clarke (public servant) (born 1942), New Zealand public servant

=== United Kingdom ===
- John Clarke (fl. 1601), MP for Haslemere
- John Clarke (died 1675), English landowner and politician
- Richard Cromwell or John Clarke (1626–1712), second Lord Protector of England, Scotland and Ireland
- John Clarke (Roundhead) (fl. 1648–1681), English politician who sat in the House of Commons between 1653 and 1660, and fought for Parliament in the English Civil War and the Cromwellian conquest of Ireland
- John Creemer Clarke (1821–1895), British Member of Parliament

=== United States ===
- John Hopkins Clarke (1789–1870), U.S. Senator from Rhode Island, 1847–1852
- John Clarke (Michigan politician) (1797–1876), American businessman, farmer, and politician
- John Jones Clarke (1803–1887), American politician in the Massachusetts legislature
- John C. Clarke (1831–1906), American politician in the Wisconsin legislature
- John Blades Clarke (1833–1911), U.S. representative from Kentucky, 1875–1876
- John Proctor Clarke (1856–1932), judge in New York State
- John Hessin Clarke (1857–1945), associate justice of the US Supreme Court
- John D. Clarke (1873–1933), U.S. representative from New York, 1921–1924 and 1927–1934
- John Clark (Georgia governor) (sometimes spelled Clarke; 1766–1832), Governor of Georgia from 1819 to 1823

== Military ==
- Sir John Clarke (British army officer) (1787–1854), officer in the British and Spanish armies
- John Thomas Clarke (1868–1947), head of the Canadian military medical service

== Religion ==
- John Clarke (Baptist minister) (1609–1676), co-founder of Rhode Island
- John Clarke (dean of Salisbury) (1682–1757), dean of Salisbury Cathedral, mathematician and natural philosopher
- John Clarke (Congregationalist minister) (1755–1798), minister, First Church, Boston, Massachusetts
- John Clarke (Baptist missionary) (1802–1879), author of Specimens of Dialects
- J. Richard Clarke (1927–2022), leader in The Church of Jesus Christ of Latter-day Saints
- John Clarke (bishop) (born 1938), retired bishop of the Anglican Church of Canada
- John Clarke (dean of Wells) (born 1952), Dean of Wells 2004–15

== Science, medicine, and academia ==
- John Clarke (provost) (died 1781), provost of Oriel College, Oxford
- John Henry Clarke (1853–1931), English classical homeopath
- John Mason Clarke (1857–1925), American paleontologist from New York
- John L. Clarke (1905–1991), served as president of Ricks College
- John Henrik Clarke (1915–1998), self-taught scholar who became an authority on African history and an advocate for Black Studies
- John Frederick Clarke (1927–2013), English aeronautical engineer
- John Clarke (physician, 1582–1653), English physician
- John Clarke (physician, 1761–1815), English physician and obstetrician
- John Clarke (physicist) (born 1942), English physicist at University of California at Berkeley and Nobel prize laureate
- John Clarke (mountaineer) (1945–2003), Canadian mountaineer, explorer and wilderness educator
- John R. Clarke (scientist) (born 1945), serves as Scientific Director at the United States Navy Experimental Diving Unit
- John R. Clarke (historian), Professor in Fine Arts at the University of Texas at Austin
- John T. Clarke, (born 1952), American astronomer

== Sports ==
=== Cricket ===
- John Clarke (Australian cricketer) (1829–1872)
- John Clarke (cricketer, born 1948), English cricketer

=== Football ===
- John Clarke (Scottish footballer) (fl. 1890s), footballer who played for Bury, Blackpool and Luton Town
- John Clarke (English footballer) (fl. 1910s–1920s), English football forward
- John Clarke (footballer, born 2004), English footballer
- John Clarke (rugby league) (1913–1973), Australian rugby league player
- John Clarke (rugby union) (born 1975), New Zealand-born Samoan rugby union player
- John Clarke (Gaelic footballer) (fl. 2000s), Gaelic footballer for Down

=== Other sports ===
- John Clarke (sailor) (1934–2022), Canadian Olympic sailor
- John Clarke (hurler) (1899–1962), Irish hurler
- John Erskine Clarke (1827–1920), British rower and clergyman who founded the first parish magazine

== Other people ==
- John Clarke (bushranger) (c. 1846–1867), Australian bushranger
- John N. Clarke (born 1972), United Nations official

== See also ==
- John Clark (disambiguation)
- Jack Clarke (disambiguation)
- Jackie Clarke (disambiguation)
- Jon Clarke (disambiguation)
- John Clerk (disambiguation)
- John Clerke (disambiguation)
