= John Clark =

John Clark may refer to:

== Entertainment ==
- John Clark or Signor Brocolini (1841–1906), Irish-born American operatic singer and actor
- John Clark (actor) (1932–2023), English actor and theatre director
- John Clark (musician) (born 1944), American jazz horn player and composer
- John Clark (born 1978), Scottish indie/electronic musician from the band Bis who is also known as John Disco
- John Drury Clark (1907–1988), American author, chemist and rocket scientist
- John Heaviside Clark (c. 1771–1836), Scottish engraver and painter

== Military ==
- John Clark (spy), American spy during the American Revolutionary War
- John George Walters Clark (1892–1948), British army officer
- John W. Clark (Medal of Honor) (1830–1898), American soldier in the American Civil War

== Politics ==
=== American ===
- John Clark (Delaware governor) (1761–1821), governor and farmer of Delaware
- John Clark (Georgia governor) (1766–1832), politician and governor of Georgia
- John Clark (Minnesota politician) (c. 1825–1904), Minnesota state senator
- John Clark (Utah politician) (1834–1908), mayor of Salt Lake City, Utah
- John Bullock Clark (1802–1885), politician and U.S. representative from Missouri and Confederate congressman
- John Bullock Clark Jr. (1831–1903), politician and U.S. representative from Missouri
- John C. Clark (1793–1852), politician and U.S. representative from New York
- John Davidson Clark (1884–1961), lawyer, member of the Council of Economic Advisers (1946–1953)
- John E. Clark (politician) (1910–2003), politician and judge
- John F. Clark, ninth director of the United States Marshals Service
- John Gee Clark (1890–1984), member of the California legislature
- John M. Clark (1821–1902), Sheriff of Suffolk County, Massachusetts
- John S. Clark (1892–1960), Illinois politician
- John T. Clark, politician and civil engineer from New York

=== Canadian ===
- John Clark (Canadian politician) (1835–1896), Scottish-born politician in Ontario, Canada
- John Arthur Clark (1886–1976), Conservative member of the Canadian House of Commons
- John Etter Clark (1915–1956), member of the Legislative Assembly of Alberta, 1952–1959

=== Other uses in politics ===
- John Allworth Clark (1846–1932), Australian politician - mayor of Brisbane
- John Clark (Roundhead) (fl. 1650s), English member of parliament and colonel in Cromwell's army
- John Harrison Clark (c. 1860–1927), Cape Colony adventurer who ruled much of southern Zambia
- John Clark (Australian politician) (1907–1984), sat in the South Australian House of Assembly
- John Clark (Welsh politician)

== Science and academics ==
- John Clark (inventor) (1785–1853), British printer and inventor
- John Brown Clark (1861–1947), mathematician, Vice President of the Royal Society of Edinburgh
- J. Desmond Clark (1916–2002), British archaeologist
- J. P. Clark (John Pepper Clark-Bekederemo, 1935–2020), Nigerian poet and professor
- John Bates Clark (1847–1938), American economist
- John Drury Clark (1907–1988), American author (as John D. Clark), chemist and rocket scientist
- John E. Clark (born 1952), American anthropologist
- John Frank Clark, American Africanist and professor of International Relations
- John Gordon Clark (1926–1999), Harvard psychiatrist and pioneer cult researcher
- John Maurice Clark (1884–1963), American economist
- John P. Clark (born 1945), American philosopher and anarchist
- John S. Clark (1885–1956), Scottish entomologist
- John Walter Clark (born 1935), American physicist
- John Willis Clark (1833–1910), English academic and antiquarian

== Sports ==
- John Clark (baseball) (born 2000), Taiwanese baseball player
- John Clark (basketball player), member of the Northeastern University athletics Hall of Fame
- John Clark (basketball coach) (born 1937), American basketball coach
- John Clark (boxer) (1849–1922), Irish-American bare-knuckle boxer
- Johnny Clark (1947–2020), English boxer
- John Clark (cricketer) (born 1928), Australian cricketer
- John Clark (English footballer), footballer for Bradford City and Cardiff City
- John Clark (footballer, born 1941) (1941–2025), footballer formerly with Celtic F.C., one of the Lisbon Lions
- John Clark (footballer, born 1964), footballer formerly with Dundee United
- John Clark (rugby league) (died 2011), English rugby league footballer of the 1950s and 1960s
- John Clark (Australian rower) (born 1948)
- John Clark (New Zealand rower) (born 1944)

== Other ==
- John Clark (physician) (1744–1805), Scottish medical practitioner in Newcastle upon Tyne
- John Clark (chaplain) (1784–1853), American clergyman who served as chaplain of the senate
- John Clark (land agent) (died 1807), Scottish writer
- John Kinzie Clark (1792–1865), trader, trapper and early settler in the Chicago area
- John Howard Clark (1830–1878), editor of The South Australian Register, 1870–1877
- John Kirkland Clark (1877–1963), New York City assistant district attorney
- John Allen Clark (1926–2001), British businessman
- John Clark (Ryanverse character), a character in the Ryanverse created by Tom Clancy
- John Clark Jr., detective in the American television series NYPD Blue

== See also ==
- Jon Clark (disambiguation)
- John Bates Clark Medal, an award given by the American Economic Association
- John Clark Field, a multi-use stadium in Plano, Texas, United States
- Capt. John Clark House, a historic house near Canterbury, Connecticut, United States
- John Clark House (Clarksdale, Mississippi), a historic house in Clarksdale, Mississippi, United States
- John Clarke (disambiguation)
- John Clerk (disambiguation)
- John Clerke (disambiguation)
- Jonathan Clark (disambiguation)
