= John Clerk =

John Clerk may refer to:

- John Clerk (fl. 1414), MP for Reading
- John Clerk (fl. 1419–1421), MP for Shaftesbury, perhaps also an attorney or yeoman
- John Clerk (bishop) (died 1541), bishop of Bath and Wells
- John Clerk of Eldin (1728–1812), Scottish Enlightenment figure, artist, and author of An Essay on Naval Tactics
- John Clerk (writer) (died 1552), English Roman Catholic writer
- John Clerk, Lord Eldin (1757–1832), Scottish judge
- John Clarke (physician, 1582–1653), English physician, also spelt Clerk
- Clerk baronets
  - John Clerk (merchant) (1611–1674), Scottish merchant
  - Sir John Clerk, 1st Baronet (died 1722), member of the Parliament of Scotland
  - Sir John Clerk, 2nd Baronet (1676–1755), Scottish lawyer, judge, and composer
  - Sir John Clerk, 5th Baronet (1736–1798), Royal Navy officer

== See also ==
- John Clerke (disambiguation)
- John Clark (disambiguation)
- John Clarke (disambiguation)
- Clerk (disambiguation)
