= John Sherburne =

John Sherburne may refer to:

- John Sherburne (pioneer) (1615–1693), emigrant from England to New England
- John Samuel Sherburne (1757–1830), U.S. representative from New Hampshire
- John C. Sherburne (1883–1959), Vermont attorney and judge
- John H. Sherburne (1877–1959), U.S. Army brigadier general

== See also ==
- John Sherburne Sleeper (1794–1878), American sailor, writer and politician
