= John Clerke (disambiguation) =

John Clerke was a 17th-century English politician.

John Clerke may also refer to:

- John Clerke (died 1528), MP for Norwich
- John Clerke (MP for Bath) (fl. c. 1525–54), MP for Bath
- John Clarke (physician, 1582–1653), English physician. His last name was also spelt Clerke.

== See also ==
- John Clerk (disambiguation)
- John Clarke (disambiguation)
- John Clark (disambiguation)
