= 1824 Massachusetts's 10th congressional district special election =

A special election was held in Massachusetts's 10th congressional district to fill a vacancy caused by John Bailey (DR) being declared not eligible for the seat which he had won the previous year on March 24, 1824. The election was held on August 30, 1824, with additional ballots held on November 1 and November 29 due to a majority not being achieved on the first or second ballot.

== Election results ==
Candidate	Party	First ballot		Second ballot		Third ballot	
Candidate	Party	Votes	Percent	Votes	Percent	Votes	Percent
John Bailey	Adams-Clay Republican	871	47.3%	1,112	42.1%	1,661	50.1%
Sher Leland	Democratic-Republican	567	30.8%				
Richard Sullivan	Federalist			672	25.5%		
Rufus G. Amory	Unknown					1,038	31.3%
Samuel Bugbee	Unknown			643	24.4%	472	14.2%
Scattering		402	21.9%	213	8.1%	147	4.4%

Bailey was seated again December 13, 1824.

== See also ==
- List of special elections to the United States House of Representatives
- 1824 and 1825 United States House of Representatives elections
