= Jack Clark =

Jack Clark may refer to:

== Arts and media ==
- Jack Clark (Australian director), writer-director of the 2023 horror film Birdeater
- Jack Clark (television personality) (1925–1988), American television game show host and announcer
- Jack J. Clark (1879–1947), American actor and director

== Sportsmen ==
- Jack Clark (baseball) (born 1955), Major League Baseball player
- Jack Clark (cricketer) (born 1994), English cricketer
- Jack Clark (footballer) (1924–2012), Australian footballer
- Jack Clark (rugby union), American rugby coach and former rugby union player

== Others ==
- Jack Clark (AI policy expert), co-founder of Anthropic

== See also ==
- Jack Clarke (disambiguation)
- Jackie Clark (disambiguation)
- John Clark (disambiguation)
