= Jon Clark (disambiguation) =

Jon Clark is a TV personality.

Jon Clark may also refer to:

- Jon Clark (field hockey), represented United States at the 1996 Summer Olympics
- Jon Clark (lighting designer), see 2015 Laurence Olivier Awards
- Jon Clark (rugby league), played in 1972 Manly-Warringah Sea Eagles season
- Jon Clark (American football), American football offensive tackle
- Jon Clark (NASA), see NASA's Story
- Jon Clark (basketball), played in 2007–08 BC Mures season
- Jon Clark (editor), of the UK tabloid newspaper Daily Star

== See also ==
- Jonathan Clark (disambiguation)
- John Clark (disambiguation)
