= Senator Clarke =

Senator Clarke may refer to:

== Members of the United States Senate ==
- James Paul Clarke (1854–1916), U.S. Senator from Arkansas from 1903 to 1916
- John Hopkins Clarke (1789–1870), U.S. Senator from Rhode Island from 1847 to 1853

== United States state senate members ==
- Archibald S. Clarke (1788–1821), New York State Senate
- Eugene Clarke (born 1956), Mississippi State Senate
- Frank Gay Clarke (1850–1901), New Hampshire State Senate
- George L. Clarke (1813–1890), Rhode Island State Senate
- George W. Clarke (Washington politician) (1906–2006), Washington State Senate
- Hansen Clarke (born 1957), Michigan State Senate
- James M. Clarke (1917–1999), North Carolina State Senate
- John Blades Clarke (1833–1911), Kentucky State Senate
- John Jones Clarke (1803–1887), Massachusetts State Senate
- John Clarke (Michigan politician) (1797–1876), Michigan State Senate
- Kathryn Clarke (politician) (1873–1940), Oregon State Senate
- S. D. Clarke (1881–1966), Florida State Senate
- Terrel E. Clarke (1920–1997), Illinois State Senate
