= Senator Sleeper =

Senator Sleeper may refer to:

- Albert Sleeper (1862–1934), Michigan State Senate
- John Sherburne Sleeper (1794–1878), Massachusetts State Senate
