= Senator Clark =

Senator Clark may refer to:

== Members of the Northern Irish Senate ==
- Sir George Clark, 1st Baronet (1861–1935), Northern Irish Senator from 1925 to 1935
- Sir George Clark, 3rd Baronet (1914–1991), Northern Irish Senator from 1951 to 1969
- William Moore Wallis Clark (1897–1971), Northern Irish Senator from 1946 to 1961

== Members of the United States Senate ==
- Bennett Champ Clark (1890–1954), U.S. Senator from Missouri from 1933 to 1945
- Daniel Clark (New Hampshire politician) (1809–1891), U.S. Senator from New Hampshire from 1866 to 1891
- David Worth Clark (1902–1955), U.S. Senator from Idaho from 1939 to 1945
- Clarence D. Clark (1851–1930), U.S. Senator from Wyoming from 1895 to 1917
- Dick Clark (senator) (born 1928), U.S. Senator from Iowa from 1973 to 1979
- Joseph S. Clark Jr. (1901–1990), U.S. Senator from Pennsylvania from 1957 to 1969
- William A. Clark (1839–1925), U.S. Senator from Montana from 1901 to 1907

== United States state senate members ==
- Alan Clark (Arkansas politician) (born 1960), Arkansas State Senate
- Amos Clark Jr. (1828–1912), New Jersey State Senate
- Ben Clark (politician) (fl, 2010s), North Carolina State Senate
- Chase A. Clark (1883–1966), Idaho State Senate
- Edward Clark (governor) (1815–1880), Texas State Senate
- Eugene Clark (politician) (1850–1932), Wisconsin State Senate
- Franklin Clark (1801–1874), Maine State Senate
- Henry A. Clark (New York politician) (1818–1906), New York State Senate
- Henry Alden Clark (1850–1944), Pennsylvania State Senate
- Henry Toole Clark (1808–1874), North Carolina State Senate
- J. Murray Clark (fl. 1990s–2010s), Indiana State Senate
- James S. Clark (1921–2000), Alabama State Senate
- James Clark (Kentucky politician) (1779–1839), Kentucky State Senate
- James Clark Jr. (1918–2006), Maryland State Senate
- Jim Clark (offensive lineman) (1929–2000), Hawaii State Senate
- John Clark (Minnesota politician) (1825–1904), Minnesota State Senate
- Joseph Clark (New York politician) (1787–1873), New York State Senate
- Katherine Clark (born 1963), Massachusetts State Senate
- Martha Fuller Clark (born 1942), New Hampshire State Senate
- Merritt Clark (1803–1898), Vermont State Senate
- Myron H. Clark (1806–1892), New York State Senate
- Nancy Randall Clark (1938–2015), Maine State Senate
- Orville Clark (1801–1862), New York State Senate
- Perry B. Clark (born 1955), Kentucky State Senate
- Satterlee Clark Jr. (1816–1881), Wisconsin State Senate
- Tarryl Clark (born 1961), Minnesota State Senate
- Ted D. Clark (1920–1980), Iowa State Senate
- William G. Clark (1924–2001), Illinois State Senate
- William Walter Clark (1885–1971), Wisconsin State Senate
- William Clark (politician, born 1811) (1811–1885), New York State Senate
- Wilson Hart Clark (1820–1887), Connecticut State Senate
- Zenas Clark (1795–1864), New York State Senate

== See also ==
- Irma Clark-Coleman (born 1937), Michigan State Senate
- John Bullock Clark (1802-1885), Confederate States Senator from Missouri from 1862 to 1864
- Senator Clarke (disambiguation)
