= 1823 Massachusetts's 10th congressional district special election =

A special election was held in Massachusetts's 10th congressional district on September 8, 1823, to fill a vacancy created by the resignation of William Eustis (DR) prior to the start of the 18th Congress.

== Election results ==
Candidate	Party	Votes	Percent
John Bailey	Adams-Clay Republican	996	59.0%
John Ames	Federalist	567	33.6%
Sher Leland	126	7.5%	

Bailey was subsequently declared not eligible for his seat, vacating his seat on March 18, 1824. Another special election was held which re-elected Bailey.

== See also ==
- List of special elections to the United States House of Representatives
