= Henry Alexander Scammell Dearborn =

American politician

- portrait by Gilbert Stuart

Member of the U.S. House of Representatives from Massachusetts's 10th district
- In office March 4, 1831 – March 3, 1833
- Preceded by: John Bailey
- Succeeded by: William Baylies

2nd Mayor of Roxbury, Massachusetts
- In office 1847 – July 29, 1851
- Preceded by: John Jones Clarke
- Succeeded by: Samuel Walker

9th Adjutant General of Massachusetts
- In office February 5, 1835 – March 6, 1843
- Preceded by: William H. Sumner
- Succeeded by: Joseph E. Boyd

Member of the Massachusetts Senate
- In office 1830

Member of the Massachusetts House of Representatives
- In office 1829

Personal details
- Born: March 3, 1783 Exeter, New Hampshire
- Died: June 29, 1851 (aged 68) Portland, Maine
- Party: National Republican
- Spouse: Hannah Swett Lee
- Relations: A nephew was Civil War US General William Raymond Lee (1807-1891)
- Children: Julia Maragretta Dearborn, William Dearborn, Henry George Raleigh
- Education: College of William and Mary
- Profession: Attorney
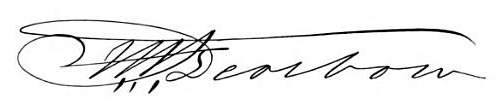
- Signature

Henry Alexander Scammell Dearborn (March 3, 1783 – July 29, 1851) was an American soldier, lawyer, author, and statesman. Dearborn was the first President of the Massachusetts Horticultural Society, a member of the Society of the Cincinnati, and the author of many books.

== Biography ==
=== Early life ===
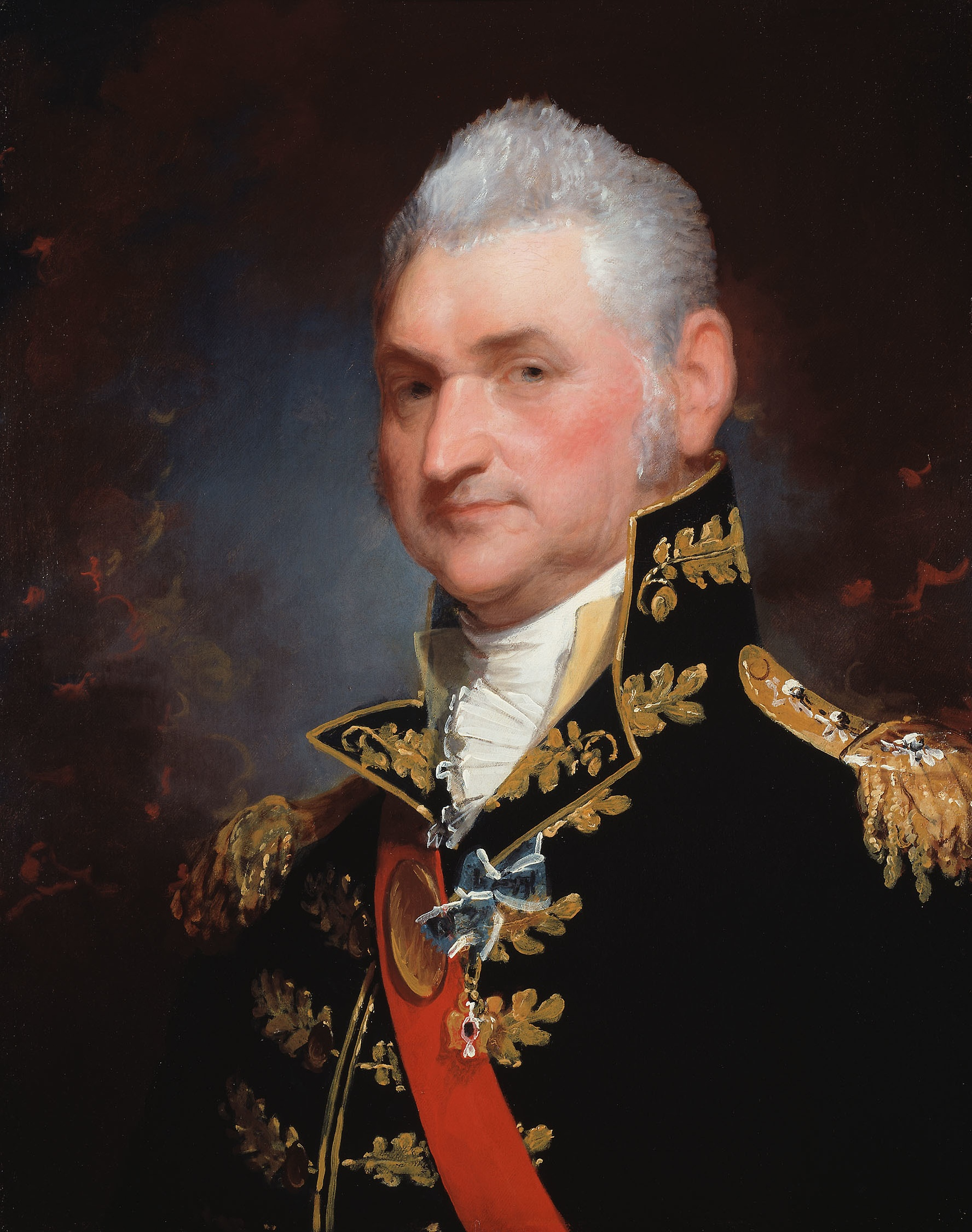
Portrait of Henry Dearborn by Gilbert Stuart, 1812

Dearborn was the son of Secretary of War and Major General Henry Dearborn by his second wife and named for his father's friend, Alexander Scammell.

Dearborn was married to Hannah Swett Lee, daughter of Colonel William Raymond Lee (1745–1824) of Massachusetts.

Dearborn attended the common schools; attended Williams College for two years; and graduated from the College of William and Mary in 1803.

=== Early career ===
Dearborn studied law, was admitted to the bar, and practiced in Salem, Massachusetts, and Portland (then part of Massachusetts's District of Maine).

In 1808 he oversaw the construction of Fort Preble and Fort Scammel in the harbor defenses of Portland. During the War of 1812 he commanded volunteers manning the defenses of Boston harbor. He replaced his father as the Collector of the Port of Boston and served from 1813 to 1829. He was promoted to brigadier general in the Massachusetts Militia in 1814.

After the war, he was elected captain of the Ancient and Honorable Artillery Company of Massachusetts in 1816. Dearborn was also elected a member of the American Antiquarian Society in 1815, and a Fellow of the American Academy of Arts and Sciences in 1823.

=== Political career ===
Dearborn was a delegate to the Massachusetts Constitutional Convention of 1820–1821. He was a member of the Massachusetts state house of representatives in 1829 and a member of the Massachusetts Senate in 1830. He was elected as an Anti-Jacksonian Representative from Massachusetts 10th District to the Twenty-second Congress (1831–1833). He was defeated running for reelection in 1832.

He served as adjutant general of the Massachusetts Militia with the rank of major general from 1834 to 1843.

He was elected Mayor of Roxbury, Massachusetts, in 1846 and served from 1847 to 1851. In 1848, while he was Mayor of Roxbury, Dearborn designed and founded the Forest Hills Cemetery. He also designed Mount Auburn Cemetery in Cambridge, Massachusetts, the first rural cemetery in the nation.

== Society of the Cincinnati ==
In 1832, following the decease of his father, he was admitted to the Massachusetts Society of the Cincinnati. In 1848, following the death of President General William Popham in September 1847, he was elected as President General of the Society. He was the first President General to be a hereditary member rather than a veteran of the Revolution.

As President General he proposed changes in the Society's membership rules to allow for descendants of other than original members to join. This provision is known as the Rule of 1854.

He died in office in 1851, having served a single three-year term.

=== Attempted Vice Presidential Nomination ===
The Native American Party, a precursor to the Know Nothings, which had split from the Whig Party in 1845, met in September 1847 in Philadelphia, where they nominated Zachary Taylor for president while Dearborn was selected as his running mate. However, when the Whig Party nominated Taylor for the presidency with Millard Fillmore as his running mate the following year, this rendered his previous nomination moot and the Native American Party failed to make an alternate nomination.

=== Death and interment ===
Dearborn died on July 29, 1851, at the age of 68 in Portland, Maine, and is interred in Forest Hills Cemetery in Jamaica Plain, Massachusetts.

== Legacy ==
The dearborn, a light four-wheeled carriage with curtained sides, was named after him (he maintained such a carriage).

Dearborn's nephew was William R. Lee (1807–1891), who was colonel of the 20th Massachusetts Infantry Regiment during the Civil War and was breveted to brigadier general after the war.

Three successive grade schools in Roxbury have been named after General Dearborn: The first was built in 1852; the second, still standing at 25 Ambrose Street, was built in 1905; and after that closed, the old Roxbury High School was renamed the Dearborn Middle School in 1981. A fourth school, the Dearborn STEM School, is now in the planning stages.

== Notes ==
U.S. House of Representatives
Preceded by John Bailey	Member of the U.S. House of Representatives from Massachusetts's 10th congressional district March 4, 1831–March 3, 1833	Succeeded by William Baylies
Political offices
Preceded by John Jones Clarke	Mayor of Roxbury, Massachusetts; 1847 - 1851	Succeeded by Samuel Walker
Military offices
Preceded by	Adjutant General of Massachusetts; 1834 - 1843	Succeeded by Henry K. Oliver
