= Jon Clarke =

Jon Clarke may refer to:

- Jon Clarke (rugby union) (born 1983), rugby union player
- Jon Clarke (rugby league) (born 1979), rugby league player
- Jonty Clarke (Jonathan Clarke, born 1981), English field hockey player
- Jonathan Clarke (cyclist) (born 1984), Australian cyclist
- Jono Clarke (1944–2020), Rhodesian cricketer

== See also ==
- J. C. D. Clark (Jonathan Clark, born 1951), British historian
- Jonathan Clark Rogers (1885–1967), academic
- John Clarke (disambiguation)
