= Linus B. Comins =

American politician (1817–1892)

Linus Bacon Comins
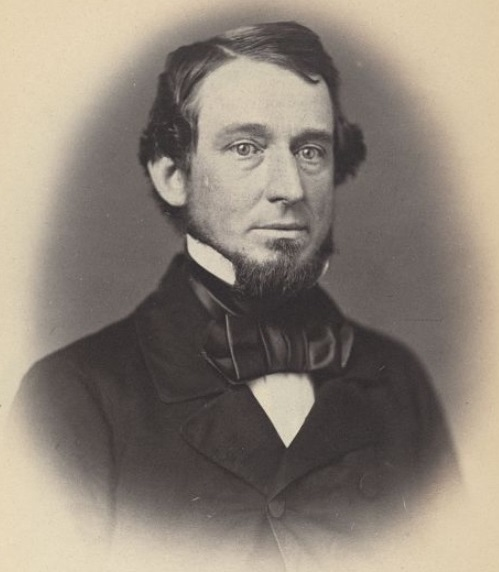

Member of the U.S. House of Representatives from Massachusetts's 4th district
- In office March 4, 1855 – March 3, 1859
- Preceded by: Samuel H. Walley
- Succeeded by: Alexander H. Rice

4th Mayor of Roxbury, Massachusetts
- In office 1854–1854
- Preceded by: Samuel Walker
- Succeeded by: James Ritchie

City of Roxbury, Massachusetts, President of the Common Council
- In office 1847–1848
- Preceded by: Francis G. Shaw
- Succeeded by: William A. Crafts

City of Roxbury, Massachusetts, Member of the Common Council Ward 5
- In office 1846–1848
- Preceded by: None
- Succeeded by: Aaron D. Williams Jr.

Personal details
- Born: November 29, 1817 Charlton, Massachusetts
- Died: October 14, 1892 (aged 75) Jamaica Plain, Massachusetts
- Resting place: Forest Hills Cemetery, Boston, Massachusetts
- Party: American Party, Republican
- Spouse: Mary Barker

Linus Bacon Comins (November 29, 1817 – October 14, 1892) was a Massachusetts politician who served as Mayor of Roxbury, Massachusetts and as a member of the United States House of Representatives from Massachusetts from 1855 to 1859.

== Early life ==
Comins, the son of Mary (Bacon) Comins and Barnabus C. Comins, was born in Charlton, Massachusetts.

Comins attended the common schools at Brookfield, Massachusetts and was graduated from Worcester County Manual Training High School. He engaged in manufacturing in Roxbury, Massachusetts.

== Political career ==
Comins was a member of the Roxbury city council from 1846 to 1848 and served as its president in 1847 and 1848. He was the Mayor of Roxbury in 1854. He was elected as a candidate of the American Party to the Thirty-fourth Congress, March 4, 1855 - March 3, 1857, and as a Republican to the Thirty-fifth Congress (March 4, 1857 – March 3, 1859).

== Retirement ==
After leaving Congress, he resumed manufacturing pursuits. He was a delegate to the Republican National Convention, 1860.

== Death and burial ==
Comins died in Jamaica Plain, Massachusetts, October 14, 1892, and was interred at Forest Hills Cemetery in Jamaica Plain.

== Bibliography ==
- A Catalogue of the City Councils of Boston, 1822-1908, Roxbury, 1846-1867, Charlestown 1847-1873 and of The Selectmen of Boston, 1634-1822 also of Various Other Town and Municipal officers, Boston, MA: City of Boston Printing Department, (1909) pp. 328–329.
- Thwing, Walter Eliot (1908), History of the First Church in Roxbury, Massachusetts, 1630-1904, Boston, MA: W.A. Butterfield, (1908) p. 331.

U.S. House of Representatives
Preceded by Samuel H. Walley	Member of the U.S. House of Representatives from Massachusetts's 4th congressional district March 4, 1855 – March 3, 1859	Succeeded by Alexander H. Rice
Political offices
Preceded by Samuel Walker	Mayor of Roxbury, Massachusetts; 1854	Succeeded by James Ritchie
Preceded by Francis G. Shaw	President of the Roxbury, Massachusetts; Common Council; 1847-1848	Succeeded by William A. Crafts
