= John Clarke (museum curator) =

British museum curator (1954–2020)

John Clarke (1954–2020) was a British specialist in Ladakhi and Tibetan metalwork. He was curator of Himalayan and Southeast Asian Art at the Victoria and Albert Museum.

== Career ==
After joining the V&A in 1979, Clarke visited Ladakh, Dharamsala, Nepal, Tibet and Bhutan between 1986 and 1991. He did a PhD, “A Regional Survey and Stylistic Analysis of Tibetan Non-Sculptural Metalworking, c. 1850-1959”, at the School of Oriental and African Studies, London, in which he combined field research, a close examination of metalwork in European museums and Western travellers' accounts since the 19th century. He was the Lead Curator for the Robert H. N. Ho Family Foundation Buddhist Art Galleries, which opened at the V&A in 2009. He was also a visiting professor at the University of Northumbria.

== Publications ==
- 1989 "Chiling, a Village of Ladakhi Craftsmen and their Products", Arts of Asia 19/3, pp. 128–141.
- 1992 "A Group of Sino-Mongolian Metalwork in the Tibetan Style", Orientations 23/5, pp. 65–75.
- 1995 "Survey of Metalworking in Ladakh", in Henry Osmaston and Philip Denwood (eds.), Recent Research on Ladakh 4 & 5 (London: School of Oriental and African Studies; Delhi: Motilal Banarsidass), pp. 9–17.
- 1995 "Regional Survey and Stylistic Analysis of Tibetan Non-Sculptural Metalworking, c.1850-1959" 2 vols. PhD dissertation. London: School of Oriental and African Studies
- 1997 Tibet, Caught in Time. Reading: Garnet Publishing Ltd.
- 1997 "Regional Styles of Metalworking", in Jane Singer and Philip Denwood (eds.), Tibetan Art, Towards a Definition of Style (London: Calman and King), pp. 278–289.
- 1998 "Hindu Trading Pilgrims", in Alex McKay (ed.) Pilgrimage in Tibet (Richmond: Curzon), pp. 5 52–70.
- 1999 "The Tibetanisation of European Steel Stoves in Ladakh", in Martijn van Beek, Kristoffer Brix Bertelsen and Poul Pedersen (eds), Ladakh: Culture, History and Development, between Himalaya and Karakoram. Recent Research on Ladakh 8 (Aarhus: Aarhus University Press), pp. 58–71.
- 2001 "Ga’u–The Tibetan Amulet Box", Arts of Asia 31/3, pp. 45–67.
- 2002 "Metalworking in dBus and gTsang, 1930-1977", Tibet Journal 27/1-2, pp. 113–152.
- 2004 Jewellery of Tibet and the Himalayas (London: Victoria and Albert Museum).
- 2005 "Metalworking in Ladakh", in Monisha Ahmed and Clare Harris (eds.), Ladakh Culture at the Crossroads (Bombay: Marg), pp. 44–55.
- 2006 "A History of Ironworking in Tibet: Centers of Production, Styles, and Techniques", in Donald J. La Rocca (ed.), Warriors of the Himalayas. Rediscovering the Arms and Armor of Tibet (New Haven and London: Yale University Press) pp. 21–33.
- 2011 "Non-sculptural Metalworking in Eastern Tibet 1930-2003", in Erberto Lo Bue (ed.), Art in Tibet, Issues in Traditional Tibetan Art from the Seventh to the Twentieth Century Proceedings of the 10th seminar of the International Association for Tibetan Studies (Leiden: Brill), pp. 171–182.
- 2013 "A New Image of the Mahasiddha Virupa: a Major Addition to the Corpus of early Fifteenth-century Bronzes", in David Park, Kuenga Wangmo and Sharon Cather (eds.), Art of Merit. Studies in Buddhist Art and its Conservation: Proceedings of the Buddhist Art Forum 2012 (London: Archetype Publications), pp. 241–250.
- 2017 "The New Robert H. N. Ho Family Foundation Galleries of Buddhist Art at the Victoria and Albert Museum", Orientations 48/5.
- 2019 "Introduction to Papers on Buddhist Sculpture Given at, or Arising from, the Buddhist Sculpture Symposium Held at the Victoria and Albert Museum in 2010", in J. A. Lerner and A.L. Juliano (eds), Inner and Central Asian Art and Archaeology 2, 127–132. Special edition on New Research on Central Asian, Buddhist and Far Eastern Art and Archaeology (Turnhout: Brepols).
- 2020 "On the Road Back to Mandalay: The Burmese Regalia – Seizure, Display and Return to Myanmar in 1964", in Louise Tythacott and Panggah Ardiyansyah (eds.), Returning Southeast Asia’s Past (Singapore: National University of Singapore Press).
