= Stonyhurst =

Rural estate in Lancashire, England

Coordinates: 53.846°N 2.474°W

- Location in Ribble Valley Borough Location in the Forest of Bowland Location within Lancashire
- OS grid reference: SD684379
- District: Ribble Valley
- Shire county: Lancashire
- Region: North West
- Country: England
- Sovereign state: United Kingdom
- Post town: CLITHEROE
- Police: Lancashire
- Fire: Lancashire
- Ambulance: North West

Stonyhurst is a 1,000-acre (4 km^{2}) rural estate owned by the Society of Jesus near Clitheroe in Lancashire, England. It is centred on Stonyhurst College, occupying the great house, its preparatory school Stonyhurst Saint Mary's Hall and the parish church, St Peter's.

== The Estate ==
The grounds are bounded by the River Hodder, the village of Hurst Green and Longridge Fell. The Forest of Bowland Area of Outstanding Natural Beauty overlaps in places.

The earliest deed for the estate dates back to 1200 A.D. when it was known as the "Stanihurst". It passed through the Bayley family to their descendants, the Shireburns ("Sherburnes" etc), before passing into the hands of Thomas Weld (of Lulworth). Already possessing a large estate, he donated it to the Jesuits in 1794 as a new home for their school, of which he was an old boy when it was located at Liège. A junior branch of the Sherburnes, who had earlier fled to Oxford to build and dwell in Beam Hall, subsequently emigrated to New England, where they contributed in various ways to the early history of the United States; these descendants included Henry Sherburne and John Sherburne.

== Buildings ==
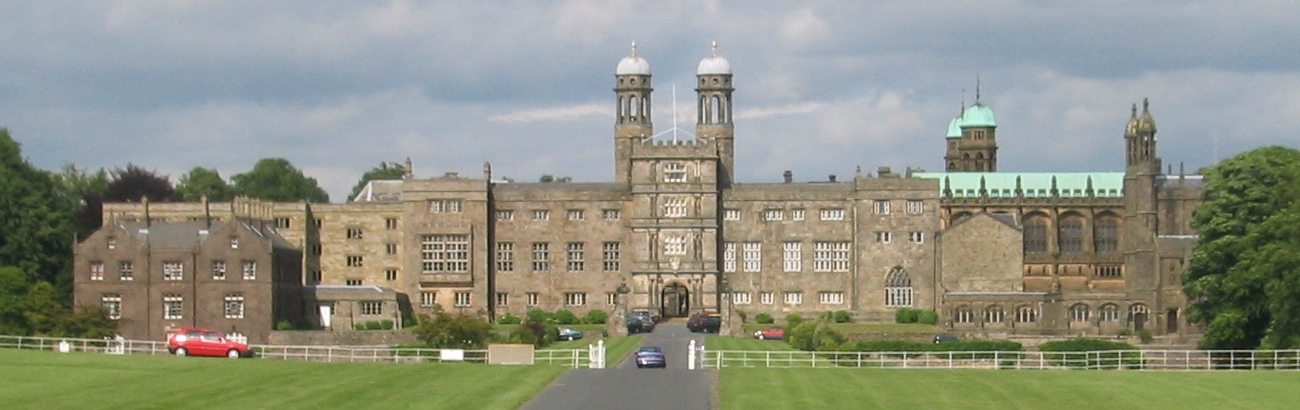
Stonyhurst College

Stonyhurst College and Stonyhurst Saint Mary's Hall are Jesuit boarding schools with approximately 800 pupils in total, most of whom are boarders. The schools are connected by parallel footpaths through the woods, known as Brothers' Walk. The name derives from the fact that before the schools became co-educational, pupils from the college would take the route to visit their younger brothers at Saint Mary's Hall although the term could originate from when St Mary's Hall operated as a seminary for trainee Jesuits. They walked along the path reciting the Spiritual Exercises of St Ignatius. A number of teachers and Jesuit priests work and live on the site. Adjacent to the school buildings are workshops employing masons and craftsmen working on the maintenance and restoration of the buildings. There is a large mill which was once a granary but is currently used as a sawmill.

The Church of St Peter is the parish church for the neighbouring village of Hurst Green. The Stonyhurst Observatory began operations in 1838, transferring to a new building in 1866. The records of temperature taken there are the oldest continual daily records in the world. Today, the observatory is one of four used by the Met Office to provide temperature data for central England.

The estate contains the two hamlets of Stockbridge and Woodfields, both of which are inhabited by teachers from Stonyhurst College. Hodder Place, the former site of the preparatory school is now divided into residential flats which are privately owned; the grounds remain part of the estate. Richard Sherburne built an almshouse on Longridge Fell, the predecessor of the Sherburne Almshouse, which his son Sir Nicholas built in circa 1707. The latter was dismantled in 1946 and re-erected in Hurst Green.

== Monuments ==
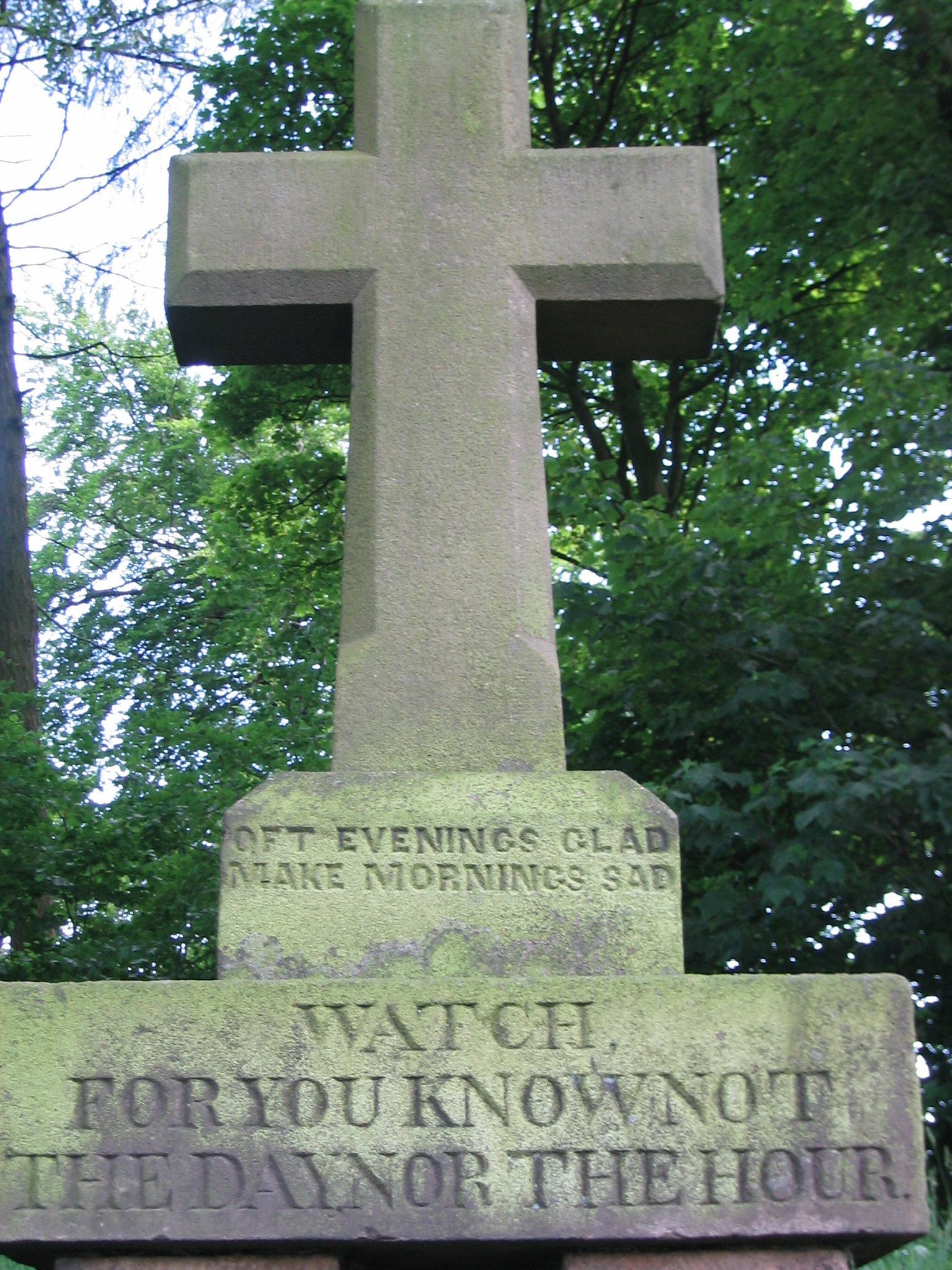
The Pinfold Cross

Religious monuments in the area are a reminder of the Jesuit presence and strength of Catholicism in the locality. Most notably, the Lady Statue at the top of the Avenue connecting Stonyhurst College with Hurst Green. It was erected in 1882, and is inscribed with the words "Ave Maria".

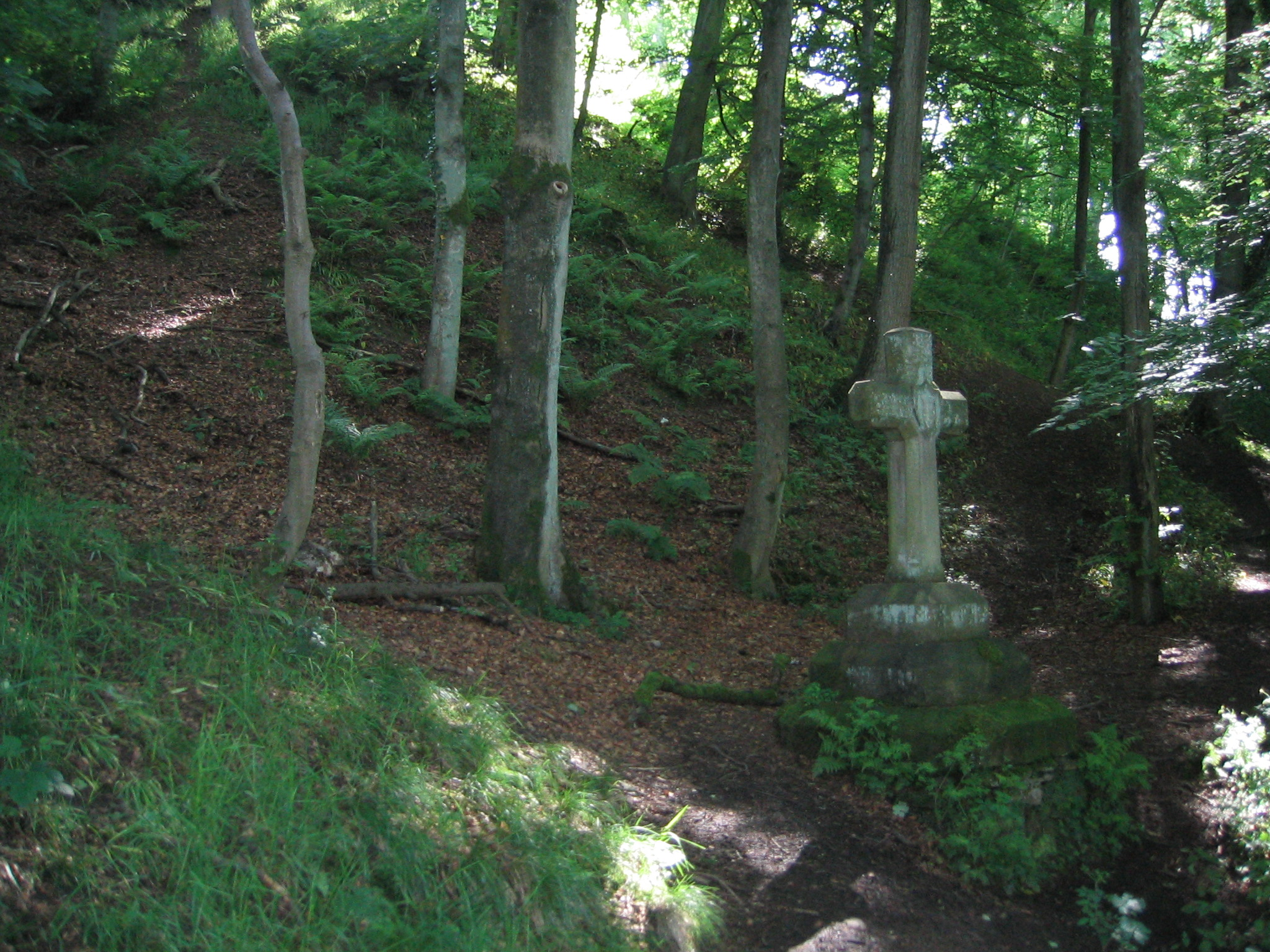
Hague's Cross

Cromwell's rock is situated at the top of the Avenue, near St Peter's church graveyard. According to tradition, Cromwell stood on this inconspicuous stone and described the mansion ahead of him as "the finest half-house in England" (the symmetry of the building was, at that time, incomplete).

The grounds of St Mary's Hall contain a Marian grotto and a statue of the Sacred Heart.

Four old crosses stand at disparate locations around the estate:

- The Pinfold Cross is a memorial to a former servant at Stonyhurst College and fiddler, James Wells, who fell to his death in a quarry nearby on 12 February 1834. It was erected in 1834 at Stockbridge. On the front is inscribed the legend, ‘WATCH FOR YOU KNOW NOT THE DAY NOR HOUR.' Above this is written, ‘OFT EVENINGS GLAD MAKE MORNINGS SAD'. On the left is ‘PRAY FOR THE SOUL OF JAMES WELLS' and on the right, ‘DIED FEB. 12TH, 1834'.
- Saint Paulinus' Cross stands at Kemple End and is a listed monument believed to date from Anglo-Saxon times. It may well mark a spot at which Saint Paulinus of York, who converted King Edwin of Northumbria and founded the See of York, preached.
- Hague’s Cross stands above the River Hodder in the woods close to the former Jesuit novitiate and preparatory school, Hodder Place. This commemorates the death of William Hague, who drowned in the Hodder here (the old Stonyhurst bathing huts are located in Hodder Wood), on the 5th of April, 1877.
- Woodward's Cross is a bit to the south of Hague's Cross. The Jesuit student James Woodward drowned in the River Hodder on the 31st of July, 1857.

Pupils from the school used to visit each cross in an annual pilgrimage to mark Palm Sunday.

== Tourism ==
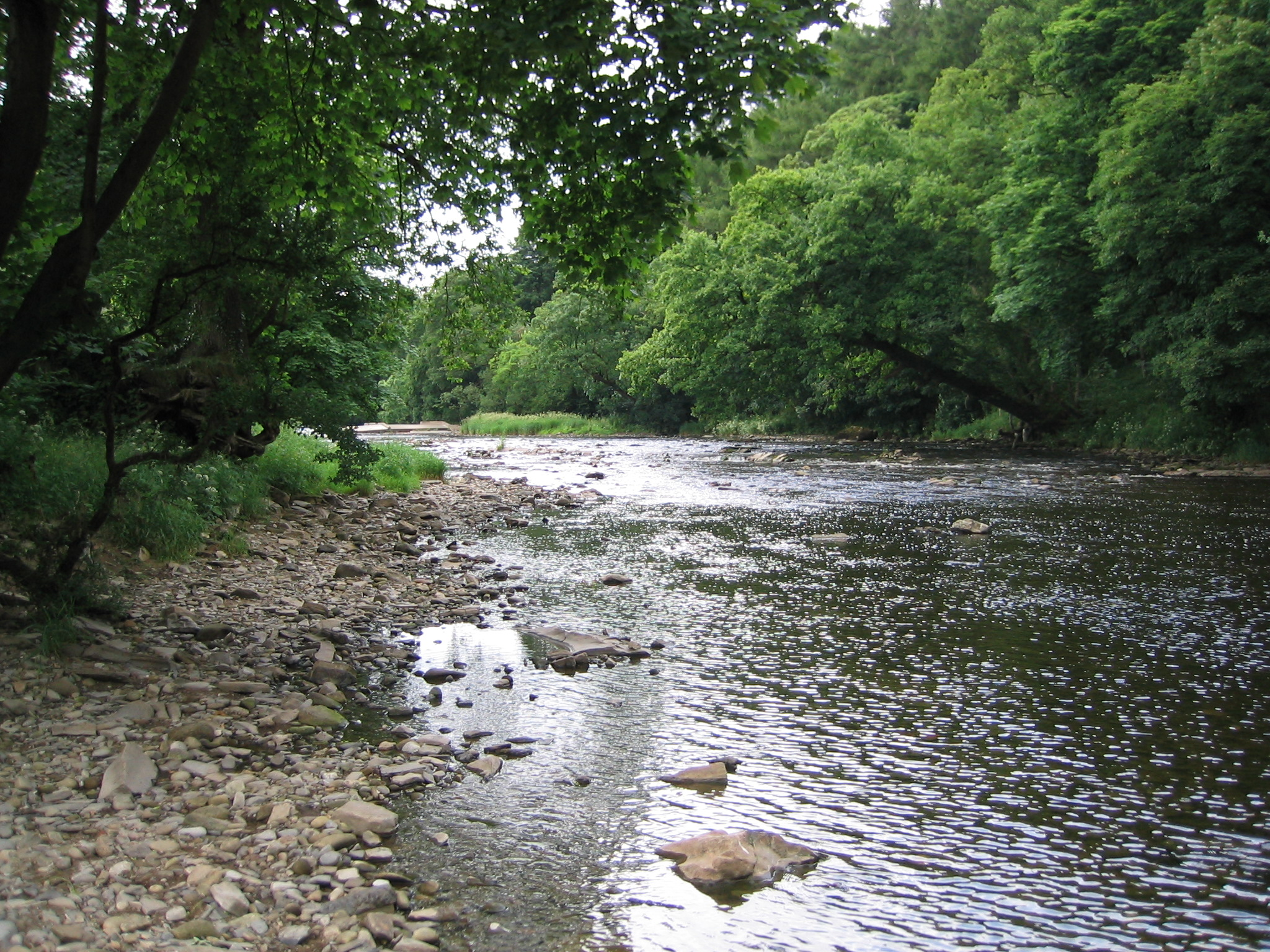
The Estate boundary at the River Hodder

The estate is a tourist attraction. Many visitors come to view the grade one listed Stonyhurst College, which is open for tours during the summer. The gardens of the college are also open to visitors and include a small shop in the meteorological station. The area is also criss-crossed with public footpaths, in particular the Tolkien Trail, a walk around some of the areas thought to have inspired the author during his stay at the college in the late 1940s.

Public events hosted on the estate include the Great British Food Festival and the Ribble Valley International Piano Week. Other visitors come to make use of the extensive sports facilities, including a golf course, swimming pool and astroturf hockey pitch.

== See also ==
- Hodder Place
- Hurst Green
- Lancashire
- Forest of Bowland
