= Jonathan Clark =

Jonathan Clark may refer to:

- Jonathan Clark (cricketer) (born 1981), South African cricketer
- Jonathan Clark (soldier) (1750–1811), U.S. general, older brother of George Rogers Clark and William Clark
- Jonathan Clark (footballer) (born 1958), Welsh footballer
- J. C. D. Clark (born 1951), British historian
- Jonathan Clark of the Clark baronets
- Jonathan Clark (bishop) (born 1961), Church of England bishop
- Jonathan Clark (TV personality)
- Jonathan Clark, professional dunker, All-American track athlete and educator

== See also ==
- Jon Clark (disambiguation)
- John Clark (disambiguation)
