= Jack Clarke =

Jack Clarke may refer to:

- Jack Clarke (athlete) (fl. 1945–1952), New Zealand marathon runner
- Jack Clarke (footballer, born 1931) (1931–1997), Australian rules footballer and Essendon player
- Jack Clarke (footballer, born 1933) (1933–2001), Australian rules footballer and East Fremantle player
- Jack Clarke (footballer, born 2000), English footballer
- Jack Clarke (racing driver) (born 1988), racing driver in the FIA Formula Two Championship
- Jack Clarke (rugby union) (born 1968), Irish rugby union player

== See also ==
- Jack Clark (disambiguation)
- Jackie Clarke (disambiguation)
- John Clarke (disambiguation)
