= James Ritchie (Massachusetts politician) =

American politician (1815–1873)

5th Mayor of Roxbury, Massachusetts
- In office 1855–1855
- Preceded by: Linus Bacon Comins
- Succeeded by: John Sherburne Sleeper

Member Massachusetts Governor's Council

Personal details
- Born: May 12, 1815 Canton, Massachusetts
- Died: March 16, 1873 (aged 57) Atlantic Ocean off the coast of Duxbury, Massachusetts
- Spouse(s): Caroline Whitaker (Married April 1837; d. 1841), Mary Jane Kimball b. October 19, 1817.
- Children: James Ritchie Jr.
- Education: Harvard
- Profession: Teacher

James Ritchie (May 12, 1815 - March 16, 1873) was an American teacher and politician, who served as the fifth Mayor of Roxbury, Massachusetts in 1855, and as a member of the Massachusetts Governor's Council.

== Death ==
Ritchie drowned in the sinking of the steamboat Grace Darling off Duxbury, Massachusetts. His body was never found.

== Bibliography ==
- History of the First Church in Roxbury, Massachusetts, 1630-1904 By Walter Eliot Thwing (1908).
- Memorials of the Class of 1835, Harvard University: Prepared on Behalf of the Class Secretary by Harvard College Class of 1835 (1886).
- The Memorial History of Boston: Including Suffolk County, Massachusetts. 1630-1880. Justin Winsor (1881).

Political offices
Preceded by Linus Bacon Comins	Mayor of Roxbury, Massachusetts; 1861-1853	Succeeded by John Sherburne Sleeper
