= List of mayors of Roxbury, Massachusetts =

The Mayor of Roxbury was the head of the municipal government in Roxbury, Massachusetts. There was no Mayor of Roxbury until 1846 because up to that point Roxbury was still incorporated as a town. When Roxbury was annexed by the City of Boston in 1868, the position was abolished.

== List of mayors ==
No.	Image	Mayor	Term	Party
1		John Jones Clarke	1846	None
2		Henry A. S. Dearborn	1847–1851	None
3		Samuel Walker	1851–1853	None
4		Linus Bacon Comins	1854	American Party
5		James Ritchie	1855–1855	None
6		John Sherburne Sleeper	1856–1858	None
7		Theodore Otis	1859–1860	None
8		William Gaston	1861–1862	Democratic
9		George Lewis	January 5, 1863 – January 5, 1868	None

== See also ==
- List of mayors of Boston, Massachusetts (Most current mayors)
