= 1834 Massachusetts gubernatorial election =

- November 10, 1834
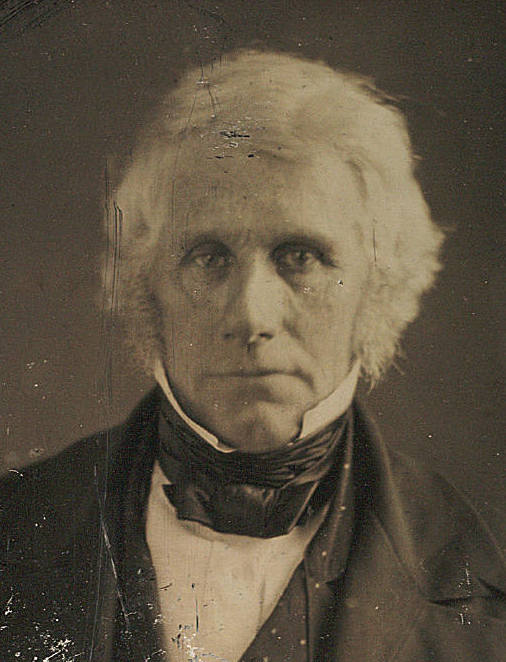

Nominee	John Davis	Marcus Morton	John Bailey
Party	Whig	Democratic	Anti-Masonic
Popular vote	43,757	18,683	10,160
Percentage	58.05%	24.79%	13.48%
- County results Davis: 40–50% 50–60% 60–70% >90%
Governor before election
John Davis
Whig
Elected Governor
John Davis
Whig

The 1834 Massachusetts gubernatorial election was held on November 10.

Whig Governor John Davis was re-elected to a second term in office over Democrat Marcus Morton and Anti-Mason John Bailey.

== Nominations ==
=== Anti-Masonic ===
Although some had hoped for an alliance between the Anti-Masons and the National Republicans after John Quincy Adams had stepped aside for John Davis in the 1833 election, this was not to be. Many Anti-Masons remained dissatisfied with Davis's performance as governor and the newly christened Whig Party in general, particularly in their handling of political appointments along partisan lines.

On August 14, a conference was called at the home of George Odiorne between John Quincy Adams and Henry Dana Ward of New York. The three men debated the subject of the gubernatorial race, with Odiorne objecting to the nomination of Governor Davis and suggesting John Bailey, Heman Lincoln, Samuel Lathrop, or Marcus Morton. Adams countered that Worcester would back Davis, and so the choice was between Davis or Morton. Adams began to suspect the effort to fuse the Anti-Masons with Morton was a prelude to an attempt to throw Anti-Mason votes to Martin Van Buren in the 1836 presidential election.

Marcus Morton also began to organize an attempt at fusion himself, sounding out Democratic and Anti-Masonic leadership in an effort to overthrow the Whigs. Radical Anti-Masons like Benjamin F. Hallett supported this move, leading moderates like Pliny Merrick to appeal to Davis directly to denounce Masonry and avoid a union with the Democrats.

Ultimately, the Anti-Masons did not ally directly with the Jacksonian Morton or Whig Davis. At the September state convention, with both John Quincy Adams and Edward Everett declining the party's support, the Anti-Masons nominated John Bailey, an ally of Adams in the State Senate.

=== Democratic ===
The Democratic Party was certain to nominate Marcus Morton for the tenth consecutive election and did so at its convention in September.

=== Working Men's ===
The Working Men's Party met at a convention in Northampton during October and nominated Samuel Allen again. There were fourteen delegates to the convention.

== General election ==
=== Candidates ===
- Samuel Allen (Working Men's)
- John Bailey, state senator and former U.S. representative from Dorchester (Anti-Masonic)
- John Davis, incumbent governor (Whig)
- Marcus Morton, former acting governor and nominee since 1828 (Democratic)

=== Campaign ===
A major issue in the campaign was the arson of the Charlestown Ursuline convent in August, which some attributed to the presence of the preacher Lyman Beecher in the state. The arson and anti-Catholic riots brought sectarian and immigration issues to the fore during the summer months.

=== Results ===
The election brought about the demise of the Anti-Masons, as Bailey failed to come close to Adams's 1833 support. Support for Samuel Allen also declined. However, both Davis and Morton increased their raw vote totals from 1833. Increasing focus on the issue of the bank divided the state between the two major parties with declared stances on the issue: the pro-Bank Whigs and the anti-Bank Democrats.

1834 Massachusetts gubernatorial election
Party	Candidate	Votes	%	±%
Whig	John Davis (incumbent)	37,555	58.05%	▲17.94
Democratic	Marcus Morton	18,683	24.79%	▲0.08
Anti-Masonic	John Bailey	10,160	13.48%	▼15.66
Working Men's	Samuel L. Allen	2,580	3.42%	▼2.10
Write-in		220	0.34%	▼0.18
Total votes		69,198	100.00%	

== See also ==
- 1834 Massachusetts legislature
