= Massachusetts's 10th congressional district =

Former U.S. House district from 1795 to 2013

Coordinates: 41.7200°N 70.2500°W

- Obsolete district
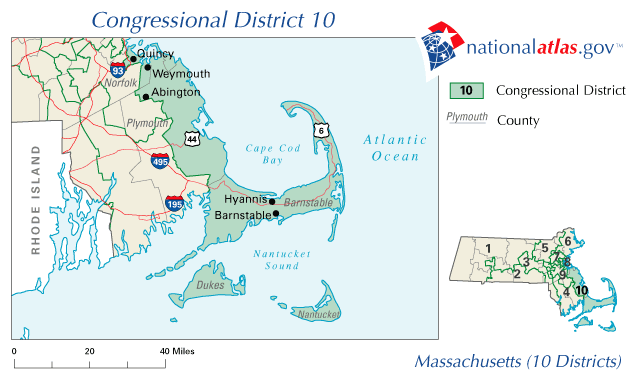
- Created: 1795
- Eliminated: 2010
- Years active: 1795–2013

Massachusetts's current districts, since 2013

Massachusetts's 10th congressional district is an obsolete district that was active during 1795–2013. It was first located in the District of Maine during 1795–1803, then located in several different areas of Massachusetts. It was most recently eliminated in 2013 as district lines were redrawn to accommodate the loss of the seat due to reapportionment as a result of the 2010 census.

At the time the district was eliminated, it included parts of the South Shore and all of the Cape and Islands. Effective with the 2012 House elections, most of the former district was placed in the 9th district, with some northern portions placed in the 8th district.

Notable persons elected to the U.S. House of Representatives from the 10th congressional district include James Michael Curley, four-time mayor of Boston, and John F. Fitzgerald, maternal grandfather of John F. Kennedy.

== Cities and towns in the district prior to 2013 ==
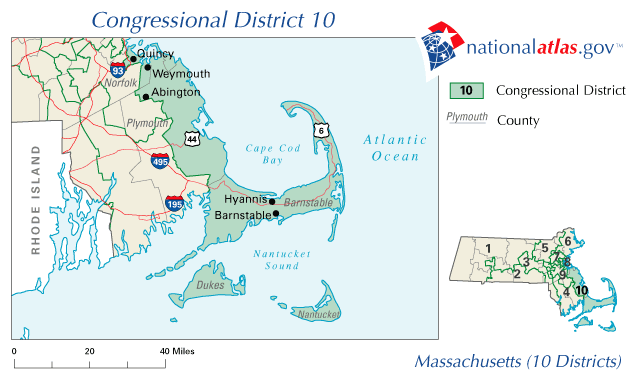
The district from 2003 to 2013

=== 1840s ===
1843: "The Counties of Barnstable, Dukes, and Nantucket, together with the towns of Rochester and Wareham, in the County of Plymouth, and of Dartmouth, Fairhaven, and New Bedford, in the County of Bristol."

=== 1860s ===
1869: "Berkshire and Hampden counties."

=== 1890s–1950s ===
1893: Boston, Wards 13, 14, 15, 19 (Precincts 1, 5, 7, 8, 9), 20, 22, 24; Milton, Quincy.

1916: Boston, Wards 1, 2, 3, 4, 5, 6, 7, 8, 9, 11 (Precincts 1, 2).

1921: Boston, Wards 1, 2, 3, 4, 5, 6.

1934: Boston, Wards 4, 5, 9, 10, 11, 12, 19, 20, 21.

1941–1953: Boston, Wards 4, 5, 10, 12, 19, 20, 21; Brookline, Newton.

=== 1960s–1970s ===
1963: "Bristol County: Cities of Attleboro, Fall River, and Taunton. Towns of Berkley, Dighton, Easton, Freetown, Mansfield, North Attleboro, Norton, Raynham, Rehoboth, Seekonk, Somerset, and Swansea. Middlesex County: City of Newton. Norfolk County: Towns of Dover, Foxborough, Medfield, Needham, Norfolk, Plainville, Walpole, Wellesley, Westwood, and Wrentham."

1977: "Bristol County: Cities of Attleboro, Fall River, and Taunton. Towns of Berkley, Dighton, Easton, Freetown, Mansfield, North Attleborough, Norton, Raynham, Rehoboth, Seekonk, Somerset, Swansea, and Westport. Middlesex County: Towns of Natick and Sherborn. Norfolk County: Towns of Foxborough, Medfield, Millis, Norfolk, Plainville, Sharon, Wellesley, and Wrentham. Plymouth County: Towns of Bridgewater, East Bridgewater, Halifax, Hanson, Lakeville, Middleborough, and West Bridgewater."

=== 1990s ===
1997: "Counties: Barnstable, Dukes, Nantucket, Norfolk (part), and Plymouth (part)."

=== 2003–2013 ===
- All of Barnstable County, Dukes County, Nantucket County,
- The following municipalities in Plymouth County: Abington, Carver, Duxbury, Hanover, Hanson Pct. 2, Hingham, Hull, Kingston, Marshfield, Norwell, Pembroke, Plymouth, Plympton, Rockland, Scituate, and
- The following municipalities in Norfolk County: Cohasset, Quincy, Weymouth

== List of members representing the district ==
| Representative | Party | Years | Cong ress | Electoral history | District location |
|---|---|---|---|---|---|
District created March 4, 1795
| Benjamin Goodhue (Salem) | Federalist | March 4, 1795 – June 11, 1796 | 4th | Redistricted from the 1st district and re-elected in 1794. Resigned when elected U.S. Senator. | 1795–1803 "3rd Middle district" |
| Vacant | | June 11, 1796 – December 7, 1796 | 4th | | 1795–1803 "3rd Middle district" |
| Samuel Sewall (Marblehead) | Federalist | December 7, 1796 – January 10, 1800 | 4th 5th 6th | Elected on the second ballot to finish Goodhue's term. Re-elected in 1796. Re-elected in 1798. Resigned to become Justice of the Massachusetts Supreme Judicial Court. | 1795–1803 "3rd Middle district" |
| Vacant | | January 10, 1800 – November 25, 1800 | 6th | | 1795–1803 "3rd Middle district" |
| Nathan Read (Salem) | Federalist | November 25, 1800 – March 3, 1803 | 6th 7th | Elected October 20, 1800, on the second ballot to finish Sewall's term. Re-elected November 3, 1800. Retired. | 1795–1803 "3rd Middle district" |
| Seth Hastings (Mendon) | Federalist | March 4, 1803 – March 3, 1807 | 8th 9th | Redistricted from the 4th district and re-elected in 1802. Re-elected in 1804. Retired. | 1803–1815 "Worcester South district" |
| Jabez Upham (Brookfield) | Federalist | March 4, 1807 – 1810 | 10th 11th | Elected in 1806. Re-elected in 1808. Resigned. | 1803–1815 "Worcester South district" |
| Vacant | | 1810 – October 8, 1810 | 11th | | 1803–1815 "Worcester South district" |
| Joseph Allen (Worcester) | Federalist | October 8, 1810 – March 3, 1811 | 11th | Elected October 8, 1810, to finish Upham's term. Retired. | 1803–1815 "Worcester South district" |
| Elijah Brigham (Westborough) | Federalist | March 4, 1811 – March 3, 1815 | 12th 13th | Elected in 1810. Re-elected in 1812. Redistricted to the 11th district. | 1803–1815 "Worcester South district" |
| Laban Wheaton (Easton) | Federalist | March 4, 1815 – March 3, 1817 | 14th | Redistricted from the 9th district and re-elected in 1815. Retired. | 1815–1823 "Bristol district" |
| Marcus Morton (Taunton) | Democratic- Republican | March 4, 1817 – March 3, 1821 | 15th 16th | Elected in 1816. Re-elected in 1818. Lost re-election. | 1815–1823 "Bristol district" |
| Francis Baylies (Taunton) | Federalist | March 4, 1821 – March 3, 1823 | 17th | Elected in 1820. Redistricted to the 12th district. | 1815–1823 "Bristol district" |
| Vacant | | March 3, 1823 – December 13, 1823 | 18th | William Eustis was redistricted from the 13th district and re-elected in 1822, but declined the election to become Governor of Massachusetts. | 1823–1833 "Norfolk district" |
| John Bailey (Canton) | Adams–Clay Democratic-Republican | December 13, 1823 – March 18, 1824 | 18th | Elected in 1823 to finish Eustis's term, but election was contested on residency requirements. A March 18, 1824, House resolution on declared he was not entitled to the seat. | 1823–1833 "Norfolk district" |
| Vacant | | March 18, 1824 – December 13, 1824 | 18th | | 1823–1833 "Norfolk district" |
| John Bailey (Milton) | Adams–Clay Democratic-Republican | December 13, 1824 – March 3, 1825 | 18th 19th 20th 21st | Re-elected November 29, 1824, on the third ballot to finish Eustis's term and seated December 13, 1824. Re-elected in 1825 on the second ballot. Re-elected in 1826. Re-elected in 1828. Retired. | 1823–1833 "Norfolk district" |
| John Bailey (Milton) | Anti-Jacksonian | March 4, 1825 – March 3, 1831 | 18th 19th 20th 21st | Re-elected November 29, 1824, on the third ballot to finish Eustis's term and seated December 13, 1824. Re-elected in 1825 on the second ballot. Re-elected in 1826. Re-elected in 1828. Retired. | 1823–1833 "Norfolk district" |
| Henry A. S. Dearborn (Brookline) | Anti-Jacksonian | March 4, 1831 – March 3, 1833 | 22nd | Elected in 1830. Lost re-election. | 1823–1833 "Norfolk district" |
| William Baylies (West Bridgewater) | Anti-Jacksonian | March 4, 1833 – March 3, 1835 | 23rd | Elected in 1833. Lost re-election. | 1833–1843 [data missing] |
| Nathaniel B. Borden (Fall River) | Jacksonian | March 4, 1835 – March 3, 1837 | 24th 25th | Elected in 1835. Re-elected in 1836. Lost re-election as a Whig. | 1833–1843 [data missing] |
| Nathaniel B. Borden (Fall River) | Democratic | March 4, 1837 – March 3, 1839 | 24th 25th | Elected in 1835. Re-elected in 1836. Lost re-election as a Whig. | 1833–1843 [data missing] |
| Henry Williams (Taunton) | Democratic | March 4, 1839 – March 3, 1841 | 26th | Elected in 1838. Lost re-election. | 1833–1843 [data missing] |
| Nathaniel B. Borden (Fall River) | Whig | March 4, 1841 – March 3, 1843 | 27th | Elected on the second ballot in 1841. [data missing] | 1833–1843 [data missing] |
| Barker Burnell (Nantucket) | Whig | March 4, 1843 – June 15, 1843 | 28th | Redistricted from the 11th district and re-elected in 1842. Died. | 1843–1853 [data missing] |
| Vacant | | June 15, 1843 – December 7, 1843 | 28th | | 1843–1853 [data missing] |
| Joseph Grinnell (New Bedford) | Whig | December 7, 1843 – March 3, 1851 | 28th 29th 30th 31st | Elected to finish Burnell's term. Re-elected in 1844. Re-elected in 1846. Re-elected in 1848. [data missing] | 1843–1853 [data missing] |
| Zeno Scudder (Barnstable) | Whig | March 4, 1851 – March 3, 1853 | 32nd | Elected in 1850. Redistricted to the 1st district. | 1843–1853 [data missing] |
| Edward Dickinson (Amherst) | Whig | March 4, 1853 – March 3, 1855 | 33rd | Elected in 1852. [data missing] | 1853–1863 [data missing] |
| Calvin C. Chaffee (Springfield) | Know Nothing | March 4, 1855 – March 3, 1857 | 34th 35th | Elected in 1854. Re-elected in 1856. [data missing] | 1853–1863 [data missing] |
| Calvin C. Chaffee (Springfield) | Republican | March 4, 1857 – March 3, 1859 | 34th 35th | Elected in 1854. Re-elected in 1856. [data missing] | 1853–1863 [data missing] |
| Charles Delano (Northampton) | Republican | March 4, 1859 – March 3, 1863 | 36th 37th | Elected in 1858. Re-elected in 1860. [data missing] | 1853–1863 [data missing] |
| Henry L. Dawes (Pittsfield) | Republican | March 3, 1863 – March 3, 1873 | 38th 39th 40th 41st 42nd | Redistricted from the 11th district and re-elected in 1862. Re-elected in 1864. Re-elected in 1866. Re-elected in 1868. Re-elected in 1870. Redistricted to the 11th district. | 1863–1873 [data missing] |
| Alvah Crocker (Fitchburg) | Republican | March 4, 1873 – December 26, 1874 | 43rd | Redistricted from the 9th district and re-elected in 1872. Re-elected in 1874. Died. | 1873–1883 [data missing] |
| Vacant | | December 26, 1874 – January 27, 1875 | 43rd | | 1873–1883 [data missing] |
| Charles A. Stevens (Ware) | Republican | January 27, 1875 – March 3, 1875 | 43rd | Elected to finish Crocker's term. [data missing] | 1873–1883 [data missing] |
| Julius H. Seelye (Amherst) | Independent | March 4, 1875 – March 3, 1877 | 44th | Elected in 1874. [data missing] | 1873–1883 [data missing] |
| Amasa Norcross (Fitchburg) | Republican | March 4, 1877 – March 3, 1883 | 45th 46th 47th | Elected in 1876. Re-elected in 1878. Re-elected in 1880. [data missing] | 1873–1883 [data missing] |
| William W. Rice (Worcester) | Republican | March 4, 1883 – March 3, 1887 | 48th 49th | Redistricted from the 9th district and re-elected in 1882. Re-elected in 1884. [data missing] | 1883–1893 [data missing] |
| John E. Russell (Leicester) | Democratic | March 4, 1887 – March 3, 1889 | 50th | Elected in 1886. [data missing] | 1883–1893 [data missing] |
| Joseph H. Walker (Worcester) | Republican | March 4, 1889 – March 3, 1893 | 51st 52nd | Elected in 1888. Re-elected in 1890. Redistricted to the 3rd district. | 1883–1893 [data missing] |
| Michael J. McEttrick (Boston) | Independent Democrat | March 4, 1893 – March 3, 1895 | 53rd | Elected in 1892. [data missing] | 1893–1903 [data missing] |
| Harrison H. Atwood (Boston) | Republican | March 4, 1895 – March 3, 1897 | 54th | Elected in 1894. Lost renomination. | 1893–1903 [data missing] |
| Samuel J. Barrows (Boston) | Republican | March 4, 1897 – March 3, 1899 | 55th | Elected in 1896. [data missing] | 1893–1903 [data missing] |
| Henry F. Naphen (Boston) | Democratic | March 4, 1899 – March 3, 1903 | 56th 57th | Elected in 1898. Re-elected in 1900. [data missing] | 1893–1903 [data missing] |
| William S. McNary (Boston) | Democratic | March 4, 1903 – March 3, 1907 | 58th 59th | Elected in 1902. Re-elected in 1904. [data missing] | 1903–1913 [data missing] |
| Joseph F. O'Connell (Boston) | Democratic | March 4, 1907 – March 3, 1911 | 60th 61st | Elected in 1906. Re-elected in 1908. [data missing] | 1903–1913 [data missing] |
| James Michael Curley (Boston) | Democratic | March 4, 1911 – March 3, 1913 | 62nd | Elected in 1910. Redistricted to the 12th district. | 1903–1913 [data missing] |
| William Francis Murray (Boston) | Democratic | March 4, 1913 – September 28, 1914 | 63rd | Redistricted from the 9th district and re-elected in 1912. Resigned to become Postmaster of Boston. | 1913–1933 [data missing] |
| Vacant | | September 28, 1914 – March 3, 1915 | 63rd | | 1913–1933 [data missing] |
| Peter Tague (Boston) | Democratic | March 4, 1915 – March 3, 1919 | 64th 65th | Elected in 1914. Initially lost re-election but regained seat on appeal citing voting irregularities. Re-elected in 1916. [data missing] | 1913–1933 [data missing] |
| John F. Fitzgerald (Boston) | Democratic | March 4, 1919 – October 23, 1919 | 66th | [data missing] Lost election contest on appeal due to voting irregularities. | 1913–1933 [data missing] |
| Peter Tague (Boston) | Democratic | October 23, 1919 – March 3, 1925 | 66th 67th 68th | Successfully contested Fitzgerald's election on appeal due to voting irregularities. Re-elected in 1920. Re-elected in 1922. Lost re-election. | 1913–1933 [data missing] |
| John J. Douglass (Boston) | Democratic | March 4, 1925 – March 3, 1933 | 69th 70th 71st 72nd | Elected in 1924. Re-elected in 1926. Re-elected in 1928. Re-elected in 1930. Redistricted to the 11th district. | 1913–1933 [data missing] |
| George H. Tinkham (Boston) | Republican | March 4, 1933 – January 3, 1943 | 73rd 74th 75th 76th 77th | Redistricted from the 11th district and re-elected in 1932. Re-elected in 1934. Re-elected in 1936. Re-elected in 1938. Re-elected in 1940.. | 1933–1943 [data missing] |
| Christian Herter (Boston) | Republican | January 3, 1943 – January 3, 1953 | 78th 79th 80th 81st 82nd | Elected in 1942. Re-elected in 1944. Re-elected in 1946. Re-elected in 1948. Re-elected in 1950. Retired to run for Governor of Massachusetts. | 1943–1953 [data missing] |
| Laurence Curtis (Boston) | Republican | January 3, 1953 – January 3, 1963 | 83rd 84th 85th 86th 87th | Elected in 1952. Re-elected in 1954. Re-elected in 1956. Re-elected in 1958. Re-elected in 1960. Retired to run for U.S. Senator. | 1953–1963 [data missing] |
| Joseph W. Martin Jr. (North Attleborough) | Republican | January 3, 1963 – January 3, 1967 | 88th 89th | Redistricted from the 14th district and re-elected in 1962. Re-elected in 1964. Lost renomination. | 1963–1973 [data missing] |
| Margaret Heckler (Wellesley) | Republican | January 3, 1967 – January 3, 1983 | 90th 91st 92nd 93rd 94th 95th 96th 97th | Elected in 1966. Re-elected in 1968. Re-elected in 1970. Re-elected in 1972; Re-elected in 1974. Re-elected in 1976. Re-elected in 1978. Re-elected in 1980. Redistricted to the 4th district and lost re-election. | 1963–1973 [data missing] |
| Margaret Heckler (Wellesley) | Republican | January 3, 1967 – January 3, 1983 | 90th 91st 92nd 93rd 94th 95th 96th 97th | Elected in 1966. Re-elected in 1968. Re-elected in 1970. Re-elected in 1972; Re-elected in 1974. Re-elected in 1976. Re-elected in 1978. Re-elected in 1980. Redistricted to the 4th district and lost re-election. | 1973–1983 [data missing] |
| Gerry Studds (Cohasset) | Democratic | January 3, 1983 – January 3, 1997 | 98th 99th 100th 101st 102nd 103rd 104th | Redistricted from the 12th district and re-elected in 1982. Re-elected in 1984. Re-elected in 1986. Re-elected in 1988. Re-elected in 1990. Re-elected in 1992. Re-elected in 1994. Retired. | 1983–1993 [data missing] |
| Gerry Studds (Cohasset) | Democratic | January 3, 1983 – January 3, 1997 | 98th 99th 100th 101st 102nd 103rd 104th | Redistricted from the 12th district and re-elected in 1982. Re-elected in 1984. Re-elected in 1986. Re-elected in 1988. Re-elected in 1990. Re-elected in 1992. Re-elected in 1994. Retired. | 1993–2003 [data missing] |
| Bill Delahunt (Quincy) | Democratic | January 3, 1997 – January 3, 2011 | 105th 106th 107th 108th 109th 110th 111th | Elected in 1996. Re-elected in 1998. Re-elected in 2000. Re-elected in 2002. Re-elected in 2004. Re-elected in 2006. Re-elected in 2008. Retired. | 1993–2003 [data missing] |
| Bill Delahunt (Quincy) | Democratic | January 3, 1997 – January 3, 2011 | 105th 106th 107th 108th 109th 110th 111th | Elected in 1996. Re-elected in 1998. Re-elected in 2000. Re-elected in 2002. Re-elected in 2004. Re-elected in 2006. Re-elected in 2008. Retired. | 2003–2013 |
| Bill Keating (Quincy) | Democratic | January 3, 2011 – January 3, 2013 | 112th | Elected in 2010. Redistricted to the 9th district. | 2003–2013 |
District eliminated January 3, 2013
