= The Boston Journal =

Newspaper in Boston, Massachusetts (1833–1917)

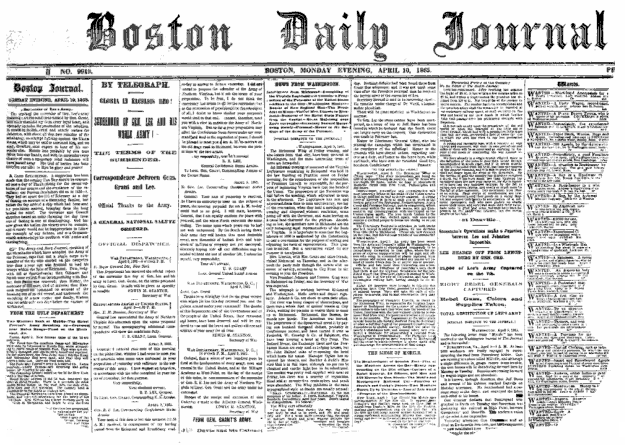
- The Boston Journal The April 10, 1865, front page of the Boston Daily Journal
- Type: Daily newspaper
- Format: Broadsheet
- Owner(s): Ford & Damrell (1833–1841); John Sherburne Sleeper, John A. Dix, Henry Rogers (1841–1845); Sleeper and Rogers (1845–1854); Henry Rogers & Charles O. Rogers (1854–1855); Charles O. Rogers (1855–1869); Estate of Charles O. Rogers (1869–1896); William D. Sohler (1896–1899); Stephen O'Meara (1899–1902); Frank Munsey (1902–1913); Matthew Hale (1913–1914); Walton A. Greene, Frederick Enwright, & Hugh Cabot (1914–1917); Charles Eliot Ware Jr. (1917); James H. Higgins (1917)
- Publisher: Journal Newspaper Company
- Founded: February 5, 1833
- Ceased publication: October 1917 (merged with the Boston Herald)
- Language: English
- Headquarters: 264 Washington Street, Boston, Massachusetts United States
- Price: $6.00 per annum, 2 cents per copy

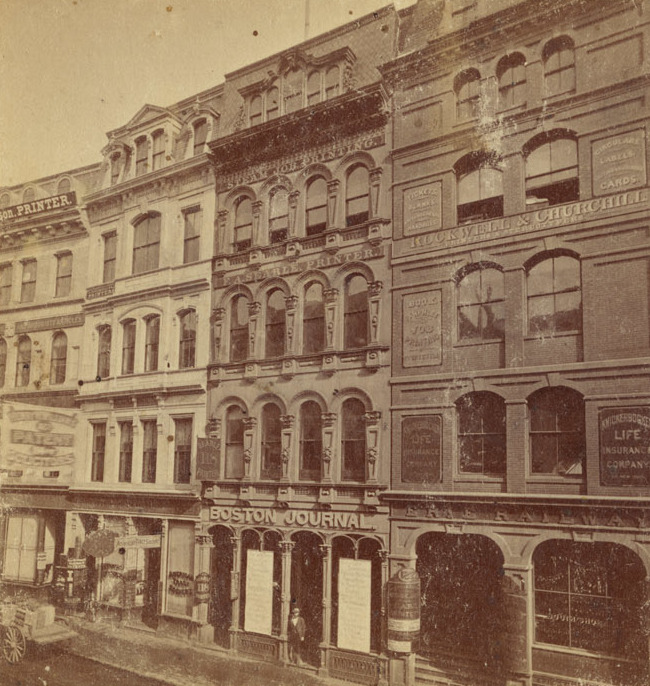
Boston Journal Office in the late 1800s

The Boston Journal was a daily newspaper published in Boston, Massachusetts, from 1833 until October 1917 when it was merged with the Boston Herald.

The paper was originally an evening paper called the Evening Mercantile Journal. When it started publishing its morning edition, it changed its name to The Boston Journal.

In October 1917, John H. Higgins, the publisher and treasurer of the Boston Herald, bought out its nearby neighbor The Boston Journal and created The Boston Herald and Boston Journal.

== Former contributors ==
- Charles Carleton Coffin, war correspondent who wrote dispatches from the front under the byline "Carlton".
- Stephen O'Meara, reporter (1874–1879), city editor (1879–1881), managing editor (1881–1895), general manager (1891–1895), editor-in-chief and publisher (1895–1899), and majority owner (1899–1902). Later served as the first commissioner of the Boston Police Department.
- Thomas Freeman Porter
- Benjamin Perley Poore, Washington correspondent and war correspondent who wrote under the byline "Perley".
- John Sherburne Sleeper, principal editor and part owner of the newspaper. Sleeper wrote the Journal's "Tales of the Seas" under his nom de plume of Hawser Martingale.

== Images ==
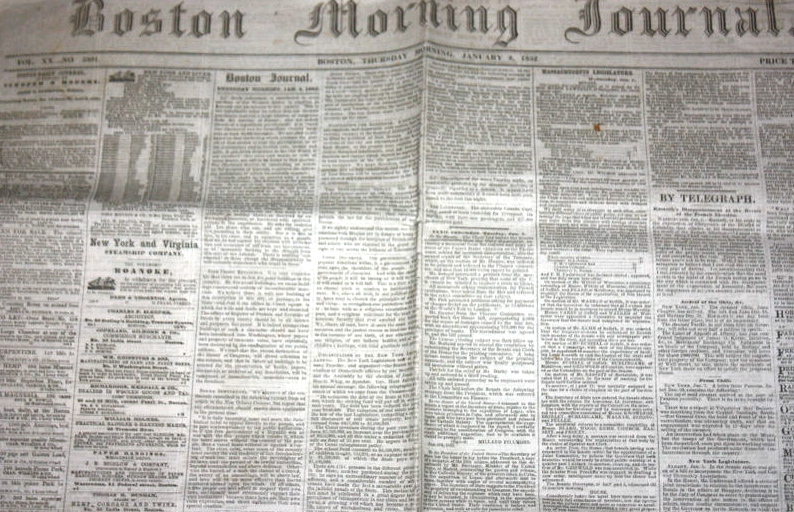
Boston Morning Journal, 1852

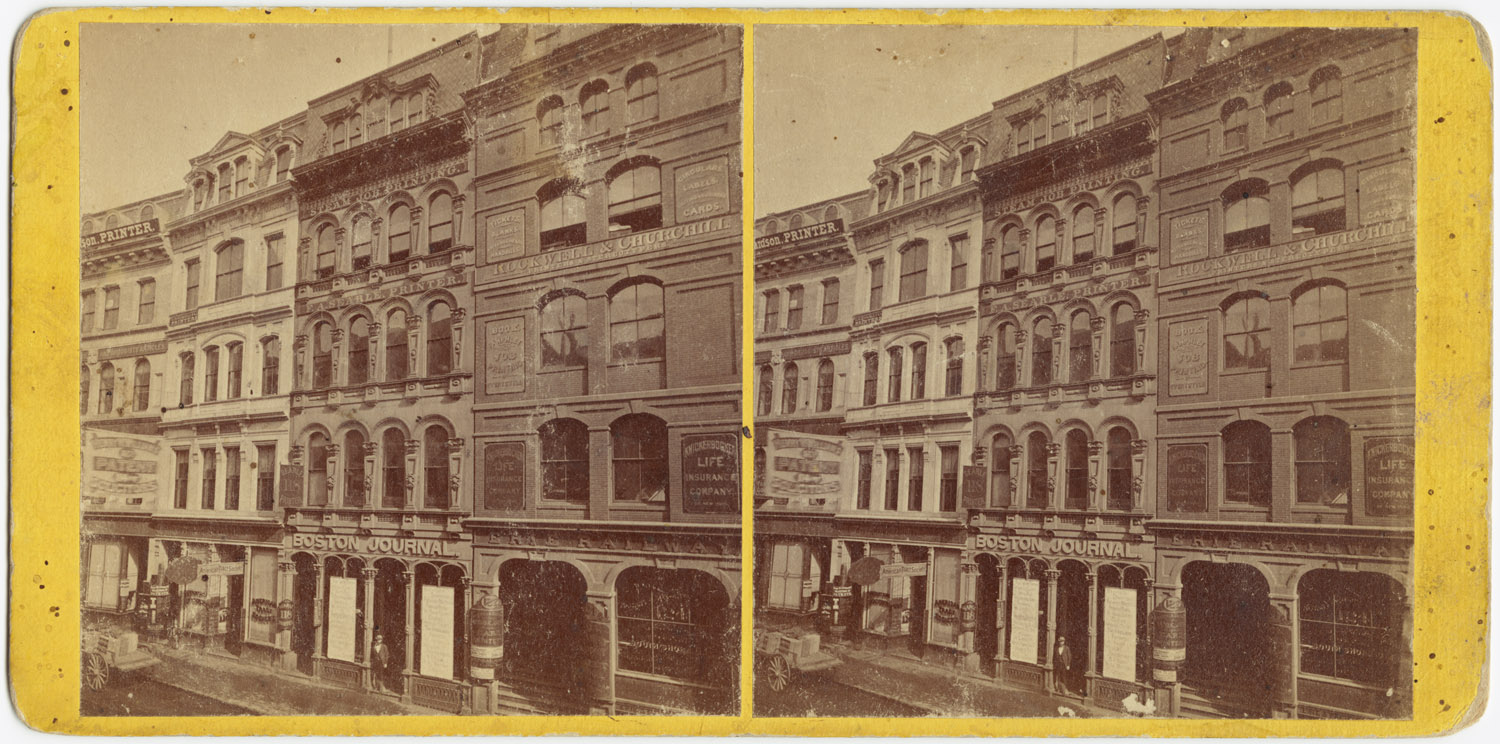
Boston Journal building, 19th century

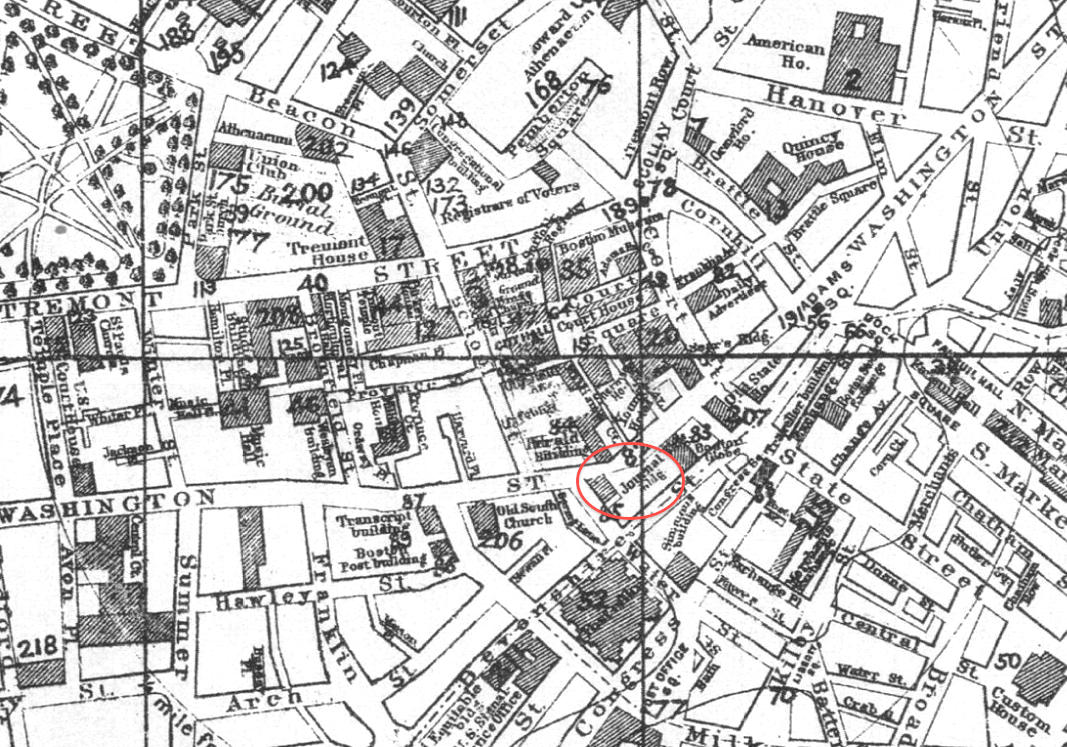
Detail of 1881 map of Boston, showing location of Journal office

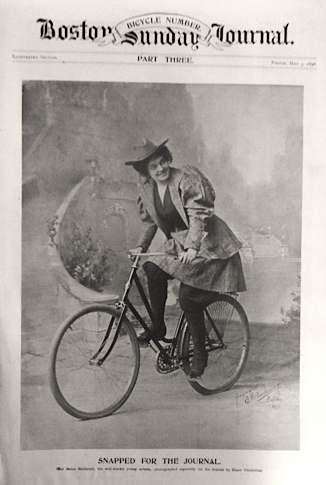
Boston Sunday Journal "Bicycle Number", May 1896

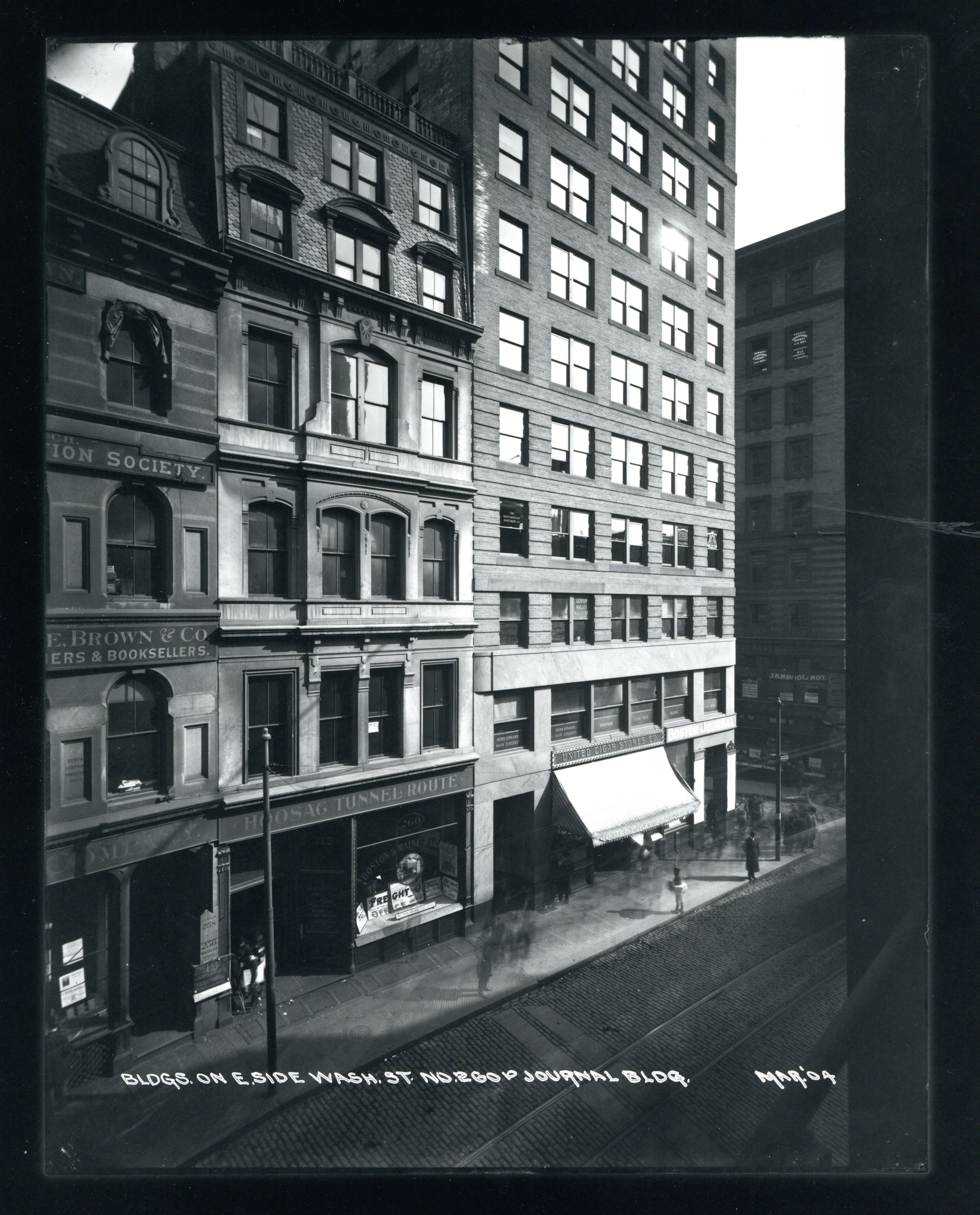
The Journal Building in 1904

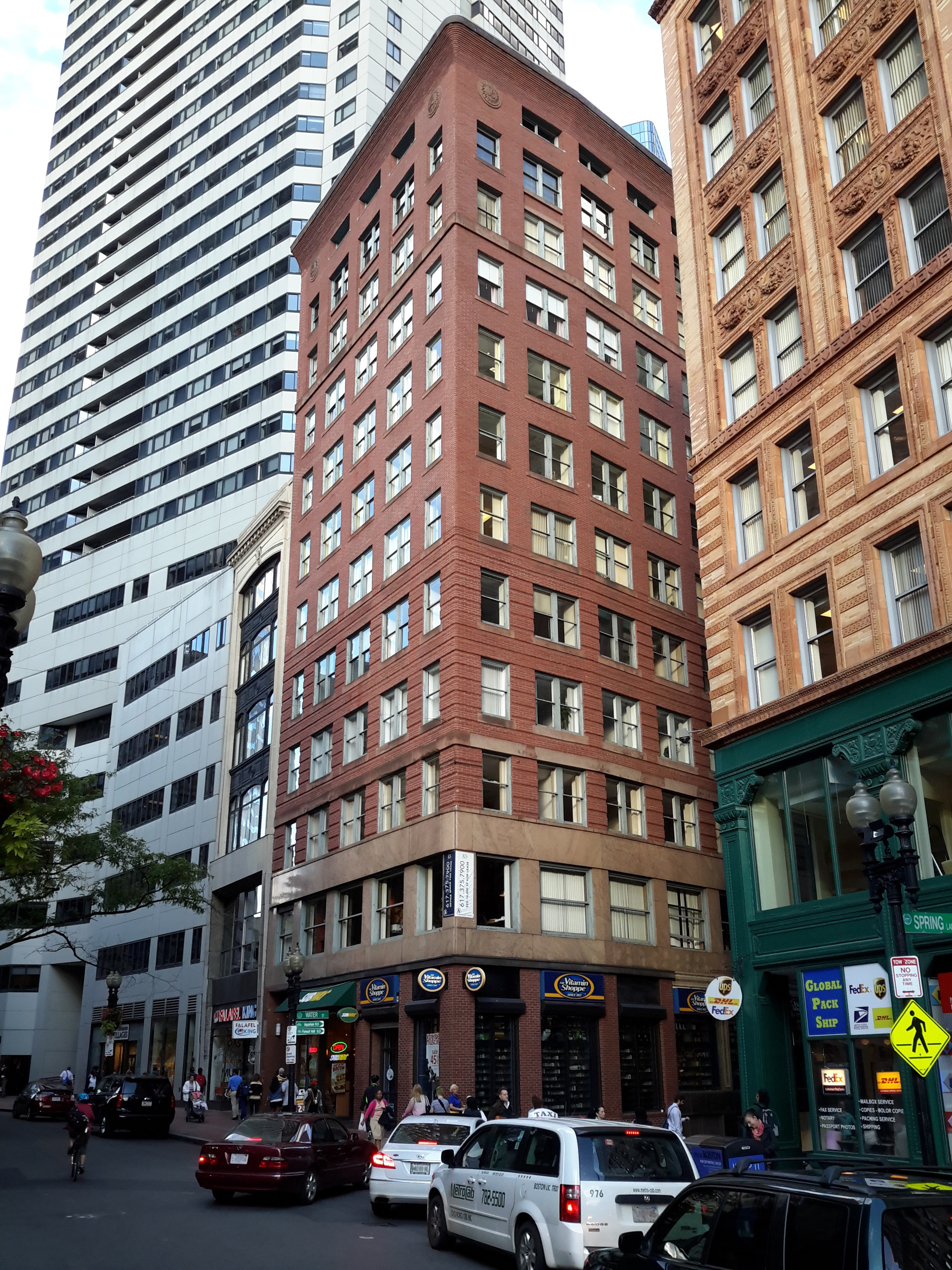
The Journal Building in 2014
