= John Sherburne (pioneer) =

John Sherburne (August 13, 1615 – 1698) was an emigrant from England to New England. He arrived at Portsmouth, New Hampshire, on June 12, 1632 aboard the "James" with his brother Henry Sherburne. They were early New England pioneers, penniless despite aristocratic connections in England, and rose to considerable wealth in colonial New Hampshire. John Samuel Sherburne, (1757 – August 2, 1830), a prominent colonial and early American politician in New England, was Sherburne's descendant, as was John Sherburne Sleeper (1794–1878).

== Background ==
John and Henry, the family's founders in the New World, were lineal descendants of the Sherburne family of England (their ancestors could trace their lineage to Charlemagne). These Sherburnes built Stonyhurst Hall in Lancashire, England but Stonyhurst was lost to the family when the elder branch became extinct in 1717. By then the New England Sherburnes -- descended from a younger son -- were already in New Hampshire. Stonyhurst is now Stonyhurst College. In addition to their Continental aristocratic connections, the Sherburnes of Stonyhurst and New England were among England's oldest families, their ancestors the Mittons on pre-Stonyhurst lands having been mentioned in the Doomsday Book.

After Sherburne's great grandfather left Stonyhurst for Oxford, England, where he dwelled in Beam Hall, now a student house at Merton College, his father Joseph moved to Odiham, where John and his brother Henry were born. Following their father's death, financial setbacks, and with limited prospects in England, the brothers decided to try their lot in America.

== Legacy ==
Sherburne was with his brother Henry the progenitor of the New England Sherburne family, which made many contributions to the American Revolution and subsequent republic. One of the earliest Sherburne family homes (built 1695-1703) still stands, and is preserved at Strawbery Banke Museum in Portsmouth, New Hampshire.
