= Theodore Otis =

American politician

7th Mayor of Roxbury, Massachusetts
- In office 1859–1860
- Preceded by: John Sherburne Sleeper
- Succeeded by: William Gaston

Massachusetts House of Representatives for the 4th Norfolk District,

Personal details
- Born: December 15, 1810
- Died: July 11, 1873 (aged 62)
- Party: Free Soil
- Spouse: Harriet Blanchard
- Children: James Otis
- Education: Union College
- Profession: Attorney

Theodore Otis (December 15, 1810 – July 11, 1873) was an American politician, who served as a member of the Massachusetts House of Representatives and the seventh Mayor of Roxbury, Massachusetts from 1859 to 1860.

== Bibliography ==
- The Memorial History of Boston: Including Suffolk County, Massachusetts. 1630-1880. Justin Winsor (1881) p. 212.
- Acts and Resolves Passed by the General Court (1865) p. 844.
- A Manual for the Use of the General Court by Stephen Nye Gifford (1864).

Political offices
Preceded by John Sherburne Sleeper	Mayor of Roxbury, Massachusetts; 1859-1860	Succeeded by William Gaston
