= Samuel Walker (Massachusetts politician) =

American politician

3rd Mayor of Roxbury, Massachusetts
- In office August 11, 1851 – 1853
- Preceded by: Henry A. S. Dearborn
- Succeeded by: Linus Bacon Comins

Personal details
- Born: October 9, 1793 England
- Died: December 11, 1860 Roxbury, Massachusetts
- Children: 1
- Profession: Publisher

Samuel Walker (October 9, 1793 – December 11, 1860) was an American politician, who served as the third Mayor of Roxbury, Massachusetts from 1851 to 1853. Walker was also the fifth President of the Massachusetts Horticultural Society.

== Notes ==
- The Memorial History of Boston: Including Suffolk County, Massachusetts. 1630-1880. Justin Winsor (1881).

Political offices
Preceded by Henry A. S. Dearborn	Mayor of Roxbury, Massachusetts; 1851-1853	Succeeded by Linus Bacon Comins
