= Henry Sherburne =

Henry Sherburne (March 28, 1611 – 1680) of Portsmouth, New Hampshire, landed there June 12, 1632 from London, a pioneer who rose to considerable wealth in pre-independence colonial New Hampshire. His descendant Samuel Sherburne built the 1766 (and later) house which bears Henry's name today in Portsmouth. Henry was the older brother of John Sherburne, another New Hampshire pioneer. Colonel Tobias Lear, George Washington's private secretary, was his great grandson.

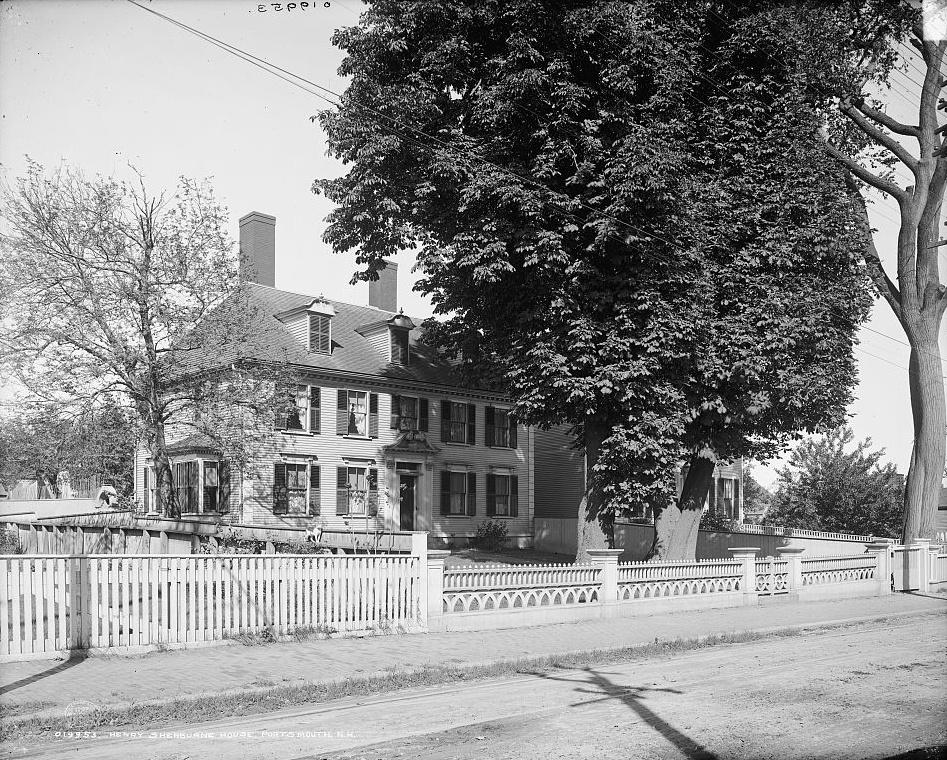

Sherburne and his brother John were lineal descendants of the illustrious "Sherburne" (or Shireburn) family of England (their ancestors progressively built Stonyhurst Hall in Lancashire, England but lost it when the elder branch of the family, which remained there, became extinct in 1717).

After Henry's great grandfather quit Stonyhurst for Oxford, England, where he dwelled in Beam Hall, Henry's father Joseph moved to Odiham, where Henry was born. While it's unknown where he was educated, in the New World Sherburne's classical education and fine court hand quickly proved useful. By 1640 he was a warden of the Church of England in Portsmouth, and was thereafter selected as town clerk (1656–1660), treasurer, and commissioner of Portsmouth.

In 1644 he was appointed judge at Portsmouth. Later the General Court of Massachusetts appointed him associate judge. He was a large landowner in Portsmouth. He married twice; first to the daughter of New Hampshire pioneer Ambrose Gibbons, by whom he had many children who have since spread about the New World.
