= John Frank Clark =

John F. Clark is a professor of Politics and International Relations at Florida International University, Miami and former Fulbright scholar. He specializes in state-society relations of African polities and the international relations of sub-Saharan Africa.

He has conducted research in Congo-Brazzaville, the Democratic Republic of Congo and other Central African states and was chair of the Department of International Relations at Florida International University from 2002–2007. He has lectured in Kampala, Uganda at Makerere University.

Clark graduated from Georgia Southern University (A.B., Political Science, Magna Cum Laude, 1986) and the University of Virginia (Ph.D. thesis, Foreign Affairs, 1992). His dissertation is titled Superpower Intervention in Several Conflicts of Sub-Saharan Africa.

== Books ==
- The Failure of Democracy in the Republic of Congo. Boulder, Colo.: Lynne Rienner, January 2008. ISBN 1588265552
- The African Stakes of the Congo War, Edited. New York: Palgrave, and Kampala, Uganda: Fountain, 2002. ISBN 1403967237
- Political Reform in Francophone Africa Co-edited with David E. Gardinier. Boulder, Colo.: Westview Press, 1997. ISBN 0813327865.

== Journal articles ==
- Does Democratization Reduce the Risk of Military Interventions in Politics in Africa?, Democratization 15, no.2 (April 2008). (With Staffan I. Lindberg).
- The Decline of the African Military Coup, Journal of Democracy 18, no.2 (2007): 141-155.
- Understanding Democratic Survival and Democratic Failure in Africa: Insights from the Divergent Democratic Experiments in Benin and Congo.' Comparative Studies in Society and History 47, no.3 (July 2005): 552-582 (With Bruce A. Magnusson).
- Resource Revenues and Political Development in sub-Saharan Africa: Congo Republic in Comparative Perspective. Afrika Spectrum 37, no.1 (2002): 25-41.
- The Neo-Colonial Context of the Democratic Experiment of Congo-Brazzaville. African Affairs 101, no.403 (April 2002): 171-192. Reprinted as "Le context néocolonial de l'expérience démocratique au Congo-Brazzaville," in Patrick Quantin, ed., L'Afrique politique 2002, Paris: Karthala, 2003. [Annual compendium of important articles on African politics and society.]
- Explaining Ugandan Intervention in Congo: evidence and explanations. Journal of Modern African Studies 39, no.2 (June 2001): 261-87.
- UEMOA and ECOWAS: Conflict or Cooperation in the Era of the 'New Regionalism. Global Development Studies 2, nos. 3-4 (Spring 2001): 167-195. (With Sekou Camara).
- The Clinton Administration and Africa: White House Involvement and the Foreign Affairs Bureaucracies in Clinton's Africa Policy. Issue 26, no.2 (1998): 8-13.
- The Nature and Evolution of the State in Zaire.Studies in Comparative International Development 32, no.4 (Winter 1998): 3-23.
- Foreign Intervention in the Civil War of the Congo Republic. Issue 26, no.1 (1998): 31-36.
- Democracy Dismantled in the Congo Republic. Current History 97, no. 619 (May 1998): 234- 237.
- Petro-Politics in the Republic of Congo. Journal of Democracy 8, no. 3 (July 1997): 62-76.
- Reform or Democratization for Africa? Troubling Constraints and Partial Solutions, Transafrica Forum 10, no. 1 (1996): 3-19.
- Ethno-Regionalism in Zaire: Roots, Manifestations and Meaning, Journal of African Policy Studies 1, no. 2 (1995): 23-45.
- Evaluating the Efficacy of Foreign Policy: An Essay on the Complexity of Foreign Policy Goals, Southeastern Political Review 23, no. 4 (December 1995): 559-79.
- Elections, Leadership and Democracy in Congo, Africa Today 41, no.3, (3rd Quarter 1994): 41-60.
- The Constraints on Democracy in Sub-Saharan Africa: The Case for Limited Democracy, SAIS Review XIV, no.2 (Summer-Fall 1994): 91-108. Reprinted in Lyn Graybill and Kenneth W. Thompson, eds., Africa's Second Wave of Freedom, Lanham, Md: University Press of America, 1998: 43-64.
- The National Conference as an Instrument of Democratization in Francophone Africa, Journal of Third World Studies 11, no.1 (Spring 1994): 304-335.
- Collective Interventions After the Cold War: Lessons from the U.N. Mission to the Congo, 1960–1964, Journal of Political Science 12 (1994): 93-115.
- Socio-Political Change in the Republic of the Congo: Political Dilemmas of Economic Reform, Journal of Third World Studies 10, no.1 (Spring 1993): 52-77.
