= Louise Tythacott =

Louise Ann Tythacott
- Died: 2026
- Occupations: Curator, academic, and author

Academic background
- Education: B.A. Ph.D.
- Alma mater: University of Kent; University of Hong Kong; University of Westminster; University of Manchester

Louise Ann Tythacott was a professor emerita at SOAS University of London.. She died in March 2026.

Tythacott's scholarly contributions included authoring academic books and publishing in journals, book chapters, and exhibition catalogues, some of which have been translated into Chinese and French. She also led and collaborated on research projects, serving as a PI and co-PI, including a Leverhulme and privately funded project to trace the biographies of looted objects from China's "Summer Palace" and an AHRC-funded study on Tibetan Buddhist monastery collections in Ladakh and northern Nepal. The findings of these Projects are reflected in edited volumes, such as Collecting and Displaying China's 'Summer Palace' in the West: the Yuanmingyuan in Britain and France, and Tibetan Monastery Collections and Museums: Traditional Practices and Contemporary Issues.

Tythacott held the role of Managing Editor for the journal Museum and Society from 2011 to 2016. Additionally, she served as a Trustee of the James Henry Green Charitable Trust.

== Education ==
Tythacott completed a BA in Social Anthropology with Southeast Asian Studies at the University of Kent at Canterbury in 1989. In 1991, she received a Rotary Foundation International Scholarship to study at the University of Hong Kong. In 1993, she earned diplomas in Spoken Mandarin, Written Chinese, and Spoken Cantonese all from the University of Westminster. She later earned a PhD from the University of Manchester.

== Career ==
In 1991, Tythacott began her career as a Curator at the Burma Rifles Museum, followed by a role as a French and English guide at the Royal Pavilion, Art Gallery & Museums, Brighton. She was later employed as an Asian Art Picture Researcher for The Dictionary of Art at Macmillan Publishers in London. In 1996, she was appointed Curator of Ethnology at National Museums Liverpool. She later headed the Asian, African, American, and Oceanic Department and held the position of Curator of Asian Collections at National Museums Liverpool until 2003, where she also served as the Lead Project Curator for the World Cultures Gallery.

Between 2003 and 2014, Tythacott was employed as a lecturer in museology at the University of Manchester. At SOAS University of London, she was Pratapaditya Pal Senior Lecturer from 2014 to 2019 and subsequently promoted to Pratapaditya Pal Professor, which she held until 2020. She was also designated Woon Tai Jee Professor of Asian Art at Northumbria University for a brief period. In the same timeframe, she held the role of Professor of Curating and Museology at SOAS from 2021 to 2024 and has been a professor emerita since then.

== Works ==
In 2003, Tythacott published her first monograph Surrealism and the Exotic, which explored the Surrealists' travels across Africa, Oceania, Mexico, and the Caribbean, their collections, and their engagement with non-Western cultures, influencing their artistic and intellectual pursuits in the early 20th century. Sean Kingston remarked that "Tythacott provides an excellent survey of the historical material" and characterized her work as "impressive." Michael Hitchcock from the London Metropolitan University, regarded the book as a "carefully researched, well-written, and often entertaining book that explores the central paradox of the Surrealists." Her scholarly interests also extended to the publication of The Lives of Chinese Objects: Buddhism, Imperialism and Display (translated into Chinese in 2025), in which she traced the history of rare Buddhist statues, revealing their journey from 15th-century China to 19th-century Britain and their rediscovery in 2005. Andrew Law of Newcastle University described her book as "an excellent and thoroughly researched investigation." He highlighted its "continual critical reflexivity" and "self-criticism" as its most impressive aspects. Moreover, Marzia Varutti in her review, noted that the book provides "a wealth of theoretical insights on a broad range of issues."

Tythacott co-edited books on restitution. Museums and Restitution: New Practices, New Approaches, with Arvanitis, examined how museums navigated restitution by addressing ownership, evolving practices, and institutional challenges, while also considering the perspectives of source communities, policymakers, and visitors in shaping restitution discourse. Mireille Lamontagne stated that the authors had done "an impressive job of selecting a broad range of case studies" and had created "a must-have reference for museum professionals." She also co-edited Returning Southeast Asia's Past: Objects, Museums, and Restitution, which examined Southeast Asian cultural restitution, emphasizing shifting power dynamics, legal challenges, and its role in national identity narratives. The Asian Review of Books documented it as an "interesting, well-researched book" and praised how "landscape of repatriation is explored eloquently and with great sensitivity." She also completed a catalogue devoted to the biographies of imperial objects looted from China's "Summer Palace" in 1860.

== Awards and honors ==
- Elected Fellow, Royal Asiatic Society
- 2020 – Elected Fellow, Royal Historical Society
- Elected Fellow, Royal Anthropological Institute
- 2021 – Senior Fellow, Higher Education Academy

== Bibliography ==
=== Books ===
- Surrealism and the Exotic (2003) ISBN 978-1-134-47519-3
- The Lives of Chinese Objects: Buddhism, Imperialism and Display (2011) ISBN 978-0-85745-239-9
- Museums and Restitution: New Practices, New Approaches Ashgate (2014) ISBN 978-1-317-09286-5, 978-1-4094-3564-8 (editor with Kostas Arvanitis)
- Collecting and Displaying China's “Summer Palace” in the West: The Yuanmingyuan in Britain and France (2017) ISBN 978-1-351-62489-3 (editor)
- Returning Southeast Asia's Past: Objects, Museums, and Restitution (2021) ISBN 978-981-325-124-3
- Tibetan Monastery Collections and Museums: Traditional Practices and Contemporary Issues (2024) ISBN 978-9937-733-41-0 (editor with Christian Luczanits)

=== Selected articles ===
- Tythacott, L. (1999). A 'Convulsive Beauty': Surrealism, Oceania and African Art. Journal of Museum Ethnography, (11), 43–54.
- Tythacott, L. (2011). Race on display: the ‘Melanian’,‘Mongolian’and ‘Caucasian’galleries at Liverpool Museum (1896–1929). Early Popular Visual Culture, 9(2), 131-146.
- Tythacott, L. (2015). Trophies of War: Representing ‘Summer Palace’ loot in Military Museums in the UK. Museum and Society, 13(4), 469–488.
- Tythacott, L. (2018). Exhibiting and Auctioning Yuanmingyuan (" Summer Palace") Loot in 1860s and 1870s London: The Elgin and Negroni Collections. Journal for Art Market Studies, 2(3).
- Tythacott, L., & Bellini, C. (2020). Deity and Display: Meanings, Transformations, and Exhibitions of Tibetan Buddhist Objects. Religions, 11(3), 1-28.
