= John Clark (English footballer) =

English footballer

Personal information
- Place of birth: Durham, England
- Position: Forward

Senior career*
Years	Team	Apps	(Gls)
- Bathgate
1912–1913	Bradford City	6	(1)
1913–1915	Cardiff City	8	(1)
Total		14	(2)
- * Club domestic league appearances and goals

John Clark was an English professional footballer who played as a forward.

== Career ==
Born in Durham, Clark played for Bathgate, Bradford City and Cardiff City. For Bradford City, he made 6 appearances in the Football League, scoring once. For Cardiff City he made 8 appearances in the Southern Football League, scoring once.

== Sources ==
- Frost, Terry (1988). Bradford City A Complete Record 1903-1988. Breedon Books Sport. ISBN 0-907969-38-0.
- Shepherd, Richard (2002). The Definitive: Cardiff City F.C. SoccerData Publications. ISBN 1-899468-17-X.
