= John Clarke (poet) =

American poet

John "Jack" Clarke (1933–1992) was an American poet.

A noted poet, jazz musician and scholar of William Blake and Charles Olson, John "Jack" Clarke was the author of several books of poetry, essays and lectures, among them The End of This Side, Fathar 3, Gloucester Sonnets, and In the Analogy (published posthumously). From Feathers To Iron, his masterwork on poetics, was published in 1987. In the Analogy, a fragmentary collection of more than 200 sonnets composed as an epic, is his response/furthering of Olson's Maximus Poems.

As director of the Institute of Further Studies (founded in 1965 with George F. Butterick, Fred Wah, and Albert Glover), he and Albert Glover oversaw the publication of A Curriculum of the Soul, (Spuyten Duyvil, 2016) a serial epic homage to Olson, based on his poem of the same name, which gathers the work of 28 of Olson's companions in poetry. He taught for 29 years at the State University of New York at Buffalo. From 1989 to 1991 he edited intent: letter of talk, thinking, and document. In 1989 he was awarded the Ohioanna Poetry Award from the Ohio Library Association (Clarke was a native of Ohio) and in 1991, the prestigious Artists Fellowship for Poetry presented by the New York Foundation for the Arts.
