= John Clark (cricketer) =

Australian cricketer (born 1928)

Personal information
- Born: 14 October 1928 (age 98); Sydney, Australia
- Source: ESPNcricinfo, 24 December 2016

John Lawrence Clark (born 14 October 1928) is an Australian cricketer. He played three first-class matches for New South Wales and Queensland between 1952/53 and 1953/54.

== See also ==
- List of New South Wales representative cricketers
