= John T. Clarke =

American academic

John Clarke
- Born: 1952 (age 73–74); Chicago, Illinois, United States
- Education: Denison University (BA); Johns Hopkins University (PhD)

John T. Clarke (born 1952) is a professor of astronomy and director of the Center for Space Physics at Boston University. Clarke is best known for his Hubble Space Telescope observations of the aurora on Jupiter and Saturn, as well as over 260 papers in refereed journals, including every planet except Mercury and the interplanetary medium. Clarke's research is focussed on vacuum ultraviolet instrumentation and observations of planetary atmospheres. At present this includes primarily observations with the Hubble Space Telescope, overseeing the echelle channel on the MAVEN IUVS instrument orbiting Mars, and as Deputy-PI for the upcoming GLIDE mission to image the Earth's geocorona.

== Early life and education ==
Clarke was born in Chicago, Illinois. He received his bachelor's degree in physics from Denison University, located in Ohio, in 1974. He received both his master's and PhD in physics from Johns Hopkins University, in 1978 and 1980, respectively. His thesis involved far-ultraviolet observations of Jupiter and Saturn using the IUE satellite and a sounding rocket, including the aurora and day glow on both planets and the Io plasma torus.

== Career ==
Clarke began his career in 1980 as an Assistant Research Physicist at the space sciences laboratory at the University of California, Berkeley. He observed X-ray sources from ground-based telescopes and found the first evidence for aurora on Uranus.

In 1984, he became the Deputy Project Scientist for the Hubble Space Telescope Project at the NASA Marshall Space Flight Center. After a year, he became an Advanced Instruments Scientist for the same Hubble Space Telescope Project, this time at the NASA Goddard Space Flight Center.

From 1987 to 2001, Clarke was a Research Scientist at the University of Michigan.

From 2001 to the present, Clarke is a Professor of Astronomy and the Director of the Center for Space Physics at Boston University. His research focuses on planetary atmospheres, planetary atmospheres, and UV instrumentation. He is the author or co-author of over 260 articles in refereed journals.

== Scientific contributions ==
Clarke has had observing programs with the Hubble Space Telescope in every cycle of the program, with observations of planetary atmospheres and aurora, and was on the science team for the WFPC 2. He also currently has a sounding rocket research program, and is a Co-I on the MAVEN mission to Mars.

== Honors and awards ==
- (1987) NASA Scientific Research Award
- (1994) NASA Group Achievement Awards (3) for WFPC 2: First Servicing Mission, WFPC 2 Science, WFPC 2 Calibration
- (1994) University of Michigan Research Excellence Award
- (1996) NASA Group Achievement Award for Comet S/L-9 Jupiter Impact Observations Team
- (1998) University of Michigan Research Achievement Award
- (2005) Alumni Merit Citation, Denison University
- (2012-2019) 4 NASA MAVEN Mission Awards
- (2016) American Geophysical Union Fellow

== Professional memberships ==
- American Astronomical Society
- International Astronomical Union
- American Geophysical Union
- American Assoc. Adv. Science
