= John Clerk (writer) =

John Clerk (died 1552) was an English Roman Catholic writer.

== Life ==
Clerk is said to have been descended 'from famous and noble lineage.' He was educated for a time in 'grammaticals, logicals, and philosophicals among the Oxonians,' though in what college or hall Anthony a Wood was unable to discover. He then travelled on the continent, and became proficient in the French and Italian languages. In Italy he was the intimate friend of the eminent divine and statesman Richard Pace. 'All things were in a manner common between them, and what was by either read or observed was forthwith communicated to each other's great advantage.' On his return to England he obtained the post of secretary to Thomas Howard, 3rd Duke of Norfolk. At length he, like his patron, was accused of leze majesty, and committed to the Tower of London, where, to avoid public shame, as has been conjectured, he hanged himself in his cell with his girdle on 10 May 1552.

== Works ==
Clerk, who was a steady adherent of Roman Catholicism, wrote: 'A Treatise of Nobility,' translated from the French, London, 1543, 12mo. 'Opusculum plane divinum de mortuorum resurrectione et extremo iuditio, in quatuor linguis succincte conscriptum. Latyne, Englysshe, Italian, Frenche,' London, 1545, 4to, 2nd edition 1547, 4to. Dedicated to Henry, earl of Surrey, K.G. Tanner notices a third edition in 1573, 4to. The English and French texts are in blackletter, the Latin and Italian in Roman characters. This excessively rare book is printed in double columns, so that the four languages are apparent at one view. 'A Declaration briefly conteyning as well the true understandynge of tharticles ensuynge as also a recitall of the capital errours against the same. Predestination, Ffree will, Faythe, Justification, Good woorkes, Christian libertye,' London, 1546, 8vo; dedicated in Italian to Thomas, duke of Norfolk. Meditations on death.
