= John Clark (rugby league) =

English rugby league footballer

Personal information
- Born: 7th April 1939 c. 1939
- Died: January 2011 (aged 71); Chorley, Lancashire, England

Playing information
- Position: Prop, Loose forward
Club
Years	Team	Pld	T	G	FG	P
1958–65	Castleford	61	14	100	0	242
1965	Wigan	4	0	6	0	12
1965–67	Warrington	32	3	3	0	15
	Total	97	17	109	0	269

John Clark (c. 1940 – January 2011) was an English professional rugby league footballer who played in the 1950s and 1960s. He played at club level for Castleford, Wigan, and Warrington.

== Playing career ==
=== County League appearances ===
John Clark played in Castleford's victory in the Yorkshire League during the 1964–65 season.

=== Club career ===
John Clark made his début for Warrington in the victory over Wigan on 13 November 1965, and played his last game for Warrington on 23 December 1967, after a knee injury ended his career.
