= John Clarke (cricketer, born 1948) =

English cricketer

Personal information
- Full name: John Michael Clarke
- Born: 25 December 1948 (age 77); Barcombe, Sussex, England
- Batting: Left-handed
- Bowling: Right-arm medium-fast

Domestic team information
- Years: Team
- 1969: Sussex

Career statistics
Competition	First-class
Matches	1
Runs scored	0
Batting average	0.00
100s/50s	–/–
Top score	0
Balls bowled	–
Wickets	–
Bowling average	–
5 wickets in innings	–
10 wickets in match	–
Best bowling	–
Catches/stumpings	–/–
- Source: Cricinfo, 10 March 2012

John Michael Clarke (born 25 December 1948) is a former English cricketer. Clarke was a left-handed batsman who bowled right-arm medium-fast. He was born at Barcombe, Sussex.

Clarke made a single first-class appearance for Sussex against Hampshire at the United Services Recreation Ground, Portsmouth, in the 1969 County Championship. In Sussex's first-innings of 159, Clarke was run out for a duck, while in their second-innings of 233, he was dismissed for the same score by Bob Cottam. Hampshire won the match by 8 wickets. This was his only major appearance for Sussex.
