= Space Age: NASA's Story =

Production
- Production company: Dangerous Films

Original release
- Release: 1 January – 22 January 2011

Space Age: NASA's Story is a documentary series by Dangerous Films for the BBC to commemorate 50 years since the formation of NASA. The series looks at NASA's early history, the triumphs and disasters, notably the Apollo 1 fire, through to the Apollo Moon missions and the Space Shuttle era. The show includes various interviews with astronauts and NASA personnel such as Chris Kraft, Jon Clark, Leroy Cain, Scott Carpenter, Neil Armstrong and Buzz Aldrin, both crew members of Apollo 11.

The show was broadcast in the United Kingdom and Germany in June and July 2009.

== Episodes ==
The series consists of 4 episodes.

No.	Title	Original release date
1	"From The Ground Up"	1 January 2011
2	"To The Moon"	8 January 2011
3	"Triumph & Tragedy"	15 January 2011
4	"Life & Death in Space"	22 January 2011
