= John Clarke (English footballer) =

English footballer

Personal information
- Place of birth: Annfield Plain, England
- Position: Forward

Senior career*
Years	Team	Apps	(Gls)
1912–1913	Middlesbrough	0	(0)
1913–1914	Brentford		
1914–1919	Durham City		
1919–1921	Grimsby Town	39	(12)
1921–1922	Leadgate Park		
1922–1923	Coventry City	0	(0)
- * Club domestic league appearances and goals

John Clarke was an English professional footballer who played as a centre-forward in the Football League for Grimsby Town.
