= John Clarke (Australian cricketer) =

Australian cricketer

Personal information
- Born: 1829
- Died: 29 February 1872 (aged 42–43); Bourke, New South Wales, Australia
- Source: ESPNcricinfo, 24 December 2016

John Clarke (1829 – 29 February 1872) was an Australian cricketer. He played three first-class matches for New South Wales between 1859/60 and 1862/63.

== See also ==
- List of New South Wales representative cricketers
