= Jackie Clark =

Jackie Clark or Clarke may refer to:

- Jackie Clark (cricketer) (born 1963), New Zealand women's cricketer
- Jackie Clark (philanthropist) (born 1964), New Zealand women's advocate
- Jackie Clarke (born 1966), New Zealand entertainer
- Jackie Clarke (footballer) (born 1949), Irish men's footballer

== See also ==
- Jacky Clark Chisholm, American gospel singer
- Jack Clark (disambiguation)
- Jack Clarke (disambiguation)
