= John Clarke (Michigan politician) =

American politician

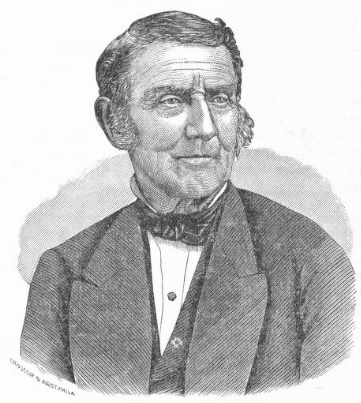

Member of the Michigan Senate from the 5th district
- In office November 2, 1835 – January 5, 1839

Member of the Michigan House of Representatives from the St. Clair County, 1st district
- In office January 7, 1857 – January 4, 1859

Personal details
- Born: July 29, 1797 Bath, Maine
- Died: February 3, 1876 (aged 78)
- Party: Democratic (until 1856); Republican (after 1856)

John Clarke (July 29, 1797 – February 3, 1876), also spelled Clark, was an American businessman, farmer, and politician. He served in the Michigan Senate in the early years of Michigan's statehood, and later in the Michigan House of Representatives.

== Early life and travels ==
John Clarke was born in Bath, Massachusetts (in Maine from 1820) on July 29, 1797. He was the son of George Collins Clarke, a ship-builder and sea captain, and Mary McDonald. He left school at age 15 to become a clerk in a store in Augusta, Maine, and at age 18 his physician suggested he travel to help improve his poor health.

The War of 1812 had just ended and it was again safe to travel, so Clarke sailed to Bremen, Germany. He traveled through Germany, England, and Scotland, before embarking for Boston aboard the ship Ellington along with his uncle. The ship foundered during a storm in the mid-Atlantic, and the passengers and crew were forced into the ship's small boats for three days. A Scottish brig picked them up, and they stayed on it for three more days before the James Madison arrived to deliver them to Philadelphia 32 days later. In Philadelphia, he was separated from his uncle and wandered for three days with no money or food before his uncle found him and paid for him to return home. He worked again as a clerk in a store in Hallowell, Maine, before moving to Belfast, Maine, in 1818, and operating a mercantile business.

Clarke was an avid supporter of the Democratic-Republican Party and performed a variety of duties for the party, although he refused to accept a political position. He worked for the election of Andrew Jackson in the election of 1824, which Jackson lost when the House of Representatives elected John Quincy Adams. Clarke's health began to deteriorate again and he closed his business, but remained active in political circles. After Jackson's election as president in 1828, Clarke met him while in Washington, D.C., on business, and the two became close friends.

== Life in Michigan ==
He moved to Detroit in 1830 and opened a mercantile business near the corner of Woodward and Jefferson Avenues. In 1832, he bought a large tract of land in China, Michigan, on the St. Clair River, and moved to Port Huron. During this time, he worked as the captain of a steamboat that traveled between Toledo and Port Huron, the General Gratiot, and in 1835 he moved to the property he owned in China, where he built a dock and a store and engaged in trading. The first town meeting in China Township after it was established on March 21, 1835, was held at Clarke's house.

Clarke was a delegate to the state constitutional convention in 1835, was elected to the Michigan Senate in the first elections under the new constitution, and was re-elected to two additional terms. Although Michigan had a constitution, its admission to the union was blocked due to an ongoing dispute with Ohio known as the Toledo War. Clarke went to Washington at the request of several influential residents of Michigan Territory to present an argument in favor of statehood to President Jackson. When other representatives made their cases, Jackson told them, "You have no influence with the Cabinet. We look to Mr. Clarke for all the information we desire. We know him, and have the fullest confidence in him." Secretary of State John Forsyth told Clarke he could have any gift he wanted from the president, but Clarke declined to pursue an appointed office.

Friends asked Clarke to put his name in nomination for the United States Senate, but he refused. President Jackson appointed him in 1837 as one of two commissioners charged with acquiring the title of Native American lands in Michigan. He served as a supervisor for China Township from 1847 to 1848, and was a delegate again to the state constitutional convention of 1850. Clarke left the Democratic Party following the nomination of James Buchanan in 1856, and joined the Republicans as a supporter of John C. Frémont. He served a term in the Michigan House of Representatives from 1857 to 1858.

== Family and personal life ==
Clarke married Mary Sherbun of Hallowell in December 1819. They had a daughter named Emeline. He was a Freemason and a Knight Templar, and petitioned for the creation of a commandery in St. Clair, Michigan, which thereafter was named the "John Clark Commandery".

Clarke died on February 3, 1876, and is buried in Rosehill Cemetery in St. Clair.
