= John Jones Clarke =

American politician

1st Mayor of Roxbury, Massachusetts
- In office 1846–1846
- Preceded by: Board of Selectmen
- Succeeded by: Henry A. S. Dearborn

Member of the Massachusetts Senate
- In office 1853–1853

Member of the Massachusetts House of Representatives
- In office 1836–1837

Personal details
- Born: February 24, 1803 Norton, Massachusetts
- Died: November 5, 1887 (aged 84) Boston, Massachusetts
- Spouse: Rebecca Cordis Haswell
- Children: Mary L. Clarke (Hanson), Haswell C. Clarke
- Education: Norton, Framingham and Phillips Andover Academies, Harvard College.
- Profession: Attorney

John Jones Clarke (February 24, 1803 – November 25, 1887) was an American politician, who served in both branches of the Massachusetts legislature and as the first Mayor of Roxbury, Massachusetts in 1846.

== Notes ==
Political offices
Preceded by Board of Selectmen	Mayors of Roxbury, Massachusetts; 1846	Succeeded by Henry A. S. Dearborn
