= John Bailey (Massachusetts politician) =

American politician

Member of the U.S. House of Representatives from Massachusetts's 10th district
- In office December 13, 1824 – March 3, 1831
- Preceded by: Francis Baylies
- Succeeded by: Henry A. S. Dearborn

Member of the Massachusetts House of Representatives
- In office 1814–1817

Member of the Massachusetts Senate
- In office 1831–1834

Personal details
- Born: 1786 Stoughton, Massachusetts (now Canton, Massachusetts)
- Died: June 26, 1835 (aged 48–49) Dorchester, Massachusetts, U.S.
- Party: Adams-Clay Republican

John Bailey (1786 – June 26, 1835) was an American politician who served as a member of the United States House of Representatives from Massachusetts for three terms and part of a fourth from 1824 to 1831.

== Biography ==
Born in Stoughton, Massachusetts (in that part of Stoughton which later became Canton). Bailey graduated from Brown University in 1807. Bailey worked as a tutor and librarian in Providence, Rhode Island from 1807 until 1814.

=== State House ===
Bailey was elected to the Massachusetts House of Representatives and served from 1814 to 1817. He then served as a clerk in the Department of State in Washington, D.C. from 1817 until 1823.

Bailey was elected a member of the American Antiquarian Society in 1816.

=== Congress ===
Bailey presented credentials as a Member-elect to the Eighteenth Congress, but his election was contested on residency requirements. A House resolution on March 18, 1824, declared he was not entitled to the seat.

Upon returning to Canton, Bailey was elected as an Adams-Clay Republican. His subsequent re-elections allowed him to serve the Nineteenth and Twentieth Congresses. During his tenure Bailey chaired the Committee on Expenditures in the Department of State.

Bailey ran as an Anti-Jacksonian in the Twenty-first Congress but was not a candidate for renomination in 1830.

=== State Senate ===
He was a member of the Massachusetts State senate from 1831 to 1834, and ran as the unsuccessful Anti-Masonic candidate for Governor of Massachusetts in 1834.

=== Death ===
He died in Dorchester, Massachusetts on June 26, 1835.

== See also ==
Party political offices
Preceded by John Quincy Adams	Anti-Masonic nominee for Governor of Massachusetts; 1834	Succeeded by None
U.S. House of Representatives
Preceded by Francis Baylies	Member of the U.S. House of Representatives from Massachusetts's 10th congressional district March 4, 1831 – March 3, 1833	Succeeded by Henry A. S. Dearborn
