= John Sherburne Sleeper =

American politician

6th Mayor of Roxbury, Massachusetts
- In office 1856–1858
- Preceded by: James Ritchie
- Succeeded by: Theodore Otis

Member of the Massachusetts Senate from the 7th Suffolk district

Member of the Massachusetts House of Representatives

Personal details
- Born: September 25, 1794 Tyngsborough, Massachusetts,
- Died: November 14, 1878 (aged 84)
- Spouse: Mary Folsom Noble
- Children: Mary Rindge Sleeper (1833-1897); Herbert Sleeper (1841–1874); Ariana E. Sleeper (1829–1911); Charles F. Sleeper (1826-1915).
- Education: Phillips Exeter Academy

John Sherburne Sleeper (1794–1878) was an American sailor, ship master, novelist (who used the pseudonym of Hawser Martingale), journalist and politician.

== Life at sea ==
Sleeper spent 22 years in the merchant marine service shipping out of the port of Boston as a sailor, officer and shipmaster.

== Journalism career ==
Sleeper was the publisher and editor of the Exeter, New Hampshire, News-Letter, editor and proprietor of The Lowell Daily Journal and editor and part proprietor of The Boston Mercantile Journal. later The Boston Journal

Sleeper purchased The Lowell Daily Journal on May 15, 1833, and ran the paper in partnership with H. Hastings Weld, however the partnership lasted only a few months resulting in financial distress for Mr. Weld and Sleeper's moving on to work for The Boston Mercantile Journal. Sleeper was the editor of The Boston Mercantile Journal, later The Boston Journal from 1834 to 1854.

== Public service career ==
Sleeper served as a member of the Massachusetts Constitutional Convention of 1853, the Massachusetts Senate, the Massachusetts House of Representatives and, from 1856 to 1858, as the sixth Mayor of Roxbury, Massachusetts.

Sleeper was a contestant for the third congressional district of Massachusetts for the election held on November 4, 1862. Although originally ahead in the vote totals, Alexander Rice was later declared the winner by 25 votes (5,045 to 5,020).

Sleeper was a member of the First Congregational Church in Roxbury, Massachusetts.

== Books ==
- A Whale Adventure in the Pacific (1841).
- Tales of the Ocean (1842).
- Salt Water Bubbles: Or, Life on the Wave (1854).
- Ocean Adventures: Or, Cabin and Forecastle Yarns of Thrilling Incidents (1857).
- Jack in the Forecastle (1860).
- Mark Rowland; A tale of the Sea (1867).

== See also ==
- 1877 Massachusetts legislature

== Bibliography ==
- A Gazetteer of the State of Massachusetts: With Numerous Illustrations by Elias Nason, George Jones Varney (1890).
- A Manual for the Use of the General Court By Massachusetts General Court Stephen Nye Gifford (1877).
- Bench and Bar of the Commonwealth of Massachusetts by William Thomas Davis (1895).
- Cases of Contested Elections in Congress, from 1834 to 1865, Inclusive by David W. Bartlett (1865).
- Contributions of the Old Residents' Historical Association, Lowell, Mass by the Old Residents' Historical Association (1883).
- History of the First Church in Roxbury, Massachusetts, 1630-1904 By Walter Eliot Thwing (1908).
- History of Middlesex County, Massachusetts: Containing Carefully Prepared Histories of Every City and Town in the County by Samuel Adams Drake (1880.)
- The Memorial History of Boston: Including Suffolk County, Massachusetts. 1630-1880. by Justin Winsor (1881).
- The New England Historical and Genealogical Register by Henry Fritz-Gilbert Waters (1879).

Political offices
Preceded by James Ritchie	6th Mayor of Roxbury, Massachusetts; 1861-1853	Succeeded by Theodore Otis
