= John Clarke (physician, 1582–1653) =

English physician

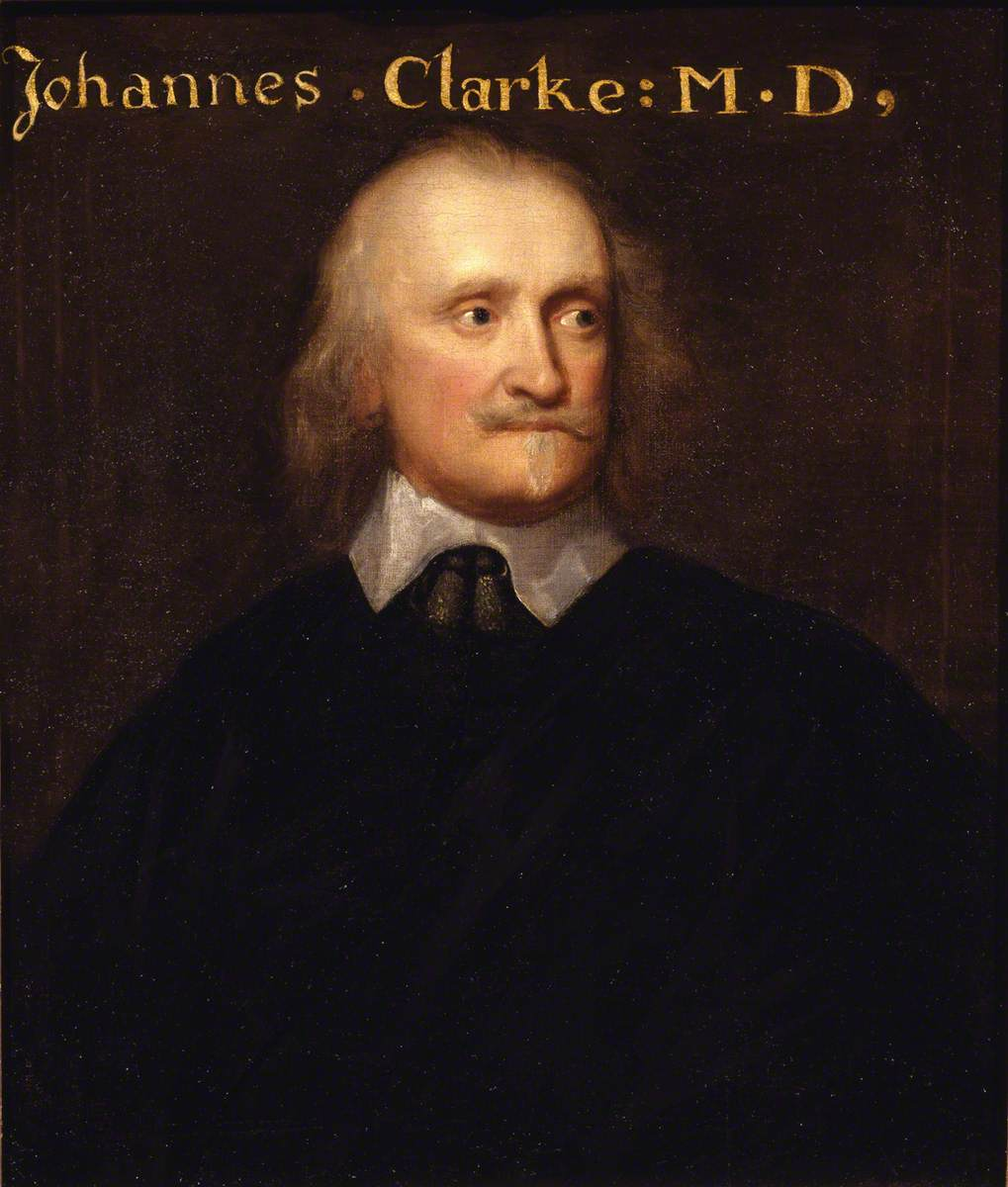
Johannes Clarke: M.D. (1645–1650)

John Clarke FRCP (c. 1582–1653) was an English physician.

== Life ==
John Clarke was born in 1582 at Brooke Hall, near Wethersfield in Essex, where his family had long been seated. He was educated at Christ's College, Cambridge, and took his first degree in 1603, proceeding MA 1608, and MD 1615.

He was elected a fellow of the College of Physicians in 1622, was treasurer 1643–4, and president from 1645 to 1649, both years included, and while in office carried out a revision of the Pharmacopœia. His name is spelt Clerk(e) in the first edition of Glisson's De Rachitide, 1650, a work which received his official sanction.

He died 30 April 1653, and his body was escorted by the president and fellows from his house to his tomb, in the Church of St. Martin-without-Ludgate. He left a son, and a daughter who married Sir John Micklethwaite, the physician, and whose daughter Ann gave to the College of Physicians the portrait of Clarke which hangs in the reading-room.
