= List of listed buildings in Penicuik, Midlothian =

This is a list of listed buildings in the parish of Penicuik in Midlothian, Scotland.

== List ==
Name	Location	Date Listed	Grid Ref. (Note: Sometimes known as OSGB36, the grid reference (where provided) is based on the British national grid reference system used by the Ordnance Survey. • "Guide to National Grid". Ordnance Survey. • "Get-a-map". Ordnance Survey.)	Geo-coordinates	Notes	LB Number (Note: Historic Environment Scotland assign a unique alphanumeric identifier to each designated site in Scotland, for listed buildings this always begins with "LB", for example "LB12345".)	Image
39-49 (Odd Nos) John Street, Including Boundary Walls				55°49′41″N 3°13′20″W	Category B	43275	Upload Photo
St Kentigern's Kirkyard, Clerks Of Penicuik Mausoleum				55°49′38″N 3°13′08″W	Category A	39292	Upload another image
Sun-Dial, Walled Garden, New Hall				55°47′48″N 3°18′57″W	Category B	14646	Upload Photo
15-23 (Odd Nos) High Street				55°49′35″N 3°13′16″W	Category C(S)	46817	Upload Photo
55 John Street, Including Boundary Walls And Gatepier				55°49′43″N 3°13′21″W	Category C(S)	46823	Upload Photo
68 John Street, Including Boundary Wall				55°49′45″N 3°13′24″W	Category C(S)	46824	Upload Photo
23 And 24 The Square				55°49′33″N 3°13′19″W	Category C(S)	46826	Upload Photo
1-5 (Odd Nos) West Street				55°49′33″N 3°13′22″W	Category C(S)	46827	Upload Photo
32 West Street, Former South Church Manse, Including Boundary Wall, Railings And Gates				55°49′32″N 3°13′26″W	Category B	46830	Upload Photo
West Street, South Church Hall				55°49′32″N 3°13′25″W	Category C(S)	46831	Upload another image
High Street, St Mungo's Parish Church (Church Of Scotland), Including Hearse House, Churchyard, Boundary Walls, Gatepiers, Railings And Gates				55°49′38″N 3°13′11″W	Category B	39290	Upload another image See more images
Mosshouses Farmhouse And Farm Ranges				55°47′51″N 3°12′35″W	Category C(S)	19393	Upload Photo
Gazebo. Old Walled Garden Penicuik Policies				55°49′04″N 3°15′19″W	Category B	14636	Upload Photo
Brunstane Castle				55°48′38″N 3°16′32″W	Category B	14643	Upload Photo
Habbie's Howe Inn Nine Mile Burn				55°48′19″N 3°18′51″W	Category C(S)	14660	Upload Photo
17 And 18 The Square				55°49′32″N 3°13′18″W	Category C(S)	46825	Upload Photo
22-34 (Even Nos) Bridge Street And 1-7 (Inclusive Nos) Park End, Including Archway				55°49′29″N 3°13′18″W	Category A	39294	Upload another image
High Street, Old Well (Cowan Well)				55°49′34″N 3°13′20″W	Category B	39299	Upload another image
Thomas Dunmore Memorial				55°47′44″N 3°19′16″W	Category B	19705	Upload Photo
27 Croft Street, 'The Old Schoolhouse'				55°49′28″N 3°13′22″W	Category C(S)	46813	Upload Photo
9 And 11 High Street				55°49′34″N 3°13′18″W	Category C(S)	46815	Upload Photo
Broomhill Road, St James The Less Church (Episcopal), Including Churchyard And Boundary Walls				55°49′29″N 3°13′39″W	Category B	39296	Upload another image
35 High Street, Glebe House, Including Pavilion Blocks, Boundary Walls And Bee Boles				55°49′36″N 3°13′13″W	Category B	39298	Upload Photo
Old Howgate Inn				55°48′37″N 3°12′04″W	Category B	14641	Upload Photo
5 And 7 High Street				55°49′34″N 3°13′18″W	Category B	46814	Upload another image
51 John Street, Including Boundary Walls				55°49′42″N 3°13′21″W	Category C(S)	46822	Upload Photo
St Kentigern's Church, Kirkyard And Boundary Wall				55°49′37″N 3°13′10″W	Category B	39291	Upload another image See more images
Valleyfield, Sepulchral Monument				55°49′36″N 3°13′06″W	Category B	39293	Upload Photo
Valleyfield Mill Site, Off Valleyfield Road, Mill Lade Cottage (Former Valleyfield School And Schoolhouse), Including Wall, Gate And Railings				55°49′29″N 3°13′11″W	Category B	39297	Upload another image
Flag Tower, Knight's Law, Penicuik Policies				55°49′26″N 3°14′48″W	Category B	14638	Upload another image
Pomathorn Road, Uttershill House, Including Boundary Walls, Gates And Gatepiers				55°49′20″N 3°13′01″W	Category B	46282	Upload Photo
50 Bog Road, Craigiebield House Hotel				55°49′39″N 3°13′40″W	Category B	46807	Upload Photo
13 High Street, The Old Crown Inn				55°49′34″N 3°13′17″W	Category C(S)	46816	Upload another image
33-37 (Odd Nos) West Street, Including Boundary Walls, Gatepiers And Gates				55°49′33″N 3°13′25″W	Category C(S)	46828	Upload Photo
2-6 (Even Nos) West Street				55°49′33″N 3°13′21″W	Category C(S)	46829	Upload Photo
Old Penicuik House				55°49′11″N 3°15′03″W	Category A	14634	Upload another image
Sophia Inglis Memorial, Wester Auchindinny				55°50′35″N 3°11′46″W	Category C(S)	14661	Upload Photo
24 Bog Road				55°49′35″N 3°13′28″W	Category B	46806	Upload Photo
12 High Street, The Railway Tavern				55°49′35″N 3°13′21″W	Category C(S)	46819	Upload Photo
34 High Street, The Royal Hotel				55°49′36″N 3°13′16″W	Category C(S)	46820	Upload Photo
Peebles Road, Penicuik South Church (Church Of Scotland), Including Boundary Walls And Gatepiers				55°49′22″N 3°13′17″W	Category A	39295	Upload another image See more images
New Penicuik House (Formerly Stables)				55°49′16″N 3°15′05″W	Category A	14635	Upload another image
Bridge, River North Esk Penicuik Policies				55°49′04″N 3°14′49″W	Category B	14637	Upload Photo
Allan Ramsay Monument Penicuik Policies				55°48′52″N 3°14′26″W	Category B	14639	Upload Photo
Uttershill Castle				55°49′20″N 3°13′01″W	Category C(S)	14640	Upload another image See more images
'Howgatemouth' Howgate				55°48′35″N 3°12′05″W	Category C(S)	14642	Upload Photo
New Hall House				55°47′44″N 3°19′03″W	Category B	14644	Upload Photo
Sun-Dial Front Garden, New Hall				55°47′43″N 3°19′02″W	Category B	14645	Upload Photo
Charlotte Campbell Memorial House, Nine Mile Burn				55°48′16″N 3°18′46″W	Category C(S)	46424	Upload Photo
25 Bog Road, Navaar House Hotel				55°49′33″N 3°13′31″W	Category B	46805	Upload Photo
18 Bridge Street				55°49′29″N 3°13′18″W	Category C(S)	46808	Upload Photo
25 Croft Street, Including Boundary Walls				55°49′27″N 3°13′23″W	Category B	46812	Upload Photo
6-10 (Even Nos) High Street, Scotmid				55°49′34″N 3°13′21″W	Category C(S)	46818	Upload Photo
High Street, Council Offices (Former Cowan Institute)				55°49′35″N 3°13′14″W	Category C(S)	46821	Upload another image
'Rustick Hut' Above Habbie's Howe				55°47′40″N 3°19′14″W	Category B	14647	Upload Photo
30 Cairnbank Road				55°49′28″N 3°13′20″W	Category B	46810	Upload Photo
Carlops Road, Penicuik High School, Including Boundary Walls, Gatepiers And Gates				55°49′52″N 3°13′43″W	Category B	46811	Upload another image

== Key ==
The scheme for classifying buildings in Scotland is:

- Category A: "buildings of national or international importance, either architectural or historic; or fine, little-altered examples of some particular period, style or building type."
- Category B: "buildings of regional or more than local importance; or major examples of some particular period, style or building type, which may have been altered."
- Category C: "buildings of local importance; lesser examples of any period, style, or building type, as originally constructed or moderately altered; and simple traditional buildings which group well with other listed buildings."

In March 2016 there were 47,288 listed buildings in Scotland. Of these, 8% were Category A, and 50% were Category B, with the remaining 42% being Category C.

== See also ==
- List of listed buildings in Midlothian
