= List of listed buildings in Borthwick, Midlothian =

This is a list of listed buildings in the parish of Borthwick in Midlothian, Scotland.

== List ==
Name	Location	Date Listed	Grid Ref. (Note: Sometimes known as OSGB36, the grid reference (where provided) is based on the British national grid reference system used by the Ordnance Survey. • "Guide to National Grid". Ordnance Survey. • "Get-a-map". Ordnance Survey.)	Geo-coordinates	Notes	LB Number (Note: Historic Environment Scotland assign a unique alphanumeric identifier to each designated site in Scotland, for listed buildings this always begins with "LB", for example "LB12345".)	Image
Arniston Policies, Sunken Garden, Vehicular Bridge Over Purvies Hill Burn				55°49′13″N 3°04′35″W	Category B	45147	Upload Photo
Easter Middleton Farm House Including Gatepiers, Boundary Walls And Walled Garden				55°48′45″N 3°01′11″W	Category B	45156	Upload Photo
Gorebridge, 25 Powdermill Brae, Including Railings				55°50′18″N 3°02′44″W	Category C(S)	45167	Upload Photo
Harvieston House Walled Garden				55°49′52″N 3°02′23″W	Category C(S)	45177	Upload Photo
Newlandburn Lodge				55°51′09″N 3°00′47″W	Category C(S)	45184	Upload Photo
Torcraik House				55°49′21″N 3°01′10″W	Category C(S)	45186	Upload Photo
Arniston Policies, 1-5 (Inclusive Nos) Arniston Home Farm Cottages				55°49′27″N 3°04′13″W	Category C(S)	45129	Upload Photo
Carlyle Lodge (Formerly Castlelaw Lodge), Arniston Policies, Including Gate, Gatepiers And Boundary Wall				55°49′31″N 3°02′14″W	Category C(S)	45132	Upload Photo
Arniston Policies, Rustic Bridge No 6 Over River South Esk				55°49′25″N 3°05′04″W	Category B	45140	Upload Photo
Currie House, Walled Garden Including Sundial				55°49′37″N 3°00′20″W	Category B	6364	Upload Photo
Middleton Hall, Including Gatepiers, Gates, Ha-Ha And Boundary Walls				55°48′48″N 3°00′36″W	Category A	806	Upload Photo
Arniston House, Including Stable Block, Outbuildings, Orangery, Ha-Ha And Sundial				55°49′27″N 3°04′43″W	Category A	808	Upload another image
Ford Village, The Mill House, Including Outbuildings And Boundary Wall				55°52′07″N 2°58′45″W	Category C(S)	817	Upload Photo
Borthwick, Old School House, Boundary Wall And Railings				55°49′32″N 3°00′36″W	Category C(S)	45152	Upload Photo
1 And 2 Catcune Farm Cottages				55°49′43″N 3°01′47″W	Category C(S)	45154	Upload Photo
Gorebridge, 34 Hunterfield Road				55°50′37″N 3°02′55″W	Category C(S)	45159	Upload Photo
Gorebridge, 32 And 34 Main Street				55°50′29″N 3°02′53″W	Category C(S)	45162	Upload another image
Gorebridge, 53 Main Street				55°50′28″N 3°02′53″W	Category C(S)	45164	Upload Photo
Gorebridge, Porters (The Old Station)				55°50′24″N 3°02′49″W	Category C(S)	45165	Upload Photo
Harvieston Mains				55°50′14″N 3°03′15″W	Category C(S)	45179	Upload Photo
1-4 (Inclusive Nos) Harvieston Mains Cottages				55°50′16″N 3°03′16″W	Category C(S)	45180	Upload Photo
Arniston Policies, Bridge Over Purvies Hill Burn				55°49′07″N 3°04′29″W	Category C(S)	45131	Upload Photo
Arniston Policies, Rustic Bridge No 5 Over River South Esk				55°50′21″N 3°04′10″W	Category B	45139	Upload Photo
18 Dewartown				55°52′01″N 2°59′37″W	Category B	793	Upload Photo
Arniston Policies, Ornamental Pillar				55°49′17″N 3°04′40″W	Category B	810	Upload Photo
Arniston Policies, Grotto				55°49′16″N 3°04′50″W	Category A	811	Upload Photo
Arniston Policies, North Lodge, And Lion And Elephant Gate, Including Gates And Gatepiers				55°50′22″N 3°03′39″W	Category A	814	Upload Photo
Ford Village, Vogrie Dower House Including Gates, Gatepiers And Boundary Walls				55°52′05″N 2°58′51″W	Category B	816	Upload Photo
11 Newlandrig Including Boundary Wall And Letter Box				55°51′10″N 3°00′42″W	Category B	818	Upload Photo
Arniston Policies, Sunken Garden, Stone Bench				55°49′15″N 3°04′34″W	Category B	45145	Upload Photo
Borthwick, Bridge Over Gore Water				55°49′37″N 3°00′42″W	Category C(S)	45148	Upload another image See more images
Borthwick Manse, Including Gatepiers, Boundary Walls And Outbuildings				55°49′31″N 3°00′34″W	Category B	45150	Upload another image
Gorebridge, 43 Powdermill Brae Including Railings And Piers				55°50′15″N 3°02′42″W	Category C(S)	45170	Upload Photo
Harvieston Farm, Outbuildings				55°49′52″N 3°02′25″W	Category C(S)	45175	Upload Photo
Mountskip Farm House, Including Outbuildings, Gatepiers, Gates And Boundary Walls				55°50′40″N 3°00′53″W	Category C(S)	45183	Upload Photo
Vogrie House				55°51′30″N 2°59′26″W	Category A	799	Upload another image See more images
Vogrie House Walled Garden				55°51′26″N 2°59′49″W	Category B	802	Upload Photo
Currie Bridge				55°49′35″N 3°00′20″W	Category C(S)	45155	Upload Photo
Gorebridge, 20-22 Hunterfield Road, Church, (Struthers Memorial Church) Including Gates, Gatepiers And Boundary Wall				55°50′35″N 3°02′51″W	Category B	45157	Upload Photo
Gorebridge, Stobsmill House, Including Boundary Wall				55°50′22″N 3°02′53″W	Category C(S)	45172	Upload Photo
Middleton Mains, The Dugin				55°48′42″N 2°59′08″W	Category C(S)	45182	Upload Photo
Arniston Policies, Arniston Mains Farmhouse Including Gatepiers And Boundary Walls				55°49′53″N 3°03′56″W	Category B	45130	Upload Photo
Arniston Policies, East Lodge Including Railings And Piers				55°49′27″N 3°03′53″W	Category B	45133	Upload Photo
Arniston Policies, Rustic Bridge No 1 Over Purvies Hill Burn				55°49′15″N 3°04′50″W	Category C(S)	45135	Upload Photo
Arniston Policies, Rustic Bridge No 2 Over Purvies Hill Burn				55°49′14″N 3°04′54″W	Category C(S)	45136	Upload Photo
Arniston Policies, Rustic Bridge No 3 Over Purvies Hill Burn				55°49′14″N 3°04′57″W	Category C(S)	45137	Upload Photo
Arniston Policies, Sunken Garden, Ornamental Urn				55°49′15″N 3°04′35″W	Category C(S)	45142	Upload Photo
Newlandburn House, Including Boundary Walls And Gatepiers				55°51′10″N 3°00′52″W	Category B	6645	Upload Photo
50 Dewartown, Oak View				55°51′58″N 2°59′42″W	Category C(S)	4908	Upload Photo
9 Dewartown				55°51′59″N 2°59′39″W	Category B	790	Upload Photo
Vogrie House, West Lodge, Including Railings, Gates And Gatepiers				55°51′25″N 3°00′02″W	Category B	800	Upload Photo
Vogrie House, Cottage At Walled Garden				55°51′28″N 2°59′50″W	Category C(S)	803	Upload Photo
Borthwick Castle, Including Outer Walls And Gatehouse				55°49′36″N 3°00′26″W	Category A	805	Upload another image See more images
Arniston Policies, Garden Urn				55°49′25″N 3°04′47″W	Category B	809	Upload Photo
Gorebridge, 37 And 39 Powdermill Brae, Bellvue, Including Boundary Wall And Railings				55°50′16″N 3°02′42″W	Category C(S)	45168	Upload Photo
Gorebridge, Stobsmills House, Walled Garden				55°50′21″N 3°02′55″W	Category C(S)	45173	Upload Photo
Harvieston House				55°49′57″N 3°02′27″W	Category C(S)	45176	Upload Photo
Arniston Policies, Arniston Home Farm Farmhouse				55°49′26″N 3°04′13″W	Category C(S)	45128	Upload Photo
Arniston Policies, Rustic Bridge No 4 Over Purvies Hill Burn				55°49′13″N 3°05′00″W	Category C(S)	45138	Upload Photo
Currie House, Including Gates, Gatepiers And Boundary Walls				55°49′40″N 3°00′19″W	Category B	6363	Upload Photo
54 Dewartown, Rose Cottage				55°51′57″N 2°59′43″W	Category B	4909	Upload Photo
Vogrie House North Lodge Including Railings, Gates And Gatepiers				55°51′53″N 2°59′44″W	Category C(S)	801	Upload Photo
Wester Middleton Farm (Old Middleton Inn), Including Boundary Wall And Gatepiers				55°48′39″N 3°01′05″W	Category C(S)	807	Upload Photo
Arniston Policies, South (Cougar) Gate				55°49′10″N 3°04′28″W	Category B	812	Upload Photo
Gorebridge, 45A And 45B Main Street, Including Boundary Wall And Railings				55°50′28″N 3°02′52″W	Category C(S)	49673	Upload Photo
Arniston Policies, Sunken Garden, Rustic Bridge To West Over Purvies Hill Burn				55°49′16″N 3°04′37″W	Category B	45144	Upload Photo
Gorebridge, 19 And 21 Main Street				55°50′30″N 3°02′51″W	Category C(S)	45161	Upload Photo
Gorebridge, 36, 38 And 40 Main Street				55°50′29″N 3°02′53″W	Category C(S)	45163	Upload Photo
Harvieston Lodge, Gates, Gatepiers And Boundary Walls				55°50′05″N 3°02′52″W	Category B	45178	Upload Photo
Middleton Hall Walled Garden				55°48′44″N 3°00′36″W	Category B	45181	Upload Photo
Shank Garden, Including Walled Garden And Remains Of Shank House				55°50′23″N 3°03′55″W	Category C(S)	45185	Upload Photo
Arniston Policies, Summer-House				55°49′24″N 3°04′37″W	Category C(S)	45141	Upload Photo
Arniston Policies, Sunken Garden, Rustic Bridge To East Over Purvies Hill Burn				55°49′13″N 3°04′35″W	Category B	45143	Upload Photo
Borthwick Kirk (Church Of Scotland)				55°49′32″N 3°00′33″W	Category B	804	Upload Photo
Loquhariot Dovecot				55°50′12″N 3°00′21″W	Category B	815	Upload Photo
Borthwick Churchyard				55°49′33″N 3°00′33″W	Category C(S)	45149	Upload Photo
Borthwick Manse, Old Stables				55°49′31″N 3°00′33″W	Category C(S)	45151	Upload Photo
Castleton Farmhouse, Including Gatepiers, Gates And Boundary Walls				55°48′51″N 3°04′06″W	Category C(S)	45153	Upload Photo
Gorebridge, 13 Hunterfield Road				55°50′34″N 3°02′53″W	Category C(S)	45158	Upload Photo
Gorebridge, 47 And 49 Powdermill Brae, Gore Cottage, Including Boundary Wall And Railings				55°50′15″N 3°02′41″W	Category C(S)	45171	Upload another image
Wester Middleton Farm Cartshed And Granary				55°48′39″N 3°01′06″W	Category C(S)	45187	Upload Photo
Middleton Hall South West Lodge, Wester Middleton				55°48′37″N 3°00′58″W	Category C(S)	6619	Upload Photo
Vogrie House, Former Stables				55°51′33″N 2°59′21″W	Category B	798	Upload Photo
Arniston Policies, South Lodge				55°49′07″N 3°04′28″W	Category C(S)	813	Upload Photo
Arniston Policies, Sunken Garden, Stream Ornament				55°49′16″N 3°04′42″W	Category C(S)	45146	Upload Photo
Gorebridge, 14 Main Street, Lonach				55°50′31″N 3°02′52″W	Category C(S)	45160	Upload Photo
Gorebridge Post Office, Main Street				55°50′28″N 3°02′52″W	Category C(S)	45166	Upload another image
Arniston Policies, Old Kennels				55°49′29″N 3°03′52″W	Category C(S)	45134	Upload Photo
20 Dewartown, Time Cottage				55°52′02″N 2°59′37″W	Category C(S)	794	Upload Photo
Currie Mains, Including Ruined Cottage And Boundary Walls				55°49′29″N 3°00′23″W	Category B	46172	Upload Photo

== Key ==
The scheme for classifying buildings in Scotland is:

- Category A: "buildings of national or international importance, either architectural or historic; or fine, little-altered examples of some particular period, style or building type."
- Category B: "buildings of regional or more than local importance; or major examples of some particular period, style or building type, which may have been altered."
- Category C: "buildings of local importance; lesser examples of any period, style, or building type, as originally constructed or moderately altered; and simple traditional buildings which group well with other listed buildings."

In March 2016 there were 47,288 listed buildings in Scotland. Of these, 8% were Category A, and 50% were Category B, with the remaining 42% being Category C.

== See also ==
- List of listed buildings in Midlothian
