= John Clerk (merchant) =

Scottish merchant

John Clerk of Penicuik (1611–1674) was a Scottish merchant noted for maintaining a comprehensive archive of family papers, now held by the National Archives of Scotland and the National Library of Scotland.

== Background ==
Born in Montrose, he was the son of merchant William Clerk (d.1620), and was baptised by Alexander Forbes, the Bishop of Caithness, at Fettercairn on 22 December 1611.

He was a person of great ability and of an enterprising commercial spirit. He settled in Paris in 1634, and, in a few years, acquired a very considerable fortune. Collaborating with Robert Inglis, he became the main or sole factor for Edinburgh merchants in Paris. Returning to Scotland in 1646, he purchased the lands (see Penicuik Policies) and barony of Penicuik, in Midlothian, which have ever since continued to be the residence and title of this family.

== International exchange ==
Clerk bought paintings in Paris, some from the collections of Cardinal Richelieu, and sold them to William Kerr, 3rd Earl of Lothian. The Earl of Moray was another of Clerk's customers. Making international transfers of money for clients by bills of exchange depended on a network of merchant contacts, including John Jousie and Robert Inglis based in London.

== Newbiggin House at Penicuik ==
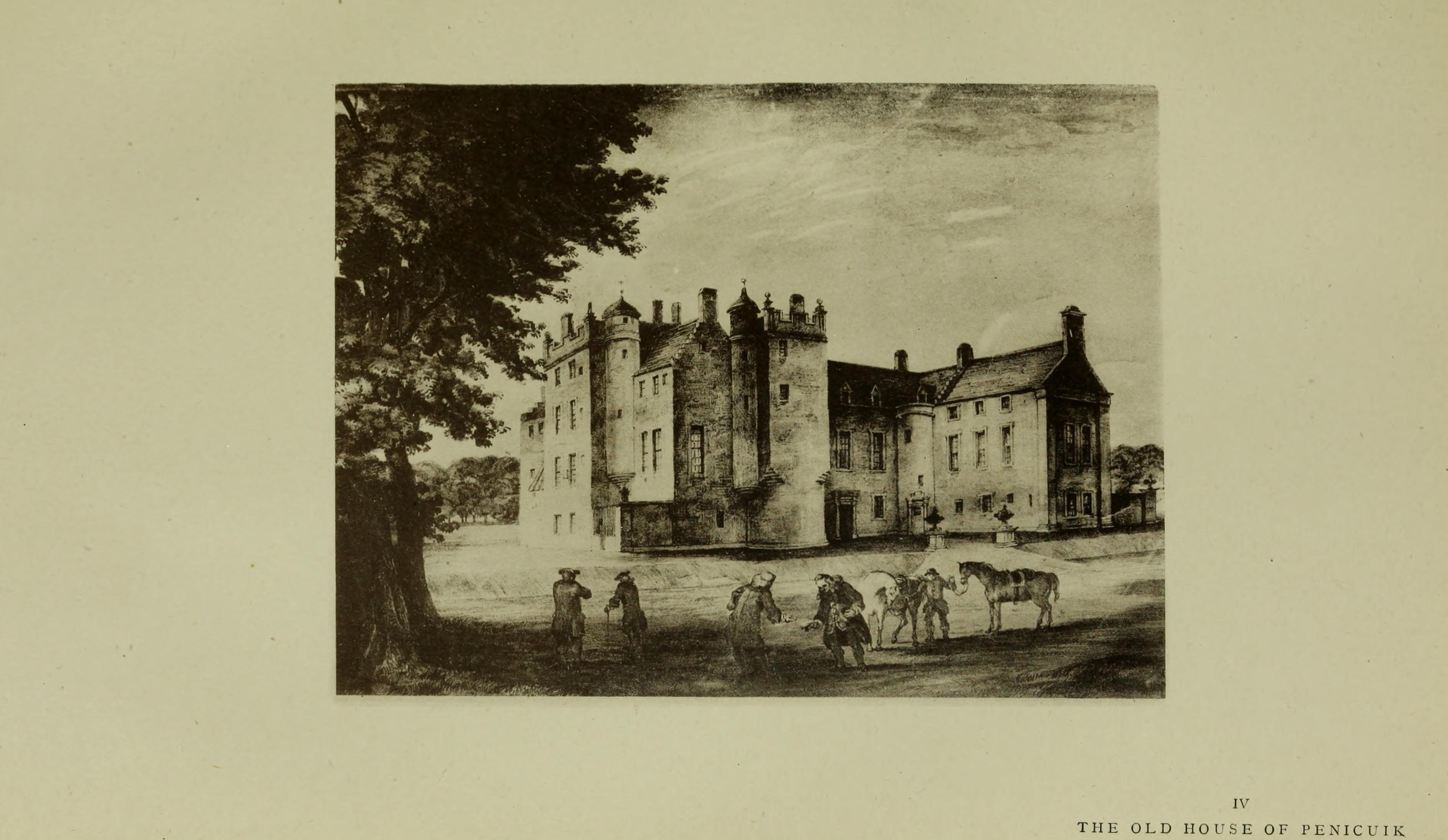
Newbiggin House was demolished to make way for Penicuik House

Clerk made his home at Newbiggin House at Penicuik, a fortified house built or rebuilt by John Preston of Fentonbarns which near stood the site of Penicuik House. Clerk extended the old house with the advice of a mason John Thomson. He had a new oven built using two cart loads of specially selected tufa stone from North Berwick. The same stone had been used for ovens at Holyroodhouse in the 16th century. A carpenter, James Sandelands, made drawers for his pine wardrobe and picture frames. Some carnation striped Worsted wool wall hangings for the house were woven in the Canongate by James Crommie. Clerk criticised Willie Gray, who slated the roof of Newbiggin for him in 1658, as "a deceiving cobbling knave". Clerk built a new dovecote at Newbiggin in April 1672. He paid Thomas Cosh to fetch and feed doves from nearby landowners, from Clerk's small dovecot in the gable end of the stable, and from the nesting holes built in the main house.

Nails for his building projects were supplied by two "nail wives", Elspeth and Isobell Fermer. Clerk bought plum and ash trees from Matthew Mitchell in Dalkeith for the garden and orchards of Newbiggin. He employed a shoe maker or "cordiner", Thomas Robb, who would stay at Newbiggin and make shoes for the family. Clerk recorded in his account book in 1670 that he paid Robb "too much, he being but a faking rascal".

Clerk attended the weddings of his servants at the kirk of Penicuik, and recorded expenses he paid towards the food and entertainment "at the brydell" for himself and other members of the family and household. On 21 June 1672 Jennet Lourie married George Pennycooke and Clerk contributed 12 shillings each for Luckie, Helen Gray, Helen Clark, and Nans Clerk.

== Marriages and family ==
In 1647 Clerk married Mary Gray, fourth daughter of Sir William Gray of Pittendrum (brother-in-law to John Smith of Grothill), by whom he had five sons and five daughters. She had a study at Newbiggin and kept a household account book, but this does not survive. By this marriage the Clerk family inherited the "Penicuik Jewels" which are thought to have belonged to Geillis Mowbray, a companion of Mary, Queen of Scots.

On 27 January 1670 John Clerk married his second wife, Elizabeth Johnston, at Edinburgh's Trinity College Kirk.

On his death in 1674 he was succeeded by his eldest son, Sir John Clerk, 1st Baronet.

== See also ==
- Clerk baronets
