= List of listed buildings in Midlothian =

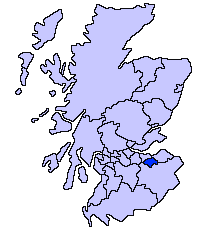
Midlothian shown within Scotland

This is a list of listed buildings in Midlothian. The list is split out by parish.

- List of listed buildings in Bonnyrigg And Lasswade, Midlothian
- List of listed buildings in Borthwick, Midlothian
- List of listed buildings in Carrington, Midlothian
- List of listed buildings in Cockpen, Midlothian
- List of listed buildings in Cranston, Midlothian
- List of listed buildings in Crichton, Midlothian
- List of listed buildings in Dalkeith, Midlothian
- List of listed buildings in Fala And Soutra, Midlothian
- List of listed buildings in Glencorse, Midlothian
- List of listed buildings in Humbie, Midlothian
- List of listed buildings in Inveresk, Midlothian
- List of listed buildings in Lasswade, Midlothian
- List of listed buildings in Loanhead, Midlothian
- List of listed buildings in Newbattle, Midlothian
- List of listed buildings in Newton, Midlothian
- List of listed buildings in Penicuik, Midlothian
- List of listed buildings in Temple, Midlothian

== See also ==
- Scheduled monuments in Midlothian
