= List of listed buildings in Newbattle, Midlothian =

This is a list of listed buildings in the parish of Newbattle in Midlothian, Scotland.

== List ==
Name	Location	Date listed	Grid ref. (Note: Sometimes known as OSGB36, the grid reference (where provided) is based on the British national grid reference system used by the Ordnance Survey. • "Guide to National Grid". Ordnance Survey. • "Get-a-map". Ordnance Survey.)	Geo-coordinates	Notes	LB number (Note: Historic Environment Scotland assign a unique alphanumeric identifier to each designated site in Scotland, for listed buildings this always begins with "LB", for example "LB12345".)	Image
Newbattle Abbey Policies, South Sundial				55°52′58″N 3°03′56″W	Category A	14563	Upload another image
Newbattle Abbey Policies, Maiden Bridge				55°53′16″N 3°03′43″W	Category S	14564	Upload Photo
Gorebridge, 70, 72, 74, Hunterfield Road, Newbyres Row				55°50′42″N 3°03′02″W	Category C(S)	46964	Upload Photo
Newbattle, Newbattle Road, Newbattle Graveyard Including Boundary Walls				55°53′04″N 3°04′16″W	Category B	46970	Upload Photo
Newtongrange, Main Street, Newtongrange Parish Church (Church Of Scotland) Including Church Hall And Boundary Wall				55°51′59″N 3°03′58″W	Category C(S)	46972	Upload another image See more images
Newbattle, Newbattle Road, Lamb's Nursery, Former Newbattle Abbey Walled Garden				55°53′08″N 3°04′15″W	Category B	19485	Upload Photo
Newbattle, Newbattle Road, Newbattle Abbey Gardens, Archbishop Leighton's House				55°53′03″N 3°04′09″W	Category B	14543	Upload Photo
Newtongrange, 1 - 12 (Inclusive Numbers) Lingerwood Cottages Including Boundary Wall				55°51′42″N 3°03′53″W	Category C(S)	14602	Upload Photo
Gorebridge, Hunterfield Road, Gorebridge Parish Church (Church Of Scotland) Including Church Hall And Boundary Wall				55°50′46″N 3°03′03″W	Category C(S)	46965	Upload another image
Newbattle Road And Abbey Road, Gatepiers And Quadrant Walls				55°53′12″N 3°04′28″W	Category C(S)	46969	Upload Photo
Newbattle Abbey Policies, Fernery				55°53′05″N 3°04′11″W	Category B	19257	Upload Photo
Newbattle, Newbattle Road, Newbattle Parish Church (Church Of Scotland)				55°52′59″N 3°04′15″W	Category B	14558	Upload another image
Newbattle, Newbattle Road, Old Bridge				55°52′48″N 3°04′13″W	Category A	14568	Upload another image
Newbattle, Newbattle Road, 1 - 5 (Inclusive Numbers) Riverside Cottages				55°52′50″N 3°04′14″W	Category B	14569	Upload Photo
Blinkbonny Farmhouse And Steading, Including Chimneystack				55°51′11″N 3°01′18″W	Category C(S)	46960	Upload Photo
Southside Including Boundary Wall				55°51′49″N 3°00′33″W	Category B	14546	Upload Photo
Newtongrange, 37 - 42 (Inclusive Numbers) Main Street, Monkwood				55°52′02″N 3°04′00″W	Category C(S)	14601	Upload Photo
Newtongrange, Lady Victoria Colliery, Manager's Office				55°51′43″N 3°03′54″W	Category B	14603	Upload Photo
Fordel Mains Farmhouse Including Walled Garden				55°53′21″N 2°59′51″W	Category C(S)	46962	Upload Photo
Fordel Park, Walled Garden				55°53′43″N 2°59′09″W	Category C(S)	46963	Upload Photo
Newtongrange, Main Street, The Dean Tavern				55°52′08″N 3°04′08″W	Category C(S)	46971	Upload another image See more images
Lothianbridge, Newbattle Viaduct				55°52′19″N 3°04′38″W	Category B	14544	Upload Photo
Lothianbridge, The Sun Inn				55°52′22″N 3°04′41″W	Category C(S)	14545	Upload Photo
Newbattle Abbey Policies, Grotto And Ice-House				55°52′54″N 3°04′03″W	Category B	14565	Upload Photo
Fordel Dean, Including Ancillary Buildings And Boundary Wall				55°53′17″N 2°59′04″W	Category C(S)	46961	Upload Photo
Newbattle, Newbattle Road, Newbattle House Including Boundary Wall				55°52′58″N 3°04′15″W	Category B	14559	Upload Photo
Newbattle, Newbattle Abbey				55°52′58″N 3°04′01″W	Category A	14561	Upload another image
Newbattle Abbey Policies, Newbattle Road, Monkland Wall				55°52′52″N 3°04′15″W	Category A	14566	Upload Photo
Newbattle Abbey Policies, Port Lodge Including Quadrant Colonnades And Gatepiers				55°52′53″N 3°04′15″W	Category A	14567	Upload another image
Easthouses Colliery, Airshaft East Of Kippilaw				55°53′10″N 3°02′30″W	Category C(S)	49651	Upload Photo
Newbattle, 20 Newbattle Road, The Old Sun Inn				55°52′54″N 3°04′17″W	Category B	14560	Upload Photo
Newbattle Abbey Policies, North Sundial				55°53′00″N 3°03′58″W	Category A	14562	Upload another image
Lothianbridge, Craigesk House Including Boundary Wall And Entrance Gates				55°52′18″N 3°04′44″W	Category C(S)	46966	Upload Photo
Newbattle Abbey Policies, Lothian Burial Ground				55°53′02″N 3°04′09″W	Category C(S)	46967	Upload Photo

== Key ==
The scheme for classifying buildings in Scotland is:

- Category A: "buildings of national or international importance, either architectural or historic; or fine, little-altered examples of some particular period, style or building type."
- Category B: "buildings of regional or more than local importance; or major examples of some particular period, style or building type, which may have been altered."
- Category C: "buildings of local importance; lesser examples of any period, style, or building type, as originally constructed or moderately altered; and simple traditional buildings which group well with other listed buildings."

In March 2016 there were 47,288 listed buildings in Scotland. Of these, 8% were Category A, and 50% were Category B, with the remaining 42% being Category C.

== See also ==
- List of listed buildings in Midlothian
