= Penicuik House =

Grand estate house in Penicuik, Midlothian, Scotland

Coordinates: 55.8197°N 3.2508°W

Designations

Inventory of Gardens and Designed Landscapes in Scotland
- Official name: Penicuik
- Designated: 30 June 1987
- Reference no.: GDL00311

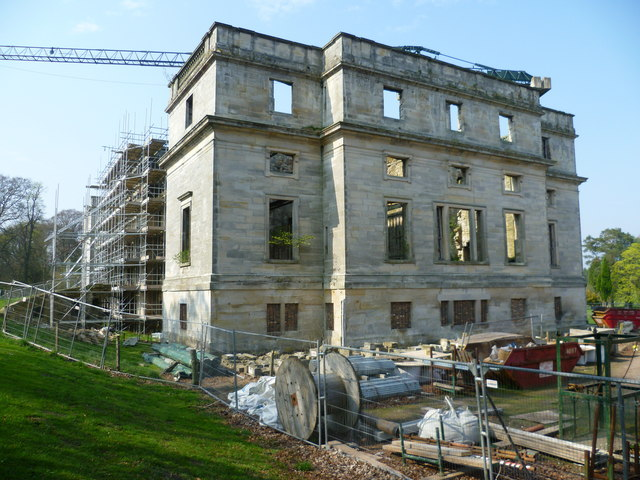
Penicuik House restoration, 2011

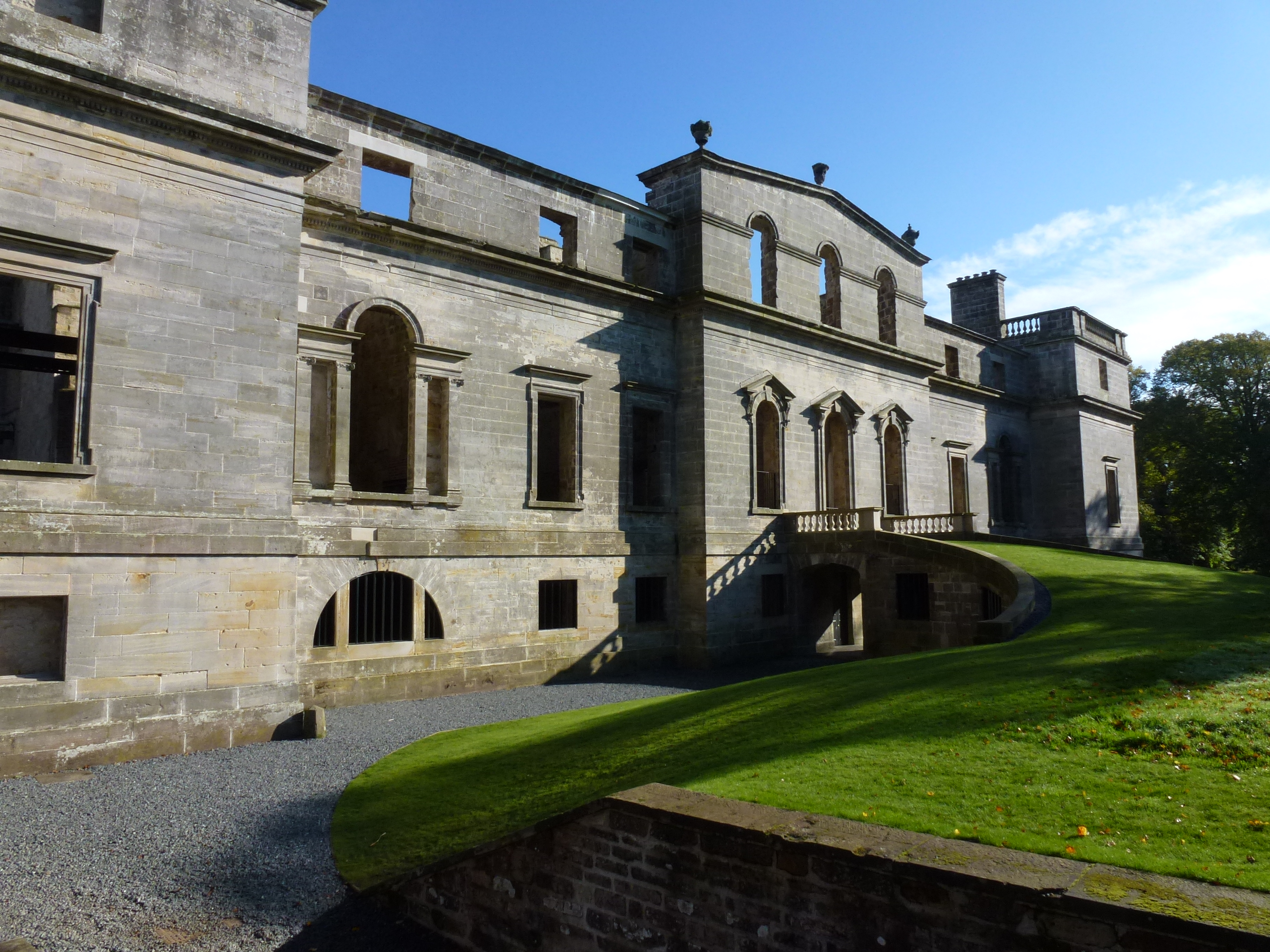
Penicuik House, 2014

Penicuik House (alternative spellings in use until mid 19th century: Penycuik, Pennycuik) survives as the shell of a formerly grand estate house in Penicuik, Midlothian, Scotland. The 18th-century palladian mansion (at NT2172659208) was built on the site of an earlier house by Sir James Clerk, 3rd Baronet. It was destroyed by fire in 1899 and a major restoration, stabilising the ruin, was completed in 2014 by G Brown Stonemasons.

Old Penicuik House and New Penicuik House (the former stables block in which the Clerk family were living even before the fire) are both designated Category A listed buildings by Historic Environment Scotland.

View of Alexander Runciman's Ossian's Hall by an unknown artist (c.1880)

== History ==
The merchant John Clerk returned to Scotland from France in 1646 and purchased the estate and barony of Penicuik, the "Penicuik Policies", including the older Newbiggin House, which he extended and improved. The estate became the residence and title of his descendants.

From 1700 to 1730, the laird Sir John Clerk of Penicuik planted 300,000 trees on the estate.

The current Penicuik House was built in 1761 by Sir James Clerk, the 4th Laird of Penicuik and 3rd Baronet. Clerk had travelled widely, especially in Italy, and had studied Italian architecture. Now a roofless shell, it is constructed of ashlar, it has a central hexastyle portico with two-way stair, piano nobile, basement and Palladian windows. The interior was gutted by fire in 1899, but formerly had many fine rooms.

The house was a great meeting place for figures of the Scottish Enlightenment, who came to view its collection of paintings, including a noted ceiling painting of Ossian's Hall and four scenes from the life of Saint Margaret by Alexander Runciman.

== Replica of Arthur's O'on ==
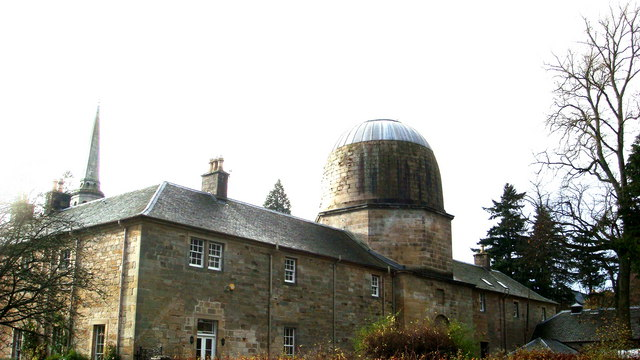
Penicuik House stable block, with domed dovecote; a replica of Arthur's O'on.

The deliberate destruction of Arthur's O'on so appalled Sir James Clerk, that in 1760 he decided to have a dovecote built, as an exact replica of the temple, on his stable block at Penicuik House.

== See also ==
- Clerk baronets
- Alexander Gordon (antiquary)
- List of Category A listed buildings in Midlothian
- List of country and estate houses in Scotland
- List of listed buildings in Penicuik, Midlothian
- 18th-century Western domes
