= List of listed buildings in Carrington, Midlothian =

This is a list of listed buildings in the parish of Carrington in Midlothian, Scotland.

== List ==
Name	Location	Date Listed	Grid Ref. (Note: Sometimes known as OSGB36, the grid reference (where provided) is based on the British national grid reference system used by the Ordnance Survey. • "Guide to National Grid". Ordnance Survey. • "Get-a-map". Ordnance Survey.)	Geo-coordinates	Notes	LB Number (Note: Historic Environment Scotland assign a unique alphanumeric identifier to each designated site in Scotland, for listed buildings this always begins with "LB", for example "LB12345".)	Image
Carrington Village, Carrington Mains Steading				55°49′59″N 3°05′20″W	Category B	680	Upload Photo
Whitehill Policies, Whitehill House, Former St Joseph's Institution				55°50′46″N 3°07′34″W	Category A	687	Upload Photo
Carrington Village, 1-8 (Inclusive) Primrose Gardens				55°50′02″N 3°05′19″W	Category C(S)	46087	Upload another image
Shewington Farmhouse, Including Bothy				55°49′53″N 3°08′27″W	Category C(S)	46091	Upload Photo
Whitehill Policies, St Mary's Lodge And Gatepiers And Gates To Whitehill House				55°50′41″N 3°07′14″W	Category C(S)	46092	Upload Photo
Thornton Farm, Dovecot				55°50′32″N 3°07′42″W	Category B	45568	Upload Photo
Carrington Village, Carrington Kirk, Including Gates, Gatepiers And Boundary Walls				55°50′01″N 3°05′22″W	Category B	6647	Upload another image See more images
Carrington, Main Street, 4 Carrington Mains Cottages Including Boundary Wall				55°49′59″N 3°05′26″W	Category C(S)	682	Upload Photo
Carrington Mill, Bridge To West Over Redside Burn				55°49′26″N 3°05′25″W	Category C(S)	688	Upload Photo
Broachrigg Farmhouse, Including Gate And Boundary Wall				55°50′14″N 3°08′26″W	Category C(S)	46084	Upload Photo
Carrington Village, Carrington Mains Farmhouse Including Gates, Gatepiers And Boundary Walls				55°49′58″N 3°05′21″W	Category C(S)	46086	Upload Photo
Carrington, Main Street, 2 Carrington Mains Cottages				55°50′00″N 3°05′20″W	Category C(S)	679	Upload Photo
Carrington Burial Ground, Including Whitehill Aisle (Ramsay Mausoleum), Gatepiers And Boundary Walls				55°50′20″N 3°05′04″W	Category B	685	Upload another image
Edgelaw Reservoir, Including Dam, Overflow, Upstand Shaft And Bridges				55°48′39″N 3°06′44″W	Category B	46088	Upload Photo
Parduvine Farmhouse, Cartshed And Granary, And Boundary Walls				55°50′13″N 3°06′58″W	Category B	46089	Upload Photo
Redside, Farmhouse And Steading				55°49′22″N 3°06′31″W	Category C(S)	46090	Upload Photo
Thornton Farm, Farmhouse				55°50′33″N 3°07′46″W	Category C(S)	45567	Upload Photo
Carrington Village, Manse Road, Carrington Hill, Formerly Carrington Manse, Including Ancillary Buildings, Walled Garden, Gates, Gatepiers And Boundary Walls				55°49′50″N 3°05′33″W	Category C(S)	684	Upload Photo
Carrington Village, Carrington Kirk, Session House				55°50′00″N 3°05′21″W	Category B	677	Upload Photo
Arniston Policies, Bridge Over River South Esk				55°50′21″N 3°04′10″W	Category B	46083	Upload Photo
Carrington Mill And Mill Cottage				55°49′28″N 3°05′20″W	Category C(S)	46085	Upload Photo
Carrington, Main Street, 3 Carrington Mains Cottages				55°49′59″N 3°05′25″W	Category C(S)	681	Upload Photo
Thornton Farm, Ice House				55°50′31″N 3°07′45″W	Category C(S)	45569	Upload Photo
Carrington Bridge, Over Redside Burn				55°49′25″N 3°05′10″W	Category B	686	Upload Photo
Carrington, Main Street, 1 Carrington Mains Cottages				55°50′00″N 3°05′18″W	Category C(S)	678	Upload Photo
Carrington Village, 5 Main Street, Including Wall To East				55°49′58″N 3°05′27″W	Category B	683	Upload Photo
Whitehill Policies, Bridge To N Of Whitehill House				55°50′52″N 3°07′32″W	Category C(S)	65	Upload Photo

== Key ==
The scheme for classifying buildings in Scotland is:

- Category A: "buildings of national or international importance, either architectural or historic; or fine, little-altered examples of some particular period, style or building type."
- Category B: "buildings of regional or more than local importance; or major examples of some particular period, style or building type, which may have been altered."
- Category C: "buildings of local importance; lesser examples of any period, style, or building type, as originally constructed or moderately altered; and simple traditional buildings which group well with other listed buildings."

In March 2016 there were 47,288 listed buildings in Scotland. Of these, 8% were Category A, and 50% were Category B, with the remaining 42% being Category C.

== See also ==
- List of listed buildings in Midlothian
