= Arthur's O'on =

Probable Roman temple near Falkirk, Scotland, destroyed in 1743

Coordinates: 56.0245°N 3.7992°W

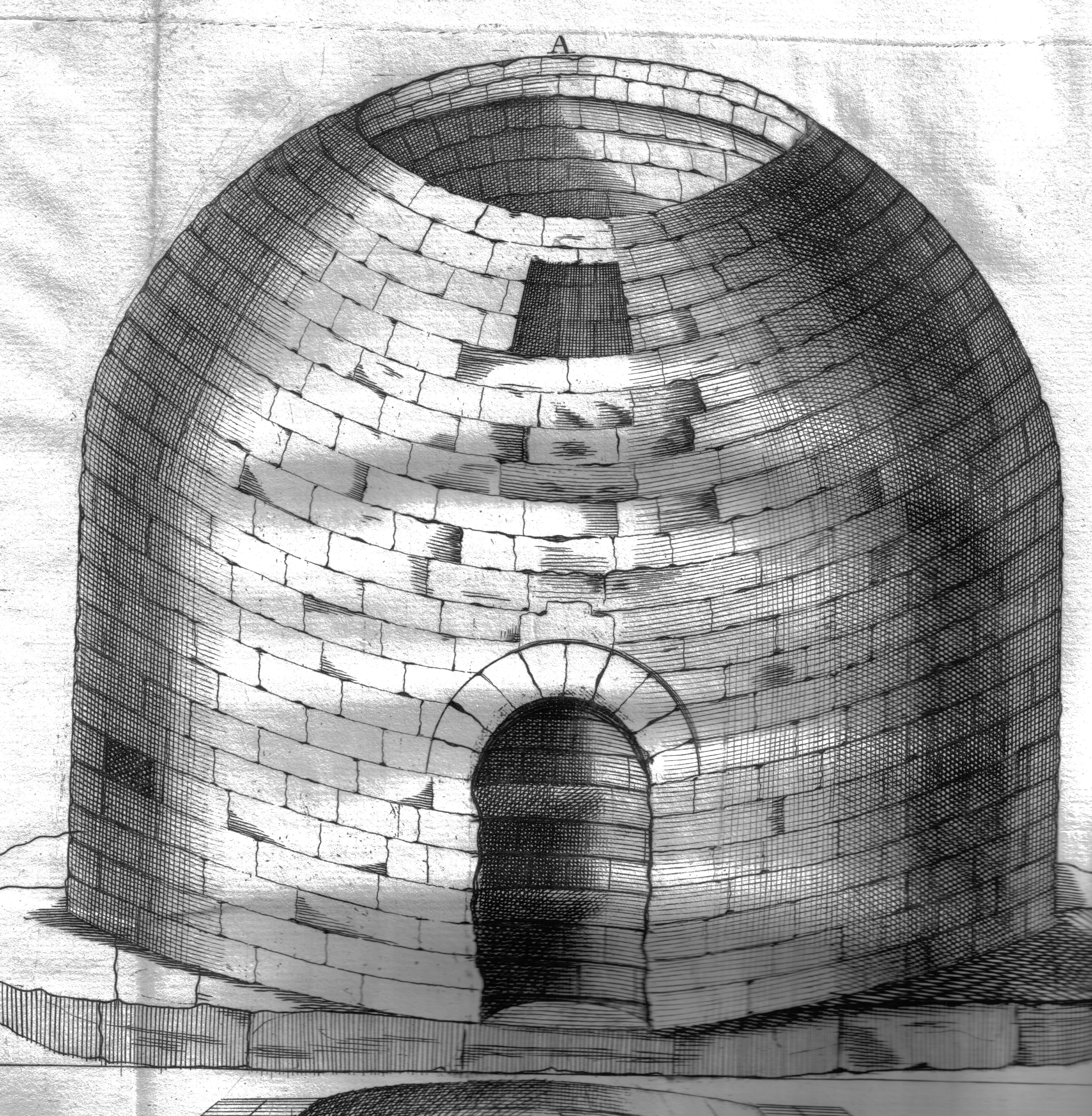
Arthur's O'on in 1726 from Alexander Gordon's book Itinerarium Septentrionale

Arthur's O'on (Scots: Oven) was a stone building thought to be Roman temple that, until 1743, stood on rising ground above the north bank of the River Carron not far from the old Carron ironworks in Stenhousemuir, near Falkirk, Scotland. The structure is thought to be the 'stone house' which gave its name to Stenhousemuir. Early historians discussed historical and mythical associations with the site and by 1200 the estate of Stenhouse on which it stood had been named after it.

== Construction myths ==
One manuscript of the Historia Brittonum by Nennius refers to Arthur's O'on as a "round house of polished stone" by the River Carron, attributing it to Carausius, in a passage primarily referring to Septimius Severus. John of Fordun in the 14th century recorded in his Chronica Gentis Scotorum that the structure was built by Julius Caesar to mark the northern limit of the Roman Empire, and another more fanciful belief that was once popular was that Caesar used it as a secure quarters in which he slept, the building being dismantled stone by stone to be re-assembled at the emperor's next stop for the night. George Buchanan in the 16th century saw it as a memorial to some great Roman victory over the Scots. In this tradition, the building commemorated a victory of the Roman emperor Vespasian at Camelon and his capture of the jewelled crown and regalia of the Pictish kings.

== Names ==
In a Charter to Newbattle Abbey (Midlothian) in 1293 a reference is made to furnus Arthur (Latin for "Arthur's Oven"), indicating that it was a well established feature and of unknown origin even at that relatively early date.

Henry Sinclair, Dean of Glasgow about 1560, calls it Arthur's Huif; and Alexander Gordon speaks of it as Arthur's Hoff. Julius's Hoff is also recorded. Hoff and Huif (cf. Old English hof: "house", "hall") are Scots for a house or hall.

== Setting ==
A road to Alloa and Airth passed by the back of the Forge Row and through the Stenhouse estate; Arthur's O'on stood on the north-east side of this road. Early historians often discuss it along with the Roman fort at Camelon.

The building was on the declivity of rising ground, supported by a basement of stones, projecting out from below the lowest course of the building; it was so far from being upon a level area, that a great part of the basement, and four courses of the stones on the south side, were hidden in the earth. The marks of three or four steps, which may have formerly led from the ground to the entrance of the building, were visible at one time.

The traces of a broad ditch could be seen at one time on the northern side; suggesting that a regular vallum (rampart) and fosse (ditch) had once surrounded the building.

== Description ==
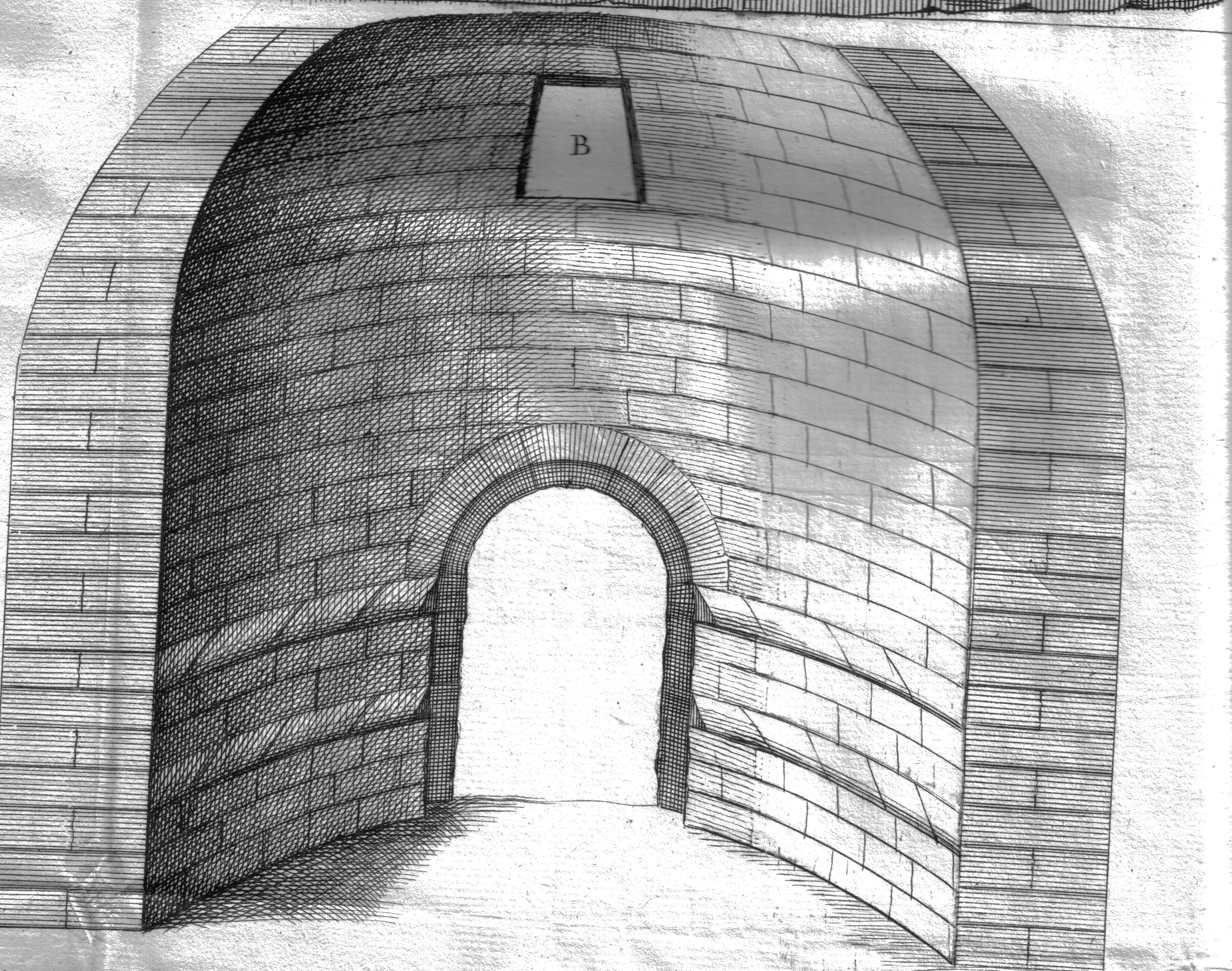
The interior of Arthur's O'on.

The O'on was built of dressed freestones which were not mortised into each other and no mortar was used. Each stone had a lewis hole in it to allow secure lifting with a hinged pair of metal callipers. In appearance the O'on was shaped like a beehive, being circular on plan with a domed roof. The perpendicular height, from the bottom to the top of the aperture, was 22 feet (6.7 m); the external circumference at the base, 88 ft (26.8 m); internal circumference, 61 ft (18.6 m); external diameter at the base, 28 ft (8.5 m); internal diameter, 19 ft 6 in (5.94 m); circumference of the aperture, 86 ft 1 in (26.24 m); diameter of the aperture, 11 ft 6 in (3.51 m); height of the door from its basis to the top of the arch 9 ft (2.7 m); breadth of the East facing door at the base, 6 ft (1.8 m); height, from the ground to the top of the key-stone of the door, 10 ft 6 in (3.20 m); breadth of the wall at the base, measuring at the door, 4 ft 3 in (1.30 m); thickness of the wall where the arch springs, 3 ft 7 in (1.09 m); and height of the basement on which the building stands, 4 ft 6 in (1.37 m). The door is said to have had an iron gate, the removal of which by the Monteiths of Cars brought a curse upon the family.

Round the interior of the building there were two string courses at distances of 4 and 6 ft (1.2 and 1.8 m) respectively above the paved stone floor, and in several places, notably over the door, there may have been much weathered carvings in which eagles and the goddess Victory are said to have been represented. A huge stone stood in the interior, possibly an altar or the base of a bronze statue. The O'on may date to the period of occupation of the Antonine Wall.

=== Carvings ===
The figure of a Roman eagle was at one time visible, chiselled upon the pavement. Other insignia of the Romans are said to have formerly ornamented its walls, but when Edward I was destroying all important Scottish antiquities, he was only induced to spare the 'temple beside Camelon', after the inhabitants of the neighbourhood had already destroyed all the Roman sculptures, and inscriptions which existed upon it. The initial letters J. A. M. P. M. P. T., were recorded by Sir Robert Sibbald, engraved on a stone inside the building, under a figure of Victory, with the head and part of the handle of a javelin. The following reading was suggested :- Julius Agricola Magnae Pictatis Monumentum Posuit Templum. The holes in some of the blocks may have only related to the method of raising the blocks into position during construction.

=== Archaeology ===
Various remains of antiquity have been discovered near its site, such as the stones of querns or handmills, made of a type of lava resembling that now obtained from the mill-stone quarries of Andernach on the Rhine; fragments of pottery, and the vestiges of what was supposed to have been a potter's kiln. The horns of 'great cows' were found, suggesting deliberate burials of religious significance. The antiquarian Edward Lhwyd presented the Revd Patrick Wodrow in 1699 with a 'patera' or pottery libation bowl that had been found near the O'on.

== Purpose ==
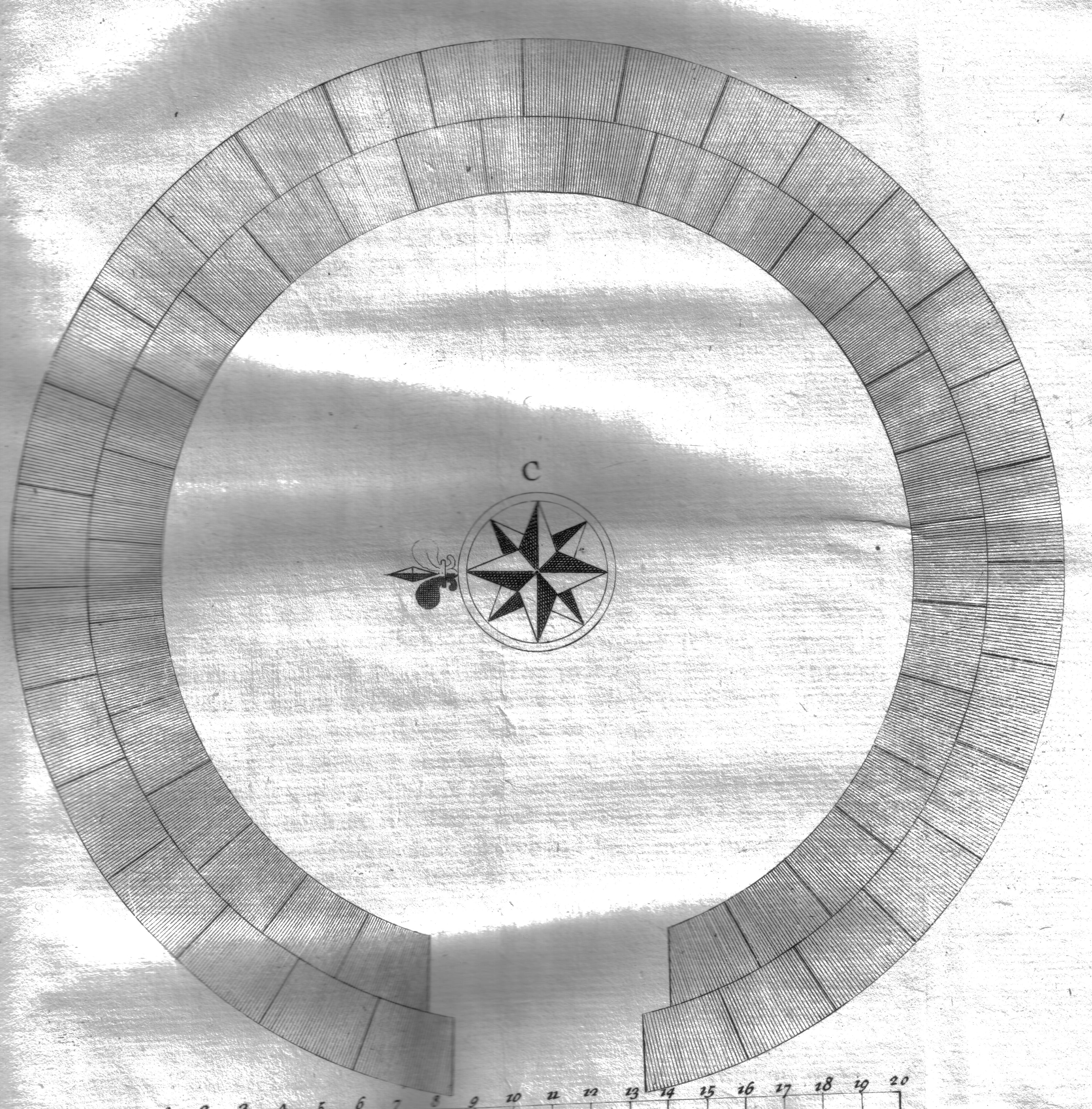
Interior ground plan of the temple.

The discovery in a chink of the masonry of a brass finger from a statue, suggested that the O'on was primarily a triumphal monument, or tropaeum, erected to commemorate a victory. The quality of the structure bears the stamp of legionary workmanship, being too elaborate for a purely local masons and it appears to have been deliberately sited to be visible from the Antonine Wall.

The building was, it seems, unique in Britain and, as suggested, most likely a temple as it was located too far from a fort or road to have been a bathhouse or mausoleum. Its proximity to a spring has resulted in the suggestion that it was dedicated to a water goddess. At the time of its destruction it was one of the best preserved Roman buildings in Britain.

A broken relief from Rose Hill on Hadrian's Wall depicts Victory, an eagle, and a round domed building under a tree, which may represent a structure like Arthur's O'on. Victory was normally worshipped in the forts, but the easiest interpretation is that the O'on was a tropaeum, an official monument dedicated to Victory, and also commemorating the campaign, led by Quintus Lollius Urbicus, that led to the establishment of the Antonine Wall.

== Destruction ==
It was demolished to line a mill dam on the River Carron by Sir Michael Bruce of Stenhouse in 1743, an act of vandalism that was reported to the Society of Antiquaries in London and led to paroxysms of rage in the correspondence of leading antiquarians. In mid-1748 the stones were swept away in a flood.

When these findings of the likely site of the stones of Arthur's O'on were announced by Burke's Peerage in the late 1980s there rose the possibility of recovery and reconstruction. However, since Scottish antiquities authorities do not consider the possible site of a buried mill dam as a "scheduled" site, and since the overall site is covered with thick concrete foundations, the prospects for actual recovery do not appear high. Of course, the suggestion that the Carron has changed course in this area has been questioned by other researchers.

Sir Walter Scott remarked, with respect to the destruction of this 'great glory of the Roman remains in Scotland,' that, had not the worthy proprietor thought fit to demolish it, it would have turned the heads of half the antiquaries in Scotland. The local minister 50 years later noted that ".... the building might have escaped demolition had he not been so poor, possessed of a numerous family of children, his income small, and a considerable amount of it derived from the mill."

Several members of the Society of Antiquaries tried to find out the foundation of the building in the 1870s, but without success. Its site, however, was thought to be a few yards to the north-east of the Forge Row, at the corner of an enclosure, about fifty feet square, on the estate of Stenhouse. The ground was then used as a washing-green.

== Penicuik House replica ==
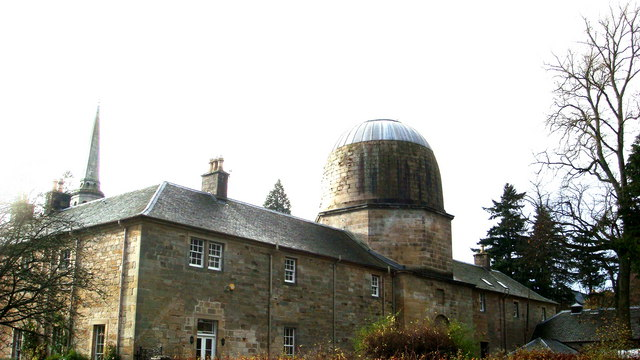
Penicuik House stable block, with domed dovecote replicating Arthur's O'on.

The deliberate destruction of Arthur's O'on had so appalled Sir James Clerk, that in 1767 his son, also Sir James Clerk, decided to have a dovecote built, as an exact replica of the temple, on his stable block at Penicuik House. The dovecote still exists.

== Antiquarian history ==
The first record is in the 9th century by Nennius, a Welsh historian, in his Historia Brittonum. He was a monk studying under Bishop Elfodd, and gave a brief description of the building, and asserted, without hesitation, that it was erected by the usurper Carausius, who assumed the purple in Britain in the year 284. He also mentioned that a triumphal arch was built near it, in honour of the same individual. It is shown on Timothy Pont's map, on that of John Adair and of Sir Robert Sibbald, who in the 16th century recorded it as a 'temple'. In 1723 it was described as being "in the form of a sugar loaf" in an account of Larbert parish, which adjoins Stenhousemuir. In 1719 Andrews Jelfe, an architect, visited and made careful drawings and measurements on behalf of the antiquarian William Stukeley, which were later published as part of a treatise on the O'on.
