= List of listed buildings in Temple, Midlothian =

This is a list of listed buildings in the parish of Temple in Midlothian, Scotland.

== List ==
Name	Location	Date Listed	Grid Ref. (Note: Sometimes known as OSGB36, the grid reference (where provided) is based on the British national grid reference system used by the Ordnance Survey. • "Guide to National Grid". Ordnance Survey. • "Get-a-map". Ordnance Survey.)	Geo-coordinates	Notes	LB Number (Note: Historic Environment Scotland assign a unique alphanumeric identifier to each designated site in Scotland, for listed buildings this always begins with "LB", for example "LB12345".)	Image
Rosebery House Policies, Episcopal Chapel				55°48′20″N 3°06′32″W	Category B	14627	Upload Photo
Rosebery House Policies, Lodge				55°48′21″N 3°06′45″W	Category B	14628	Upload Photo
Temple Village, Old Temple Kirk (Church Of The Knights Templars Of Balantrodoch) Including Boundary Wall And Gatepiers				55°49′01″N 3°05′40″W	Category B	14621	Upload Photo
Mauldslie Farmhouse And Steading				55°45′56″N 3°06′15″W	Category B	45814	Upload Photo
1 And 2 Mauldslie Farm Cottages				55°45′58″N 3°06′04″W	Category C(S)	45815	Upload Photo
Yorkston Farmhouse, Including Ancillary Structure, Gatepiers And Boundary Walls				55°47′54″N 3°05′40″W	Category C(S)	45832	Upload Photo
Rosebery House Policies, Main Entrance Gatepiers				55°48′19″N 3°06′47″W	Category B	14629	Upload another image
Rosebery House Policies, Home Farm				55°48′19″N 3°06′51″W	Category A	14630	Upload another image See more images
Arniston Policies, Ice House				55°49′10″N 3°04′45″W	Category C(S)	45806	Upload Photo
Braidwood Bridge Over River South Esk, B6372				55°49′08″N 3°05′22″W	Category B	45807	Upload Photo
Temple Farm Cottages				55°48′38″N 3°05′03″W	Category C(S)	45820	Upload Photo
Toxside Farmhouse Including Ancillary Structures, Gates, Gatepiers And Boundary Walls				55°46′27″N 3°08′56″W	Category B	45827	Upload Photo
Temple Village, The Mill House				55°49′04″N 3°05′42″W	Category B	18192	Upload Photo
Temple Village, 5 Main Street				55°49′00″N 3°05′31″W	Category C(S)	14649	Upload Photo
Temple Village, 21 Main Street				55°48′56″N 3°05′29″W	Category C(S)	14650	Upload Photo
Temple Village 25-27 (Odd Nos) Main Street				55°48′56″N 3°05′29″W	Category B	14651	Upload Photo
Temple Village, Temple Kirk Session House				55°49′02″N 3°05′39″W	Category B	14620	Upload Photo
Arniston Policies, Walled Garden, Including Gateways And Loggia				55°49′14″N 3°04′42″W	Category A	14625	Upload Photo
Esperston Farmhouse, Including Gatepiers				55°48′05″N 3°03′29″W	Category B	6644	Upload Photo
Upperside Limekiln, South				55°46′59″N 3°07′48″W	Category C(S)	45831	Upload Photo
Temple Village, Temple Kirk				55°49′03″N 3°05′40″W	Category B	14619	Upload another image
Broadhead Cottage				55°48′07″N 3°05′17″W	Category B	45809	Upload Photo
Fountainside Including Steading And Cart Shed				55°47′49″N 3°07′24″W	Category C(S)	45810	Upload Photo
Huntly Cot, Glede Knowe Sheep House				55°45′15″N 3°06′46″W	Category C(S)	45813	Upload Photo
Outerston Farm, Cartshed And Granary				55°48′07″N 3°04′12″W	Category B	45817	Upload Photo
Arniston Policies, Arniston Gardens House Including Gatepiers				55°49′12″N 3°04′37″W	Category B	45804	Upload Photo
Arniston Policies, Horace's Bridge Over River South Esk				55°49′09″N 3°05′17″W	Category B	45805	Upload Photo
Gladhouse Reservoir Including Dam, Weirs, Revetments, Gangway, Measuring House, Tweedaleburn Aqueduct And Bridges Over Tributaries				55°46′13″N 3°07′00″W	Category B	45811	Upload Photo
Hirendean Hill, Sheep Stell				55°44′58″N 3°07′14″W	Category C(S)	45812	Upload Photo
Temple Village, 23 Main Street				55°48′56″N 3°05′29″W	Category C(S)	45822	Upload Photo
Temple Village, 31 Main Street				55°48′55″N 3°05′29″W	Category C(S)	45823	Upload Photo
Temple Village, 32 Main Street				55°48′50″N 3°05′24″W	Category C(S)	45824	Upload Photo
Temple Village, Tradoch Hall (Former United Free Church)				55°48′51″N 3°05′25″W	Category C(S)	45826	Upload Photo
Toxside School, Including Boundary Walls				55°46′20″N 3°08′08″W	Category C(S)	45829	Upload Photo
Temple Village, Main Street, K6 Telephone Kiosk				55°48′56″N 3°05′30″W	Category B	14632	Upload Photo
Temple Village, Temple House Gateway				55°48′59″N 3°05′27″W	Category C(S)	14648	Upload Photo
Braidwood Farm Including Gates, Gatepiers And Boundary Walls				55°48′59″N 3°06′00″W	Category B	45808	Upload Photo
Millbank Cottage, Including Outbuilding And Walls				55°48′06″N 3°06′15″W	Category C(S)	45816	Upload Photo
Gladhouse, Gladhouse Villa				55°46′39″N 3°07′03″W	Category B	14633	Upload Photo
Outerston Farm, Cottage				55°48′06″N 3°04′12″W	Category C(S)	45818	Upload Photo
Temple Village, 14 Main Street, Temple Cottage, Including Ancillary Structure, Garden Walls And Steps				55°48′55″N 3°05′30″W	Category B	45821	Upload Photo
Temple Village, 34 Main Street				55°48′50″N 3°06′05″W	Category C(S)	45825	Upload Photo
Upperside Limekiln, North				55°47′09″N 3°07′48″W	Category C(S)	45830	Upload Photo
Arniston Polices, West Lodge, Including Gatepiers And Boundary Walls				55°49′21″N 3°05′15″W	Category B	18977	Upload Photo
Temple Village, 29 Main Street				55°48′56″N 3°05′29″W	Category C(S)	18193	Upload Photo
Rosebery House Including Boundary Walls And Gatepiers				55°48′18″N 3°06′36″W	Category C(S)	14626	Upload Photo
Temple Village, Temple Manse				55°49′02″N 3°05′41″W	Category C(S)	14622	Upload Photo
Rosebery Reservoir Including Dam, Overflow, Upstand Shaft And Bridge				55°48′04″N 3°06′06″W	Category B	45819	Upload Photo
Toxside Farm Cottages				55°46′24″N 3°08′45″W	Category C(S)	45828	Upload Photo

== Key ==
The scheme for classifying buildings in Scotland is:

- Category A: "buildings of national or international importance, either architectural or historic; or fine, little-altered examples of some particular period, style or building type."
- Category B: "buildings of regional or more than local importance; or major examples of some particular period, style or building type, which may have been altered."
- Category C: "buildings of local importance; lesser examples of any period, style, or building type, as originally constructed or moderately altered; and simple traditional buildings which group well with other listed buildings."

In March 2016 there were 47,288 listed buildings in Scotland. Of these, 8% were Category A, and 50% were Category B, with the remaining 42% being Category C.

== See also ==
- List of listed buildings in Midlothian
