= List of listed buildings in Loanhead, Midlothian =

This is a list of listed buildings in the parish of Loanhead in Midlothian, Scotland.

== List ==
Name	Location	Date Listed	Grid Ref. (Note: Sometimes known as OSGB36, the grid reference (where provided) is based on the British national grid reference system used by the Ordnance Survey. • "Guide to National Grid". Ordnance Survey. • "Get-a-map". Ordnance Survey.)	Geo-coordinates	Notes	LB Number (Note: Historic Environment Scotland assign a unique alphanumeric identifier to each designated site in Scotland, for listed buildings this always begins with "LB", for example "LB12345".)	Image
Ashgrove House, Demolished Cottage Demolished, Sundial, Boundary Wall And Gate Piers, Loanhead				55°53′08″N 3°09′18″W	Category C(S)	47738	Upload Photo
79 High Street And 81 High Street (Former Mavisbank Jointure House)				55°52′40″N 3°08′37″W	Category B	47740	Upload Photo
Linden Place, Former Mavisbank Gate Lodge				55°52′39″N 3°08′36″W	Category B	47741	Upload Photo
Loanhead, Memorial Park Gateway, Gate, Wall And Monument				55°52′36″N 3°09′14″W	Category C(S)	47742	Upload another image
Fountain Place, Loanhead Former Reformed Presbyterian Church, Including Boundary Walls, Gatepiers, Gates And Railings				55°52′48″N 3°09′07″W	Category B	43893	Upload Photo
Blairesk Hall (Former Bilston Lodge) Including Gatepiers, Boundary Walls, Fountain And Terracing				55°52′24″N 3°08′34″W	Category B	37509	Upload Photo
19 Linden Place, Linden Lodge Including Outbuilding, Perimeter Walls And Gatepiers				55°52′39″N 3°08′32″W	Category B	37510	Upload Photo
Braeside Road, Hillwood, Including Timber Summerhouse (Former Studio) And Glasshouse				55°52′40″N 3°08′22″W	Category B	47739	Upload Photo

== Key ==
The scheme for classifying buildings in Scotland is:

- Category A: "buildings of national or international importance, either architectural or historic; or fine, little-altered examples of some particular period, style or building type."
- Category B: "buildings of regional or more than local importance; or major examples of some particular period, style or building type, which may have been altered."
- Category C: "buildings of local importance; lesser examples of any period, style, or building type, as originally constructed or moderately altered; and simple traditional buildings which group well with other listed buildings."

In March 2016 there were 47,288 listed buildings in Scotland. Of these, 8% were Category A, and 50% were Category B, with the remaining 42% being Category C.

== See also ==
- List of listed buildings in Midlothian
