= Alexander Gordon (antiquary) =

Scottish antiquary (c. 1692 – 1755)

- Born: c. 1692; Aberdeen, Scotland
- Died: 1755
- Education: University of Aberdeen
- Occupation: antiquary
- Known for: Itinerarium Septentrionale

Alexander Gordon (c. 1692 – 1755) was a Scottish antiquary, author and operatic tenor. As an opera singer he is best remembered for creating roles in the premieres of two operas by George Frideric Handel: Tiridate in Radamisto (1720) and Ugone in Flavio (1723). His survey of Roman sites, the Itinerarium Septentrionale, was considered an essential reference by all Roman antiquaries of his time.

== Early life and education ==
Gordon was born at Aberdeen, Scotland in c. 1692. His father, who was still living as late as 1723, was a merchant and sometime dean of the merchant's guild in Aberdeen. He was educated at the University of Aberdeen (UA); becoming proficient in classical and modern languages as well as art and music. He graduated from UA with a Master of Arts diploma.

== Travels in Europe and singing career ==
Gordon began his career in Aberdeen as a teacher of languages and music. He was known among his countrymen as "Singing Sandie." He also painted portraits in oil. In c. 1710 he left Scotland for travels first for Germany and then France before settling in Italy where he spent several years. He most likely worked as a tutor while traveling Europe, and used the opportunity to further his scholarly knowledge of French, Italian, art, and antiquities. He told William Stukeley that when at Capua with Sir George Byng (afterwards Viscount Torrington) "they sav'd the fine amphitheatre there, the 3rd in the world, which the Germans were going to pull down to repair the fortifications, by speaking to the governor & viceroy at Naples."

Gordon was active as an itinerant music teacher while collecting the materials for his Itinerarium in the years before 1720. In Italy he was trained as an opera singer with his first known performance being in Carlo Ignazio Monza's La principessa fedele in Messina in 1716. In the libretto for this opera his name is given as Alessandro Gordon. After this he performed in Giuseppe Maria Orlandini's Lucio Papirio (1717) and Leonardo Leo's Sofonisba (1718) in Naples. In that city he was a resident singer at the Teatro San Bartolomeo. In 1719 he returned to England where he worked as a singer in four concerts given in the winter of that year at Lincoln’s Inn Fields Theatre; beginning with a concert 7 December 1719.

In 1720 Gordon became a member of George Frideric Handel's Royal Academy of Music company (RAM); singing with that organization during its first season. He gave his first performance with the RAM at the King's Theatre, Haymarket on 2 April 1720 in Giovanni Porta's Numitor. On 27 April 1720 he created the role of King Tiridate in the world premiere of Handel's Radamisto. This was followed by a performance as Aristeo in Domenico Scarlatti's Narciso; a production using an arrangement of the opera by Thomas Roseingrave. He did not perform with RAM in 1721 or 1722, but did sing in benefits given at the York Buildings (1721) and Little Haymarket Theatre (1722).

In February 1723 Gordon returned to RAM to perform the role of Azzio Tullo in Attilio Ariosti's Coriolano. This was followed by the role of Ugone in the premiere of Handel's Flavio in May 1723. Handel wrote a part for Gordon in his opera Giulio Cesare (1724), but Gordon turned this down; abandoning his singing career in favor of pursuing research on the Roman antiquities of Scotland and northern England.

== Survey of Roman ruins ==
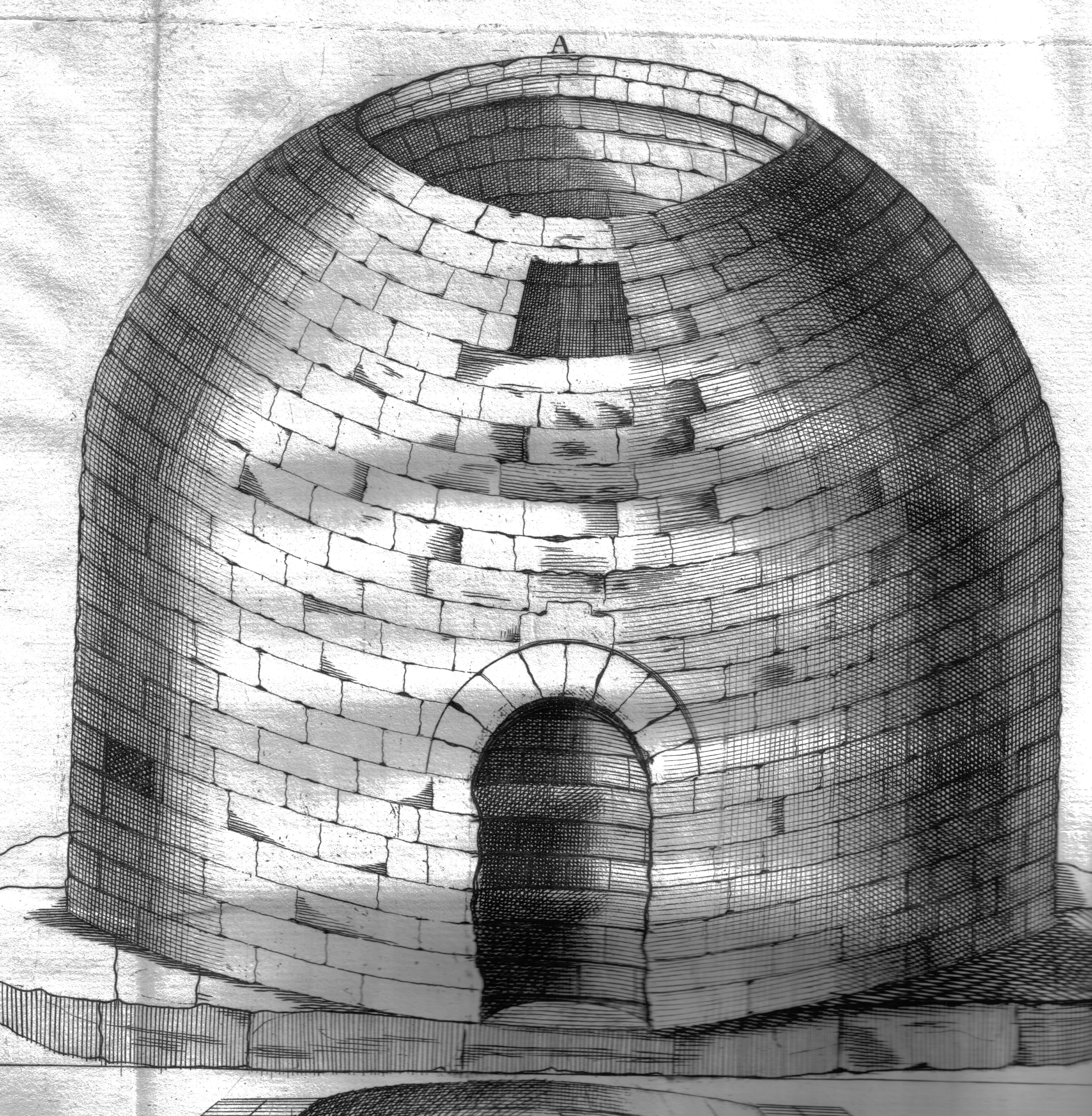
Arthur's O'On at Stenhousemuir from Gordon's book.

In 1720 Stukeley, in his Account of a Roman Temple [Arthur's Oon] and other antiquities near Graham's Dike in Scotland, expressed his wonder that no Scotsman had hitherto investigated the Roman antiquities of the country. "This," says Gordon, "was sufficient excitement for me to proceed still more vigorously in collecting what I had begun." During three successive years he visited different parts of Scotland and Northumberland, exploring, drawing, and measuring ancient remains, at much cost and some hardship. Liberal patrons, however, were not wanting, such as the Duke of Queensberry, to whom the work was subsequently dedicated, the Earl of Pembroke, the Earl of Findlater, the Earl of Hertford, and Viscount Bateman, whose cabinet of curiosities he was often enabled to enrich during his travels at home and abroad, Edward Chandler, then bishop of Lichfield, and Duncan Forbes of Culloden, at that time lord advocate. His great patron was Sir John Clerk of Penicuik, Edinburghshire. Gordon was a frequent guest at Old Penicuik House, where he had access to a splendid museum of antiquities, and was accompanied by Clerk in his Northumbrian explorations, as well as in others nearer home. The work, which had been largely subscribed for, appeared as Itinerarium Septentrionale; or, a Journey thro' most of the Counties of Scotland, and those in the North of England. . . . Part 1. Containing an Account of all the Monuments of Roman Antiquity. . . . Part 2. An Account of the Danish Invasions on Scotland . . . With sixty-six copperplates [and an appendix]. In this laborious work Gordon proved himself an honest, painstaking antiquary.

Though his theories have long since been exploded, he has preserved records of earthworks, inscriptions, and relics of various kinds, of which but for him all knowledge would have been lost. The appendix derived its chief value from a learned correspondence concerning ancient sepulchral rites in Britain between Sir John Clerk and Roger Gale which Gordon here made public, greatly to their annoyance. He apologises for the inelegant illustrations of his Itinerarium. On page 188 of the Itinerarium Gordon announced his intention of issuing in a few days proposals for engraving by subscription A Compleat View of the Roman Walls in Britain. It is much to be regretted that for want of the necessary funds this survey, with drawings of all the inscriptions and altars discovered, should not have appeared.

== Later life in Scotland and England ==
Gordon now attempted to give practical effect to a project for cutting a navigable canal between the Firth of Clyde and the Firth of Forth. The scheme, however, was not new to the government, who considered that the profits would not answer the charge. Gordon's circumstances, always narrow, were not improved by the prosecution of projects which never repaid him. According to John Whiston, the London bookseller, he was for some time in partnership with John Wilcox, a bookseller in the Strand, "but his education, temper, and manners did not suit him for a trade. . . .Poverty tempted him to dishonesty," or perhaps want of business habits may have rendered him careless in regard to money transactions. His next publication was The Lives of Pope Alexander VI and his son Cæsar Borgia; comprehending the Wars in the Reigns of Charles VIII and Lewis XII, Kings of France, and the chief Transactions and Revolutions in Italy from . . . 1492 to ... 1506. With an Appendix of original Pieces referred to in the book. The volume contains portraits of Alexander VI and of Cæsar Borgia, the former probably etched by the author. In 1751 a French version appeared at Amsterdam. A solitary dramatic attempt, Lupone, or the Inquisitor: a comedy, was deemed by the managers to be too classical for representation. He was more successful with a translation of the De Amphitheatro of Francesco Scipione, marchese di Maffei, published as A Compleat History of the Ancient Amphitheatres, more peculiarly regarding the Architecture of these Buildings, and in particular that of Verona. . . . Adorned with Sculptures [25 plates]; also, some Account of this learned Work.

Between 1731 and 1732 Gordon had made some additions to his Itinerarium Septentrionale, of which a Latin edition was being prepared in Holland. This never appeared, but Gordon printed the supplement he had prepared for it in a separate form, entitled Additions and Corrections by way of Supplement to the Itinerarium Septentrionale, containing several dissertations on, and descriptions of, Roman Antiquities discovered in Scotland since the publishing the said Itinerary. Together with Observations on other Ancient Monuments found in the North of England. Never before publish'd. In 1736 Gordon was appointed secretary to the Society for the Encouragement of Learning, with an annual salary of £50. In the same year he succeeded Stukeley as secretary to the Society of Antiquaries, of which he had been elected a fellow on 17 February 1725.

It was probably through Stukeley's influence that he also obtained the secretaryship of the Egyptian Society, of which Stukeley was one of the founders, and thus had a new bent given to his researches. Gordon published two very learned treatises wherein he undertook to solve the mysteries of hieroglyphics and to illustrate "all the Egyptian mummies in England." Their titles are An Essay towards explaining the Hieroglyphical Figures on the Coffin of the Ancient Mummy belonging to Capt. William Lethieullier. (An Essay towards explaining the antient Hieroglyphical Figures on the Egyptian Mummy in the Museum of Doctor Mead). The letterpress is explanatory of three only of the twenty-five plates, and the remainder never appeared. The manuscript, along with the drawings, was apparently in the sale of Sir Charles Frederick's library in July 1786. In the second essay the author mentions another work, as "nearly ready," An Essay towards illustrating the History, Chronology, and Mythology of the Ancient Egyptians, from the earliest ages on record, till the Dissolution of their Empire, near the Times of Alexander. It was not, however, completed until 6 July 1741. By that time Gordon had resigned his secretaryships. He was married, and no doubt found his income insufficient. Whiston says that Gordon having been found deficient in his accounts was dismissed from the Society for the Encouragement of Learning, and his effects seized on.

== Life in South Carolina ==
Gordon sailed for South Carolina in August 1741, as secretary to James Glen, F.S.A., the newly appointed governor of that province. There he eventually prospered. From the recorded copy of a deed still extant at Charleston it appears that one Hamerton, the registrar of the province, farmed out his office to Gordon, and by this deed appointed him his attorney to transact all the business and receive all the fees of the office. There is also among the recorded conveyances one of a large lot of land in Charleston to him, dated 28 March 1746; and in his will he devised to his son and daughter a lot of land in Ansonborough, South Carolina, and all the houses erected thereon. He still kept up a desultory correspondence with Sir John Clerk, to whom he confessed himself "vastly weary" of colonial life. To the Royal Society he sent an elaborate description of the natural history of South Carolina, which was not read until 25 May 1758. Nor was it printed in the Philosophical Transactions.

On 22 August 1754 Gordon, "being sick and weak of body," made his will at Charleston. To his son, Alexander, an attorney of Charleston, he bequeathed his own portrait, painted by himself, together with other of his paintings. He also strictly enjoined him to publish his manuscript Essay towards illustrating the History of ... the Ancient Egyptians. The essay was never printed, and is preserved in the British Museum, having been purchased in March 1831. Gordon's wife is not mentioned in his will. He died before 23 July 1755, when the devisees under his will executed a conveyance of land in South Carolina. His daughter, Frances Charlotte Gordon, appears to have been married, on 30 May 1763 to John Troup, a Charleston attorney. None of his descendants are now known to survive in South Carolina. The traditions of the Penicuick family represent Gordon as a grave man, of formal habits, tall, lean, and usually taciturn. Beaupré Bell made a bust of him after an original given by Gordon to Sir Andrew Fountaine's niece.

The Itinerarium, the essential handbook of all Roman antiquaries of that day, was a favourite with Sir Walter Scott, who has immortalised it in The Antiquary as that prized folio which Jonathan Oldbuck undid from its brown paper wrapper in the Hawes fly or Queensferry diligence.
