= List of listed buildings in Bonnyrigg And Lasswade, Midlothian =

This is a list of listed buildings in the parish of Bonnyrigg And Lasswade in Midlothian, Scotland.

== List ==
Name	Location	Date Listed	Grid Ref. (Note: Sometimes known as OSGB36, the grid reference (where provided) is based on the British national grid reference system used by the Ordnance Survey. • "Guide to National Grid". Ordnance Survey. • "Get-a-map". Ordnance Survey.)	Geo-coordinates	Notes	LB Number (Note: Historic Environment Scotland assign a unique alphanumeric identifier to each designated site in Scotland, for listed buildings this always begins with "LB", for example "LB12345".)	Image
Bonnyrigg, 13 And 15 Dundas Street, Including Boundary Walls				55°52′28″N 3°06′19″W	Category C(S)	44122	Upload Photo
Lasswade, 5 School Green, Droman House, Including Former Stable Block, Gatepiers And Gates				55°53′00″N 3°07′02″W	Category B	44141	Upload Photo
Bonnyrigg, Viewbank View, Viewbank House, Summerhouse				55°52′55″N 3°05′59″W	Category B	22407	Upload Photo
Bonnyrigg, 3 Broomieknowe, Dunraven, Including Gatepiers, Boundary Walls And Outbuilding				55°52′51″N 3°06′46″W	Category C(S)	44114	Upload Photo
Bonnyrigg, 19 Broomieknowe, Vaila				55°52′45″N 3°06′50″W	Category B	44116	Upload Photo
Bonnyrigg, Broomieknowe, The Elms Including Outbuilding, Gatepiers And Boundary Walls				55°52′49″N 3°06′40″W	Category B	44118	Upload Photo
Bonnyrigg, High Street, Bonnyrigg Parish Church				55°52′37″N 3°06′27″W	Category B	44127	Upload another image
Bonnyrigg, Lothian Street, Parish Council Offices, Orchard Centre				55°52′32″N 3°06′17″W	Category B	44133	Upload Photo
Bonnyrigg, 33 Broomieknowe, The Hill, Garden Pavilion And Summerhouse				55°52′43″N 3°06′53″W	Category C(S)	44117	Upload Photo
Bonnyrigg, 17 And 19 Dundas Street, Including Boundary Walls				55°52′27″N 3°06′18″W	Category C(S)	44123	Upload Photo
Bonnyrigg, 11 Elm Row				55°53′00″N 3°06′46″W	Category C(S)	44125	Upload Photo
Lasswade, School Brae, Lasswade Parish Church Eskside Hall, Including Boundary Wall, Gatepiers And Railings				55°52′58″N 3°06′57″W	Category C(S)	44140	Upload Photo
Bonnyrigg, 7 Broomieknowe, Strathmore, Including Boundary Wall And Gatepiers				55°52′50″N 3°06′47″W	Category C(S)	44115	Upload Photo
Bonnyrigg, Dobbies Road, St Leonard Episcopal Church Including Church Hall				55°52′37″N 3°06′59″W	Category B	44121	Upload Photo
Bonnyrigg, Sherwood Crescent, Cockpen Nursery School Including Boundary Walls And Outbuilding				55°52′10″N 3°05′42″W	Category B	44138	Upload Photo
Bonnyrigg, Polton Road, Strathesk Church Of Scotland (Lasswade Parish Church) Including Boundary Walls And Railings				55°52′57″N 3°06′48″W	Category B	22405	Upload another image
Bonnyrigg, 10 Hillhead, Olrig, Including Boundary Walls And Gatepiers				55°52′47″N 3°06′35″W	Category B	44131	Upload Photo
Bonnyrigg, Eldindean Road, Whitehill Villa, Including Gatepiers And Boundary Walls				55°52′46″N 3°06′26″W	Category B	44124	Upload Photo
Bonnyrigg, 4 Elm Row, Formerly District Council Offices, Including Boundary Walls, Railings And Gates				55°53′01″N 3°06′47″W	Category B	44126	Upload Photo
Bonnyrigg, Hillhead, Nazareth House				55°52′58″N 3°06′35″W	Category C(S)	44128	Upload Photo
Bonnyrigg, Lothian Street, Public Library, Orchard Centre				55°52′31″N 3°06′18″W	Category B	44134	Upload Photo
Bonnyrigg, Hillhead, Nazareth House, Lodge Including Quadrant Walls And Gatepiers				55°52′56″N 3°06′41″W	Category C(S)	44129	Upload Photo
Bonnyrigg, 7 Hillhead, Viewpark Including Boundary Walls And Gatepiers				55°52′50″N 3°06′32″W	Category C(S)	44130	Upload Photo
Lasswade, High Street, Brigdgend House				55°53′00″N 3°06′55″W	Category C(S)	44139	Upload Photo
Lasswade, High Street, Lasswade Bridge, River North Esk				55°52′59″N 3°06′52″W	Category B	22406	Upload Photo
Bonnyrigg, 12 Broomieknowe, Gordon Bank, Including Boundary Walls, Railings And Gates				55°52′46″N 3°06′44″W	Category C(S)	44119	Upload Photo
Bonnyrigg, 34 Broomieknowe, Hay Cottage, Including Boundary Walls				55°53′13″N 3°06′56″W	Category C(S)	44120	Upload Photo
Bonnyrigg, 16 Hillhead, Oakmount Including Boundary Wall And Gatepiers				55°52′53″N 3°06′45″W	Category B	44132	Upload Photo
Bonnyrigg, 45 Polton Road, Including Boundary Wall And Gatepiers				55°52′44″N 3°06′57″W	Category B	44135	Upload Photo
Bonnyrigg, Polton Road, Springbank Lodge Including Gateway And Boundary Walls				55°52′51″N 3°06′52″W	Category C(S)	44136	Upload Photo
Bonnyrigg, Polton Street, Midlothian Teachers' Centre, Formerly Bonnyrigg Infant School				55°52′21″N 3°06′30″W	Category C(S)	44137	Upload Photo

== Key ==
The scheme for classifying buildings in Scotland is:

- Category A: "buildings of national or international importance, either architectural or historic; or fine, little-altered examples of some particular period, style or building type."
- Category B: "buildings of regional or more than local importance; or major examples of some particular period, style or building type, which may have been altered."
- Category C: "buildings of local importance; lesser examples of any period, style, or building type, as originally constructed or moderately altered; and simple traditional buildings which group well with other listed buildings."

In March 2016 there were 47,288 listed buildings in Scotland. Of these, 8% were Category A, and 50% were Category B, with the remaining 42% being Category C.

== See also ==
- List of listed buildings in Midlothian
