= List of listed buildings in Cranston, Midlothian =

This is a list of listed buildings in the parish of Cranston in Midlothian, Scotland.

== List ==
Name	Location	Date Listed	Grid Ref. (Note: Sometimes known as OSGB36, the grid reference (where provided) is based on the British national grid reference system used by the Ordnance Survey. • "Guide to National Grid". Ordnance Survey. • "Get-a-map". Ordnance Survey.)	Geo-coordinates	Notes	LB Number (Note: Historic Environment Scotland assign a unique alphanumeric identifier to each designated site in Scotland, for listed buildings this always begins with "LB", for example "LB12345".)	Image
Preston Hall Policies, Walled Garden Including Sheds, Gazebos, Glass Houses, Sundial And Gardener's House				55°52′58″N 2°58′22″W	Category A	777	Upload Photo
Preston Hall Policies, Icehouse				55°52′56″N 2°58′32″W	Category C(S)	778	Upload Photo
Chesterhill, The Old Windmill				55°52′30″N 3°00′20″W	Category B	751	Upload Photo
Cranstoun Riddel, Former Coach-Houses And Stable Including Boundary Walls And Gatepiers				55°52′48″N 2°59′06″W	Category C(S)	767	Upload Photo
Cousland Park, Including Former Orchard To Sw				55°54′33″N 2°58′28″W	Category B	774	Upload Photo
Cousland, Smiddy And Cottage				55°54′20″N 2°59′45″W	Category B	776	Upload Photo
Preston Hall Policies, Stables Including Kennels, Piggery, Pheasantry And Cottages				55°52′58″N 2°58′00″W	Category A	113	Upload Photo
Pathhead, Stair Arms Hotel				55°52′22″N 2°58′48″W	Category B	49106	Upload Photo
Preston Hall Policies, Keeper's Lodge, Boundary Walls, Gatepiers And Gates				55°52′58″N 2°57′35″W	Category C(S)	49108	Upload another image
Redrow Cottages				55°52′56″N 2°57′32″W	Category C(S)	49109	Upload Photo
Airfield Farm, Including Farmhouse And Steading				55°53′56″N 2°58′45″W	Category C(S)	51734	Upload Photo
Preston Hall Policies, North Gate				55°53′38″N 2°57′24″W	Category A	745	Upload Photo
Preston Hall Policies, The Lions Gate				55°52′34″N 2°58′21″W	Category A	746	Upload another image See more images
Tyne Bridge				55°52′29″N 2°58′23″W	Category B	747	Upload Photo
Oxenfoord Policies, Icehouse				55°52′33″N 2°58′26″W	Category C(S)	770	Upload Photo
Edgehead Farmhouse				55°52′36″N 3°00′18″W	Category C(S)	49101	Upload Photo
Oxenfoord Policies, Middle Lodge				55°52′40″N 2°59′09″W	Category C(S)	6637	Upload Photo
Cranstoun House (Former Manse), Including Service Buildings And Walled Garden				55°52′16″N 2°59′22″W	Category B	6567	Upload Photo
Preston Dene House And Former Office Block				55°52′43″N 2°57′13″W	Category B	748	Upload Photo
Cranstoun Riddel, Cranstoun Parish Church, Including Churchyard, Boundary Walls, Gatepiers And Gates				55°52′45″N 2°59′08″W	Category B	766	Upload Photo
Oxenfoord Policies, North Lodge And Boundary Wall				55°53′03″N 2°59′25″W	Category B	771	Upload Photo
Edgehead Lodge, Including Boundary Wall And Gatepiers				55°52′38″N 3°00′25″W	Category C(S)	49102	Upload Photo
Oxenfoord Policies, Walled Garden And Gardener's House				55°52′45″N 2°58′55″W	Category C(S)	49105	Upload Photo
Oxenfoord Mains House And Boundary Walls				55°53′35″N 2°58′06″W	Category B	772	Upload Photo
Oxenfoord Mains, Steading				55°53′36″N 2°58′08″W	Category C(S)	773	Upload Photo
Chesterhill, Sauchenside Farmhouse And Steading				55°52′21″N 2°59′44″W	Category C(S)	750	Upload Photo
Tyne Water, Oxenfoord Bridge				55°53′44″N 2°57′47″W	Category B	752	Upload Photo
Cranstoun Riddel, Former Factor's House				55°52′48″N 2°59′13″W	Category B	49100	Upload Photo
Oxenfoord Policies, Cranstoun Dean Bridge				55°52′33″N 2°58′35″W	Category B	49103	Upload Photo
Oxenfoord Policies, South Lodge Including Boundary Walls, Gates And Gatepiers				55°52′18″N 2°58′40″W	Category B	6638	Upload Photo
Cranston, Junction Of A68 And A6093, War Memorial				55°53′03″N 2°59′27″W	Category C(S)	49099	Upload Photo
Oxenfoord Policies, Former Cranstoun Churchyard Including Boundary Wall, Gatepiers, Urns, Gates And Monuments				55°52′47″N 2°58′51″W	Category B	49104	Upload Photo
Preston Hall Policies, The Temple				55°53′14″N 2°58′07″W	Category A	779	Upload Photo
Oxenfoord Castle				55°52′44″N 2°58′46″W	Category A	768	Upload Photo
Oxenfoord Viaduct				55°52′46″N 2°58′46″W	Category A	769	Upload another image See more images
Preston Hall				55°52′52″N 2°58′11″W	Category A	775	Upload Photo
Preston Cottage, Coach House, Boundary Walls And Gatepiers				55°52′37″N 2°57′45″W	Category C(S)	49107	Upload Photo
Ford Village, Woodlands (Formerly Old U.P. Manse), Including Boundary Walls, Gatepiers And Gates				55°52′11″N 2°58′57″W	Category C(S)	749	Upload Photo

== Key ==
The scheme for classifying buildings in Scotland is:

- Category A: "buildings of national or international importance, either architectural or historic; or fine, little-altered examples of some particular period, style or building type."
- Category B: "buildings of regional or more than local importance; or major examples of some particular period, style or building type, which may have been altered."
- Category C: "buildings of local importance; lesser examples of any period, style, or building type, as originally constructed or moderately altered; and simple traditional buildings which group well with other listed buildings."

In March 2016 there were 47,288 listed buildings in Scotland. Of these, 8% were Category A, and 50% were Category B, with the remaining 42% being Category C.

== See also ==
- List of listed buildings in Midlothian
