= List of listed buildings in Glencorse, Midlothian =

This is a list of listed buildings in the parish of Glencorse in Midlothian, Scotland.

== List ==
Name	Location	Date Listed	Grid Ref. (Note: Sometimes known as OSGB36, the grid reference (where provided) is based on the British national grid reference system used by the Ordnance Survey. • "Guide to National Grid". Ordnance Survey. • "Get-a-map". Ordnance Survey.)	Geo-coordinates	Notes	LB Number (Note: Historic Environment Scotland assign a unique alphanumeric identifier to each designated site in Scotland, for listed buildings this always begins with "LB", for example "LB12345".)	Image
Woodhoouselee Policies, Burial Ground, Fraser Tytler Memorial				55°51′58″N 3°13′26″W	Category C(S)	13510	Upload Photo
The Bush Policies, Gatepiers And Screen Walls				55°51′43″N 3°12′15″W	Category C(S)	7463	Upload Photo
Loganbank House, Loganbank And Loganlea (All Formerly Loganbank House)				55°51′13″N 3°12′15″W	Category B	7466	Upload Photo
Woodhouselee Policies, Former Stables				55°52′05″N 3°13′04″W	Category B	13512	Upload Photo
Glencorse, Old Glencorse Kirk				55°51′17″N 3°12′26″W	Category A	7454	Upload another image See more images
Belwood House, Including North Wing And South Wing				55°50′51″N 3°13′32″W	Category B	7460	Upload Photo
The Bush House Including Stables, Laundry House, Boundary Walls, Gatepiers And Gates				55°51′33″N 3°12′25″W	Category A	7462	Upload another image See more images
The Bush Policies, Former Gardener's House				55°51′37″N 3°12′29″W	Category B	47744	Upload Photo
Old Glencorse Kirk, Watch House Kirkyard And Boundary Walls				55°51′17″N 3°12′28″W	Category C(S)	47754	Upload Photo
Glencorse Parish Church				55°51′03″N 3°12′17″W	Category A	7456	Upload another image See more images
Gillieknowe (Former Glencorse House Stables) Including Gatepiers, Gates, Quadrant Walls And Walled Garden				55°51′21″N 3°12′40″W	Category C(S)	7457	Upload Photo
Glencorse Barracks, The Keep (Former Quartermaster's Store And Armoury)				55°50′42″N 3°12′09″W	Category B	7458	Upload Photo
Aaron House Nursing And Residential Care Home (Former Beeslack House)				55°50′23″N 3°12′25″W	Category B	7459	Upload Photo
Glencorse Barracks, Clock Tower				55°50′43″N 3°12′12″W	Category A	44614	Upload Photo
Old Woodhouselee Tunnel				55°50′31″N 3°11′24″W	Category C(S)	7465	Upload Photo
Beeslack House, Lodge				55°50′27″N 3°12′45″W	Category C(S)	47743	Upload Photo
Glencorse Parish Church, War Memorial				55°51′04″N 3°12′17″W	Category C(S)	47753	Upload another image
Glencorse House, South Lodge, Boundary Walls, Gatepiers And Gates				55°51′16″N 3°12′29″W	Category B	7455	Upload Photo
Old Woodhouselee Railway Viaduct Over River North Esk				55°50′31″N 3°11′10″W	Category B	7464	Upload Photo
Glencorse Barracks, Chapel, Terrace And Stores				55°50′43″N 3°12′10″W	Category B	44616	Upload Photo
Glencorse Barracks, Barrack Block				55°50′43″N 3°12′08″W	Category B	44615	Upload Photo
Penicuick, Bellwood Road, Martyr's Cross House				55°50′55″N 3°13′53″W	Category B	7461	Upload Photo
Glencorse Barracks, Memorial Lodges, Gates, Gatepiers And Boundary Walls				55°50′44″N 3°12′15″W	Category B	44617	Upload another image
Rullion Green, The Martyr's Tomb				55°50′52″N 3°14′37″W	Category B	13650	Upload another image
Hillend Farmhouse And Steading				55°53′11″N 3°11′53″W	Category B	13511	Upload Photo
Woodhouselee Policies, Archway				55°52′01″N 3°13′14″W	Category B	13513	Upload Photo

== Key ==
The scheme for classifying buildings in Scotland is:

- Category A: "buildings of national or international importance, either architectural or historic; or fine, little-altered examples of some particular period, style or building type."
- Category B: "buildings of regional or more than local importance; or major examples of some particular period, style or building type, which may have been altered."
- Category C: "buildings of local importance; lesser examples of any period, style, or building type, as originally constructed or moderately altered; and simple traditional buildings which group well with other listed buildings."

In March 2016 there were 47,288 listed buildings in Scotland. Of these, 8% were Category A, and 50% were Category B, with the remaining 42% being Category C.

== See also ==
- List of listed buildings in Midlothian
