= List of listed buildings in Fala And Soutra, Midlothian =

This is a list of listed buildings in the parish of Fala and Soutra in Midlothian, Scotland.

== List ==
Name	Location	Date Listed	Grid Ref. (Note: Sometimes known as OSGB36, the grid reference (where provided) is based on the British national grid reference system used by the Ordnance Survey. • "Guide to National Grid". Ordnance Survey. • "Get-a-map". Ordnance Survey.)	Geo-coordinates	Notes	LB Number (Note: Historic Environment Scotland assign a unique alphanumeric identifier to each designated site in Scotland, for listed buildings this always begins with "LB", for example "LB12345".)	Image
Fala Luggie				55°49′15″N 2°55′13″W	Category C(S)	7442	Upload Photo
Deanburn House				55°49′38″N 2°52′50″W	Category C(S)	7443	Upload Photo
Blackshiels Inn (Now Farm-House				55°50′17″N 2°54′03″W	Category B	7441	Upload another image
Fala Manse, Fala				55°50′19″N 2°53′50″W	Category B	7439	Upload another image
Cottage No 31, Fala				55°50′18″N 2°53′57″W	Category B	7440	Upload another image

== Key ==
The scheme for classifying buildings in Scotland is:

- Category A: "buildings of national or international importance, either architectural or historic; or fine, little-altered examples of some particular period, style or building type."
- Category B: "buildings of regional or more than local importance; or major examples of some particular period, style or building type, which may have been altered."
- Category C: "buildings of local importance; lesser examples of any period, style, or building type, as originally constructed or moderately altered; and simple traditional buildings which group well with other listed buildings."

In March 2016 there were 47,288 listed buildings in Scotland. Of these, 8% were Category A, and 50% were Category B, with the remaining 42% being Category C.

== See also ==
- List of listed buildings in Midlothian
