= List of listed buildings in Crichton, Midlothian =

This is a list of listed buildings in the parish of Crichton in Midlothian, Scotland.

== List ==
Name	Location	Date Listed	Grid Ref. (Note: Sometimes known as OSGB36, the grid reference (where provided) is based on the British national grid reference system used by the Ordnance Survey. • "Guide to National Grid". Ordnance Survey. • "Get-a-map". Ordnance Survey.)	Geo-coordinates	Notes	LB Number (Note: Historic Environment Scotland assign a unique alphanumeric identifier to each designated site in Scotland, for listed buildings this always begins with "LB", for example "LB12345".)	Image
Crichton Castle, Stables				55°50′20″N 2°59′29″W	Category A	755	Upload another image See more images
Ford, Ford House And Walled Garden				55°52′07″N 2°58′39″W	Category A	756	Upload another image See more images
Crichton House, East And West Wings				55°51′06″N 2°57′34″W	Category A	757	Upload another image
Crichton, Crichton Mains				55°50′50″N 2°58′46″W	Category B	47759	Upload another image
Pathhead, 7 Main Street				55°52′08″N 2°58′17″W	Category C(S)	47763	Upload Photo
Pathhead, 23 Main Street, Boundary Wall And Wrought-Iron Railings				55°52′07″N 2°58′13″W	Category C(S)	47764	Upload Photo
Saughland Farm Cottages And Boundary Walls				55°50′23″N 2°56′00″W	Category C(S)	47771	Upload Photo
Tynebank And Cottages				55°51′18″N 2°58′54″W	Category B	47772	Upload Photo
Crichton Castle				55°50′22″N 2°59′30″W	Category A	754	Upload another image
Costerton, Former Costerton House, Doocot				55°51′35″N 2°54′04″W	Category C(S)	758	Upload Photo
Crichton Village, Cottages 10-14 (Inclusive Numbers)				55°50′49″N 2°58′59″W	Category B	765	Upload Photo
Pathhead, 75-77 (Odd Numbers) Main Street				55°52′03″N 2°58′02″W	Category C(S)	47767	Upload Photo
Cakemuir Castle, Including Walled Garden, Stable Range And Cottage				55°49′17″N 2°56′20″W	Category B	764	Upload Photo
Tynehead, Station Cottage				55°49′19″N 2°58′09″W	Category C(S)	47773	Upload Photo
12 Fala Dam, White House				55°50′38″N 2°54′49″W	Category C(S)	760	Upload Photo
8 Fala Dam, The Dam House				55°50′38″N 2°54′50″W	Category C(S)	112	Upload Photo
Crichton Manse Including Garden Buildings, Railings And Garden Walls				55°50′39″N 2°59′28″W	Category B	6681	Upload Photo
Pathhead, 71-73 (Odd Numbers) Main Street				55°52′03″N 2°58′02″W	Category C(S)	5092	Upload Photo
10 Fala Dam, Laggan Cottage				55°50′38″N 2°54′50″W	Category C(S)	759	Upload Photo
Longfaugh Farm House				55°50′47″N 2°56′47″W	Category C(S)	763	Upload Photo
Costerton, Former Costerton House Icehouse				55°51′35″N 2°54′09″W	Category B	47757	Upload Photo
Pathhead, 39 Main Street				55°52′06″N 2°58′08″W	Category C(S)	47765	Upload Photo
Pathhead, 57 Main Street, Grey's House				55°52′05″N 2°58′05″W	Category C(S)	47766	Upload Photo
Pathhead, 119 Main Street				55°51′58″N 2°57′56″W	Category C(S)	47768	Upload Photo
Pathhead, 172 Main Street				55°51′53″N 2°57′52″W	Category C(S)	47770	Upload Photo
Costerton, Costerton House (Former Gardener's Cottage) And Walled Garden				55°51′31″N 2°54′15″W	Category C(S)	47756	Upload Photo
Pathhead, 159 Main Street				55°51′55″N 2°57′51″W	Category C(S)	47769	Upload Photo
Lothian Bridge, Tyne Valley				55°52′12″N 2°58′29″W	Category A	5090	Upload another image See more images
Crichton Kirk (Formerly Collegiate Church Of S.S. Mary And Kentigern) Including Graveyard				55°50′37″N 2°59′25″W	Category A	753	Upload another image
14 Fala Dam, Falaburn House				55°50′38″N 2°54′47″W	Category C(S)	761	Upload Photo
Pathhead, 47 Main Street				55°52′05″N 2°58′07″W	Category C(S)	5091	Upload Photo
Bridge, Fala Dam Burn				55°50′39″N 2°54′46″W	Category C(S)	762	Upload Photo
Crichton Limekilns, Pathhead				55°50′37″N 2°58′15″W	Category C(S)	47758	Upload Photo

== Key ==
The scheme for classifying buildings in Scotland is:

- Category A: "buildings of national or international importance, either architectural or historic; or fine, little-altered examples of some particular period, style or building type."
- Category B: "buildings of regional or more than local importance; or major examples of some particular period, style or building type, which may have been altered."
- Category C: "buildings of local importance; lesser examples of any period, style, or building type, as originally constructed or moderately altered; and simple traditional buildings which group well with other listed buildings."

In March 2016 there were 47,288 listed buildings in Scotland. Of these, 8% were Category A, and 50% were Category B, with the remaining 42% being Category C.

== See also ==
- List of listed buildings in Midlothian
