= List of listed buildings in Newton, Midlothian =

This is a list of listed buildings in the civil parish of Newton in Midlothian, Scotland.

== List ==
Name	Location	Date Listed	Grid Ref. (Note: Sometimes known as OSGB36, the grid reference (where provided) is based on the British national grid reference system used by the Ordnance Survey. • "Guide to National Grid". Ordnance Survey. • "Get-a-map". Ordnance Survey.)	Geo-coordinates	Notes	LB Number (Note: Historic Environment Scotland assign a unique alphanumeric identifier to each designated site in Scotland, for listed buildings this always begins with "LB", for example "LB12345".)	Image
Millerhill, Newton Farmhouse				55°55′00″N 3°04′11″W	Category B	14181	Upload Photo
Sheriffhall Farmhouse Including Steading And Walled Garden				55°53′59″N 3°05′21″W	Category B	14183	Upload Photo
Old Dalkeith Road, Drum House, East Lodges With Quadrant Walls, Gatepiers And Gates				55°54′41″N 3°06′42″W	Category B	14185	Upload Photo
Millerhill, Newton House Including Walls And Gatepiers				55°54′58″N 3°04′09″W	Category B	14179	Upload Photo
Millerhill, Newton Farm Steading And Gatepiers				55°55′01″N 3°04′10″W	Category C(S)	47733	Upload Photo
Old Dalkeith Road, Campend Steading				55°54′14″N 3°05′49″W	Category C(S)	47736	Upload Photo
Old Newton Kirk Tower				55°54′35″N 3°04′00″W	Category B	14182	Upload another image
Danderhall Miners' Club, Woolmet House Gateway And Boundary Wall				55°55′02″N 3°06′36″W	Category A	14184	Upload another image
Newton Parish Church, Newton Church Road, Newton Village				55°54′44″N 3°05′50″W	Category B	14201	Upload Photo
Chalfont, Formerly Newton Manse				55°54′53″N 3°05′13″W	Category B	14178	Upload Photo
Newton Parish Church, Watch House, Boundary Walls And Gatepiers				55°54′43″N 3°05′51″W	Category C(S)	47734	Upload Photo
Sheriffhall Dovecot				55°53′59″N 3°05′18″W	Category B	19674	Upload Photo
Millerhill, Newton House, Newton Dovecot				55°54′58″N 3°05′06″W	Category B	14180	Upload Photo
606 Old Dalkeith Road, The Old Smithy				55°54′47″N 3°06′55″W	Category C(S)	43264	Upload Photo
Old Dalkeith Road, Campend House, Boundary Walls, Gatepiers And Gates				55°54′14″N 3°05′49″W	Category C(S)	47735	Upload Photo

== Key ==
The scheme for classifying buildings in Scotland is:

- Category A: "buildings of national or international importance, either architectural or historic; or fine, little-altered examples of some particular period, style or building type."
- Category B: "buildings of regional or more than local importance; or major examples of some particular period, style or building type, which may have been altered."
- Category C: "buildings of local importance; lesser examples of any period, style, or building type, as originally constructed or moderately altered; and simple traditional buildings which group well with other listed buildings."

In March 2016 there were 47,288 listed buildings in Scotland. Of these, 8% were Category A, and 50% were Category B, with the remaining 42% being Category C.

== See also ==
- List of listed buildings in Midlothian
