= List of listed buildings in Lasswade, Midlothian =

This is a list of listed buildings in the parish of Lasswade in Midlothian, Scotland.

== List ==
Name	Location	Date listed	Grid ref. (Note: Sometimes known as OSGB36, the grid reference (where provided) is based on the British national grid reference system used by the Ordnance Survey. • "Guide to National Grid". Ordnance Survey. • "Get-a-map". Ordnance Survey.)	Geo-coordinates	Notes	LB number (Note: Historic Environment Scotland assign a unique alphanumeric identifier to each designated site in Scotland, for listed buildings this always begins with "LB", for example "LB12345".)	Image
Lasswade, Dunesk House, Lodge, Gatepiers, Gates And Boundary Walls				55°52′53″N 3°07′22″W	Category C(S)	44154	Upload Photo
Lasswade, Dunesk House, Walled Garden				55°52′54″N 3°07′18″W	Category C(S)	44155	Upload Photo
Midfield Lodge, Polton, Including Gatepiers, Boundary Wall And Railings				55°51′50″N 3°08′04″W	Category C(S)	44167	Upload Photo
Rosewell, 1 Carnethie Street, (Formerly The Manse) Including Boundary Walls				55°51′24″N 3°07′50″W	Category C(S)	44169	Upload Photo
Rosewell, 295 Carnethie Street, Rosedale House				55°50′38″N 3°08′28″W	Category C(S)	44171	Upload Photo
Rosewell, Carnethie Street, St Matthew Rc Church Including Presbytery, Boundary Walls, Gateway And Cloisters				55°51′19″N 3°08′06″W	Category B	13024	Upload another image
Rosslyn Castle, Including Bridge				55°51′09″N 3°09′36″W	Category A	13026	Upload another image
Rosslyn, Collegehill House, Formerly The Old Inn, Including Boundary Walls And Gateway				55°51′20″N 3°09′38″W	Category B	13029	Upload Photo
Melville Castle, East Lodge Including Gatepiers And Quadrant Walls				55°53′40″N 3°05′31″W	Category B	12934	Upload Photo
Melville Castle, Garden Cottage				55°53′31″N 3°06′48″W	Category C(S)	12935	Upload Photo
Elginhaugh Farmhouse And Cottages				55°53′31″N 3°05′26″W	Category B	12941	Upload Photo
Lasswade, Wadingburn Road, Barony House (Formerly Lasswade Cottage)				55°52′52″N 3°07′31″W	Category A	7398	Upload Photo
Lasswade, Melville Dykes Road, Pittendreich House, South Lodge, Including Boundary Walls				55°53′05″N 3°06′20″W	Category B	44160	Upload another image
Lasswade, Wadingburn Lane, Carlethan House				55°52′57″N 3°07′39″W	Category C(S)	44161	Upload Photo
Rosewell, Carnethie Street, St Joseph's Hospital Lodge, Gatepiers And Railings				55°51′21″N 3°07′55″W	Category B	44170	Upload Photo
Roslin, Main Street, The Original Rosslyn Hotel				55°51′25″N 3°09′50″W	Category C(S)	44175	Upload another image
Hawthornden Castle, Lodge				55°51′38″N 3°08′10″W	Category C(S)	44142	Upload Photo
Rosewell, Carnethie Street, Rosewell Institute, Including Boundary Wall, Railings And Gates				55°50′59″N 3°08′14″W	Category B	43642	Upload Photo
Hawthornden Castle, Including Gatepiers, Boundary Walls, Wellhead Drinking Fountainhead And Outbuilding				55°51′39″N 3°08′29″W	Category A	13023	Upload Photo
Roslin, Rosebank Cottage (Formerly Stables) And Boundary Wall				55°51′24″N 3°09′21″W	Category B	13027	Upload Photo
Auchindinny, Firth House				55°50′25″N 3°11′19″W	Category B	13033	Upload Photo
Melville Castle, Esk Cottage With Sawmill And Cottage				55°53′21″N 3°06′34″W	Category B	12937	Upload Photo
Meville Castle, Walled Garden Steading				55°53′28″N 3°06′33″W	Category C(S)	12938	Upload Photo
Lasswade, Melville Dykes Road, Pittendreich House, Doocot				55°53′05″N 3°06′28″W	Category B	7392	Upload Photo
Melville Castle, Chestnut House, (Formerly Coach House And Stables)				55°53′25″N 3°06′22″W	Category B	7397	Upload Photo
Lasswade, 11 Kevock Road, Mount Esk, Including Former Stables Gatepiers, Gates And Boundary Walls				55°52′43″N 3°07′32″W	Category B	7403	Upload Photo
Mavisbank House, (Formerly New Saughtonhall), Including Service Wing, Terraces, Retaining Walls, And Steps				55°52′27″N 3°08′22″W	Category A	7404	Upload another image
Lasswade Cemetery; Lodges, Gatepiers, Gates And Boundary Walls				55°52′58″N 3°07′06″W	Category B	44144	Upload another image
Mavisbank House, Game Larder				55°52′25″N 3°08′21″W	Category B	44164	Upload Photo
Mavisbank House, Walled Gardens, Including Gates And Gatepiers				55°52′25″N 3°08′14″W	Category A	44166	Upload Photo
Polton Road, Montrose Farm Steading (Now Stables) And Cottages				55°51′54″N 3°08′02″W	Category C(S)	13021	Upload Photo
Bilston Railway Viaduct Over Bilston Burn				55°52′17″N 3°09′04″W	Category A	13035	Upload another image
Mavisbank House, Gazebo				55°52′20″N 3°08′18″W	Category A	7387	Upload Photo
6 Polton Bank, De Quincey Cottage, Including Gates, Gatepiers, Boundary Walls, Railings, And Garden Walls				55°52′16″N 3°08′05″W	Category B	7388	Upload Photo
Lasswade, Esk Tower, Including Gatepiers, Gates And Boundary Walls				55°52′50″N 3°07′18″W	Category B	7401	Upload Photo
Lasswade, 20 Kevock Road, Little Crawfurd, Including Former Cart Shed, Stables And Boundary Walls				55°52′41″N 3°07′32″W	Category C(S)	44158	Upload Photo
Polton Bank, Priorwood House, Formerly Mavisbush House, Including Gates, Gatepiers And Boundary Walls				55°52′15″N 3°08′10″W	Category B	44168	Upload Photo
Rosewell, 150 Carnethie Street, Rosewell Mains With Ancillary Structures				55°51′02″N 3°08′17″W	Category B	44173	Upload Photo
Roslin, 29 Manse Road				55°51′31″N 3°09′45″W	Category B	44176	Upload Photo
Roslin, Penicuik Road, Roslin Glen Hotel				55°51′25″N 3°09′51″W	Category C(S)	44177	Upload Photo
Rosslyn Cemetery, Including Gates, Gatepiers And Boundary Walls				55°51′19″N 3°09′43″W	Category C(S)	44178	Upload another image See more images
Rosslyn, Custodian's Office (Stables To Old Inn), Including Boundary Walls And Adjoining Gateway To Rosslyn Chapel				55°49′53″N 3°09′33″W	Category B	13030	Upload Photo
Melville Castle, Willie's Temple				55°53′23″N 3°06′44″W	Category A	12940	Upload Photo
Lasswade Old Kirkyard, Including Boundary Walls, Burial Aisles And Enclosures				55°52′59″N 3°07′04″W	Category B	7390	Upload another image
Melville Castle				55°53′28″N 3°06′16″W	Category A	7394	Upload another image
Lasswade, Kevock Road, Kevock Tower, Summerhouse				55°52′44″N 3°07′22″W	Category C(S)	44159	Upload Photo
Mavisbank House, Dairy (Comprising South Lodge, The Coach House And The Barn), Including Gatepiers, Gates And Walled Yard				55°52′19″N 3°08′19″W	Category C(S)	44163	Upload Photo
Rosewell, Carnethie Street, Rosewell Parish Church, Including Gatepiers And Gates				55°51′00″N 3°08′17″W	Category B	44172	Upload another image
Roslin, Eskhill House, Including Gatepiers, Terrace And Boundary Walls And Outbuilding				55°51′00″N 3°10′37″W	Category B	13846	Upload Photo
Pentland Burial Ground, Including Watch House, Vault And Boundary Walls				55°53′04″N 3°10′51″W	Category B	13036	Upload another image See more images
Melville Castle, South Lodge, Including Gatepiers And Quadrant Walls				55°53′13″N 3°06′08″W	Category C(S)	12933	Upload Photo
Melville Castle, Garden Farmhouse With Gatepiers				55°53′31″N 3°06′46″W	Category C(S)	12936	Upload Photo
Elginhaugh Bridge, River North Esk				55°53′32″N 3°05′12″W	Category B	7393	Upload Photo
Baird Smith Memorial				55°53′00″N 3°07′02″W	Category C(S)	50605	Upload Photo
Hardengreen House				55°52′47″N 3°04′54″W	Category C(S)	45599	Upload Photo
Lasswade, 16 Kevock Road, Including Boundary Wall				55°52′44″N 3°07′38″W	Category B	44157	Upload Photo
Gorton Road, Old Gorton House				55°51′21″N 3°08′57″W	Category C(S)	13025	Upload Photo
Melville Mains, South Range Of Steading				55°53′27″N 3°07′05″W	Category B	12939	Upload Photo
Lasswade, Melville Dykes Road, Pittendreich House, Including Gatepiers And Boundary Walls				55°53′04″N 3°06′31″W	Category B	7391	Upload Photo
Lasswade, Wadingburn Road Barony House, Cottage And Gateway				55°52′53″N 3°07′33″W	Category B	7399	Upload Photo
Lasswade, Dunesk House				55°52′55″N 3°07′14″W	Category B	7400	Upload Photo
Mavisbank House, Ice House				55°52′29″N 3°08′22″W	Category B	44165	Upload Photo
Rosewell, Castle View, Including Gatepiers And Boundary Walls				55°51′12″N 3°09′09″W	Category B	44174	Upload Photo
Hawthornden Cottage				55°51′38″N 3°08′08″W	Category C(S)	44143	Upload Photo
Polton Bank, St Ann's Mount				55°52′16″N 3°07′50″W	Category B	13206	Upload Photo
Melville Castle, Lodge At Walled Garden				55°53′25″N 3°06′42″W	Category C(S)	13019	Upload Photo
Polton Road, Polton Summerhouse				55°52′27″N 3°07′16″W	Category B	13020	Upload Photo
Dryden Tower				55°52′10″N 3°10′07″W	Category B	13032	Upload another image
Lasswade, 3 Kevock Road, Eskgrove, Including Boundary Walls, Gatepiers, Conservatory And Summerhouse				55°52′49″N 3°07′32″W	Category B	7385	Upload Photo
Lasswade, Greenfield Lodge, Including Gatepiers, Gates And Outbuilding				55°52′44″N 3°07′23″W	Category C(S)	7402	Upload Photo
Roslin Curling Pond, Building				55°51′29″N 3°10′59″W	Category C(S)	49691	Upload Photo
Rosslynlee Hospital, Including Gate Lodge, Gatepiers, Railings And Staff Cottages				55°50′08″N 3°10′26″W	Category C(S)	44926	Upload Photo
Lasswade, 12 Kevock Road, The Old Lodge, Including Gatepiers, Gates And Boundary Walls				55°52′47″N 3°07′38″W	Category C(S)	44156	Upload Photo
Lasswade, Wadingburn Lane, Fettes Mount Including Conservatory, Gatepiers And Boundary Walls				55°52′56″N 3°07′36″W	Category B	44162	Upload Photo
Lasswade Viaduct				55°52′46″N 3°07′10″W	Category B	13621	Upload Photo
Melville Castle, Walled Garden				55°53′29″N 3°06′40″W	Category B	13509	Upload Photo
Midfield House, Lasswade, Including Boundary Wall To Garden				55°51′51″N 3°07′56″W	Category B	13022	Upload Photo
Rosslyn Chapel (Episcopal), Formerly Collegiate Church Of St Matthew, Including Vaults, Burial Ground And Boundary Walls				55°51′19″N 3°09′36″W	Category A	13028	Upload another image
Auchindinny House, Including Gatepiers, Boundary Walls And Outbuildings				55°50′22″N 3°11′47″W	Category A	13034	Upload Photo
Mavisbank House, Doocot				55°52′47″N 3°07′49″W	Category A	7386	Upload another image
Melville Castle, South Driveway Bridge				55°53′19″N 3°06′30″W	Category B	7396	Upload Photo

== Key ==
The scheme for classifying buildings in Scotland is:

- Category A: "buildings of national or international importance, either architectural or historic; or fine, little-altered examples of some particular period, style or building type."
- Category B: "buildings of regional or more than local importance; or major examples of some particular period, style or building type, which may have been altered."
- Category C: "buildings of local importance; lesser examples of any period, style, or building type, as originally constructed or moderately altered; and simple traditional buildings which group well with other listed buildings."

In March 2016 there were 47,288 listed buildings in Scotland. Of these, 8% were Category A, and 50% were Category B, with the remaining 42% being Category C.

== See also ==
- List of listed buildings in Midlothian
