= List of listed buildings in Cockpen, Midlothian =

This is a list of listed buildings in the parish of Cockpen in Midlothian, Scotland.

== List ==
| Name | Location | Date Listed | Grid Ref. (Note: Sometimes known as OSGB36, the grid reference (where provided) is based on the British national grid reference system used by the Ordnance Survey. • "Guide to National Grid". Ordnance Survey. • "Get-a-map". Ordnance Survey.) | Geo-coordinates | Notes | LB Number (Note: Historic Environment Scotland assign a unique alphanumeric identifier to each designated site in Scotland, for listed buildings this always begins with "LB", for example "LB12345".) | Image |
|---|---|---|---|---|---|---|---|
| Dalhousie Grange, Including Gatepiers | | | | 55°51′50″N 3°05′27″W | Category C(S) | 783 | Upload Photo |
| Dalhousie Castle, Bridge Over River South Esk To Se Of Castle | | | | 55°51′37″N 3°04′55″W | Category C(S) | 785 | Upload another image |
| Dalhousie West Lodge, Including Railings | | | | 55°51′45″N 3°05′29″W | Category C(S) | 46130 | Upload Photo |
| Millbank House, Including Ancillary Structures, Walled Garden, Gates, Gatepiers And Boundary Walls | | | | 55°50′39″N 3°03′40″W | Category C(S) | 46136 | Upload Photo |
| Redheugh Farmhouse And Steading, Including Ancillary Structures And Boundary Walls | | | | 55°51′08″N 3°04′08″W | Category C(S) | 46139 | Upload Photo |
| Upper Dalhousie Farmhouse And Farm, Including Ancillary Structure, Implement Shed, Gates, Gatepiers And Walled Garden | | | | 55°51′26″N 3°05′58″W | Category C(S) | 46141 | Upload Photo |
| Cockpen Farm | | | | 55°51′44″N 3°04′38″W | Category C(S) | 49645 | Upload Photo |
| Cockpen Old Parish Church And Burial Ground | | | | 55°51′31″N 3°04′38″W | Category B | 787 | Upload Photo |
| Kirkhill Hotel, Formerly Kirkhill House, Including Railings | | | | 55°50′53″N 3°04′26″W | Category B | 788 | Upload Photo |
| Gowkshill Farmhouse And Steading, Including Chimney Stalk | | | | 55°51′21″N 3°03′23″W | Category C(S) | 46133 | Upload Photo |
| Grove Farm, Former Dalhousie Walled Garden | | | | 55°52′00″N 3°04′42″W | Category C(S) | 46134 | Upload Photo |
| The Glebe House (Former Cockpen Manse), Including Stable Block | | | | 55°51′56″N 3°05′28″W | Category B | 781 | Upload Photo |
| Newtongrange, 21 And 23 Murderdean Road | | | | 55°51′54″N 3°04′07″W | Category C(S) | 46137 | Upload Photo |
| Dalhousie Castle, Footbridge To Nw Of Castle | | | | 55°51′49″N 3°05′21″W | Category C(S) | 48975 | Upload Photo |
| Newtongrange, Lady Victoria Colliery | | | | 55°51′42″N 3°04′04″W | Category A | 14604 | Upload another image See more images |
| Cockpen And Carrington Parish Church, Including Gates, Gatepiers, Boundary Wall And Letter Box | | | | 55°51′58″N 3°05′21″W | Category A | 780 | Upload another image |
| Arniston Policies, Rustic Bridge Over Gore Water | | | | 55°50′44″N 3°04′11″W | Category B | 46124 | Upload Photo |
| Dalhousie Castle, Folly Tower On W Bank Of River South Esk | | | | 55°51′34″N 3°04′52″W | Category C(S) | 46127 | Upload another image |
| Rosewell, The Chesters Hotel | | | | 55°51′59″N 3°07′07″W | Category C(S) | 46140 | Upload Photo |
| Cockpen Farm, Folly (Tower) On E Bank Of River South Esk | | | | 55°51′46″N 3°04′44″W | Category C(S) | 786 | Upload Photo |
| Bonnyrigg, Cockpen Road, Courtyard Country Inn, Dovecot And Stable Block | | | | 55°52′05″N 3°05′36″W | Category B | 45781 | Upload Photo |
| Brewers Bush | | | | 55°51′29″N 3°04′14″W | Category C(S) | 46126 | Upload Photo |
| Dalhousie Mains, Farmhouse And Steading, Including Gatepiers And Boundary Walls | | | | 55°52′24″N 3°04′57″W | Category B | 46128 | Upload Photo |
| 1-4 (Inclusive Nos) Dalhousie Mains Cottages | | | | 55°52′26″N 3°04′48″W | Category C(S) | 46129 | Upload Photo |
| Glenesk (Former Manse), Including Boundary Wall | | | | 55°51′29″N 3°04′38″W | Category C(S) | 46131 | Upload Photo |
| Kirkhill Lodge, Including Gatepiers, Railings And Boundary Walls | | | | 55°50′50″N 3°03′52″W | Category C(S) | 46135 | Upload Photo |
| Newtonloan, Hunterfield Road, Newtonloan Lodge, Including Gates, Gatepiers And Boundary Walls | | | | 55°51′16″N 3°03′40″W | Category B | 44623 | Upload Photo |
| Dalhousie Castle | | | | 55°51′39″N 3°04′57″W | Category A | 784 | Upload another image |
| Newtonloan, Toll House | | | | 55°51′23″N 3°03′55″W | Category C(S) | 46138 | Upload Photo |
| Newbattle Abbey Policies, The King's Gate | | | | 55°52′33″N 3°04′53″W | Category B | 789 | Upload Photo |
| Bonnyrigg, Cockpen Road, Courtyard Country Inn, Including Boundary Wall | | | | 55°52′05″N 3°05′35″W | Category B | 46125 | Upload another image |
| Gorebridge, Engine Road, Emily Bank, Including Gates, Gatepiers And Boundary Walls | | | | 55°50′51″N 3°03′35″W | Category C(S) | 46132 | Upload Photo |

== Key ==
The scheme for classifying buildings in Scotland is:

- Category A: "buildings of national or international importance, either architectural or historic; or fine, little-altered examples of some particular period, style or building type."
- Category B: "buildings of regional or more than local importance; or major examples of some particular period, style or building type, which may have been altered."
- Category C: "buildings of local importance; lesser examples of any period, style, or building type, as originally constructed or moderately altered; and simple traditional buildings which group well with other listed buildings."

In March 2016 there were 47,288 listed buildings in Scotland. Of these, 8% were Category A, and 50% were Category B, with the remaining 42% being Category C.

== See also ==
- List of listed buildings in Midlothian
