= Uttershill Castle =

Coordinates: 55.8221°N 3.2169°W

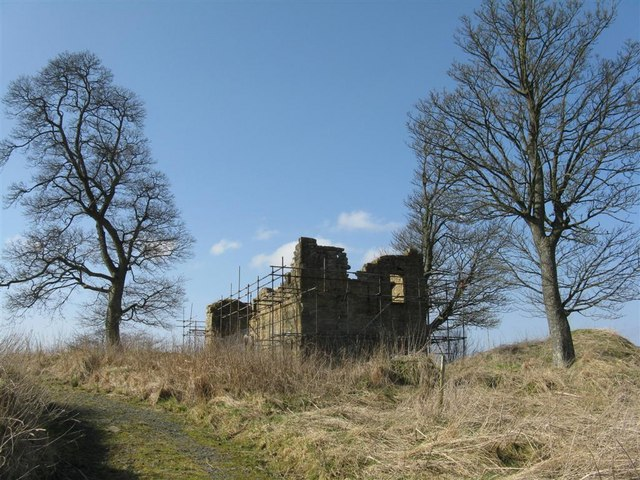
Uttershill Castle in 2009.

Uttershill Castle is a ruinous 16th-century tower house, about 0.5 miles (0.8 km) south of Penicuik, Midlothian, Scotland, south of the river North Esk, and west of the Black Burn.

Alternative names are Utters Hill and Outtershill Castle.

== History ==
The property belonged to the Prestons of Gorton and Craigmillar. In 1646 the Countess of Eglinton lived here. It was purchased by the Clerks of Penicuik in 1702. The castle was a ruin prior to the start of the 19th century, although it was used as a gunpowder store.

The excavation was carried out in October 1994, in advance of a proposed restoration programme.

== Structure ==
The castle stands on a level base, bounded to the north-east by a scarp slope, about 0.8 metres (2 ft 7 in) high. The castle had two storeys or more, and may have had a courtyard. It had a vaulted basement, and a hall on the first storey, reached by a straight stair. In the 17th century an unvaulted kitchen, with a chamber above, was added, but it has long since been demolished. The castle was built of freestone rubble, and was probably harled. It was rectangular, measuring externally 65 feet (20 m) north east to south west by 23 feet (7.0 m). The entrance was at ground level on the south side.

== See also ==
- Castles in Great Britain and Ireland
- List of castles in Scotland
