= Clerk (surname) =

Surname list

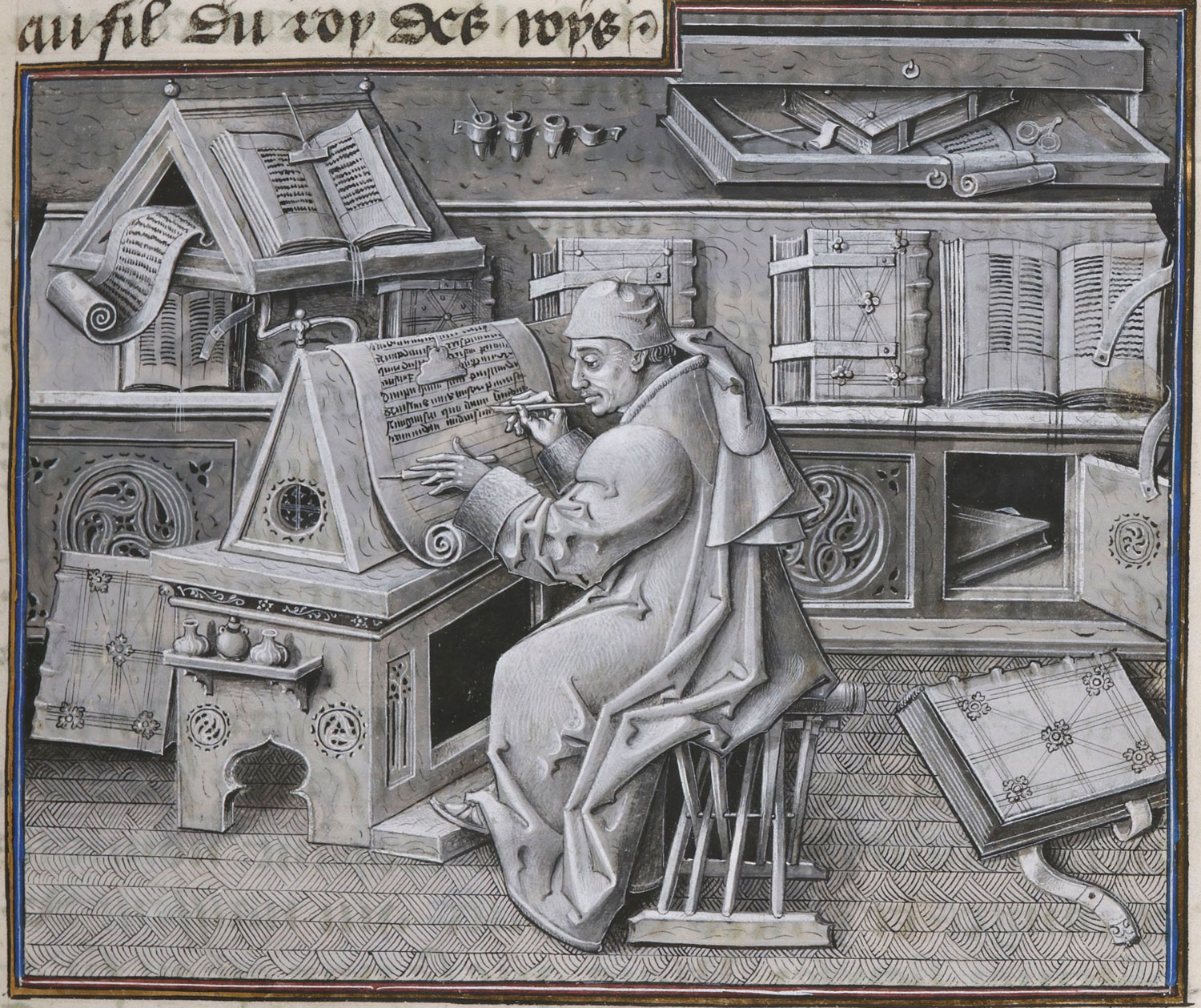
- A scribe or clerk, the occupation from which the name derives

Origin
- Language: Old English
- Meaning: clerk, scribe, secretary, scholar
- Region of origin: England

Other names
- Variant forms: Clark, Clarke Clerc, de Clerk, De Clerq, De Clerc, Klerk/de Klerk

Clerk (/klɑːrk/ or /klɜːrk/) is a patronymic surname of English-language and Scottish-Gaelic origin, ultimately derived from the Latin clericus meaning "scribe", "secretary" or a scholar within a religious order, referring to someone who was educated. Clark evolved from "clerk". First records of the name are found in 12th century England. The name has many variants.

The surname is attached to particular families or noble lineages, such as the Clerk baronets, created in the Baronetage of Nova Scotia by Letters Patent, dated 24 March 1679, and the Ghanaian historic Clerk family of Accra, a distinguished intellectual clan, founded in 1843, that produced a number of pioneering scholars and clergy on the Gold Coast.

== List ==
Notable people with the surname include:

- Alexander A. Clerk (born 1947), Ghanaian American sleep medicine specialist and psychiatrist
- Alexander Worthy Clerk (1820–1906), Jamaican Moravian missionary to the Gold Coast
- Archibald Clerk (1813–1887), Church of Scotland minister and a leading Gaelic scholar of the Victorian era
- Carl Henry Clerk (1895–1982), Ghanaian agricultural educator, journalist, editor and Presbyterian minister
- Clive Clerk (1945–2005), Trinidad-born actor, dancer, interior designer and painter
- Dugald Clerk (1854–1932), Scottish engineer and designer of the world's first successful two-stroke engine
- Gabrielle Clerk (1923–2012), Canadian psychologist and professor
- George Clerk (disambiguation)
  - George Clerk (diplomat) (1874–1951), British diplomat
  - George C. Clerk (1931–2019), Ghanaian botanist and plant pathologist
- Sir George Clerk, 6th Baronet (1787–1867), Scottish politician
- Sir George Clerk-Maxwell, 4th Baronet (1715–1784), Scottish landowner
  - George Russell Clerk (1800–1889), civil servant in British India
- Sir James Clerk, 3rd Baronet (died 1782)
- James Clerk Maxwell (1831–1879), Scottish mathematical physicist
- Jane E. Clerk (1904–1999), pioneer woman educationalist administrator on the Gold Coast
- John Clerk (disambiguation)
  - John Clerk (bishop) (died 1541), English cleric
  - John Clerk Maxwell of Middlebie (1790–1856), Scottish advocate
  - John Clerk of Eldin (1728–1812), Scottish merchant, naval author, artist, geologist and landowner
  - John Clerk of Pennycuik (1611–1674), Scottish merchant and archivist of family papers
  - John Clerk, Lord Eldin (1757–1832), Scottish judge
- Sir John Clerk, 1st Baronet (died 1722), Scottish politician
- Sir John Clerk, 2nd Baronet (1676–1755), Scottish politician, lawyer, judge and composer
- Sir John Clerk, 5th Baronet (1736–1798), Royal Navy officer
- Matilda J. Clerk (1916–1984), Ghanaian medical pioneer and science educator
- Nicholas Clerk (disambiguation)
  - Nicholas Clerk (politician) (fl. 1407), English politician and the Member (MP) of the Parliament of England for Exeter in 1407
  - Nicholas T. Clerk (1930–2012), Ghanaian academic, administrator and Presbyterian minister
  - Nicholas Timothy Clerk (1862–1961), Basel-trained theologian and missionary on the Gold Coast
- Pauline M. Clerk (1935–2013), Ghanaian civil servant, diplomat and presidential advisor
- Robert Clerk (disambiguation)
  - Robert Clerk (c. 1720–1797), British engineer officer
- Samuel Clerk, Anglican priest of the 17th century, Archdeacon of Derby
- Theodore S. Clerk (1909–1965), Ghanaian urban planner and architect
