= Sir George Clerk, 8th Baronet =

Lt.-Col. Sir George Douglas Clerk, 8th Baronet, of Penicuik JP DL (17 May 1852 – 30 November 1911), was a Scottish soldier and baronet.

== Early life ==
Clerk was born on 17 May 1852 in London, England. He was the son of Sir James Clerk, 7th Baronet and Jane Calvert Henderson. Among his siblings was Susan Edith Clerk (wife of Sir Alan Seton-Steuart, 4th Baronet).

His paternal grandparents were Sir George Clerk, 6th Baronet and the former Maria Anne Law (the daughter of Ewan Law MP, brother of Edward Law, 1st Baron Ellenborough). His paternal grandfather was Maj.-Gen. Douglas Mercer-Henderson and the former Susan-Arabella Rowley (a daughter of Sir William Rowley, 2nd Baronet).

He matriculated at Exeter College, Oxford, on 15 October 1870.

== Career ==
Upon the death of his father on 17 November 1870, he succeeded as the 8th Baronet Clerk, of Penicuik, Edinburgh. He held the office of Justice of the Peace and Deputy Lieutenant of Midlothian.

In 1872, he was a Lieutenant in the 2nd Life Guards before becoming Captain of the Edinburgh County Militia and Major 1st Administrative Battalion Midlothian Rifle Volunteers. He was a Lieutenant-Colonel and Honorary Colonel of the 3rd Battalion, East Surrey between 1899 and 1904 during which time he fought in the Boer War.

== Personal life ==
On 4 January 1876, Clerk married Aymée Elizabeth Georgiana Millikin-Napier (d. 1947), a daughter of Sir Robert Milliken-Napier, 9th Baronet and Anne Salisbury Meliora Ladaveze Adlercron, at St. John's Church, Johnstone, Scotland. Together, they were the parents of:

- Sir George James Robert Clerk, 9th Baronet (1876–1943), who married Hon. Mabel Honor Dutton, a daughter of Col. Hon. Charles Dutton (a younger son of the 3rd Baron Sherborne), 1903. Among Mabel's siblings were James Dutton, 6th Baron Sherborne and Vice Admiral Arthur Brandreth Scott Dutton (who married Doriel Hay, a daughter of Sir John Hay, 9th Baronet and Anne Milliken-Napier, sister to Sir George's wife, Aymée).

He died on 30 November 1911 at age 59.

Baronetage of Nova Scotia
Preceded by James Clerk	Baronet (of Penicuik); 1870–1911	Succeeded by George James Robert Clerk
