= Nicholas Clerk =

Nicholas Clerk may refer to:

- Nicholas Clerk (politician) (fl. 1407), English politician, MP for Exeter
- Nicholas T. Clerk (1930–2012), Ghanaian academic, administrator and Presbyterian minister
- Nicholas Timothy Clerk (1862–1961), Basel-trained theologian and missionary on the Gold Coast

== See also ==
- Nicholas Clark (disambiguation)
