= Clerk baronets =

Baronetcy from Penicuik, Scotland

Escutcheon of the Clerk baronets of Penicuik

There has been one creation of a baronetcy with the surname Clerk (/klɑːrk/) (as distinct from Clark, Clarke and Clerke). It was created in the Baronetage of Nova Scotia by Letters Patent dated 24 March 1679, for John Clerk of Pennycuik (or Penicuik; see Penicuik House). His father, the merchant John Clerk, had returned from Paris in 1647 with a considerable fortune and purchased the lands of Penicuik in Midlothian. The 1st Baronet acquired the lands of Lasswade, Midlothian, in 1700. The second Baronet built Mavisbank House near Loanhead between 1723 and 1727.

The 3rd Baronet, James, laid out plans for a new town in 1770, inspired by the local plans for a New Town in Edinburgh which were by then coming into reality. The rebuilding included a new church, St Mungos, in 1771, reputedly by Sir James himself.

The family are said by Anderson (1867) to date from at least 1180 AD when one of them appeared as a witness to a donation to Holyrood Abbey by William The Lion. John Scougal is known to have painted at least two portraits of the first baronets.

A number of the lineage are buried in Penicuik Old Parish Churchyard, with both a memorial gateway and a mausoleum to their memories.

== Clerk of Penicuik (1679) ==
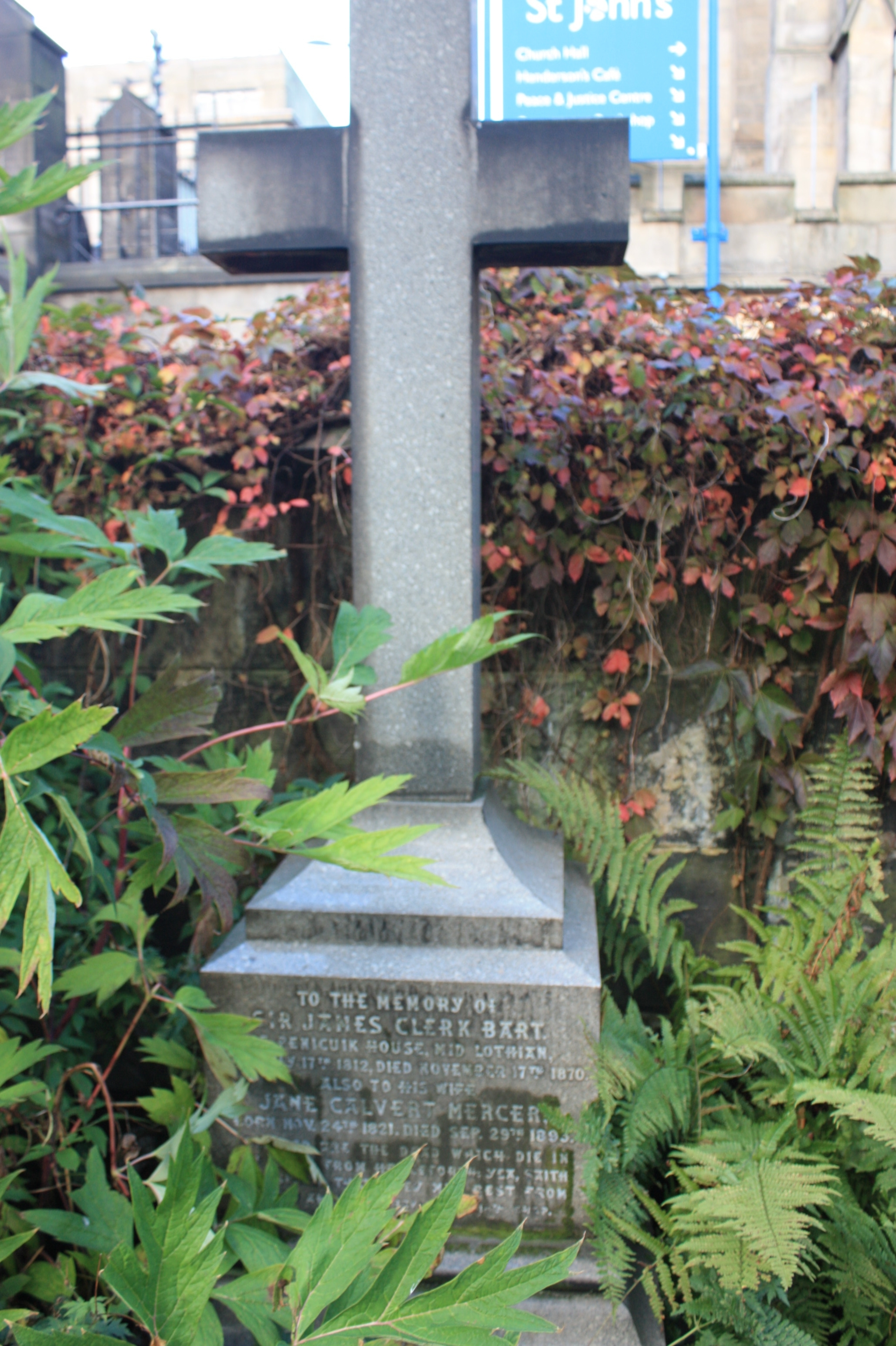
The grave of Sir James Clerk, 7th Baronet, St John's Edinburgh

- Sir John Clerk, 1st Baronet (died 1722)
- Sir John Clerk, 2nd Baronet (1676–1755)
- Sir James Clerk, 3rd Baronet (died 1782) without issue
- Sir George Clerk-Maxwell, 4th Baronet (1715–1784) succeeded his brother
- Sir John Clerk, 5th Baronet (died 1798) without issue
- Sir George Clerk, 6th Baronet (born 1787) nephew of the 5th Bt
- Sir James Clerk, 7th Baronet (1812–1870)
- Sir George Douglas Clerk, 8th Baronet (1852–1911)
- Sir George James Robert Clerk, 9th Baronet (1876–1943)
- Sir John Dutton Clerk, 10th Baronet (1917–2002)
- Sir Robert Maxwell Clerk, 11th Baronet (born 1945). Lord-Lieutenant of Midlothian (2020-2025).

The heir apparent is George Napier Clerk (born 1975).

== See also ==
- Clark baronets
- Clarke baronets
- Clerke baronets
- Clerk family
- Clerk surname
