= Robert Fullerton =

First Governor of the Straits Settlements

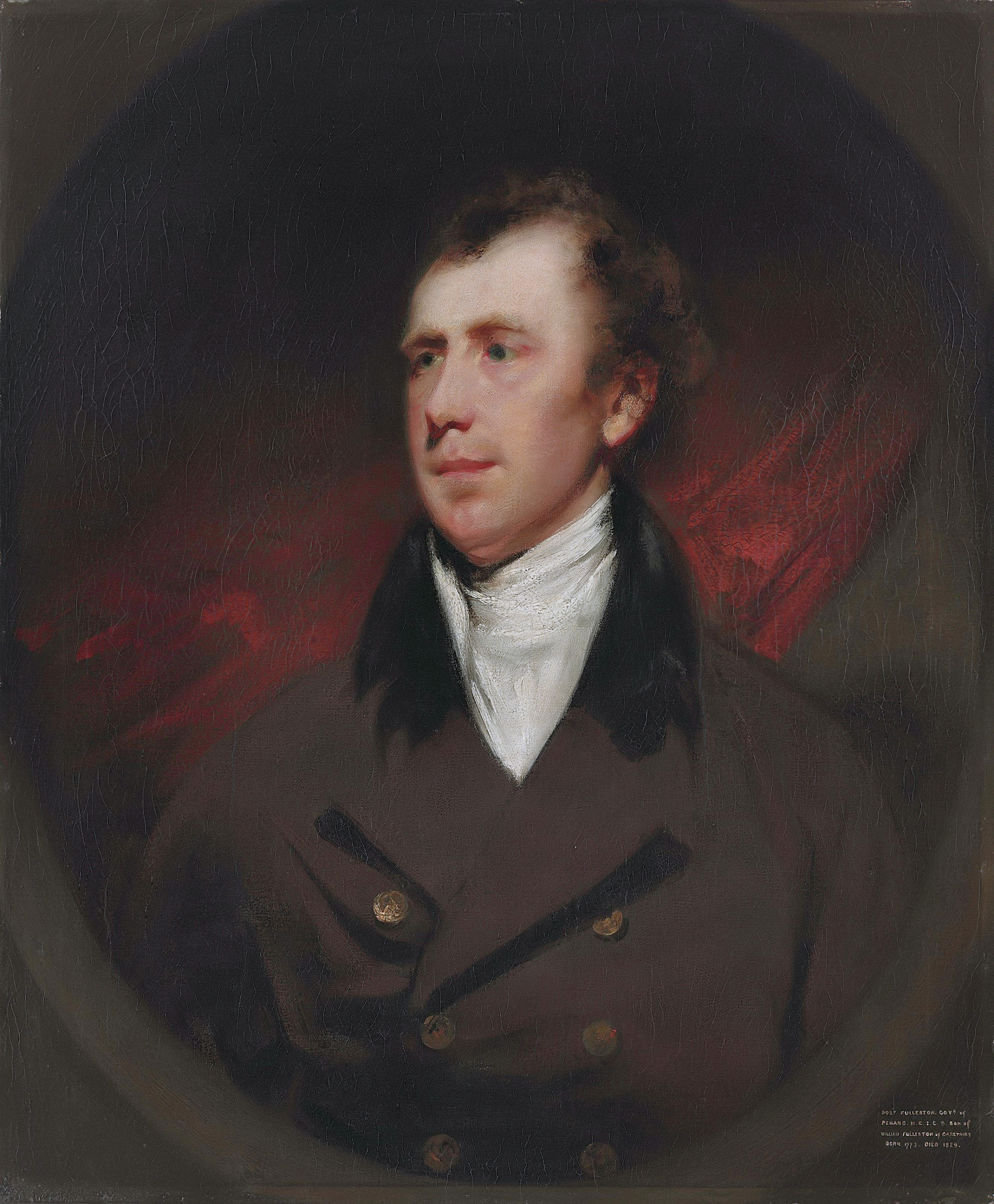

1st Governor of the Straits Settlements
- In office 27 November 1826 – 12 November 1830
- Monarch: George IV
- Preceded by: Position established
- Succeeded by: Robert Ibbetson

Personal details
- Born: 16 January 1773 Edinburgh, Scotland
- Died: 6 June 1831 (aged 58) London, England
- Parents: William Fullerton of Carstairs (father); Isabella Johnston (mother)
- Relatives: Elizabeth Fullerton-Elphinstone (sister); William Fullerton (brother); Margaret Fullerton (sister); Mary Fullerton (sister); John Fullerton (brother); Edward Fullerton (brother); George Fullerton (brother); Judith Fullerton (sister); James Fullerton (brother); Sarah Fullerton (sister); Charles Fullerton (brother)
- Profession: Colonial administrator

Robert Fullerton (16 January 1773 – 6 June 1831) was a Scottish colonial administrator who served as the first Governor of the Straits Settlements, appointed by the East India Company.

== Early life ==
Fullerton was born in Edinburgh, the son of William Fullerton of Carstairs, and raised on Nicolson Street in the city's south side. He was one of twelve children including his younger brother John Fullerton, Lord Fullerton.

== Career ==
Fullerton received his original appointment on 4 February 1824 and was governor of Prince of Wales Isle from 20 August 1824 to 1826, after which he became the governor of the newly incorporated Straits Settlements of Singapore (including Christmas Island and the Cocos-Keeling group), Penang (including Province Wellesley), and Malacca under the British administration in India. The governor of the Straits Settlements was assisted by three resident councillors; the resident councillor of Penang, the resident councillor of Malacca and the resident councillor of Singapore.

Robert Fullerton became the first governor of the Straits Settlements, based in Penang, and served in that capacity from 27 November 1826 to 12 November 1830. The departure of the last governor is also recorded in the Gazette. The issue of 29 August 1830 carries the following notification:

"The Honorable the Governor, being about to proceed to Singapore and Malacca, NOTICE is hereby given that this station will cease to be the seat of Government from the date of his departure, and the charge of the settlement will devolve upon the Honorable Robert Ibbetson, Resident Councillor; to whom all local references will be made."

Fullerton is credited with the creation of the municipal system in the Straits Settlements – Buckley stated that the first trace of subsequent municipalities can be traced to 1827. Fullerton, with the sanction of the Court of Directors and Board of Control, regulated for the appointment of "The Committee of Assessors," for the purposes of ensuring the streets of Penang were cleared, watched and kept in repair. By the late 1820s and early 1830s, Fullerton became involved in the Naning War and sided against local chiefs, in which he believed Naning should be completely under British sovereignty based on past treaties, and that the Penghulu of Naning was like any of the other Penghulus appointed within Malacca territory and held his "powers of investiture from the Malacca Government". This would lead to the Naning War, one of the earliest major conflicts between local leaders and the British.

== Personal life ==
Fullerton's elder sister Elizabeth married William Fullerton-Elphinstone, a director of the East India Company.

Fullerton died in London, England in 1831.

== Gallery ==
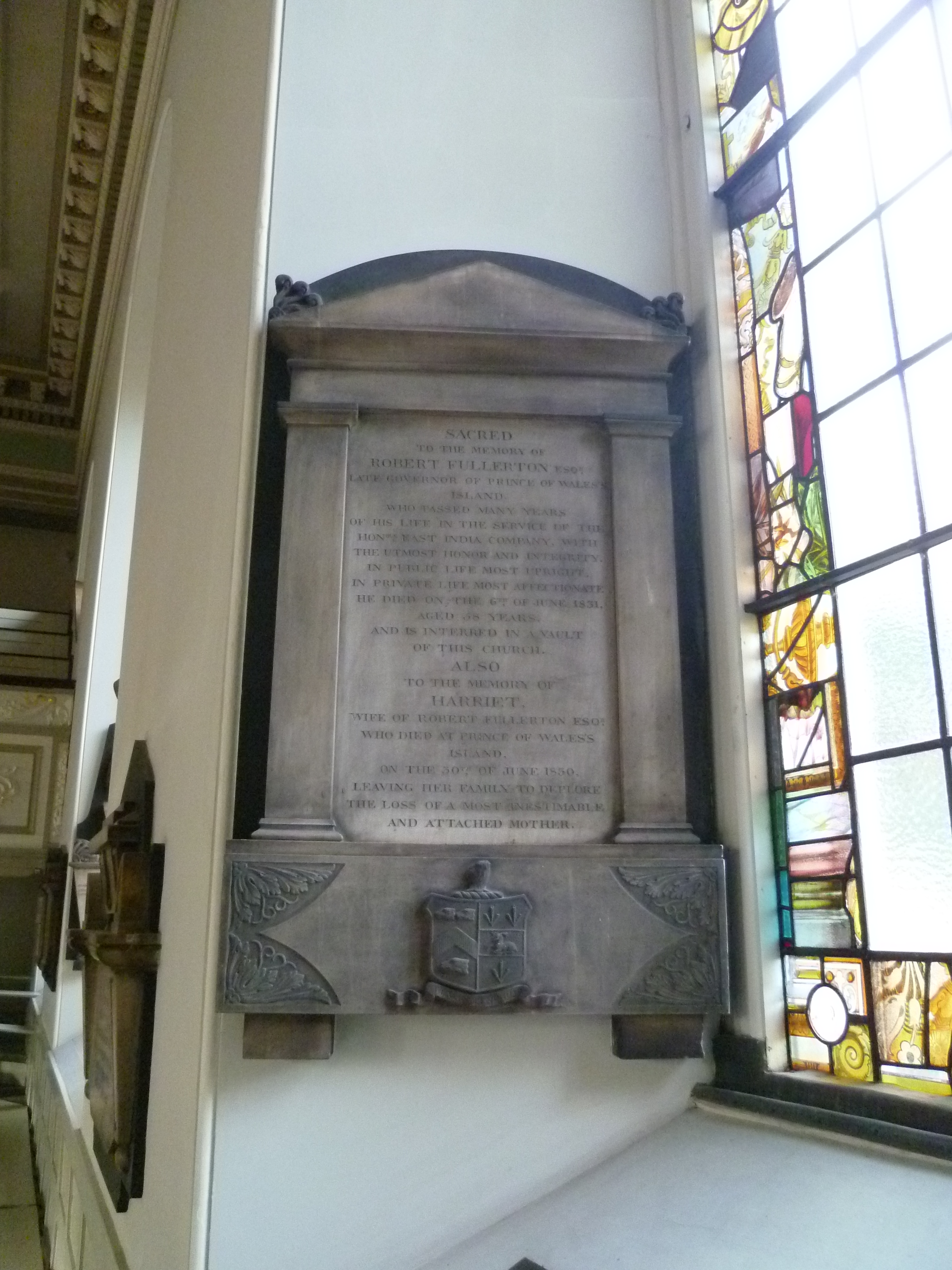
His memorial plaque in London

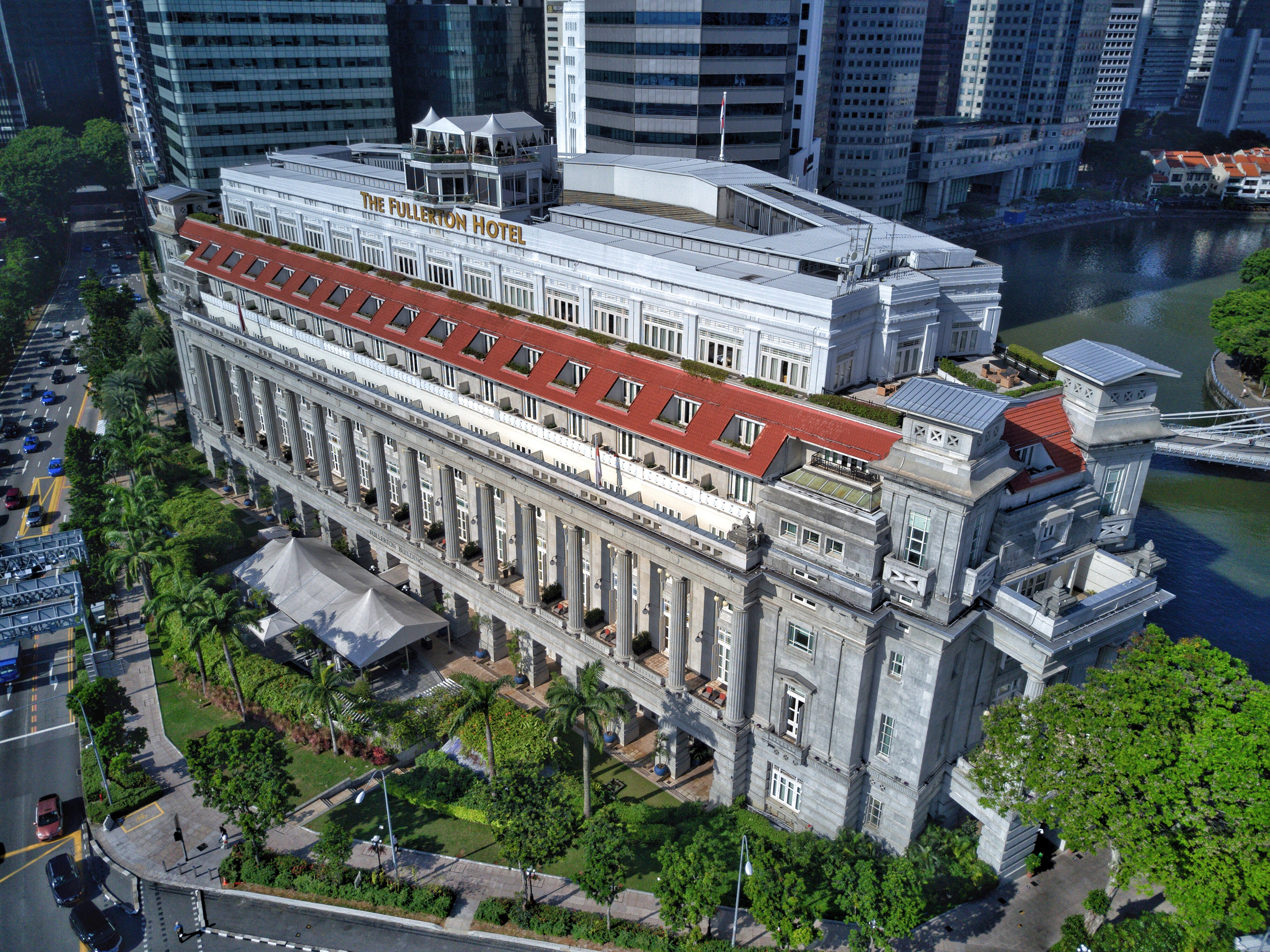
Aerial perspective of the Fullerton Hotel, Singapore named after Robert Fullerton. Shot October 2018.

== See also ==
- Governor of Penang
- The Fullerton Hotel Singapore

Government offices
New title	Governor of the Straits Settlements; 1826 – 1830	Succeeded by Robert Ibbetson
