= John Fullerton, Lord Fullerton =

Scottish judge

The Honourable Lord Fullerton FRSE
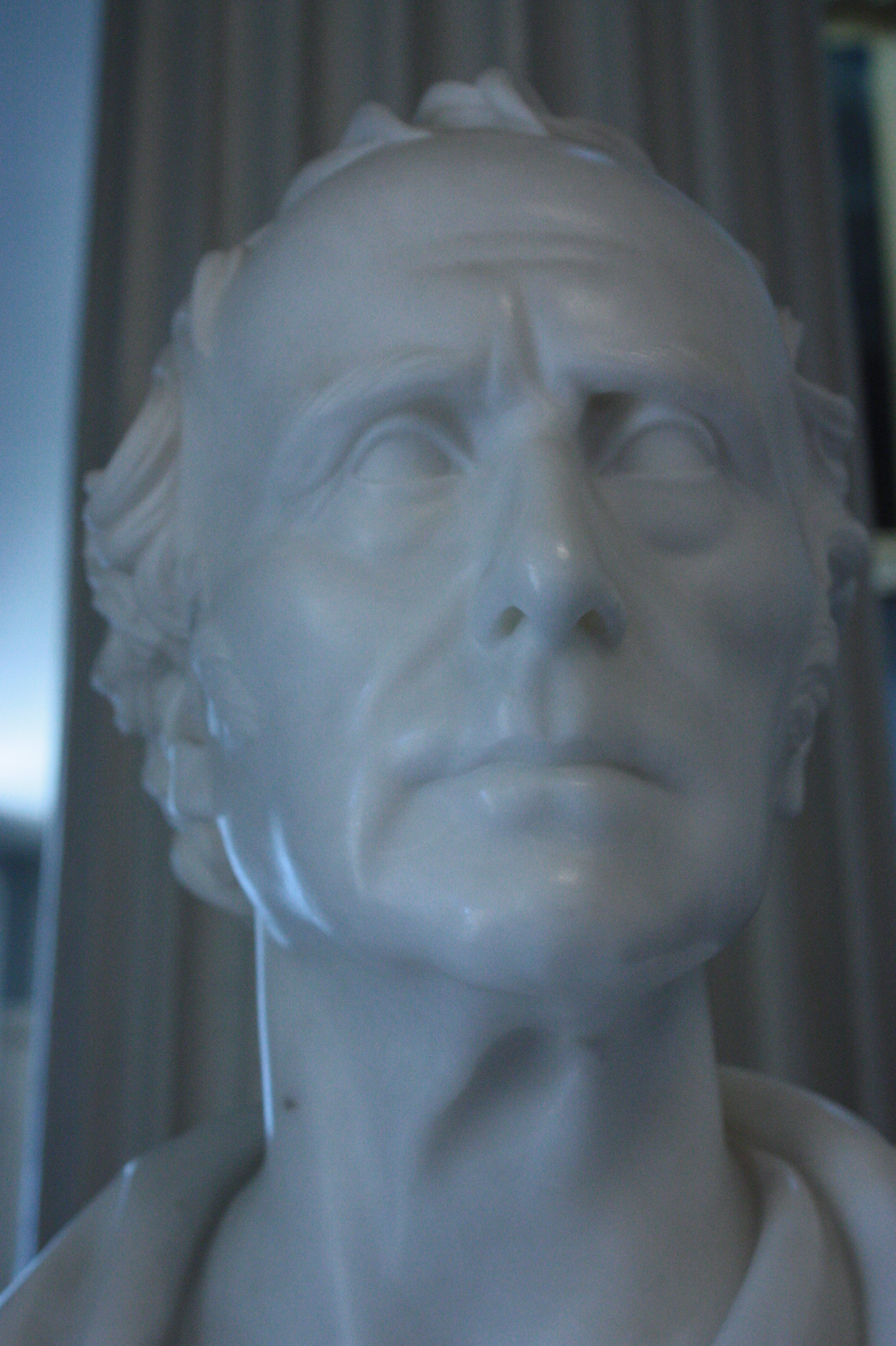
- John Fullerton, Lord Fullerton, bust in Signet Library

Senator of the College of Justice
- In office 17 February 1829 – 3 December 1853
- Preceded by: John Clerk, Lord Eldin
- Succeeded by: Hercules James Robertson

Personal details
- Born: John Fullerton; 16 December 1775 Edinburgh, Scotland
- Died: 3 December 1853 (aged 77) Edinburgh, Scotland
- Spouse: Georgina Hay Macdowall (m. 1817–1853)
- Children: Isabella Graeme Fullerton (daughter); William Fullerton (son); James Fullerton (son); Mary Fullerton (daughter); Elizabeth Elphinstone Fullerton (daughter); George Ferguson Fullerton (son); Georgina Fullerton (daughter); Henry Monteith Fullerton (son)
- Parents: William Fullerton of Carstairs (father); Isabella Johnston (mother)
- Relatives: Elizabeth Fullerton-Elphinstone (sister); William Fullerton (brother); Margaret Fullerton (sister); Robert Fullerton (brother); Mary Fullerton (sister); Edward Fullerton (brother); George Fullerton (brother); Judith Fullerton (sister); James Fullerton (brother); Sarah Fullerton (sister); Charles Fullerton (brother)
- Education: Edinburgh University
- Occupation: Senator
- Profession: Law

John Fullerton, Lord Fullerton, FRSE (16 December 1775 – 3 December 1853) was a Scottish judge.

== Early life ==
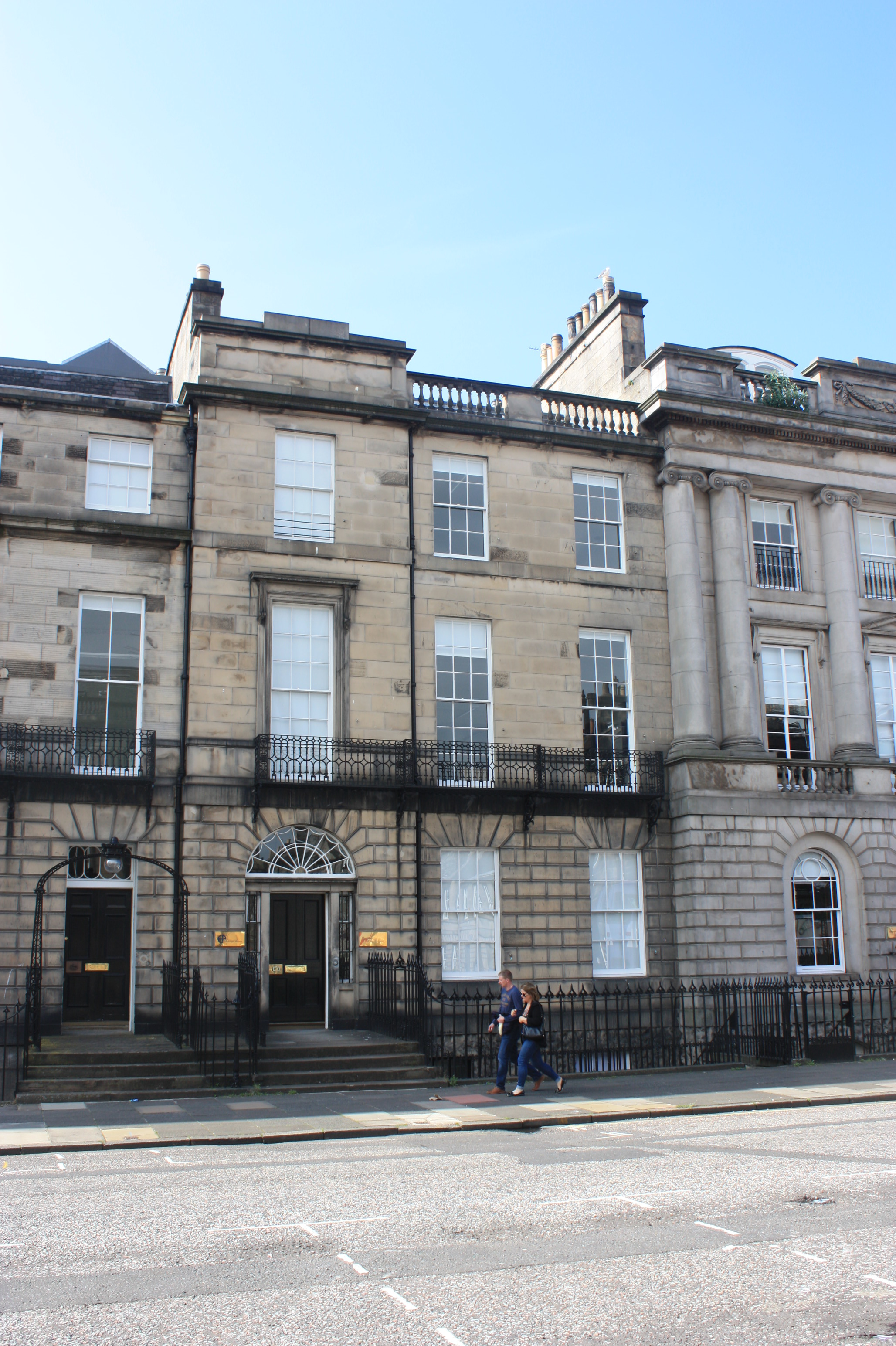
Lord Fullerton's home, 27 Melville Street, Edinburgh

He was born in Edinburgh on 16 December 1775 one of 12 children and second son of Isabella and William Fullerton Esq of Carstairs. He was raised in a large house on Nicolson Street in Edinburgh's Southside. His elder sister Elizabeth married William Fullerton-Elphinstone a Director of the East India Company.

He attended the High School in Edinburgh and then studied law at the University of Edinburgh, qualifying as an advocate on 17 February 1798.

In 1816 he was elected a Fellow of the Royal Society of Edinburgh. His proposers were John Playfair, Thomas Thomson, Sir David Brewster and John Gordon.

He became a Senator of the College of Justice on 17 February 1829, and adopted the title Lord Fullerton, succeeding John Clerk, Lord Eldin. He then lived at 27 Melville Street in a newly built townhouse in Edinburgh's west end.

In the Disruption of 1843 Fullerton spoke largely in the defence of the established Church of Scotland within the lengthy legal debates. His arguments failed, therefore permitting the split.

He died at home 33 Moray Place on the Moray Estate in Edinburgh on 3 December 1853 in Edinburgh.

His biography was written by Lord Strathclyde.

== Family ==
In 1817 he married Georgina Hay Macdowall. They had eight children. Their children were Isabella Graeme Fullerton, William Fullerton, James Fullerton, Mary Fullerton, Elizabeth Elphinstone Fullerton, George Ferguson Fullerton, Georgina Fullerton and Henry Monteith Fullerton.
