= Fordell Castle =

Scottish tower house building

Coordinates: 56°03′13″N 3°22′17″W

Designations

Inventory of Gardens and Designed Landscapes in Scotland
- Official name: Fordell Castle
- Designated: 30 March 2005
- Reference no.: GDL00182

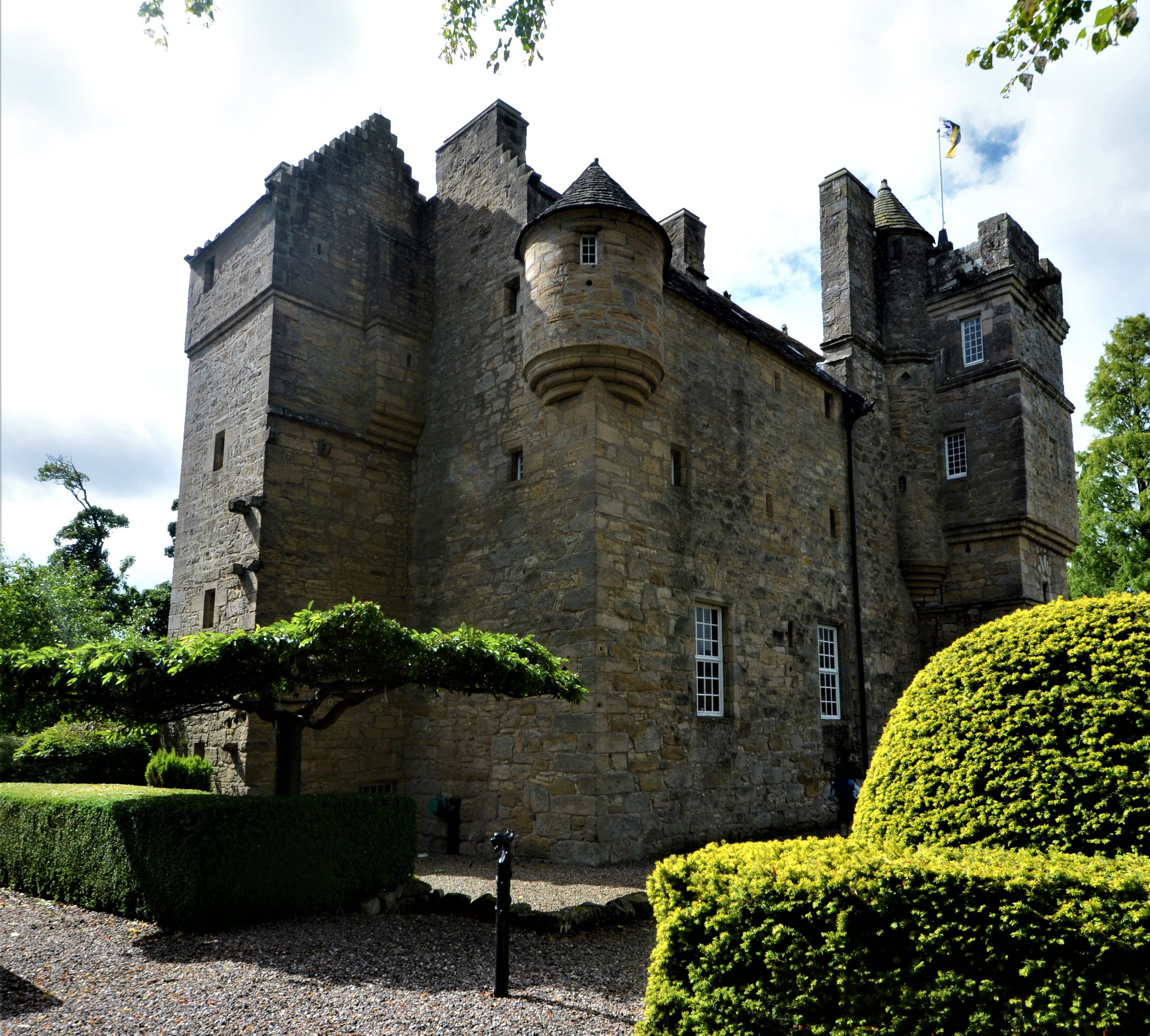
Fordell Castle

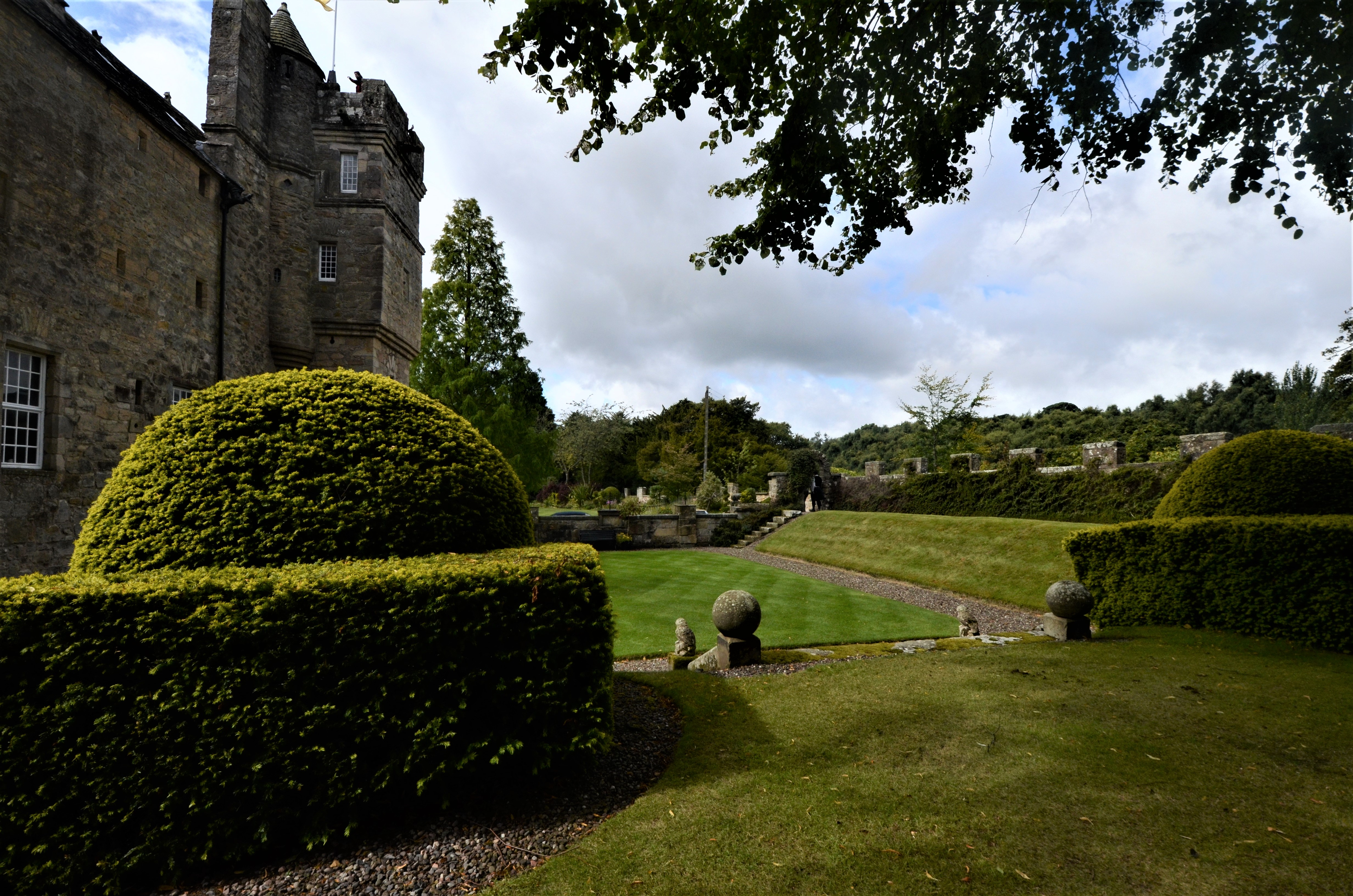
Fordell Castle, North side, and Barmkin Wall

Fordell Castle is a restored 16th-century tower house, located 1.25 miles (2.01 km) north-west of Dalgety Bay and 2 miles (3.2 km) east of Dunfermline, in Fife, Scotland. Parts of the castle date from before 1566, though most dates from 1580 or later. The chapel was rebuilt in 1650. The interior of the castle was substantially renovated in the 1960s, with additional major renovations to the castle interiors and chapel in the early 2000s. The estate is in private ownership and not available for public tour.

== Architecture ==
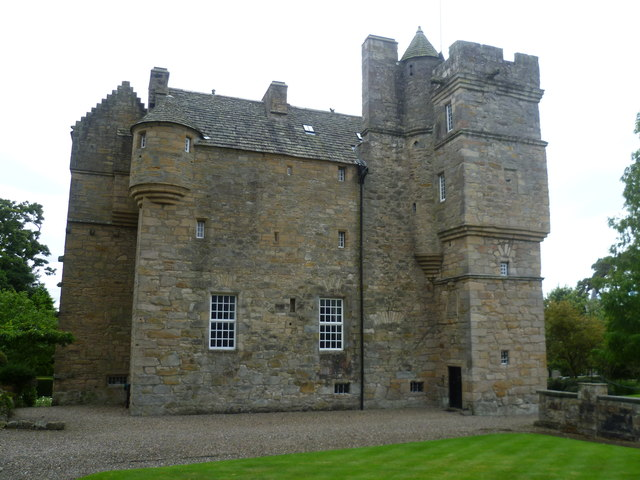
Fordell Castle

The castle is a fortified house (fortalice) designed on a Z-plan running east–west, with square towers at the north-west and south-east corners, each containing a circular staircase. "Externally, Fordell remains pretty much as it was when first built, a simply treated, dignified dwelling, on which corbelled turetts and projections, happily grouped, relieve the plane wall-surfaces below." Fordell Castle is the only example of a tower house with two main stairs, each with its own door to the outside. The entrance is at the foot of the north stair tower and is through a studded door with a metal grate (yett) behind. It gives access to a vestibule. Stairs lead down to three vaulted basement chambers. The western chamber included stocks and branks, but the room has since been converted to a wine cellar. A rogue's collar or jougs hangs near the front entrance to the castle.

The first floor contains the Great Hall to the west; the great stone fireplace has a cast iron grate and stone surround. A "witch stone" carving above the entrance to the Great Hall is said to depict the daughter of James Henderson, 3rd of Fordell, Margaret Echlin (née Henderson) of Pittadro, who was accused of witchcraft and imprisoned in 1649. Prior to being tried, she was found dead, apparently from poison.

There is a smaller withdrawing room to the east of the Great Room. The paneled ceiling has star and half moon mouldings, reflecting motifs in the Henderson coat of arms. Reclaimed timber from Edinburgh Castle and reclaimed Italian Carrera tiles floors were added in recent renovations.

At gallery level is the main private apartment, which has a paneled ceiling with star and half moon moulding. Off this room is a modern bathroom. Also at this level is the Laird's Study, with a stone fireplace and access to the second spiral stair. Above the main stair head is a chamber known as Queen Mary's Room; it is vaulted and paneled, and has a stone fireplace.

A small area of flat roof is castellated, and has a flagpole and wrought-iron beacon basket. The lintel of the door in the north tower is inscribed I.H (for James Henderson) 25 MCH (March) A.D. 1580. Higher is built in a broken lintel, also inscribed I.H. with I.M. for Henderson's wife, Jean Murray of Tullibardine, dated 1580. There is a heraldic panel above with the arms of Henderson and Murray dated 1567, inscribed with the Henderson motto 'Sola Vertus Nobilitat'.

Considered one of the finest details of the castle is the lead gargoyle at the eaves, seen in the north-east view. It "represents a winged four-footed monster, with open mouth and defiant attitude, designed and executed with great spirit."

== History ==
The earliest charter in the Henderson of Fordell papers dates from 1217, when Richard, son of Hugh de Camera, with consent of his wife and son, (also) Richard, grants small parts of the lands of Fordell to the Abbey of Inchcolm.

By 1240, William de Hercht held the lands of Fordell. Sir William de Erth was the Lord of Fordell in 1428. The Fordell lands were divided into fractional portions following William de Erth's death. John Henrisoun was serving as sergeant of Fordell by 1465. It is not known when the original castle structure was constructed, but the main entrance tower is believed to date from the 1400s.

In 1510–1512, James (M. Jacobo) Henrysoun (Henderson), burgess of Edinburgh, and his wife, Elene (née Baty), redeemed from mortgage his inherited fractional portion of the Fordell estate and purchased fractional parts of the lands of Fordell (Fordalis) from at least five others. The land was consolidated into a barony granted by King James IV in 1511.

In the mid-16th century, Mary, Queen of Scots, is said to have stayed here when Marion Scott, one of her ladies-in-waiting, married George Henderson, the laird.

James Henderson, 3rd of Fordell, started to extend the castle in 1566. The masons Robert Peris, James Orrok, and others had made good progress building a "house of great quantity" when they were stopped on 5 June 1567 by William Spittal of Luquhat, who claimed a title to the lands of Fordell. In 1568 the castle was damaged by fire, then rebuilt. Evidence of the fire can be seen to the left of the main entrance tower.

During the late 16th century, the Hendersons began working the estate's rich coal seams that came to form the basis of the estate economy. Sir John Henderson rebuilt St Theriot's Chapel in 1650 for use as a family mausoleum. The castle was damaged by Oliver Cromwell's army troops garrisoned at the castle in 1651. The Hendersons became baronets in 1694 during the reign of Charles II.

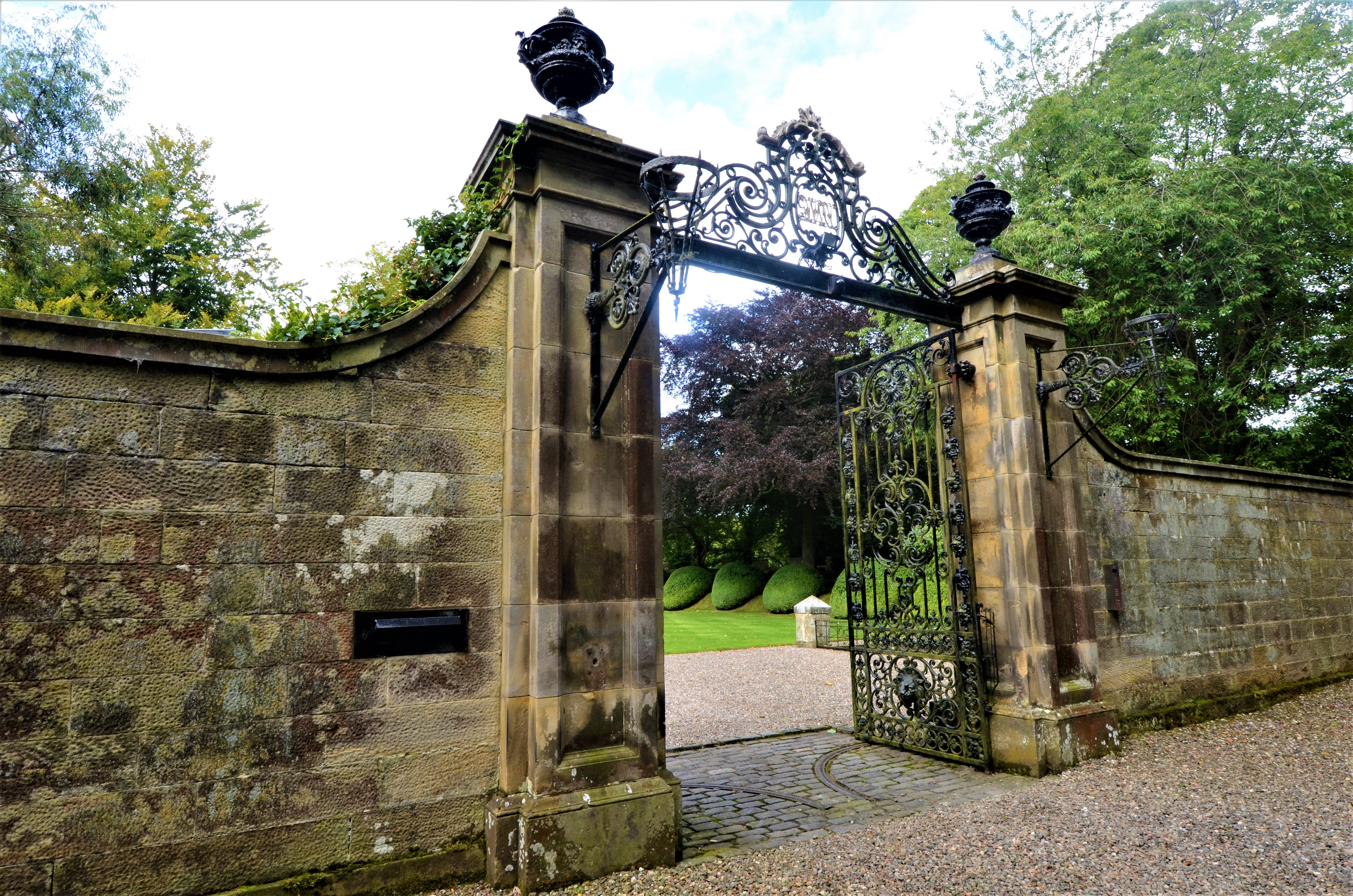
The castle gates

In the 19th century, the family built a large, new mansion – Fordell House – nearby. Fordell House was demolished in the 20th century, and there is now little visible evidence of its existence. During the same period, Fordell Castle was rarely occupied; the main hall is said to have been converted into a stable for a time. George Mercer-Henderson modernized the castle and installed the gates. The north front was rebuilt in 1855 (designed by Robert Hay).

In 1953, John Hampden Mercer-Henderson, 8th Earl of Buckinghamshire, divided the nearly 2,000 acres (810 ha) estate, selling the land to the west of Fordel Burn. The walled garden at Pittadro was sold for use as a commercial nursery.

Fordell was acquired in 1961 by the controversial lawyer and Conservative politician Sir Nicholas Fairbairn (1933–1995). The castle was restored and used as a private residence by Sir Nicholas and his wife Lady Sam Fairbairn. Following his death in 1995, Nicholas Fairbairn was laid to rest in the crypt below the Chapel of St Theriot on the castle grounds.

About 1995, the property was acquired by Dr Lorraine Inglis and her husband, local veterinarian Bill Inglis. About 1999, the property was purchased by Andrew Berry, a businessman who made extensive, high-quality restorations of the castle, chapel, and grounds. In November 2007, Fordell Castle was sold for £3,850,000 to Stuart Simpson, the 17th Baron of Fordell, making it the fifth-highest-priced home ever sold in Scotland. The Castle remains a private residence, and is a category A listed building.

== Estate ownership ==
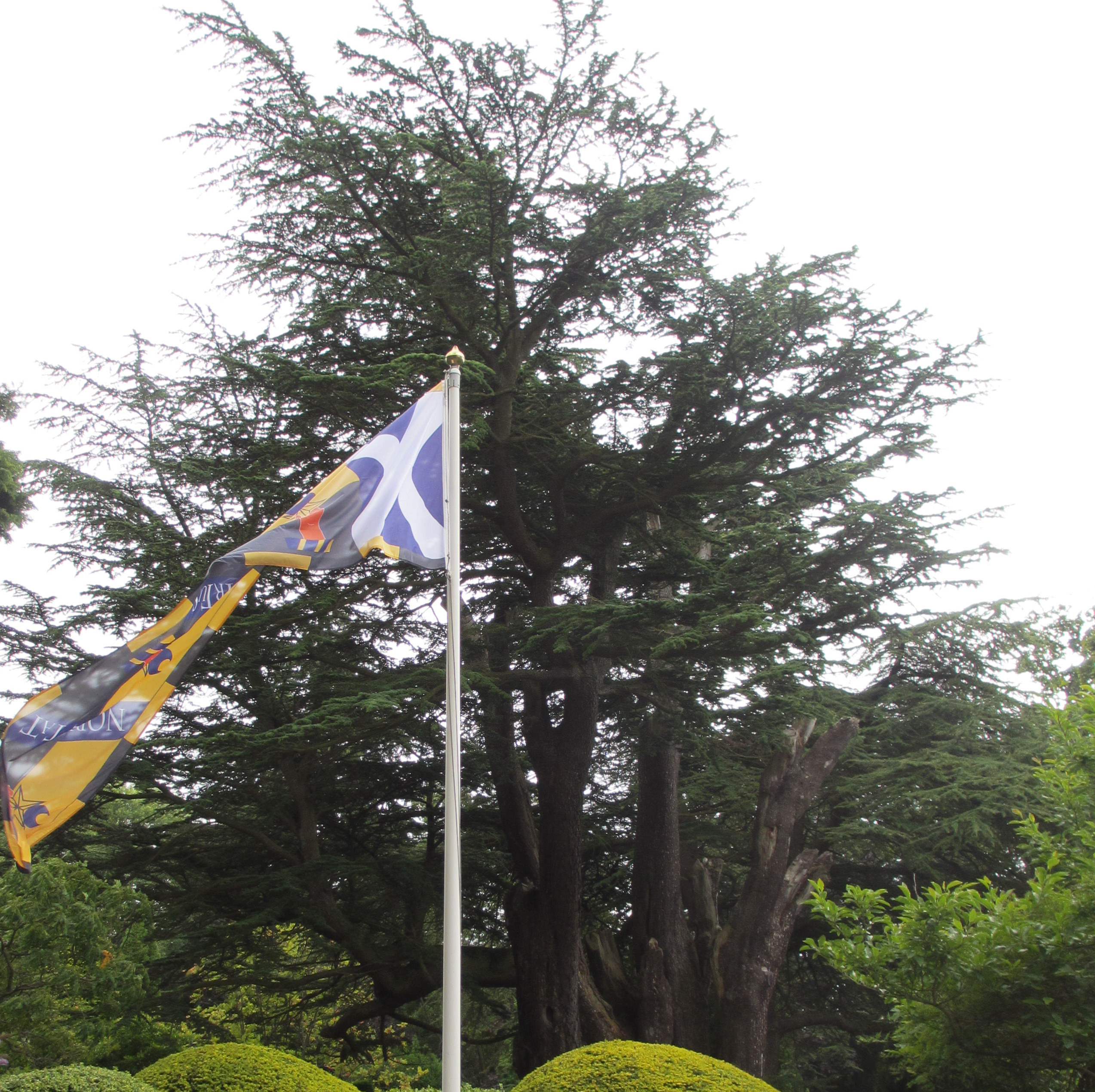
Ancient cedar tree in the gardens

=== Lairds of Fordell ===
- A. and Richard, son of Hugh de Camera (c. 1220). Richard served as a witness to many royal documents for William I of Scotland ("William the Lion").
- William de Hercht (c. 1240)
- Sir William de Erth of Plean and Fordell (–c. 1449). Sir William served as a hostage for James I at Durham in 1423–24 and Pontefract in 1426–27.

=== Scottish Feudal Barony of Fordell ===
- James Henryson, 1st (c. 1450–1513) and Elene (Helen) Baty (–c. 1534). James Henderson was appointed Advocate to King James IV in 1494 and Clerk of Justiciary in 1507. James died with the King at the Battle of Flodden in 1513; his first son died with him.
- George Henderson (Henrisoun), 2nd (1480–1547) and first Katherine Adamson (Adamsoun) (–1539), second Marion (Mariota) Scott (–1566). George Henderson died with his eldest son, William, in 1547 in the Battle of Pinkie.
- James Henderson, 3rd (c. 1544–c. 1610/12) and Jean Murray
- Sir John Henderson, 4th (–1618) and first Agnes Balfour (–c. 1610/15), second Anna Halkat
- Sir John Henderson, 5th (1605–1650) and Margaret Menteath (–1653). Sir John was a distinguished soldier, taken prisoner when commanding at the African Coast, and later fought on the side of the Royalists in the Civil War, when Henderson was invested as a knight by King Charles I.

=== Scottish Baronetcy of Fordell ===
- Sir John Henderson, 1st Baronet (1626–1683) and Margaret Hamiltoun (1635–1671)
- Sir William Henderson, 2nd Baronet (1664–1708) and Jean Hamilton (1667–1731)
- Sir John Henderson, 3rd Baronet (1686–c. 1729/30) and Christian Anstruther (–1760)
- Sir Robert Henderson, 4th Baronet (–1781) and Isabella (Isabel) Stuart (–1796)
- Sir John Henderson, 5th Baronet (1752–1817) and Anne Loudoun Robertson (–1782). Sir John was a politician, serving as Member of Parliament for Fife and for Stirling.
- Sir Robert Bruce Henderson, 6th Baronet (1762–1833) (brother of Sir John).

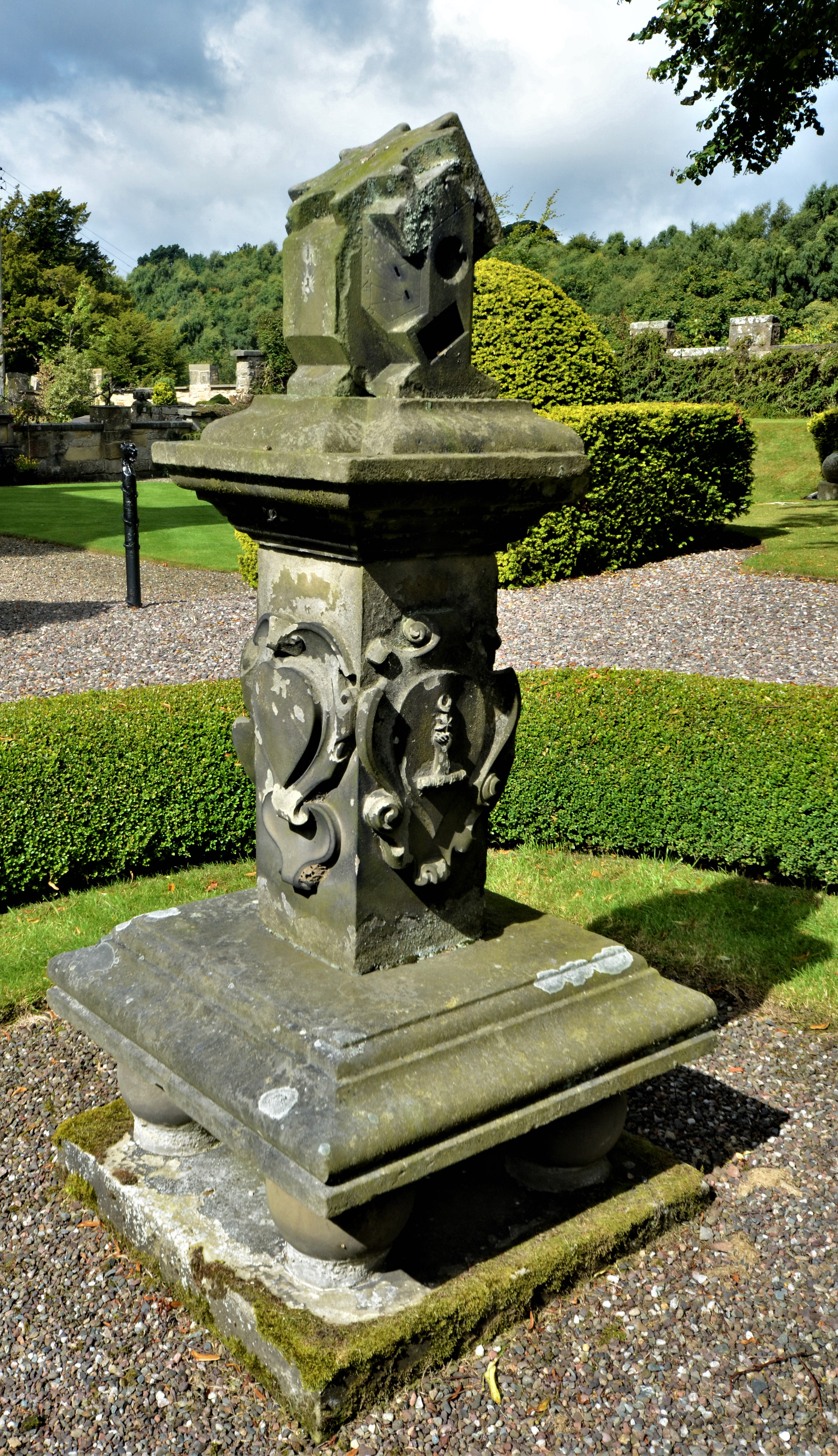
Sundial at Fordell Castle

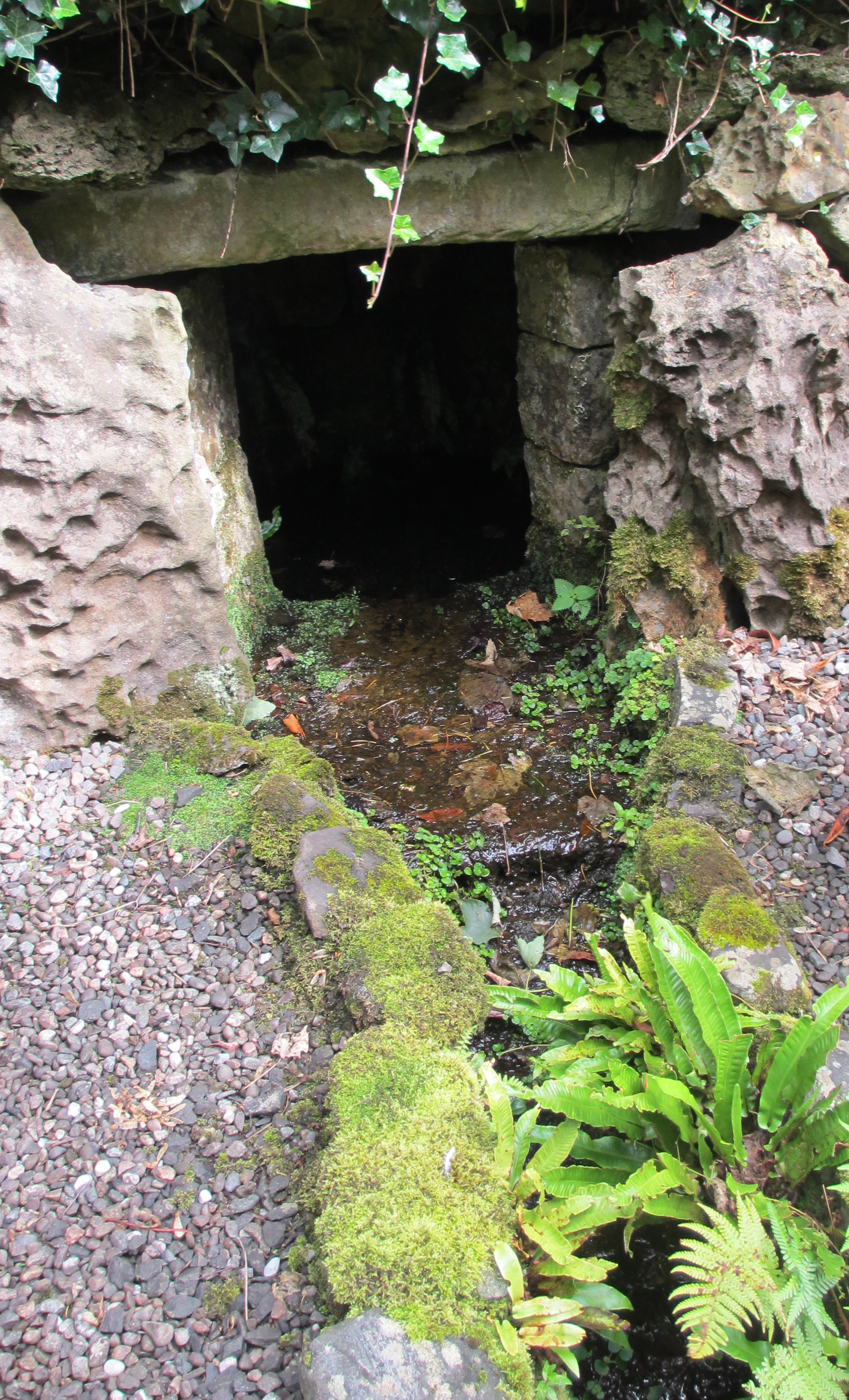
St Theriots Well

=== Further owners and Barons of Fordell ===
- Anne Isabella Henderson (1782–1844; daughter of Sir John Henderson), who married Admiral Sir Philip Charles Calderwood Durham (1763–1845). Sir Philip was a Royal Navy officer whose service in the American War of Independence, French Revolutionary War, and Napoleonic Wars was lengthy, distinguished, and at times controversial.
- George Mercer, later George Mercer Henderson (–1852).
- Lt-Gen. Douglas Mercer-Henderson (c. 1786–1854) and Susan Arabella Rowley. Lt-Gen. Mercer-Henderson was distinguished officer who served in the Peninsular War and was in the Scots Fusiliers Guards for 40 years. By royal licence dated 14 January 1853, Douglas Mercer, afterwards Douglas Mercer-Henderson, and his issue were authorised to take the surname of Henderson in addition to and after Mercer, and to bear the arms of Henderson quarterly with those of Mercer.
- George William Mercer-Henderson (1823–1881) and Alice Primrose
- Edith Isabella Mercer-Henderson (–1902) and Hon. Hew Adam Dalrymple Hamilton Haldane-Duncan-Mercer-Henderson (née Haldane-Duncan) (1820–1900).
- Georgiana Wilhelmina Haldane-Duncan-Mercer-Henderson (1867–1937) and Sidney Carr Hobert-Hampden-Mercer-Henderson (née Hobart-Hampden), 7th Earl of Buckinghamshire (1860-1930).
- John Hampden Mercer-Henderson, 8th Earl of Buckinghamshire (1906–1963).
- James Henderson, author.
- Sir Nicholas Fairbairn (1933–1995) and first Elizabeth MacKay, second Suzanne Mary Wheeler ("Lady Sam") (1942–2002) Fairbairn was a controversial lawyer and Conservative politician.
- Dr Lorraine Inglis and William "Bill" Inglis (1918–1999). Mr Inglis was a respected local veterinarian. Dr Inglis was a close friend of Sir Nicholas Fairbairn.
- Andrew Berry.
- Stuart Simpson and his daughters, Sabrina and Lara. Simpson is an art collector with a background in venture capital.

== Grounds ==
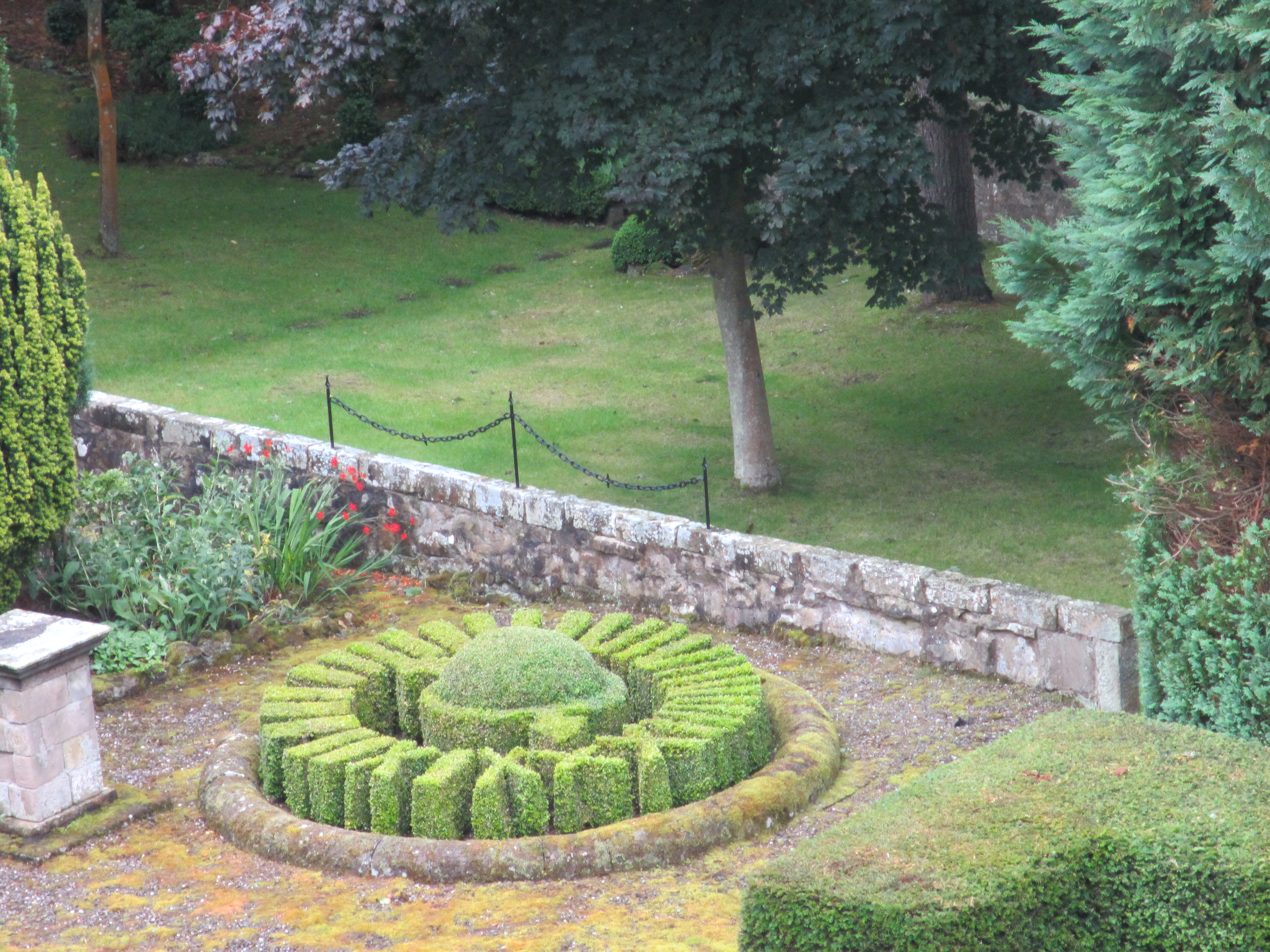
Floral clock in the gardens

The estate currently encompasses about 210 acres (85 ha). The entrance to the Castle passes over a bridge, past a weir that formerly held back the waters of the Fordell Burn, and forming a lake that has now all but silted up. Rhododendrons surround the former lake and are a feature of the estate as a whole, lining the avenues through the estate. The castle sits in dense woodland, with very little opportunity to view it from anywhere, other than up close, or from a significant distance to the south-west.

An irregularly-shaped block of sandstone in a field to the west of the carriage drive is said to have been erected following the 1317 victory of the Scottish, led by William Sinclair, Bishop of Dunkeld, against an English invasion.

The "Witch Knowe" on the right of the carriage drive was used to burn witches, the last in 1649. The "Gallows-tree" blew down by 1887.

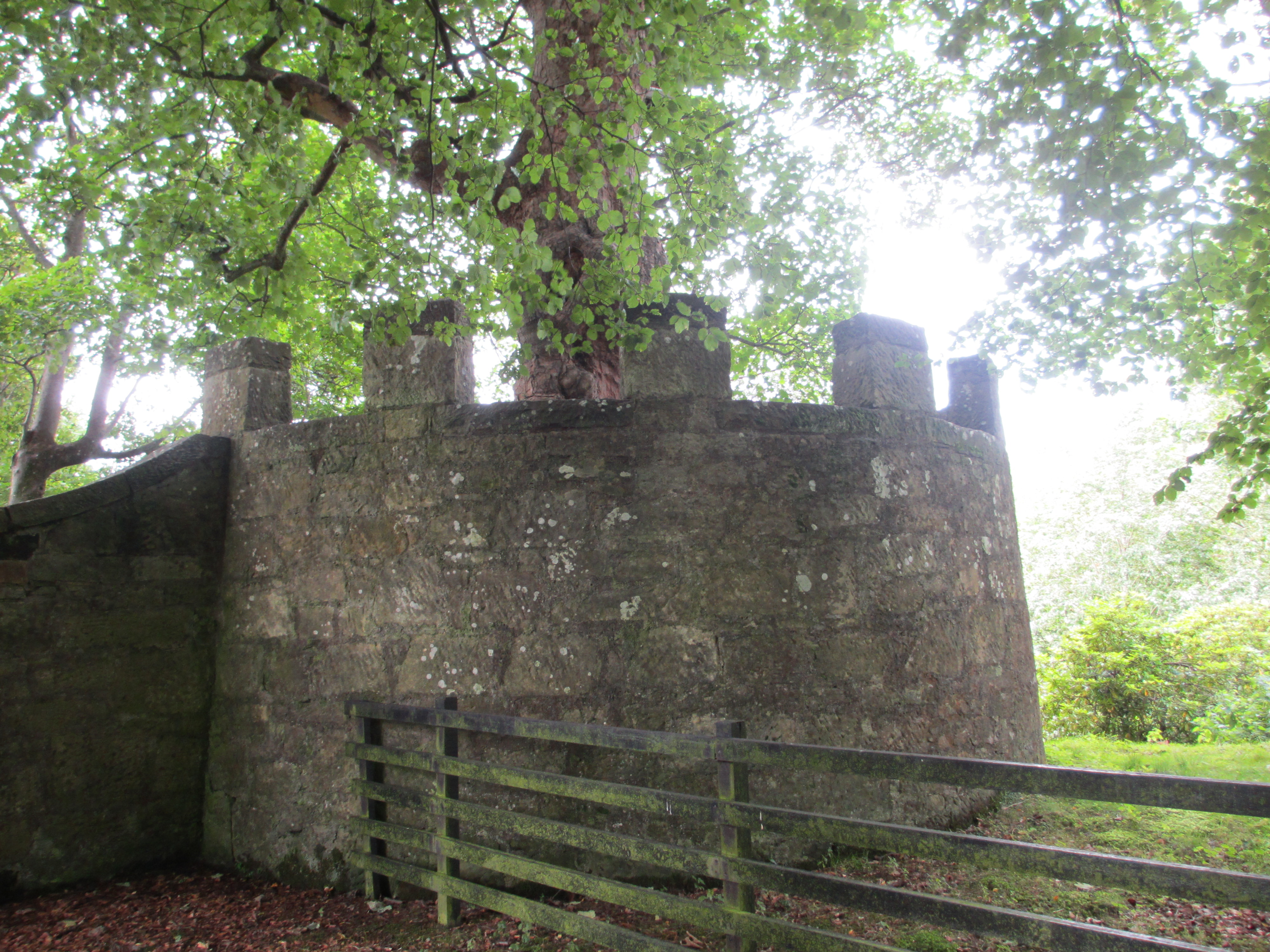
Bastion in the Barmkin Wall

The Castle, garden, and Chapel sit within a roughly trapezoidal area enclosed by a rubble barmkin wall, modified on the east side in the 19th century with castellations and a bastion. The principal entrance lies on this side and is marked by large wrought-iron entrance gates and gate-piers, with large urn finials.

The grounds consist of Italianate gardens, designed by Thomas White, Jr. in 1818. The gardens include an ancient Cedar of Lebanon said to have been planted by Sir Robert Henderson in 1721.

The sundial in the garden is an 1860 copy of the 1644 sundial originally at Pitreavie Castle, Dunfermline. It comprises a square pedestal on four globes supporting a lectern dial. The pedestal features carved escutcheons on two faces with the Henderson family arms.

On the west barmkin wall is the bell originally located in the chapel belfry. It is said to have been purchased by Sir John Henderson, 5th Bart. from a local provost for an extravagant price in order to secure that provost's election vote.

To the south of the barmkin wall is a natural spring called St Theriot's Well. Folklore has it that the well has the extraordinary property of securing what one wishes, while drinking of its water.

=== Saint Thereota's Chapel ===
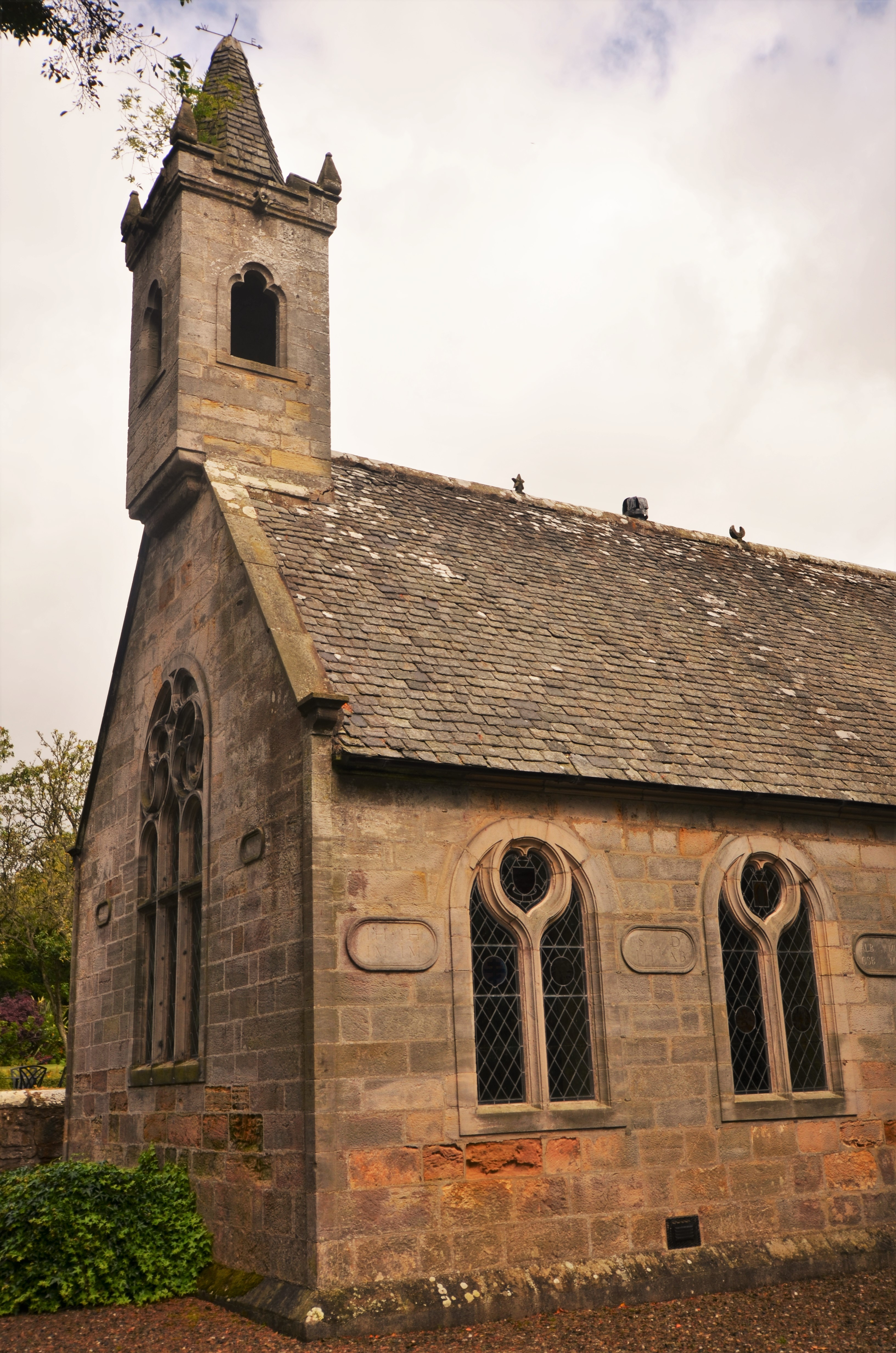
Saint Thereota's Chapel, SW, on ground of Fordell Castle

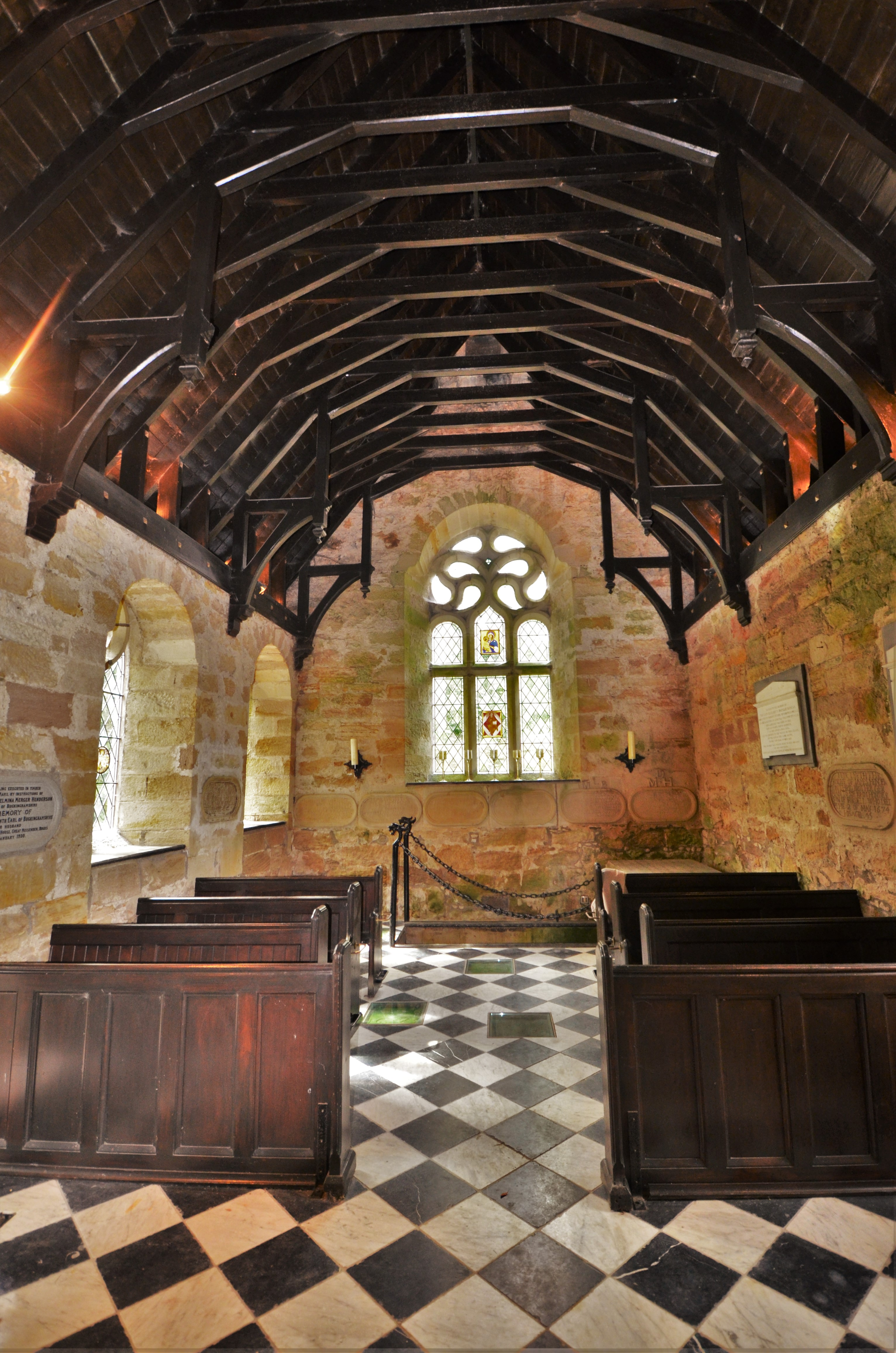
Interior of Saint Thereota's Chapel, on ground of Fordell Castle

About 70 yards (64 m) to the south-west of the castle building within the garden boundary is the mortuary chapel of the Henderson family. It was built on the site of an earlier chapel, dedicated to Saint Therotus, Theoretus or Theriot, an obscure 8th century cleric, who is described by one source as "splendidly apocryphal"; it was first mentioned in 1510 but may have been considerably older. The present building is rectangular, ashlar-built, with a slate roof and a belfry at the western end. It has a Renaissance doorway with the Henderson motto and the date 1650. "The elevations are balanced in the Renaissance manner, but the windows are late Gothic in fashion with traceried heads." The windows are of German and Flemish painted glass date from the 16th century onwards. During some time periods, the chapel was used for public worship. The chapel was renovated in the 1650s and again the early 2000s; Berry family initials are carved to the left of the chapel entrance.

Saint Thereota's Chapel was made a Category A Listed Building in 1972.

== Other features on the estate ==
Close to the Castle, the former Fordell Day Level used to surface. This was a mine "river", connecting the foot of numerous former coal mines, from as far afield as Cowdenbeath, and draining the pits. It was one of Scotland's worst pollution issues, issuing iron-polluted water into the nearby watercourse, but this has been largely improved by the recently completed open-cast mining operations to the North, and the subsequent reparations and reed-bed water treatment facilities.

The remains of one of Scotland's oldest railways runs 400 metres (1,300 ft) to the east of the Castle. The Fordell railway route took coal from the Fife coalfields to the ships in St David's Bay, now part of the Dalgety Bay settlement. The original wooden rails are gone, although the embankments, cuttings, and stone bridges remain, and carriages and equipment can be viewed in the Museum of Scotland, Edinburgh.

The former entrance avenue and gates to the east lead to Vantage Farm, a small steading featuring Scotland's only octagonal doocot and ornate farm buildings including clock tower, Grieve's cottage, dairy, and three storey granary. The steading is now exclusively residential.

There is a lodge to the west, known as North Lodge on the Inverkeithing/Crossgates Road, and South Lodge on the Aberdour Road, marking the primary entrances to the former estate.
