= Sir George Clerk, 6th Baronet =

Scottish politician

The Right Honourable Sir George Clerk Bt DL FRS FRSE

Vice-President of the Board of Trade
- In office 5 February 1845 – 29 June 1846
- Monarch: Victoria
- Prime Minister: Sir Robert Peel, Bt
- Preceded by: The Earl of Dalhousie
- Succeeded by: Thomas Milner Gibson

Personal details
- Born: 19 November 1787
- Died: 23 December 1867 (aged 80) Penicuik House, Midlothian
- Citizenship: United Kingdom
- Party: Tory

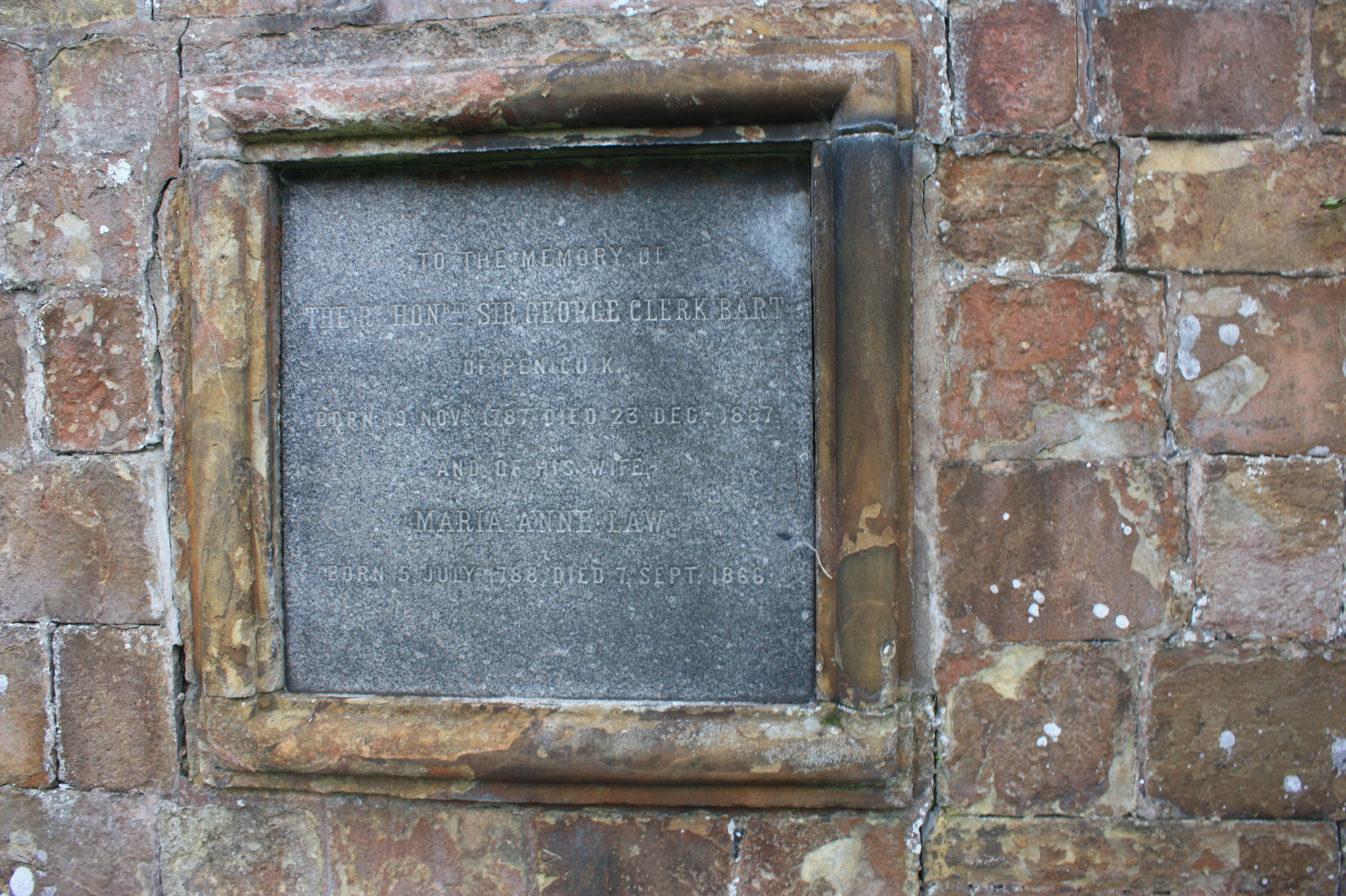
Sir George Clerk's grave, St. Mungo's churchyard, Penicuik

Sir George Clerk of Pennycuik, 6th Baronet, PC, DL, FRS, FRSE (19 November 1787 – 23 December 1867) was a Scottish politician who served as the Tory MP for Edinburghshire, Stamford and Dover.

== Early life ==
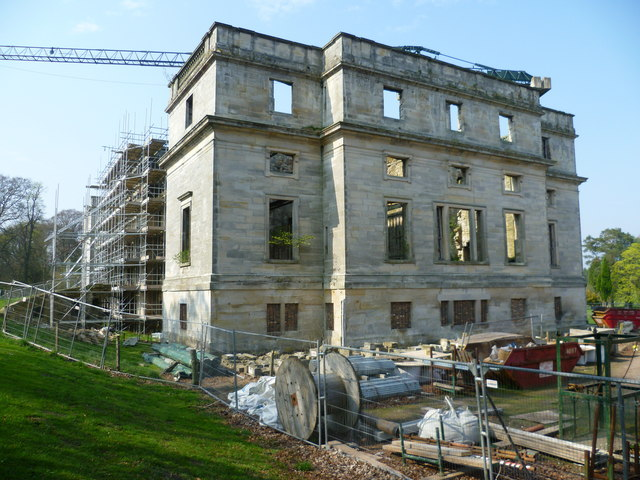
Penicuik House restoration, 2011

Clerk was born near Edinburgh on 19 November 1787. He was the son of Capt. James Clerk (d. 1793), third son of Sir George Clerk-Maxwell, 4th Baronet and Janet Irving. His brother John Clerk-Maxwell of Middlebie, advocate, was father of the mathematical physicist James Clerk-Maxwell. His sister Isabella married the sometime Solicitor General for Scotland, James Wedderburn (1782–1822) of the Wedderburn baronets.

He studied at the High School in Edinburgh and then went to the University of Oxford, graduating DCL in 1810.

== Career ==
Clerk sat as Member of Parliament for Edinburghshire from 1811 to 1832 and again from 1835 to 1837, for Stamford from 1838 to 1847 and then for Dover from 1847 to 1852. He served as one of the Commissioners of Weights and Measures from 1818 to 1821. He held political office as a Lord of the Admiralty from 1819 to 1830 (from 1827 to 1828 he was a member of the Council of the Lord High Admiral (The Duke of Clarence), as Under-Secretary of State for the Home Department from 5 August to 22 November 1830, as Parliamentary Secretary to the Treasury from November 1834 to April 1835, as Financial Secretary to the Treasury from September 1841 to February 1845. In 1845 he was sworn of the Privy Council and appointed Vice-President of the Board of Trade and Master of the Mint, posts he held until the fall of the Tory administration in 1846. He was also a Deputy Lieutenant for Edinburghshire.

=== Later life ===
Sir George served as President of the Zoological Society from 1862 to 1867 and as Chairman of the Royal Academy of Music.

In 1812 he was elected a Fellow of the Royal Society of Edinburgh, his proposers being Thomas Charles Hope, Sir George Stewart MacKenzie and John Playfair. He was elected a Fellow of the Royal Society of London in 1819.

== Personal life ==
On 13 August 1810, Clerk was married to Maria Anne Law (1788-1866), the daughter of Ewan Law MP, brother of Edward Law, 1st Baron Ellenborough. He lived with his family in Penicuik House built by his grandfather. The family (both male and female) played at curling on purpose-built ponds at the house. The family hosted a Grand Curling Match in 1847. Together, they were the parents of:

- Sir James Clerk of Penicuik, 7th Baronet (1812–1870), who married Jane Calvert Henderson, daughter of Maj.-Gen. Douglas Mercer-Henderson and the former Susan-Arabella Rowley (a daughter of Sir William Rowley, 2nd Baronet), in 1851.
- George Edward Clerk (1815–1875), who married Marie Louise Elizabeth Dupuis, a daughter of Casimir Dupuis, in 1849.
- John Clerk (1816–1900), a barrister, Queen's Counsel and Justice of the peace for Leicestershire; who married in 1845 Rose Alice Clothilde Greene, a daughter of Thomas Greene, MP for Lancaster.
- Edward Clerk (1824–1917), who married Alice Bramston, daughter of Thomas William Bramston, in 1864.
- Alexander Clerk (1828–1912), who married Edith Mary Buchanan, a daughter of Dr. Andrew Buchanan, in 1857.
- Elizabeth Harriette Clerk (1833–1909), who married Hon. Edward Charles Buller-Fullerton-Elphinstone, son of Lt.-Col. James Drummond Buller-Fullerton-Elphinstone, in 1859.

Sir George died in December 1867, aged 80, at Pennycuik House, Midlothian. He is buried in the local churchyard, close to his parents' mausoleum in St. Mungo's Churchyard in Penicuik. His wife lies with him.

Parliament of the United Kingdom
Preceded by Robert Saunders-Dundas	Member of Parliament for Edinburghshire; 1811–1832	Succeeded by Sir John Dalrymple, Bt
Preceded by Sir John Dalrymple, Bt	Member of Parliament for Edinburghshire; 1835–1837	Succeeded by William Gibson Craig
Preceded by Thomas Chaplin; Marquess of Granby	Member of Parliament for Stamford; 1838–1847; With: Marquess of Granby	Succeeded by Marquess of Granby; J. C. Herries
Preceded by Sir John Reid, Bt; Edward Royd Rice	Member of Parliament for Dover; 1847–1852; With: Edward Royd Rice	Succeeded by Edward Royd Rice; Viscount Chelsea
Political offices
Preceded by Sir Henry Hardinge	Clerk of the Ordnance; 1827–1828	Succeeded by Spencer Perceval
Preceded by William Yates Peel	Under-Secretary of State for the Home Department; 1830	Succeeded by Hon. George Lamb
Preceded by Charles Wood	Parliamentary Secretary to the Treasury; 1834–1835	Succeeded by Edward Stanley
Preceded by Richard More O'Ferrall	Financial Secretary to the Treasury; 1841–1845	Succeeded by Edward Cardwell
Preceded by The Earl of Dalhousie	Vice-President of the Board of Trade; 1845–1846	Succeeded by Thomas Milner Gibson
Preceded by William Ewart Gladstone	Master of the Mint; 1845–1846	Succeeded by Richard Lalor Sheil
Party political offices
Preceded by William Holmes (to 1832)	Conservative Chief Whip in the House of Commons; 1835–1837	Succeeded by Sir Thomas Fremantle, Bt
Baronetage of Nova Scotia
Preceded by John Clerk	Baronet (of Penicuik); 1798–1867	Succeeded by James Clerk
