= John Clerk, Lord Eldin =

Scottish judge

Lord Eldin
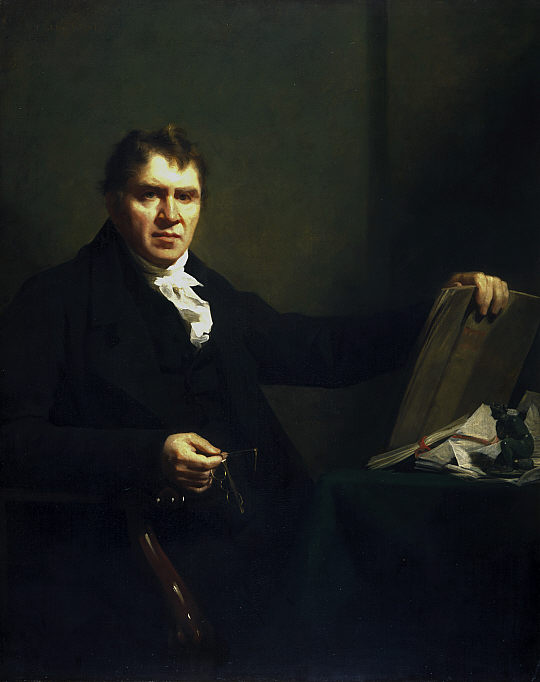
- John Clerk, Lord Eldin, portrait by Henry Raeburn, c.1815.

Solicitor General for Scotland
- In office 1806–1807
- Preceded by: Robert Blair
- Succeeded by: David Boyle

Lord of Session
- In office 10 November 1823 – 1828
- Preceded by: William Bannatyne, Lord Bannatyne
- Succeeded by: John Fullerton, Lord Fullerton

Personal details
- Born: April 1757
- Died: 30 May 1832 (aged 75) Edinburgh

John Clerk, Lord Eldin FRSE FSA (1757– 30 May 1832) was a Scottish judge based in Edinburgh.

== Life ==
He was the eldest son of Susannah Adam, the sister of John Adam and Robert Adam, and John Clerk of Eldin, son of John Clerk of Penicuik. He was born in April 1757 in Edinburgh.

Though originally intended for the Indian Civil Service, he was apprenticed to a Writer to the Signet. After serving his articles he practised for a year or two as an accountant, and eventually was admitted a member of the Faculty of Advocates on 3 December 1785. At this point he is listed as living on Hanover Street in Edinburgh's First New Town.

He was elected a Fellow of the Royal Society of Edinburgh in 1784. He was also a member of the exclusive Bannatyne Club. These drunken affairs resulted in his falling downstairs and breaking his nose after one meeting.

He had an extensive practice at the bar. A keen Whig, on 11 March 1806 he was appointed Solicitor General for Scotland in the Grenville administration, an office which he held during the year that the ministry lasted. His practice at the bar had been for some time falling off, and his health had already begun to fail, when, on 10 November 1823, he was appointed an ordinary Lord of Session in place of William Bannatyne, Lord Bannatyne. Assuming the title of Lord Eldin, he took his seat on the bench 22 November; but his health was poor. After five years of judicial work he resigned in 1828 due to ill-health, and was succeeded by John Fullerton, Lord Fullerton. His final years were spent surrounded by cats, with at least six at any time.

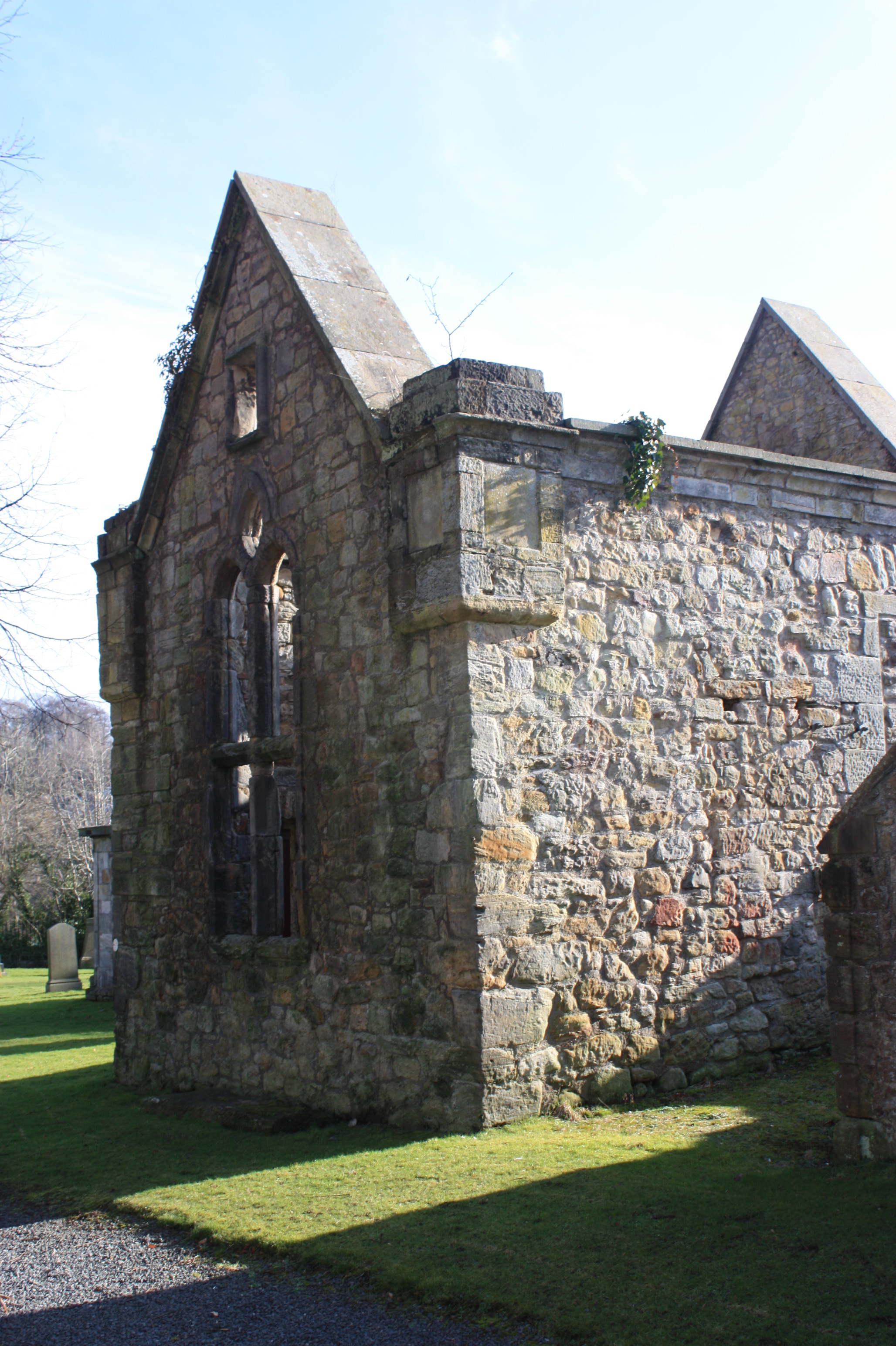
Section of Lasswade old kirk used as the Eldin vault

His father, his uncle George and he himself were friends of the geologist James Hutton. On his father's death in 1812 he inherited the small estate of Eldin near Bonnyrigg.

Clerk died unmarried at his house at 16 Picardy Place, Edinburgh, on 30 May 1832. He was buried with his ancestors in the Eldin vault in the Old Kirk of Lasswade, just south of Edinburgh.

His collection of pictures and prints was sold by auction at his Picardy Place house in March 1833; a serious accident occurred, the floor giving way and dropping from first floor to ground floor due to the number of people in attendance. Many were injured and one, a banker called Smith, was killed.

The small Eldin estate owned by Clerk passed to his brother William Clerk a court clerk, after his death, who in turn bequeathed in to Edinburgh advocate, Charles Ross.

== Artistic recognition ==
He was portrayed by his close neighbour on York Place, Henry Raeburn.
