= Sir John Clerk, 5th Baronet =

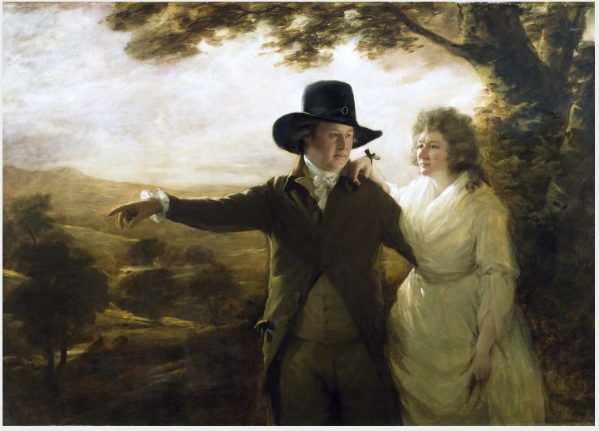
- Portrait of Sir John and Lady Clerk of Penicuik by Henry Raeburn
- Born: 1736; Midlothian
- Died: 24 February 1798 (aged 61–62)
- Resting place: Penicuik,St Kentigern's Church & Clerk Mausoleum
- Spouse(s): Rosemary Appleby
- Parent(s): George Clerk-Maxwell; Dorothea Clerk-Maxwell
- Family: James Clerk

Sir John Clerk of Pennycuik, 5th Baronet FRSE (1736–1798) was a Royal Navy officer. Active in the Philosophical Society of Edinburgh, he thereby became a founder fellow of the Royal Society of Edinburgh upon its formation in 1783.

== Life ==
He was born in Midlothian the son of Sir George Clerk-Maxwell (1715–84) and his wife, Dorothea. John became a baronet upon the death of his father in 1784.

He became Director of the Highland Society in 1785.

He died on 24 February 1798 and is buried with his wife, Rosemary Dacre Appleby in Penicuik churchyard. They had no children and the baronetcy passed to his nephew George.

== Artistic recognition ==
A famous portrait of Sir John and Lady Clerk, by Sir Henry Raeburn, is held by the National Gallery of Ireland.

Baronetage of Nova Scotia
Preceded by George Clerk-Maxwell	Baronet (of Pennycuik); 1784–1798	Succeeded by George Clerk
