= Sir John Clerk, 2nd Baronet =

Scottish politician, judge, and writer

Sir John Clerk Bt
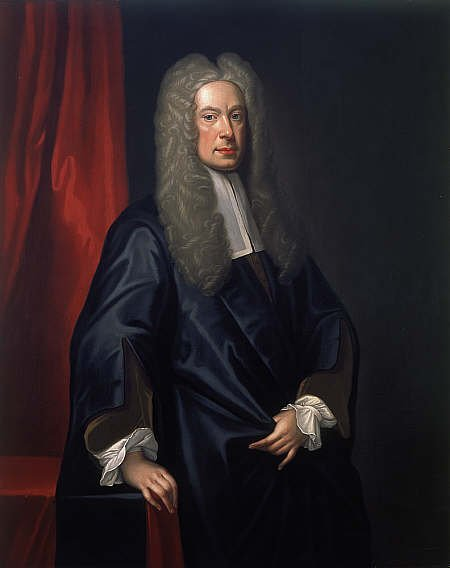
- John Clerk of Pennycuik, 2nd Baronet by William Aikman, (circa 1725)

Member of Parliament for Scotland
- In office 1 May 1707 – 3 April 1708 Serving with numerous others

Commissioner for Whithorn
- In office 1702–1707

Personal details
- Born: 1676
- Died: 4 October 1755 (aged 79) Penicuik House, Midlothian
- Party: Whigs
- Children: George Clerk Maxwell; John Clerk of Eldin
- Parent(s): Sir John Clerk, 1st Baronet; Elizabeth Henderson
- Education: University of Glasgow; Leiden University
- Profession: Judge, Lawyer, Politician

Sir John Clerk, 2nd Baronet (c. 1676 – 4 October 1755) was a Scottish politician, lawyer, judge and composer. He was vice-president of the Philosophical Society of Edinburgh, the pre-eminent learned society of the Scottish Enlightenment. Clerk was also the father of George Clerk-Maxwell and John Clerk of Eldin, and the great-great-grandfather of the famous physicist James Clerk Maxwell.

== Early life ==
John Clerk was son of Sir John Clerk, 1st Baronet by his first wife Elizabeth, daughter of Henry Henderson of Elvington. He had a legal education first at University of Glasgow and then at Leiden University. During 1697 and 1698 he went on a Grand Tour. In 1699 he composed a cantata entitled Leo Scotiae Irratus (The Scottish Lion Angered), with Latin lyrics by his Dutch friend Herman Boerhaave, to celebrate the establishment of the Scottish trading colony at Darien by the Company of Scotland. In 1700 was admitted to the Scottish Bar.

Between 1700 and 1730 he planted 300,000 trees on the grounds of the family estate at Penicuik House.

== Parliament ==
He was a member of the Parliament of Scotland for Whithorn from 1702 to 1707, and a commissioner for the Union of Parliaments for the Whig Party: he sat in the first Parliament of Great Britain in 1707.

He was appointed a Baron of the Exchequer for Scotland on the constitution of the Exchequer Court, 13 May 1708, a position he held for nearly half a century. With Baron Scrope, in 1726, he drew up an Historical View of the Forms and Powers of the Court of Exchequer in Scotland, which was printed at the expense of the Barons of Exchequer for private circulation.

A leading supporter of the Act of Union 1707 with the Kingdom of England, Clerk wrote in his memoirs of English novelist, journalist and secret agent Daniel Defoe that it was not known at the time that Defoe had been sent by Godolphin : "... to give a faithful account to him from time to time how everything past here. He was therefor a spy among us, but not known to be such, otherways the Mob of Edin. had pull him to pieces". (Note: In a side-note at this point Clerk recommends Defoe's History of the Union of Great Britain : "This History of the Union deserves to be read. It was published in folio. There is not one fact in it which I can challenge")

== Antiquarian leanings ==
Of his other treatises, Clerk wrote papers in the Philosophical Transactions: one an Account of the Stylus of the Ancients and their different sorts of Paper, printed in 1731, and the others On the effects of Thunder on Trees and Of a large Deer's Horns found in the heart of an Oak, printed in 1739. He was the author of a tract entitled Dissertatio de quibusdam Monumentis Romanis &c, written in 1730 but not published until 1750. For upwards of twenty years he also carried on a learned correspondence with Roger Gale, the English antiquary, which forms a portion of the Reliquiae Britannica of 1782.

== Patron of the arts ==
Sir John Clerk was one of the friends and patrons of the poet Allan Ramsay who, during his latter years, spent much of his time at Penicuik House. His son, Sir James Clerk, erected at the family seat an obelisk to Ramsay's memory. Sir John was a patron to various other artists and architects, and even dabbled in architecture himself.

== Musical talent ==
Clerk had a musical bent also, and while in Rome may have been tutored by the Baroque composer Arcangelo Corelli, but his own work has often been overlooked, primarily since the only record of his composition seems to be his own papers. One of his humorous songs was O merry may the maid be that marries the miller.

== Family ==
Sir John succeeded his father in his title and estates in 1722. He unsuccessfully courted Susanna, daughter of Sir Archibald Kennedy of Culzean, Baronet (ancestor of the Marquess of Ailsa) and that correspondence is in the National Archives. She became the third wife of Alexander, 9th Earl of Eglinton.

He married, firstly, on 23 February 1701, Lady Margaret Stewart, eldest daughter of Alexander Stewart, 3rd Earl of Galloway who died in childbirth on 26 December that year. Her son, John, survived, but died unmarried in 1722. Sir John married again, to Janet Inglis, daughter of Sir James Inglis of Cramond, 1st Bt., by whom he had seven sons and six daughters. He died at Penicuik House on 4 October 1755.

== Notes ==
Footnotes

Citations

Parliament of Scotland
Preceded by Patrick Murdoch	Burgh Commissioner for Whithorn; 1702–1707	Succeeded by Parliament of Great Britain
Parliament of Great Britain
Preceded by Parliament of Scotland	Member of Parliament for Scotland; 1707–1708; With: 44 others	Succeeded by William Cochrane (as MP for Wigtown Burghs)
Baronetage of Nova Scotia
Preceded by John Clerk	Baronet (of Pennycuik); 1722–1755	Succeeded by James Clerk
