= Gabrielle Clerk =

Canadian psychoanalyst

- Born: Gabrielle Brunet; 30 June 1923
- Died: 18 December 2012 (aged 89); Cowansville, Quebec, Canada
- Education: Université de Montréal (Ph.D.)
- Occupations: Psychoanalyst and psychologist, professor
- Employer: Université de Montréal
- Title: Professor emeritus
- Spouse: Marc Clerk

Gabrielle "Gaby" Clerk (born Gabrielle Brunet; 30 June 1923 – 18 December 2012) was a Canadian psychologist and professor of psychology at the Université de Montréal. She was one of the first psychoanalysts in Canada.

== Biography ==
In 1940, Gabrielle Brunet enrolled at the Université de Montréal's Institute of Psychology, which had just been founded by Father Noël Mailloux. She was part of the first class of six students along with André Lussier and Thérèse Gouin-Décarie.

After obtaining a licence in psychology in 1948 from the Faculty of Philosophy at the Université de Montréal, she was entrusted with teaching duties as a part-time associate professor at the Department of Psychology.

In 1953, she obtained her doctorate and became the first holder of clinical psychoanalytical credentials in the Department of Psychology. She was at the origin of the department's consultation service, establishment of internships and supervising master's and Ph.D. students.

Clerk gained a specialization in psychoanalysis of adults and children and became a full-time professor in 1960. She was the first woman of French-Canadian and Quebec descent to graduate from the Canadian Institute of Psychoanalysis in 1968. She consulted at Montreal Children's Hospital and participated on many provincial and national committees and commissions.

She died in Cowansville, Quebec, aged 89.

== Awards and honours ==
Her exceptional academic qualities were recognized in 1987 by obtaining the status of professor emeritus and obtaining the annual Merit of the Order of Psychologists.

== Bibliography ==
- Clerk, Gabrielle (1953). De la validité de la méthode de projection Rorschach comme moyen de pronostic psychothérapeutique [The validity of the Rorschach projection method as a means of psychotherapeutic prognosis] (Thesis) (in French). University of Montreal.
- Clerk, Gabrielle (1977). "Object Relations and Attachment". Contemporary Psychoanalysis. 13 (4): 469–482. doi:10.1080/00107530.1977.10745510.
- Clerk, Gabrielle (1980). "Le couple parental et le développement psycho-sexuel de l'enfant". L'enfant, Exploration récentes en psychologie du développement (in French). University of Montreal Press. pp. 99–118.
- Clerk, Gabrielle (1994). "La féminisation de la psychologie". Enjeux Scientifiques et Professionnels (in French). 15 (1). RQP: 27–53.
- Clerk, Gabrielle (1995). "Psychanalyse et vieillesse". Canadian Journal of Psychoanalysis (in French). 3: 71–86.
- Clerk, Gabrielle (2000). "Cinquante ans (1945–1995) de pratique analytique avec des enfants". Réflexions et questionnements (in French). 9 (2). Filigrane.
- Clerk, Gabrielle (2001). "Psychanalyse de l'enfant et de l'adolescent à la Société canadienne de psychanalyse: Historique, questions, réflexions". Filigrane (in French). 10 (1).
