= Douglas Mercer-Henderson =

British Army officer

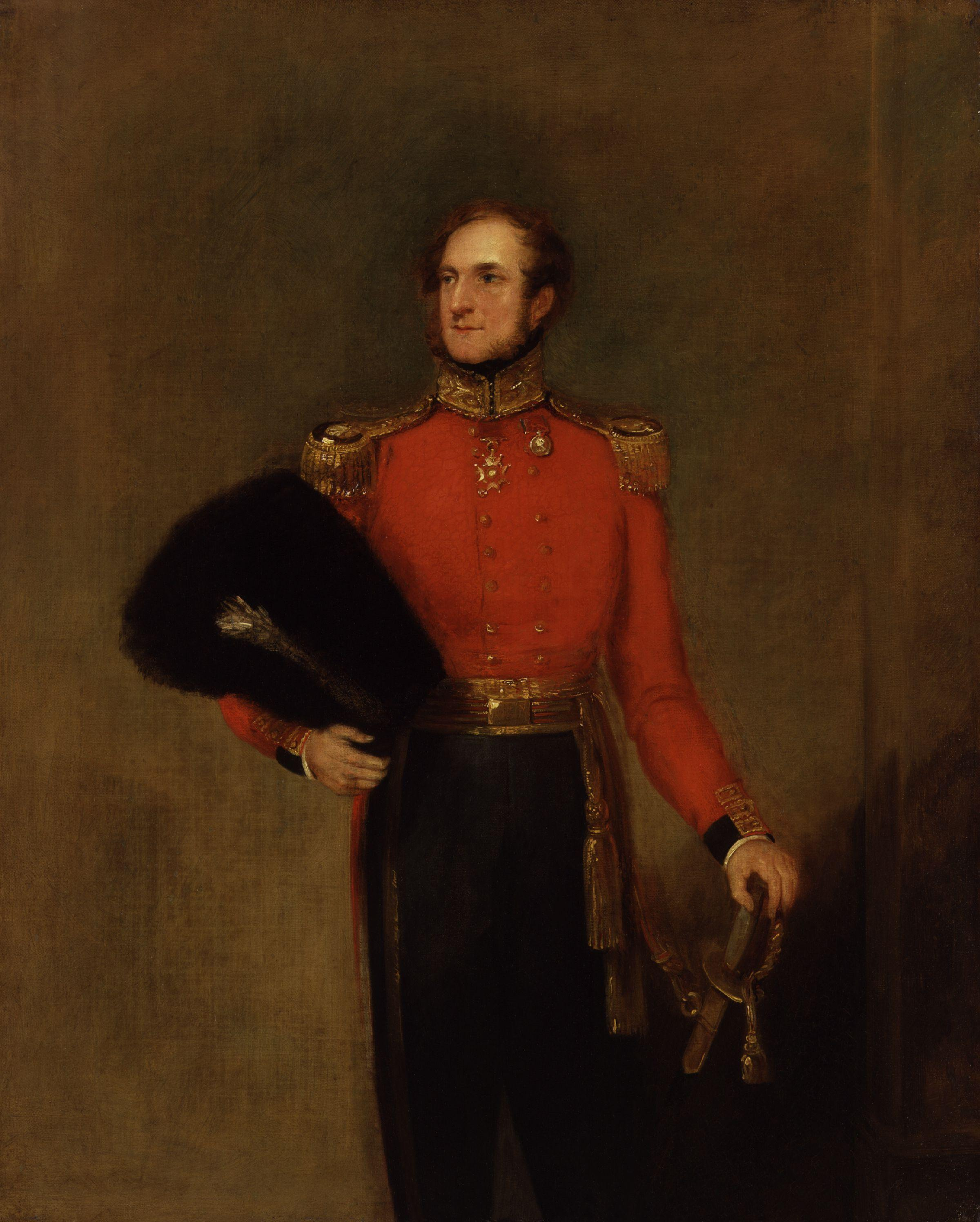
Douglas Mercer (afterwards Henderson Mercer), by William Salter

Colonel Douglas Mercer-Henderson CB (1786 – 21 March 1854) was a British Army officer who fought during the Peninsular War and Waterloo Campaign, later inheriting a castle in Scotland.

== Life ==
He was born Douglas Mercer, the third son of Lieutenant-colonel George Mercer (d. Paris, 1822), by Jean (d. 1814), eldest daughter of Sir Robert Henderson Bt. of the Clan Henderson.

Mercer was appointed an ensign in the 3rd Foot Guards on 24 March 1803 and two years later took part in the expedition to Hanover under Lord Cathcart. Promoted to Lieutenant in 1806, he took part in the 1809 Walcheren Campaign and the following Spring was appointed aide-de-camp (ADC) to Major-general Dilkes, who he accompanied to Cádiz.

In the Autumn of 1810, he went to Portugal and joined the army of Viscount Wellington following the Battle of Bussaco. After travelling to the Lines of Torres Vedras as ADC to Sir Brent Spencer, he was wounded by a gunshot and returned to Lisbon. The following Spring he was again wounded at the Battle of Barrosa.

After a month in England he returned to Portugal and was present at the Battle of El Bodón (1811), the sieges of Ciudad Rodrigo and Badajoz (1812), the battle of Salamanca (1812), the Siege of Burgos (1812) and subsequent withdrawal as well as the battles of Nivelle and the Biddassoa (1813).

He subsequently served in Flanders and was present at the battles of Quatre Bras and Waterloo, commanding the 3rd Foot Guards in the closing stages of the latter action in the defence of Hougoumont. He later accompanied the army to Paris.

For his military service he received the Waterloo Medal and the Army Gold Medal with five clasps.

He was gazetted colonel of the 68th Regiment of Foot on 8 February 1850.

In 1852, he inherited Fordell Castle, Fife, Scotland, on the death of his elder brother Robert. By royal licence dated 14 January 1853, Mercer and his issue were authorised to take the surname of Henderson in addition to and after that of Mercer, and to bear the arms of Henderson quarterly with those of Mercer.

He died at Palazza Valle Chiaja, near Naples on 21 March 1854 and is buried in the city's Protestant Cemetery.

== Family ==
On 2 November 1820 he married Susan-Arabella, second daughter of Sir William Rowley, Bt. of Tendring Hall, Stoke-by-Nayland, Suffolk. The couple had the following issue:

- George William Mercer-Henderson (1823-1881), who inherited Fordell Castle and became a captain in the Scots Fusilier Guards.
- Douglas Mercer
- Robert-Philip Mercer-Henderson (d. 10 March 1855), a lieutenant in the Royal Navy, never married.
- Jane, who on 26 June 1851 married James Clerk, son of Sir George Clerk, Bt.
- Edith

Susan died in London on 5 March 1862.
