= Nicholas Clerk (politician) =

English politician

Nicholas Clerk (fl. 1407) was an English politician. Clerk has not been clearly identified. He was a member (MP) of the parliament of England for Exeter in 1407.
