= George Clerk-Maxwell =

Scottish landowner

Sir George Clerk Maxwell, 4th Baronet FRSE (1715–1784), of Penicuik (simply Clerk prior to his marriage), was a Scottish landowner who served as the Lord Treasurer's Remembrancer in Exchequer (1741), Commissioner of Customs (1763), a Trustee for Improving Fisheries and Manufactures in Scotland, and as a Commissioner for the Annexed Forfeited Estates.

== Life ==
George Clerk was born in Edinburgh on 31 October 1715, the second son of Sir John Clerk, 2nd Baronet of Penicuik, and Janet Inglis, daughter of Sir John Inglis, 2nd Baronet of Cramond. He was educated at the universities of Edinburgh and Leyden. From his father he received in patrimony the lands of Drumcrieff in Annandale, and by marriage with his cousin Dorothea Clerk Maxwell, daughter of his uncle William by Agnes Maxwell, heiress of Middlebie, Dumfriesshire, he obtained the lands of Middlebie, adopting thereupon his wife's name, Clerk Maxwell.

He was a commissioner of the customs, king's remembrancer in the exchequer, and one of the trustees for improving fisheries and manufactures in Scotland. Both in his private and public capacity he promoted the agricultural and commercial interests of the country. At Dumfries he erected at considerable expense a linen manufactory, and he set on foot a variety of projects for the mining of lead and copper in the county. In 1755 he addressed two letters to the trustees for the improvement of the fisheries and manufactures of Scotland, regarding the common mode of treating wool, which were published by direction of the board in 1756. He was also the author of a paper on shallow ploughing, read before the members of the Philosophical Society, and published in the third volume of their essays. He was a remarkably clever draughtsman, and etched a variety of views of Scotland. On the death of his elder brother in 1782, he succeeded to the baronetcy and estates of Penicuik.

In 1783 he was one of the joint founders of the Royal Society of Edinburgh.

He died 29 January 1784.

George's father, his brother John and himself were friends of James Hutton.

== Family ==
He married Dorothea Clerk Maxwell of Middlebie.

He was succeeded in the baronetcy by his eldest son John Clerk. He had four other sons and four daughters.

He was the great-grandfather of the famous physicist James Clerk Maxwell.

Baronetage of Nova Scotia
Preceded by James Clerk	Baronet (of Penicuik); 1782–1784	Succeeded by John Clerk
