= Clark (disambiguation) =

Clark is an English-language surname.

Clark may also refer to:

== Places ==
=== United States ===
- Clark, Colorado
- Clark, Missouri
- Clark, Nevada
- Clark, New Jersey
- Clark, Pennsylvania
- Clark, South Dakota
- Clark, Texas, former name of DISH, Texas
- Clark, Washington
- Clark, West Virginia
- Clark, Wisconsin
- Clark County (disambiguation)
- Clark Creek (disambiguation)
- Clark Point, point in eastern Virginia by the Chesapeake Bay
- Clark Township (disambiguation)

=== Elsewhere ===
- Metro Clark, an area in the Philippines
  - Clark Freeport and Special Economic Zone
  - Clark Global City, Clark Freeport Zone
  - New Clark City, Clark Special Economic Zone
- Clark Seamount, a submarine volcano north of New Zealand
- Clark Mountains, Antarctica
- Division of Clark, an electorate in Tasmania, Australia

=== Extra-terrestrial ===
- Clark (lunar crater), a crater on the Moon
- Clark (Martian crater), a crater on Mars

== Education ==
- Clark Atlanta University, in Atlanta, Georgia, USA
- Clark College, a community college in Vancouver, Washington, USA
- Clark High School (disambiguation)
- Clark University, in Worcester, Massachusetts, USA

== Music ==
- Clark (musician), a British electronic musician, performing under the mononym Clark
- Clark (album), by English musician Chris Clark
- "Clark", a song from the album Minecraft – Volume Alpha by C418

== Organisations and companies ==
- Clark Art Institute or The Clark
- Clark Boat Company, a former U.S. boat building company
- Clark Brands, a 20th-century gas station chain
- Clark Construction, an engineering and construction firm
- Clark Equipment Company, a former maker of construction equipment
- Clark Material Handling Company, stylised as CLARK

== Other uses ==
- Clark (given name), people with the given name
- Clark (mascot), the mascot of the Chicago Cubs baseball team
- Clark (TV series), a 2022 Swedish TV series
- Clark Bar, a candy bar
- Clark Bridge, a bridge over the Mississippi River between Missouri and Illinois
- Clark International Airport, Pampanga, Philippines

== See also ==
- Clark Center (disambiguation)
- Clarke
- Clark's rule
- Clarks (disambiguation)
- Clarksburg (disambiguation)
- Clarkson (disambiguation)
- Clarkston (disambiguation)
- Clarksville (disambiguation)
- Clerk (disambiguation)
- Clerke (disambiguation)
- Mount Clark (disambiguation)
- Kimberly-Clark, a U.S. producer of paper-based consumer products
