= Clarks =

Clarks may refer to:

== Places ==
- Clarks, Louisiana, U.S.
- Clarks, Nebraska, U.S.

== Businesses ==
- Clarks (shoe retailer), British shoe manufacturer
- Clarks, a natural products brand of Hain Celestial Group

== Music ==
- The Clarks, a rock band from Pittsburgh, Pennsylvania

== See also ==
- Clark (disambiguation)
- Clark's rule
- Clarks Hill, Indiana
- Clarks Hill, South Carolina
- Clarks Green, Pennsylvania
- Clarks Grove, Minnesota
- Clark's Island, Massachusetts
- Clarks Summit, Pennsylvania
- Clarks Mills, Wisconsin, an unincorporated community
- Clarks Point, Wisconsin, an unincorporated community
- Clarks Summit, Pennsylvania
  - Clarks Summit University, located in Clarks Summit, Pennsylvania
- Clarksburg (disambiguation)
- Clarkson (disambiguation)
- Clarkston (disambiguation)
- Clarksville (disambiguation)
