= Clarkson (surname) =

- Gender: Unisex
- Language: English

Origin
- Language: Old English
- Origin: clerc, clerec
- Meaning: "priest"

Other names
- Variant form: Clarson

Clarkson is a common English surname.

== Etymology ==
It is derived from a patronymic form of an occupational name. The surname means "son of the clerk", and refers to a scribe or secretary. The surname is derived from the Old English clerc, clerec, which means priest; the Old English words were later reinforced by the Old French form of the word clerc. Both the Old English and Old French words are from the Late Latin clericus, which is derived from the Greek klerikos, which is in turn a derivative of kleros, which means "inheritance", "legacy".

An early instances of the surname in English records is "le Clerkissone", in 1308; "Clerksone", in 1332; and "Clarkson", in 1491.

== Persons with the surname ==
- Adrienne Clarkson (born 1939), Governor General of Canada
- Alastair Clarkson (born 1968), Australian football player and coach
- A. E. Clarkson (Albert Ernest Clarkson 1876–1936), South Australian businessman
- Alison Clarkson, stage name Betty Boo, British singer, songwriter and rapper
- Alison H. Clarkson (born 1955), American politician
- Amelia Clarkson (born 1997), English actress
- Bayard D. Clarkson (1926–2025), American physician, hematologist and oncologist
- Bob Clarkson (born 1939), New Zealand politician
- Charles Francis Clarkson (1881–1959), South African politician
- Coker F. Clarkson (1811–1890), American politician and journalist from Iowa
- Coker Fifield Clarkson (1870–1930), American automotive lawyer and editor
- Courtney Clarkson (born 1991), Australian football player
- David Clarkson (disambiguation)
- Ellis Clarkson (1887—1947) English rugby player
- Grosvenor Clarkson (1882–1937), American government official from Iowa
- James Clarkson (disambiguation), multiple people
- Jeremy Clarkson (born 1960), English motoring journalist
- John Clarkson (1861–1909), American baseball player
- John Clarkson (abolitionist) (1764–1828) British Royal Navy officer and founder of Freetown, Sierra Leone
- Jordan Clarkson (born 1992), Filipino-American basketball player
- Julian Clarkson, English baritone
- Kelly Clarkson (born 1982), singer/songwriter
- Kenneth L. Clarkson, American computer scientist
- Kevin Clarkson, Attorney General of Alaska
- Lana Clarkson (1962–2003), American actress and murder victim
- Margaret Clarkson (born 1941), English artist
- Nathaniel James Clarkson (born 1978), British record producer, aka Nat Clarxon & NJC
- Patricia Clarkson (born 1959), American actress
- Percy W. Clarkson (1893-1962), American major general
- Phil Clarkson, English footballer
- Robert Clarkson, American tax protester
- Ross W. Clarkson (born 1963, Australian cinematographer and film director
- Stephen Clarkson (1937–2016), Canadian political scientist
- Stu Clarkson (1919–1957), American football player
- Thomas Clarkson (1760–1846), British abolitionist
- Tony Clarkson (cricketer) (born 1939), English cricketer
- Walter Clarkson (1878–1946), American baseball player
- William Clarkson (disambiguation)

== Fictional characters ==
- Tom Clarkson, from the British television drama Waterloo Road
- Louise Clarkson, from the American television series Everybody Hates Chris
- Myles Clarkson, from the 1971 American horror film The Mephisto Waltz
