= Clarke (disambiguation) =

Clarke is an Irish surname.

Clarke may also refer to:

== Places ==
- 4923 Clarke, an asteroid named for Sir Arthur C. Clarke
- Clarke City, Quebec, Canada
- Clarke City, the former name of Greenfield, California
- Clarke County (disambiguation)
- Clarke Glacier (disambiguation), three glaciers in Antarctica
- Clarke Island (Tasmania), Australia
- Clarke Quay, Singapore, an historical riverside quay
- Clarke Range, mountain range in Queensland, Australia
- Clarke River (disambiguation), various rivers
- Clarke Sound, Nunavut, Canada
- Clarke's Beach, a town in Newfoundland and Labrador, Canada
- Clarke's Gap, a mountain pass west of Leesburg, Virginia
- Lake Clarke, a reservoir in Pennsylvania

== Schools ==
- Clarke College, a Baptist institution which merged into Mississippi College
- Clarke School for the Deaf, in Northampton, Massachusetts
- Clarke University, a Roman Catholic institution in Dubuque, Iowa

== Other uses ==
- Clarke, a 2022 Australian crime novel by Holly Throsby
- Clarke (given name)
- Clarke baronets, in the Baronetage of England or the Baronetage of the United Kingdom
- Clarke Energy, a privately owned multinational company specialising in power plants utilising gas engines
- Clarke Historical Museum, in Eureka, California, USA
- Clarke Medal, an Australian medal for distinguished work in the Natural sciences
- Clarke Stadium, Edmonton, Alberta, Canada
- Clarke's Bookshop, an independent bookstore in Cape Town, South Africa
- HP Clarke, a CPU in certain Hewlett-Packard programmable calculators

== See also ==
- Clarke House (disambiguation), various buildings on the National Register of Historic Places
- Clarkesville
- Clarksville (disambiguation)
- Justice Clarke (disambiguation)
