= Clerke =

Clerke may refer to:

- Clerke (surname)
- .38/.45 Clerke, a wildcat semi-automatic pistol cartridge
- Clerke (crater), a lunar crater named after Agnes Mary Clerke
- Clerke Rocks, a group of small rocky islands in the South Atlantic, named after Charles Clerke
- Clerke v. Harwood (1797), a United States Supreme Court case concerning debts owed to British subjects

== See also ==
- Clark (disambiguation)
- Clarke (disambiguation)
- Clerk (disambiguation)
