= Coker F. Clarkson =

American politician and journalist (1811–1890)

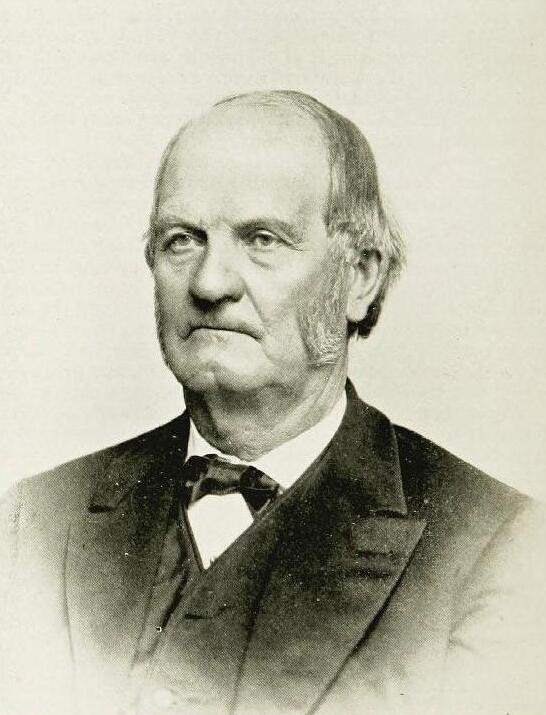
- Clarkson in an 1895 publication

Member of the Iowa Senate from the 39th district
- In office 1864–1868

Personal details
- Born: Coker Fifield Clarkson; January 21, 1811 Dixmont, Maine, U.S.
- Died: May 7, 1890 (aged 79) Des Moines, Iowa, U.S.
- Party: Whig; Republican
- Spouses: Elizabeth Goudie (m. 1832; died 1848) Elizabeth Colescott (m. 1849)
- Children: 8, including James
- Relatives: Coker Fifield Clarkson (grandson); Grosvenor Clarkson (grandson)
- Occupation: Politician; journalist; farmer
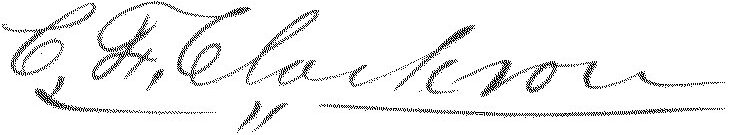
- Signature
- Nickname: Father Clarkson

Coker Fifield Clarkson (January 21, 1811 – May 7, 1890), sometimes known by the nickname "Father Clarkson", was an American politician, farmer, and agricultural journalist from Indiana and Iowa. He was active in Whig and Republican politics throughout his life. He served one term in the Iowa Senate and wrote agricultural columns for the Iowa State Register.

== Early life ==
Coker Fifield Clarkson was born on January 21, 1811, in Dixmont, Maine, to Mary (née Simpson) and Richard Perkinhon Clarkson. His grandfather was a lieutenant colonel of the British Army in the Revolutionary War. His maternal grandfather was an officer in the Continental Army and was descended from the Puritans. The family were descended from English abolitionist Thomas Clarkson. Clarkson was named after a New Hampshire farmer named Coker Fifield. During the War of 1812, a cannonball from a British man-of-war was shot into the family's home and under Clarkson's bed. At the age of nine, Clarkson worked on a farm for US$5 a month. The family lived next to Clarkson Hill on the banks of the Penobscot River in Maine. Within the next year, the family moved to Franklin County, Indiana. The family started a farm. Clarkson worked for US$6 a month on the Miami Canal from 1825 to 1826.

== Career ==
On September 21, 1828, Clarkson left the family farm and apprenticed in the printing trade at Lawrenceburg Western Statesman in Lawrenceburg, Indiana, under Milton Gregg. He became editor of the paper in 1829 and he bought the paper in March 1832. While in Lawrenceburg, he was friends with pastor Henry Ward Beecher. He sold the Western Statesman and returned to Franklin County and bought the Brookville Inquirer of Brookville in July 1833. He renamed the paper the Indiana American (or the Brookville American). He published the paper until 1854 or 1858, sources differ, when he sold it to Thomas A. Goodwin. He was then associated with a railroad in the 1850s. The family also farmed.

Clarkson was active with the Whig Party. He was a regional campaign manager for Henry Clay in 1832 and later helped in the presidential campaign of William Henry Harrison in Indiana in 1835. He was an Indiana delegate at the 1839 Whig National Convention. In 1853 or 1855, he sold his weekly newspaper. He then moved his family to Melrose Township, Grundy County, Iowa, and the family established the Melrose Farm. Clarkson conducted agricultural experiments and wrote about farming. He also became involved in the Underground Railroad and the Melrose Farm was a station on the railroad. He was also involved in organizing Grundy County and establishing free school systems there and in adjoining counties.

Clarkson remained active with the Whigs in Iowa and then turned to the Republican Party. In 1856, he was a delegate of Grundy County to a district convention. He was nominated as a delegate to the Iowa constitutional convention, but Clarkson declined since he was new to the state. He served as supervisor of Grundy County. He was a director of the Cedar Valley Agricultural and Manufacturing Association in 1857. He was a delegate-at-large to the 1860 Republican National Convention and was a member of its committee on credentials. He supported Abraham Lincoln in the second or third ballot, sources differ, at the convention. He declined two postings during the Lincoln administration. In 1862 or 1863, he assisted General Ulysses S. Grant and the Army of the Mississippi on a "secret mission" to the Pacific. Presidents Grant and James Garfield would offer him the role of commissioner of agriculture, but he declined both offers. In 1863, he was elected to the Iowa Senate, representing the 39th district (Hardin, Grundy, Black Hawk, and Franklin counties). He served as chairman of the senate's agriculture committee. While senator, he helped found the State Agricultural College. He was a regent at the Iowa State University. In 1868, he was a candidate for Iowa's 6th district of the U.S. Congress.

Clarkson and his sons Richard and James purchased the Iowa State Register in 1870. He owned one third of the paper and wrote about agricultural topics for the paper. In 1871, the Clarksons expanded the paper's scope. Clarkson started a weekly column in 1871 entitled "Farm, Orchard and Garden". Following his support for James Harlan and his sons support of William B. Allison in the 1871 U.S. senate race, Clarkson sold his portion of the paper in December 1871. In 1871, he was appointed as commissioner of the United States Centennial Commission. In 1876, he was an alternate commissioner of the Centennial Exposition and was a member of its committee on horticulture and floriculture.

In 1878, Clarkson sold the Melrose Farm and moved to Des Moines. He then became involved in The Grange and continued to write his column until his death. In 1888, he was an organizer of the Tippecanoe Club in Des Moines and served as its first treasurer. He was known as "Father Clarkson" in the agricultural community. In the dispute between farmers and the Washburn Barb Wire Trust, he helped organize the Farmers' Protective Association with Seaman A. Knapp, James Wilson, and Henry Cantwell Wallace. He was also an organizer of the Agricultural Editors' Association with Knapp, Wilson, and Wallace. In 1888, he would support Benjamin Harrison for president.

== Personal life ==
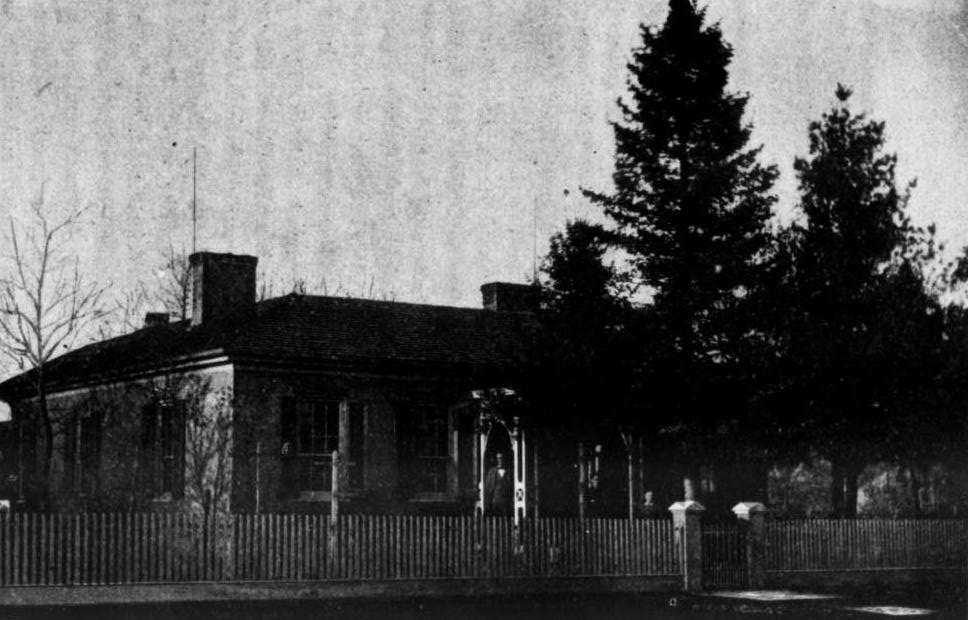
Home of the Clarksons in Brookville, Indiana

Clarkson married Elizabeth Goudie on April 2, 1832. She was from Uniontown, Pennsylvania, and the daughter of Indiana politician James B. Goudie Jr. They had four children, Pamela B., Frances, Richard "Dick" Perkinhon, and James "Jimmie" S. His wife died in 1848. He married Elizabeth Colescott of Brookville, Indiana, in 1849. They had one child who died as a baby. In total, he had eight children, but only four survived him. His grandson was Grosvenor Clarkson, director of the Council of National Defense. Another grandson Coker Fifield Clarkson was a lawyer and general manager of the Society of Automotive Engineers. The family lived in Brookville. The home of the family in Grundy County, Iowa, was known as Clarkson's Gothic House. In Herbert Quick's autobiography, Quick notes the family called Clarkson either "Senator Clarkson" or "Governor Clarkson", claiming that Clarkson may have run for governor at some point.

Clarkson was personal friends of William Henry Harrison, who visited the family in Brookville. He was also friends with Schuyler Colfax and Indiana governor David Wallace. In 1830, he took up the Methodist faith and remained a Methodist until the end of his life. He was friends with bishop Matthew Simpson. He was an advocate for temperance and was abstinent. He was friends with temperance leaders Edward C. Delavan and Neal Dow.

Clarkson died on May 7, 1890, in Des Moines. His funeral was held at the First Methodist Church in Des Moines.

== Legacy ==
In Herbert Quick's The Hawkeye, Clarkson was the influence for the anti-monopolist character Governor Wade.
