= David Clarkson =

David Clarkson may refer to:

- David Clarkson (Scottish footballer) (born 1985)
- David Clarkson (minister) (1622–1686), English Puritan
- David Clarkson (ice hockey) (born 1984), Canadian hockey forward
- David Augustus Clarkson (1793–1850), Hudson River valley landowner
- David Clarkson (banker) (1795–1867), president of the New York Stock Exchange
- David Clarkson (Australian soccer) (born 1968), soccer player

== See also ==
- Clarkson (disambiguation)
- Clarkson (surname)
