= James Goudie =

James Goudie may refer to:

- James B. Goudie Jr. (1769–1836), Indiana politician
- James Goudie (draughtsman), Scottish-born designer of the SS Royal William amongst others
