= William Clarkson (disambiguation) =

William Clarkson (1859–1934) was a co-founder and Admiral of the Royal Australian Navy

William Clarkson, Willy Clarkson, Bill Clarkson or Billy Clarkson may also refer to:

- Willy Clarkson (1861–1934), theatrical costume designer and wigmaker
- Billy Clarkson (1891–1954), English professional footballer
- William Clarkson (cricketer), 1920s Warwickshire cricketer
- William Clarkson (missionary), 19th-century Irish missionary
- William Herbert Clarkson (1872–?), artist
- Bill Clarkson (1898–1971), pitcher in Major League Baseball

== See also ==
- Clarkson (disambiguation)
- Clarkson (surname)
