= Frederic Atwood Besley =

American surgeon (1868–1944)

Frederic A. Besley
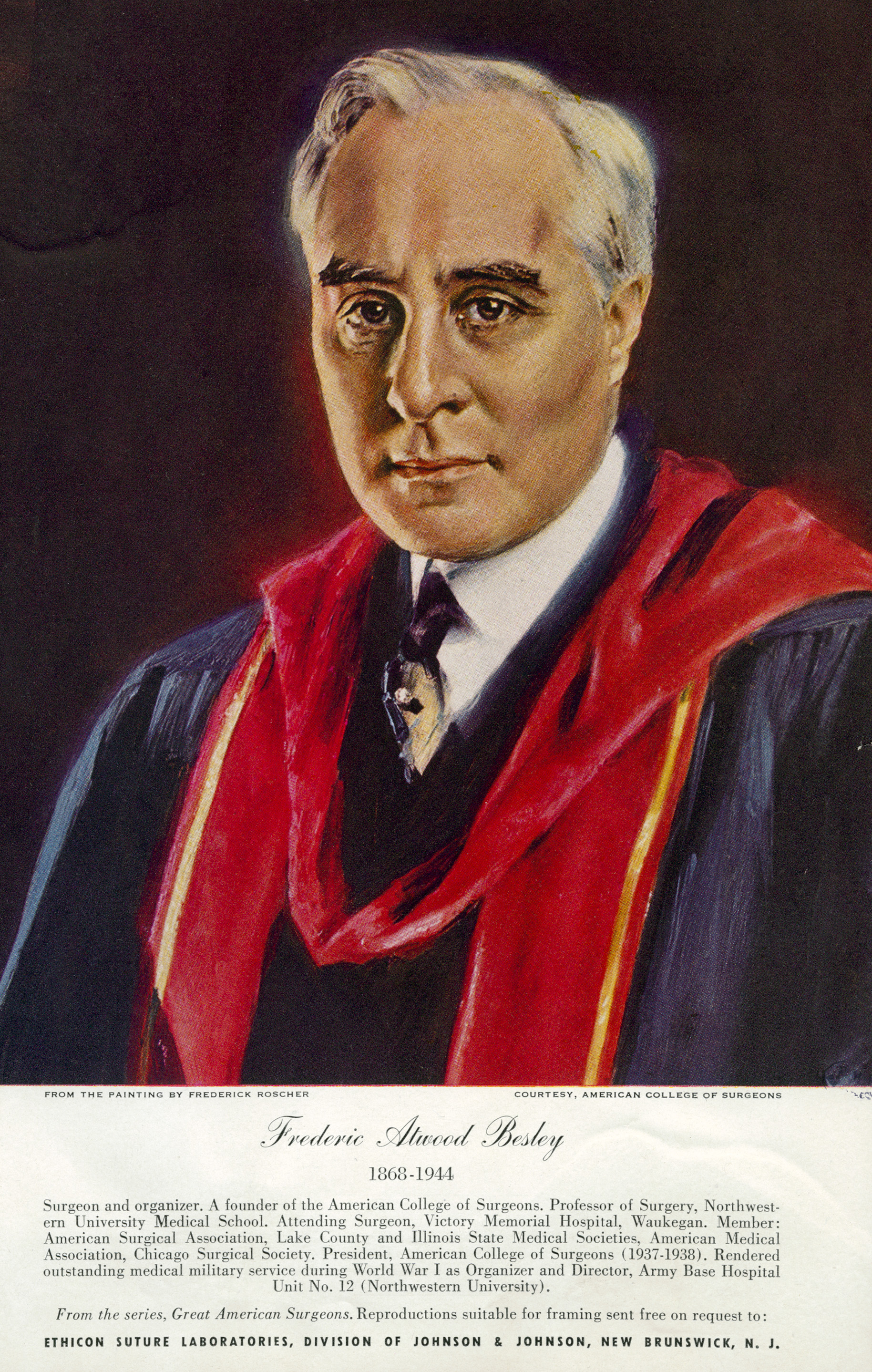
- Besley Photo (1944)
- Born: April 19, 1868; Waukegan, Illinois
- Died: August 16, 1944 (aged 76); Illinois
- Burial place: Northshore Garden of Memories North Chicago, Lake County, Illinois, USA
- Education: Northwestern University Medical School (MD)
- Occupations: Army, medical doctor, surgeon
- Organization(s): American Board of Surgery and American College of Surgeons
- Notable work: American College of Surgeons, Surgery Gynecology and Obstetrics, American Board of Surgery
- Title: President of the American College of Surgeons; Secretary of the American Board of Surgery
- Term: (1937–1938) (1938–1939)
- Parents: William Besley (father); Sylvia Jocelyn (mother)
- Military career
- Allegiance: United States
- Branch: United States Army
- Service years: 1910–1938
- Rank: Colonel

Frederic Atwood Besley FACS (April 19, 1868 – August 16, 1944) was an American military medical doctor and surgeon during World War I. He founded the American College of Surgeons, Surgery Gynecology and Obstetrics and founding member of the American Board of Surgery.

== Background ==
Besley was born at Waukegan, Illinois, his parent were William Besley (father) and (mother) Sylvia Jocelyn.

He attended Chicago Manual Training School in 1880 and graduated from the Northwestern University Medical School in 1894 together with a colleague Franklin H. Martin.

== Medical career ==
Besley started with internship at Cook County Hospital and began his practice in Chicago, specializing in surgery. From 1900 to 1908 he began to work in the Postgraduate Medical School together in the Northwestern Medical School and in 1901 to 1902 he worked as a professor of surgery in the Women's Medical College of Northwestern University. He later became an instructor of surgery in 1904 at the Northwestern University and finally became an advanced professor of surgery, serving as a staff member and consultant of various hospitals in Chicago.

== American College of Surgery and Surgery, Gynecology and Obstetrics ==
Working with Franklin Martin, in 1905 together they founded and were editors of the journal Surgery, Gynecology and Obstetrics. Besley was the founder of the American Board of Surgery and the American College of Surgeons serving various positions in the board and the college of surgery.

He also chaired the American College of Surgeons in 1937 to 1938 as well as Secretary of American Board of Surgery in 1938 and was a founding member of the Industrial Medicine and Traumatic Surgery of the committee of American College of Surgery.

== Army medical career ==
Besley served in the army as a medical reserves firstly commissioned as major in the US Armed forces during World War I with the British and in the America where he worked as a chief surgeon of Northwestern University Base Hospital in France, he was a member of the Executive Committee of the General Medical Board for President Wilson's Council of National Defense and had also held key positions in the Association of Military Surgeons and Surgical Societies in Army. He retired as a colonel.

== Personal life ==
He married Myria Busey in 1910 to his death 1944.

== Citations ==
- "U.S., Find A Grave Index, 1600s-Current - Ancestry.co.uk". search.ancestry.co.uk.
- Cutter, I. S. (1945). "Northwestern University medical school- Frederic A. Besley". Quarterly Bulletin of the Northwestern University Medical School. 19 (1): 70–72. PMC 3802565.
- Cutter, Irving S. (1945). "An appreciation of Frederic Atwood Besley April 19, 1868-August 16, 1944". Quarterly Bulletin of the Northwestern University Medical School. 19 (1): 70–72. PMC 3802565.
- "Frederic Atwood Besley". npg.si.edu.
- "Obituaries". The Military Surgeon. 95 (4): 339–341. 1944-10-01. doi:10.1093/milmed/95.4.339. ISSN 0096-6827.
