= Clarksville =

Clarksville may refer to:

== Canada ==
- Clarksville, Alberta
- Clarksville, Nova Scotia

== United States ==
- Clarksville, Arkansas
- Clarksville, California
- Clarksville, Delaware
- Clarksville, Florida
- Clarksville, Idaho
- Clarksville, Illinois
- Clarksville, Indiana, in Clark County
- Clarksville, Hamilton County, Indiana
- Clarksville, Iowa
- Clarksville, Maryland
- Clarksville, Michigan
- Clarksville, Mississippi
- Clarksville, Missouri
- Clarksville Township, Merrick County, Nebraska
- Clarksville, New Hampshire
- Clarksville, New Jersey (disambiguation)
- Clarksville, New York (disambiguation)
- Clarksville, Ohio, in Clinton County
- Clarksville, Defiance County, Ohio
- Clarksville, Perry County, Ohio
- Clarksville, Oklahoma
- Clarksville, Pennsylvania
- Clarksville, Tennessee, the largest city with this name
- Clarksville, Texas
- Clarksville, Austin, Texas
- Clarksville, Virginia

== Other places ==
- Clarksville, New Zealand
- Clarksville metropolitan area, in Tennessee and Kentucky

== See also ==
- Clarkesville (disambiguation)
- Clarkville (disambiguation)
- Clarksville City, Texas
- Clarksville Elementary School (disambiguation)
- Clarksville High School (disambiguation)
- Clarksville Historic District (disambiguation)
- "Last Train to Clarksville", 1966 song by The Monkees
