= Nelson H. Henry =

American doctor and politician (1855–1923)

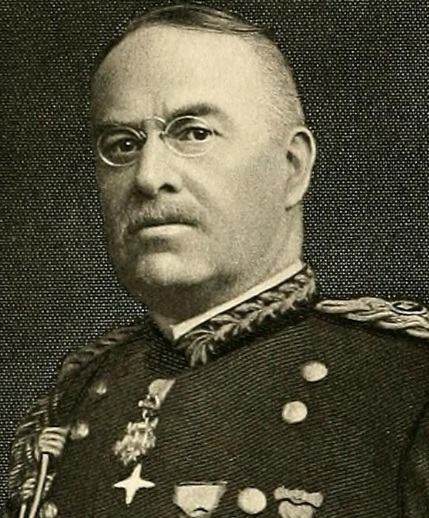
- From Volume IV of 1911's Official New York From Cleveland to Hughes

Surveyor of the Port of New York
- In office June 15, 1910 – June 13, 1914
- Nominated by: William Howard Taft
- Preceded by: James S. Clarkson
- Succeeded by: Thomas E. Rush

Member of the New York State Assembly
- In office January 1, 1899 – December 31, 1901
- Preceded by: William A. Chanler
- Succeeded by: Edward R. Finch
- Constituency: New York County 5th district

Personal details
- Born: April 27, 1855 Staten Island, New York, US
- Died: March 16, 1923 (aged 67) Manhattan, New York, US
- Resting place: Cemetery of the Evergreens, Brooklyn, New York, US
- Party: Republican
- Spouse: Sarah Bell (Rodgers) Sloane (m. 1901)
- Education: Columbia University College of Physicians and Surgeons
- Profession: Medical Doctor
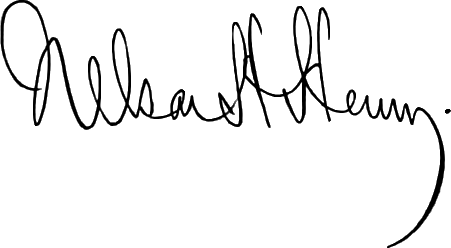
- Signature

Military service
- Allegiance: United States; New York
- Branch: U.S. Army Medical Corps
- Years of service: 1883–1895, 1897–1898, 1898–1910 (National Guard); 1898 (Army)
- Rank: Brigadier General (National Guard); Major General (Brevet)
- Unit: United States Army; New York National Guard
- Commands: Adjutant General of New York
- Wars: Spanish–American War

Nelson H. Henry (April 27, 1855 – March 16, 1923) was an American medical doctor, politician, and military officer from New York. A Republican, he served in the New York State Assembly from 1899 to 1901. From 1910 to 1914, he held a political appointment as Surveyor of the Port of New York. A longtime member of the New York National Guard, he served as Adjutant General of New York from 1902 to 1910. Henry joined the United States Volunteers for the Spanish–American War in 1898. He was promoted to major general by brevet shortly before leaving the adjutant general's post.

== Early life ==
Nelson Herrick Henry was born on Staten Island, New York on April 27, 1855, a son of Joshua J. Henry and Mary Caroline (Herrick) Henry. He attended private and public schools in New York City, followed by studies at the College of the City of New York. In 1876, he began attendance at the Columbia University College of Physicians and Surgeons, from which he graduated with an MD in 1879.

After completing his medical degree, Henry was an intern at Roosevelt Hospital from 1879 to 1880, followed by a year as an intern at New York Nursery and Child's Hospital. After his internships, Henry practiced medicine in New York City. He was eventually appointed attending surgeon at Trinity Hospital. In addition, he was named physician in charge of the gynecological class of New York Hospital's Outdoor Department.

A Republican in politics, in 1898 he was elected to represent the New York County 5th district in the New York State Assembly. He was reelected twice, and served from January 1, 1899 to December 31, 1901. During his second term, Henry was chairman of the Assembly's Committee on Public Health. In 1901, Henry married Sarah Bell (Rodgers) Sloane (1863–1936).

== Military career ==
In March 1883, Henry joined the New York National Guard, receiving a first lieutenant's commission as assistant surgeon of the 12th Infantry Regiment. In May 1884, he received promotion to captain. In January 1888, Henry was assigned as regimental surgeon and promoted to major. In April 1893, he was promoted to colonel and assigned as the New York National Guard's assistant surgeon. Henry was discharged from the National Guard in April 1895.

Henry returned to military service in March 1897, assigned as surgeon of the New York National Guard with the rank of colonel. In July 1898, Henry requested active duty for the Spanish–American War, and was commissioned as a major of United States Volunteers. He was assigned as surgeon of Second Division, Fourth Army Corps, and served at training camps in Tampa, Florida and Huntsville, Alabama until receiving his discharge in September.

After his wartime service, Henry returned to service with the National Guard. In December 1900, he was again appointed surgeon of the New York National Guard with the rank of colonel, to date from March 1897. In January 1902, Henry was appointed Adjutant General of New York and promoted to brigadier general. He served until resigning on May 31, 1910; In February 1910, he received promotion to major general by brevet from Governor Charles Evans Hughes.

== Later career ==
Henry resigned as adjutant general in order to accept appointment as US Surveyor of the Port of New York, succeeding James S. Clarkson. The surveyor was one of three officials, along with the collector and the naval officer, who were responsible for collecting customs on imports arriving by ship and assessing fines for importers who attempted to evade paying the duties. (Note: The naval officer was a political appointee, not a military one. The position was called "naval" because the incumbent was expected to board and inspect ships to aid the surveyor and collector in estimating the duties owed.) Henry served as surveyor until June 1914, and was succeeded by Thomas E. Rush.

In 1915, Henry was appointed Water Register of the City of New York. The register was in charge of the Bureau of Water Register in the city's Department of Water Supply, Gas & Electricity, and was responsible for setting rates, collecting payments, and approving permits for high-volume commercial water use. Henry served in this post until resigning in May 1918.

Henry was a member of the Army and Navy Club of New York City, Military Order of Foreign Wars, United Spanish War Veterans, and Delta Kappa Epsilon fraternity. He died at the Army and Navy Club after experiencing a stroke while conversing with friends. He was buried at Cemetery of the Evergreens in Brooklyn.
