= Clarke River =

There are several rivers called the Clarke River.

- Clarke River (Queensland), Australia
- Clarke River (Grey District), New Zealand
- Clarke River (Tasman), Tasman Region, New Zealand
- Clarke River (Westland District), New Zealand

== See also ==
- Clark River, tributary of the Aorere River, New Zealand
- Clarke's River, Dominica
