= Clarkesville (disambiguation) =

Clarkesville may refer to:

- Clarkesville, Georgia
- Clarkesville, Alabama
- Clarkesville, Illinois

== See also ==
- Clarksville (disambiguation)
