= Clarkville =

Clarkville may refer to:

- Clarkville, New Brunswick, a community in Canada
- Clarkville, New Zealand, a town in New Zealand

== See also ==
- Clarksville (disambiguation)
