= Clarksburg =

Clarksburg may refer to the following places:

Canada

- Clarksburg, Ontario, a community of The Blue Mountains, Ontario

United States of America

- Clarksburg, California
  - Clarksburg AVA, an American Viticultural Area
- Clarksburg, former name of Clarksville, California
- Clarksburg, Indiana
- Clarksburg, Kentucky in Lewis County along Kentucky Route 10
- Clarksburg, Maryland
- Clarksburg, Massachusetts
- Clarksburg, Michigan
- Clarksburg, Missouri
- Clarksburg, New Jersey
- Clarksburg, New York
- Clarksburg, Ohio
- Clarksburg, Pennsylvania
- Clarksburg, Tennessee
- Clarksburg, West Virginia

== See also ==
- Clarkstown, New York
- Clarksville (disambiguation)
