= James Clarkson =

James Clarkson may refer to:

- James Clarkson (footballer) (born 1972), English-American head coach of the Houston Dash
- James S. Clarkson (1842–1918), American Republican National Committee chairman
- James A. Clarkson (1906–1970), American mathematician
- Buster Clarkson (1915–1989), American baseball player
