= Clarksville, New Jersey =

Clarksville is the name of some places in the U.S. state of New Jersey:

- Clarksville, Hunterdon County, New Jersey
- Clarksville, Mercer County, New Jersey

== See also ==
- Clarksville (disambiguation)
