= Hollis Godfrey =

American writer and engineer

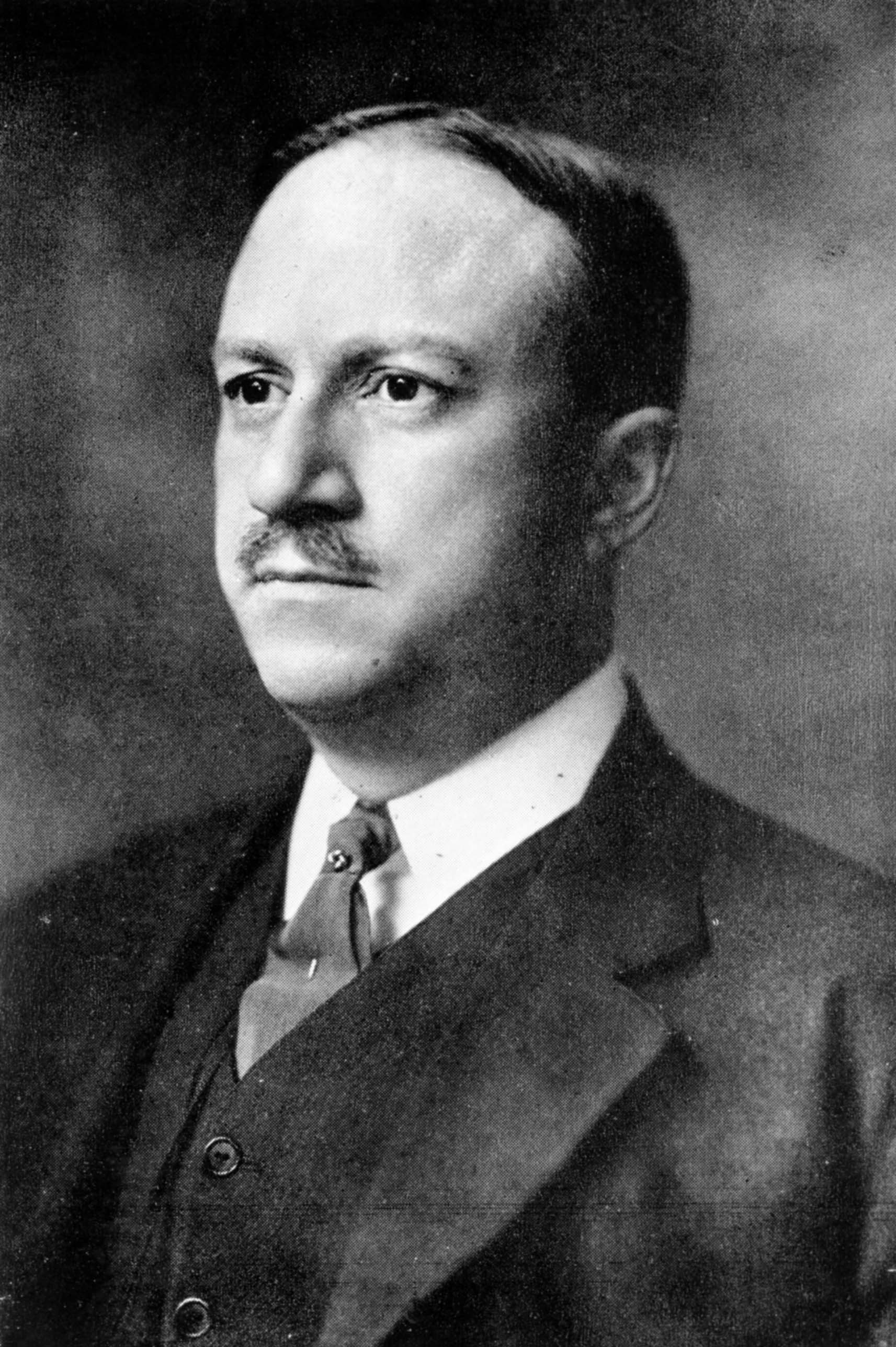
Hollis Godfrey circa 1913.

Hollis Godfrey (1874 – January 17, 1936) was an American writer, teacher, engineering consultant, and president of the Drexel Institute of Art, Science and Industry.

== Early life and education ==
Hollis Godfrey was born in 1874 in Lynn, Massachusetts. He was educated at Tufts College and Harvard University, receiving degrees in engineering. He went on to earn his Ph.D. in engineering from Massachusetts Institute of Technology in 1889. After graduation Godfrey stayed on to teach at his alma mater, the Massachusetts Institute of Technology. From 1906 to 1910 Godfrey was the administrator of scientific studies at the Girl's High School of Practical Arts in Boston.

== Writing career ==
While employed at the School of Practical Arts in Boston Godfrey published several literary works. These works include the "ingenious scientific novel" The Man Who Ended War in 1908 and Elementary Chemistry in 1909. Published after Elementary Chemistry Godfrey started the series "Young Captains of Industry" the first book, For The Norton Name, being printed in 1909. His article "The Air of the City," was selected for admission into the Hodgkins Library of Atmospheric Air.

== Drexel Institute ==
Sometime after moving to Philadelphia Godfrey was commissioned to survey the Drexel Institute of Art, Science and Industry's facility. The original intent of the survey was possibly to see if the Institute would be appropriate for the "training [of] city employees." As a result of his survey he recommended that the institute be restructured internally. He was then offered the presidency of the Institute by the board of trustees and assumed office on December 1, 1913. During his presidency, per his survey, Godfrey reorganized the Institute by consolidating departments, creating three schools, and standardizing the programs of study into two- and four-year programs. In January 1919 Godfrey developed the cooperative educational system in the School of Engineering. Godfrey resigned on October 1, 1921.

== Advisory commission and later life ==
In 1916, during his tenure at Drexel, Godfrey was selected by President Woodrow Wilson to be an advisory member for the Council of National Defense, an organization formed to coordinate resources and industry for national security. Godfrey served in that capacity, advising in the area of engineering and education, from 1916 to 1918. In his last year at Drexel he established the Council of Management Education in Boston in March 1920, following his resignation at Drexel he became chairman of the council. He later went on to be president of the Engineering-Economics Foundation. He died on January 17, 1936.
