= Clarksville Historic District =

Clarksville Historic District may refer to:

- Clarksville Historic District (Clarksville, Missouri), listed on the NRHP in Missouri
- Clarksville Historic District (Austin, Texas), listed on the NRHP in Texas
- Clarksville Historic District (Clarksville, Virginia), listed on the NRHP in Virginia

== See also ==
- Clarksville (disambiguation)
- Clarksville Architectural District, Clarksville, Tennessee, a historic district listed on the NRHP in Montgomery County, Tennessee
- Clarksville Industrial District, Clarksville, Tennessee, a historic district listed on the NRHP in Montgomery County, Tennessee
