= Franklin County Seminary =

- U.S. National Register of Historic Places
- U.S. Historic district – Contributing property
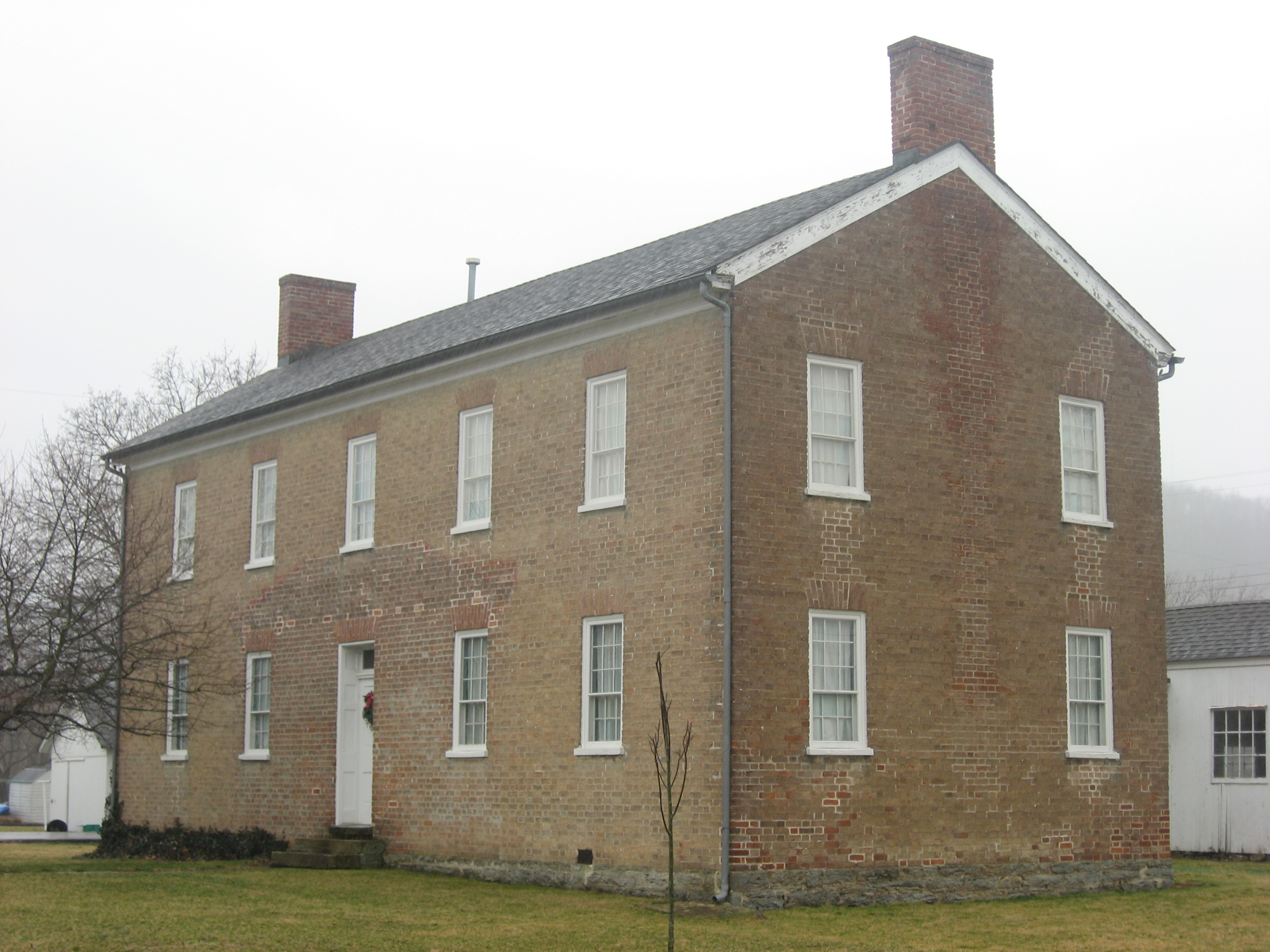
- Franklin County Seminary, March 2012

- Location within Indiana Location within the United States
- Location: 412 5th St., Brookville, Indiana
- Coordinates: 39°25′10″N 85°0′31″W
- Area: 0.4 acres (0.16 ha)
- Built: 1831
- Architectural style: Federal
- NRHP reference No.: 74000020
- Added to NRHP: March 28, 1974

Franklin County Seminary is a historic school building located at Brookville, Indiana. It was built in 1831, and is a two-story, five-bay, Federal style brick building. It has a side-gable roof and interior end chimneys. The county seminary closed in 1851.

The Seminary was listed on the National Register of Historic Places in 1974. It is located in the Brookville Historic District.
