= Brookville Historic District (Brookville, Indiana) =

Historic district in Indiana, United States

- U.S. National Register of Historic Places
- U.S. Historic district
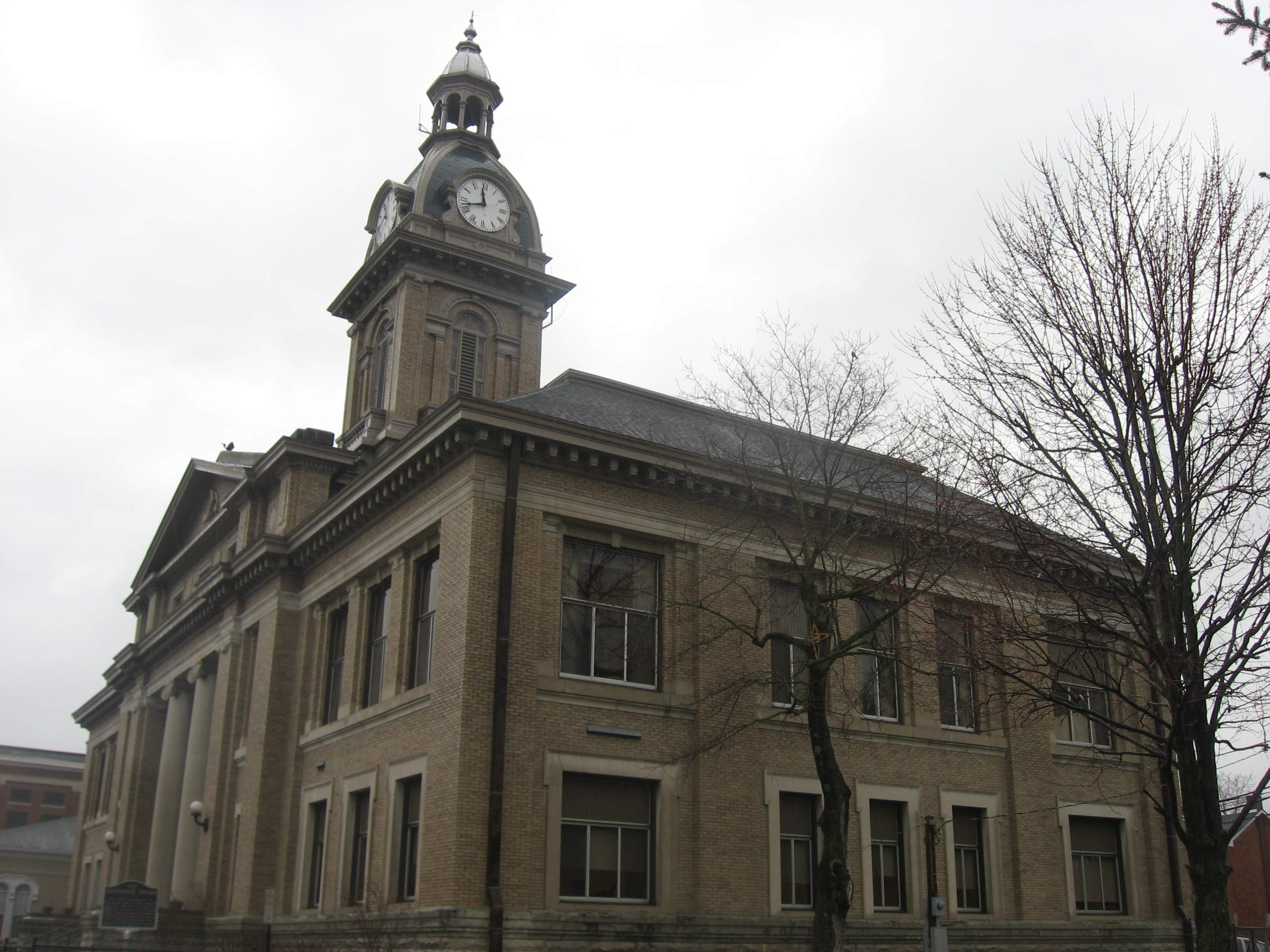
- Franklin County Courthouse, March 2012

- Location within Indiana Location within the United States
- Location: Bounded by E and W fork of Whitewater River and IN 101, Brookville, Indiana
- Coordinates: 39°25′22″N 85°0′35″W
- Area: 300 acres (120 ha)
- Architect: Multiple
- Architectural style: Greek Revival, Federal
- NRHP reference No.: 75000018
- Added to NRHP: July 25, 1975

Brookville Historic District is a national historic district located at Brookville, Indiana. The district encompasses 682 contributing buildings in the central business district and surrounding residential sections of Brookville. It developed between about 1811 and 1913, and includes notable examples of Federal and Greek Revival style architecture. Located in the district are the separately listed Franklin County Seminary and The Hermitage. Other notable contributing buildings include the James Brown Ray House (1811–1820), Old State Bank (c. 1817), James N. Tyner House (c. 1818), Old Brick Meeting House (1810–1821), Franklin County Courthouse (1853–1859), St. Michael's Catholic Church (1857–1868, 1901), Howland-Farquahar-Goodwin House (1855), Valley House Hotel (1842), and the Presbyterian Church (1854–1855).

It was listed on the National Register of Historic Places in 1975.
