= Brookville, Indiana =

- Town
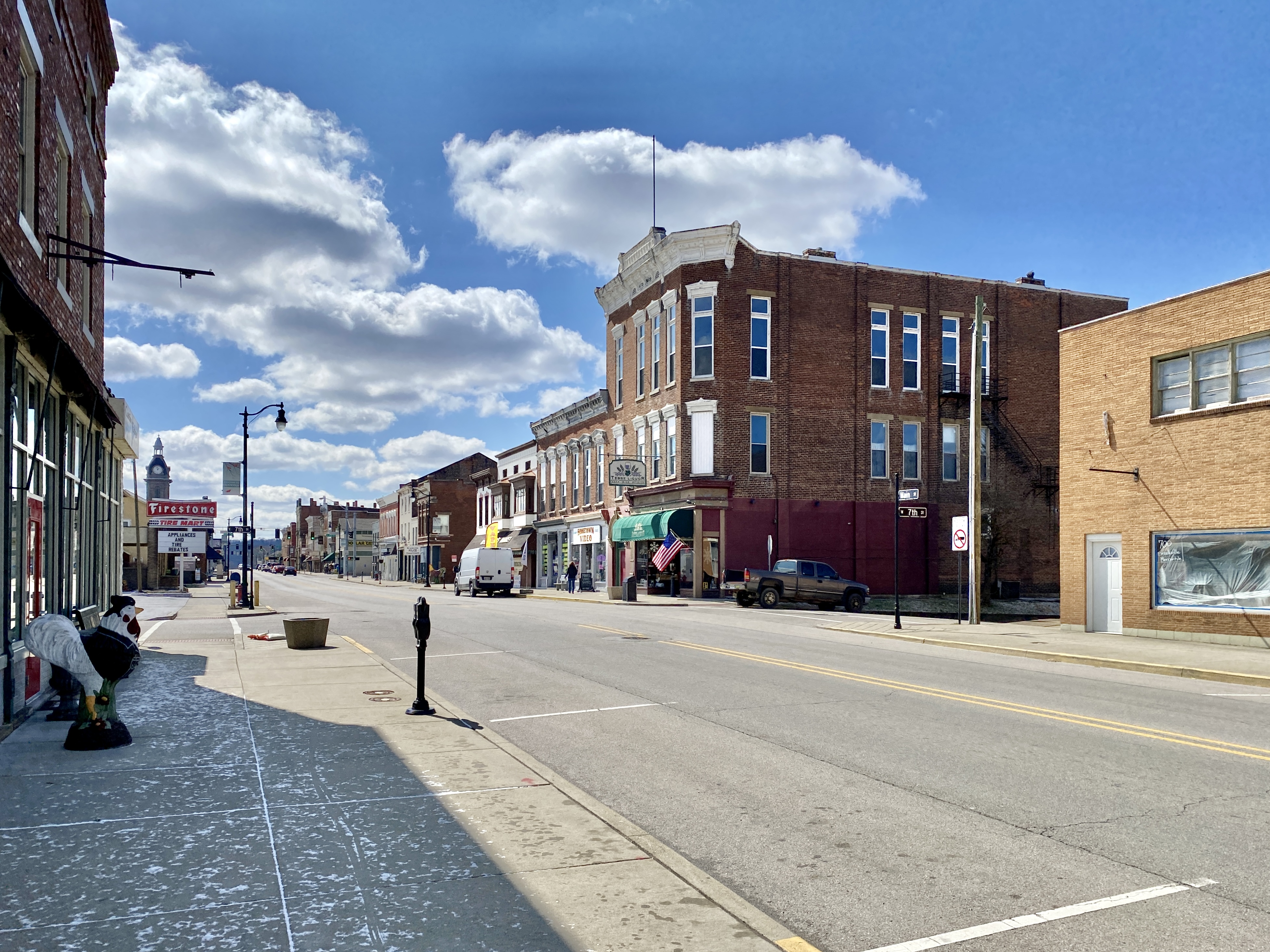
- Main Street in Brookville

- Logo

- Location of Brookville in Franklin County, Indiana
- Coordinates: 39°25′35″N 85°00′12″W
- Country: United States
- State: Indiana
- County: Franklin
- Township: Brookville

Area
  - Total: 1.45 sq mi (3.75 km^{2})
  - Land: 1.40 sq mi (3.62 km^{2})
  - Water: 0.050 sq mi (0.13 km^{2})
- Elevation: 627 ft (191 m)

Population (2020)
  - Total: 2,622
  - Density: 1,876.8/sq mi (724.62/km^{2})
- Time zone: UTC-5 (EST)
  - Summer (DST): UTC-5 (EST)
- ZIP code: 47012
- Area code: 765
- FIPS code: 18-08182
- GNIS feature ID: 2396609
- Website: brookville.in.gov

Brookville is a town in Brookville Township, Franklin County, Indiana, United States. The town is the county seat of and the largest community entirely within Franklin County. The population was 2,622 at the 2020 census.

== History ==
Brookville was platted in 1808 by Thomas Manwarring. The town derives its name from Brooks, the maiden name of a settler's mother. A post office has been in operation at Brookville since 1816.

== Geography ==
Brookville contains the confluence of the east and west forks of the Whitewater River; the East Fork forms a portion of the eastern boundary of the town. Brookville is also at the southern end of Brookville Lake, impounded in 1974 by the United States Army Corps of Engineers.

According to the 2010 census, Brookville has a total area of 1.54 square miles (3.99 km^{2}), of which 1.5 square miles (3.88 km^{2}) (or 97.4%) is land and 0.04 square miles (0.10 km^{2}) (or 2.6%) is water.

=== Climate ===
The climate in this area is characterized by hot, humid summers and generally mild to cool winters. According to the Köppen Climate Classification system, Brookville has a humid subtropical climate, abbreviated "Cfa" on climate maps.

Climate data for Brookville, Indiana (1991–2020 normals, extremes 1925–present)
Month	Jan	Feb	Mar	Apr	May	Jun	Jul	Aug	Sep	Oct	Nov	Dec	Year
Record high °F (°C)	75 (24)	78 (26)	88 (31)	89 (32)	96 (36)	105 (41)	108 (42)	108 (42)	104 (40)	94 (34)	86 (30)	76 (24)	108 (42)
Mean maximum °F (°C)	60.4 (15.8)	65.6 (18.7)	75.4 (24.1)	83.4 (28.6)	89.1 (31.7)	93.4 (34.1)	95.0 (35.0)	94.2 (34.6)	92.4 (33.6)	85.4 (29.7)	73.3 (22.9)	64.2 (17.9)	96.5 (35.8)
Mean daily maximum °F (°C)	38.1 (3.4)	42.4 (5.8)	53.0 (11.7)	65.8 (18.8)	75.6 (24.2)	83.6 (28.7)	87.1 (30.6)	86.4 (30.2)	80.5 (26.9)	68.3 (20.2)	54.3 (12.4)	42.6 (5.9)	64.8 (18.2)
Daily mean °F (°C)	29.3 (−1.5)	32.5 (0.3)	41.8 (5.4)	53.2 (11.8)	63.4 (17.4)	71.9 (22.2)	75.4 (24.1)	74.4 (23.6)	67.5 (19.7)	55.3 (12.9)	43.4 (6.3)	34.1 (1.2)	53.5 (11.9)
Mean daily minimum °F (°C)	20.5 (−6.4)	22.6 (−5.2)	30.6 (−0.8)	40.5 (4.7)	51.2 (10.7)	60.1 (15.6)	63.7 (17.6)	62.3 (16.8)	54.5 (12.5)	42.4 (5.8)	32.6 (0.3)	25.5 (−3.6)	42.2 (5.7)
Mean minimum °F (°C)	−1.5 (−18.6)	4.1 (−15.5)	14.3 (−9.8)	26.3 (−3.2)	36.1 (2.3)	48.0 (8.9)	53.9 (12.2)	51.7 (10.9)	40.9 (4.9)	28.6 (−1.9)	19.4 (−7.0)	8.0 (−13.3)	−4.4 (−20.2)
Record low °F (°C)	−31 (−35)	−22 (−30)	−9 (−23)	16 (−9)	25 (−4)	36 (2)	44 (7)	40 (4)	23 (−5)	15 (−9)	−7 (−22)	−20 (−29)	−31 (−35)
Average precipitation inches (mm)	3.36 (85)	2.67 (68)	3.58 (91)	4.60 (117)	4.79 (122)	4.89 (124)	3.89 (99)	3.00 (76)	2.96 (75)	3.30 (84)	3.40 (86)	3.37 (86)	43.81 (1,113)
Average snowfall inches (cm)	6.1 (15)	5.0 (13)	2.1 (5.3)	0.0 (0.0)	0.0 (0.0)	0.0 (0.0)	0.0 (0.0)	0.0 (0.0)	0.0 (0.0)	0.1 (0.25)	0.3 (0.76)	4.0 (10)	17.6 (45)
Average precipitation days (≥ 0.01 in)	10.5	9.3	10.9	11.9	12.7	11.0	9.8	8.3	7.8	8.7	9.5	11.3	121.7
Average snowy days (≥ 0.1 in)	3.8	3.5	1.4	0.2	0.0	0.0	0.0	0.0	0.0	0.1	0.5	3.0	12.5
Source: NOAA

== Demographics ==
Historical population
Census	Pop.	Note	%±
1850	1,177		—
1860	1,284		9.1%
1880	1,813		—
1890	2,028		11.9%
1900	2,037		0.4%
1910	2,169		6.5%
1920	2,220		2.4%
1930	2,148		−3.2%
1940	2,194		2.1%
1950	2,538		15.7%
1960	2,596		2.3%
1970	2,864		10.3%
1980	2,980		4.1%
1990	2,529		−15.1%
2000	2,652		4.9%
2010	2,596		−2.1%
2020	2,622		1.0%
U.S. Decennial Census

=== 2020 census ===
As of the 2020 census, Brookville had a population of 2,622. The median age was 41.8 years. 22.2% of residents were under the age of 18 and 23.4% of residents were 65 years of age or older. For every 100 females there were 91.5 males, and for every 100 females age 18 and over there were 86.1 males age 18 and over.

0.0% of residents lived in urban areas, while 100.0% lived in rural areas.

There were 1,187 households in Brookville, of which 26.6% had children under the age of 18 living in them. Of all households, 38.8% were married-couple households, 18.6% were households with a male householder and no spouse or partner present, and 35.3% were households with a female householder and no spouse or partner present. About 36.8% of all households were made up of individuals and 19.9% had someone living alone who was 65 years of age or older.

There were 1,368 housing units, of which 13.2% were vacant. The homeowner vacancy rate was 1.5% and the rental vacancy rate was 9.4%.

Racial composition as of the 2020 census
Race	Number	Percent
White	2,500	95.3%
Black or African American	0	0.0%
American Indian and Alaska Native	16	0.6%
Asian	14	0.5%
Native Hawaiian and Other Pacific Islander	0	0.0%
Some other race	7	0.3%
Two or more races	85	3.2%
Hispanic or Latino (of any race)	42	1.6%

=== 2010 census ===
As of the census of 2010, there were 2,596 people, 1,160 households, and 673 families living in the town. The population density was 1,730.7 inhabitants per square mile (668.2/km^{2}). There were 1,307 housing units at an average density of 871.3 per square mile (336.4/km^{2}). The racial makeup of the town was 97.5% White, 0.3% African American, 0.3% Native American, 0.2% Asian, 0.8% from other races, and 0.9% from two or more races. Hispanic or Latino people of any race were 1.6% of the population.

There were 1,160 households, of which 29.2% had children under the age of 18 living with them, 39.4% were married couples living together, 12.7% had a female householder with no husband present, 5.9% had a male householder with no wife present, and 42.0% were non-families. 37.8% of all households were made up of individuals, and 20.7% had someone living alone who was 65 years of age or older. The average household size was 2.24 and the average family size was 2.91.

The median age in the town was 39.6 years. 24.1% of residents were under the age of 18; 9.2% were between the ages of 18 and 24; 22.4% were from 25 to 44; 24% were from 45 to 64; and 20.2% were 65 years of age or older. The gender makeup of the town was 46.8% male and 53.2% female.

=== 2000 census ===
As of the census of 2000, there were 2,652 people, 1,145 households, and 683 families living in the town. The population density was 1,982.4 inhabitants per square mile (765.4/km^{2}). There were 1,276 housing units at an average density of 953.8/mi^{2} (367.7/km^{2}). The racial makeup of the town was 98.91% White, 0.04% African American, 0.19% Native American, 0.34% Asian, 0.19% from other races, and 0.34% from two or more races. Hispanic or Latino people of any race were 0.53% of the population.

There were 1,145 households, out of which 26.3% had children under the age of 18 living with them, 43.8% were married couples living together, 12.2% had a female householder with no husband present, and 40.3% were non-families. 36.5% of all households were made up of individuals, and 21.0% had someone living alone who was 65 years of age or older. The average household size was 2.24 and the average family size was 2.93.

In the town, the population was spread out, with 23.5% under the age of 18, 8.3% from 18 to 24, 26.7% from 25 to 44, 19.8% from 45 to 64, and 21.6% who were 65 years of age or older. The median age was 39 years. For every 100 females, there were 85.1 males. For every 100 females age 18 and over, there were 84.7 males.

The median income for a household in the town was $29,390, and the median income for a family was $37,212. Males had a median income of $29,009 versus $23,910 for females. The per capita income for the town was $17,360. About 4.4% of families and 8.0% of the population were below the poverty line, including 6.6% of those under age 18 and 8.6% of those age 65 or over.

== Arts and culture ==
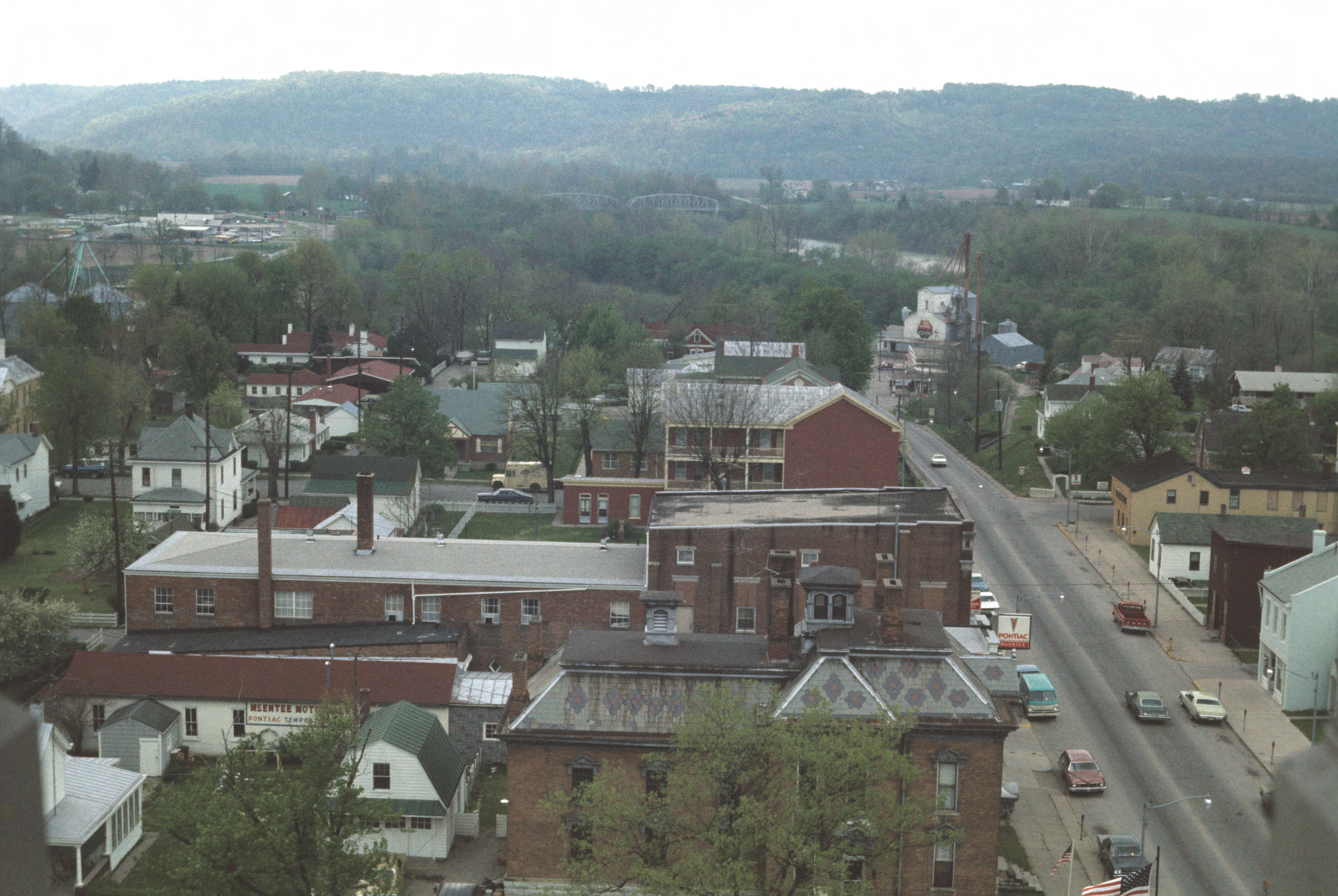
Aerial view of Brookville

The Brookville Historic District, Franklin County Seminary, The Hermitage, and Whitewater Canal Historic District are listed on the National Register of Historic Places.

The town has a free lending library, the Franklin County Public Library District.

== Infrastructure ==
=== Transportation ===
The main mode of transportation is by road. Major routes running through the town include U.S. Route 52, State Road 1, State Road 101, and State Road 252.

Brookville Reservoir is registered with the Federal Aviation Administration and the International Civil Aviation Organization as a civil airport assigned ICAO code K12I. It is only suitable for aircraft capable of water landing because there are no paved runways. Brookville Reservoir Airport is owned by the Indiana Department of Natural Resources.

== Notable people ==
- Anna Farquhar Bergengren (1865–?), writer, editor
- Coker F. Clarkson (1811–1890), Iowa senator and agricultural journalist
- James S. Clarkson (1842–1918), Republican political leader and newspaper editor
- Indiana Sopris Cushman (1839–1925), pioneer teacher in Denver, Colorado
- James B. Goudie Jr., Indiana state representative, grist mill owner, and newspaper owner
- Sarah Carmichael Harrell (1844–1929), educator and temperance reformer
- John Templeton McCarty, one of the founders of the fraternity of Phi Gamma Delta
- Minnie Myrtle Miller (1842–1882), writer
- Noah Noble, 5th governor of Indiana
- James B. Ray, 4th governor of Indiana
- John St. John, 8th governor of Kansas
- Stephen Stevens, justice of the Indiana Supreme Court, abolitionist
- Gilbert Van Camp, founder of the Van Camp pork and beans company
- David Wallace, 6th governor of Indiana
- Lew Wallace, 11th governor of New Mexico Territory, Union general in the American Civil War, author of Ben-Hur: A Tale of the Christ
- H. B. Wilkinson, Arizona state senator
- Roswell Winans, Medal of Honor recipient

== See also ==
- Whitewater Canal
