= Coker Fifield Clarkson =

American lawyer and editor (1870–1930)

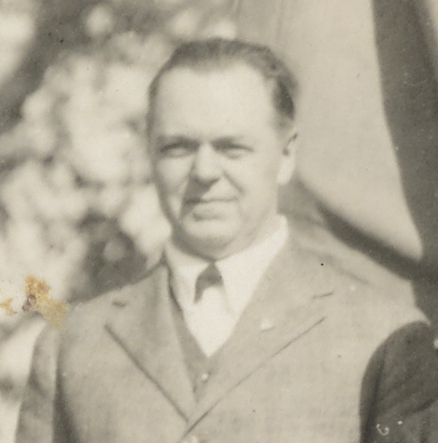
- Clarkson in 1905
- Born: May 11, 1870; Des Moines, Iowa, U.S.
- Died: June 4, 1930 (aged 60); Scarborough, New York, U.S.
- Education: University of Iowa; Harvard University (AB); Harvard Law School (LLB)
- Occupations: Lawyer; editor
- Years active: 1896–1930
- Spouse: Lucy Miller Corkhill (m. 1898)
- Children: 1
- Father: James S. Clarkson
- Relatives: Grosvenor Clarkson (brother); Coker F. Clarkson (grandfather)

Coker Fifield Clarkson (May 11, 1870 – June 4, 1930) was an American automotive lawyer and editor. He was secretary of the mechanical section and assistant general manager of the Association of Licensed Automobile Manufacturers. He was a founder and served as secretary, general manager, and editor-in-chief of the Society of Automotive Engineers from 1910 to his death in 1930. He was a member of the Automotive Products Section of the War Industries Board, the Council of National Defense, and was secretary of the truck committee of the United States Quartermaster Department during World War I.

== Early life ==
Coker Fifield Clarkson was born on May 11, 1870, in Des Moines, Iowa, to Anna (née Howell) and James S. Clarkson. His grandfather was Iowa politician and agricultural journalist Coker F. Clarkson. At the age of 14, he attended the University of Iowa, but did not graduate. He graduated from Phillips Exeter Academy in 1888. He graduated from Harvard University with a Bachelor of Arts in 1894. He graduated from Harvard Law School with a Bachelor of Laws in 1896. He was admitted to the bar in Philadelphia in 1896. He was a member of Delta Kappa Epsilon, the Pow Wow Law Club, and the Hasty Pudding Club. He was also a member of Phi Kappa Psi.

== Career ==
Clarkson practiced law with Alexander & Magill of Philadelphia from 1896 to 1898. He assisted in the installation of an underground telephone system in Philadelphia and was associated with the Standard Telephone Company. In 1898, he moved to New York City. He was admitted to the bar in New York in February 1899. He practiced with Tracy, Boardman & Platt until July 1900. He then practiced alone at a Park Row address and later at 42nd Street in New York City as a technology, corporate, and patent lawyer. He specialized in technical and automotive matters. He was a member of the law committee of the National Civic Federation. He was a delegate to the International Mining Congress in July 1901.

From 1905 to 1909, he was secretary of the mechanical section and assistant general manager of the Association of Licensed Automobile Manufacturers (ALAM). They operated under the Selden patent. With ALAM, Clarkson edited four annual volumes of the Handbook of Gasoline Automobiles and two volumes of the mechanical branch bulletins and reports of test. He was inaugurated and edited ALAM's Digest of Current Technical Literature. He was manager and head of the publicity department of ALAM in 1909. He was associated with the National Automobile Chamber of Commerce. He worked with Henry Souther in standardizing spark plugs, wheels, screw threads, and other steel specifications. The mechanical section disbanded following Henry Ford's defeat of the Selden patent in 1910.

In May 1910, Clarkson was hired by Howard E. Coffin and Henry Souther as secretary, general manager, and editor-in-chief of the Society of Automobile Engineers (later the Society of Automotive Engineers) (SAE), the organization that took over the engineering work at ALAM starting in 1910. He was a founder of the society. He was credited with developing automotive design as a "skilled branch of creative science" and under his supervision, the SAE standards division was created. This led to tire and rim sizes having a common basis of measurement for all companies. He remained as secretary and general manager of the SAE until his death. He was also editor of the Journal of Society of Automotive Engineers. He studied electrical engineering and the standardization of material in the laboratory for use in the automotive and telephone and telegraph construction industries.

Clarkson was a member of the Automotive Products Section of the War Industries Board. His brother Grosvenor Clarkson was chairman of the War Industries Board. He was also associated with the Council of National Defense. He was a member of the International Aircraft Standards Board. In 1917, he was secretary of the truck committee of the United States Quartermaster Department. That committee designed the standardized military trucks used by the department. His office was at West 39th Street in New York City.

Clarkson organized and was a member of the Iowa Society of New York. He was also a member of the University Club, the Harvard Club, and the Sleepy Hollow Country Club.

== Personal life ==
Clarkson married Lucy Miller Corkhill, daughter of George B. Corkhill and granddaughter of Samuel Freeman Miller of Washington, D.C., on April 28, 1898. They had one daughter, Olivia Miller. In 1908, he lived on Broadway and 110th Street in New York City. He lived at Sleepy Hollow Farm in Scarborough, New York.

Clarkson died of heart disease at his home in Scarborough on June 4, 1930.
