= James S. Clarkson =

American politician (1842–1918)

James Clarkson
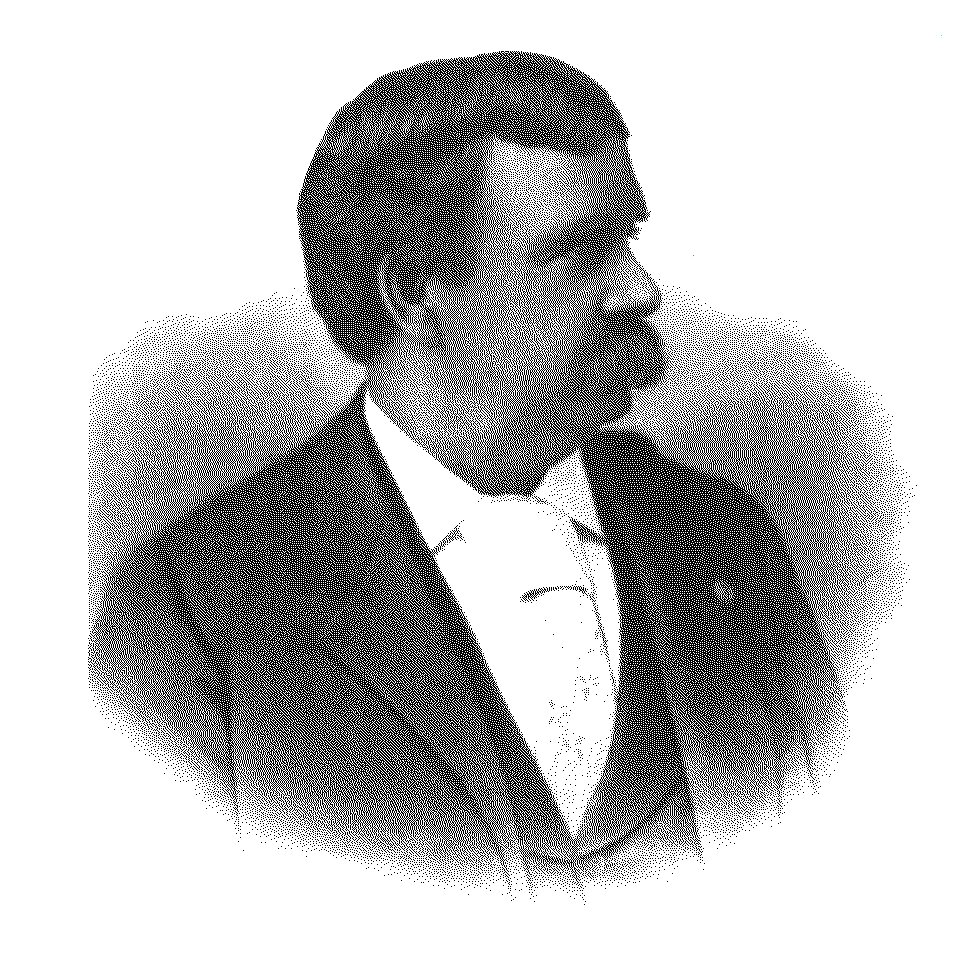

Chair of the Republican National Committee
- In office July 19, 1891 – June 29, 1892
- Preceded by: Matt Quay
- Succeeded by: William Campbell

Personal details
- Born: James Sullivan Clarkson; May 17, 1842 Brookville, Indiana, U.S.
- Died: May 31, 1918 (aged 76) Newark, New Jersey, U.S.
- Resting place: Woodland Cemetery; Des Moines, Iowa, U.S.
- Party: Republican
- Spouse: Anna Howell (m. 1867)
- Children: 3, including Grosvenor and Coker
- Parent: Coker F. Clarkson (father)
- Nickname: Ret Clarkson

James Sullivan Clarkson (May 17, 1842 – May 31, 1918), sometimes known by the nickname "Ret Clarkson", was an American politician and newspaper editor. He helped establish part of the Underground Railroad in Iowa. He was an editor of the Iowa State Register. He was a leader in the Republican Party from the 1860s into the 1890s. He was surveyor of the Port of New York from 1902 to 1910.

== Early life ==
James Sullivan Clarkson was born on May 17, 1842, in Brookville, Indiana, to Elizabeth (née Goudie) and Coker Fifield Clarkson. His father was a newspaper editor and was involved in Whig politics in Indiana. His father later switched to the Republican Party and served in the Iowa senate. His mother died in 1848 and his father married Elizabeth Colescott in 1849. In 1855 or 1856, the family moved to Grundy County, Iowa, and started the Melrose Farm. Clarkson attended public schools in Indiana and Iowa.

== Career ==
From 1856 to 1862, Clarkson established and operated a station and a 28-mile section of the Underground Railroad and helped over 500 slaves runaway to Canada. In 1859, he worked as a schoolteacher. In 1861, he enlisted in an infantry regiment and in 1862 enlisted in a cavalry regiment, but was rejected due to "weak lungs". In 1866, Clarkson and his brother Richard left the family farm to work at the Iowa State Register in Des Moines. He started as a compositor and after six weeks became an assistant foreman and after three months became a foreman. He later became the paper's local editor and as Des Moines correspondent for the Chicago Tribune. By 1869, he was promoted to editor-in-chief of the Register. He received the nickname "Ret" for use of the editorial abbreviation for "return" on copy he wanted to proofread himself. In 1870, Clarkson, his father, and his brother Richard bought the Register from its owners Frank M. Mills and Jacob W. Mills and the three each owned an equal third of the paper. Clarkson remained as editor, his brother ran the business, and his father wrote on agricultural topics. Under his editorship, the paper supported the business wing of the Republican Party and had ties to the Des Moines Regency, a force of Iowa's Republican Party. The paper supported the politics of the Regency, including opposing farmers moving into politics, supporting Prohibition up until the 1890s, and opposing women's suffrage. In 1871, the Clarksons added Coker Clarkson's weekly column "Farm, Orchard and Garden". The sons disagreed with their father on which Republican candidate to support in the 1871 U.S. Senate race. The sons supported William B. Allison and the father sold his share of his company rather than support the candidate. The Clarksons also added a women's section, book reviews, church and courthouse news, a criminal calendar, and a gossip column to the paper. Between 1870 and 1890, the paper's daily circulation rose from around 2,000 to 7,200 subscribers. The paper expanded from four to eight pages and expanded its advertising space.

Clarkson was associated with railroad ventures, including bringing the Chicago, Burlington and Quincy Railroad into Des Moines. He worked with engineer Grenville M. Dodge, businessmen Frederick M. Hubbell and Jefferson S. Polk, and attorney John Runnells in creating a narrow gauge railroad system in Des Moines. The group would later lease the rail network to Jay Gould and his Wabash Railroad. He was also associated with the building of the Des Moines Northern Railroad and the Des Moines Northwest Railroad. He served on the school board in Des Moines. He was also an organizer of Callanan College.

By the 1860s, Clarkson was head of the Republican State Central Committee. He was chairman of the committee in 1866 and from 1869 to 1871. In 1866, he ran for Iowa's 5th but lost to Grenville M. Dodge. From 1871 to 1877, he was postmaster of Des Moines. In 1869, he declined a post as ambassador to Switzerland by President Ulysses S. Grant. From 1880 to 1896, he served on the Republican National Committee. He was committee chairman from 1890 to 1892. He declined a post as ambassador to China in 1890 and another posting from President Benjamin Harrison. He was a delegate-at-large to the Republican National Convention six times, from 1876 to 1896. From 1889 to 1890, he was the First Assistant Postmaster General and then served as a member of the National Republican Executive Committee for 12 years. He was vice chairman of the executive committee for 12 years and served two years as chairman. From 1891 to 1892, he was president of the Republican League of the United States.

In 1891, Clarkson sold his share of the paper to his brother and moved to New York. He was president of the New York and New Jersey Bridge Company from at least 1900 until his death. The company sought to build a bridge over the Hudson River at 49th Street for US$60,000,000. On April 18, 1902, he was appointed by Theodore Roosevelt as surveyor of the Port of New York. He remained in that role until 1910 when he was succeeded by Nelson H. Henry. As surveyor, he recommended an automatic weighing system and helped combat fraud in the department. He also served as president of the Iowa Society in New York from 1907 to 1910.

Clarkson was friends with and helped nominate James G. Blaine for president in 1884. He was a supporter of President Woodrow Wilson and opposed criticism of Wilson during his administration.

== Personal life ==
Clarkson married Anna Howell in 1867. They had three sons, Grosvenor B., Harold, and Coker Fifield. His son Grosvenor served in the Council of National Defense. On March 26, 1879, he became a charter member of Capital City Lodge. He lived at a Sleepy Hollow farm in Tarrytown, New York.

Clarkson died on May 31, 1918, at the home of his brother H. R. Clarkson in Newark, New Jersey. He was buried in the family mausoleum at Woodland Cemetery in Des Moines.

Party political offices
Preceded by Matt Quay	Chair of the Republican National Committee; 1891–1892	Succeeded by William Campbell
