= Clark Glacier =

Clark Glacier may refer to:

- Clark Glacier (Alaska), Glacier Bay National Park and Preserve, Alaska, United States
- Clark Glacier (Antarctica)
- Clark Glacier (Oregon), in Cascade Range, Oregon, United States
- Clark Glacier (Washington), in Cascade Range, Washington, United States

== See also ==
- Clarke Glacier (disambiguation)
