= Clark Center =

Clark Center may refer to:

- Clark Center, Illinois, an unincorporated community in Illinois, U.S.
- Clark Center for the Arts and Sciences, former building at Mission Point, Mackinac Island, Michigan
- Clark Center for the Performing Arts, New York City, U.S. (1959-1989)
- Clark Center for Japanese Art and Culture, a former museum in Hanford, California
- James H. Clark Center, a building at Stanford University, California, U.S., known as the Clark Center

== See also ==
- Clark Center, a new gallery addition to the Clark Art Institute, Williamstown, Massachusetts
- Clark Center, early variant name for Clark, South Dakota
- Clark Center Lutheran Church, Clark County, Dakota
- Edward A. Clark Center for Australian & New Zealand Studies, University of Texas at Austin
- F. G. Clark Center, a multi-purpose arena in Baton Rouge, Louisiana, U.S.
- Stephen P. Clark Government Center, a building in Miami, Florida
- Thomas D. Clark Center for Kentucky History, HQ for the Kentucky Historical Society, Frankfort, Kentucky, U.S.
