= Clarkson, Maryland =

Unincorporated community in Maryland, U.S.

Clarkson is an unincorporated community in Howard County, Maryland, United States. A postal office operated in the community from September 14, 1889, to October 31, 1931. Clarkson was the site of strategic simulations by the U.S. Army in 1922 training manuals.

39°17′53″N 76°56′08″W

== See also ==
Columbia, Maryland
