= Margaret Clarkson =

English artist

- Born: Margaret Clarkson; 13 August 1941 (age 84); Rotherham, West Riding of Yorkshire, UK
- Education: Rotherham School of Art; Bromley College of Art
- Known for: Art
- Notable work: Hurry Up Dad, Morning Milk, Our Convenience, Busy bodies, Tin Baths
- Movement: Nostalgic Art

Margaret Clarkson (born 13 August 1941) was born in Rotherham, West Riding of Yorkshire, England and trained as an artist at Rotherham School of Art and Bromley College of Art. Later she became an art teacher in South Yorkshire. Clarkson works mainly with water colours and is best known for nostalgic scenes set in 1940s and 1950s England.

Clarkson's nostalgic art is a powerful and important historical record of life in Northern working class households, during the post World War II years.

She is known for her paintings, limited edition prints and greeting cards which have been exhibited in galleries and art retail outlets throughout UK, including the National Trust in England, Wales and Northern Ireland. Commissions of her work have included book illustrations such as in the autobiography Life in a Liberty Bodice. Random recollections of a Yorkshire childhood. Clarkson is a member of the Fine Art Trade Guild and was a finalist in their Best Selling Published Artist awards in 2006, 2007 and 2008.
