= Grosvenor Clarkson =

American writer and government official (1882–1937)

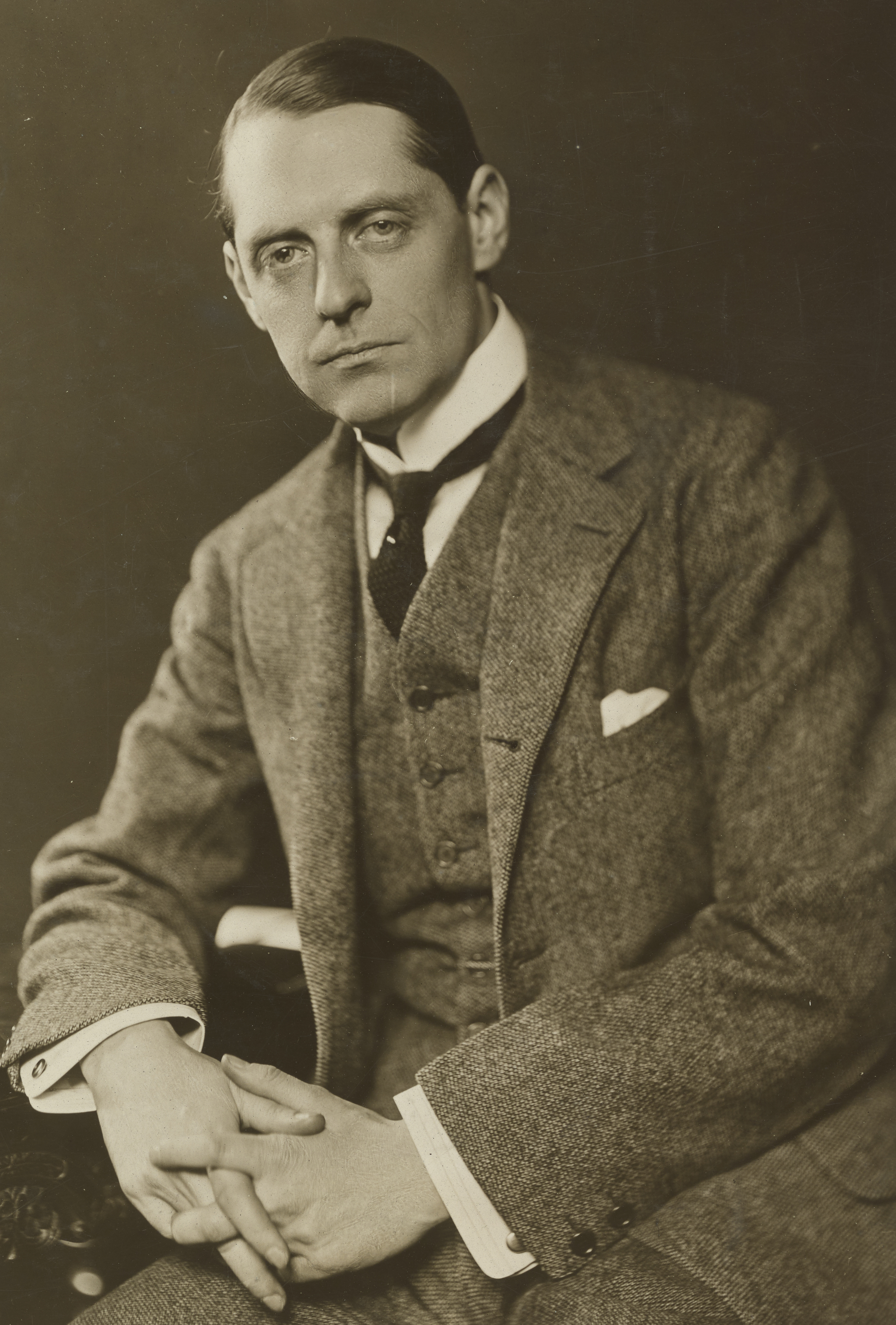
- Portrait of Clarkson, c. 1917–1918

Director of the Council of National Defense
- In office November 1, 1918 – March 1920
- Preceded by: Walter S. Gifford

Personal details
- Born: Grosvenor Blaine Clarkson; September 13, 1882 Des Moines, Iowa, U.S.
- Died: January 23, 1937 (aged 54) New York City, New York, U.S.
- Party: Republican
- Spouse: Helah Reeder (m. 1917; div. 1927)
- Parent: James S. Clarkson (father)
- Relatives: Coker Fifield Clarkson (brother); Coker F. Clarkson (grandfather)
- Occupation: writer; advertiser; civil servant

Grosvenor Blaine Clarkson (September 13, 1882 – January 23, 1937) was an American journalist, writer, and government official. In the early 1900s, he was a reporter with the New York Mail and Express, the New York World, and The New York Times. He then worked as an investigator for the United States Department of the Interior in New Mexico before a career in advertising in New York City. He served as assistant chairman of the committee on industrial preparedness of the United States Naval Consulting Board and later as director of the Council of National Defense.

== Early life ==
Grosvenor Blaine Clarkson was born on September 13, 1882, in Des Moines, Iowa, as one of three children to Anna (née Howell) and James Sullivan Clarkson. His father was a newspaper editor and Republican politician. His grandfather was Iowa state senator Coker F. Clarkson. His mother wrote biographical magazine articles and a biographical book on Drusilla A. Stoddard. His brother Coker Fifield Clarkson was an automotive lawyer and manager of the Society of Automotive Engineers. Clarkson was educated at DeLancey School in Philadelphia and Berkeley School in New York City.

== Career ==
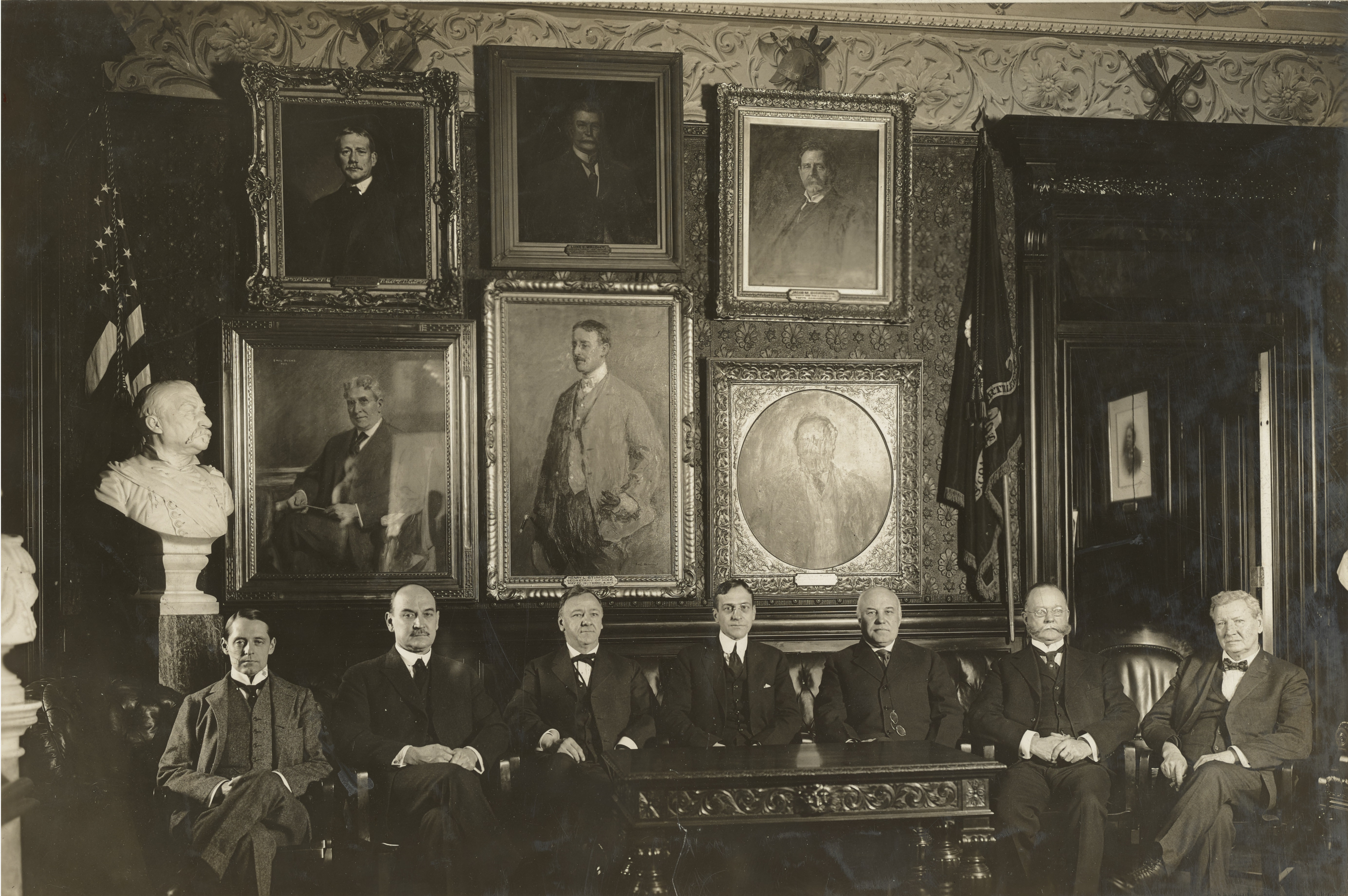
Council of National Defense, Clarkson on the most-left

In 1900, Clarkson started as a newspaper reporter at New York Mail and Express of New York City. He later did staff correspondence and special work for the paper. By 1902, he was staff writer of the New York World and The New York Times.

From 1904 to 1906, Clarkson led investigations for the United States Department of the Interior in the southern district of New Mexico. He was investigating land fraud in the area, including the Tallmadge land fraud case. On May 5, 1906, he was beaten in the face by William Overstreet on Main Street in Roswell, New Mexico, following an "exchange of words" between Clarkson and Overstreet about Clarkson talking about Overstreet and his indictment. Overstreet was subsequently arrested. Clarkson declined a posting as chief inspector of the Department of the Interior and a posting as secretary of the U.S. embassy in Russia. In 1909, he began working in advertising in New York City. He remained in advertising for seven years.

In 1916, Clarkson became one of three heads and the assistant chairman of the committee on industrial preparedness of the United States Naval Consulting Board. The committee made the first inventory of 27,000 industrial plants in the United States to determine their utility for the military. In that role, he also directed the first organized educational campaign in the United States for industrial preparedness.

In the fall of 1916, Clarkson declined the role of director of the newly formed Council of National Defense. In March 1917, he became secretary of the executive office of the Council of National Defense and its advisory commission. Starting in 1918, he organized the council's economic reconstruction and readjustment work. This effort was to help with the high cost of living and demobilization. He helped to spark the movement for community councils in the United States. In September 1918, he directed the council's field division, which was the merging of state and territorial council's section with similar divisions of the women's committees in the council. The field division's organization was across 48 states, 162,000 cities, towns, and community units, and 18,000 committees of women. He became acting director of the council in July 1918. He was later elected as director of the council, succeeding Walter S. Gifford. served in that role from November 1, 1918, to March 1920. He was chairman of the Interdepartmental Defense Board, which studied and classified economic resources for defense in the United States in peace time. He retired as director of the council in March 1920.

Clarkson was senior fellow and counselor of the Engineering Economics Foundation. He was a Republican.

Clarkson wrote magazine articles. He also wrote three books:

- A Tribute and a Look in the Future (1919)
- An Analysis of the High Cost of Living (1919)
- Industrial America in the World War: The Strategy Behind the Line, 1917–1918 (1923)

== Personal life ==
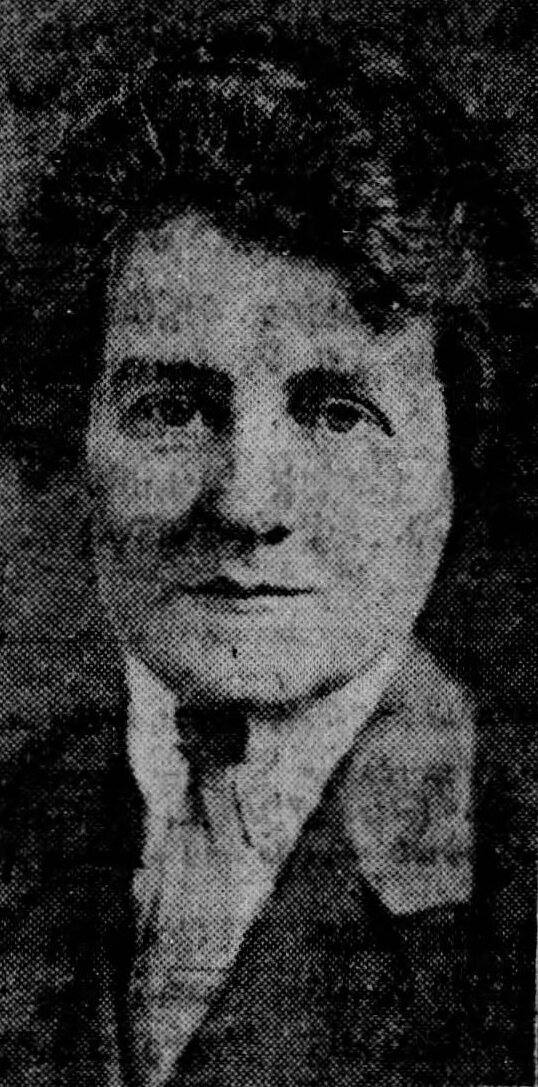
Helah Reeder Clarkson in a 1920 newspaper

Clarkson was engaged to marry Violetta Pierce, daughter of Henry J. Pierce, of Buffalo in November 1907. He later married Helah Reeder, widow of Harold Reeder and daughter of Mrs. A. Cornell Sullivan, of New York City on September 14, 1917. They divorced in 1927. He was a member of the Metropolitan Club of Washington, D.C., and the Sleepy Hollow Country Club of New York.

Clarkson died on January 23, 1937, in New York City.
