= Clarke Sound =

Sound in Nunavut, Canada

- Interactive map of Clarke Sound
- Coordinates: 68°35′N 074°30′W
- Basin countries: Canada
- Settlements: Uninhabited

Clarke Sound is an uninhabited Foxe Basin waterway in Qikiqtaaluk, Nunavut, Canada. It is located between North Tweedsmuir Island and Baffin Island.

The sound was named after Louis Colville Gray Clarke, curator of the Museum of Archaeology and Anthropology, University of Cambridge.
