= Clark, West Virginia =

Unincorporated community in West Virginia, United States

Clark
- Unincorporated community
- Location within the state of West Virginia Clark (the United States)
- Coordinates: 37°24′52″N 81°25′56″W
- Country: United States
- State: West Virginia
- County: McDowell
- Elevation: 1,706 ft (520 m)
- Time zone: UTC-5 (Eastern (EST))
  - Summer (DST): UTC-4 (EDT)
- GNIS ID: 1689227

Clark is an unincorporated community in McDowell County, West Virginia, United States.
