= Clarke Glacier =

Clarke Glacier may refer to:

- Clarke Glacier (Graham Land), Antarctica
- Clarke Glacier (Victoria Land), Antarctica
- Clarke Glacier (Marie Byrd Land), Antarctica

== See also ==
- Clark Glacier (disambiguation)
