= Clarke River (Grey District) =

Coordinates: 42°22′14″S 171°50′22″E

Location
- Country: New Zealand

Physical characteristics
- Mouth
  - location: Grey River
- Length: 12 km (7.5 mi)

The Clarke River, is a river. One of three Clarke rivers in New Zealand's South island, is located in the Grey District. It flows northwest for 12 kilometers before merging with the upper Grey River close to the boundary of Victoria Forest Park.
