= Clarksville, Defiance County, Ohio =

Ghost town in Ohio, United States

Coordinates: 41°25′20″N 84°46′05″W

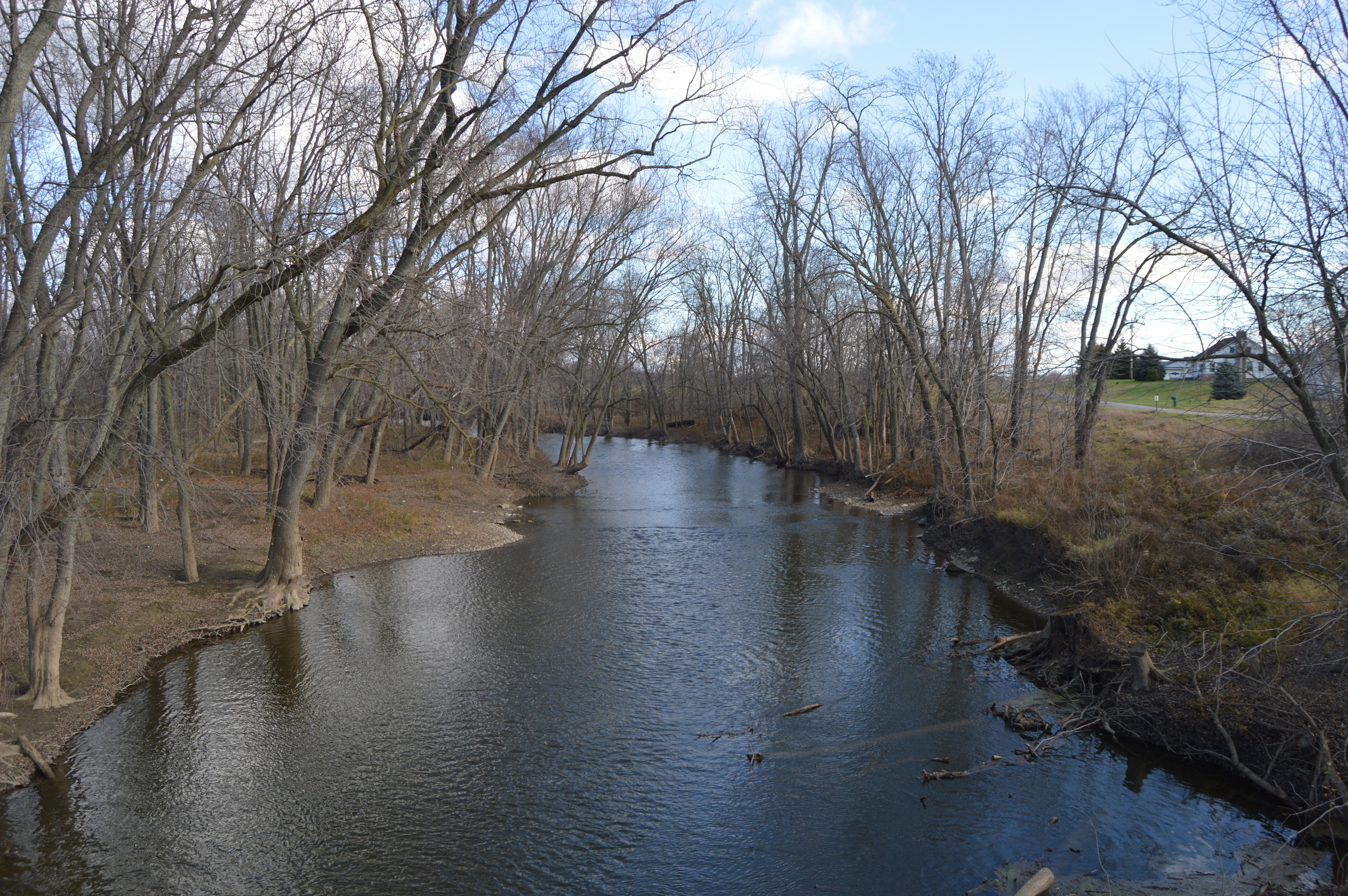
The St. Joseph River at Clarksville

Clarksville is a ghost town in Defiance County, in the U.S. state of Ohio.

== History ==
Clarksville was platted in 1836, and named for Elisha Clark, proprietor.
