= Clarksville, New York (disambiguation) =

Clarksville, New York may refer to:

- Clarksville, Albany County, New York, a hamlet
- Clarksville, Allegany County, New York, a town
- Clarksville, Rockland County, New York, or Clarkstown, a town
