= Clarksville Elementary School =

Clarksville Elementary School may refer to:

- Clarksville Elementary School (Clarksville, Maryland)
- Clarksville Elementary School (Clarksville, New York)
- Clarksville Elementary School (Clarksville, Virginia)
