= Clerke (surname) =

- Agnes Mary Clerke (1842–1907), Irish astronomer and science writer
- Charles Clerke (1741–1779), British naval officer and explorer
- Charles Clerke (footballer) (1857–1944), English footballer
- Ellen Mary Clerke (1840–1906), Irish poet, linguist and journalist
- Francis Clerke (disambiguation)
- John Clerke (disambiguation)
- Clerke baronets, three baronetcies
  - Sir Clement Clerke, 1st Baronet (died 1693), English entrepreneur
  - Sir William Clerke, 8th Baronet (1751–1818), English clergyman
