= Clark Center Lutheran Church =

Historic church in South Dakota, United States

- U.S. National Register of Historic Places
- Location within South Dakota Location within the United States
- Nearest city: Clark, South Dakota
- Coordinates: 44°57′8″N 97°47′21″W
- Area: 7 acres (2.8 ha)
- Built: 1898
- Architectural style: Late Gothic Revival
- NRHP reference No.: 05001336
- Added to NRHP: November 29, 2005

Clark Center Lutheran Church is a historic church in rural Clark County, South Dakota. The church was added to the National Register in 2005.

The Clark Center Lutheran Church congregation was organized in 1883. The church itself was built in 1898. It was constructed of wood in late Gothic Revival architectural style. The church was built on a stone foundation with wood clapboard siding. Sunday school rooms and the sacristy were added to the north side and a front entry added to the southeast corner in 1940.
