= Franklin H. Martin =

American physician (1857–1935)

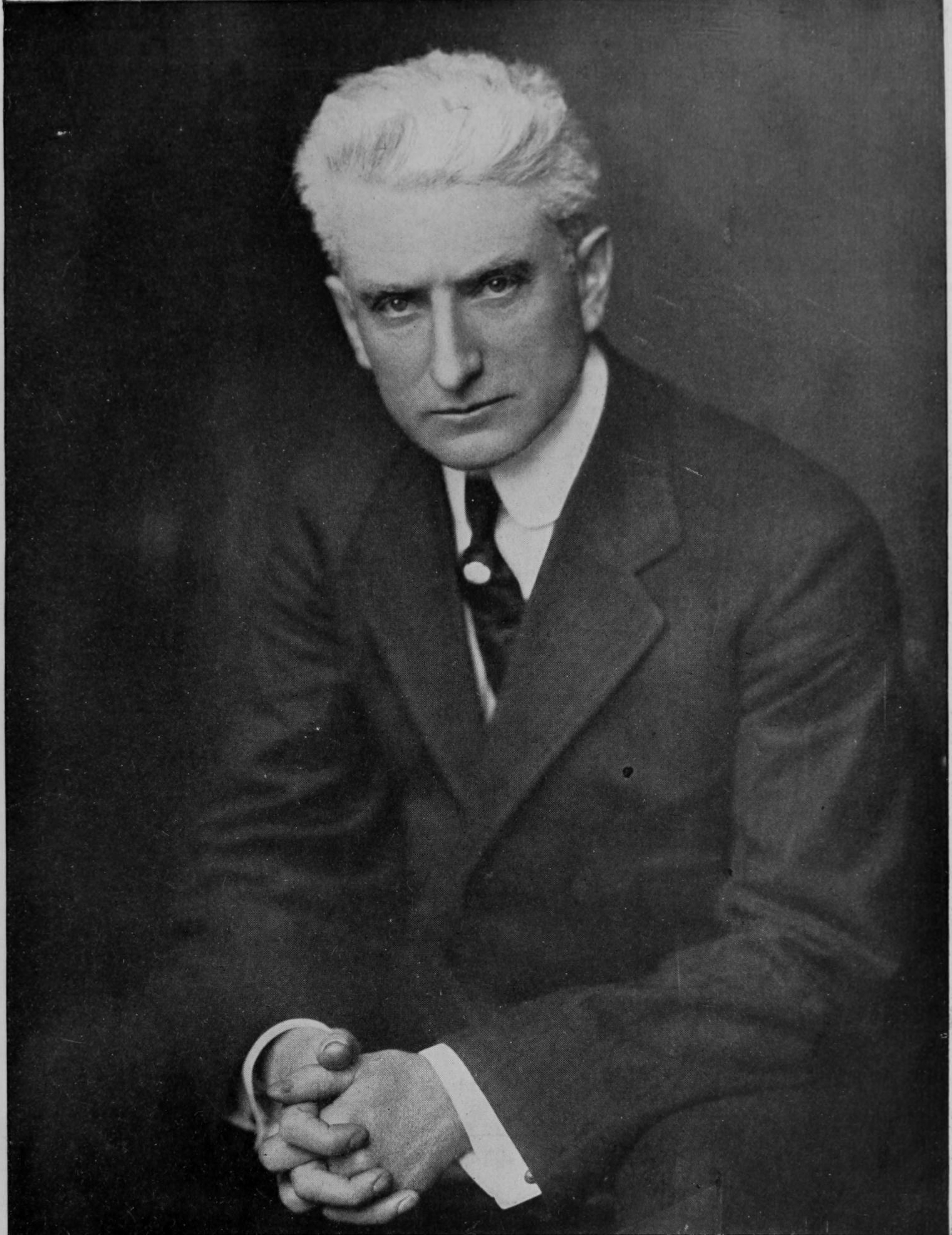
- Martin, c. 1920
- Born: Franklin Henry Martin; July 13, 1857; Ixonia, Wisconsin, U.S.
- Died: March 7, 1935 (aged 77); Tucson, Arizona, U.S.
- Resting place: Graceland Cemetery; Chicago, Illinois, U.S.
- Education: Chicago Medical College (M.D.)
- Occupation: Physician
- Years active: 1880–1935
- Employer: Mercy Hospital
- Spouse: Isabelle Hallister (m. 1886)

Franklin Henry Martin (July 13, 1857 – March 7, 1935) was an American physician. He was the founder of the Journal of the American College of Surgeons and established the American College of Surgeons. He was a member of the National Advisory Commission of the Council of National Defense during World War I.

== Early life ==
Franklin Henry Martin was born on July 13, 1857, in Ixonia, Wisconsin, to Edmond Martin. His father fought and died during the Civil War. He worked as a farmhand, brickmaker and school teacher before being encouraged by an aunt to study medicine. Martin graduated from Chicago Medical College in 1880 with a M.D.

== Career ==
Martin served as an intern at Mercy Hospital in Chicago. He would practice medicine at Mercy Hospital for the remainder of his life.

In 1883, Martin founded the Chicago South-Side Medico-Social Society where medical papers could be presented. By 1905, Martin established the journal Surgery, Gynecology & Obstetrics, now called the Journal of the American College of Surgeons, with other physicians. He served as the managing editor of the journal from 1905 to 1935.

In 1913, Martin established the American College of Surgeons. He served as the Director-General from 1913 to 1935.

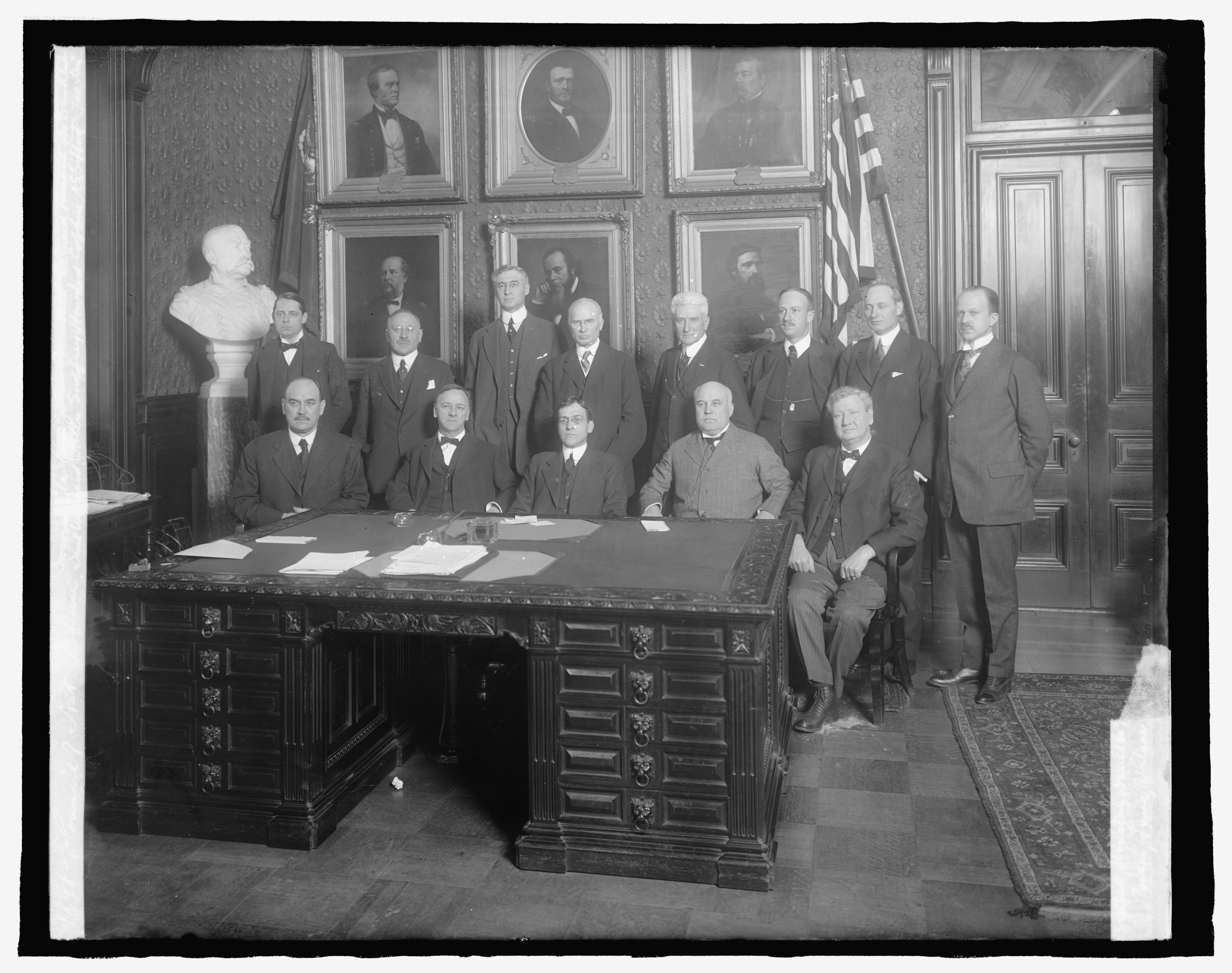
Martin and the Council of National Defense, 1916–17

After the outbreak of World War I, Martin worked with college fellows to approach the Surgeon General of the U.S. Army to aid in reorganizing and enlarging the Medical Reserve Corps. In 1916, Martin was appointed by President Woodrow Wilson to serve on the National Advisory Commission of the Council of National Defense as the medical representative.

Martin wrote Electricity in Diseases of Women and Obstetrics in 1892. He also wrote South America from a Surgeon's Point of View in 1922.

== Personal life ==
Martin married Isabelle Hallister, the daughter of the Chicago physician John H. Hallister, in 1886.

Martin died on March 7, 1935, in Tucson, Arizona, following a short illness. He was buried in Graceland Cemetery in Chicago.
