= Clarksville High School =

Clarksville High School can refer to:

- Clarksville High School (Arkansas)
- Clarksville High School (Indiana)
- Clarksville High School (Iowa)
- Clarksville High School (Tennessee)
- Clarksville High School (Clarksville, Texas)
