= Clarkston =

Clarkston may refer to:

== Places ==
=== United States ===
- Clarkston, Georgia
- Clarkston, Michigan
- Clarkston, Utah
- Clarkston, Washington
- Clarkston, Gallatin County, Montana

=== Scotland ===
- Clarkston, East Renfrewshire
- Clarkston, North Lanarkshire, an area of Airdrie

== Media ==
- Clarkston, a play by Samuel D. Hunter

== See also ==
- Clarkson (disambiguation)
