= Clarksville, California =

Unincorporated community in California, United States

Clarksville
- Unincorporated community
- Location in California Clarksville (the United States)
- Coordinates: 38°39′18″N 121°03′09″W
- Country: United States
- State: California
- County: El Dorado
- Elevation: 676 ft (206 m)

Clarksville (Tong Ranch) is an unincorporated community in El Dorado County, California, United States. It is located 14 miles (23 km) west-southwest of Placerville, at an elevation of 676 feet (206 m).

Clarksville was established during the California gold rush and at one point had over one thousand residents and several businesses. By 1931 only twenty residents remained. Little remains today, but the Clarksville Heritage Society preserves the town's history.

A post office operated at Clarksville from 1855 to 1924 and from 1927 to 1934.
