= James B. Goudie Jr. =

American politician

James B. Goudie Jr. (December 3, 1769 – July 29, 1836) was an American politician and pioneer in Brookville, Indiana.

== Biography ==
James Goudie Jr., was the son of James Goudie and Rachel Liggett, born in Fayette County, Pennsylvania. James Sr. was of Northern Ireland and Rachel was of Chester County, Pennsylvania.

On October 13, 1813, he purchased 154.5 acres (0.625 km^{2}) of land in Franklin County, Indiana from the Cincinnati Land Office.

Goudie owned the first grist mill in Franklin County, Indiana. He married Mary Alexander circa 1794. He owned the local newspaper "The Indiana American". They had seven children: James, Rachael, Joseph, Samuel, Elizabeth, Mary and John.

He was an Indiana State Representative, 2nd Session as a member of the Whig party. He rose to the position as Speaker of the lower house.

== Death ==
Goudie died on 29 Jul 1836 in Brookville, Indiana. He was interred in the Holiday Cemetery, in Franklin County, Indiana.
