= Clarkson =

Clarkson may refer to:

== People ==
- Clarkson (surname)

=== Given name ===
- Clarkson Nott Potter (1825–1882), American attorney and politician
- Clarkson Frederick Stanfield (1793–1867), English painter

== Places ==
=== Australia ===
- Clarkson, Western Australia
  - Clarkson railway station, a Transperth station in the suburb

=== Canada ===
- Clarkson, Ontario
  - Clarkson GO Station, a station in the GO Transit network located in the community

=== South Africa ===
- Clarkson, Eastern Cape

=== United States ===
- Clarkson, California, a ghost town in California
- Clarkson, Kentucky
- Clarkson, Maryland
- Clarkson, Missouri
- Clarkson, Nebraska
- Clarkson, New York, a town
  - Clarkson (CDP), New York, a census-designated place in the town
- Clarkson, Ohio
- Clarkson, Oklahoma
- Clarkson, Texas

== Education ==
- Clarkson College, Omaha, Nebraska, US
- Clarkson University, Potsdam, New York, US

== Business ==
- Clarkson plc, a shipping services company

== Television ==
- Clarkson (TV series), a British chat show presented by Jeremy Clarkson

== See also ==
- Clarkston (disambiguation)
