= 2026 deaths in the United Kingdom =

List of notable UK deaths in a year

The following notable deaths of British people occurred in 2026. Names are reported under the date of death, in alphabetical order. A typical entry reports information in the following sequence:

- Name, age, citizenship at birth, nationality (in addition to British), or/and home nation, what subject was noted for, birth year, cause of death (if known), and reference.

== January ==
- 1 January
  - Arnold Long, 85, British cricketer (Sussex, MCC, Surrey).
  - Gregory de Polnay, 82, English actor (Dixon of Dock Green, Doctor Who, Howards' Way).
- 2 January
  - Ian Balding, 87, British horse trainer.
  - Jenny Collins, 83, broadcaster and producer (BBC Radio Merseyside). (death announced on this date)
  - Sir Patrick Duffy, 105, British politician, MP (1963–1966, 1970–1992) and president of the NATO Assembly (1988–1990).
  - Tim Robertson, 81, English-born Australian actor (Chances, Australia You're Standing In It, Stingers). (death announced on this date)
- 3 January
  - Gerry Gable, 88, British political activist and magazine editor (Searchlight).
  - Terry Wharton, 83, English footballer (Wolverhampton Wanderers, Bolton Wanderers, Crystal Palace).
- 4 January – Alan Baker, 81, English footballer (Aston Villa). (death announced on this date)
- 5 January
  - Andrew Bodnar, 71, English bass guitarist (The Rumour) and songwriter ("I Love the Sound of Breaking Glass"). (death announced on this date)
  - Andrew Carter, 86, English classical choral composer and pedagogue
  - Colin McDonald, 95, English footballer (Burnley, Headington United, national team). (death announced on this date)
  - Molly Parkin, 93, Welsh painter, novelist and journalist.
  - Ken Wilcock, 91, British sprinter. (death announced on this date)
  - Mike Wilson, 66, British kart racer, six-time Karting World Champion.
- 7 January
  - Martin Chivers, 80, English footballer (Southampton, Tottenham Hotspur, national team).
  - Tony Field, 79, English footballer (Blackburn Rovers, Southport, Memphis Rogues).
- 8 January –
  - Howard Riley, 87, English footballer (Leicester City, Walsall, Barrow).
  - Terry Yorath, 75, Welsh football player (Leeds United, national team) and manager (national team).
- 9 January – Tina Packer, 87, British actress (David Copperfield, Doctor Who) and stage director, co-founder of Shakespeare & Company.
- 10 January – Derek Martin, 92, British actor (Law & Order, Eldorado, EastEnders).
- 11 January
  - Andrew Clements, 75, English classical music critic
  - Robert Hopkins, 64, English footballer (Birmingham City, West Bromwich Albion, Shrewsbury Town).
  - Trevor A. Toussaint, 65, British actor (Hollyoaks).
  - John Wallace, 76, Scottish trumpeter, composer and arts educator.
- 12 January
  - Sheila Bernette, 94, English singer (The Good Old Days, The Black and White Minstrel Show) and actress (The Magnificent Seven Deadly Sins).
  - Matt Kwasniewski-Kelvin, 26, British guitarist (Black Midi). (death announced on this date)
  - Eddie McCreadie, 85, Scottish football player (Chelsea, national team) and manager (Chelsea).
- 13 January
  - David Collier, 70, English sports administrator, chief executive of the England and Wales Cricket Board (2004–2014).
  - David Webb, 60, British-born Hong Kong activist investor, prostate cancer.
- 15 January – Kenny Morris, 68, English drummer (Siouxsie and the Banshees). (death announced on this date)
- 16 January – Mickey Brady, 75, Northern Irish politician, MLA (2007–2015) and MP (2015–2024).
- 18 January
  - David Young, 80, English footballer (Charlton Athletic, Southend United, Newcastle United).
  - David Thomas, 83, British crown jeweller, complications from Alzheimer's disease.
- 20 January – Tommy Wright, 81, English footballer (Everton, national team). (death announced on this date)
- 21 January
  - Stephen Baxter, 56–57, British medieval historian. (death announced on this date)
  - Ian Macowat, 60, English footballer (Crewe Alexandra, Northwich Victoria, Gillingham). (death announced on this date)
  - Peter Squires, 74, English cricketer (Yorkshire) and rugby union player (British & Irish Lions).
- 24 January – David Abulafia, 76, British historian (The Great Sea: A Human History of the Mediterranean).
- 25 January – Sir Mark Tully, 90, British journalist and writer.
- 26 January – Danny Coughlan, British singer and guitarist.
- 27 January
  - David Andrews, 90, British actor and director. (death announced on this date)
  - Joan Hall, 90, British politician, MP (1970–1974).
  - Nigel Ogden, 71, British theatre organist and radio presenter (The Organist Entertains).
- 29 January
  - Peter Lee, 80, English cricketer (Northamptonshire, Lancashire). (death announced on this date)
  - Jim Wallace, Baron Wallace of Tankerness, 71, Scottish politician, acting first minister (2000, 2001) and deputy first minister (1999–2005), complications from surgery.
- 30 January – David Triesman, Baron Triesman, 82, British politician and trade union leader, member of the House of Lords (since 2004).

== February ==
- 1 February
  - Tony Pigott, 67, English cricketer (Sussex, Surrey, national team), heart attack.
  - Sir Nicholas White, 74, British medical doctor and researcher.
- 3 February – Allan Massie, 87, British journalist and author (Augustus, Tiberius, Caesar).
- 4 February – John Virgo, 79, English snooker player, ruptured aorta.
- 5 February – Ken Weetch, 92, British politician, MP (1974–1987).
- 6 February – Mondula, 54, Scotland's only African elephant. (death announced on this date)
- 10 February
  - Des de Moor, 64, English writer and musician. (death announced on this date)
  - Andrew Ranken, 72, English drummer (The Pogues).
- 11 February – Mike Cruise, 78, British astronomer. (death announced on this date)
- 12 February
  - Gordon Brown, 95, English rugby league footballer (Leeds, Great Britain).
  - Palmerston, 11–12, British cat, chief mouser to the Foreign, Commonwealth and Development Office (2016–2020).
- 13 February – Brian Westlake, 82, English footballer (Halifax Town, Colchester United, Tranmere Rovers). (death announced on this date)
- 15 February – Michael Page, 84, English cricketer (Derbyshire). (death announced on this date)
- 16 February – Harry Barnes, 89, English politician, MP (1987–2005), cancer.
- 17 February – Anna dePeyster, 81, British-Australian journalist and author.
- 18 February – Roy Ellam, 83, English footballer (Bradford City, Huddersfield Town, Leeds United). (death announced on this date)
- 19 February – Reliable Man, 17, British Thoroughbred racehorse, euthanised.
- 21 February
  - John Bertalot, 94, English organist.
  - Bill Glen, 93, Scottish rugby union player (national team). (death announced on this date)
- 22 February – Jim Parsons, 82, English rugby union player (Oxford, Northampton, national team).
- 24 February – Jim Donnelly, 79, Scottish snooker player.
- 25 February – Rob Grant, 70, English comedy writer and television producer (Red Dwarf).
- 26 February – Drusilla Beyfus, 98, English writer and journalist (Reading Mercury).
- 27 February – Margaret Farquhar, 95, Scottish politician, lord provost of Aberdeen (1996–1999). (death announced on this date)
- 28 February
  - Paul Conroy, 61, British photojournalist, heart attack.
  - Bernard Lewis, 100, English clothing chain executive, founder and president of River Island.
  - Jack Scarisbrick, 97, British historian and anti-abortion activist.
  - Annabel Schofield, 62, Welsh-born American model and actress (Dallas), brain cancer.

== March ==
- 1 March – Kenith Trodd, 90, British television producer (Pennies from Heaven).
- 2 March
  - Kevin Ashcroft, 81, English rugby player (Leigh, Warrington) and coach (Salford).
  - Len Garry, 84, English musician (The Quarrymen), pneumonia.
  - Douglas Hambidge, 98, British-born Canadian Anglican clergyman, bishop of Caledonia (1969–1980) and New Westminster (1980–1993).
  - Mike Vernon, 81, English record producer ("Albatross", "Hocus Pocus"), music executive and recording studio owner (Chipping Norton Recording Studios).
- 3 March – Andrew Watson, 64, British Anglican clergyman, bishop of Aston (2008–2014) and Guildford (since 2014), member of the House of Lords (since 2022), pancreatic cancer.
- 4 March
  - Ray Glastonbury, 87, Welsh rugby union (Cardiff) and league (Workington Town, national team) player. (death announced on this date)
  - Bernard Rands, 92, British-American composer.
  - Chris Wheeler, 52, English chef.
- 5 March –
  - Bobby Cummines, 74, English gangster.
  - David Wilde, 75, English cricketer (Derbyshire). (death announced on this date)
- 6 March – Eigra Lewis Roberts, 86, Welsh writer, playwright and poet. (death announced on this date)
- 7 March
  - Ian Huntley, 52, British murderer (Soham Murders), head trauma from an attack.
  - Matt Salter, 49, English rugby union (Bristol) and rugby league (London Broncos) player.
- 8 March
  - Matt Gallagher, English rugby union player (Coventry R.F.C.), motor neurone disease.
  - Sir Anthony James Leggett, 87, British-American theoretical physicist, Nobel Prize laureate (2003).
- 9 March – Zeph Ellis, 37, British rapper. (death announced on this date)
- 10 March
  - Susan Haack, 80, British philosopher.
  - Lloyd Jones, 74, Welsh novelist.
- 12 March
  - John Fisher Burns, 81, British journalist (The New York Times), pneumonia.
  - Dame Jenni Murray, 75, English journalist and broadcaster (Woman's Hour).
- 13 March
  - John Alford, 54, British actor (Grange Hill, London's Burning) and convicted sex offender.
  - Billy Campbell, 81, footballer (Dundee, Motherwell, national team). (death reported on this date)
  - Phil Campbell, 64, Welsh guitarist (Motörhead, Persian Risk, Phil Campbell and the Bastard Sons).
  - Amy Carr, 34, English footballer (Reading, Northern Illinois Huskies, IL Sandviken), brain tumour.
  - Billy McCullough, 90, footballer (Arsenal, Millwall, national team). (death reported on this date)
- 14 March
  - Gordon Wallace, 82, Scottish football player (Dundee, Montrose) and manager (Raith Rovers). (death announced on this date)
  - Phil Woolas, 66, British politician, MP (1997–2010), brain cancer.
- 15 March
  - Len Deighton, 97, British spy novelist and illustrator (The IPCRESS File, An Expensive Place to Die, XPD).
  - Jim Fleeting, 70, Scottish football player (Ayr United, Clyde) and manager (Kilmarnock).
  - James M. Houston, 103, British-born Canadian theologian.
- 17 March – Tony Bracegirdle, 83, British rose breeder and horticulturist. (death announced on this date)
- 18 March – Tom Georgeson, 89, British actor (A Fish Called Wanda, Boys from the Blackstuff, G.B.H.).
- 20 March
  - Ted Booth, 87, British poet. (death announced on this date)
  - Robert Fox, 73, English film and television producer (The Hours, The Crown, Iris). (death announced on this date)
  - Christine McCartney, 79, British microbiologist. (death announced on this date)
  - Richard Phillips, 85, British music promoter. (death announced on this date)
  - Tessa Richards, 75, British physician. (death announced on this date)
- 21 March – Jeff Smith, 91, English Hall of Fame motorcycle racer (Motocross World Championship).
- 23 March – Peter Stead, 83, writer and broadcaster
- 25 March
  - Harold Ellis, 100, English surgeon.
  - Mick Roberts, 57, English singer (The Bridewell Taxis).
  - David Winnick, 92, British politician, MP (1966–1970, 1979–2017).
  - Sheila Tomlinson, 100, British film editor (Juliet Bravo, Blake's 7, Doctor Who).
  - Burnell Tucker, 91, Canadian actor (Doctor Who, Star Wars, 2001: A Space Odyssey).
- 26 March – Desmond Barrit, 81, Welsh actor. (death announced on this date)
- 27 March
  - Alex Cropley, 75, English-Scottish footballer (Hibernian, Aston Villa, Scotland national team). (death announced on this date)
  - Richard Meier, 55, British poet. (death announced on this date)
  - Mary Rand, 86, British track and field athlete, Olympic champion (1964).
  - Geoff Vowden, 84, English footballer (Birmingham City, Aston Villa, Nottingham Forest). (death announced on this date)
- 29 March
  - Glen Baxter, 82, English artist, carcinomatosis.
  - Ben Stevenson, 89, British ballet dancer and teacher.
  - Laurie Webb, 101, Welsh actor (Doomwatch, Paul Temple, Doctor Who).
- 30 March
  - Tony Godden, 70, English footballer (Chelsea, Peterborough United, West Bromwich Albion). (death announced on this date)
  - Christopher Haskins, 88, Irish-born businessman and life peer, member of the House of Lords (1998–2020). (death announced on this date)
  - James Stannage, 76, British radio talk show host, cancer.
- 31 March – Tony Rivers, 85, English singer (Harmony Grass).

== April ==
- 1 April – Mike Chaplin, 82, British artist, mesothelioma.
- 2 April – Nick Savva, 91, Cypriot-born British greyhound trainer and breeder.
- 5 April
  - Tim Slessor, 95, British documentarian.
  - David Wiffen, 84, English–Canadian folk singer-songwriter (Driving Wheel).
- 6 April
  - Angela Pleasence, 84, English actress (Hitler: The Last Ten Days, Coronation Street, Doctor Who).
  - Nick Pope, 60, British-born journalist and television personality (Ancient Aliens, UFOs Declassified, Britain’s Closest Encounters), esophageal cancer.
  - Sir Craig Reedie, 84, Scottish sports administrator, president of WADA (2014–2019), vice-president of the IOC (2012–2016), and chairman of the British Olympic Association (1992–2005). (death announced on this date)
- 7 April – Dame Averil Cameron, 86, British historian.
- 8 April
  - Doug Allan, 74, Scottish wildlife photographer and cameraman.
  - Brian Garvey, 88, English footballer (Hull City, Watford, Colchester United). (death announced on this date)
- 9 April
  - Jeremy Beecham, Baron Beecham, 81, British politician, member of the House of Lords (2010–2021), complications from Alzheimer's disease.
  - Eirwyn George, 89, Welsh poet.
- 10 April
  - Brian Rotman, 87, British academic. (death announced on this date)
- 11 April
  - John Dalgleish Donaldson, 84, Scottish-Australian mathematician.
  - John Nolan, 87, British actor (Person of Interest, Terror, Batman Begins).
  - Mike Westbrook, 90, English jazz pianist and composer.
- 13 April
  - Henry Newton, 82, English footballer (Nottingham Forest, Derby County).
  - Nicky Smith, 57, English football player (Colchester United, Braintree Town) and manager (AFC Sudbury). (death announced on this date)
  - Ian Watson, 82, British science fiction author (The Jonah Kit, Chekhov's Journey, Queenmagic, Kingmagic).
- 14 April – Alexander Morton, 81, Scottish actor (Monarch of the Glen, Take the High Road, Taggart).
- 16 April
  - Tony Clarke, Baron Clarke of Stone-cum-Ebony, 82, British lawyer, judge and life peer, member of the House of Lords (2009–2020).
  - Andy Kershaw, 66, English broadcaster and radio DJ (BBC Radio 1), cancer.
  - Billy Knight, 90, British tennis player.
- 17 April – Finnian Garbutt, 28, British actor (Hope Street), skin cancer.
- 18 April – Gordon Livsey, 79, English footballer (Wrexham, Chester, Hartlepool United). (death announced on this date)
- 19 April
  - Ben Bartlett, 61, British composer, lung cancer.
  - Dave Mason, 79, English Hall of Fame musician (Traffic) and songwriter ("Hole in My Shoe", "Feelin' Alright?").
  - Desmond Morris, 98, English zoologist (The Naked Ape), ethnologist and surrealist painter.
- 20 April – Julian Hunt, Baron Hunt of Chesterton, 84, British meteorologist and life peer, member of the House of Lords (2000–2021), vascular dementia.
- 21 April
  - Robin Vanden-Bempde-Johnstone, 5th Baron Derwent, 95, British hereditary peer, member of the House of Lords (1986–1999).
  - Elsie Kelly, 89, English actress (Benidorm, The Famous Five, Crossroads).
  - Barrie Tomlinson, 88, British comic book editor and writer (Roy of the Rovers, Speed, Wildcat).
- 22 April
  - Peter J. Carroll, 72–73, British occultist and writer.
  - Kathy Dooley, 70, British singer (The Dooleys), dementia.
  - Allan Hosie, 80, Scottish rugby referee.
  - Tony Parkes, 76, English football player (Buxton, Blackburn Rovers) and manager (Blackburn Rovers), complications from Alzheimer's disease.
  - J. H. Prynne, 89, British poet.
- 23 April
  - George Ley, 80, English footballer (Portsmouth, Dallas Tornado, Exeter City). (death announced on this date)
  - Josh Mauro, 35, English-born American football player (Arizona Cardinals, New York Giants, Jacksonville Jaguars).
- 24 April –
  - Bill Ind, 84, English Anglican bishop, bishop of Truro (1997–2008). (death announced on this date)
  - Quintin Young, 78, Scottish footballer (Rangers, Ayr United, East Fife). (death announced on this date)
- 25 April – Klaudia Zakrzewska, 32, British social media influencer, traffic collision.
- 26 April –
  - Nigel Dunnett, 63, British horticulturalist and academic.
  - Michael Keating, 79, actor (EastEnders, Blake's 7, Doctor Who).
- 27 April – Beverley Martyn, 79, British singer-songwriter.
- 28 April – George Dunn, 103, British air force officer.
- 29 April
  - Richard Harries, Baron Harries of Pentregarth, 89, British Anglican clergyman and life peer, bishop of Oxford (1987–2006) and member of the House of Lords (since 2006).
  - Donald MacRae, 84, Scottish folk singer.
  - Gordon Snell, 93, British children’s author. (death announced on this date)
- 30 April – Alex Ligertwood, 79, Scottish musician and singer (Santana).
- April – Jill Curzon, 87, English actress (Daleks' Invasion Earth 2150 A.D.).

== May ==
- 3 May – Joyce Hawkins, 95, costume designer (Doctor Who, Vanity Fair, The Hound of the Baskervilles).
- 4 May – Dame Shirley Porter, 95, British politician, leader of the Westminster City Council (1983–1991) and lord mayor of Westminster (1991–1992). (death announced on this date)
- 6 May – Jesse Hector, 78, English musician (The Gorillas).
- 7 May – Jake Hall, 35, actor, model and reality television star (The Only Way is Essex), head injury. (death reported on this date)
- 8 May – Michael Pennington, 82, English actor (Return of the Jedi, The Iron Lady), co-founder of the English Shakespeare Company and writer.
- 9 May – Michael Sefi, 82, British philatelist.
- 10 May
  - David Burke, 91, British actor (Sherlock Holmes, Reilly, Ace of Spies, The Love School).
  - Ralph Ottey, 102, Jamaican-born British author and World War II veteran.
- 13 May – Peter Simpson, 81, English footballer (Arsenal). (death announced on this date)
- 14 May
  - Caroline Jones, 71, Welsh politician, MS (2016–2021), sepsis.
  - Alan Rothwell, 89, English actor (Coronation Street, Brookside, Heartbeat) and television presenter.
  - John Bryan Taylor, 97, British physicist.
- 15 May
  - Dame Felicity Lott, 79, English soprano, cancer.
  - Jimmy Mann, 73, English footballer (Bristol City, Barnsley, Doncaster Rovers). (death announced on this date)
- 17 May
  - Peter Checkland, 95, British management scientist and academic.
  - Scott Hastings, 61, Scottish rugby union player (Watsonians, Edinburgh, national team), non-Hodgkin lymphoma.
  - M. J. K. Smith, 92, English cricketer (Leicestershire, Warwickshire, national team).
- 18 May
  - Jim Irvine, 85, Scottish footballer (Dundee United, Middlesbrough, Barrow). (death announced on this date)
  - Patrick Sookhdeo, 79, British activist, founder and director of Barnabas Aid (1993–2015).
- 19 May – John Middleton, 70, English footballer (Bradford City, Macclesfield Town). (death announced on this date)
- 20 May
  - Bill Albury, 92, English footballer (Portsmouth, Gillingham, Yeovil Town).
  - Mike Galloway, 60, English-born Scottish football player (Halifax Town, Celtic, national team) and coach. (death announced on this date)
  - Arthur Lewis, 84, Welsh rugby union player (Ebbw Vale, British Lions, national team). (death announced on this date)
- 21 May
  - Matthew Biggs, 65, British radio personality (Gardeners' Question Time), bowel cancer.
  - Judith Chalmers, 90, English television presenter (Wish You Were Here...?).
- 22 May
  - Sir Jeremy Hanley, 80, British politician, MP (1983–1997).
  - Dick Parry, 83, English saxophonist (Pink Floyd).
- 23 May
  - Brian Large, 87, English opera director.
  - Trevor Meath, 82, English footballer (Walsall, Lincoln City). (death announced on this date)
- 24 May
  - Frank McGuigan, 70, Northern Irish Gaelic footballer (Tyrone).
  - Betty Roe, 95, English composer, singer and vocal coach. (death announced on this date)
- 25 May – Flick Rea, 88, English Liberal Democrat politician, Camden Borough councillor (1986–2021).
- 26 May –
  - John Bradburn, 80, English floor manager (Doctor Who, The Ray Bradbury Theatre, The Return of Sherlock Holmes), production assistant (Doctor Who, Grange Hill, Angels) and actor (Doctor Who).
  - Linda Mullins, 86, English greyhound racing trainer. (death announced on this date)
- 27 May
  - Owain Rhys Davies, 44, Welsh actor (Twin Peaks, Alice Through the Looking Glass, A Serial Killer's Guide to Life)
  - Maureen Duffy, 92, English poet, playwright and novelist.
  - Daniel Ingham, 33, British motorcycle racer (Isle of Man TT), accident in qualifying.
- 28 May
  - Alec Penstone, 101, British World War II veteran.
  - Meta Ramsay, Baroness Ramsay of Cartvale, 89, Scottish intelligence officer and peer, member of the House of Lords (since 1996).
- 29 May
  - Lauren Bennett, 36, English singer (G.R.L., "Party Rock Anthem").
  - Caroline Marland, 80, British advertiser and newspaper managing director (The Guardian), traffic collision. (death announced on this date)
  - Geoff Keating, 88, British musician (The Master Singers). (death announced on this date)
  - Doug Shaw, 42, British musician (Gang Gang Dance, White Magic). (death announced on this date)
- 30 May – Steve Barrow, 80, British reggae producer and historiographer, co-founder of Blood and Fire. (death announced on this date)
- 31 May
  - John Kear, 71, English rugby league coach (Sheffield Eagles, Wakefield Trinity, Welsh national team).
  - Matthew Spender, 81, English sculptor and writer. (death announced on this date)

== June ==
- 1 June
  - John Blanche, 77, British fantasy and science fiction illustrator (White Dwarf, Warhammer 40,000).
  - Alan Haselhurst, Baron Haselhurst, 88, British politician, MP (1970–1974, 1977–2017) and member of the House of Lords (2018–2024).
  - Anthony Head, 72, English actor (Buffy the Vampire Slayer, Merlin, Ted Lasso), complications from pneumonia.
  - Michael Meadowcroft, 84, English politician, MP (1983–1987).
  - Sir Angus Stirling, 92, British arts administrator and conservationist.
- 2 June – Sir Alex Younger, 62, British intelligence officer, chief of the Secret Intelligence Service (2014–2020), pancreatic cancer.
- 3 June
  - Kanya King, 57, British businesswoman, founder of the MOBO Awards, colon cancer.
  - Bobby Tambling, 84, English football player (Chelsea, Crystal Palace, national team) and manager.
- 4 June
  - Norman Balon, 99, British publican.
  - Aaron Cook, 46, Welsh footballer (Salisbury City, Gosport Borough, Bemerton Heath Harlequins). (death announced on this date)
  - Patrick Godfrey, 93, English actor (Maurice, The Count of Monte Cristo, Ever After).
  - Ian Hampton, 79, Scottish bassist (Sparks).
  - Sheila Mitchell, 100, British actress (Lillie, Z-Cars, Grange Hill) and author.
- 5 June
  - Lady Pamela Hicks, 97, British aristocrat.
  - Olufemi Majekodunmi, 86, British-Nigerian architect.
  - Talay Riley, 35, British singer ("Make You Mine") and songwriter ("Young Dumb & Broke", "Bounce"), stabbed.
- 6 June
  - Andrew Morgan, 92, British Olympic cross-country skier (1956, 1960, 1964).
  - Alan Riding, 82, British journalist (The New York Times), cancer.
- 9 June
  - Keith Piper, 56, English cricketer (Warwickshire), cancer.
  - Bruno Turner, 95, British musicologist.
- 11 June
  - Philip Adrian Booth, 66, British-Canadian guitarist and keyboardist ("Ulterior Motives"). (death announced on this date)
  - Nigel Cabourn, 76, English fashion designer, cancer.
  - David Hockney, 88, English painter (A Bigger Splash, Mr and Mrs Clark and Percy, The Blue Guitar), draughtsman and printmaker.
  - Kenny Jackett, 64, English-born Welsh football player (Watford, Wales national team) and manager (Millwall).
- 12 June
  - David Gamble, 70, British film editor (Shakespeare in Love, Veronica Guerin, Shopgirl). (death announced on this date)
  - Mary Hooper, 81, British author. (death announced on this date)
- 13 June
  - Roy Hattersley, 93, British politician, MP (1964–1997) and member of the House of Lords (1997–2017).
  - Peter Heppelthwaite, 58–59, British actor (The Green Green Grass).
  - Rosamond McKitterick, 77, British medieval historian.
  - Dee Palmer, 88, English musician (Jethro Tull), arranger, and composer.
- 14 June
  - Dave Greenslade, 83, English composer and keyboardist (Colosseum, Greenslade, If). (death announced on this date)
  - Max Wideman, 99, Welsh-Canadian engineer.
- 15 June
  - Trevor Hitchen, 99, English footballer (Southport, Wigan Athletic, Oldham Athletic).
  - Brian Johnson, 86, British special effects film artist (The Empire Strikes Back, Alien, The NeverEnding Story), Oscar winner (1980, 1981). (death announced on this date)
  - Peter Littlewood, 71, British physicist.
  - Alan Ward, 78, English cricketer (Derbyshire, Border, Leicestershire).
- 16 June – John Savile, 8th Earl of Mexborough, 95, British hereditary peer.
- 17 June
  - Teddie Beverley, 99, English singer (The Beverley Sisters).
  - Bobby Harrison, 95, English footballer (Carlisle United, Stockport County, Mossley). (death announced on this date).
  - Major Oak, c. 800–1000, English oak (Quercus robur). (death announced on this date)
- 19 June – Guy Edwards, 83, British racing driver (Formula One).
- 20 June – Alex Hughes, 38, Welsh football player (Stockport County, Wrexham) and coach. (death announced on this date)
- 21 June – Alan Murray, 76, English football player (Doncaster Rovers) and manager (Hartlepool United, Darlington). (death announced on this date)
- 22 June – John Dewar, 4th Baron Forteviot, 88, British hereditary peer, member of the House of Lords (1994–1999).
- 24 June
  - David Clayton-Thomas, 84, British-Canadian singer (Blood, Sweat & Tears) and songwriter ("Spinning Wheel").
  - Sir Roy Goode, 93, English lawyer.
  - Herbie Williams, 85, Welsh footballer (Swansea City, national team). (death announced on this date)
- 26 June – David Hencke, 79, British investigative journalist (The Guardian), liver cancer.
- 28 June – Justin Richards, 64, British writer (Doctor Who, The Invisible Detective).
- 29 June – Dame Penelope Keith, 86, English actress (The Good Life, To the Manor Born, Executive Stress), cancer. (death announced on this date)
- 30 June
  - Humphrey Smith (businessman), 81, brewer. (death reported on this date)
  - Sir Neville Trotter, 94, British politician, MP (1974–1997). (death announced on this date)

== July ==
- 1 July
  - Vladimir McTavish, 70, Scottish comedian.
  - Brian Potter, 86–87, British-born American songwriter and record producer. (death announced on this date)
- 2 July
  - Graham Bradley, 65, British National Hunt jockey, semantic dementia.
  - Paul Dobson, 63, English footballer (Hartlepool United, Torquay United, Scarborough). (death announced on this date)
- 3 July
  - Alan Banks, 87, English footballer (Liverpool, Exeter City, Plymouth Argyle).
  - Trevor Fishlock, 85, British journalist (The Times, The Daily Telegraph).
  - Peter Higham, 95, English footballer (Wigan Athletic, Nottingham Forest, Buxton).
  - Motivator, 24, British Thoroughbred racehorse and sire, heart attack.
- 5 July
  - Beaky, 81, English musician (Dave Dee, Dozy, Beaky, Mick & Tich). (death announced on this date)
  - Christian Moran, 42, English-Korean drummer.
- 6 July – Sir George Howarth, 77, British politician, MP (1986–2024). (death announced on this date)
- 7 July –
  - James Mackay, Baron Mackay of Clashfern, 99, Scottish lawyer and life peer, Lord Advocate (1979–1984), Lord Clerk Register (2007–2022), and member of the House of Lords (1979–2022).
  - Joanna Pettet, 83, English actress (Casino Royale, The Night of the Generals, The Evil).
  - Tony Rayns, 77, British writer and film commentator, fall.
  - Tom Sweenie, 80, Scottish footballer (Leicester City, York City).
  - William Taylor, 69, English Anglican clergyman, dean of Portsmouth Cathedral (2000–2002).
- 8 July
  - Theo Burrell, 39, British antiques expert, glioblastoma.
  - Bonnie Tyler, 75, Welsh singer and songwriter.
- 9 July – Calvin Hayes, 63, British musician (Johnny Hates Jazz).
- 10 July
  - Michael Aspinall, 86, British musicologist.
  - Patricia Greene, 95, English actress (The Archers). (death announced on this date)
  - Mike Larnach, 73, Scottish footballer (Clydebank, Motherwell, Ayr United).
  - Ann Widdecombe, 78, British politician and television personality, MP (1987–2010), suspected murder. (death announced on this date)
- 11 July – Dermot Murnaghan, 68, English journalist, news reporter and television host, prostate cancer.
- 12 July – David Willey, 93, British journalist (BBC, Reuters), heart failure.
- 13 July
  - John Berne, 72, Northern Irish-born Australian rugby league (South Sydney Rabbitohs, Cronulla-Sutherland Sharks) and union (national team) player, complications from dementia.
  - Sir Sam Neill, 78, Northern Irish-born New Zealand actor (Jurassic Park, The Piano, Event Horizon), pneumonia.
- 14 July – Dave Kendall, 63, British television personality (120 Minutes), disc jockey (SiriusXM), and journalist. (death announced on this date)
- 15 July – Herbert Laming, Baron Laming, 89, British social worker and life peer, member of the House of Lords (since 1998).
- 18 July
  - Tom Chadbon, 80, English actor (Doctor Who, Tess, Casino Royale).
  - Terence Donovan, 90, British-Australian actor (Home and Away, Neighbours, Breaker Morant).
  - Edward Stourton, 68, British broadcaster and presenter (Sunday, Today), prostate cancer.
  - Tony Thorpe, 80, English guitarist and singer (The Rubettes). (death announced on this date)
- 20 July
  - Kevin Keegan, 75, English footballer (Liverpool, national team) and manager (national team), cancer. (death announced on this date)
  - Edwin Smith, 92, English cricketer (Derbyshire). (death announced on this date)
- 22 July
  - Frank Barrow, 83, English rugby league player (St Helens, Leigh) and coach (Swinton).
  - David Douglas, 12th Marquess of Queensberry, 96, British aristocrat and pottery designer.
  - Paddy McNally, 88, British businessman and racing driver.
- 23 July
  - Annie Courtney, Northern Irish politician, member of the Derry City Council (1985–2005) and MLA (2000–2003).
  - Asteryth Sloane, 26, British composer and poet. (death announced on this date)
- 24 July – Fred Kemp, 80, English footballer (Halifax Town, Southampton, Blackpool). (death announced on this date)
- 25 July
  - John Horam, Baron Horam, 87, British politician, MP (1970–1983, 1992–2010) and member of the House of Lords (since 2013), complications from a fall. (death announced on this date)
  - Michael McNay, 91, British journalist (The Guardian) and author.
  - Bill Oddie, 85, English wildlife presenter (Springwatch, Birding with Bill Oddie) and comedian (The Goodies).
- 26 July
  - Gerry Kelly, 77, Northern Irish broadcaster (Kelly).
  - Sir Ian Wood, 84, Scottish engineering and consulting executive, founder of the Wood Group.
- 27 July
  - Phyllida Law, 94, Scottish actress (Kingdom, Much Ado About Nothing, Peter's Friends).
  - Kevin Sinnott, 78, painter.
  - Ronnie Le Drew, 78, puppeteer and voice of Zippy from Rainbow.
- 28 July – Mike Smedley, 84, English cricketer (Nottinghamshire).
- 31 July – Glyn Lewis, 53, Welsh continuity announcer (BBC One Wales, BBC Two Wales). (death announced on this date)

== August ==
- 2 August
  - Paul Bradshaw, 72, English footballer (Burnley, Sheffield Wednesday).
  - Rod Liddle, 66, British journalist (Today, The Spectator) and broadcaster.
- 3 August
  - Robin Cowling, 82, English rugby union player (Gloucester, Leicester Tigers, national team). (death announced on this date)
  - Jimmy Cricket, 80, Northern Irish comedian and television host (And There's More).
  - John Douglas, 63, Scottish musician (Trashcan Sinatras) and songwriter ("Obscurity Knocks", "Only Tongue Can Tell").
  - Peter Gill, 86, Welsh director, playwright and actor (The York Realist, Versailles).
  - Sir Anthony Kenny, 95, British philosopher.
  - Robin Middleton, 94, British architectural historian.
- 5 August – Jean Lodge, 99, British actress (Death of an Angel, Brandy for the Parson, Glad Tidings).
- 6 August – Matthew Jukes, 58, British wine writer.
- 8 August – Phil Parkes, 79, English footballer (Wolverhampton Wanderers, Vancouver Whitecaps, Chicago Sting).
- 9 August
  - Gary Dwyer, British drummer (The Teardrop Explodes, The Colourfield), leukaemia.
  - Arthur Price, 80, British motorcycle speedway rider (King's Lynn Stars, Cradley Heathens, England national team). (death announced on this date)
- 10 August – Jean Paton, 97, British botanist and bryologist.
- 11 August
  - Steve Barwick, 65, Welsh cricketer (Glamorgan, Wales Minor Counties).
  - Jill Gomez, 83, Trinidadian-British soprano.
  - Sheila Mathews, 99, English actress, singer and dancer.
- 12 August – Cheryl Hall, 75–76, English actress (Doctor Who, EastEnders, The Bill). (death announced on this date)
- 13 August –
  - Derry Brownson, 55, English musician (EMF), brain tumour.
  - Jack Crabtree, 87, English painter and teacher. (death announced on this date)
- 14 August
  - Jason Arday, 41, academic and author (Great and Unfortunate Things).
  - Jimmy Rimmer, 78, English footballer (Arsenal, Aston Villa, national team).
  - Eddie Richardson, 90, English gangster (Richardson Gang).
  - Peter Snape, Baron Snape, 84, British politician, MP (1974–2001) and member of the House of Lords (since 2004). (death announced on this date)
  - Finlay Tarling, 19, Welsh racing cyclist, traffic collision.
- 15 August – Patricia Baird, 88, British-born Canadian medical geneticist. (death announced on this date)
- 16 August – Wally Sykes, 83, British Olympic sports shooter (1984). (death announced on this date)
- 17 August – Mike Bailey, 84, English footballer (Charlton Athletic, Wolverhampton Wanderers, national team), complications from dementia.
- 18 August – P. E. Easterling, 92, English classical scholar.
- 20 August
  - Terry Dyson, 91, English footballer (Tottenham Hotspur, Colchester United, Guildford City). (death announced on this date)
  - Wilem Frischmann, 95, British structural engineer (Centre Point, Tower 42, Drapers Gardens). (death announced on this date)
- 21 August – Caroline Langford, 68, British-born Israeli actress.
- 22 August – Bobby Ross, 84, Scottish football player (Brentford, Shrewsbury Town) and coach (Hayes). (death announced on this date)
- 23 August – Harry Bramma, 89, British organist and composer.
- 24 August
  - Sir Billy Boston, 92, Cardiff-born rugby league player for Wigan and Great Britain.
  - Jo Gardiner, 61, reality show contestant (Race Across the World). (death reported on this date)
  - Gathorne Gathorne-Hardy, 5th Earl of Cranbrook, 93, British zoologist and peer, member of the House of Lords (1978–1999).
  - Maurice Herriott, 86, British steeplechase runner, Olympic silver medallist (1964).
- 25 August – Tim Curry, 80, English actor (The Rocky Horror Picture Show, Annie, It) and singer.
- 26 August – Donna Brand, 47, convicted murderer.
- 27 August – Terry Matthews, 90, English footballer (Aldershot, Gillingham, West Ham United). (death announced on this date)
- 28 August – John Walker, 82–83, English cinematographer (Bergerac). (death announced on this date)
- 29 August – Helch, 34, British graffiti artist. (death announced on this date)

== September ==
- 1 September – Alan Knight, 65, English footballer (Portsmouth) and coach (Horndean, Dorchester Town), prostate cancer.
- 2 September
  - Jimmy Batten, 70, English boxer, complications from Parkinson’s disease. (death announced on this date)
  - Hugh Curran, 82, Scottish footballer (Norwich City, Wolverhampton, national team).
  - Peter Leaver, 81, British barrister and judge.
  - David McDermott, 38, English footballer (Walsall, Kidderminster Harriers, York City). (death announced on this date)
- 4 September
  - Craig Douglas, 85, English singer.
  - Francis Grosvenor, 8th Earl of Wilton, 92, British-Australian aristocrat.
  - Richard O'Sullivan, 82, English actor (Man About the House, Robin's Nest, Dick Turpin).
- 5 September – Shirley Strum Kenny, 92, English scholar and university president.
- 6 September –
  - Bill Dundee, 82, Scottish professional wrestler (AWA, NWA, WCW).
  - Stephen Walker, 61, English-born Northern Irish journalist and author (BBC Northern Ireland). (death announced on this date)
- 7 September
  - Sir Richard Alston, 77, British choreographer.
  - Tony Buss, 87, English cricketer (Sussex).
  - Sir Roger Jones, 83, Welsh pharmaceutical executive and researcher.
- 8 September – Harry Burrows, 85, English footballer (Aston Villa, Stoke City, Plymouth Argyle).
- 9 September – June Wyndham Davies, 97, British television producer and director.
- 10 September
  - Malcolm Dawes, 82, English footballer (Hartlepool, Aldershot, Workington), complications from dementia. (death announced on this date)
  - Felicity Green, 100, British fashion journalist and newspaper executive.
  - Ken Todd, 69, English footballer (Wolverhampton Wanderers, Port Vale, Portsmouth). (death announced on this date)
- 11 September –
  - Harry Kirk, 82, Scottish footballer (Scunthorpe United, Stockport County, Darlington).
  - Jeremy Thomas, 77, British film producer (The Last Emperor, Sexy Beast, Naked Lunch), Oscar winner (1988).
- 13 September – Ian Berry, 92, English photojournalist.
- 14 September – Sheila Kennelly, 88, British-born Australian actress (Number 96, Kingswood Country, Home and Away).
- 15 September
  - John Delaney, 84, English footballer (Wycombe Wanderers F.C., Bournemouth, national amateur team).
  - Bonnie Greer, 77, American-born British-American African American writer, journalist and political commentator. (death announced on this date)
  - Kevin Miller, 57, English football player (Exeter City, Watford, Crystal Palace) and coach.
  - Ben Saunders, 43, English-born Dutch singer (Follow That Dream).
- 17 September – Sway, 44, British rapper. (death announced on this date)
- 18 September
  - Stephanie Cole, 84, English actress (Open All Hours, Doc Martin, Coronation Street), complications from Alzheimer's disease.
  - Colin Powers, 70, British boxer, cancer. (death announced on this date)
  - Jimmy Revie, 79, British boxer, complications from dementia. (death announced on this date)
- 19 September
  - Willie Callaghan, 83, Scottish footballer (Dunfermline Athletic, Berwick Rangers, Cowdenbeath).
  - Paul Lloyd, 57, English boxer. (death announced on this date)
  - Keith Wakefield, 78, English politician, leader of Leeds City Council (2003–2004, 2010–2015).
- 20 September – Kenneth Hay, 101, British World War II veteran. (death announced on this date)
- 21 September
  - Andrew Strathern, 87, British anthropologist. (death announced on this date)
  - Terry Harryman, 87, British rally co-driver.
- 22 September – Mark Doyle, 67, British journalist (BBC News). (death announced on this date)
- 23 September
  - Paul Butler, Northern Irish politician, MLA (2007–2011).
  - Cyril Hilsum, 101, British physicist and academic.
- 26 September – Tony Currie, 74, Scottish broadcaster (Radio Clyde), tonsil cancer.
- 27 September
  - Ronnie Golden, British singer (The Fabulous Poodles) and comedian, heart attack. (death announced on this date)
  - Pac, 40, English professional wrestler (AEW, WWE, Dragongate).
  - Ken Taylor, 91, English cricketer (Yorkshire, England) and footballer (Huddersfield Town).
- 28 September
  - Bob Davenport, 94, English traditional folk singer. (death announced on this date)
  - Michael Wynn-Jones, 85, Welsh writer, editor and publisher.
- 29 September – Courtney Meppen-Walter, 32, English footballer (Glossop North End, Chorley, Bury).
- 30 September – Dame Esther Rantzen, 86, British journalist, television presenter (That's Life!), campaigner and charity founder (Childline, The Silver Line), lung cancer.

== October ==
- 2 October
  - Ray Close, 57, Northern Irish boxer. (death announced on this date)
  - Geoff Hickson, 87, English footballer (Crewe Alexandra, Stoke City). (death announced on this date)
- 3 October – Hugh Wooldridge, 74, English theatre director, producer and writer.
- 4 October – Dean Hawkes, 87–88, British designer, architect and academic.
- 5 October
  - Jeffrey Archer, Baron Archer of Weston-super-Mare, 86, British politician and author (Kane and Abel, Only Time Will Tell, A Prison Diary), MP (1969–1974) and member of the House of Lords (1992–2024).
  - George Fenton, 76, English film and television composer (Gandhi, The Fisher King, Planet Earth).
  - Lena Martell, 86, Scottish singer ("One Day at a Time"). (death announced on this date)
- 6 October – Paul Ferris, 62, Scottish writer and organised crime figure.
- 9 October
  - Les Latcham, 83, English footballer (Burnley, Plymouth Argyle, Bradford City). (death announced on this date)
  - Alan Thornett, 89, British activist and car worker.
  - Chris Wickham, 76, British historian (Framing the Early Middle Ages, The Inheritance of Rome) and academic.
  - James Lindesay-Bethune, 16th Earl of Lindsay, 70, Scottish hereditary peer, businessman and politician, member of the House of Lords (1989–2026).
- 10 October
  - Freddie Foreman, 94, English gangster (Kray twins).
  - Sir Donald Insall, 100, British architect (Donald Insall Associates), conservationist and author.
- 12 October
  - Brian Jones, 85, English saxophonist (The Undertakers).
  - Doug Loft, 39, English footballer (Port Vale, Gillingham, Brighton & Hove Albion). (death announced on this date)
  - John Mocatta, 90, English cricketer (Oxford University).
  - Henry Rice, 100, World War II veteran. (death announced on this date)
- 13 October
  - Ken Friar, 92, English football executive, president of Arsenal F.C. (since 2020).
  - Pat Karney, 78, Irish-born British politician.
- 16 October
  - Alan Brown, 90, English cricketer (Kent, national team). (death announced on this date)
  - Douglas Dunn, 83, Scottish poet, academic and critic.
- 18 October – Ronald Lancaster, 95, British Anglican clergyman, chemist and businessman, founder of Kimbolton Fireworks.
- 19 October – Andy King, 78, British politician, MP (1997–2005). (death announced on this date)
- 22 October – John Vaughan, 62, English football player (Cambridge United, Preston North End) and coach (Bradford City).
- 23 October – Lorn Cowie, Lord Cowie, 100, Scottish rugby union player (West of Scotland, national team) and jurist, senator of the College of Justice (1977–1994).
- 24 October
  - Nigel Durham, 61, British drummer (Saxon). (death announced on this date)
  - Barry Murphy, 86, English footballer (Barnsley, South Shields). (death announced on this date)
  - Pauline Parker, 88, New Zealand convicted murderer (Parker–Hulme murder case). (death reported on this date)
- 27 October
  - Peter Dobing, 87, English footballer (Stoke City, Blackburn Rovers, Manchester City). (death announced on this date)
  - Phil McDonald, English audio engineer. (death announced on this date)
- 28 October
  - Sir Patrick Stewart, 86, English actor (Star Trek: The Next Generation).
- 29 October
  - Sanda Kerr, 84, English folk singer and musician (Bagpuss).

== November ==
- 1 November
  - John Leeson, 83, English actor and voice of K-9 (Doctor Who, Rainbow, The Sarah Jane Adventures).
- 3 November
  - John Frieda, 75, British celebrity hairstylist.
