= 2026 in British music =

This is a summary of the year 2026 in British music.

== Events ==
=== January ===
- 1 January – Radio X listeners vote the Wolf Alice single "The Sofa" as their Record of the Year for 2025 in the station's annual poll of music for the year.
- 7 January
  - Aurora Orchestra announces that John Harte would depart as its chief executive in July 2026.
  - The London Symphony Orchestra announces the appointment of John Harte as its next managing director, effective August 2026.
- 9 January – Skye Newman is named as the BBC Sound of 2026.
- 12 January – The Orchestra of the Swan announces the appointment of Zoë Curnow as its next executive director, effective 1 April 2026.
- 19 January – Scottish singer-songwriter Jacob Alon is named as the winner of the 2026 Brits Critics' Choice Award.
- 23 January – Robbie Williams' album, Britpop, reaches number one in the UK Albums Chart, marking his sixteenth number one and surpassing a record previously held by The Beatles.
- 30 January – The Molotovs release their debut album Wasted on Youth.

=== February ===
- 13 February – It is announced that the 2026 Eurovision Song Contest live tour, scheduled to begin in London on 15 June, had been postponed.
- 16 February – Organisers of the 2026 Meltdown Festival announce that the event would be headlined by Harry Styles.
- 17 February – The electronic music and YouTube content creator Look Mum No Computer is chosen to represent the United Kingdom at the 2026 Eurovision Song Contest.
- 20 February –
  - Sam Fender and Olivia Dean make UK chart history after their track "Rein Me In" reaches number one after 35 weeks on the chart.
  - The winners of the 2026 Radio 1 Dance Awards are announced.
- 25 February –
  - Phil Collins and Oasis are among artists to be nominated to the Rock and Roll Hall of Fame, they were announced as 2026 inductees two months later.
  - Cruz Beckham, the youngest son of David and Victoria, embarks on his first headline tour with his rock band, Cruz Beckham and the Breakers at a venue in Birmingham.
- 28 February – The 2026 Brit Awards are held at the Co-op Live arena in Manchester, the first time in the ceremony's history that it has been held outside London. The event includes Ozzy Osbourne being posthumously awarded the Lifetime Achievement Award, accepted by his widow Sharon and daughter Kelly.

=== March ===
- 3 March
  - The London Philharmonic Orchestra simultaneously announces the scheduled conclusion of the tenure of Edward Gardner as its principal conductor at the end of the 2027–2028 season, and the appointment of Paavo Järvi as its next chief conductor, effective with the 2028–2029 season.
  - Rapper Ghetts is sentenced to 12 years in prison for killing a student in a hit-and-run in north east London.
- 6 March – Launch of the first Official Christian & Gospel Singles Chart. Nottingham singer Jerub is the inaugural chart topper with a version of "Kumbaya".
- 8 March – The Monarchs Blues Band, a band with members from North Wales and Cheshire, are announced as the winners of One More Dream, a competition run by Boom Radio to give a band, group or artist another chance at being famous.
- 11 March – The UK government loses its appeal over a judgement of a terror charge against a member of the Irish language rap trio Kneecap.
- 12 March – The Royal Philharmonic Society announces the recipients of its 2026 RPS Awards:
  - Chamber-Scale Composition: Claudia Molitor – Fever
  - Conductor: John Wilson
  - Ensemble: Royal Scottish National Orchestra
  - Gamechanger: Jacob Collier
  - Impact: Orchestras for All
  - Inspiration: Kirkcaldy Orchestral Society
  - Instrumentalist: Peter Moore (trombone)
  - Large-Scale Composition: Mark-Anthony Turnage – Festen (libretto by Lee Hall)
  - Opera and Music Theatre: Uprising – Glyndebourne
  - Series and Events: "Multitudes" – Southbank Centre
  - Singer: Louise Alder (soprano)
  - Storytelling: "Everything We Do Is Music" – Elizabeth Alker
  - Young Artist: Matilda Lloyd (trumpet)
- 13 March
  - Opening of Sheffield's Electric Studio, which replaced the Leadmill, a music venue that closed in 2025.
  - Harry Styles' third album Kiss All the Time. Disco, Occasionally reaches the top of the UK Albums Chart following sales of 183,000 in its first week, making it the biggest selling physical album of the year.
- 13–15 March – The 2026 C2C: Country to Country festival are held at The O2 Arena in London, OVO Hydro in Glasgow, and SSE Arena in Belfast, headlined by Zach Top, Keith Urban, and Brooks & Dunn.
- 26 March – The 2026 MOBO Awards are held in Manchester.

=== April ===
- 5 April – Pepsi withdraws as the main sponsor of the Wireless Festival following the announcement of Kanye West as headliner for the three-day event.
- 6 April – The Armed Man: A Mass for Peace by Karl Jenkins is voted the most popular work in the Classic FM Hall of Fame 2026.
- 7 April – The 2026 Wireless Festival is cancelled after the UK government blocks Kanye West's entrance into the UK.
- 16 April –
  - The 2026 Jazz FM Awards are held at Koko in London.
  - Organisers of Paisley Alive, a one-day festival combining music with fitness sessions, scheduled for 4 July, cancels the event due to low ticket sales.
- 20 April – Launch of the Official Radio 1 Dance Chart, presented by Arielle Free on BBC Radio 1 Dance, and part of a rescheduling for the station.
- 21 April –
  - The schedule for the 2026 season of The Proms is announced, with concerts including one dedicated to James Bond music and Progressive rock.
  - Organisers of GlasGael, an Irish music festival planned for Glasgow Green on 2–3 May, postpone the event to 2027, citing rising costs triggered by world events that made it financially unviable.
- 25 April – BBC Radio 1Xtra hosts its first club night with the 1Xtra Takeover at EartH Hall in Hackney.
- 29 April – The BBC confirms that Radio 2 in the Park, scheduled to occur at City Park, Stirling from 7–9 August, would be rescheduled to September to avoid interfering with local events.

=== May ===
- 1 May – Zayn Malik cancels the US leg of his Konnakol Tour, and reduces his UK tour dates after being admitted to hospital.
- 5 May – British singer-songwriter M.I.A. is removed from American rapper Kid Cudi's "Rebel Rangers" tour due to offensive comments made during a concert.
- 12 May – The Royal Scottish National Orchestra announces simultaneously the scheduled conclusion of the tenure of Thomas Søndergård as its music director at the end of the 2025–2026 season, and the appointment of Giedrė Šlekytė as its next music director, the orchestra's first female conductor, effective with the 2027–2028 season.
- 22 May – UK chart history is made when rapper Drake debuts three albums, Iceman, Habibti and Maid of Honour, in the top ten.
- 22–24 May – BBC Radio 1's Big Weekend is held in Herrington Country Park, Sunderland. Performers include Fatboy Slim and Sonny Fodera (22 May), Zara Larsson, Louis Tomlinson and Lola Young (23 May), and Olivia Dean, Niall Horan and Kehlani (24 May).
- 29 May – Release of Paul McCartney's album The Boys of Dungeon Lane, his first release for six years, and inspired by his childhood in post-war Liverpool.

=== June ===
- 2 June – UK Culture Secretary Lisa Nandy announces the appointment of Dawn Airey as the new chair of Arts Council England, effective 1 August 2026, with an initial term of four years.
- 7 June – Mick Jagger makes a surprise appearance at a folk night in an Oxford pub and plays an impromptu gig with students.
- 12 June
  - The London Philharmonic Orchestra announces that David Burke would depart as its chief executive at the end of 2026.
  - Harry Styles plays the first of twelve dates at Wembley Stadium as part of his Together, Together tour, and sets a new record for the number of concerts played at the venue when he completed the Wembley leg of his tour on 4 July.
- 15 June – A spokesperson for Bonnie Tyler says that the singer had wakened from a coma she suffered the previous month, but remained "very unwell" in intensive care; she died three weeks later.
- 19 June – Richard Ashcroft headlines the opening night of the 2026 TRNSMT festival in Glasgow, with his set finishing early due to Scotland's 2026 FIFA World Cup match against Morocco at 11pm.
- 22 June – The throne used by Ozzy Osbourne for his final concert goes on display in Birmingham to mark the first anniversary of his death.
- 23 June – The BBC Scottish Symphony Orchestra simultaneously announces the scheduled conclusion of the tenure of Ryan Wigglesworth as its chief conductor at the end of the 2026–2027 season, and the appointment of Antony Hermus as its next chief conductor, effective in September 2027.
- 27 June–1 July – A new music festival, the Blenheim Palace Festival, is held in Oxfordshire.
- 29 June –
  - New Order announce that Stephen Morris and Gillian Gilbert would no longer be touring with the band due to "personal health reasons", although former member Peter Hook stated that he heard rumors that Morris and Gilbert were leaving the band.
  - Blur drummer Dave Rowntree loses his legal battle against PRS For Music over the distribution of "black box" royalties.

=== July ===
- 4 July – A walk of fame is launched in Harlesden, north west London, celebrating the area's reggae heritage.
- 5 July – Harry Styles is awarded a Guinness World Record for the longest run of concerts at Wembley Stadium after completing twelve shows at the venue.
- 11 July – Organisers of the Reading Festival have applied for a change to their licence that would allow performances on their main stage for a fourth day.
- 21 July – The BBC Introducing stage, which featured emerging talent such as Ed Sheeran and Florence and the Machine, is removed from the Reading Festival as part of an overhaul.
- 22 July – The Official Charts Company publishes a list of the UK's top selling albums of all time, with Queen's 1981 Greatest Hits album at number one.
- 23 July – Prime Minister Andy Burnham announces a 20% reduction in business rates for pubs, social clubs and live music venues from April 2027.
- 23–26 July – The WOMAD Festival returns after a year-long hiatus with the festival now based at Neston Park near Corsham, Wiltshire.
- 30 July – Paul McCartney is among the shortlist of nominees for the 2026 Mercury Prize for his album, The Boys of Dungeon Lane, the first time he had been nominated for the prize.
- 31 July – "Rein Me In", a duet by Sam Fender and Olivia Dean, breaks the record for spending the most number of weeks at the top of the UK singles chart after 19 non-consecutive weeks at number one.

=== August ===
- 1–8 August – The National Eisteddfod of Wales is held in Llantwd, Pembrokeshire.
- 10 August – Andrea Bocelli is announced to be performing at the Principality Stadium as part of the inaugural Land of Song Festival in May 2027.
- 12–16 August – The 2026 Boomtown Festival is held in Hampshire. Performers include Kneecap, Madness, Scissor Sisters, Faithless, Vengaboys and Groove Armada.
- 17 August –
  - Bonnie Tyler's memorial service is held in Swansea, and livestreamed worldwide via her website.
  - Organisers of the Green Man Festival announce that they would not burn a large wooden likeness of the Green Man as part of the closing ceremony because of the risk of wildfires.
- 28 August –
  - Paul Heaton's sixth solo album, Jenius, reaches number one in the UK Albums Chart, the first time one of his solo albums reached the top of the charts.
  - Six people are injured by a falling sign at the Big Church Festival in West Sussex.
- 30 August – Lola Young plays a surprise set at the 2026 Reading Festival.

=== September ===
- 1 September – "Do You Mind" (2009) by Kyla is named as TikTok's song of the summer in the UK after the song experienced a resurgence on the app.
- 4 September –
  - A 30ft mural of Freddie Mercury is unveiled at Wembley Park for what would have been his 80th birthday.
  - English-Spanish girlgroup MISSU release their debut single, 'OUTTASIGHT'.
- 8 September – Organisers of the Glastonbury Festival announce that tickets for the 2027 festival would go on sale in October.
- 11–13 September – Radio 2 in the Park is held at City Park, Stirling, having been rescheduled from August.
- 24 September – Sugababes release "Ghost" alongside the announcement of their self-titled ninth studio album, due for release in February 2027.
- 29 September – Organisers of the Terminal V festival confirm it will take place in Glasgow from 4–6 June 2027.
- 30 September –
  - A set of unheard Oasis recordings valued at between £1.2m and £1.6m are withdrawn from an auction following an injunction filed by lawyers representing the band.
  - The first batch of tickets for Glastonbury 2027 go on sale, and sell out within 30 minutes.

=== October ===
- 3 October – A guitar belonging to Noel Gallagher sells for £12,000 at auction.
- 4 October –
  - BBC Radio 6 Music airs a newly revised version of the Pet Shop Boys' A Man from the Future, a work concerning Alan Turing, as part of Stuart Maconie's Freak Zone.
  - A second batch of Glastonbury 2027 tickets sells out within 42 minutes.
- 22 October – Raye wins the 2026 Mercury Prize for her album This Music May Contain Hope.

=== November ===
- 9 November – DJ and producer Hannah Laing announces the cancellation of her Doof in the Park festival for 2027 after "behind the scenes issues" were not resolved.
- 11 November – It is announced that Dua Lipa will become the first British female artist to headline the Coachella Festival in April 2027.
- 12 November – Duran Duran drummer Roger Taylor announces he is leaving the band because of his worsening tinnitus.
- 18 November – It is announced that Harry Styles, Billie Eilish, Sam Fender and Cher will be headline acts at Glastonbury 2027.

== Bands reformed ==
- Hear'Say
- Lighthouse Family
- Mis-Teeq

== Bands disbanded ==
- The Hollies

== Charts and sales ==
=== Number-one singles ===
The singles chart includes a proportion for streaming.

| Chart date (week ending) | Song | Artist(s) | Chart sales | References |
|---|---|---|---|---|
| 1 January | "Last Christmas" | Wham! | 92,580 | |
| 8 January | "Where Is My Husband!" | Raye | 43,910 | |
| 15 January | "End of Beginning" | Djo | 47,898 | |
| 22 January | "End of Beginning" | Djo | 53,743 | |
| 29 January | "Raindance" | Dave and Tems | 50,474 | |
| 5 February | "Aperture" | Harry Styles | 70,498 | |
| 12 February | "Raindance" | Dave and Tems | 43,829 | |
| 19 February | "Opalite" | Taylor Swift | 47,509 | |
| 26 February | "Rein Me In" | Sam Fender and Olivia Dean | 43,425 | |
| 5 March | "Rein Me In" | Sam Fender and Olivia Dean | 46,272 | |
| 12 March | "Rein Me In" | Sam Fender and Olivia Dean | 62,104 | |
| 19 March | "American Girls" | Harry Styles | 64,056 | |
| 26 March | "Rein Me In" | Sam Fender and Olivia Dean | 61,422 | |
| 2 April | "Rein Me In" | Sam Fender and Olivia Dean | 62,384 | |
| 9 April | "Rein Me In" | Sam Fender and Olivia Dean | 60,713 | |
| 16 April | "Rein Me In" | Sam Fender and Olivia Dean | 60,510 | |
| 23 April | "Rein Me In" | Sam Fender and Olivia Dean | 55,822 | |
| 30 April | "Drop Dead" | Olivia Rodrigo | 65,435 | |
| 7 May | "Rein Me In" | Sam Fender and Olivia Dean | 58,189 | |
| 14 May | "Rein Me In" | Sam Fender and Olivia Dean | 56,538 | |
| 21 May | "Rein Me In" | Sam Fender and Olivia Dean | 50,182 | |
| 28 May | "Rein Me In" | Sam Fender and Olivia Dean | 47,622 | |
| 4 June | "Rein Me In" | Sam Fender and Olivia Dean | 56,132 | |
| 11 June | "Hate That I Made You Love Me" | Ariana Grande | 50,048 | |
| 18 June | "I Knew It, I Knew You" | Taylor Swift | 52,434 | |
| 25 June | "I Knew It, I Knew You" | Taylor Swift | 71,404 | |
| 2 July | "Rein Me In" | Sam Fender and Olivia Dean | 43,461 | |
| 9 July | "Rein Me In" | Sam Fender and Olivia Dean | 41,708 | |
| 16 July | "Rein Me In" | Sam Fender and Olivia Dean | 41,014 | |
| 23 July | "Rein Me In" | Sam Fender and Olivia Dean | 48,901 | |
| 30 July | "Rein Me In" | Sam Fender and Olivia Dean | 43,450 | |
| 6 August | "Rein Me In" | Sam Fender and Olivia Dean | 44,474 | |
| 13 August | "Rein Me In" | Sam Fender and Olivia Dean | 46,486 | |
| 20 August | "Rein Me In" | Sam Fender and Olivia Dean | 43,509 | |
| 27 August | "Rein Me In" | Sam Fender and Olivia Dean | 41,475 | |
| 3 September | "Rein Me In" | Sam Fender and Olivia Dean | 40,241 | |
| 10 September | "Choosin' Texas" | Ella Langley | 26,909 | |
| 17 September | "Great Expectation" | Sienna Spiro | 28,147 | |
| 24 September | "Great Expectation" | Sienna Spiro | 27,216 | |
| 1 October | "Great Expectation" | Sienna Spiro | 26,900 | |
| 8 October | "Patient Zero" | Taylor Swift | 46,993 | |
| 15 October | "Patient Zero" | Taylor Swift | 38,455 | |
| 22 October | "Patient Zero" | Taylor Swift | 55,413 | |
| 29 October | "Babydoll" | Jamie Miller | 47,548 | |
| 5 November | "Babydoll" | Jamie Miller | 69,840 | |
| 12 November | "Babydoll" | Jamie Miller | 68,794 | |
| 19 November | "Babydoll" | Jamie Miller | 66,487 | |
| 26 November | "Babydoll" | Jamie Miller | 64,036 | |

=== Number-one albums ===
The albums chart includes a proportion for streaming.

| Chart date (week ending) | Album | Artist(s) | Chart sales | References |
|---|---|---|---|---|
| 1 January | Christmas | Michael Bublé | 20,818 | |
| 8 January | The Art of Loving | Olivia Dean | 16,903 | |
| 15 January | The Art of Loving | Olivia Dean | 17,141 | |
| 22 January | The Art of Loving | Olivia Dean | 16,836 | |
| 29 January | Britpop | Robbie Williams | 34,157 | |
| 5 February | How Did I Get Here? | Louis Tomlinson | 28,416 | |
| 12 February | The Art of Loving | Olivia Dean | 18,557 | |
| 19 February | The Art of Loving | Olivia Dean | 18,490 | |
| 26 February | Wuthering Heights | Charli XCX | 21,071 | |
| 5 March | Prizefighter | Mumford & Sons | 35,505 | |
| 12 March | The Mountain | Gorillaz | 29,982 | |
| 19 March | Kiss All the Time. Disco, Occasionally | Harry Styles | 183,045 | |
| 26 March | Kiss All the Time. Disco, Occasionally | Harry Styles | 26,524 | |
| 2 April | Arirang | BTS | 41,551 | |
| 9 April | This Music May Contain Hope | Raye | 46,976 | |
| 16 April | The Weight of the Woods | Dermot Kennedy | 22,155 | |
| 23 April | The Art of Loving | Olivia Dean | 12,585 | |
| 30 April | You Got This | Skindred | 20,414 | |
| 7 May | The Great Divide | Noah Kahan | 55,826 | |
| 14 May | The Essential Michael Jackson | Michael Jackson | 29,453 | |
| 21 May | The Essential Michael Jackson | Michael Jackson | 31,628 | |
| 28 May | Iceman | Drake | 44,129 | |
| 4 June | Florescence | Maisie Peters | 29,826 | |
| 11 June | The Boys of Dungeon Lane | Paul McCartney | 33,642 | |
| 18 June | Dinner Party | Niall Horan | 28,121 | |
| 25 June | You Seem Pretty Sad for a Girl So in Love | Olivia Rodrigo | 102,814 | |
| 2 July | You Seem Pretty Sad for a Girl So in Love | Olivia Rodrigo | 28,002 | |
| 9 July | The Wow! Signal | Muse | 34,933 | |
| 16 July | Confessions II | Madonna | 48,502 | |
| 23 July | Foreign Tongues | The Rolling Stones | 38,016 | |
| 30 July | Daughter from Hell | Gracie Abrams | 30,897 | |
| 6 August | Music, Fashion, Film | Charli XCX | 22,322 | |
| 13 August | Petal | Ariana Grande | 47,889 | |
| 20 August | A Love Letter to a Broken Town | The Reytons | 15,031 | |
| 27 August | Lost Weekend | Phoebe Bridgers | 34,239 | |
| 3 September | Jenius | Paul Heaton | 23,654 | |
| 10 September | Wildchild | Alex Warren | 24,309 | |
| 17 September | Act III | Kasabian | 14,373 | |
| 24 September | Here Because of Hope | Ezra Collective | 13,181 | |
| 1 October | Pylon | Beabadoobee | 21,065 | |
| 8 October | The Life of a Showgirl | Taylor Swift | 29,591 | |
| 15 October | Songs from the Wedding Cake | Blossoms | 26,713 | |
| 22 October | Ghosts (100 Days of Morning) | Jamie T | 18,494 | |
| 29 October | Dopamine Chamber | Fontaines D.C. | 70,105 | |
| 5 November | The Black Parade | My Chemical Romance | 20,172 | |
| 12 November | Perfecth | Queens of the Stone Age | 13,851 | |
| 19 November | Airplane Mode | James Blunt | 26,318 | |
| 26 November | Carnaval de Luz | U2 | 42,512 | |

=== Number-one compilation albums ===
The compilation albums chart includes a proportion for streaming.

| Chart date (week ending) | Album | Chart sales | References |
|---|---|---|---|
| 1 January | KPop Demon Hunters | 10,673 | |
| 8 January | KPop Demon Hunters | 11,111 | |
| 15 January | KPop Demon Hunters | 9,229 | |
| 22 January | KPop Demon Hunters | 8,993 | |
| 29 January | KPop Demon Hunters | 8,620 | |
| 5 February | KPop Demon Hunters | 8,224 | |
| 12 February | KPop Demon Hunters | 7,966 | |
| 19 February | KPop Demon Hunters | 7,608 | |
| 26 February | KPop Demon Hunters | 7,926 | |
| 5 March | KPop Demon Hunters | 7,007 | |
| 12 March | KPop Demon Hunters | 6,932 | |
| 19 March | Help(2) | 18,491 | |
| 26 March | KPop Demon Hunters | 6,385 | |
| 2 April | KPop Demon Hunters | 6,184 | |
| 9 April | KPop Demon Hunters | 6,421 | |
| 16 April | KPop Demon Hunters | 6,338 | |
| 23 April | KPop Demon Hunters | 5,629 | |
| 30 April | Now 123 | 6,088 | |
| 7 May | KPop Demon Hunters | 5,023 | |
| 14 May | KPop Demon Hunters | 4,657 | |
| 21 May | Now Yearbook 1972 | 4,923 | |
| 28 May | Eurovision Song Contest: Vienna 2026 | 6,672 | |
| 4 June | Paddington: The Musical | 6,634 | |
| 11 June | KPop Demon Hunters | 4,011 | |
| 18 June | KPop Demon Hunters | 3,868 | |
| 25 June | KPop Demon Hunters | 3,785 | |
| 2 July | KPop Demon Hunters | 3,780 | |
| 9 July | KPop Demon Hunters | 3,720 | |
| 16 July | KPop Demon Hunters | 3,640 | |
| 23 July | KPop Demon Hunters | 3,583 | |
| 30 July | KPop Demon Hunters | 3,793 | |
| 6 August | KPop Demon Hunters | 3,788 | |
| 13 August | Now 124 | 5,954 | |
| 20 August | KPop Demon Hunters | 3,559 | |
| 27 August | KPop Demon Hunters | 3,530 | |
| 3 September | KPop Demon Hunters | 3,401 | |
| 10 September | Now Yearbook 1971 | 4,322 | |
| 17 September | KPop Demon Hunters | 3,074 | |
| 24 September | KPop Demon Hunters | 2,931 | |
| 1 October | KPop Demon Hunters | 2,895 | |
| 8 October | Northern Exposure Redux | 3,306 | |
| 15 October | KPop Demon Hunters | 2,805 | |
| 22 October | KPop Demon Hunters | 2,832 | |
| 29 October | KPop Demon Hunters | 2,764 | |
| 5 November | KPop Demon Hunters | 3,147 | |
| 12 November | Now Yearbook 1994 | 3,398 | |
| 19 November | The Phantom of the Opera (2026 mix) | 5,004 | |
| 26 November | Now 125 | 5,767 | |

== Deaths ==
- 2 January – Tony Carr, 98, Maltese session drummer and percussionist (CCS, Hot Chocolate).
- 5 January
  - Andrew Bodnar, 71, English bass guitarist (The Rumour) and songwriter ("I Love the Sound of Breaking Glass"). (death announced on this date)
  - Andrew Carter, 86, classical choral composer and pedagogue
- 11 January
  - Sheila Bernette, 94, English singer (The Good Old Days, The Black and White Minstrel Show) and actress (The Magnificent Seven Deadly Sins).
  - Andrew Clements, 75, classical music critic
  - Matt Kwasniewski-Kelvin, 26, British guitarist (Black Midi). (death announced on this date)
  - John Wallace, 76, Scottish trumpeter, composer and arts educator.
- 15 January – Kenny Morris, 68, English drummer (Siouxsie and the Banshees). (death announced on this date)
- 26 January – Danny Coughlan, British singer and guitarist.
- 10 February –
  - Des de Moor, 64, English writer and musician. (death announced on this date)
  - Andrew Ranken, 72, English drummer (The Pogues).
- 21 February – John Bertalot, 94, English organist.
- 2 March –
  - Len Garry, 84, English musician (The Quarrymen), pneumonia.
  - Mike Vernon, 81, English record producer ("Albatross", "Hocus Pocus"), music executive and recording studio owner (Chipping Norton Recording Studios).
- 9 March – Zeph Ellis, 37, British rapper. (death announced on this date)
- 13 March – Phil Campbell, 64, Welsh guitarist (Motörhead, Persian Risk, Phil Campbell and the Bastard Sons).
- 20 March – Richard Phillips, 85, British music promoter. (death announced on this date)
- 25 March – Mick Roberts, 57, English singer (The Bridewell Taxis).
- 31 March – Tony Rivers, 85, English singer (Harmony Grass).
- 5 April – David Wiffen, 84, English–Canadian folk singer-songwriter (Driving Wheel).
- 11 April – Mike Westbrook, 90, English jazz pianist and composer.
- 16 April – Andy Kershaw, 66, English broadcaster and radio DJ (BBC Radio 1), cancer.
- 19 April –
  - Ben Bartlett, 61, British composer, lung cancer.
  - Dave Mason, 79, English Hall of Fame musician (Traffic) and songwriter ("Hole in My Shoe", "Feelin' Alright?").
- 22 April – Kathy Dooley, 70, British singer (The Dooleys), dementia.
- 27 April – Beverley Martyn, 79, British singer-songwriter.
- 29 April – Donald MacRae, 84, Scottish folk singer.
- 30 April – Alex Ligertwood, 79, Scottish musician and singer (Santana).
- 6 May – Jesse Hector, 78, English musician (The Gorillas).
- 15 May – Felicity Lott, 79, English soprano, cancer.
- 22 May – Dick Parry, 83, English saxophonist (Pink Floyd).
- 23 May – Brian Large, 87, English opera director.
- 24 May – Betty Roe, 95, English composer, singer and vocal coach. (death announced on this date)
- 26 May – Arnold Whittall, 90, English classical musicologist.
- 29 May –
  - Lauren Bennett, 36, English singer (G.R.L., "Party Rock Anthem").
  - Geoff Keating, 88, British musician (The Master Singers). (death announced on this date)
  - Doug Shaw, 42, British musician (Gang Gang Dance, White Magic). (death announced on this date)
- 3 June – Kanya King, 57, British businesswoman, founder of the MOBO Awards, colon cancer.
- 4 June – Ian Hampton, 79, Scottish bassist (Sparks).
- 5 June – Talay Riley, 35, British singer ("Make You Mine") and songwriter ("Young Dumb & Broke", "Bounce"), stabbed.
- 6 June – Harrison Cole, 25, classical organist.
- 9 June – Bruno Turner, 95, British musicologist.
- 11 June – Philip Booth, 66, British-Canadian guitarist and keyboardist ("Ulterior Motives"). (death announced on this date)
- 13 June – Dee Palmer, 88, English musician (Jethro Tull), arranger, and composer.
- 14 June – Dave Greenslade, 83, English composer and keyboardist (Colosseum, Greenslade, If). (death announced on this date)
- 24 June – David Clayton-Thomas, 84, British-Canadian singer (Blood, Sweat & Tears) and songwriter ("Spinning Wheel").
- 30 June – Brian Potter, 86–87, British-born American songwriter and record producer.
- 5 July –
  - Beaky, 81, English musician (Dave Dee, Dozy, Beaky, Mick & Tich). (death announced on this date)
  - Christian Moran, 42, English-Korean drummer.
- 8 July – Bonnie Tyler, 75, Welsh singer ("Total Eclipse of the Heart", "Holding Out for a Hero", "It's a Heartache"), complications from intestinal surgery.
- 9 July – Calvin Hayes, 63, British musician (Johnny Hates Jazz).
- 18 July – Tony Thorpe, 80, English guitarist and singer (The Rubettes). (death announced on this date)
- 23 July –
  - Asteryth Sloane, 26, British composer and poet. (death announced on this date)
  - William Orbit, 69, British musician, producer (Barber's Adagio For Strings, Feel Good Time)
- 3 August – John Douglas, 63, Scottish musician (Trashcan Sinatras) and songwriter ("Obscurity Knocks", "Only Tongue Can Tell").
- 9 August – Gary Dwyer, British drummer (The Teardrop Explodes, The Colourfield), leukaemia.
- 11 August
  - Jill Gomez (Jill Carnegy, Countess of Northesk), 83, Trinidadian-British soprano.
  - Sheila Mathews, 99, English actress, singer and dancer.
- 13 August – Derry Brownson, 55, English musician (EMF), brain tumour.
- 23 August – Harry Bramma, 89, British organist and composer.
- 25 August – Tim Curry, 80, English actor and singer.
- 4 September – Craig Douglas, 85, English singer.
- 15 September – Ben Saunders, 43, English-born Dutch singer (Follow That Dream).
- 17 September – Sway, 44, British rapper. (death announced on this date)
- 27 September – Ronnie Golden, British singer (The Fabulous Poodles) and comedian, heart attack. (death announced on this date)
- 28 September – Bob Davenport, 94, English traditional folk singer. (death announced on this date)
- 29 September – Conrad "Cronos" Lant, 63, English singer and bassist (Venom).
- 5 October –
  - George Fenton, 76, English film and television composer (Gandhi, The Fisher King, Planet Earth).
  - Lena Martell, 86, Scottish singer ("One Day at a Time"). (death announced on this date)
- 12 October – Brian Jones, 85, English saxophonist (The Undertakers).
- 24 October – Nigel Durham, 61, British drummer (Saxon). (death announced on this date)

== See also ==
- 2026 in British radio
- 2026 in British television
- 2026 in the United Kingdom
- List of British films of 2026
