= Peter Waring =

English comedian, illusionist and fraudster (1916–1949)

- Born: John Roderick Rodriguez; 25 December 1916; Lewisham, London, England
- Died: 9 July 1949 (aged 32); HMP Pentonville, London, England
- Other name: John Peter Roderick Mainwaring
- Occupations: Comedian, illusionist
- Years active: 1943–1949

Peter Waring (born John Roderick Rodriguez, later known as John Peter Roderick Mainwaring; 25 December 1916 – 9 July 1949) was an English stage and radio comedian, illusionist and fraudster.

== Biography ==
Waring was born John Roderick Rodriguez in Lewisham, London, into a respectable family of Portuguese ancestry, and attended a Catholic school in Southwark. As a youth, he was apprehended by the authorities on several occasions, including for embezzlement and vagrancy when he was 13. After absconding from borstal he spent some months in the Army in 1932, before it was found that he was under age. He was then arrested for stowing away on the Empress of Britain, when he received a serious injury to his arm from scalding, and made further attempts to stow away on ships to the United States. In 1935, under the false name "Malcolm Desmond Travers", he found work as a footman to Lord Sysonby, but was dismissed and subsequently arrested for theft of valuables from St James's Palace; he was convicted and spent more time in borstal. In 1938, described as a fruiterer's assistant, he married Leita Smith. They had two children, but later separated and divorced.

He had further convictions for fraud, obtaining money by false pretences, and minor theft, and in 1941 was also convicted of falsely representing himself as a naval intelligence officer, resulting in him spending some time in prison. After his release, he travelled to Blackpool and, after again presenting himself as a wounded former naval officer, attempted to find work as a stage magician. This was successful, and in 1943, concealing his past, he appeared in theatres in the north of England and London, billed as Peter Waring, "Just Tricks... and Things". He toured with comedian and musician Vic Oliver, and formally applied to change his name to John Peter Roderick Mainwaring. He became successful, interspersing his magic tricks – possibly learned when in prison – with comic patter. He was regarded as "one of the new generation of British magicians.. [who] performed standard tricks in an entertaining manner....". He appeared in variety shows around the country, and in 1945 was described in one review as "a smiling, debonair, young comedian who has enjoyed a meteoric rise in fame.. with his sophisticated style and polished manner of subtle humour."

Around this time, he was seen by the young Benny Hill, who later said:

Waring was the biggest influence on my life. He was delicate, highly strung and sensitive…when I saw him I thought, 'My God, it’s so easy. You don’t have to come on shouting, "Ere, ‘ere, missus! Got the music 'Arry? Now missus, don’t get your knickers in a twist!" You can come on like Waring and say, "Not many in tonight. There’s enough room at the back to play rugby. My God, they are playing rugby..."

In 1946, Waring made his first appearance in a BBC radio broadcast, live from the Windmill Theatre, and took part in Stars in Battledress concerts. Later that year, he starred in the BBC radio comedy series Heigh Ho, playing the part of a former naval officer who was seeking new employment. The show was scripted by Frank Muir, his first major comedy commission, and was well received. The BBC's publicity claimed that Waring was, in fact, a decorated former Navy Lieutenant Commander Peter Roderick-Mainwaring, DSO, but after the BBC became aware of his true background and convictions, rehearsals for a second series were stopped. He continued to perform in theatres, but with less success than previously, and also made occasional radio appearances. He became engaged to actress Sheila Mathews, whose father investigated Waring's background. As a result, in 1948 Waring was declared bankrupt.

In 1949, Waring took legal action against the Daily Mail for libel, but shortly afterwards was arrested for the non-payment of maintenance to his former wife, for obtaining credit when bankrupt, and for obtaining money by false pretences from a Harley Street doctor. The proceedings of his trial were widely publicised in the media. Waring was found guilty on all charges, and on 8 July 1949 was sentenced to a total of nine months imprisonment. The next day, he was found dead in his cell at HMP Pentonville, after hanging himself with a rope used for making mailbags.

A drama, Mr Waring of the BBC, a "curated drama of archive documents and memoirs" by Freddie Phillips, with Freddie Fox as Waring, was broadcast by BBC Radio 4 in June 2021.
