= Henry William Rice =

British Royal Navy signalman and D-Day veteran (1920s–2026)

Henry Rice
- Born: Henry William Rice; Not recognized as a date. Years must have 4 digits (use leading zeros for years < 1000). Clapham, London, England
- Died: October 2026 (aged 100)
- Military career
- Allegiance: United Kingdom
- Branch: Royal Navy
- Service years: 1943–
- Rank: Signalman
- Unit: HMS Eastway
- Conflicts: Second World War; Normandy landings
- Awards: Legion of Honour

Henry William Rice (1925 or 1926 – October 2026) was a British Royal Navy signalman who served on the dock landing ship HMS Eastway during the Normandy landings of the Second World War. In later life he became a prominent figure in remembrance activities to schoolchildren in Britain and France and returning regularly to Normandy for commemorations. He was to the French Legion of Honour and was president of the Cranleigh and District branch of the Royal British Legion. At the time of his death he was described in the press as one of the last surviving British D-Day veterans.

== Early life ==
Rice was born in Clapham, London. He joined the Royal Navy in 1943, aged 17, and was serving at HMS Collingwood in Fareham before being sent to France.

== Military service ==
Rice served as signalman, responsible for communicating with the crew and with other vessels by flag and light. He was posted to ''Eastway'', a ''Casa Grande'', class dock landing ship, which carried troops and equipment to the Normandy beaches. Eastway arrived off Juno Beach on 11 June 1944 five days after D-Day, carrying Canadian personal and equipment. Rice later recalled that, about two weeks before Germany's surrender in 1945 he was on lookout duty aboard the Eastway in the Bristol Channel when he saw the wake of a torpedo heading to the ship. The vessel's flat bottom meant the torpedo passed under it without causing damage. After Normandy he served in the Mediterranean and in 1945 he was sent to the Far East.

== Remembrance work ==
In later life Rice dedicated much of his time to remembrance. He spoke about the war to schoolchildren in Britain and France, and in 2024 told the Press Association and BBC Surry that it was important to teach young people about the war. Ahead of the 80th anniversary of D-Day in 2024 he took part in an event in London launching the commemorations. He travelled to Normandy with veterans supported by the Spirit of Normandy Trust, including in June 2026 for the 82nd anniversary, when he appeared at Sword Beach with fellow veteran Ken Hay. He also attended the reception or Second World War Pacific veterans at Windsor Castle marking the 80th anniversary of VJ Day where he met William, Prince of Wales. In July 2026 he was among veterans honoured at a birthday lunch at HMS Excellent, Portsmouth. He was president of the Cranleigh and District branch or the Royal British Legion.

== Honours ==
France appointed Rice to the Legion of Honour for his wartime service.

== Personal life and death ==
Rice lived in Cranleigh, Surrey, and had five grandchildren. His death aged 100, was announced on 12 October 2026, by the Spirit of Normandy Trust, which described him as "great character with a cheeky smile". Ken Hey, another another Normandy veteran with whom he had returned to France, died a month earlier aged 101.
