= Theo Burrell =

British antiques specialist, auctioneer and television expert (1986–2026)

- Born: Theodora Helen Burrell; 1 September 1986; Edinburgh, Scotland
- Died: 8 July 2026 (aged 39)
- Education: University of Glasgow
- Occupations: Antiques specialist; auctioneer; television expert
- Employer(s): Lyon & Turnbull
- Known for: Antiques Roadshow

Theodora Helen Burrell (1 September 1986 – 8 July 2026) was a British antiques specialist, auctioneer and television expert, known for her appearances as a ceramics and decorative arts specialist on the BBC reality show television programme Antiques Roadshow. She worked as a specialist and auctioneer at the auction house Lyon & Turnbull. From 2023 she was a patron of the charity Brain Tumour Research, following her diagnosis with glioblastoma in 2022.

== Early life and education ==
Theodora Helen Burrell was born in Edinburgh, Scotland, on 1 September 1986. She studied at the University of Glasgow, where she completed a Master of Arts degree in History followed by a Master of Letters (MLitt) in Decorative Arts.

She developed an interest in antiques at a young age, working as viewing staff at Lyon & Turnbull during her teenage years and later returning to the firm as an intern while completing her postgraduate studies.

== Career ==
Burrell joined Lyon & Turnbull in July 2011 as a specialist in antiques and decorative arts. Early in her career she ran seasonal antiques auctions and contributed to the development of the company's "Interiors" sale format. In 2012 she qualified as an auctioneer and began conducting sales across a range of categories. Her areas of expertise include European ceramics, glass, and decorative arts, with a particular focus on objects from the late nineteenth and twentieth centuries.

She joined the team of experts on the BBC programme Antiques Roadshow in 2018, in which specialists examine and appraise objects brought in by members of the public at filming events across the United Kingdom.

== Personal life ==
Burrell lived in East Lothian, Scotland, with her partner, Alex, and their son.

=== Health and death ===
In June 2022, at the age of 35, Burrell was diagnosed with glioblastoma, an aggressive form of brain tumour, after experiencing several months of severe migraines and neurological symptoms. She subsequently underwent brain surgery, radiotherapy, and chemotherapy.

Burrell died from the illness on 8 July 2026, at the age of 39.

== Advocacy ==
Burrell publicly documented her experience of living with a terminal diagnosis, speaking openly about its emotional and physical impact.

In November 2023, she became a patron of Brain Tumour Research participated in campaigns calling for increased funding for brain tumour research.
