= John Walker (cinematographer) =

British cinematographer (1943–2026)

- Born: John Henry Walker; 1943
- Died: 18 August 2026 (aged 83); Taunton, Somerset, England
- Occupation: Cinematographer
- Spouse: Mavis Rose
- Children: 2

John Henry Walker (1943 – 18 August 2026) was a British cinematographer. He was best known for his cinematography work in the television programs Doctor Who, Only Fools and Horses, Miss Marple, The Onedin Line, Juliet Bravo, Wycliffe and Hamish Macbeth.

Walker died on 18 August 2026, aged 83. He was cremated on 7 September in Taunton, Somerset.
