= Kenneth Hay (veteran) =

British D-Day veteran (1925–2026)

Kenneth Hay MBE
- Born: 3 August 1925
- Died: September 2026 (aged 101)
- Military career
- Allegiance: United Kingdom
- Branch: British Army
- Unit: 4th Dorset Regiment
- Known for: D-Day veteran and prisoner of war
- Conflicts: Normandy landings
- Awards: MBE; Légion d'honneur

Kenneth Hay MBE (3 August 1925 – September 2026) was a British Army soldier and veteran of WWII. He served with the 4th Battalion, Dorsetshire Regiment, in the Battle of Normandy, was captured in July 1944 and worked as a prisoner of war in a coal mine in Poland, before surviving a forced march of about 1,000 miles westwards in the winter of 1945. In later life he visited schools speaking about his wartime experience and served as a British ambassador for the British Normandy Memorial. He was appointed an MBE for services to the community and was made a member of the French Legion of Honour.

== Early life ==
Hay was born in Barking, east London, on 3 August 1925. During the Second World War he served in the Home Guard, where he met his future wife, Doris. In 1943 he volunteered for the Essex Regiment at Warley.

== Military service ==
Hay served with the 4th Battalion of the Dorsetshire Regiment. His battalion landed at Courseulles-sur-Mer, on Juno Beach, in the weeks following the Normandy landings. On the night of 7-8 July 1944 Hay was taken prisoner while on a night patrol. He later said the patrol had been intended to destroy a self-propelled gun in no man's land, but had in fact moved behind German lines.

== Later life ==
Hay was demobilised in 1947 and returned to his pre-war post as a junior clerk in the borough architect's department at Barking Town Hall. He later worked for the London, Midland and Scottish Railway and became partnership secretary at an architects' practice. He married Doris in 1947 and the couple settled in Upminster in the London Borough of Havering, later having two children. He made regular visits to schools telling his wartimes stories to students and according to The British Normandy Memorial ha was nicknamed "Grandad Ken" by the children he met. He was an ambassador for the British Normandy Memorial, which commemorates the 22,442 British service personnel who died under British command during the Battle of Normandy. In June 2026 he attended a remembrance service at the General Montgomery monument at Colleville-Montgomery with fellow veteran Henry Rice, as part of commemorations of the 82nd anniversary of D-Day.

== Honours ==
Hay was appointed Member of the Order of the British Empire (MBE) for services to the community and was awarded the French Legion of Honour.

== Death ==
The British Normandy Memorial announced Hay's death on 20 September 2026. He was 101.
