= Jake Hall (TV personality) =

English television personality and businessman (1990–2026)

- Born: Jake James George Hall; 20 August 1990; Tower Hamlets, London, England
- Died: 6 May 2026 (aged 35); Santa Margalida, Mallorca, Spain
- Occupations: Television personality; model; entrepreneur
- Television: The Only Way Is Essex
- Children: 1

Jake James George Hall (20 August 1990 – 6 May 2026) was an English television personality, model and businessman, known for appearing as a cast member on the ITV reality series The Only Way Is Essex between 2015 and 2016. He also created and owned the menswear fashion brands Prévu Studio and By Jake Hall, as well as being a member of a band named Yours.

== Life and career ==
Jake James George Hall was born on 20 August 1990 in the London Borough of Tower Hamlets, England. He had previously worked as a model. In 2015, Hall joined the cast of the ITV reality series The Only Way Is Essex. He made his first appearance during the show's fourteenth series. In May 2016, Hall was stabbed whilst in a nightclub in Marbella. He departed the series following the seventeenth series in 2016. Following his departure from the show, he created his own menswear fashion label Prévu Studio and appeared in a behind the scenes series of the brand. He created a further brand By Jake Hall. In 2023, he became a member of the band Yours and they released a single, "What's Mine is Yours", the following year. Hall had a daughter, born in 2017, from a previous relationship with Misse Beqiri, who appeared on the ITV reality series The Real Housewives of Cheshire.

Hall died on 6 May 2026, at the age of 35, after sustaining fatal injuries from smashing his head through a glass door at a villa in Santa Margalida, Mallorca, Spain. He was 35. Several tributes were paid to him including from The Only Way Is Essex who said "[Hall] was a part of the TOWIE family for a number of years and we send our very deepest sympathies to his family and friends following today's very sad news."

== Filmography ==
As himself
Year	Title	Notes	Ref.
2015–2016	The Only Way Is Essex	Series regular	
2017	Prévu	Main role	
