= Michael Aspinall =

British opera singer and musicologist (1939–2026)

- Born: George Michael Aspinall; 31 October 1939; Stockport, Cheshire, England
- Died: 10 July 2026 (aged 86) Naples, Italy
- Occupations: Singer; musicologist
- Instrument: Vocals

George Michael Aspinall (31 October 1939 – 10 July 2026) was a British singer, performer of opera parodies and musicologist.

== Life and career ==
George Michael Aspinall was born in Stockport, Cheshire, England on 31 October 1939. He was educated at Manchester Grammar School and Manchester University, then went to London to study singing with Anthony Benskin. In 1966 he took further lessons in Rome from Vincenzo D'Alessandro and Adolfo Baruti, settling in Rome and later in Naples for the rest of his life. Aspinall taught singing in Rome, Milan, Naples and Sicily. He composed opera cadenzas for Montserrat Caballé.

In the 1970s and 1980s Aspinall became well known for the opera parodies he composed, performed and toured extensively (for example, La traviata, Tosca and La Gioconda), as well as parodies of Schubert songs. In his concerts he would dress up as an archetypal opera diva, singing in falsetto. His LP of these performances,The Surprising Soprano, was first issued by Decca in 1976. In 1972 he sang the comic drag role of Mamma Agata (baritone) in Donizetti's opera buffa Le convenienze ed inconvenienze teatrali. In 1982 he appeared at the Maggio Musicale Fiorentino as Mother Goose (contralto) in Stravinsky's The Rake's Progress.

As a musicologist, his particular expertise was the history of vocal art, especially bel canto. He lectured and wrote (mostly in German) on singers and singing, contributed to collections of essays, and provided commentaries for liner notes of historical recordings.

Aspinall died in Naples, Italy on 10 July 2026, aged 86.
