= Max Wideman =

British civil engineer (1927–2026)

Robert Max Wideman
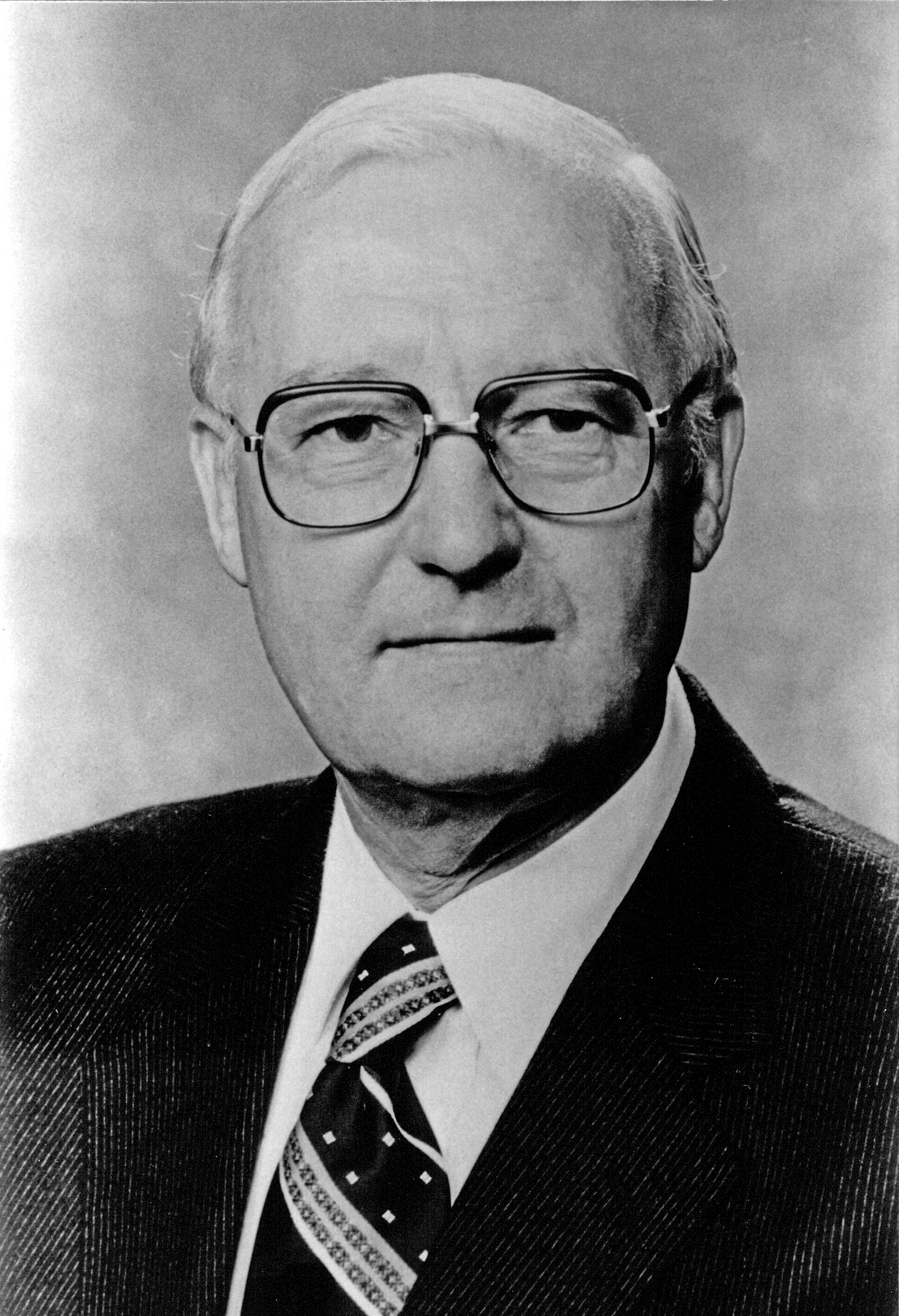
- Born: 19 January 1927; Penarth, Wales
- Died: 14 June 2026 (aged 99); Victoria, British Columbia, Canada
- Education: BSc Honours Civil Engineering, 1947, City & Guilds College, London University, England
- Occupations: Civil engineer, project management consultant, author, professional speaker
- Known for: Development of the Project Management Body of Knowledge (PMBoK)
- Spouse: Audrey Eva Wideman
- Website: link

Robert Max Wideman (19 January 1927 – 14 June 2026) was a British-Canadian project management consultant. He is the creator of the first edition of A Guide to the Project Management Body of Knowledge, the Project Management Institute's foundational book on the process of project management. Wideman is also well known for his free comprehensive project management knowledge web site that contains over 12,500 pages, 550 Issacons (issues and considerations), and 280,000 links (as of September 2010).

== Early life, education, and career ==
Wideman was born at home in Penarth on 19 January 1927. He attended Alpha School in Harrow and later the Bedford Modern School due to the outbreak of World War II. In 1944 Wideman obtained entrance to the City and Guilds section of the Imperial College in Kensington and was close to the centre of London throughout the V-1 and V-2 rocket attacks.

In 1947 Wideman graduated with a Bachelor of Science with Honours in civil engineering. He then spent two years performing the mandatory National Service for the British Government that was required of every male at that time. After initial training Wideman was sent to Lüneburg in Germany as a Lance Bombardier in the Royal Artillery. He also spent time during this period teaching basic education subjects to enlisted soldiers in the British Army.

Upon completion of his service in 1949, Wideman then worked for the Demolition and Construction Company. His first job was a contract for modernizing and expanding a steel mill in Scunthorpe in North Lincolnshire. Wideman was registered as a pupil engineer under agreement for two years while qualifying for his membership in the Institution of Civil Engineers. To complete the qualifying requirements prior to taking the final exam for the Institution of Civil Engineers, Wideman moved to the British colony of Northern Rhodesia in 1951 to work for the Colonial Service in the Department of Water Development and Irrigation.

From 1955 to 1966, Wideman resided in England working for Sir Murdoch Macdonald & Partners, London, UK, and later for John Mowlem & Co. Ltd, London, UK. In 1961 he was promoted to the position of Construction Agent (Site Construction Manager).

From 1966 Wideman resided in Canada, living in the cities of Toronto, Victoria, and Vancouver. He held a number of professional titles including project manager, project director, vice president, and principal. From 1990, Wideman provided project management consulting through his own company, AEW Services.

Wideman died on 14 June 2026, at the age of 99.

== Project management ==
Wideman was active in the United States based Project Management Institute (PMI) since 1974. In the mid-1980s, he led a team of 80 PMI volunteers across North America to document the institute's project management body of knowledge, known as "The PMBoK" (The Project Management Body of Knowledge). It was approved and published by PMI in 1987. This document has since been upgraded seven times by the distribution of "A Guide to the PMBoK". Subsequent to this original PMBoK work, he was elected president and then Chairman of the PMI Board. He was honoured with Fellow, Project Management Institute.

Wideman is author of several books on project management. These include: A Framework for Project and Program Management Integration (1991) and Project and Program Risk Management: A Guide to Managing Project Risks and Opportunities (1992) as PMI's handbooks; Cost Control of Capital Projects (Second Edition 1995) and his latest book A Management Framework for Project, Program and Portfolio Integration (2004).

In later years he dedicated his spare time to researching for alternative practices in project management across the entire PMBoK spectrum. This includes the emerging discipline of project portfolio management. He made this information available to the public on his web site.

== Wideman Education Foundation ==
In November 2004 the Canadian West Coast Chapter of PMI established an independent education foundation, later named after Wideman. This was due to Wideman's donation of the proceeds of his book, 'A Framework for Project and Program Management Integration' to the Canadian West Coast Chapter. After PMI HQ ceased selling the book in 2004 the subsequent royalties, in the amount $51,000.00, were used as the seed money to start the Wideman Education Foundation.

The foundation's mission is, "To teach, develop, promote, and encourage the use of proven, successful project management skills that are needed everyday by everyone."

Wideman continued to be involved with the foundation and held a seat on the board of directors.

== Awards ==
- Fellow, Institution of Civil Engineers, UK, 1969
- Fellow, Engineering Institute of Canada, 1977
- Distinguished Contribution, Project Management Institute 1985
- Person of the Year, Project Management Institute 1986
- Professional Service Award, Association of Professional Engineers of BC, 1988
- Fellow, Project Management Institute, 1989
- Fellow, Canadian Society of Civil Engineers, 1994

== Offices ==
- Engineering Institute of Canada Vice-President Ontario Region, 1973–1974
- Founding President, Canadian West Coast Chapter of the Project Management Institute, 1979
- Project Management Institute Vice-President Member Services, 1984–1986
- Project Management Institute President, 1987
- Project Management Institute Chairman of the Board, 1988
- Founding Sponsor & Secretary, The Wideman Education Foundation, 2007

== Bibliography ==
- A Framework for Project and Program Management Integration (1991) (ISBN 978-1880410011)
- Project and Program Risk Management: A Guide to Managing Project Risks and Opportunities (1992) (ISBN 978-1880410066)
- Cost Control of Capital Projects (Second Edition 1995) (ISBN 0-921095-35-X)
- A Management Framework for Project, Program and Portfolio Integration (2004) (ISBN 141202786-1)
