= Stephen Walker (journalist) =

Northern Irish journalist and author (1964/1965–2026)

- Born: 1964 or 1965; England
- Died: 6 September 2026 (aged 61)
- Children: 3

Stephen Walker (1964 or 1965 – 6 September 2026) was an English-born Northern Irish journalist and author. He worked for BBC Northern Ireland. He published five non-fiction books, including accounts of the roles of John Hume and David Trimble in the Northern Ireland peace process.

== Early life and career ==
Walker joined the BBC in 1989 as a reporter with Radio Leeds and moved to BBC Northern Ireland in 1991. During his time there he covered major events, including the Shankill bombing, the ceasefires, and the Good Friday Agreement. He left the BBC in 2023.

Walker wrote two biographies on key figures in the Good Friday Agreement: John Hume: The Persuader (2023) and David Trimble: Peacemaker (2025). He also published books on military history.

== Awards and honours ==
Walker's Spotlight work on The BlackCatch and The Life and Death of an IRA Quartermaster earned a European Journalism Award in 1995 and a Royal Television Society Award in 2001.

Walker was named Northern Ireland Journalist of the Year by the CIPR in 2005. He also contributed to BBC Newsline's coverage of Ian Paisley's death, which received an Irish Film and Television Award in 2015.

== Personal life ==
Walker was married and had three children. He was a supporter of Irish League club Ballymena United.

=== Death and tributes ===
Walker died at his home on 6 September 2026, aged 61.

Michelle O'Neill, First Minister of Northern Ireland, described him as "a real gentleman" and "a pleasure to chat with". Gavin Robinson, leader of the Democratic Unionist Party, referred to him as a "highly respected journalist" and a "gifted author". Claire Hanna, SDLP leader, said he "brought warmth and good humour to his work". Adam Smyth, director of BBC Northern Ireland, noted that he was a "great writer, broadcaster and biographer". John Hume Jnr said Walker was "a courageous, professional and dedicated journalist", calling him "a witness to a challenging history throughout the Troubles".

== Bibliography ==
- Forgotten Solders: The Irishmen Shot at Dawn (2007). Gill & Macmillan.
- Hide & Seek: The Irish Priest in the Vatican who Defied the Nazi Command (2011). HarperCollins.
- Ireland's Call: Irish Sporting Heroes Who Fell in the Great War (2015). Merrion Press.
- John Hume: The Persuader (2023). Gill Books.
- David Trimble: Peacemaker (2025). Gill Books.
