= Mary Hooper (author, born 1944) =

British children's author (1944–2026)

- Born: 23 July 1944; Barnes, England
- Died: 24 May 2026 (aged 81)
- Education: University of Reading
- Occupation: Children's author

Mary Hooper (23 July 1944 – 24 May 2026) was a British children's author.

A graduate of the University of Reading, she made her writing debut in 1978 with Jodie. She primarily focused on writing historical fiction.

Hooper died on 24 May 2026, aged 81.

== Publications ==
- Jodie (1978)
- My Cousin Angie (1984)
- Janey's Diary (1984)
- Cassie (1990)
- There Goes Summer (1993)
- The Lost Treasure (1996)
- Timmy and Tiger (1998)
- Megan (1999)
- Megan 2 (1999)
- Megan 3 (2001)
- Amy (2002)
- At the Sign of the Sugared Plum (2003)
- Petals in the Ashes (2004)
- The Remarkable Life and Times of Eliza Rose (2006)
- Newes From the Dead (2008)
- Fallen Grace (2010)
- Velvet (2012)
- The Disgrace of Kitty Grey (2013)
- Ring of Roses (2014)
- Poppy (2016)
