= Tessa Richards =

British physician (1950–2026)

- Born: 30 July 1950; Tunbridge Wells, Kent, England
- Died: 10 February 2026 (aged 75)
- Education: University of Leeds
- Occupation: Physician

Tessa Richards (30 July 1950 – 10 February 2026) was a British physician.

== Early life and career ==
Richards was born in Tunbridge Wells, Kent, England on 30 July 1950. Her father Kenneth Richards was a farmer and filmmaker while her mother Pamela Knight was an English teacher at Beneden School. She studied at Bruton school for girls in Somerset and did her medicine at the University of Leeds in the Guy's Hospital Medical School in London in 1973. In 1985, she married Charles Smallwood, a solicitor, and together they had three children, Nick, Christo and Poppy.

In 1993, she joined the BMJ (formerly British Medical Journal) as Assistant Editor and worked till 2023. She headed the BMJs patient partnership strategy as a senior editor.

== Death ==
Richards died of adrenal cancer on 10 February 2026, at the age of 75.
