= Brain Tumour Research =

- Founded: 2009
- Founder: Sue Farrington Smith
- Type: Charitable Organisation
- Registration no.: England and Wales: 1153487; Scotland: SC046840
- Purpose: Research and campaigning
- Headquarters: Shenley Wood, Milton Keynes
- Region served: United Kingdom
- Key people: Dan Knowles (Chief Executive); Sue Farrington Smith
- Website: www.braintumourresearch.org

Brain Tumour Research is a UK-based medical research charity dedicated to funding research, raising awareness of brain tumours.

The charity works with and funds a network of experts in sustainable research at dedicated Centres of Excellence across the UK. The charity also focuses on influencing the Government and larger cancer charities to invest more nationally.

== History ==
In 2004, an informal partnership of several regional UK charities working to raise funds for brain tumour research and support agreed to join forces under the banner of the United Brain Tumour Campaign, committing themselves to work together to increase awareness across the UK and achieve a common goal to raise funds specifically for research in the UK into the prevention and treatment of brain tumours.

The Diana Ford Trust, a charity funding brain tumour research, re-registered as Brain Tumour Research in 2008, using their cash deposits to fund first stage of a new national brain tumour research funding and awareness campaign. Brain Tumour Research was launched as a national charity in 2009.

Brain Tumour Research also acts as an umbrella organisation for a number of brain tumour charities throughout the UK.

== Research Centres of Excellence ==
=== University of Portsmouth ===
Brain Tumour Research’s inaugural Centre is led by Professor Geoff Pilkington, a world renowned expert in Neuro-oncology. His team of specialist researchers within the Cellular and Molecular Neuro-Oncology Group are made up of a principal esearch fellow, research fellows, senior research associates and PhD students. Their team is strengthened with MSc and Erasmus students. They comprise the largest team of laboratory-based brain tumour research experts in the UK.

Research at the University of Portsmouth is also supported by funds being brought in by other charities, including Ali's Dream, Charlie's Challenge, Anna's Hope, Headcase, the Ollie Young Foundation, the Dr Hadwen Trust, and Children with Cancer.

=== Queen Mary University of London ===
Professor Silvia Marino, one of the UK’s leading neuropathologists, leads the Queen Mary University of London research team (in collaboration with UCL Institute of Neurology). Their research focuses on glioblastoma multiforme (GBM), the most common and most aggressive type of brain tumour found in humans. The researchers aim to increase understanding of the brain cells from which GBMs originate: how this tumour type develops from normal cells, and which genes and biological functions control its behaviour. By uncovering this knowledge, the clinical evaluation of each individual patient can be improved and specific drugs which target the tumour cells can be identified.

=== Imperial College Healthcare NHS Trust ===
Led by Kevin O’Neill, a consultant neurosurgeon at Imperial College Healthcare NHS Trust, a team of world-class researchers are investigating the biology of tumour metabolisms to further understand the behaviour of this disease.

=== Plymouth University ===
Led by Professor Oliver Hanemann, the Plymouth University centre conducts research into low-grade brain tumours occurring in teenagers and adults. By identifying and understanding the mechanism that makes a cell become cancerous, the team explore ways in which to halt or reverse that mechanism.

== Campaigning ==
John Bercow, MP for Buckingham, Speaker of the House of Commons and Brain Tumour Research Patron established the first all-party parliamentary group (APPG) for brain tumours in July 2005. The APPG is invaluable in promoting important messages about research to parliamentarians, raising awareness of brain tumours and influencing the national spend for research into this disease.

== See also ==
- Cancer in the United Kingdom
