= Brian Rotman =

British academic (1938–2026)

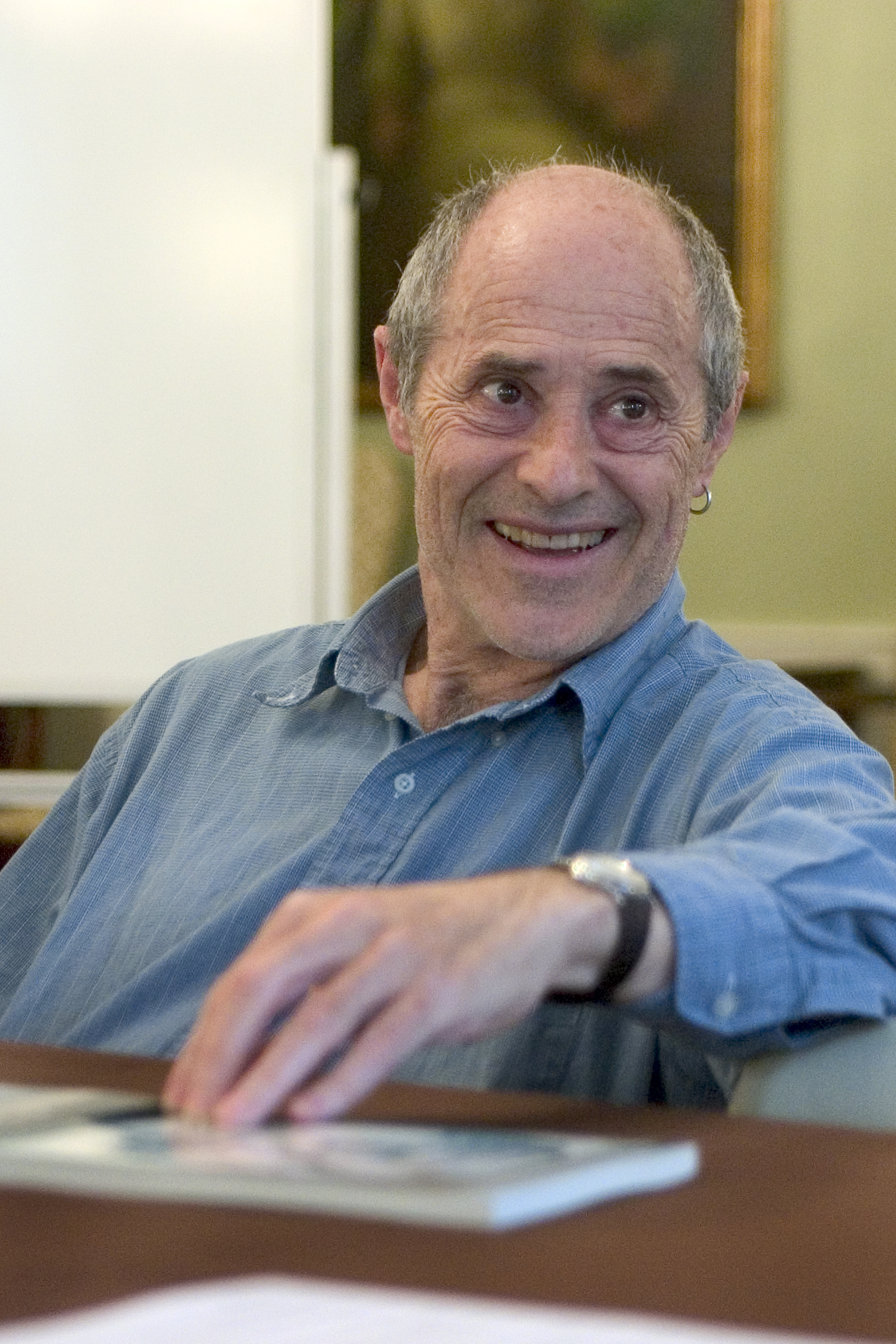
Brian Rotman

Brian Rotman (2 May 1938 – 23 January 2026) was a British academic who worked in the United States. Trained as a mathematician and later an established philosopher, Rotman blended semiotics, mathematics and the history of writing in his work and teaching throughout his career.

Rotman was later a distinguished humanities professor in the department of comparative studies at Ohio State University, also taught at Stanford, and gave lectures at universities throughout the United States including Berkeley, MIT, Brown, Stanford, Duke, Notre Dame, Penn State, Minnesota, and Cornell. Rotman’s best known books include Signifying Nothing: The Semiotics of Zero which provides a wide-ranging exploration of the zero sign, Ad Infinitum... The Ghost in Turing’s Machine, and Theory of Sets and Transfinite Numbers (written jointly with G. T. Kneebone).

== Life and career ==
Rotman was born in London, England, in 1938. He grew up above and inside his father's sweet and tobacco shop in Brick Lane in the East End of the city. He studied mathematics at the University of Nottingham, after which he taught the subject at a grammar school, a technical college and then for 20 years at Bristol University, along the way obtaining an M.Sc in the foundations of mathematics and a Ph.D in combinatorial mathematics. (Note: MSc and PhD from the University of London.) During this time he wrote, with G. T. Kneebone, a graduate textbook on set theory, The Theory of Sets and Transfinite Numbers, as well as numerous papers on ordered structures and Boolean algebras, and in 1977 published Jean Piaget: Psychologist of the Real an exposition and critique of the ideas behind Piaget's work.

In 1979 he co-founded Mouth and Trousers, a London fringe theatre company based at the York and Albany pub in Camden Town, which operated for nearly four years during which time he wrote several stage plays. In 1984 he left Bristol and mathematics teaching and worked in London as a free-lance copy writer until the stock market crash of 1987 put an end to such work. In that year his essay Signifying Nothing: the Semiotics of Zero on the cultural significance of the mathematical zero sign was published. In 1990 he and his wife Lesley Ferris, an American theatre director and academic, and their two daughters, emigrated to the United States and lived in Memphis, Tennessee, for six years. During this time, he gained expertise in the classroom training the young and spirited minds of calculus students at Memphis University School (a distinguished "school for boys") during the 1995–1996 school year.

In 1991 he published Ad Infinitum ... the Ghost in Turing's Machine, a polemic against the 'naturalness' of the natural numbers. In the following years he received fellowships from Stanford Humanities Center, the National Endowment for the Humanities, and the American Council of Learned Societies. From 1996 to 1998 he was a professor of interdisciplinary studies in the English department at Louisiana State University in Baton Rouge, Louisiana, and in 1998 moved to Columbus, Ohio, to join the faculty of the Ohio State University, first as a professor in the Advanced Computing Center for the Arts and Design (ACCAD) and then as a member of the department of Comparative Studies. His students called him both stunning and eccentric, and keen to bend disciplines.

In 2000 he published Mathematics as Sign: Writing, Imagining, Counting, a collection of essays which gathered his writings on the semiotics of mathematics.

His later work focused on the gestural dimension of thought, inner speech, and the psychic effects produced by technological media, some of which, that concerned with the medium of writing, is elaborated in the book Becoming Beside Ourselves referred to above.

In November 2012 he was invited by Goldsmiths College in London to choreograph a mathematical dance piece entitled "Ordinal 5", which was performed at the Tate Modern.

On 10 April 2026, it was announced that Rotman had died at the age of 87.
