= Kevin Sinnott =

Welsh painter (1947–2026)

Kevin Sinnott (1947 – 27 July 2026) was a Welsh painter known for his contemporary depictions of Welsh life.

== Life and career ==
Sinnott was born in Sarn, South Wales in 1947, to Irish parents.

One of his best-known paintings is Running Away with the Hairdresser (1995), which is in the collection of National Museum Wales in Cardiff.

He studied at Cardiff College of Art and Design from 1967 to 1968, Gloucester College of Art and Design from 1968 to 1971, and the Royal College of Art in London from 1971 to 1974.

Sinnott's work was acquired by major collections, including the Metropolitan Museum of Art in New York, the Arts Council of Great Britain, the Royal College of Art in London and the British Museum, as well as private and corporate collections worldwide.

He returned to Wales in 1995, where he lived and worked for the remainder of his life.

Sinnott died at his home in Pont-y-rhyl, on 27 July 2026, aged 78.

== Bibliography ==
- Kevin Sinnott, Behind the Canvas, published by Seren Books, 2008, Wales
- Interview in Welsh Painters Talking, edited by Tony Curtis, Seren Books, 1997, Wales

== Interviews ==
- Kevin Sinnott & Running Away with the Hairdresser [Framing Wales: Art in the 20th Century, BBC Two, 2011]
