= Richard Meier (poet) =

English poet (1970–2025)

- Born: 17 March 1970; Great Bookham, Surrey, England
- Died: 17 December 2025 (aged 55); East Finchley, London, England
- Education: Chetham's School of Music
- Occupation: Poet

Richard Meier (17 March 1970 – 17 December 2025) was an English poet. He won the 2010 Picador Poetry Prize. He authored two poetry collections, and his poems also appeared in Oxford Poets 2002: An Anthology and in Granta. Meier died from lung cancer in East Finchley, London, on 17 December 2025, at the age of 55.

== Selected works ==
- Meier, Richard (2012). Misadventure. London, U.K.: Picador. ISBN 9781447208464.
- Meier, Richard (2019). Search Party. London, U.K.: Picador. ISBN 9781509851980.
