= George Dunn (RAF officer) =

British Royal Air Force officer (1922–2026)

- Born: George Charles Dunn; 21 September 1922; Whitstable, Kent, England
- Died: 28 April 2026 (aged 103); Saltdean, East Sussex, England
- Military career
- Allegiance: United Kingdom
- Branch: Royal Air Force
- Service years: 1941–1947
- Rank: Flight lieutenant
- Service number: 149315
- Conflicts: Battle of Berlin
- Awards: Distinguished Flying Cross

Flight Lieutenant George Charles Dunn DFC (21 September 1922 – 28 April 2026) was a British Royal Air Force officer who flew 44 missions for Bomber Command during the Second World War. He was awarded the Distinguished Flying Cross in 1943, and later the Legion d'Honneur.

== Biography ==
George Charles Dunn was born in Whitstable, Kent, England on 21 September 1922. He joined the Royal Air Force in June 1941, aged 18, and began his training as a wireless operator and air gunner, before re-training as a pilot in Canada. Dunn flew 30 of his missions in Handley Page Halifax bombers over industrial Germany and 14 in De Havilland Mosquito bombers over Berlin. He was awarded the Distinguished Flying Cross on 10 December 1943. Dunn left the RAF in 1947, and returned to work for Pickfords, a removal company which he worked for prior to the war.

Dunn later lived in Rottingdean, a village in East Sussex. He died at home in Saltdean on 28 April 2026, at the age of 103. Dunn was predeceased by his wife and had no children.
