= John Mocatta =

English cricketer (1936–2026)

Personal information
- Full name: John Edward Abraham Mocatta
- Born: 6 May 1936; St John's Wood, London, England
- Died: 12 October 2026 (aged 90)
- Batting: Right-handed
- Bowling: Leg break

Domestic team information
- Years: Team
- 1958: Oxford University

Career statistics
Competition	First-class
Matches	4
Runs scored	106
Batting average	13.25
100s/50s	–/–
Top score	37
Catches/stumpings	2/–
- Source: Cricinfo, 16 June 2020

John Edward Abraham Mocatta (6 May 1936 – 12 October 2026) was an English first-class cricketer.

== Biography ==
Mocatta was born in St John's Wood, London on 6 May 1936. He was educated at Clifton College, before going up to New College, Oxford. While studying at Oxford, he made four appearances in first-class cricket for Oxford University against Gloucestershire, Yorkshire, Derbyshire, and the Free Foresters. He scored 106 runs in his four matches, at an average of 13.25 and a high score of 37.

He later co-founded the Polack's House Educational Trust at Clifton College.

Mocatta died on 12 October 2026, aged 90.
