= Tony Bracegirdle =

British rose breeder and horticulturist (1942–2026)

- Born: Anthony James Bracegirdle; April 1942; Bury, Greater Manchester, England
- Died: 29 December 2025 (aged 83)
- Occupations: Rose breeder and horticulturist
- Spouse: Alice Barlow (m. 1964; died. 2024)

Anthony James Bracegirdle (April 1942 – 29 December 2025) was a British rose breeder and horticulturist.

== Life and career ==
Bracegirdle was born in Bury, Greater Manchester in April 1942, the son of James Bracegirdle, a joiner, and Edith Sanderson, a cotton mill worker. He began breeding roses in 1974, and his floribunda rose won the Torridge Award in the category Best Amateur Rose in 1983.

In 1996, Bracegirdle won the Royal National Rose Society Open Championships. In 2006, The Guardian described Bracegirdle as having "all the breezy ebullience of Fred Dibnah".

== Personal life and death ==
In 1964, Bracegirdle married Alice Barlow. Their marriage lasted until her death in 2024.

Bracegirdle died on 29 December 2025, at the age of 83.
