= Matt Gallagher (Coventry rugby union player) =

English rugby union player (1973–2026)

Matthew David Gallagher (21 March 1973 – 8 March 2026) was an English rugby union player.

== Biography ==
Gallagher began his rugby career with Solihull Rugby Club before joining the Birmingham Bees after turning 18. He later attended Sheffield Hallam University, where he won the British Polytechnic Cup twice. He subsequently joined Nottingham Rugby Club, and then moved to Coventry R.F.C. in 1996, remaining there until 2001.

In June 2023, Gallagher fell from a ladder and underwent surgery on his arm. Following the operation, he was diagnosed with motor neurone disease. After his diagnosis, he founded the Matt Gallagher Foundation to support people living with the condition.

Gallagher died from complications of motor neurone disease on 8 March 2026, aged 52.
