= Ralph Ottey =

Jamaican-born British author and World War II veteran (1924–2026

Ralph Ottey (17 February 1924 – 10 May 2026) was a Jamaican-born British author and Second World War veteran.

== Biography ==
Ralph Ottey was born in Little London, Jamaica on 17 February 1924. He relocated to the United Kingdom in 1944, and joined the Royal Air Force, being assigned to the 617 (Dambusters) Squadron at RAF Woodhall Spa. He served as a driver with 617 Squadron at RAF Coningsby and RAF Woodhall Spa.

Following the war he resided in Boston, Lincolnshire. He became active in cricket, being known for being a fast bowler.

He wrote two books related to Boston, Memories of Boston Market Place 1949–2009 and Memories of Bargate in Boston.

Ottey celebrated his 100th birthday in February 2024, and died on 10 May 2026, aged 102.
