= Donald MacRae (singer) =

Scottish folk singer (1941–2026)

Donald MacRae (Scottish Gaelic: Dòmhnall MacRath; 26 August 1941 – 29 April 2026) was a Scottish folk singer who sang primarily in Gaelic.

== Life and career ==
MacRae was born in Stornoway on 26 August 1941, and grew up on a croft at Habost in the district of South Lochs on the Isle of Lewis. At the age of 12, he moved with his family to a croft at Carishader, and during his high school years lived at the Gibson Hostel in Stornoway. After leaving school, he moved back to Carishader for four years to work on the croft.

In 1961, MacRae moved to Glasgow and worked on buses for about six months, before being employed at the Singer Company sewing machine factory in Clydebank for 19 years until the factory's closure in 1980. It was during this time that he began singing native Lewis songs at venues in Glasgow and the Outer Hebrides. Afterwards, he worked at Barr and Stroud in the field of optical engineering until 1991, and then worked for three years at the J.M. Campbell company in Bridgeton. Later, he worked at the Bar Knight Precision Engineers company in Clydebank.

MacRae began singing at the Park Bar in Glasgow in 1965, and sang there regularly for 33 years. He later sang at the Islay Inn for several years. He recorded several records with Gaelfonn, Bluebell, Thistle, Lismor, and Smith & Mearns labels, and released three albums: Donald MacRae Sings (1975), Hebridean Journey (1976), and Do M' Chàirdean (1977, re-released 2012).

MacRae died on 29 April 2026, at the age of 84.

== Discography ==
- Donald MacRae Sings (1975)
- Hebridean Journey (1976)
- Do M' Chàirdean (1977)
- Dom Chàirdean (2012)

== Singles ==
- "Air M'Uileann 'S Mi 'N Am Aonar" / "Nighean An Tuath'naich" (1968)
- "Fal-O-Ro Mar Dh'Fhag Sinn" / "A Challum Bhigh Na Piseagan" (1968)
- "My Own Lewis Isle" / "My Isle - Tiree" (1968)
