= Sheila Mathews =

English actress, singer, dancer and presenter (1927–2026)

- Mathews in 1957
- Born: Sheila Reta Mathews; 31 May 1927; Edmonton, Essex, England
- Died: 11 August 2026 (aged 99); Southwick, West Sussex, England
- Occupation: Actress • singer • dancer • presenter
- Years active: 1930–2020s
- Spouse(s): Bill Bender (m. 1951, divorced) Charles Reading (m. 1957; died 1999)
- Children: 2

Sheila Reta Mathews (31 May 1927 – 11 August 2026) was an English actress, singer, dancer and presenter with a career on stage and screen of over 90 years believed by Equity to be the longest ever in the entertainment business.

== Early life ==
Sheila Reta Mathews was born on 31 May 1927 in Edmonton to bank clerk Walter Mathews and his wife Reta (née Adamson).

During her childhood, she took part in song-and-dance displays at the Finsbury Park Empire. Once, singing coach Marion Brown was in the audience and offered her free tuition as her mother could not afford to pay for lessons.

== Career ==
Mathews began her career at the age of three when she appeared as Bebe Sheila in a group of young dancers called The Rosebuds at the Alexandra Palace (London) in June 1930.

In 1943, aged 16, she appeared in West End's Strike a New Note in which she danced with Eric Morecambe, then known as Eric Bartholomew.

In 1950, she took part in the 21st Royal Variety Performance at the London Palladium which was attended by King George VI, Queen Elizabeth and their daughters Princesses Elizabeth (who later became Queen Elizabeth II) and Margaret. Mathews had also been presented to Queen Mary after a performance in 1948.

In 1955, she appeared in ITV's opening-night gala.

In June 2023, she received the Lifetime Achievement award from the British Music Hall Society.

== Personal life and death ==
In 1948, Mathews was engaged to comedian Peter Waring but their marriage was called off the following year due to Waring being a con-artist. She moved to the US in 1951 where she married and divorced American singer Victor "Bill" Bender. She returned to England in 1955. In 1957, she married actor, writer, director, and designer Charles Reading (1911–1999) with whom she had two daughters, Sally and Jane.

Mathews died at home in Southwick, West Sussex, with her daughter Sally at her bedside, on 11 August 2026, following a series of strokes. She was 99.
