= Asteryth Sloane =

British composer (2000–2026)

Xia Leon Sloane
- Born: Alexia Sloane; 2000
- Died: c. 23 July 2026 (aged 26)
- Occupations: Composer; Poet
- Website: http://www.inspirarts.com/

Asteryth Sloane (born Alexia Leon Sloane; 2000 – c. 23 July 2026) was a British composer of contemporary classical music and a poet. They were the winner of the 2016 Cambridge Young Composer of the Year competition and also one of seven winners of the Classic FM/Royal Philharmonic Society 25th Birthday Commissions in 2017. In 2018 they won the senior category of the BBC Proms Inspire Young Composers' competition.

== Composer ==
Sloane began composing music through improvisation at the age of six and started taking formal lessons when they were twelve. Common themes that run through their compositions are those of nature (particularly climate change), philosophy and psychology, taking much inspiration from Buddhist, environmental and synaesthetic imagery. As well as vocal music, they enjoyed writing for unusual combinations of instruments and the setting of texts from languages and cultures such as Basque and Mandarin Chinese. Sloane saw the arts as a means through which people could reconnect and this was the focus of much of their work. The use and effect of silence in music fascinated them, as did the use of music as a form of deep self-expression.

Their compositional method was to strongly imagine the pitches they wish to be played or sung, away from any instrument. They then wrote the pitches down in Braille music notation before dictating them to an amanuensis who transcribed them onto notation software.

Sloane was an Aldeburgh Young Musician from 2015 to 2016 and studied Composition at the Royal College of Music Junior Department in London from 2016 to 2018. During that time they were also a composer with the National Youth Orchestra of Great Britain and the Britten Sinfonia Academy. In 2018, they began studying Composition at the Royal Northern College of Music, Manchester, where they held a scholarship, under the tutelage of Professor Emily Howard.

In 2016, Sloane was the first female composer to win The Cambridge Young Composer of the Year Competition with the piece Passiflora. In 2017 they were one of seven winners of the Classic FM/Royal Philharmonic Society 25th Birthday Commissions and also won the Royal College of Music Junior Department Joan Weller Composition Prize. The following year they were awarded the Humphrey Searle Composition Prize, again by the RCM Junior Department.

Their choral piece Longing for Equinox was highly commended in the 2017 BBC Proms Inspire Young Composers' Competition and they won the senior category of that same competition in 2018 with their piece Elegy for Aylan. As a result, the piece was performed by the Aurora Orchestra in August 2018 as part of the BBC Proms series. In July 2019 Sloane made their official Proms debut with their BBC-commissioned piece, Earthward, which was performed by VOCES8 at Cadogan Hall. Sloane was also an ambassador for the BBC Proms Inspire Competition.

== Poet ==
Sloane began writing poetry at an early age. In 2014 they were the 14 and under Category Winner of The Stephen Spender Prize for Poetry in Translation and, aged sixteen, self-published Hushed Skies, an anthology of their own verse. Sloane often used their own poems as a source of inspiration to inspire some of their compositions.

== Personal life ==
Sloane announced in August 2020 via their Twitter account that they had changed their name to Xia Leon Sloane.

Sloane had been blind from the age of two.

The Royal Northern College of Music announced Sloane's death on 23 July 2026, at the age of 26.
