= The Master Singers =

British vocal group

- Origin: Abingdon School, England
- Genres: Anglican chant, novelty records
- Years active: 1963–67
- Label: Parlophone Records
- Past members: John Horrex; George Pratt; Geoff Keating; Barry Montague; Mike Warrington

The Master Singers were a British vocal group in the 1960s. Comprising four schoolmasters, they specialised in comedic recordings of mundane documents and announcements such as the radio weather forecast and the Highway Code, performed a cappella as Anglican chant. Two of their records, "Highway Code" and "Weather Forecast", both produced by George Martin, reached the UK singles chart in 1966.

== History ==
The original setting of the Highway Code in Anglican chant was devised by John Horrex, a teacher at Abingdon School, in the late 1950s. He performed it with various friends at local church and school social events for several years. In 1963, to celebrate the school's tercentenary, Horrex with three other teachers – George Pratt, Geoff Keating and Barry Montague – made a private recording of the Highway Code in several different styles. A copy of the recording reached broadcaster and humourist Fritz Spiegl, who in turn passed it to the BBC where it was played on a radio show hosted by Winston Churchill, the grandson of the former prime minister.

The group were then contracted to record for Parlophone Records. They first appeared on record in late 1965 with Peter Sellers on his version of the Beatles' "Help!", which was released as the B-side of his version of "A Hard Day's Night", produced by George Martin. The group also recorded Christmas carols with Cliff Richard; some of the recordings were used, but the Twelve Days of Christmas was too long for the EP side. That carol was played to another popular vocal group, The King's Singers, who then asked Keating to arrange carols on their own recordings.

"The Highway Code", arranged by Horrex and Keating and produced by George Martin, was released in April 1966, and rose to No. 25 on the UK singles chart. The arrangement makes use of four Anglican chants, composed by W. H. Havergal, E. J. Hopkins, William Felton and J. T. Harris.

They followed it up with "Telephone Directory", and then "Weather Forecast", which reached no. 50, although they encountered copyright difficulties with "Telephone Directory" as the General Post Office claimed copyright on the names and telephone numbers and prohibited the group from using the directory's contents. They also recorded two songs for a Keele University charity record, The Master Singers And Shirley Kent Sing For Charec 67, and released an EP comprising two of their singles.

The group also made several television appearances. Montague left the group to move to Australia, and was replaced by Mike Warrington from Cheadle Hulme School. As the original members each left Abingdon School, and their teaching careers took them to different parts of the country – Horrex to Glasgow, Pratt to Keele, and Keating to Cheadle Hulme – the group split up.

== Later lives ==
John Horrex (1930–2013) joined the staff at The Glasgow Academy as Head of the Physics Department in January 1965, where he was also much involved in many Academy stage productions – as writer, producer, actor and technical adviser. Some 16 years later he moved to become Head of Physics at St Edmund’s School, Canterbury. He died on 18 March 2013.

Geoff Keating (1937–2026) became Director of Music at Millfield School, where he stayed for 17 years, and also taught at Sherborne School for three years before retiring to Scotland. He was conductor of the Solway Sinfonia from 1997 until 2018. Keating died on 17 April 2026, aged 88.

Barry Montague (born 1934) joined the staff of Brisbane Grammar School to teach English. He established The Grammar Singers a combined choir with the Girls' Grammar School and initiated a Service of Lessons and Carols at St John's Cathedral as well as performances of major works such as Bach St John Passion, Faure Requiem, Haydn Nelson Mass and Elgar's The Music Makers. The renowned organist Christopher Wrench accompanied the choir for many years. He retired in 2001 and lives near Brisbane in the Bayside suburb of Newport.

George Pratt (1935–2017) became Director of Music at Keele University from 1964 to 1985, where he installed an innovative organ in the new University Chapel in 1965. He was instrumental in the founding of the influential Lindsay String Quartet and secured a Leverhulme Scholarship for them to begin their careers as artists in residence at Keele. He was later Professor of Music at Huddersfield University and the author of The Dynamics of Harmony (Open University 1984). He retired to Exeter, where he died in 2017.

Mike Warrington became a head teacher in Oldham before retiring.
