= Bruno Turner =

British musicologist (1931–2026)

- Born: 7 February 1931; London, England
- Died: 9 June 2026 (aged 95)
- Occupations: Musicologist, choirmaster, conductor, broadcaster

Bruno Turner (7 February 1931 – 9 June 2026) was a British musicologist, choral conductor, broadcaster, publisher and businessman. His scholarship and recordings have focused on early music, especially of Spanish polyphony.

== Life and career ==
Turner was born in London on 7 February 1931. He was raised in a strict Catholic household, his father being a convert from the Baptists. His interest in early music was shepherded by Thurston Dart and Denis Stevens; Turner began conducting Renaissance ensembles in the 1950s. Turner worked as secretary to the Renaissance Singers, and this inspired him to establish the Pro Musica Sacra choir, which gave numerous radio broadcasts in the late 1950s. He was the director of Pro Musica Sacra from 1956 to 1964. In 1962, he facilitated a complete liturgical reconstruction (of Robert Fayrfax's Missa Tecum Principium), the first attempt to do so.

He was a Catholic choirmaster until Vatican II, a radio broadcaster from 1958, and active as conductor and speaker. From the late 1960s into the 1990s, Turner was a frequent conductor of Pro Cantione Antiqua of London, and directed many of their recordings for Archiv Produktion. He ran a family business outside of music called Turner Wallcoverings; in 1977, with Martyn Imrie, he created Mapa Mundi, a company dedicated to publishing Medieval music, a venture that again proved successful. Turner has written frequently on early music, performance practice and the rival elements in singing. In the debate on the use of vibrato in renaissance choral music, Turner has consistently advocated less vibrato, but not no vibrato. "Counterpoint is only one element in the music, there is expression too and you should allow your voice to be coloured and not sing like an automaton".

Turner was honoured with a festschrift in 2011, entitled Pure Gold: Golden Age Sacred Music in the Iberian World. A Homage to Bruno Turner, edited by Tess Knighton and Bernadette Nelson. The book was presented to Turner at the 2011 Medieval and Renaissance Music Conference in Barcelona. Reviewing in Fontes Artis Musicae, Joseph Sargent remarked, "Anyone who enjoys Spanish Renaissance music owes a debt to Bruno Turner, whose pioneering Mapa Mundi scores, groundbreaking recordings, and enlightening scholarship have vastly increased this repertory's visibility."

Turner died on 9 June 2026, at the age of 95.

== Discography ==
The 6-LP set 'The Flowering of Renaissance Polyphony' (Geistliche Musik der Renaissance') issued on Deutsche Grammophon Archiv in the late 1970s was influential.

- Ockeghem: Missa pro defunctis / Josquin des Prez - Déploration sur la mort d'Ockeghem. Pro Cantione Antiqua, London dir. Turner, Archiv Produktion 2533 145 [LP]
- Josquin - Motets. Pro Cantione Antiqua London, Tölzer Knabenchor. Bläserkreis für alte Musik Hamburg, Collegium Aureum. Bruno Turner, conductor. Harmonia Mundi HM 20339 [LP].
- Gombert - Josquin - Jheronimus Vinders Pro Cantione Antiqua, London dir. Turner, Archiv Produktion 2533 360 [LP]
- Francisco de Peñalosa. The Complete Motets. Pro Cantione Antiqua. Hyperion.
