= The Bridewell Taxis =

English indie rock band

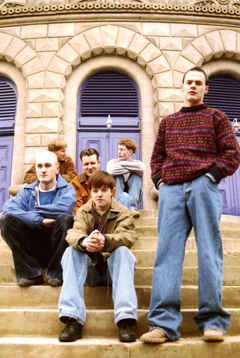

Background information
- Also known as: The Bridewells, Morality Play
- Origin: Leeds, West Yorkshire, England
- Genres: Indie rock, baggy
- Years active: 1987–1993
- Labels: Stolen Records, Expression Records
- Past members: Mick Roberts; Chris Walton; Sean McElhone; Simon Scott; Glenn Scullion; Gary Wilson; Carl A. Finlow; Alaric Neville; Keith Manasseh Jackson; Michelle Jasmin; Chris Harrop; Andrew Stocks

The Bridewell Taxis (later The Bridewells) were an English, Leeds-based indie rock group, active from 1987 to 1993. The Bridewell Taxis were briefly known as one of the few bands from east of the Pennines to make an impact on what was to become known as the Madchester scene.

== Early years ==
The group came together in Leeds during 1987 and were originally called Morality Play. Their first public performances were at an Unemployed Music project in Leeds that also helped launch other contemporary Leeds collaborations including Nightmares on Wax. At that time, Mick Roberts had been working on song lyrics and ideas with childhood friend John Halnon and Marcus Waite. After Roberts joined, the band changed its name to The Bridewell Taxis, a nickname for local police vans.

Their first gig was in 1988 at the Royal Park and their first release was a blue flexi-disc, "Lies" c/w "Just Good Friends", which was given away for free with a local fanzine.

== Releases ==
Their first EP, Just Good Friends, was released on their own Stolen Records label in autumn 1989. It reached number 18 on the UK Indie Chart. Their second single was "Give In" c/w "Whole Damn Nation" which featured a dance remix of the latter track. The band started headlining their own gigs and became regulars at venues such as the Warehouse in Leeds, The Boardwalk in Manchester and The Leadmill in Sheffield.

Their debut LP Invisible to You was a collection of previous Stolen Records releases with two new tracks. It was launched at a home town concert at Leeds Town Hall on 5 July which was also filmed for a video release. Despite its relative lack of new material, Invisible sold well and remained in the indie charts for six weeks.

Despite guitarist Sean McElhone announcing he was leaving, a pre-Christmas concert was booked at the Warehouse, Leeds on 11 December. The concert was poorly attended and beset with technical problems. The band left the stage to boos from their home town audience and split up that night.

== The Bridewells ==
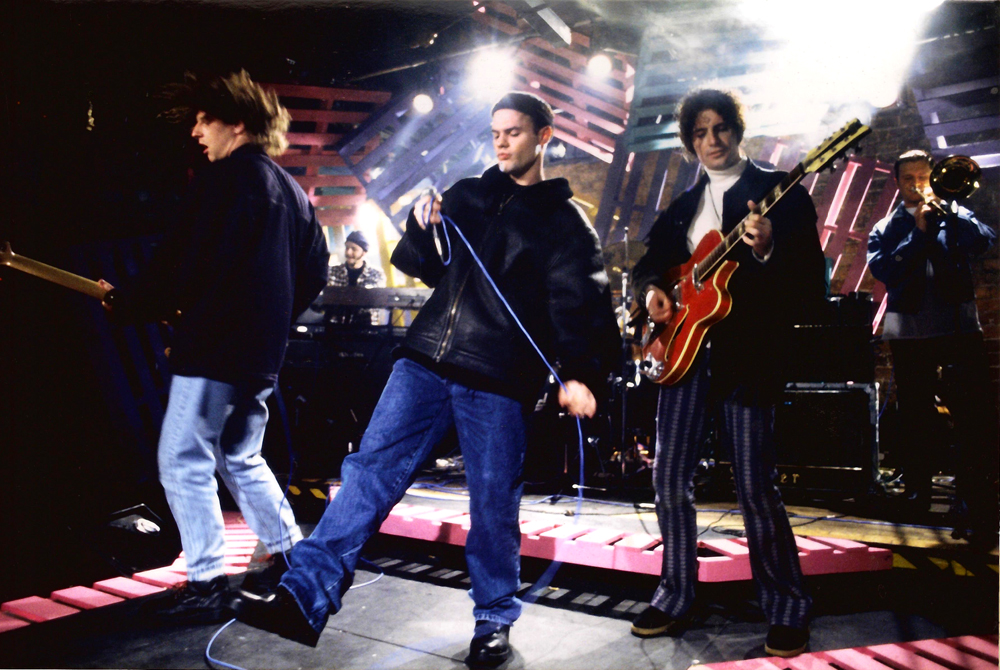
The Bridewells' final performance at the Warehouse, Leeds, March 1993.

After the breakup of the original line up, Mick Roberts, Carl A. Finlow and Alaric Neville continued to write and play together. Following a request for a Motown cover version from Imaginary Records Chris Walton re-joined. Marvin Gaye's "Inner City Blues" was demoed along with a handful of new songs. A cassette of the session found its way to Phil Manzanera, Roxy Music guitarist, studio and label owner.

The Bridewells played their first gig at the Warehouse, Leeds on 17 February 1992. An EP, Smile I Still Care was recorded at Manzanera's studio in Chertsey, West London and was released on Expression Records on 15 June. The album Cage was also released by Expression on 19 October.

It had become apparent during the recording of the album that Roberts' hearing loss was having an adverse effect on the volume he needed for monitoring and live gigs were becoming difficult. This, combined with financial troubles at Expression, effectively brought the band to a halt. Their final performance was filmed at the Warehouse for ITV featuring the album title track, "Cage" and a new song "World Stop Turning", recorded on 23 March 1993.

In 2005, Mick Roberts, Sean McElhone and Glenn Scullion got back together to play some dates. They were joined by twins James (bass) and Jools Metcalfe (guitar). The band played a sell-out reunion gig in Leeds in October 2005 and followed that with two more home town dates. The following year, the band embarked on a mini-tour, ending with a final show at Leeds University Union. The band split again in June 2006.

Mick Roberts died on 25 March 2026, at the age of 57.

== Discography ==
=== Singles and EPs ===
- Just Good Friends EP ("Just Good Friends", "Too Long", "Wild Boar", "Hold On") (Stolen, 1989)
- "Give In" c/w "Whole Damn Nation" (featuring "Whole Dance Nation" remix by Steve and Andy Williams from K-Klass) (Stolen, 1990)
- "Honesty" c/w "Aegis" (Stolen, 1990)
- "Spirit" (featuring LFO Spirit remix) (Stolen, 1990)
- "Don't Fear the Reaper" c/w "Face in the Crowd" (featuring "What Noise Reaper" remix by Chris Nagle) (Stolen, 1991)
- Smile EP (as The Bridewells) ("Smile I Still Care", "Missing Link", "World of Lies", "Return") (Expression, 1992)

=== Albums ===
- Invisible to You (Stolen, 1991)
- Cage (as The Bridewells) (Expression, 1992)
- Bridewell Revisited
- Stolen Sound People (2013)

=== Videos ===
- Precious Times: A History of The Bridewell Taxis (Stolen, 1990)
- Live at The Hacienda (Jettisoundz, 1990)
- The Invisible Smile: Live at Leeds Town Hall (Alternative Image, 1991)

=== Compilation appearances ===
- Indie Chart Hits Vol. 11 - "Spirit" (Beechwood, 1990)
- Indie Top 20 Vol. 12 - "Don't Fear the Reaper" (Beechwood, 1991)
- Knowing Where It All Leeds - "Moving Fast" (Stolen Sounds, 1991)
- The Expression She Pulled 12 - "World Stop Turning" (as The Bridewells) (ESP, 1992)
- The Expression She Pulled 14 - "Shame" (as The Bridewells) (ESP, 1993)
- United City - "Girl" (as The Bridewells) (Soundcity, 2007)

=== TV appearance ===
- The Warehouse - "Cage" and "World Stop Turning" (as The Bridewells) (recorded 23 March, broadcast 30 April, ITV, 1993)
