= 2026 in England =

- Centuries: 19th; 20th; 21st
- Decades: 2000s; 2010s; 2020s
- See also: 2025–26 in English football 2026–27 in English football 2026 in the United Kingdom; Other events of 2026

Events of the year 2026 in England.

== Incumbent ==
- Monarch – Charles III
- Prime Minister – Keir Starmer (until 20 July), Andy Burnham (since 20 July)

== Events ==
=== January ===
- 1 January – Convicted murderer Matthew Armstrong and two other prisoners, Daniel Washbourne and Aaron Thomas, abscond from HMP Leyhill in Gloucestershire.
- 2 January –
  - The Brighton Pier Group announces that it is putting the Brighton Palace Pier up for sale.
  - The number of flu cases is reported to have fallen, with the latest figures showing 2,676 people were in hospital with the virus, compared to just over 3,000 during the previous week.
  - HM Coastguard recover the bodies of a man and a woman after the man tried to rescue a mother and her teenage daughter who got into difficulty in the sea at Withernsea, East Yorkshire. A search for the girl is called off the following day. The body of the girl is recovered on 16 January.
- 3 January –
  - Damage to a gas pipe causes a gas outage in the Kingsbridge, Malborough and Salcombe areas of Devon.
  - Aaron Thomas, who escaped from HMP Leyhill on New Year's Day, is recaptured in Bristol.
- 6 January –
  - Fresh warnings for snow and ice are issued as Storm Goretti approaches England.
  - The annual animal count at London Zoo begins.
  - Jake Fahri, who was convicted of the 2008 murder of Jimmy Mizen, is recommended for open prison by the Parole Board.
  - A mother has been charged with murdering her four-year-old daughter in a house fire in Manchester.
  - Staff at two primary schools in Greater Manchester strike over claims their reports of violence and daily assaults are being ignored by senior leadership.
- 7 January –
  - Matthew Armstrong and Daniel Washbourne, who escaped from HMP Leyhill on New Year's Day, are recaptured, in Henley-in-Arden, Warwickshire and Bristol City Centre respectively.
  - A man is killed in a hit and run in Poole.
  - Three schoolchildren are injured after falling through an upstairs window of a double-decker bus in Ashton-in-Makerfield, Greater Manchester.
  - Former England striker and manager Kevin Keegan reveals he has been diagnosed with cancer.
- 8 January –
  - The UK government announces plans to give councils in England greater powers to fine motorists who cause disruption by parking on pavements.
  - Former English Premier League referee David Coote is sentenced to nine months in prison suspended for two years over a sexually explicit video of a teenage boy that was found on his laptop.
- 9 January –
  - At a hearing at Norwich Crown Court, Rodney Johnston is sentenced to life imprisonment with a minimum term of 16 years after he was earlier convicted of coercing a woman to have sex with more than 100 strangers over a period of three decades.
  - At a hearing at Blackburn Magistrates' Court, a 60-year-old man pleads guilty to sending abusive messages over social media to England footballer Jess Carter during the 2025 UEFA Women's Euros.
- 10 January –
  - Devon and Cornwall Police confirm that a man was found dead after a tree fell on a caravan at Helston during Storm Goretti.
  - Three men are arrested after five emergency responders were struck by vehicles while attending an accident in South Benfleet, Essex.
- 11 January –
  - Four people are killed and five are injured in a car crash in Bolton, Greater Manchester.
  - A cyclist is killed in a road incident in Bristol.
  - Five people are arrested on suspicion of murder after a man is found dead in Stockton-on-Tees.
- 13 January – John McDonald, who knocked down and fatally injured Suzanne Cherry at Aston Wood Golf Course in Staffordshire while being pursued by police, is sentenced to 13 years and six months in prison.
- 14 January – Steve Wright, convicted of the 2006 Ipswich murders, is charged with the murder of Victoria Hall, who disappeared after a night out in Felixstowe in 1999.
- 15 January –
  - Jazz Reid, who posed as a fake Deliveroo driver and shot a man and his daughter while they sat in a car with other relatives at Ladbroke Grove in November 2024, is sentenced to 38 years in prison after earlier being convicted of attempted murder of the man and wounding the girl.
  - Zoe Treadwell, who killed a motorcyclist by mowing him down in a Range Rover in Bournemouth in April 2025, is sentenced to life imprisonment with a minimum term of 35 years following her conviction for his murder.
- 16 January
  - Craig Guildford, Chief Constable of West Midlands Police, retires "with immediate effect", after controversy over his decision to ban Israeli football fans from a football match. Much later it is revealed he received a "golden goodbye" of £57,800.
  - A tribunal finds that eight female nurses at Darlington Memorial Hospital had their dignity violated after a transgender woman was allowed to use their changing room.
- 17 January – GPs in England are to be advised to seek a second opinion if a patient remains undiagnosed after three visits with the same symptoms.
- 19 January –
  - At a hearing at Northampton Crown Court, imam Ashraf Osmani is sentenced to fifteen weeks in prison, suspended for 12 months, for marrying two 16-year-olds in Northampton Central Mosque in November 2023, several months after the legal age for marriage in England was raised to 18. Osmani had claimed to be unaware of the law change at the time.
  - Surrey Police begin a murder investigation following the fatal stabbing of a 15-year-old boy in woodland at Guildford.
- 20 January – Former prison officer Isabelle Dale, who had affairs with two prisoners while working at HMP Coldingley in Surrey and plotted to smuggle drugs into another prison with one of the men, is sentenced to three and a half years in prison.
- 21 January –
  - Following a trial at Gloucester Crown Court, mother-of-ten Mandy Wixon is convicted of holding a woman with learning difficulties captive and using her as a slave for 25 years. She is released on bail, and will be sentenced on 12 March.
  - The body of one of two Christmas Day swimmers who went missing near Exmouth, Devon, is recovered, police confirm.
- 22 January –
  - An inquest into the death of Paul Lumber, a painter and decorator from Bedminster, Bristol, hears how he suffered fatal injuries after climbing a lamppost to attach a union flag while intoxicated on 22 November 2025, and after watching a football match. The inquest delivers a verdict of accidental death.
  - Chris Watkins is removed as leader of Nuneaton and Bedworth Borough Council following a vote of no confidence over a disagreement about the postponement of local elections. Steve Hey is voted in to replace him.
- 23 January –
  - At a hearing at Winchester Crown Court, former Swindon Borough Councillor Philip Young pleads guilty to a string of charges, including rape, sexual assault, assault by penetration and voyeurism, committed against his former wife over a number of years, taking 27 minutes to enter his pleas.
  - A BBC investigation finds several hundred illegal rubbish dumps operating throughout England, including eleven "super sites".
  - Two teenage boys, aged 15 and 16, are charged with the murder of a 15-year-old boy at Guildford on 19 January.
- 24 January –
  - Parts of Teignmouth Grand Pier in Devon are destroyed in Storm Ingrid.
  - The derelict St Joseph's Convent, Salford is destroyed by fire.
- 26 January – At a hearing at Northampton Crown Court, former prison officer Alicia Novas, who admitted to having a relationship with a prisoner at HMP Five Wells and smuggling cannabis into the prison, is sentenced to three years in custody.
- 28 January – Following a trial at Wood Green Crown Court, singer Ross Wild is convicted of rape and attempted rape.
- 29 January –
  - At a hearing at Birmingham Crown Court, a 15-year-old boy, who cannot be named for legal reasons, pleads guilty to the murder of 12-year-old Leo Ross, who was fatally stabbed as he walked home from school on 21 January 2025 in Yardley, Birmingham.
  - Edward Harris announces his resignation as chair of Warwickshire County Council, and as a member of Reform UK, after illegally running two unsafe rental properties in Tamworth.
- 30 January –
  - At an Old Bailey hearing, Anthony Gilheaney, who was earlier convicted of murder after killing one person and mowing down four others during a rampage through the West End in the early hours of Christmas Day 2024, is sentenced to life imprisonment with a minimum term of 37 years.
  - Manchester Pride is to go ahead in 2026 under new management after the previous organisation managing the event went into administration.

=== February ===
- 1 February –
  - A fire breaks out in the endoscopy department of Southampton General Hospital forcing the evacuation of 200 patients and the cancellation of operations.
  - A man is arrested on suspicion of murder following the fatal stabbing of a 50-year-old woman on a street in Willesden, north west London.
- 2 February –
  - Resident doctors in England vote in favour of further strike action in their long-running dispute with the UK government over pay and training posts.
  - Former prison officer Charlotte Winstanley, who had a "substantial sexual relationship" with an inmate while working at HMP Lindholme and smuggled a range of contraband goods into the prison, is sentenced to two and a half years in prison.
- 4 February –
  - Rail journeys on Southern Trains, Thameslink and the Gatwick Express are severely disrupted following an early morning derailment, and a signal failure, in south east London.
  - At a hearing at Leicester Crown Court, Jon Rubin, who laced sweets with tranquilisers at a children's summer camp and gave them to children so he could abuse them, pleads guilty to sedating his wife so she would not wake up while the abuse was taking place.
  - Tesco apologises after Welsh language signs were placed in its Helston branch in Cornwall, rather than Cornish language signs.
- 5 February – Following a trial at Lincoln Crown Court, Deividas Skebas is found guilty of the murder of nine-year-old Lilia Valutyte, who he stabbed in a random attack outside the shop where her mother worked in Boston, Lincolnshire, on 28 July 2022.
- 6 February –
  - Convicted serial killer Steven Wright is sentenced for the 1999 murder of Victoria Hall.
  - Jon Ruben is sentenced to 23 years in custody.
  - An 18-year-old man is charged with murder following the fatal stabbing of a student near De Montford University in Leicester.
- 7 February –
  - A 58-year-old man is charged with 33 sexual offences against women committed in south London between 2003 and 2019.
  - An 18-year-old man is remanded in custody charged with the murder of a student at De Montford University in Leicester.
- 8 February – David Taylor, a Worcestershire County Councillor for Redditch East, announces his resignation from Reform UK over the council's plan to increase council tax by 10% from April. Taylor will sit as an independent.
- 9 February –
  - The UK government says it will spend £5bn paying off 90% of debts built up by local authorities in England covering the cost of children and young people with special educational needs and disabilities.
  - Former nursery worker Nathan Bennett is found guilty of sexually abusing children in his care at a nursery in Bristol.
  - A 44-year-old woman drowns in a stream in Hereford.
- 10 February –
  - A 13-year-old boy is arrested on suspicion of attempted murder after two teenagers are stabbed at Kingsbury High School in north west London.
  - A 15-year-old boy is sentenced to life imprisonment with a minimum term of 13 years for the murder of Leo Ross in Birmingham.
  - Following a trial at Warwick Crown Court, Afghan asylum seeker Ahmad Mulakhil is found guilty of the abduction and rape of a 12-year-old girl in Nuneaton. A co-defendant who stood trial with Mulakhil is found not guilty.
- 11 February –
  - At a hearing a Westminster Magistrates Court, Charles Brohiri, who made 112 train journeys over two years without paying the fare, is sentenced to three years in prison, suspended for 12 months.
  - Twelve men are charged with the manslaughter of football fan Simon Dobbin, who was left with permanent brain injuries after being assaulted at a pub in Southend-on-Sea following a Match between Southend United and Cambridge United in March 2015, and died as a result of his injuries in 2020.
- 12 February –
  - Thomas McKenna, an Essex-based lorry driver who converted blank weapons into live weapons for criminals while preparing for what he described as a "race war", is sentenced to 16 years in prison.
  - Part of the South West Coast Path that passes along the Jurassic Coast in Dorset is closed following a significant cliff fall.
  - Former prison officer Ellis Eyles, who had a relationship with a prisoner while working at HMP Deerbolt, is sentenced to eight months in custody.
- 13 February –
  - Three men are charged over the theft of a quantity of Mounjaro, estimated to be worth £1m, from a distribution centre in St Albans, Hertfordshire, on 24 January.
  - At a hearing at Bedford Crown Court, Kennedy Jimmy is sentenced to six years in prison for the rape of a teenage girl in Shefford, Bedfordshire, in 2006 after advances in DNA technology were used to convict him.
  - Three teenagers are charged over the death of Maliki Sharma, who was fatally stabbed in the Feltham area of London on 12 January. One is charged with murder and two with conspiracy to commit grievous bodily harm.
- 14 February – Police launch a murder investigation following the fatal stabbing of a 19-year-old man in a street in Peckham, south London.
- 15 February –
  - Health officials confirm at least 34 cases of a "fast spreading" strain of measles have been identified at several schools in north London.
  - Derbyshire Police confirm that a man died after entering a flooded brook following a police chase the previous day.
- 17 February –
  - Police confirm they are searching for escaped prisoner Daniel Boakye, who absconded from Lewisham Hospital on 15 February while under the supervision of prison staff, the second time he has absconded from custody in a week.
  - Seven ex-Reform councillors on Kent County Council join Rupert Lowe's Restore Britain, and form their own group on the council.
- 18 February – A 20-year-old man, subsequently named as Mason Miller, is killed in a double stabbing at a skate park in Northampton. A second person is taken to hospital in a critical condition.
- 19 February –
  - Warwickshire County Councillors Scott Cameron and Luke Cooper are expelled from the council's Reform UK group amid accusations they were about to defect to Restore Britain.
  - Amateur rapper Ashley Warren is found guilty of keeping one of two XL bully dogs that mauled his mother-in-law to death two days after the breed was banned in February 2024.
  - A man is arrested after two teenagers, subsequently named as Ethan Slater, 17, and Cherish Bean, 15, were found dead at a holiday park in East Yorkshire the previous day. A second man is later arrested in connection with the deaths.
  - Gosport funeral directors Richard Elkin and Hayley Bell, who stored 46 bodies in unrefrigerated conditions, are each sentenced to four years in prison following a trial at Portsmouth Crown Court.
  - Four people are injured after a double-decker bus veered off a road and fell onto its side on the Isle of Wight.
  - Several people are treated for minor injuries after a tram was derailed during a collision with a bus in Nottingham.
  - A 43-year-old woman and a seven-year-old girl are killed in a crash near the Hindhead Tunnel in Hampshire.
- 20 February – West Midlands Police launch a murder investigation following the fatal stabbing of an 18-year-old man outside a mosque in Smethwick. Two other people are taken to hospital after sustaining injuries in the incident.
- 21 February – Six people are arrested after a Britain First march and counter march cause "significant disruption" in Manchester city centre.
- 22 February – Firefighters from Devon and Somerset Fire and Rescue tackle a large blaze at a school in Okehampton.
- 23 February –
  - Two agriculture students from Kent, who beat a sheep to death and blew it up with bird scarers, are sentenced to two years and twenty months in prison respectively, and banned from keeping animals for ten years.
  - The Animal and Plant Health Agency warns members of the public "not to touch or pick up any dead or visibly sick birds" after around 30 swans were found dead in London Docklands, prompting concerns of an outbreak of avian flu.
  - Following a trial at Leeds Crown Court, a 16-year-old boy is found guilty of being a member of the banned neo-Nazi group The Base.
- 24 February –
  - A man is arrested after walking into a mosque with weapons, including an axe and a knife, in Greater Manchester.
  - New guidelines for GPs in England will require them to guarantee same day appointments for patients with urgent health needs.
  - Reform UK suspends Adam Mitula, who was helping the party in its campaign in the Gorton and Denton by-election, for making racist and antisemitic comments on social media.
- 26 February – Andrea Jenkyns, the Mayor of Greater Lincolnshire, announces a cut to funding for English lessons for foreign nationals from 2027, with the money redistributed to improving literacy throughout the county and helping people to find employment.

=== March ===
- 1 March – Thames Valley Police have launched a murder investigation following the fatal stabbing of a security guard at a shopping centre in Milton Keynes the day before.
- 4 March – South West Water pleads guilty to supplying water unfit for human consumption after a parasitic outbreak in Devon.
- 5 March – South East Water is fined £22m by the regulator Ofwat for multiple disruptions to water supplies in Kent and Sussex.
- 7 March – 2026 Six Nations Championship: Italy claim their first ever Six Nations win over England after defeating them 23–18.
- 11 March – A 15-year-old boy is arrested after a 14-year-old girl suffered minor injuries when she was stabbed at a school in Norwich. The boy is charged over the incident the following day.
- 12 March – At a hearing at Gloucester Crown Court, Mandy Wixon, who enslaved a woman with learning disabilities for 25 years, forcing her to clean her house, is sentenced to 13 years in prison.
- 13 March –
  - Madeleine Lonsdale, aged 18, who killed two teenagers in a high-speed car crash in June 2025, weeks after passing her driving test, is sentenced to 14 months in a young offenders' institute.
  - Following Worcestershire County Council's decision to approve a 9% rise in council tax, Farage says he wishes Reform UK "hadn't bothered" to form a minority administration there, because of its financial problems.
- 14 March – A murder investigation is launched following the death of a baby in Westminster following reports the child had fallen from a height at a property. A woman is charged with murder the following day.
- 16 March – Sean Jefferson is convicted of the murder of his five-month-old daughter, who died as a result of brain trauma in March 2022.
- 17 March –
  - A man whose body was found in a wheelie bin in a Coventry park on 13 March is named as 37-year-old Thomas Niven.
  - Reform UK council leader George Finch survives a vote of no confidence by one vote after Warwickshire County Councillors vote 27–26 against a motion proposed by the Green Party.
  - Unite the Union is fined £265,000 for breaching an injunction during the Birmingham bin strike by "slow walking" in front of waste lorries near depots.
- 18 March – Three people are charged with the murder of Thomas Niven in Coventry.
- 20 March – Dame Jenni Murray, 75, English journalist and broadcaster (Woman's Hour).
- 21 March – Professor Tom Licence, an expert in medieval history and literature at the University of East Anglia, says he has found evidence 19th Century historians missed an important part of the Battle of Hastings, notably that Harold II of England's troops arrived there by sea rather than marching across land.
- 22 March – Kent Police confirm the death of one of their officers, PC Bradley Corke, who died the previous day after being involved in a crash during an emergency callout two days earlier.
- 24 March
  - Chris Parry, Reform UK's candidate for the 2026 Hampshire and the Solent mayoral election, is suspended by the party for alleged anti-Jewish posts on social media.
  - Energy Secretary Ed Miliband announces that developers will be required to incorporate solar panels and heat pumps into all newly built homes in England from 2028, as part of a drive to reduce reliance on fossil fuels.
- 25 March –
  - The British Medical Association announces that resident doctors in England will stage a six-day strike from 7am on 7 April after talks between union representatives and the UK government broke down.
  - Nigel Dewale is given a suspended prison sentence after sending racially offensive messages to footballer Jess Carter via social media during Euro 2025.
- 27 March –
  - Afghan national Ahmad Mulakhil is sentenced to 16 years in prison for abducting and raping a 12-year-old girl in Nuneaton.
  - A 16-year-old boy from Northumberland is sentenced to three and a half years in prison, followed by a further year of supervision, after admitting to joing the banned neo-Nazi group The Base.
  - Firefighters are called to a large blaze at the Big Mill, a Grade II listed building in Leek, Staffordshire. A man is later arrested in connection to the incident.
- 28 March –
  - Seven people are injured in a vehicle ramming attack in Derby. A man in his 30s has been arrested.
  - A 26-year-old man is shot dead while sitting in a car near Euston station in central London. A suspect is seen on CCTV footage fleeing on a bike after the attack.
  - West Yorkshire Police launch a murder investigation following the death of a 16-year-old girl, subsequently named as Chloe Watson, in the Cleckheaton area of Leeds.
- 31 March –
  - At a hearing at Chelmsford Crown Court amateur rapper Ashley Warren, whose mother-in-law was mauled to death by an XL bully owned by Warren, is sentenced to ten years and three months in prison. He is also banned indefinitely from owning a dog.
  - Cleveland Police confirm that a man has been arrested for involvement in the 1998 murder of Donna Keogh.

=== April ===
- 1 April – Police in Bristol are searching for a gunman after a man was left with potentially lifechanging injuries following a shooting incident.
- 2 April –
  - Funeral director Robert Bush, who gave families the wrong ashes while the bodies of their deceased relatives were still in his parlour, pleads guilty to 30 counts of preventing a lawful and decent burial.
  - A 14-year-old boy, subsequently named as Ehosa Ogbebor, is shot dead in Woolwich, south London.
- 3 April –
  - Train services to and from London Euston are heavily impacted as engineering work begins on the West Coast Main Line over the Easter weekend, with services expected to return to normal on 8 April.
  - Hertfordshire Council is to investigate unauthorised building work in an area of outstanding natural beauty.
- 4 April – As part of a partnership with the genealogy website Ancestry.com the University of York makes 16 million historical records relating to Yorkshire available online.
- 6 April –
  - Four people are arrested following the fatal stabbing of a 26-year-old man outside a nightclub in Peckham, south London. A further two people received life-threatening injuries during the incident.
  - A new law comes into force in England banning the keeping of all primate species as pets in domestic settings.
- 7 April –
  - Resident doctors in England begin a six-day strike
  - Former police officer Mark Roberts is sentenced to two years and three months after killing motorcycle passenger Muriel Pinkney while speeding to an emergency call in Gateshead in 2022.
  - The UK government announces that Plan 2 student loans in England will be capped at 6% during the next academic year.
  - A murder investigation is launched following the fatal stabbing of a 21-year-old man, subsequently named as Finbar Sullivan, at a beauty spot in Primrose Hill, London.
  - The derelict Sherwood Hotel in Torquay is destroyed by fire.
- 9 April – At a hearing at Manchester's Minshull Street Crown Court, 19-year-old Carlo Tritta is sentenced to 28 months in prison after attempting to groom a 14-year-old girl on the gaming site Roblox.
- 10 April –
  - Two teenagers are killed after the car they were travelling in left a road bridge and crashed on to the M1 motorway near Lutterworth in Leicestershire.
  - Former England footballer Michelle Hickmott is appointed as Deputy Chief Fire Officer of Staffordshire Fire and Rescue Service.
  - A 19-year-old woman is fatally injured as a result of a dog attack at a property in Essex.
- 11 April – Surrey Police launch an investigation following the rape of a woman in her 20s after she left a nightclub in Epsom.
- 12 April –
  - North Yorkshire Police confirm that a motorcyclist was killed while competing in a competition at Scarborough the previous afternoon.
  - A man is charged with murder following the fatal stabbing of Finbar Sullivan.
- 13 April –
  - The UK government announces plans to "overhaul" school meals in England, with a ban on deep-fried foods, and restrictions on items with a high sugar content.
  - Rosie Slater, who made £4,000 by selling fake Oasis tickets online, is fined £40 and given a community order.
  - At a hearing at Birmingham Crown Court Jordan Herring, who threw his girlfriend from the fourth floor of a tower block in the city's Chelmsley Wood area in November 2022, is sentenced to five years in prison.
- 15 April –
  - Two Metropolitan Police officers are charged in connection with the death of a pregnant woman who was killed along with her unborn child in a crash with a marked police car.
  - Two people are arrested on suspicion of attempted arson after two bottles containing a suspicious liquid were thrown at the Finchley Reform Synagogue in north London.
- 16 April – The Parole Board of England and Wales approves the release of Glyn Razzell, sentenced to life imprisonment in 2003 for the murder of his wife in 2002, despite him having never revealed the location of her remains.
- 17 April – An 11-year-old boy is fatally injured when his bicycle is involved in a collision between a car and a bus in Derby.
- 18 April – Police have launched an investigation following an attempted arson attack on a business in Hendon, north London.
- 19 April
  - Police launch an investigation following an arson attack on the Kenton United Synagogue in Harrow.
  - Police arrest a woman after a car ploughs into several pedestrians in Argyll Street, Soho, leaving one woman critically ill and a man with lifechanging injuries. She is subsequently charged with attempted murder, grievous bodily harm and drink driving, and remanded in custody.
- 21 April –
  - At a hearing at Westminster Magistrates' Court, a 17-year-old boy pleads guilty to arson not endangering life over the attack on the Kenton United Synagogue.
  - At a hearing at Birmingham Crown Court, John Ashby pleads guilty to the rape and religiously aggravated abuse of a Sikh woman, changing his plea on the second day of his trial.
- 22 April –
  - Following a trial at Winchester Crown Court, Christopher Trybus is cleared of manslaughter over the death of his wife, who committed suicide in 2017. He had been accused of abusing her, and is also cleared of coercive and controlling behaviour.
  - Warwickshire Police seize a car near Bedworth after discovering the 64-year-old driver had been driving for "nearly 48 years without a valid licence".
- 23 April –
  - Three men are convicted of raping a woman on Brighton beach in what has been described as a "cynical, predatory and callous attack".
  - Surrey Police finish their investigation into allegations that a rape took place outside a church in Epsom, concluding that no sexual offence took place.
  - Network Rail has applies for permission to convert a goods lift into a passenger lift at Pokesdown railway station.
- 24 April – John Ashby is sentenced to life imprisonment with a minimum term of 14 years.
- 25 April
  - Klaudia Zakrzewska, the woman left critically injured after a car was driven into pedestrians in Argyll Street, Soho, on 19 April, subsequently dies of her injuries. The suspect, a 29-year-old woman, is expected to have her charge upgraded from attempted murder to murder.
  - A woman is arrested after two children died in a house fire in Wolverhampton.
  - Two people are arrested after a motorcyclist is killed in a collision on Northam Bridge across the River Itchen in Southampton.
  - A woman and child have died after getting into difficulty in water at Elthorne Park in Ealing, west Lonson.
- 26 April –
  - A man is arrested on suspicion of arson with intent to endanger life after a fire at Pink Punters, an LGBT+ nightclub at Fenny Stratford near Milton Keynes.
  - The derelict Newell House School in Sherborne is destroyed in a fire.
- 27 April – John Cotton, leader of Birmingham City Council, says an end to the 14-month-old Birmingham bin strike is "within sight".
- 28 April – Leicester-based doctor Mohsen Ali is struck off after running an unregistered clinic and charging cancer patients £15,000 for bogus "cures" with garlic oil and vitamin C.
- 29 April –
  - Nine people are arrested over allegations of serious sexual offences, forced marriage and modern slavery among members of religious group the Ahmadi Religion of Peace and Light in Crewe.
  - At the Old Bailey, Nancy Pexton is found guilty of the murder of her sister, film director Jennifer Abbott, after slashing her neck and stealing a diamond encrusted Rolex watch belonging to her in June 2025.
  - Chelsea captain Millie Bright announces her retirement from professional football.
  - Darren Coffey is sentenced to 18 months in prison for stealing a D6 Caterpillar bulldozer, driving it through Wolverhampton city centre and crashing into a Royal Mail van in November 2025.
- 30 April
  - Three teenagers – two boys and a girl – who lured a man, Alexander Cashford, to a beach in Kent in August 2025 and killed him in the belief he was a paedophile, are sentenced to between five and seven years.
  - The 30-storey Altura tower, set to become the tallest residential building in Lancashire, receives planning approval from Preston City Council.

=== May ===
- 1 May –
  - The Renters' Rights Act comes into effect across England, banning no-fault evictions and improving security for 11 million private renters.
  - A woman whose vehicle crashed into a school in Wimbledon, south west London, in July 2023, resulting in the deaths of two girls, is charged over the incident.
  - Bomb disposal experts carry out a controlled explosion on a large World War II bomb that was discovered on a building site in Plymouth. 1,200 nearby residents were evacuated as a safety precaution before the detonation took place.
  - Nancy Pexton is sentenced to life imprisonment with a minimum term of 22 years for the murder of her sister, Jennifer Abbott.
  - A show by comedian Peter Kay at Birmingham's Utilita Arena is cut short following a bomb hoax at the venue, which requires its evacuation. A 19-year-old man is arrested in connection with the incident.
- 2 May – Four people are hospitalised with gunshot wounds after a drive-by shooting in Brixton, south London, in the early hours of the morning. One of the four victims, a 25-year-old man, subsequently dies from his injuries, triggering a murder investigation.
- 3 May – Forty people are trapped for several hours at the top of Blackpool Tower after the facility's lift breaks down.
- 4 May – A man appears in court charged with sending a false communication to police over the Peter Kay bomb scare. He is removed from the court after becoming disruptive, and remanded in custody.
- 5 May – Reform UK launches an investigation into Phil Tierney, a candidate for Chelmsley Wood in the 2026 Solihull Metropolitan Borough Council election following a social media post in which he said all mosques should be closed.
- 7 May – Following earlier trials, England's first drone deliveries for everyday shopping begin, with online retail giant Amazon offering a limited service in Darlington, County Durham.
- 10 May – A man is charged with assaulting three Jewish people following an incident in Enfield, north London the previous day.
- 13 May –
  - The bodies of three women are recovered from the sea in Brighton, in what police describe as a "tragic incident". The beach at Madeira Drive is closed to the public while inquiries begin to identify the victims and establish the circumstances of their deaths.
  - Nathaniel Menday, a newly elected Reform UK councillor on Sheffield City Council is suspended from the party after the emergence of deleted social media posts in which he described the UK as having a "subhuman underclass".
  - Reform UK suspends Sunderland councillor Glenn Gibbins for a social media post in which he suggested the city's Nigerian population should be melted down to "fill in potholes".
- 14 May –
  - Abdul Halim Khan, a former imam, is sentenced to life imprisonment with a minimum term of 20 years for a series of sexual assaults on women and girls. Khan had pleaded guilty to the offences at an earlier hearing.
  - The UK Health Security Agency confirms that one person has died and two are ill following cases of meningitis in Reading.
- 15 May – Following a trial at Newcastle Crown Court, Billy Stokoe, who killed an 86-year-old woman on a zebra crossing after hitting her while riding an electric motorbile, is sentenced to seven years in custody for causing death by dangerous driving.
- 18 May – At a hearing at Preston Crown Court, Bhekisani Matabiswana is sentenced to life imprisonment with a minimum term of 16 years and 6 months for the murder of Luke Harden, a former model, who was attacked in Bacup, Derbyshire, in November 2025.
- 19 May – Southampton F.C. are thrown out of the Championship play-offs after admitting they spied on other clubs by filming training sessions during the football season.
- 20 May –
  - Three women who were recovered from the sea at Brighton on 13 May are identified as three sisters.
  - George Finch, leader of Warwickshire County Council, is elected leader of Nuneaton and Bedworth Borough Council.
  - Derby City Council holds its annual Mayor Making Ceremony, with the outgoing mayor choosing an instrumental version of the 1999 Dr. Dre track "Still D.R.E." as one of the pieces of music played at the event. This leads to criticism from other councillors over the choice of music.
  - A meeting of Kirklees Council ends without electing a leader after Sarah Wood, leader of the council's Reform group, says her members do not understand the rules. After a video of the meeting goes viral, attracting some derision, Wood says that her members have received the appropriate training.
- 23 May –
  - A man dies after falling from a city centre building in Greater Manchester.
  - Nottinghamshire Police launch an investigation after suspected skeletal human remains are found in woodland beside the A617 in Nottinghamshire.
- 25 May – A 30-year-old woman, subsequently named as Shanice Brookes, is fatally injured following a shooting outside a nightclub in Sheffield.
- 26 May – Janice Nix is convicted of the manslaughter of her stepdaughter, Andrea Bernard, who died in hospital in July 1978, five weeks after she forced the girl to take a scalding hot bath as a punishment.
- 27 May –
  - Resident doctors announce a four-day strike from 7am on 15 June, their 16th strike action over a pay dispute.
  - At a hearing at Bristol Crown Court, Kelcie Reed pleads guilty to being in charge of a dog dangerously out control, causing the death of her cousin, Morgan Dorsett, during an incident at her home in February 2025.
  - A Freedom of Information request reveals that 13 fines issued by Oxford City Council for breaches of its congestion charge were cancelled due to the drivers being deceased.
  - At a hearing at Wolverhampton Crown Court, Tanveer Singh is sentenced to life imprisonment with a minimum term of 29 years for the murder of Shara Millar, a sex worker who he attacked in the back of his van after seeking services from her during a night out in August 2025.
- 28 May –
  - A man is killed after he is hit by a train after escaping from a custody van on its way from a police station to court in Hertfordshire.
  - It is revealed that Birmingham City Council has spent £470,000 on fines for its own vehicles because they breach the city's Clean Air Zone policy.
  - Following a trial at Southampton Crown Court, Vickrum Digwa is convicted of the murder of Henry Nowak, a student who he stabbed to death with a ceremonial blade as he returned home from a night out in Southampton on 3 December 2025.
  - At a hearing at Leeds Crown Court, Michael Doherty, a convicted rapist, is sentenced to life imprisonment with a minimum term of 33 years for the murder of Courtney Angus after she rejected his advances. Doherty had pleaded guilty to murdering Courtney, who had moved into his house as a lodger three weeks before her death, at a previous hearing.
- 29 May –
  - Two people are charged in connection with the shooting of Shanice Brookes outside a Sheffield nightclub.
  - The Crown Prosecution Service announces that two men accused of assaulting a police officer at Manchester Airport during a brawl captured on video in 2024, and shared on social media, will not face a second retrial.
  - Samuel Field is sentenced to life imprisonment with a minimum term of 22 years for the murder of Martyn Glynn, a 93-year-old man who was tortured by Field at his home in Desborough, Northamptonshire for more than 24 hours in September 2024.
  - Usmon Mahmood and Uways Hussain, who killed Sylvester Abayomi during a collision while driving at 130mph and high on laughing gas in March 2026, are sentenced to twelve years and nine months and eleven years and eight months respectively at a hearing at Manchester Crown Court.
  - The Cross-City Line between Birmingham New Street and Lichfield Trent Valley closes for three days in order for a viaduct to be moved into place for HS2.
- 30 May –
  - Train services to and from Heathrow Airport are disrupted following a burst water main.
  - Merseyside Police confirm that a 15-year-old girl who was taken to hospital after getting into difficulty in water at Formby Beach on 25 May has died.
  - Nottinghamshire Police confirm a 19-year-old man rescued from Balderton Lake near Newark on 28 May has died.
- 31 May – Around 40,000 people take part in the 2026 Great Manchester Run.

=== June ===
- 1 June – Vickrum Digwa is sentenced to life imprisonment with a minimum term of 21 years for the murder of Henry Nowak.
- 3 June – Nine children are treated in hospital after eating seeds from trees at a primary school in West Bridgford, Nottinghamshire.
- 4 June –
  - A 21-year-old man is arrested after a member of staff at the University of Surrey was shot with a crossbow. The man is charged with attempted murder.
  - Members of ASLEF stage a second one-day strike on the London Underground, with Transport for London reporting that tube journeys were at 86% of their normal level.
- 5 June – Grammy Award-winning singer-songwriter Talay Riley, 35, is stabbed to death in Silvertown, east London.
- 8 June – Fire breaks out at a recycling centre in Bermondsey, south London, disrupting local train services.
- 9 June –
  - Clifton George is sentenced to life imprisonment with a minimum term of 23 years for the murder of his partner, Annabel Rook, who he strangled and stabbed multiple times, before blowing up their house in a gas explosion.
  - The first two men are sentenced to custodial terms for violent disorder at a Southampton protest over the murder of Henry Nowak. A further 11 men are given prison sentences over the next few days.
- 10 June – The University of Nottingham confirms that a data breach of student details by a well-known criminal cyber-hacking gang.
- 11 June –
  - Northumbria Police confirm the death of one of their officers, 19-year-old Jess Turnbull, who was injured in a collision after responding to a crash on 8 June.
  - An NHS safety inquiry concludes that dozens of children questioning their gender, including some under 13 years old, were inappropriately prescribed medication by a Brighton GP practice.
- 12 June –
  - Four members of Palestine Action are given custodial sentences for breaking into the premises of Elbit Systems, a, Israeli defence company, in August 2024.
  - A 17-year-old girl is stabbed in a street in Brierfield, Lancashire; a man is subsequently charged with attempted murder.
- 18 June – Police confirm that the body of a man was found in the landing gear of a plane that landed at Gatwick Airport from Morocco on 16 June.
- 19 June – Janice Nix is sentenced to twelve years in prison for the 1978 manslaughter of Andrea Bernard.
- 20 June – A murder investigation is launched following the fatal stabbing of a 17-year-old boy in Battersea, south London, in the early hours.
- 21 June –
  - A murder investigation is launched following the fatal stabbing of a man, subsequently named as Kamahl Cameron-Williams, in Crystal Palace, south-east London."Man stabbed to death in Crystal Palace is named by police". BBC News. BBC. 23 June 2026.
  - The Two Lads, two stone cairns on Winter Hill near Greater Manchester, are to be taken down and rebuilt to make them safer.
- 22 June – The throne used by Ozzy Osbourne for his final concert is to go on display in Birmingham as the first anniversary of his death approaches.
- 23 June – Labour names Bev Craig, the leader of Manchester City Council, as its candidate for the 2026 Greater Manchester mayoral by-election.
- 24 June –
  - Derbyshire Police have launched a murder investigation following the discovery of the body of a man, named as Isaac Clare-Watts, at the Nine Ladies Stone Circle in Stanton Lees on 22 June.
  - An NHS trust pays out £187,000 in damages after an employment tribunal found it harassed seven nurses by requiring them to share a changing room with a transgender woman.
  - A code of conduct hearing clears George Finch, the leader of Warwickshire County Council, of any wrongdoing over comments he made on social media about a rape case involving an asylum seeker.
- 25 June –
  - A woman is killed and an eight-year-old girl is critical in hospital after their car was struck by a train at a level crossing in Hoghton, near Preston, Lancashire.
  - 2026 United Kingdom heatwaves: West Midlands Railway suspends services between Coventry and Leamington Spa after a track at Leamington buckled during the heat.
- 26 June –
  - 2026 United Kingdom heatwaves:
    - London residents are urged to be cautious after thermal imaging equipment recorded a temperature of 57°C on some pavements and playgrounds.
    - South East Coast Ambulance Service declares a critical incident after recording one of its busiest days of the year.
  - West Midlands Police issue an urgent appeal after the body of a newborn baby was found the previous day at a warehouse in Rowley Regis.
  - Mohammed Fahir Amaaz, who punched two female police officers at Manchester Airport when they tried to arrest him for headbutting a man in a Starbucks coffee shop, is sentenced to three and a half years in prison.
- 27 June –
  - The crocodile enclosure of Johnsons of Old Hurst in Cambridgeshire is reopened nine days after a three-year-old child was injured after being attacked by at least one of the reptiles.
  - A man is arrested on suspicion of attempted murder after five people were injured when a car ploughed into pedestrians in Ealing Broadway, west London.
  - England go through to the knock-out stages of the World Cup after defeating Panama 2–0.
- 28 June –
  - Phil Eckersley is chosen as the Conservative candidate for the 2026 Greater Manchester mayoral by-election.
  - England cricketer Ben Stokes announces his retirement from professional cricket.
- 29 June –
  - Student Jagger Strang, who admitted possessing explosives and threatening to bomb his college, is sentenced to three years and eleven months in prison.
  - Sian Astley is announced as the Reform UK candidate for the 2026 Greater Manchester mayoral by-election.
- 30 June –
  - A further two men are sentenced to prison terms for violence committed during a demonstration that occurred in Southampton on 2 June.
  - The Parole Board grants Maria Pearson, Britain's longest-serving female prisoner, parole after concluding she no longer poses a threat to the public. Pearson has been in prison since stabbing her ex-boyfriend's new partner in 1986.
  - A Progress Pride flag is removed from the headquarters of Huntingdonshire District Council after a Reform UK objection revealed it should have been granted planning permission.

=== July ===
- 1 July –
  - 2026 FIFA World Cup: England defeat DR Congo 2–1 in the round of 32, coming from behind through two late Harry Kane goals to reach the round of 16.
  - The UK government announces that teachers in England will receive a 3.5% pay rise from September 2026, and a 3% pay rise from September 2027.
  - Buildings at 62-70 Victoria Street in Paignton begin to be demolished.
  - A wildfire breaks out at Captain Cook's Monument on Easby Moor.
  - Claire Ward, the mayor of the East Midlands, criticises UK government proposals to scrap two major road projects in the region as part of cuts planned to help pay for increases in defence spending.
- 4 July – Police find the bodies of two men reported missing a week earlier in a car that had crashed on the A584 Preston New Road in Newton-with-Clifton, Lancashire.
- 6 July –
  - 2026 FIFA World Cup: England defeat co-hosts Mexico 3–2 at the Mexico City Stadium in the round of 16, with Jude Bellingham scoring twice and Harry Kane converting a penalty, to reach the quarter-finals despite playing much of the second half with only ten men following Jarell Quansah's red card.
  - A wildfire breaks out at Bourne Valley Park in Dorset.
- 9 July – A man is charged with the murder of Patricia Lashley, who was last seen at her home in Dudley, West Midlands in September 1998.
- 10 July – Police in South Africa confirm the arrest of a man wanted for the murder of his wife and two daughters in Great Denham, Bedfordshire.
- 12 July –
  - 2026 FIFA World Cup: England defeat Norway 2–1 after extra time in the quarter-finals, with Jude Bellingham scoring both goals, to reach the semi-finals for the fourth time.
  - 24-year-old Kirandeep Kaur is stabbed to death as she slept with her husband and baby at their home in Hayes, west London.
  - Two men have died after going into the sea to help two children who were in trouble at Hartlepool, Cleveland.
- 15 July –
  - 2026 FIFA World Cup: England lose 2–1 to defending champions Argentina in the semi-finals. England lead through Anthony Gordon before late goals from Enzo Fernández and Lautaro Martínez send Argentina through to the final against Spain.
  - Three men who raped a woman on Brighton beach in October 2025 are sentenced to between 18 and 21 years in prison.
- 16 July – The UK government announces that children under the age of 16 will be banned from purchasing high-caffeine energy drinks from April 2027.
- 18 July –
  - Firefighters are tackling a moorland fire in Greater Manchester and Derbyshire, with the owner of the land estimating the size of the destruction to be equivalent to 1,250 football pitches.
  - At a hearing at Southwark Crown Court, Narinder Sandhu, who was sentenced to prison in 2024 for a £70m postal scam run over nine years, is ordered to repay more than £5m to Royal Mail or face further time in custody.
  - A fire heavily damages Paignton railway station and train services are cancelled.
- 21 July –
  - The RMT announces that its members working for East Midlands Railway will take strike action over urgent safety concerns.
  - Tonnes of food at the FareShare North East base in Teesside is destroyed following a break-in.
- 22 July –
  - A man is stabbed to death in Leicester.
  - The ex-chief executive of Southern Water and three others are charged with conspiracy to defraud.
- 23 July
  - A woman and teenage girl die at at Sea View Holiday Park, West Mersea.
  - A man is sentenced for the manslaughter of Thomas Taylor, who was stabbed to death outside Bedford bus station on 8 January 2025.
  - A woman is charged with murdering a 77-year-old man at a supported living retirement home in Stockton-on-Tees.
  - An e-scooter rider is injured in a serious crash in Leicester.
  - A man who planned a terrorist attack is sentenced to life with a minimum term of 17 years.
  - Homes in the Grenoside suburb of Sheffield are evacuated following a fire.
  - The hedgehog found in Yeadon, West Yorkshire that was painted blue and yellow dies despite a rescue effort.
- 24 July –
  - Five men are killed when a car hits a lamppost in Huyton, Liverpool.
  - Five police officers are injured after a police boat belonging to the Metropolitan Police collides with Westminster Bridge in central London.
  - A murder investigation is launched following the fatal stabbing of a 17-year-old boy in Luton, Bedfordshire.
- 25 July –
  - Police launch a murder investigation following the fatal stabbing of a 22-year-old man in Clapham, south London.
  - Four people, including a baby, are killed after a car crashes into trees on a dual-carriageway in Derby.
- 27 July – Actress Tricia Penrose, who played barmaid Gina Ward in Heartbeat, announces she has become co-owner of the Goathland Hotel, the North Yorkshire pub that was used for filming scenes set in the fictional Aidensfield Arms.
- 28 July –
  - Several human skeletons, believed to date from the mediaeval period, are discovered at a construction site in Peterborough.
  - A fire destroys the roof of St Andrew's Church, Leicester.
- 29 July –
  - Serial killer James Desborough is given two whole life prison sentences for the murder of 57-year-old Claudio Aquilino and 43-year-old Daniel Coleman in Cornwall in the spring of 2025.
  - A third person dies after the incident at West Mersea.
  - The Environment Agency declares over half of England at risk of drought.
  - A £20,000 reward for information is made on the 45th anniversary of the disappearance of Vishal Mehrotra.
  - A woman is killed in a car accident on the A170 road in North Yorkshire.
  - A Norwegian teenager is found guilty of conspiracy to murder.
  - Chris Noble resigns as the chief constable of Staffordshire Police ahead of a gross misconduct hearing over his behaviour.
  - 2026 Dunwich Heath wildfire
- 30 July –
  - The 2026 Greater Manchester mayoral by-election is held. Bev Craig is elected, retaining the seat for Labour.
  - A beach hut fire breaks out at Sandbanks.
  - A man drowns at sea in Essex.
  - Serial child sex offender Paul Hopkins is sentenced to 22 years in prison.
  - Alexandra Walker and her boyfriend, Harrison Simpson, are sentenced to life imprisonment for the "sadistic" abuse and murder of Walker's two-year-old daughter, Isabella Welsh.
  - Fifteen people are taken to hospital following a "suspected chlorine leak" at a leisure centre in Derby.
- 31 July –
  - Former funeral director Robert Bush is sentenced at Hull Crown Court to 20 years' imprisonment after admitting 67 offences committed over 12 years, including preventing the lawful and decent burial of 30 bodies, giving bereaved families incorrect ashes, fraud and theft from charities. The case involved one of the biggest and most complex investigations in the history of Humberside Police.
  - At a hearing at Winchester Crown Court, Paris Wilson is sentenced to nine years in prison for the manslaughter of her ex-husband, drug dealer Danny Cahalane, after she participated in an acid attack on him in Plymouth in February 2025. Calahane died in hospital several weeks later.
  - A figure of a female streaker interrupting a football match is removed from a display at Godshill Model Village on the Isle of Wight following complaints.

=== August ===
- 1 August –
  - Brighton and Hove Pride launches its LGBTQ+ celebration for the 35th year. Armed police are to be deployed to protect the event, following the recent Berlin Pride attack.
  - 2026 Dunwich Heath wildfire: The blaze is described by firefighters as "stable", while the National Trust launches a fundraiser to help the habitats "recover and thrive in a changing climate".
  - A manhunt is launched for prisoner Stephen Grzyb after he escaped from custody while being transported to court in Liverpool.
- 2 August – Trains between London and Stansted Airport are halted by multiple trackside fires.
- 3 August –
  - The body of a teenage kayaker is found off the coast of Blyth.
  - A man is detained at hospital for responsibility for reported vampiric carcass incidents in the New Forest.
  - Author Lynda La Plante is disqualified from driving for six months.
- 5 August – A 47-year-old woman is arrested after four men are stabbed in Covent Garden, central London. All victims are treated at the scene by an air ambulance team and then taken to a major trauma centre.
- 6 August – At a hearing at Sheffield Crown Court, farmer Christopher Wright is sentenced to life imprisonment with a minimum term of 35 years for the November 2019 murder of his lodger, Richard Dyson, whose body was dismembered and remained undiscovered for six years.
- 7 August –
  - Jahvine Kwamba, a former prison officer at HMP Fosse Way, who embarked on a relationship with a prisoner who styled himself the "Latvian Pablo Escobar", is sentenced to eight months in prison.
  - At the Old Bailey, Ashley Wallace is found guilty of the murder of Tyrece Balcha, who was shot outside a nightclub in Wembley in September 2026.
  - Flights to and from Bristol Airport are suspended after a defect is discovered on the runway.
- 8 August – A problem with the luggage handling system at Birmingham Airport results in a significant number of passengers flying out without their luggage.
- 10 August –
  - The Independent Office for Police Conduct says it is investigating a senior detective from Derbyshire Police for what it describes as "AI-related gross misconduct".
  - Chessington World of Adventures is forced to close for the day after a water outage in the area.
  - A murder investigation is launched following the fatal shooting of a 25-year-old man in Clapham, south west London. A suspect is arrested the following day.
- 11 August –
  - NHS data indicates England is on course to become one of the first countries to eradicate Hepatitis C.
  - The risk of an explosion at a large warehouse fire in St Albans forces the temporary closure of both carriageways of the M25 between junctions 22 and 21A.
- 12 August – The funeral takes place of murdered Reform UK politician, Ann Widdecombe, at Buckfast Abbey in Devon.
- 13 August –
  - There is widespread destruction of property in wildfires particularly in the West Midlands.
  - A new £40m urgent and emergency care unit opens at Arrowe Park Hospital in Merseyside.
  - Three World War Two veterans aged 99, 100 and 101 fly in Spitfires for the first time from London Biggin Hill Airport.
  - The Saltash Tunnel in Cornwall is blocked after car and motorhome crash.
  - A pedestrian is killed in a single vehicle collision on the A380 road near Kingskerswell in Devon.
  - Two men who burgled the home of a dead man in Lincoln are sentenced to a total of five years in prison.
- 14 August –
  - Penny farthing cyclist Richard Thoday beats the continuous ride record (which had stood since 1886), at Reading Velodrome.
  - Two prisoners are charged with attempting to murder Urfan Sharif, serving life for the murder of his daughter, Sara Sharif in 2023. The charges relate to an incident at HMP Belmarsh on 1 January.
- 15 August – A murder inquiry is launched after a man dies from injuries sustained when he was bitten by a dog on a footpath in West Yorkshire.
- 17 August – Royal Parks confirms that a stag was euthanised after attacking a man in Richmond Park two days earlier while he was having a picnic with his family.
- 18 August –
  - The first hosepipe ban from Wessex Water since 1976 comes into force.
  - The UK government announces that disabled bus pass holders in England will be able to travel freely all day, rather than being restricted to off-peak times, from April 2027.
  - Burnham announces that every rough sleeper in England will be offered accommodation during the forthcoming winter.
  - A massive fire breaks out at a waste facility in Bermondsey.
  - Moorland School in Clitheroe is put up for sale.
  - The body of a man is found in the River Tyne.
  - The body of a man is found at The Valley Stadium in London.
  - Three members of the same family are confirmed dead in an incident at Shoreham-by-Sea.
- 20 August – Members of Oldham Borough Council, which was left with no party in overall control following the May elections, fail to vote on forming an administration, triggering the possibility that central government officials will take over the running of the authority.
- 21 August – A six-year-old girl, whose family died after getting into difficulty at Shoreham-on-Sea, dies in hospital.
- 22 August –
  - Seven people including two police officers are killed in a car crash on the A66 in South Bank, near Middlesbrough.
  - A blue plaque is unveiled at the former Surrey home of Paddington Bear author Michael Bond.
- 24 August –
  - A man is killed and two people are injured following a crash involving two cars during a police chase at Stratford-upon-Avon in Warwickshire.
  - The UK government announces the building of 70,000 social housing units in England over ten years.
- 25 August – A murder investigation is launched following the fatal stabbing of a man at Brent Civic Centre in west London. A 15-year-old boy is subsequently arrested on suspicion of murder.
- 26 August –
  - A murder investigation is launched following a house fire in which two people, including a child, were killed in Middlesbrough, Cleveland. Two men are arrested on suspicion of murder.
  - An investigation by West Midlands Fire Service into two wildfires that destroyed 19 properties in Stourbridge, West Midlands, concludes they were started accidentally in fields where farm machinery was in operation.
- 27 August –
  - Flights at Luton Airport are disrupted following a lightning strike on the airport's traffic control system.
  - Public disorder breaks out at an event held in a field at Haswell, County Durhsm, to release balloons in memory of one of the men killed in the A66 crash.
- 28 August – A 41-year-old man is killed and six other people are injured after a large sign falls over at the Big Church Festival near Steyning in West Sussex. The deceased man is subsequently named as Pastor Robert Guanco.
- 29 August – A man is killed after a van is hit by a train on a level crossing at Burscough, West Lancashire.
- 31 August – Merseyside Police appeal for information following the discovery of a woman's body in a bin bag in a park on 28 August. The woman, who is believed to be in her 70s, is unidentified.

=== September ===
- 1 September – A man is remanded in custody charged with the murder of a seven-year-old girl and her aunt in a house fire in Middlesbrough.
- 2 September – Four people are remanded in custody charged with the murder of a baby, who was repeatedly stabbed at a property in Sheffield, South Yorkshire.
- 3 September – The first robotaxis with a driver supervising are launched by Uber in London.
- 4 September –
  - Flights at Gatwick Airport are brought to a halt for an hour after a plane becomes stuck on the runway.
  - At a hearing at Bristol Crown Court, Kelcie Reed, whose XL bully killed her cousin, Morgan Dorsett, in February, is sentenced to 18 weeks in prison, suspended for 18 months.
- 5 September –
  - Trains to and from Heathrow Airport are cancelled following a trackside fire.
  - The UK government announces plans to create the National Roads Policing Coordination Centre, a new central organisation to target illegal number plates.
- 6 September – Two cyclists are killed following a collision with a car in Cobham, Kent; three people are arrested in connection with the incident.
- 7 September –
  - It is formally announced that the Universities of Kent and Greenwich have merged to create the London and South East University Group, a "super-university" with 50,000 students.
  - Nigel Swales, who was elected to Lancashire County Council in 2025, becomes the first councillor to defect from Reform UK to Labour.
- 11 September – At a hearing at Wolverhampton Crown Court, Trevor Dunkley pleads guilty to the murder of Patricia Lashley, who was last seen at her home in Dudley, West Midlands, in September 1998.
- 15 September – Nicholas Brandram, a suspect in the Putney Pusher case, is found dead at his home by police.
- 16 September –
  - Police searching for Noah Woods, a partially deaf and non-verbal three-year-old boy, recover the body of a child from Decoy Pond in Brantham, Suffolk, after he disappeared from a nearby playground the previous day. More than 1,300 volunteers had joined emergency services in the search. Formal identification is yet to take place, but Woods' family are informed of the discovery.
  - The UK government announces an extra £500m of investment in schools in England to increase teachers' pay and avoid a strike ballot.
- 17 September –
  - The National Institute for Health and Care Excellence reverses its 2024 decision and recommends trastuzumab deruxtecan (Enhertu) for routine NHS use in England for patients with HER2-low advanced breast cancer, making around 1,000 patients a year eligible for the treatment.
  - A 56-year-old man is arrested after human remains found in woodland in south-west London are identified as mother-of-three Joanne Sheen, missing since December 2019.
- 19 September – About 280 people are evacuated from the Grand Burstin Hotel in Folkestone, Kent, following a fire in the early hours of the morning.
- 20 September – Two men are arrested on suspicion of plotting a terrorist attack against Manchester's Jewish community.
- 21 September – Former Ashfield District Council leader Jason Zadrozny is found guilty of fraud and tax evasion after setting up a fake heritage group to defraud money from Nottinghamshire County Council.
- 22 September –
  - A woman and her three children die in a house fire in Bootle, Merseyside.
  - NHS England announces that Martha's Rule, which enables parents to seek a second opinion on a child's diagnosis in A&E, will be extended to cover emergency departments throughout England.
  - Plans are announced to expand coverage of Dolly Parton's Imagination Library, which posts a child a free book every month until their fifth birthday, from three London boroughs to ten.
- 24 September –
  - A 16-year-old girl is killed in a crash near Highgate School in north London.
  - One person is taken to hospital following a fire at an accommodation block at Catterick Barracks.
- 25 September – At a hearing at Stafford Crown Court, Kenneth Newton and Melanie James are sentenced to life imprisonment with a minimum term of 21 years for the murder of Newton's stepbrother, Rubin Blount, who the couple abused at his home in Tamworth, Staffordshire.
- 26 September – World, a crocodile zoo in Brize Norton, reports the death of Albert, an alligator who arrived at the zoo in 2013, and who appeared on television and took part in research.
- 29 September – Three teenagers are killed after a car entered the River Wear in Sunderland; a fourth teenager is taken to hospital, and subsequently arrested in connection with the incident.

=== October ===
- 2 October – Kevin Rees, who blew up an Ultra Low Emission Zone camera in southeast London, is sentenced to 15 years in prison.
- 3 October – It is revealed that Southern Trains cancelled a number of mainline services in Kent after bedbugs were discovered in the driver's cabins of two locomotives on 22 September.
- 6 October – On the second day of his trial at Wolverhampton Crown Court, Benjamin Day, a forensic science undergraduate from the University of Worcester, pleads guilty to the murder of Maria Saceanu, a Romanian sex worker who he stabbed to death after luring her to a "kill room" he established at an Airbnb in Tividale, West Midlands, in December 2025. Day, who was obsessed with the TV series Dexter, attempted to dismember his victim's remains, but abandoned this plan after cutting his hand with a knife. He will be sentenced on 4 December.
- 9 October – At a hearing at Leeds Crown Court, David Barraclough is sentenced to life imprisonment with a minimum term of 22 years for the murder of his wife, Carolann, who he killed by striking her with a hammer in February 2026, then storing her body in a freezer to conceal the crime. Barraclough had pleaded guilty to murder at a previous hearing.
- 11 October –
  - A man is arrested in connection with the fatal shootings of Junior Ajose and Cheriff Tall at a lockdown party in Manchester's Moss Side area on 21 June 2020.
  - Police launch a murder investigation following the fatal stabbing of a man at a pub in Sutton Coldfield, West Midlands.
- 14 October – Cambridgeshire Police confirm that a 14-year-old boy has been injured after falling from the window of a double-decker bus.
- 15 October – NHS England publishes guidelines that transgender people should use hospital spaces according to their biological sex.
- 16 October – At a hearing at Sheffield Crown Court, Philip Foster, who played the character Christian Wright in Brookside, is sentenced to nine years in prison for orchestrating a £13.6m fraud involving a string of fake model agencies that conned several hundred would-be models out of their money.
- 18 October – Two teenagers are killed in a crash between two vehicles at Little Stonham, Suffolk.
- 19 October – Luke Campbell, Reform UK's elected mayor of Hull and East Yorkshire, is under police investigation for allegedly sharing naked images of himself online.
- 23 October – At a hearing at Bristol Crown Court, Yasmeen Ali is sentenced to an indefinite hospital order for killing her three children. She had amitted the offence at a previous hearing, and will be detained at a psychiatric hospital.
- 24 October – A four-year-old girl is fatally injured after falling from a tower block in Barking, east London.
- 26 October –
  - Hardeep Bhachu is sentenced to 12 years in prison, while Jasskamal Riyat receives 16 years for killing a mother and her four-year-old daughter while racing their high-performance cars through Leeds city centre.
  - Two teachers are struck off after encouraging two pupils to fight at a school in Dursley, Gloucestershire, in 2019.
- 30 October – Simon Richardson is found guilty of murdering head teacher Michael Mullins by dragging him for more than a mile while trapped under the wheels of a car. The judge tells Richardson he can expect life imprisonment when sentenced on Monday at Manchester's Minshull Street Crown Court.
- 31 October –
  - Five teenagers are seriously injured after being stabbed at a Halloween party in Chandler's Ford, Hampshire.
  - Bradford Council have given the go-ahead for a school of performing arts in the city, nicknamed Brit School North.

=== November ===
- 1 November – West Midlands Police make seven arrests following public disorder involving fireworks in Birmingham City Centre.
- 3 November – George Madgwick, the leader of Reform UK in Hampshire, is charged with 35 offences against four victims over a 13-year period, including rape, sexual assault, controlling or coercive behaviour, and making indecent images of a child.
- 7 November –
  - Two men and a boy are arrested after a boy was injured during a sword attack in Gloucester the previous day.
  - Buildings in Liverpool City Centre are evacuated after a gas leak is caused by a car crashing into a restaurant.
- 9 November – Sunderland city councillor Glenn Gibbins, a former member of Reform UK who was suspended from the party, is sentenced to a 12-month community order with 150 hours of unpaid work for a "grossly offensive" Facebook post about Nigerians made in March 2024.
- 12 November –
  - At Leeds Crown Court, teenager Kayla Smith pleads guilty to the murder of 16-year-old Chloe Watson Dransfield, who was stabbed at Smith's house during a row over a boyfriend in March 2026.
  - Appearing at Portsmouth Crown Court via videolink from prison, anti-immigration activist Daniel Thomas pleads guilty to slashing a dinghy with a knife in the English Channel.
- 19 November – Bradford City Councillor Ibrar Ali is seriously injured in a stabbing incident. A man is subsequently arrested and charged with attempted murder.
- 21 November –
  - A man in his 40s is killed in a collision between a van and a lorry on the M42 motorway near Birmingham Airport.
  - 2026 Nations Championship: England defeat New Zealand 37–12 at Twickenham.

=== Predicted and scheduled events ===
- June to July – 2026 Women's T20 World Cup
- 10 to 16 August – 2026 European Athletics Championships

== Holidays ==
- 1 January – New Year's Day
- 3 April – Good Friday
- 6 April – Easter Monday
- 4 May – Early May bank holiday
- 25 May – Spring May Bank Holiday
- 31 August – Summer Bank Holiday
- 25 December – Christmas Day
- 26 December – Boxing Day

== Deaths ==
=== January ===
- 1 January – Gregory de Polnay, 82, English actor (Dixon of Dock Green, Doctor Who, Howards' Way).
- 2 January –
  - Francis Grant, 101, marine and World War II veteran.
  - Jenny Collins, 83, broadcaster and producer (BBC Radio Merseyside). (death announced on this date)
- 3 January – Terry Wharton, 83, English footballer (Wolverhampton Wanderers, Bolton Wanderers, Crystal Palace).
- 4 January – Alan Baker, 81, English footballer (Aston Villa). (death announced on this date)
- 5 January –
  - Andrew Bodnar, 71, English bass guitarist (The Rumour) and songwriter ("I Love the Sound of Breaking Glass"). (death announced on this date)
  - Colin McDonald, 95, English footballer (Burnley, Headington United, national team). (death announced on this date)
  - Mike Wilson, 66, British kart racer, six-time Karting World Champion.
- 7 January –
  - Martin Chivers, 80, English footballer (Southampton, Tottenham Hotspur, national team).
  - Tony Field, 79, English footballer (Blackburn Rovers, Southport, Memphis Rogues).
- 8 January – Howard Riley, 87, English footballer (Leicester City, Walsall, Barrow).
- 10 January – Derek Martin, 92, English actor (EastEnders).
- 11 January – Robert Hopkins, 64, English footballer (Birmingham City, West Bromwich Albion, Shrewsbury Town).
- 12 January – Sheila Bernette, 94, English singer (The Good Old Days, The Black and White Minstrel Show) and actress (The Magnificent Seven Deadly Sins).
- 13 January – David Collier, 70, English sports administrator, chief executive of the England and Wales Cricket Board (2004–2014).
- 15 January – Kenny Morris, 68, English drummer (Siouxsie and the Banshees). (death announced on this date)
- 18 January – David Young, 80, English footballer (Charlton Athletic, Southend United, Newcastle United).
- 20 January – Tommy Wright, 81, English footballer (Everton, national team). (death announced on this date)
- 21 January –
  - Ian Macowat, 60, English footballer (Crewe Alexandra, Northwich Victoria, Gillingham). (death announced on this date)
  - Peter Squires, 74, English cricketer (Yorkshire) and rugby union player (British & Irish Lions).
- 29 January – Peter Lee, 80, English cricketer (Northamptonshire, Lancashire). (death announced on this date)

=== February ===
- 1 February – Tony Pigott, 67, English cricketer (Sussex, Surrey, national team), heart attack.
- 10 February –
  - Des de Moor, 64, English writer and musician. (death announced on this date)
  - Andrew Ranken, 72, English drummer (The Pogues).
- 13 February – Brian Westlake, 82, English footballer (Halifax Town, Colchester United, Tranmere Rovers). (death announced on this date)
- 14 February – Gordon Brown, 95, English rugby league footballer (Leeds, Great Britain).
- 15 February – Michael Page, 84, English cricketer (Derbyshire). (death announced on this date)
- 16 February – Harry Barnes, 89, English politician, MP (1987–2005), cancer.
- 18 February – Roy Ellam, 83, English footballer (Bradford City, Huddersfield Town, Leeds United). (death announced on this date)
- 21 February – John Bertalot, 94, English organist.
- 22 February – Jim Parsons, 82, English rugby union player (Oxford, Northampton, national team).
- 25 February – Rob Grant, 70, English comedy writer and television producer (Red Dwarf).
- 26 February – Drusilla Beyfus, 98, English writer and journalist (Reading Mercury).
- 28 February – Bernard Lewis, 100, English clothing chain executive, founder and president of River Island.

=== March ===
- 2 March –
  - Kevin Ashcroft, 81, English rugby player (Leigh, Warrington) and coach (Salford).
  - Len Garry, 84, English musician (The Quarrymen), pneumonia.
  - Mike Vernon, 81, English record producer ("Albatross", "Hocus Pocus"), music executive and recording studio owner (Chipping Norton Recording Studios).
- 4 March – Chris Wheeler, 52, English chef.
- 5 March –
  - Bobby Cummines, 74, English gangster.
  - David Wilde, 75, English cricketer (Derbyshire). (death announced on this date)
- 7 March – Matt Salter, 49, English rugby union (Bristol) and rugby league (London Broncos) player.
- 8 March – Matt Gallagher, English rugby union player (Coventry R.F.C.), motor neurone disease.
- 13 March – Amy Carr, 34, English footballer (Reading, Northern Illinois Huskies, IL Sandviken), brain tumour.
- 16 March – Tony Gould, 87, journalist (New Society, New Statesman). (death announced on this date)
- 20 March – Robert Fox, 73, English film and television producer (The Hours, The Crown, Iris). (death announced on this date)
- 21 March – Jeff Smith, 91, English Hall of Fame motorcycle racer (Motocross World Championship).
- 25 March –
  - Harold Ellis, 100, English surgeon.
  - Mick Roberts, 57, English singer (The Bridewell Taxis).
- 27 March –
  - Alex Cropley, 75, English-Scottish footballer (Hibernian, Aston Villa, Scotland national team). (death announced on this date)
  - Geoff Vowden, 84, English footballer (Birmingham City, Aston Villa, Nottingham Forest). (death announced on this date)
- 29 March – Glen Baxter, 82, English artist, carcinomatosis.
- 30 March – Tony Godden, 70, English footballer (Chelsea, Peterborough United, West Bromwich Albion). (death announced on this date)
- 31 March – Tony Rivers, 85, English singer (Harmony Grass).

=== April ===
- 5 April – David Wiffen, 84, English–Canadian folk singer-songwriter (Driving Wheel).
- 6 April – Angela Pleasence, 84, English actress (Hitler: The Last Ten Days, Coronation Street, Doctor Who).
- 8 April – Brian Garvey, 88, English footballer (Hull City, Watford, Colchester United). (death announced on this date)
- 11 April – Mike Westbrook, 90, English jazz pianist and composer.
- 13 April – Nicky Smith, 57, English football player (Colchester United, Braintree Town) and manager (AFC Sudbury). (death announced on this date)
- 15 April – Henry Newton, 82, English footballer (Nottingham Forest, Derby County). (death announced on this date)
- 16 April – Andy Kershaw, 66, English broadcaster and radio DJ (BBC Radio 1), cancer.
- 18 April – Gordon Livsey, 79, English footballer (Wrexham, Chester, Hartlepool United). (death announced on this date)
- 19 April – Desmond Morris, 98, English zoologist (The Naked Ape), ethnologist and surrealist painter.
- 21 April – Elsie Kelly, 89, English actress (Benidorm, The Famous Five, Crossroads).
- 22 April –
  - Peter J. Carroll, 72–73, British occultist and writer.
  - Kathy Dooley, 70, British singer (The Dooleys), dementia.
  - Tony Parkes, 76, English football player (Buxton, Blackburn Rovers) and manager (Blackburn Rovers), complications from Alzheimer's disease.
- 23 April –
  - George Ley, 80, English footballer (Portsmouth, Dallas Tornado, Exeter City). (death announced on this date)
  - Josh Mauro, 35, English-born American football player (Arizona Cardinals, New York Giants, Jacksonville Jaguars).
- 24 April – Bill Ind, 84, English Anglican bishop, bishop of Truro (1997–2008). (death announced on this date)

=== May ===
- 6 May – Jesse Hector, 78, English musician (The Gorillas).
- 7 May – Michael Pennington, 82, English actor (Return of the Jedi, The Iron Lady), co-founder of the English Shakespeare Company and writer.
- 10 May – Ralph Ottey, 102, Jamaican-born British author and World War II veteran.
- 13 May – Peter Simpson, 81, English footballer (Arsenal). (death announced on this date)
- 14 May – Alan Rothwell, 89, English actor (Coronation Street, Brookside, Heartbeat) and television presenter.
- 15 May –
  - Jill Curzon, 87, English actress (Daleks' Invasion Earth 2150 A.D.). (death announced on this date)
  - Dame Felicity Lott, 79, English soprano, cancer.
  - Jimmy Mann, 73, English footballer (Bristol City, Barnsley, Doncaster Rovers). (death announced on this date)
- 17 May – M. J. K. Smith, 92, English cricketer (Leicestershire, Warwickshire, national team).
- 19 May – John Middleton, 70, English footballer (Bradford City, Macclesfield Town). (death announced on this date)
- 20 May – Mike Galloway, 60, English-born Scottish football player (Halifax Town, Celtic, national team) and coach. (death announced on this date)
- 22 May –
  - Bill Albury, 92, English footballer (Portsmouth, Gillingham, Yeovil Town). (death announced on this date)
  - Dick Parry, 83, English saxophonist (Pink Floyd).
- 23 May –
  - Brian Large, 87, English opera director.
  - Trevor Meath, 82, English footballer (Walsall, Lincoln City). (death announced on this date)
- 24 May – Betty Roe, 95, English composer, singer and vocal coach. (death announced on this date)
- 25 May – Flick Rea, 88, English Liberal Democrat politician, Camden Borough councillor (1986–2021).
- 26 May – Linda Mullins, 86, English greyhound racing trainer. (death announced on this date)
- 27 May – Maureen Duffy, 92, English poet, playwright and novelist.
- 29 May – Lauren Bennett, 36, English singer (G.R.L., "Party Rock Anthem").
- 31 May –
  - John Kear, 71, English rugby league coach (Sheffield Eagles, Wakefield Trinity, Welsh national team).
  - Matthew Spender, 81, English sculptor and writer. (death announced on this date)

=== June ===
- 3 June – Bobby Tambling, 84, English football player (Chelsea, Crystal Palace, national team) and manager.
- 4 June – Patrick Godfrey, 93, English actor (Maurice, The Count of Monte Cristo, Ever After).
- 5 June – Anthony Head, 72, English actor (Buffy the Vampire Slayer, Merlin, Ted Lasso), complications from pneumonia. (death announced on this date)
- 9 June – Keith Piper, 56, English cricketer (Warwickshire), cancer.
- 11 June –
  - Nigel Cabourn, 76, English fashion designer, cancer.
  - David Hockney, 88, English painter (A Bigger Splash, Mr and Mrs Clark and Percy, The Blue Guitar), draughtsman and printmaker.
  - Kenny Jackett, 64, English-born Welsh football player (Watford, Wales national team) and manager (Millwall).
- 14 June – Dave Greenslade, 83, English composer and keyboardist (Colosseum, Greenslade, If). (death announced on this date)
- 15 June
  - Trevor Hitchen, 99, English footballer (Southport, Wigan Athletic, Oldham Athletic).
  - Alan Ward, 78, English cricketer (Derbyshire, Border, Leicestershire).
- 17 June – Bobby Harrison, 95, English footballer (Carlisle United, Stockport County, Mossley). (death announced on this date).
- 21 June – Alan Murray, 76, English football player (Doncaster Rovers) and manager (Hartlepool United, Darlington). (death announced on this date)
- 24 June – Sir Roy Goode, 93, English lawyer.
- 29 June – Dame Penelope Keith, 86, English actress (The Good Life, To the Manor Born, Executive Stress), cancer. (death announced on this date)

=== July ===
- 2 July – Paul Dobson, 63, English footballer (Hartlepool United, Torquay United, Scarborough). (death announced on this date)
- 3 July
  - Alan Banks, 87, English footballer (Liverpool, Exeter City, Plymouth Argyle).
  - Peter Higham, 95, English footballer (Wigan Athletic, Nottingham Forest, Buxton).
- 5 July –
  - Beaky, 81, English musician (Dave Dee, Dozy, Beaky, Mick & Tich). (death announced on this date)
  - Christian Moran, 42, English-Korean drummer.
- 7 July –
  - Joanna Pettet, 83, English actress (Casino Royale, The Night of the Generals, The Evil).
  - William Taylor, 69, English Anglican clergyman, dean of Portsmouth Cathedral (2000–2002).
- 9 July – Ann Widdecombe, 78, English Conservative turned Reform UK politician.
- 10 July – Patricia Greene, 95, English actress (The Archers). (death announced on this date)
- 11 July – Dermot Murnaghan, 68, English journalist, news reporter and television host, prostate cancer.
- 18 July – Tony Thorpe, 80, English guitarist and singer (The Rubettes). (death announced on this date)
- 20 July –
  - Kevin Keegan, 75, English footballer (Liverpool, national team) and manager (national team), cancer. (death announced on this date)
  - Edwin Smith, 92, English cricketer (Derbyshire). (death announced on this date)
- 22 July – Frank Barrow, 83, English rugby league player (St Helens, Leigh) and coach (Swinton).
- 24 July – Fred Kemp, 80, English footballer (Halifax Town, Southampton, Blackpool). (death announced on this date)
- 25 July – Bill Oddie, 85, English wildlife presenter (Springwatch, Birding with Bill Oddie) and comedian (The Goodies).
- 27 July – Tom Chadbon, 80, English actor (Doctor Who, Tess, Casino Royale). (death announced on this date)
- 28 July – Mike Smedley, 84, English cricketer (Nottinghamshire).

=== August ===
- 2 August – Paul Bradshaw, 72, English footballer (Burnley, Sheffield Wednesday).
- 3 August – Robin Cowling, 82, English rugby union player (Gloucester, Leicester Tigers, national team). (death announced on this date)
- 8 August – Phil Parkes, 79, English footballer (Wolverhampton Wanderers, Vancouver Whitecaps, Chicago Sting).
- 9 August – Cheryl Hall, 76, English actress (Doctor Who, EastEnders, The Bill).
- 11 August – Sheila Mathews, 99, English actress, singer and dancer.
- 13 August –
  - Derry Brownson, 55, English musician (EMF), brain tumour.
  - Jack Crabtree, 87, English painter and teacher. (death announced on this date)
- 14 August –
  - Eddie Richardson, 90, English gangster (Richardson Gang).
  - Jimmy Rimmer, 78, English footballer (Arsenal, Aston Villa, national team).
- 17 August – Mike Bailey, 84, English footballer (Charlton Athletic, Wolverhampton Wanderers, national team), complications from dementia.
- 20 August – Terry Dyson, 91, English footballer (Tottenham Hotspur, Colchester United, Guildford City). (death announced on this date)
- 27 August – Terry Matthews, 90, English footballer (Aldershot, Gillingham, West Ham United). (death announced on this date)

=== September ===
- 1 September – Alan Knight, 65, English footballer (Portsmouth) and coach (Horndean, Dorchester Town), prostate cancer.
- 2 September –
  - Jimmy Batten, 70, English boxer, complications from Parkinson's disease. (death announced on this date)
  - David McDermott, 38, English footballer (Walsall, Kidderminster Harriers, York City). (death announced on this date)
- 4 September –
  - Craig Douglas, 85, English singer.
  - Richard O'Sullivan, 82, English actor (Man About the House, Robin's Nest, Dick Turpin).
- 5 September – Shirley Strum Kenny, 92, English scholar and university president.
- 6 September – Stephen Walker, 61, English-born Northern Irish journalist and author (BBC Northern Ireland). (death announced on this date)
- 7 September – Tony Buss, 87, English cricketer (Sussex).
- 8 September – Harry Burrows, 85, English footballer (Aston Villa, Stoke City, Plymouth Argyle).
- 10 September –
  - Malcolm Dawes, 82, English footballer (Hartlepool, Aldershot, Workington), complications from dementia. (death announced on this date)
  - Ken Todd, 69, English footballer (Wolverhampton Wanderers, Port Vale, Portsmouth). (death announced on this date)
- 13 September – Ian Berry, 92, English photojournalist.
- 15 September –
  - John Delaney, 84, English footballer (Wycombe Wanderers F.C., Bournemouth, national amateur team).
  - Kevin Miller, 57, English football player (Exeter City, Watford, Crystal Palace) and coach.
  - Ben Saunders, 43, English-born Dutch singer (Follow That Dream).
- 18 September
  - Stephanie Cole, 84, English actress (Open All Hours, Doc Martin, Coronation Street), complications from Alzheimer's disease.
  - Colin Powers, 70, British boxer, cancer. (death announced on this date)
  - Jimmy Revie, 79, British boxer, complications from dementia. (death announced on this date)
- 19 September –
  - Paul Lloyd, 57, English boxer. (death announced on this date)
  - Keith Wakefield, 78, English politician, leader of Leeds City Council (2003–2004, 2010–2015).
- 27 September –
  - Pac, 40, English professional wrestler (AEW, WWE, Dragongate).
  - Ken Taylor, 91, English cricketer (Yorkshire, England) and footballer (Huddersfield Town).
- 28 September – Bob Davenport, 94, English traditional folk singer. (death announced on this date)
- 29 September – Courtney Meppen-Walter, 32, English footballer (Glossop North End, Chorley, Bury).

=== October ===
- 2 October – Geoff Hickson, 87, English footballer (Crewe Alexandra, Stoke City). (death announced on this date)
- 3 October – Hugh Wooldridge, 74, English theatre director, producer and writer.
- 9 October – Les Latcham, 83, English footballer (Burnley, Plymouth Argyle, Bradford City). (death announced on this date)
- 10 October – Freddie Foreman, 94, English gangster (Kray twins).
- 12 October –
  - Brian Jones, 85, English saxophonist (The Undertakers).
  - Doug Loft, 39, English footballer (Port Vale, Gillingham, Brighton & Hove Albion). (death announced on this date)
  - John Mocatta, 90, English cricketer (Oxford University).
- 13 October – Ken Friar, 92, English football executive, president of Arsenal F.C. (since 2020).
- 16 October – Alan Brown, 90, English cricketer (Kent, national team). (death announced on this date)
- 22 October – John Vaughan, 62, English football player (Cambridge United, Preston North End) and coach (Bradford City).
- 24 October – Barry Murphy, 86, English footballer (Barnsley, South Shields). (death announced on this date)
- 27 October –
  - Peter Dobing, 87, English footballer (Stoke City, Blackburn Rovers, Manchester City). (death announced on this date)
  - Phil McDonald, English audio engineer. (death announced on this date)
