= Murder of Teresa De Simone =

1979 murder of an Englishwoman

Teresa De Simone
- De Simone
- Born: 24 June 1957
- Died: 5 December 1979 (aged 22)
- Cause of death: Strangulation
- Body discovered: Tom Tackle public house, Southampton, Hampshire

Teresa Elena De Simone (24 June 1957 – 5 December 1979) was murdered in Southampton, England, in 1979. Her murder led to one of the longest proven cases of a miscarriage of justice in English legal history. The murder occurred outside the Tom Tackle pub and was the subject of a three-year police investigation which resulted in the arrest of Sean Hodgson. Hodgson was convicted of the murder by a unanimous jury verdict in 1982 and was sentenced to life imprisonment. (Note: Paragraph 2) After serving 27 years in prison he was exonerated and released in March 2009. DNA analysis of semen samples that had been preserved from the original crime scene showed that they could not have come from him. (Note: Paragraph 6)

As a result of Hodgson's appeal, Operation Iceberg was created by the Criminal Cases Review Commission (CCRC) with the aim of using DNA evidence in pre-1990 rape or murder cases. This led to the review of 240 other convictions. The CCRC also requested that the Crown Prosecution Service identify and review similar murder cases from the time before DNA testing was available. In September 2009, on the basis of DNA evidence from his exhumed body, police named David Andrew Lace as the likely killer. Lace, who was 17 at the time of the murder, had confessed to police in 1983 that he had raped and killed De Simone, but officers refused to believe him. Lace committed suicide in December 1988.

On 27 October 2012, three years after his release, Sean Hodgson died from emphysema.

== Murder ==
On the evening of 4 December 1979, 22-year-old Teresa De Simone had been working as a part-time barmaid in the Tom Tackle public house (now called The Mayflower Village public house) in Commercial Road, Southampton. (Note: Paragraph 7) By day she was employed as a full-time clerk for the Southern Gas Board. She had been employed at the pub for less than a month, working two evenings each week, partly to widen her social circle and partly to supplement her income to pay for the Ford Escort car that she had bought three months previously. The pub was located centrally in the city, only 50 yards (46 metres) from the police station and law courts, and near the city's central train station and the Gaumont Theatre (now The Mayflower). When her shift at the Tom Tackle ended at 23:00 (11:00 p.m.) she went on to a night club in nearby London Road, in the company of her friend Jenni Savage. Although the discothèque was a relatively short distance from the public house, they travelled in Savage's car, leaving De Simone's Ford Escort in the pub car park.

While at the discothèque, De Simone and Savage were together throughout the evening, and De Simone did not consume any alcoholic drinks. They left the night club together, and Savage drove De Simone back to the Tom Tackle car park, arriving sometime between 00:30 and 01:00 (12:30 and 1:00 a.m.) on 5 December. Savage testified that she drove into the covered parking area and that they sat chatting for a while before De Simone made the short walk to her car, at which point Savage reversed out and drove away from the scene. Savage was the last witness to see De Simone before she was killed.

When De Simone's mother, Mary Sedotti, discovered she had not returned home by the morning, she expressed concern, and her husband Michael, Teresa's stepfather, drove to the pub where he observed De Simone's car still parked, but did not make any closer investigation. Shortly after 10:00, Anthony Pocock, the landlord of the Tom Tackle, was expecting a commercial delivery to the premises, and believing De Simone had deliberately left the car overnight he decided to try to move it to allow the delivery through. (Note: Paragraph 9) Inside he discovered De Simone's partially clothed body on the back seat. He immediately called the police.

== Police investigation ==
=== Forensic investigation ===
The pathologist arrived at the scene at 11:45. His report of the crime scene described "the deceased lying on her back, with her leg bent at the thigh and knee, with the knee resting against the back of the seat, and the left thigh running along the edge of the seat with the leg hanging over the edge. The body was naked from the waist down and her left breast was exposed. Part of a pair of tights was pulled down to the left ankle. The remainder of her underwear and the other part of her tights was found in the passenger well." The time of death was placed at between 01:00 and 02:00 (1:00 and 2:00 a.m.) 5 December. In a statement issued at the time, Detective Superintendent John Porter said: "It is 99% certain that the girl was murdered, attacked, chatted to or met by her killer in a matter of seconds after Jenni Savage left her. He could have been waiting, and seen Jenni leave. It is possible that he was actually sitting in Teresa's car, as we found the nearside [passenger] door unlocked."

The pathologist determined, based on the presence of "white frothy mucous" in the victim's mouth, (Note: Paragraph 10) that the cause of death was a "long, slow strangulation". Visible on De Simone's neck were "a series of multiple, roughly horizontal, linear, bruised abrasions on the front of the neck [which] matched the description of a [gold chain and crucifix] which the deceased had been said to be wearing that evening", indicating the possibility that this was used as the ligature and leading to the tabloid press dubbing the murderer the "Crucifix Killer". The chain was not present when the body was discovered and has never been recovered. (Note: Paragraph 11)

Semen was present in the vaginal canal, "in sufficient concentration to indicate that it had been present no more than three to four hours before death." As De Simone's movements for the entire evening previous to her death were known and documented, the semen could only have come from her assailant. Evidence of bruising and tearing of the genitalia demonstrated that the intercourse was non-consensual. A number of vaginal, anal, oral and control swabs were taken by the pathologist, and subsequent forensic examination demonstrated that the semen was produced by a male with the blood type "A" or "AB". Further swabs were taken from De Simone's clothing and the car.

The victim's leather handbag and personal belongings, including a diary, were found in multiple locations within the vicinity of the crime scene, although her car keys, Rotary wristwatch, two necklaces, three rings and a bracelet have never been recovered.

=== Suspects ===
The investigation was headed by Detective Superintendent John Porter of Southampton Criminal Investigation Department (C.I.D.) In the 12 months after the murder, police "interviewed 30,000 people, took 2,500 statements and traced 500 people who were in the area on the night of the murder. At one point the list of possible suspects totalled 300 men." Despite De Simone's possessions being taken, police did not believe that robbery had been the motive; they were convinced that this was a red herring and that she was the victim of a "vicious rape by a brutal and merciless killer". Police received two anonymous letters, postmarked 12 and 27 December in Southampton which gave information regarding the location of the killer. The writer was never identified, and the eventual arrest of Hodgson led police to dismiss them as a hoax at the time of Hodgson's trial. Nine months after the murder, while Hodgson was already in custody for an unrelated offence, (Note: Paragraph 15) two anonymous telephone calls were made to the police in which the caller confessed to killing De Simone. Porter released a statement to the Southern Daily Echo at the time in which he said: "The calls came from a man who said that he had committed the murder. He gave the impression that he was under severe strain and was asking for help and advice. From the nature of his conversation we think there is a possibility that the calls could be genuine."

== Arrest of Sean Hodgson ==
Sean Hodgson (also known as Robert Graham Hodgson, originally from Tow Law, County Durham) first came to the attention of the police on 6 December 1979 when he was arrested in Southampton for an unrelated offence of theft from a vehicle, (Note: Paragraph 13) having arrived in the city two days previously. On 7 December he gave a statement to the police implicating another individual in the murder of De Simone, but police were able to eliminate this suspect from their enquiries as he was of blood type "O". (Note: Paragraph 14) On 9 December Hodgson was charged in relation to the theft and remanded in custody. He was interviewed by detectives on several occasions about De Simone's murder; however, as his whereabouts at the time of the murder could not be verified, and police knew he was of blood type "A", he was briefly investigated.

Sean Hodgson, photographed around the time of his arrest

Hodgson grew up surrounded by a large family, and had been placed in a borstal at age 11. He was, nevertheless, described by one schoolmate as a "normal teenager", and his arrest shocked his home community. Prior to his arrest

[Hodgson] had numerous previous convictions for offences of dishonesty and deception, as well as many related to offences involving motor vehicles. There was one conviction for unlawful sexual intercourse and another for being in possession of an offensive weapon. There were however no convictions for offences of violence. There is no doubt that even at that stage he was a disturbed personality, with a history of significant self-harming. We now know, and would admit in evidence, that he attended a clinic in 1978 after several incidents of overdosing. He was assessed as having "a severe personality disorder" and he was a "compulsive liar". (Note: Paragraph 12)

On 16 May 1980, he pleaded guilty at Southampton to theft and was granted conditional bail awaiting sentence. He was arrested again in London on 4 June and charged with further offences. On 14 July 1980 he was sentenced to three years' imprisonment. During this trial he confessed to "a large number of relatively minor offences", although it was found that he could not have committed all of them and some had actually been perpetrated during the period that he had been in custody.

On 11 December 1980, Hodgson asked to see a priest, Father Frank Moran, to whom he confessed that he was having nightmares and the face of a woman he had killed "kept coming back to him". (Note: Paragraph 18) He said that the murder had happened in Southampton the previous year and "that he was particularly troubled because this was around the anniversary of her death". He repeated the confession to a prison officer the following day, (Note: Paragraph 19) and subsequently wrote a note which stated: "After much deliberation and thought and confession with the priest here in Wandsworth, after all the trouble I have caused, not only to you, the police, but myself, the mental torture I have gone through, the family of the person concerned, I must for my own sanity and the punishment I will receive for this horrible crime, I wish now that it was me that was dead and not the person I killed at the Tom Tackle pub. ... I did the murder, why I don't know. So all I can say is let justice be done". (Note: Paragraph 20)

Over the next two weeks, Hodgson gave more confessions and was also escorted to Southampton where he showed the investigating officers where he had disposed of some of De Simone's property. (Note: Paragraph 24) It was not routine to make audio recordings of police interviews at the time, and much of the original police paperwork from the case has not been located as of December 2009. What is known, however, is that the statements taken from Hodgson by the police at that time contained "detail [which] could only have been known to the man who was responsible for the crime" or the investigating officers. (Note: Paragraph 17) Although the murder had received wide media coverage, the police had not revealed all of the significant details. (Note: Paragraph 36) At Hodgson's subsequent murder trial these were described as the "secret details". (Note: Paragraph 37) It was never investigated whether any of the officers taking Hodgson's statements had in fact disclosed any of these secret details to him when they interviewed him.

On 25 December, Hodgson wrote a further confession, claiming to have killed a man in Covent Garden, London, and on 27 December confessed that he had "also murdered a homosexual in a flat in North London at the end of '78 or '79". Investigations showed that the confessions were false and neither of the crimes had actually happened. (Note: Paragraph 28)

=== Hodgson trial ===
I would like to tell the members of the jury why I can't go in the witness box is because I am a pathological liar. Secondly, I did not kill Teresa De Simone. Thirdly, every time I have been nicked by the police, which is on many occasions, I have made false confessions to crimes I have not committed, and this is the reason why I am not going into the box.

— Unsworn statement made by Hodgson. (Note: Paragraph 38)

Hodgson was tried for the murder of Teresa De Simone at Winchester Crown Court in 1982. During the course of the 15-day trial, Hodgson chose not to give evidence or submit to cross examination.

For the defence, Robin Grey QC, explained to the jury that such was the extent of Hodgson's compulsive lying that he had confessed to 200 different crimes, including murders that had not happened. The Crown's case against Hodgson was that he "under the influence of drink, broke into the deceased's car, intending to steal it, but then fell asleep on the back seat. When the deceased returned to her car she put her handbag onto the back seat and brushed against [him]. He seized her by the back of her jumper, twisted it and strangled her, and when she was dead or dying he raped her, removing her underwear and tights with such force that one leg of the tights was torn from the other. Thereafter he made away from the scene after taking various items from the deceased." (Note: Paragraph 8) Hodgson's confessions were a significant part of the case against him. The jury retired to consider their verdict at 11:00 a.m. on 5 February 1982, and their unanimous guilty verdict was returned at 14:15 (2:15 p.m.) the same day.

The judge, Mr. Justice Sheldon, told Hodgson: "It is a verdict with which I entirely agree. I have no doubt whatsoever that you were guilty of this appalling, horrible crime of killing that girl."

==== Appeals ====
Hodgson appealed the conviction, but his pre-trial confessions, his knowledge of the "secret details" and his refusal to take the stand during the trial led to the application for leave to appeal being refused: (Note: Paragraph 39 and Paragraph 40) "[I]n 1998 an inquiry was made by solicitors then acting on behalf of the appellant to the Forensic Science Service to discover whether the relevant exhibits associated with the murder were available. Presumably that request would have been made in order to see whether further testing might then be possible. The inquiry failed. The response from the Forensic Science Service, as we are told today, was that none of the exhibits had been retained." (Note: Paragraph 41) Hodgson, who was at that time in the prison hospital, became more seriously ill, his solicitor was unable to take further instructions, and the line of inquiry was closed.

Hodgson continued to maintain his innocence; convicted murderers sentenced to mandatory life imprisonment in the United Kingdom have their cases reviewed by the Parole Board before the end of the minimum fixed term, averaging 14 years. However, continually professing innocence "[is] a good indicator of continuing risk", leading them to be ineligible for parole.

In March 2008, Hodgson responded to an advertisement in Inside Time, a monthly newspaper for prisoners, placed by Mayfair-based solicitors Julian Young and Co. who specialised in appeals against conviction. The solicitors took on Hodgson's case, and Rag Chand spent four months attempting to track down the swab samples which the FSS claimed had been destroyed at least 10 years previously.

As the police claimed that there were no surviving papers in the case, and the senior investigating officers had since died, Chand relied largely upon newspaper cuttings to piece together what had happened. Chand, who acted pro bono for Hodgson, said of his investigation: "The search was the most difficult thing I have encountered in my personal and professional life. It was like finding a needle in a haystack. I spent months chasing false leads and implacable bureaucracy but I was not prepared to accept this, as instinct told me that the samples would be somewhere. I persevered because I had a gut feeling that something was wrong." Eventually, Chand's probing led to the rediscovery of an archive of evidence on an industrial estate in the Midlands "which they appeared to have forgotten about". Stored here were all of the swabs taken by the pathologist in December 1979. In December 2008 the Crown Prosecution Service (CPS) notified Julian Young of the initial results of the DNA analysis, and on 30 January 2009 it was confirmed that the semen detected on the vaginal and the anal swabs could not have originated from Hodgson. (Note: Paragraph 43)

===== Acquittal and Release =====
Sean Hodgson (arm raised) and his brother Peter stand outside the court where less than an hour earlier Hodgson was acquitted of murder.

The case was then referred to the Criminal Cases Review Commission, which was informed on 26 February 2009 by the Special Crime Division of the CPS that the Crown would not oppose the appeal. The case then went to the Court of Appeal, where, in light of the new DNA evidence available, Hodgson's conviction was quashed. The judgement, which was delivered by Lord Judge, the Lord Chief Justice of England and Wales, on 18 March 2009 concluded: "The decision leaves some important, unanswered questions. Perhaps the most important is that we do not know who raped and killed the dead girl. We can but hope for the sake of the appellant and the family of the murdered girl that her killer may yet be identified and brought to justice. But for now all we can do is to quash the conviction. It is accordingly quashed. The appellant will be discharged. There will be no new trial." (Note: Paragraph 45)

Accompanied by his brother Peter, Hodgson walked out of the Royal Courts of Justice a free and innocent man after 27 years of wrongful imprisonment. Hodgson's barrister at the 1982 trial, Robin Grey QC, was there to shake his hand as he was released. Grey said: "As a human being I feel glad that we no longer have capital punishment. As a defence barrister I didn't get him off, and I have bitter feelings of guilt about that."

Hodgson may have been eligible for up to £1 million in compensation. A fund was opened and an interim compensation payment of £250,000 paid into it after two MPs intervened to cut through administrative "red tape". The fund is protected by law to shield Hodgson from "gold diggers". As a result of his imprisonment Hodgson had schizophrenia and depression and, whilst imprisoned, his identity was stolen making it difficult to access insurance and housing.

===== December 2010 Arrest =====
In December 2010 Hodgson was returned to prison awaiting trial over new and unconnected allegations of rape and sexual assault of a 22-year-old woman with learning difficulties at a care home in Bishop Auckland, County Durham, in August 2010. On 3 March 2011, Hodgson pleaded guilty at Durham Crown Court to sexual touching but denied rape. David Crook, prosecuting, said that he would offer no evidence on the rape charge, which was withdrawn. Hodgson's solicitor, Julian Young, said: "The wrongful imprisonment for 27 years of my client has had a devastating effect on his life since he was cleared of the murder he did not commit [and he] has been gripped by a number of personal difficulties, including a degree of alcohol abuse." The judge, Mr. Justice Prince, requested the preparation of pre-sentence reports to address the issue of Hodgson's dangerousness, and Hodgson was remanded in custody. On 13 May 2011 he was sentenced to a three-year community order. The judge said that the total of 156 days Hodgson had been remanded in custody prior to sentence would be taken into account, and told Hodgson he "could walk free should he agree to complete a psychiatric order imposed by the court, but his barrister Martin Heslop QC, said his client 'clearly bears a great resentment against a criminal justice system which has deprived him of 27 years of liberty'" and rejected the option.

On 27 October 2012, three years after his release, it was reported that Sean Hodgson had died from emphysema.

== Operation Iceberg ==
The availability of the new DNA evidence led police to re-open the case, codenamed Operation Iceberg. On 25 March 2009 Detective Chief Inspector Phil McTavish, heading the investigation, announced that the DNA profile had been checked against the United Kingdom National DNA Database but no matches had been found. He said "A number of key witnesses have already been located, interviewed and are assisting the investigation. All persons screened to date have been eliminated against the DNA profile. We will screen as many people as we consider necessary." On 11 August 2009 McTavish released a statement that a prime suspect had been identified, adding, "While work is ongoing to maximise DNA evidence, the inquiry team is confident they are on the right track and hopefully could be close to solving this 30-year-old murder".

The suspect (later identified as David Lace) was discovered when the profile of the killer showed a partial match on the national database, which belonged to a sibling of a previous suspect. A further sample was taken from another sibling, who was not on the database, to help confirm the match via a process called familial searching. At first the police refused to release the identity of the new prime suspect, except to reveal that he had committed suicide in 1988, and had confessed to De Simone's murder while in custody for an unrelated crime in 1983, 18 months after Hodgson's conviction. His body was exhumed at Kingston cemetery in Portsmouth on 12 August 2009 in order to compare his DNA to that found at the crime scene. Hampshire Constabulary said the breakthrough in the case was only possible because of advances in forensic science and tests on the body would take six weeks, after which a file on the dead suspect could then be submitted to the Crown Prosecution Service. Visitors to the cemetery in Portsmouth said the grave of the suspect had no headstone and was untended. Police revealed that the suspect's confession was one of seven which had been made since Hodgson's conviction.

Hodgson's lawyer, Julian Young, said the confessions had been vital information which could have freed his client much earlier, and he was shocked police had not acted on it or passed it on. "If it is true these confessions were not followed up by police or passed on to Mr Hodgson's legal team then, or to me as part of the appeal, it is surprising and very disappointing. This may raise serious questions about the way in which the police operated and their failure or unwillingness to disclose evidence. I did not know seven people made admissions. It would have been highly relevant evidence."

=== David Lace ===
David Andrew Lace (born David Andrew Williams on 2 September 1962, Portsmouth) had spent a significant amount of his life in care or boys' homes and hostels and was considered a loner with an aggressive temper. He changed his surname when he was adopted by the Lace family as a child.

He received his first criminal conviction in November 1977, aged 15, for burglary. Between 1977 and 1984, he accrued six more convictions and was sentenced to a care order until the age of 18 for robbery in August 1978. In January 1980 he was convicted of two further crimes including theft of property from his lodgings the night before De Simone's murder. He was subsequently convicted of a series of burglaries committed in Portsmouth for which he received an 18-month custodial sentence of which he served 9 months. Following his release he committed robbery again and was sentenced at Portsmouth Crown Court to five years and nine months imprisonment, which he served at HMP Dartmoor.

Lace was released from Dartmoor in July 1987 and settled in nearby Brixham, Devon, returning to visit family in Portsmouth in 1988. He intimated that he was depressed about his past actions and in December 1988 gave away his possessions and resigned from his job. He was last seen by friends between 7–8 December and was found dead by his landlord on 9 December. Postmortem examination revealed superficial wounds to his wrist, ingestion of analgesics and a plastic bag over his head. The cause of death was determined to be asphyxiation and his death was determined as suicide by the coroner. Lace was buried in Kingston Cemetery, Portsmouth on 20 December 1988. After a cross check on the DNA database found that the DNA from the murder scene showed a partial match with that of a relative of Lace, detectives requested a sample from Andrina Foster, Lace's biological sister, which gave a familial match with the murderer's DNA. As a result of this development, Lace's body was exhumed on 12 August 2009 for DNA testing as part of Operation Iceberg.

On 17 September 2009 DCI McTavish confirmed that the comparison of the DNA from the exhumed suspect's body and the DNA evidence from the crime scene presented "a complete match" and belonged to David Andrew Lace. "The evidence overwhelmingly bears out [Lace's] involvement in the rape and murder of Teresa De Simone and we are not seeking anyone else in relation to this matter."

The Crown Prosecutor for Hampshire & Isle of Wight stated "the evidence would have been sufficient to prosecute David Lace, if he were alive, with the offences of the rape and murder of Teresa De Simone. But this is in no sense a declaration that he was guilty of the offences. Had Mr Lace lived, our decision would merely have authorised the police to begin the legal process by charging him. Only after trial does a jury decide whether a person is guilty or not, on a higher standard of proof – beyond reasonable doubt."

==== Lace's confession ====
Lace confessed to the murder on 17 September 1983. He gave a statement to police that he had stolen a rucksack and cash on 4 December 1979 from the care home in Portsmouth where he had been living and then walked to Southampton. He was present at the rear of the Tom Tackle pub when De Simone was dropped off by Savage, and then approached De Simone when she got into her own vehicle. He first knocked on the window and asked the time but then forced his way into the driver's seat beside her and locked the doors to prevent her escaping. Once inside he sexually assaulted her and strangled her using the passenger seatbelt in the car. He then took her handbag and jewellery, and hid for approximately 10 minutes before heading to Southampton Central station and catching a train back to Portsmouth.

Because he had wrongly described significant evidence (including the car and De Simone's clothes), police had dismissed his statement, filing it along with six other confessions to the crime. Hodgson's legal team was never made aware of its existence.

==== Search for jewellery ====
In his confession Lace described how he had disposed of De Simone's jewellery by throwing the items on to the railway embankment beneath Copnor Bridge in Portsmouth. In September 2009 a team of six British Transport Police officers with specialist training in forensic search techniques spent two days examining the area in an attempt to recover the jewellery. Although the ground had been the subject of extensive redevelopment in previous years and recovery of the items was considered unlikely, detectives authorised the operation to ensure every attempt had been made to find and return them to her parents. None of the items were discovered. DCI McTavish said of the search: "It is recognised that in the years since Teresa's murder there has been a lot of disturbance and redevelopment around the railway track, but there was still a possibility that items may have lain undisturbed. Although we have not been able to recover any items linked to either Teresa or the suspect it was important we did everything to explore this final aspect of the case."

== IPCC assessment ==
The case was referred to the Independent Police Complaints Commission (IPCC) on 16 September 2009 to determine whether there was evidence of misconduct or negligence by the police during the original murder investigation, the handling of Lace's confession in 1983 and the request from Hodgson's solicitors in 1998 for forensic examination of exhibits. The head of Southampton CID, Detective Chief Superintendent Shirley Dinnell, stated that the referral was voluntarily made by Hampshire Constabulary because of the miscarriage of justice that had taken place and to ensure transparency of inquiries.

On 28 October 2009 Mike Franklin, the IPCC commissioner for the south east, announced that as a result of the assessment no further investigation of the police's actions would be undertaken as many of the senior investigating officers were now deceased, and any new investigation "would serve no purpose in identifying areas of discipline or learning opportunities due to the passage of time." As a result of the case, however, the IPCC implemented procedural changes to ensure all exhibits relating to a case would now be kept until a convicted person had completed their sentence.

== Commentary ==
Julian Young, Hodgson's lawyer, also commented that Hodgson did not receive any official support to adjust to life after 27 years. Inmates who serve out a long sentence undergo a long process of re-integration into society. "A person released after a conviction is quashed is not entitled to the same level of support; Sean was, in fact, released with a one-off discharge payment of £46. That was it." Compensatory action can be difficult to obtain. A compensation fund exists "from which, unbelievably, the government deducts 'board and lodging' for the time spent in prison." In the years it can take for the funds to be cleared, many victims of miscarriages of justice live off social security payments.

Gerry Conlon, who was wrongly imprisoned for 15 years, also warns that after-release support is inadequate. After the imposed routine of prison life, outside prison "you are lost". Suicidal thoughts and attempts, panic attacks, nightmares and drug use are common. "Most people released after miscarriages of justice end up as recluses, their marriages fail, they aren't talking to their children, they become drug addicts and alcoholics, they die premature deaths."

Hodgson's release has sparked debate about the use of the death penalty, particularly about its fallibility. Neil Durkin of Amnesty International commented in a piece for The Daily Telegraph: "[W]e had the deeply sad case of Sean Hodgson, the man from Hampshire who ended up being behind bars for 27 years, not least because the prosecution service suppressed exculpatory DNA evidence that could have set him free a decade earlier. He was totally innocent, should never have been imprisoned in the first place and on release joins the ranks of those – eventually – rescued from their judicial fate". Durkin characterized the Hodgson case as "a warning not to trust a justice system never to be wrong".

== See also ==
- Joseph Kappen, a Welsh man posthumously identified as a serial killer in 2002 using the same familial DNA profiling technique used to finally identify De Simone's killer
- Kirk Bloodsworth
- Murder of Linda Cook
- Stephen Downing case
- List of miscarriage of justice cases

== Notes ==
=== Appeal notes ===
"Regina v Robert Graham Hodgson England and Wales Court of Appeal (Criminal Division) 490". Bailii. 18 March 2009.
