= Murder of Linda Cook =

1986 murder in Portsmouth, England

Linda Cook
- Linda Cook
- Born: 6 December 1962
- Died: 9 December 1986 (aged 24)
- Cause of death: Asphyxiation
- Body discovered: Merry Row, Portsmouth, Hampshire, England
- Height: 1.499 m (4 ft 11.0 in)
- Parent: James Cook

The murder of Linda Cook was committed in Portsmouth on 9 December 1986. The subsequent trial led to a miscarriage of justice when Michael Shirley, an 18-year-old Royal Navy sailor, was wrongly convicted of the crime and sentenced to life imprisonment. In 1992 his case was highlighted as one of 110 possible miscarriages of justice in a report presented to the Home Office by the National Association of Probation Officers and justice groups Liberty and Conviction. His conviction was eventually quashed in 2003 by the Court of Appeal after the DNA profile extracted from semen samples recovered from the victim's body was proven not to be his. Cook's murder took place shortly after six sexual assaults had been committed in the Buckland area of the city, and the killer was initially dubbed the Beast of Buckland by the news media. When police revealed that footprint evidence had been recovered and launched a search for matching shoes, the case became known as the "Cinderella murder". Because of the brutal nature of the murder and the preceding sex attacks, Hampshire police were under public pressure to quickly make an arrest.

Shirley's later exoneration of the murder after serving 16 years of his sentence is significant as it is the first time that a UK court quashed a previous conviction on the basis of presentation of new DNA evidence. It was also the first occasion in which the Criminal Cases Review Commission supported an appeal on the basis of newly available DNA evidence. After serving the minimum tariff of 15 years, Shirley would have been released from prison had he confessed the killing to the parole board, but he refused to do so and said: "I would have died in prison rather than admit something I didn't do. I was prepared to stay in forever if necessary to prove my innocence."

== The murder ==
Linda Cook was a 24-year-old barmaid, living at the home of Linda Gray on Victoria Road North, Portsmouth. (Note: Paragraph 14) Cook had been in a relationship with Gray's son since August 1986 and had moved into the Gray family home at the beginning of November 1986. Gray's son had been remanded to a detention centre on 14 November 1986, but Cook had stayed on in the premises. Gray was able to account for Cook's whereabouts for most of 8 December 1986, and stated that at approximately 23:30 Cook went to visit a friend in Sultan Road, Portsmouth. Shortly after midnight on 9 December 1986 she left the friend's house to walk home. Some time between 00:30 and 01:00 she was attacked on an area of wasteland known as "Merry Row", adjacent to Lake Road. (Note: Paragraph 2) Her assailant raped and strangled her, stamping upon her several times and with such force that her jaw and spine were fractured, her larynx crushed, and imprints of his right athletic shoe were retained on her abdomen. (Note: Paragraph 23) The attack took at least 15 minutes. (Note: Paragraph 4) (Note: Paragraph 27) Her naked body was discovered later that day.

A number of vaginal, anal, and vulval swabs were taken by the pathologist, and subsequent forensic examination confirmed the presence of semen, from which the blood type of the killer was determined. Trace evidence was also gathered, including fibres from beneath Cook's fingernails. (Note: Paragraph 21) It was noted that her fingernails "were long and unbroken, suggesting that she did not scratch her attacker, or at least did not do so with any ferocity." Her underwear was found nearby, and subsequently tested negative for traces of semen. (Note: Paragraph 11) (Note: Paragraph 12) This, combined with the knowledge of her whereabouts since 10:00 the previous morning, meant that "the semen found inside [her] vagina had been deposited there after her underwear had been removed and consequently was deposited by her attacker." (Note: Paragraph 13)

== Michael Shirley ==
Michael Shirley was an 18-year-old able seaman in the Royal Navy, serving aboard HMS Apollo, which was docked in Portsmouth at the time of the murder. On the night of the murder he had been to a nightclub, "Joanna's", in Southsea, Portsmouth, where he had met Deena Fogg, a local woman. When the club closed Fogg agreed to go to her home with him in a taxi. After a short journey of around 5 minutes, the taxi arrived at a residential tower block where Fogg said she needed to go to her mother's to collect her child, after which she would come back to the taxi. (Note: Paragraph 3) However, she had no intention of spending the night with Shirley and instead left the building by another exit and returned to her nearby home alone. After around 15 minutes Shirley realised he had been tricked, paid the taxi fare and set off on foot to see if he could find Fogg. At trial, the prosecution submitted that it was at this time that "he saw Miss Cook who was walking along Merry Row... and in his frustrated and angry state he attacked her, raped her and murdered her before going back to HMS Apollo."

Shirley stated that he had spent approximately 10 minutes looking for Fogg, then headed back to his ship. He said that he caught another taxi on Edinburgh Road at 01:23 which took him to the gates of the dock where he was booked-in back aboard ship at 01:45. Two days later he met Fogg again by chance, and during a brief conversation which Fogg later claimed she found "intimidating" the subject of the murder and their close proximity to the murder scene at the time was mentioned. (Note: Paragraph 39) He subsequently spent his Christmas shore leave at his parents' home in Leamington Spa, Warwickshire. In January 1987 he returned to Portsmouth and was due to sail to the Falkland Islands. On 5 January 1987, before the ship left the UK, he made another visit to "Joanna's" where Fogg – initially discovered as a witness during house-to-house inquiries – identified him to a police detective as the man she had been with on the night of the murder. He was arrested and taken into custody. Charged with Linda Cook's murder, he was remanded in custody at Winchester Prison the same month.

== Prosecution case ==
The prosecution case against Shirley consisted of four circumstantial "planks":

- Athletic shoe – The imprint of the athletic shoe found on Cook's body had been made by a size 43–45 right shoe, and had a distinctive tread pattern including the word "Flash" in the heel area. Shirley possessed a pair of size 44 athletic shoes with the same tread, and stated that he "may" have been wearing them on the night of the murder. At the time of his arrest they were at his parents' home, and were probably there when Linda was murdered. Between 1983 and 1986, 185,000 pairs were imported into the UK. In 1986 alone, up to 9,000 pairs of shoes with this tread were sold in the UK, of which 250 pairs had been sold in Portsmouth. Shirley stated that he had purchased them in Portsmouth around October 1986. No blood was found on Shirley's shoes when they were examined by forensic scientists. (Note: Paragraph 43)
- Blood type – The semen samples taken from Linda's body provided a match with Shirley's blood group, O positive, which is shared by 23.3% of the British adult male population. No blood matching Cook's was found on Shirley's clothing, and no matching fibres were found on Cook's or Shirley's clothing.
- Scratch marks – At the time of his arrest, Shirley was examined and found to have healed scratches on his right cheek, right eyebrow, collar bone, left shoulder, right elbow, right forearm, right index finger, left upper arm, and left elbow, which the prosecution's expert claimed were about four weeks old, within the time frame of the murder. For the defence, a consultant forensic physician testified that it was not possible to date the injuries with such accuracy, and Shirley stated that some of them had been received while he was serving in Barbados in October 1986. However, examination of Cook's body had also shown that her long fingernails were unbroken, suggesting that she did not scratch her attacker, and no trace evidence was found beneath the nails to link her with Shirley. (Note: Paragraph 19–22) The jury were not told this.
- "Missing half-hour" – The prosecution case also relied on a "missing" 30 minutes, the discrepancy between Fogg's testimony that she believed they had caught the taxi from "Joanna's" at just after midnight, and she had arrived home at about 00:15, and Shirley's account of the timings. Taking into account Shirley's description of his journey back to HMS Apollo, they maintained that he should have arrived at 01:15, not 01:45. If he had arrived back on board at 01:45 this, they submitted, would leave 30 minutes unaccounted for, sufficient time to have carried out the murder. (Note: Paragraph 28–38) However, Fogg had given two statements to the police and in the first had said she left the nightclub with Shirley at around 00:30, placing Shirley well away from the scene when Cook was killed and corroborating his account of the evening. The jury were not told about the first statement, and it emerged later that the second statement had been "made under some duress; she had been in the police station for 10 hours, was concerned for her baby and her mother was standing outside calling for her." The log book of the taxi driver who took them from the nightclub recorded that he had made a pre-booked pick up at 00:15 and did not arrive at the taxi rank where he collected Shirley and Fogg until 00.25. The log book was not produced at the trial.

Additionally, the Crown alleged:

- Alibi concoction – During the brief discussion at their second meeting, Fogg claimed that she got the impression that Shirley was attempting to reinforce his later evidence that they had left the nightclub very late, which the prosecution described as "the beginning of an attempt to concoct an alibi." When giving his statements to the police, he referred to Deena Fogg as "Sue", which she had, it later emerged, told him was her name. The prosecution claimed "that he was deliberately concealing his knowledge of the girl's identity in the hope that he would prevent the police from tracing her". This ignored the fact that he had nonetheless given "a full account to the police about his activities" with the girl. (Note: Paragraph 40) (Note: Paragraph 42)

== Trial ==
The trial began on 18 January 1988 at Winchester Crown Court before Mr Justice Hutchison. Shirley maintained his innocence throughout the trial, and as the case was based only on circumstantial evidence and the testimony of Deena Fogg, he and his legal team doubted that it would result in conviction. The prosecution produced no forensic evidence against Shirley. The jury believed the prosecution case, however, and on 28 January 1988 he was found guilty of the rape and murder of Linda Cook and sentenced to life imprisonment. The jury had retired at 10:08 "with strong hints that the judge wanted a verdict that day" and returned at 16:42 with an 11–1 verdict of guilty. An application for leave to appeal against the conviction was rejected on 4 May 1989. The judge who turned down the application, Sir David Croom-Johnson, maintained that there were "no lingering doubts" over the question of Shirley's guilt. (Note: Paragraph 5)

== Incarceration ==
Shirley was incarcerated at several prisons during his sentence:

- 1988–1990: HM Prison Aylesbury
- 1990–1996: HM Prison Long Lartin
- 1996–1997: HM Prison Whitemoor
- 1997–2002: HM Prison Gartree
- 2002–2003: HM Prison Wormwood Scrubs

== Campaign to prove innocence ==
Shirley protested his innocence, and in 1992 spent five weeks on hunger strike at HM Prison Long Lartin to draw public attention to his case. In September 1992 his solicitors sent the Home Office fresh evidence which they claimed pointed to his innocence. Frustrated that fresh evidence uncovered by a journalist was being ignored, Shirley also staged a rooftop protest – of which he later said "Those couple of days on the roof were my only nights out in 16 years." He only came down after prison authorities agreed to let in the journalist, Neil Humber, to talk to him. Humber was one of the earliest campaigners convinced of Shirley's innocence, and was the first to call attention to the differences between Fogg's two police statements, calling the time discrepancies "horrendous". On 28 January 1993 Shirley began another hunger strike and his mother told the news media that he would remain on hunger strike "until he gets something in black and white to show that there really is something happening. Hampshire are not going to own up to making a mistake. I would have preferred another force." The hunger strike lasted 42 days until the Home Office "agreed 'possibly' to review the case if they were given new evidence in a coherent form." Humber, who was due to attend a course, was told by his employers that he would be dismissed if he instead took the time off to write the report. He prepared a 49-page report which was passed to the authorities and was fired by his newspaper. With regard to the evidence, Hampshire Constabulary said "These matters have been passed to the Chief Constable of Hampshire and a further report will be submitted to the Home Office when these aspects have been inquired into." Shirley's solicitor, Pal Sanghera, said he was "disturbed that the same force that had carried out the initial investigation and a further inquiry last summer was being given the task."

Shirley's campaign suffered numerous setbacks in persuading the authorities to re-examine fresh evidence. In 1995 he again applied to the Home Office for a review of his conviction but was informed by the Home Secretary Michael Howard that he "was not minded to refer his case to the Court of Appeal."

Throughout, Shirley was held in Category A prisons – reserved only for prisoners "whose escape would be highly dangerous to the public, or the police or the security of the State, and for whom the aim must be to make escape impossible" – because the authorities considered him to be "in denial" over his guilt. Shirley's lawyer, Anita Bromley, said "He is not in denial, he denies committing the crime. What Michael's case shows is how easy it is to be convicted of murder, and how very difficult it is to overturn that conviction."

The campaign was hampered by Hampshire Constabulary's poor handling of evidence after the trial: advances in DNA profiling would have demonstrated Shirley's innocence, and he "consistently asked that DNA tests be carried out" but the police claimed that none of the evidence or swabs had been retained, and that much of it had been destroyed 6 months after the trial. (Note: Paragraph 7) Eventually, in 2001, the police admitted that they had found a slide taken from one of the swabs "in a drawer", and in 2002 found further clothing evidence. Speaking in June 2002, James Plaskitt, the then MP for Warwick and Leamington, said: "This long delay has imposed an intolerable strain on Michael and his family... The system failed in the original trial, and it has been decidedly sluggish in helping him clear his name."

== See also ==
- Murder of Teresa de Simone
- Murder of Lesley Molseed
- Murder of Wendy Sewell
- Innocent prisoner's dilemma
- List of wrongful convictions in the United States

Other UK cold cases where the offender's DNA is known:

- Murders of Jacqueline Ansell-Lamb and Barbara Mayo
- Murder of Janet Brown
- Murder of Lyn Bryant
- Murder of Melanie Hall
- Murder of Deborah Linsley
- Murders of Eve Stratford and Lynne Weedon
- Murder of Lindsay Rimer
- Batman rapist, subject to Britain's longest-running serial rape investigation

== Notes ==
=== Appeal notes ===
"R v Michael Shirley". EWCA Crim 1976. 2003. Archived from the original on 2 July 2007.
