= HM Prison Deerbolt =

Young offenders prison in County Durham, England

Coordinates: 54.542626°N 1.938142°W

HMP/YOI Deerbolt
- Interactive map of HMP/YOI Deerbolt
- Location: Barnard Castle, County Durham
- Security class: Young Offenders
- Capacity: 513
- Population: 421 (January 2025)
- Opened: 1973
- Managed by: HM Prison Services
- Governor: Melanie Stobbart
- Website: Deerbolt at justice.gov.uk

HM Prison Deerbolt is a male Category C Training Prison in Barnard Castle, County Durham, England. The prison is operated by His Majesty's Prison Service.

== History ==
Deerbolt prison opened in 1973, on the site of a former army camp.

In 1999 four inmates escaped from Deerbolt while with an outside working party. A year later a report from His Majesty's Chief Inspector of Prisons stated that Deerbolt was dangerously overcrowded, with too many inmates and too few resources.

There was a major disturbance at the prison in February 2005 involving six inmates who caused tens of thousands of pounds' worth of damage to the prison chapel. There was another large disturbance at the prison the following June.

Deerbolt Prison was praised by inspectors in 2005 for improving activity and resettlement services but was criticised for inmates spending too much time in their cells.

In 2007 prison officers passed a vote of no confidence in the then governor Deborah Baldwin after D wing and F wing at Deerbolt Prison were taken over by inmates in a five-hour riot. Four prison officers were injured at the premises during the disturbance.

His Majesty's Inspectorate of Prisons assessment of the prison in June 2011 was that it was fundamentally safe, but work was required to reduce levels of violence and improve discipline. It was noted that the prison had a "challenging population", but staff had worked hard to make improvements since 2007.

The prison was inspected again in 2015. It was described as "a decent and generally safe prison" although some aspects of teaching provision were said to require urgent attention.

On 8 January 2020 four prison officers were hurt when it was reported that the prison authorities had lost control of a wing. An external team of prison officers specifically trained to quell riots, designated as a “tornado team”, were called to regain control. The troubles were contained in the early hours of 9 January and the offending prisoners were moved elsewhere.

== Present day ==
Deerbolt is a Category C Training Prison and caters for approximately 500 prisoners with no age limit, generally serving sentences up to four years in length from the north-east of England and Humberside area.

The education department at the prison is run by Novus, a subsidiary of The Manchester College, and offers both full- and part-time classes in a variety of subjects. Courses include music, art, drama, creative writing, geography, history, maths and information technology. Workshop jobs are available to prisoners who have first completed a qualification in basic literacy or numeracy, completed a manual handling course and have done a first aid qualification. Courses include catering, office skills, building computers, bricklaying, plastering, charity workshop, furniture craft, multiskills, painting and decorating, motor mechanics and fork-lift truck driving.

Deerbolt prison's gym also offers physical education qualifications, as well as being available for recreational use. Other facilities and services at the prison include a library and a prison chaplaincy.
