= Francis Grant (marine) =

British Royal Marine (1924–2026)

Francis 'Jim' Grant (20 December 1924 – 2 January 2026) was a British Royal Marine and World War II veteran.

== Biography ==
Grant was born 20 December 1924 in Stowmarket, Suffolk. He signed up for the Royal Marines at the age of 18, fighting in 1944, at the Battle of the Scheldt. He later participated during the Normandy landings, operating anti-aircraft weapons at Sword Beach.

In 2024, The Royal Navy and a representative of King Charles III celebrated his 100th anniversary.

Grant died on 2 January 2026, aged 101.
