= 62–70 Victoria Street =

Hotel in Devon, England, demolished 2026

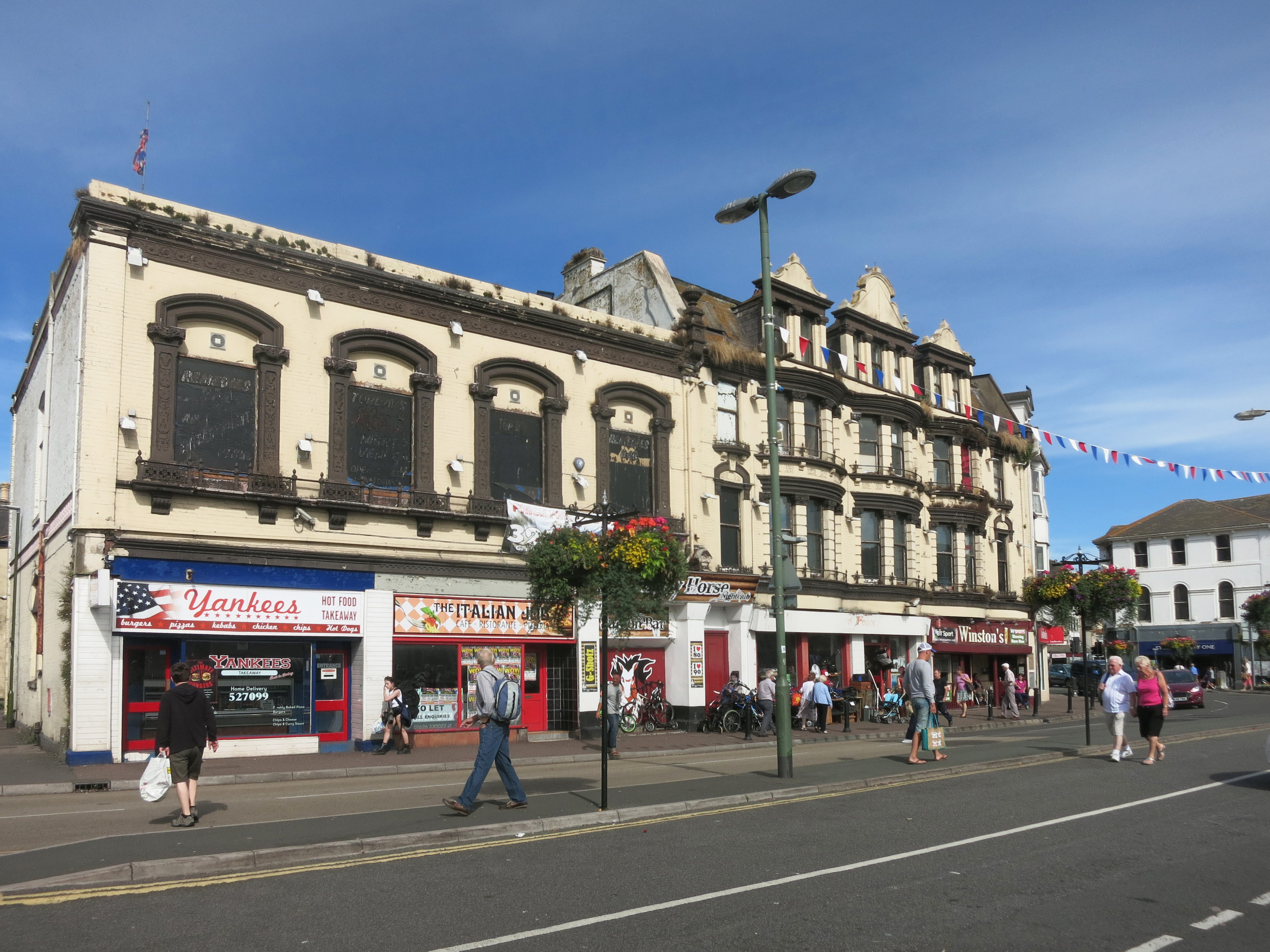
- The building in 2016
- Interactive map of the 62–70 Victoria Street area

General information
- Status: Demolished
- Architectural style: Victorian
- Location: Paignton, Devon, England
- Coordinates: 50.435165°N 3.565031°W
- Year built: 1894
- Demolished: July 2026

Technical details
- Floor count: 4

Design and construction
- Architects: Couldrey and Bridgman

62–70 Victoria Street was a historic building in Paignton, a seaside town in Devon, England. It was described as "one of the town's most imposing and prominent Victorian premises".

== History ==
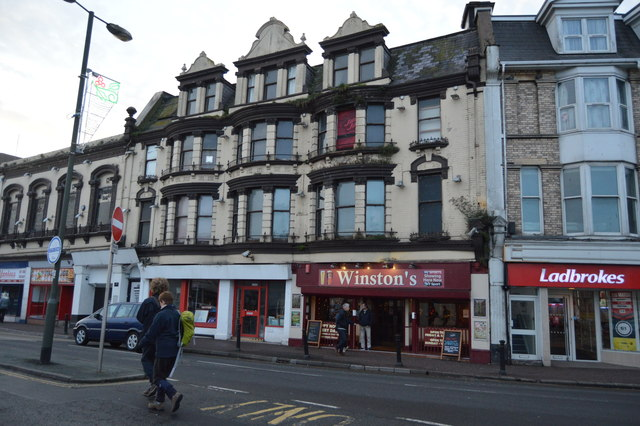
The building in 2017

The terraced building opposite Paignton railway station was built in 1894 and designed by local architects Couldrey and Bridgman. It was formerly the Bailey's Hotel, which served passengers from the railway. The buildings on Victoria Street were named as part of a town centre redevelopment project.

In March 2025, plans for the building's demolition were submitted. In May 2026, Torbay Council invoked emergency public safety powers to close the road, after parts of the façade collapsed onto the pavement below. On 1 July 2026, the council approved its demolition. The demolition is scheduled to take place in July.
