= Portsmouth Courts of Justice =

Judicial building in Portsmouth, England

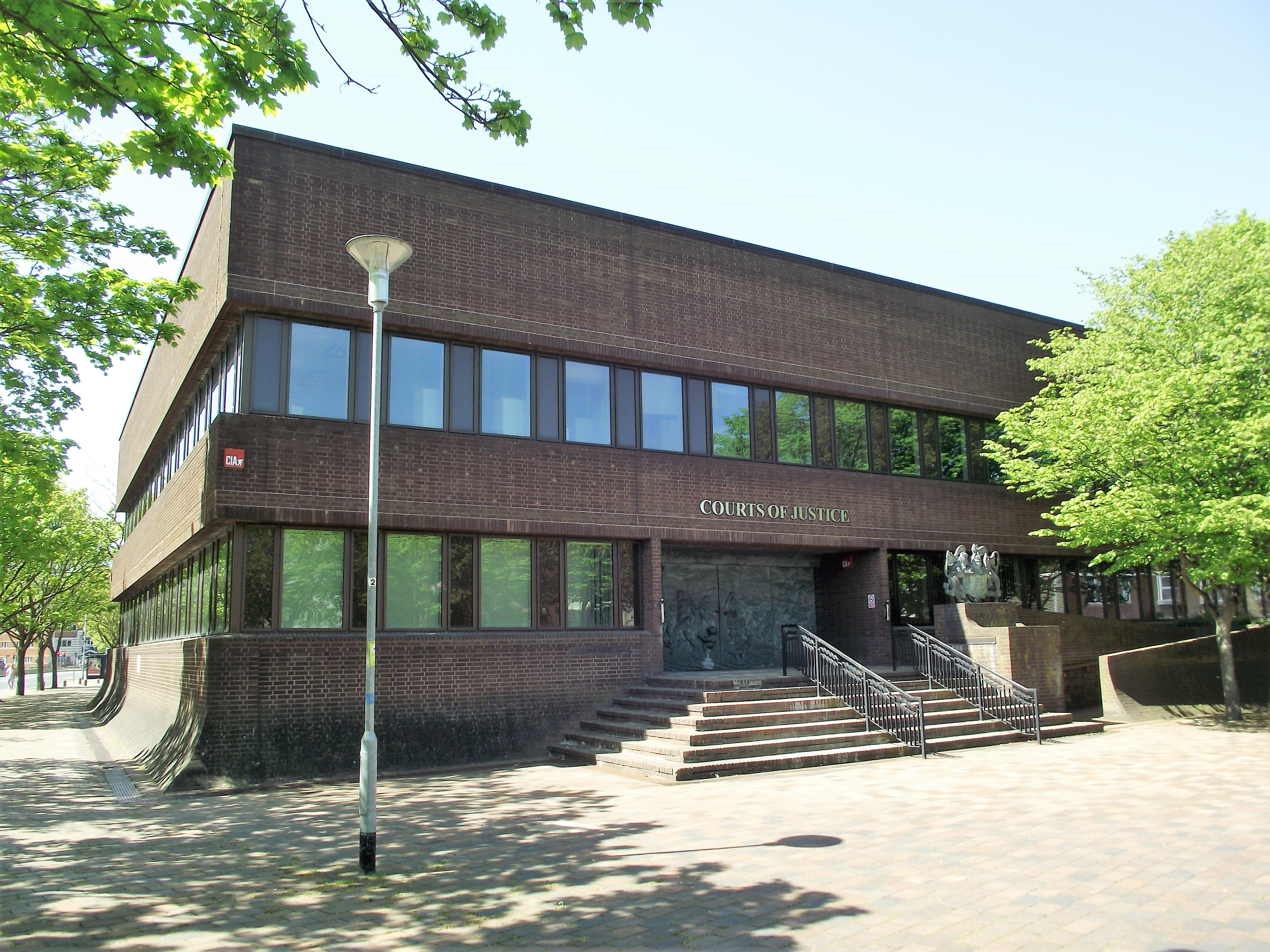
- Portsmouth Courts of Justice

- Shown in Hampshire
- 50.7955°N 1.0906°W
- Location: Winston Churchill Avenue, Portsmouth

History
- Built: 1982

Site notes
- Architect: Property Services Agency
- Architectural style: Modernist style

Portsmouth Courts of Justice is a Crown Court venue, which deals with criminal cases, and a County Court venue, which deals with civil cases, in Winston Churchill Avenue, Portsmouth, England.

== History ==
Until the early 1960s, criminal court hearings in Portsmouth were held in the courtroom in Portsmouth Guildhall. This was temporarily resolved when a new law courts building (now referred to as Portsmouth Magistrates' Court) was opened on the east side of a small courtyard off Winston Churchill Avenue in July 1960. However, as the number of court cases in Portsmouth grew, it became necessary to commission a courthouse with dedicated facilities for both Crown Court hearings, which require courtrooms suitable for trial by jury, and for County Court hearings. The site selected by the Lord Chancellor's Department, on the west side of the courtyard, had accommodated a series of rows of terraced housing (Swan Street, Russell Street and Upper Swan Street) which had been destroyed by German bombing during the Second World War.

The new building was designed by the Property Services Agency in the Modernist style, built in red brick at a cost of £7 million, and was opened in 1982. The design involved an asymmetrical main frontage facing east onto a small courtyard. It featured a small flight of steps, to the left of centre, leading up to an opening containing three doorways. The building was fenestrated by a rows of casement windows on two floors with brickwork above and below. A Royal coat of arms, formed from cast iron, was mounted on a brick pedestal just to the right of the steps. Internally, the building was laid out to accommodate nine courtrooms.

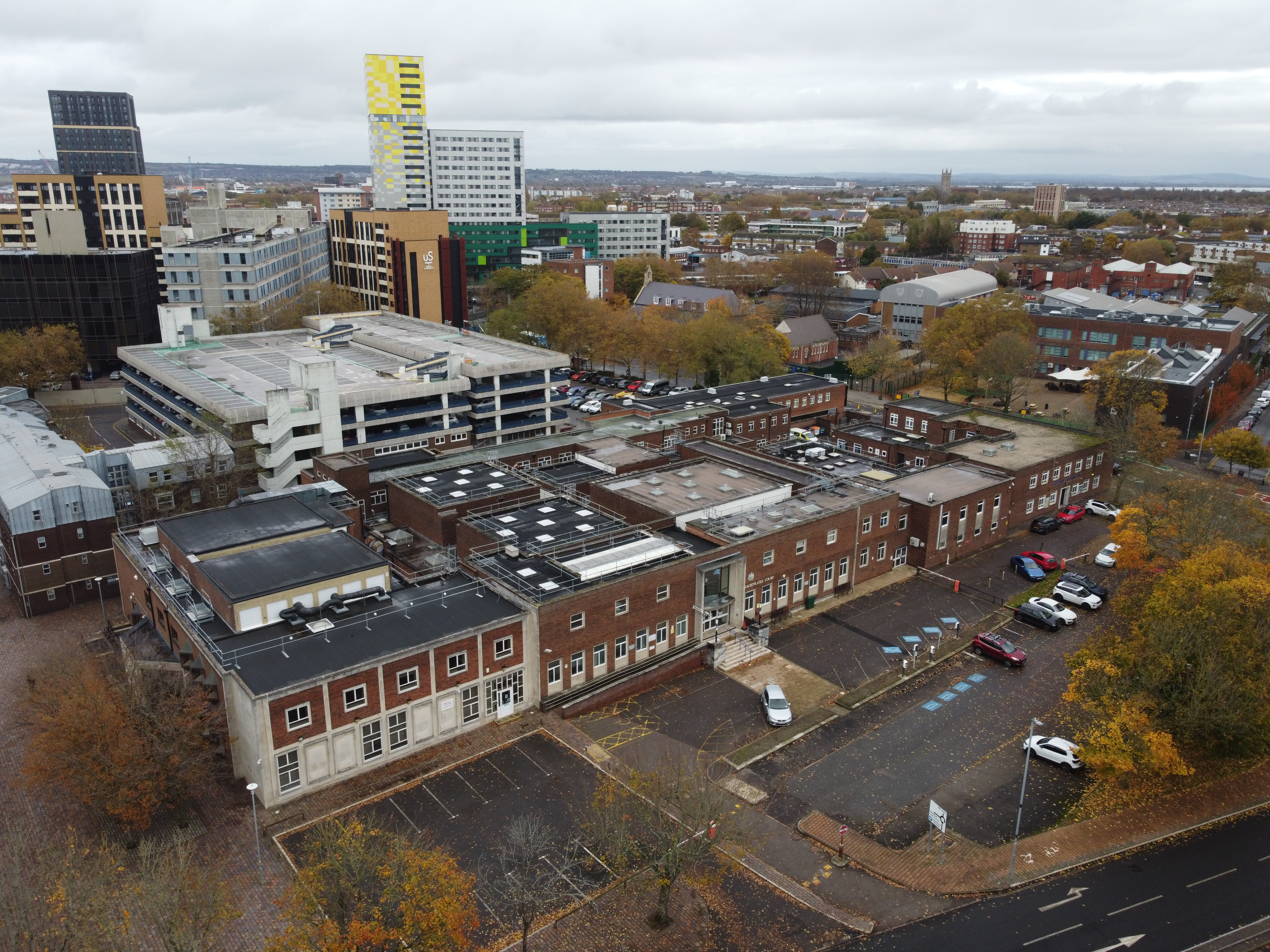
Portsmouth Magistrates Court, Hampshire Constabulary

Notable cases include the trial and conviction of David Lace, in June 1984, for robbery at a post office; in September 2009, some 21 years after his death, he was named by police as the murderer of Teresa De Simone. Notable cases also included the trial and conviction of Mark Brandford, in February 2021, for the murder of his girlfriend, Kayleigh Dunning.
