= Johnsons of Old Hurst =

Zoo and farm in England

Coordinates: 52.378088°N 0.09068°W

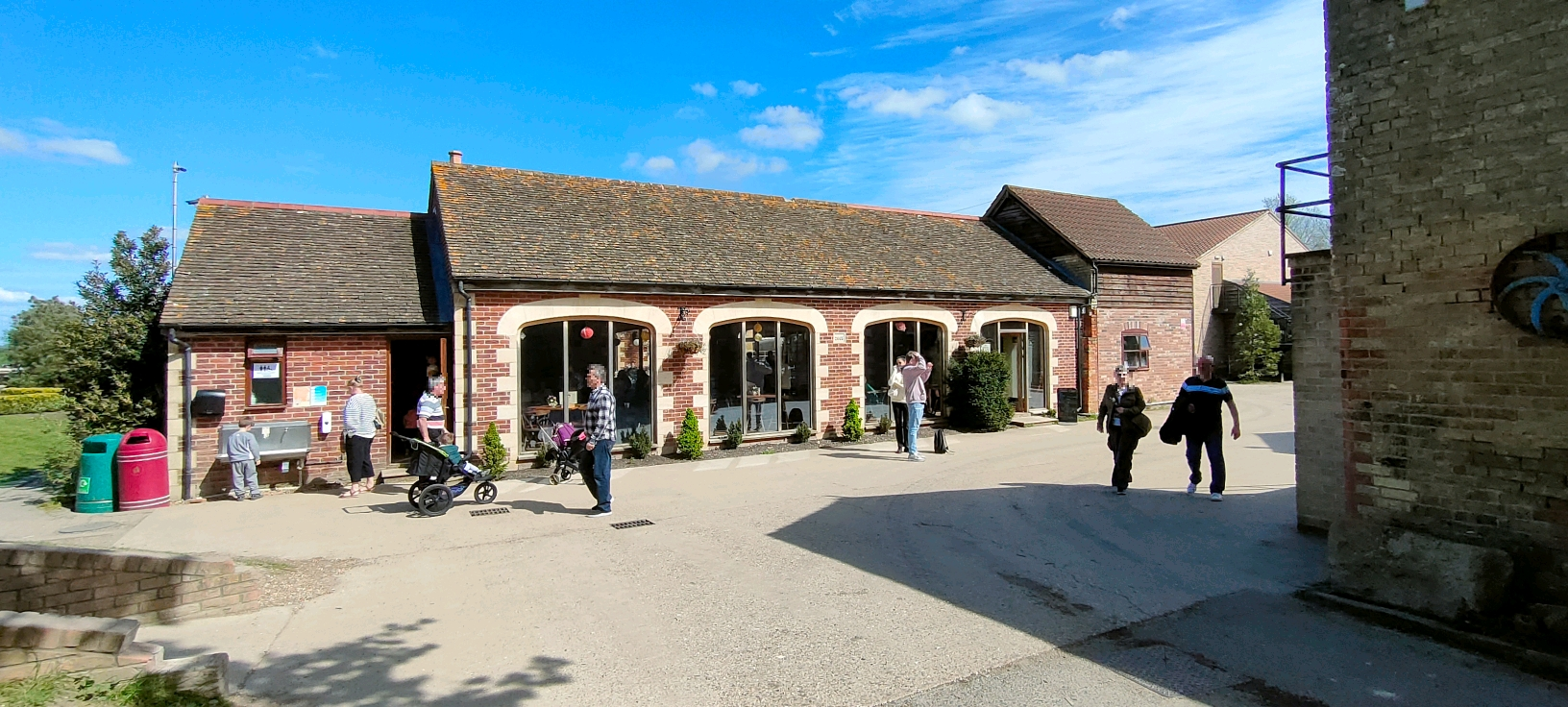
- Johnsons of Old Hurst café in 2024
- Interactive map of Johnsons of Old Hurst
- Location: Church Street, Old Hurst
- Owner: Johnson family
- Website: Official website

Johnsons of Old Hurst is a zoo and farm shop in Old Hurst, Cambridgeshire, UK (historic county of Huntingdonshire).

== History ==
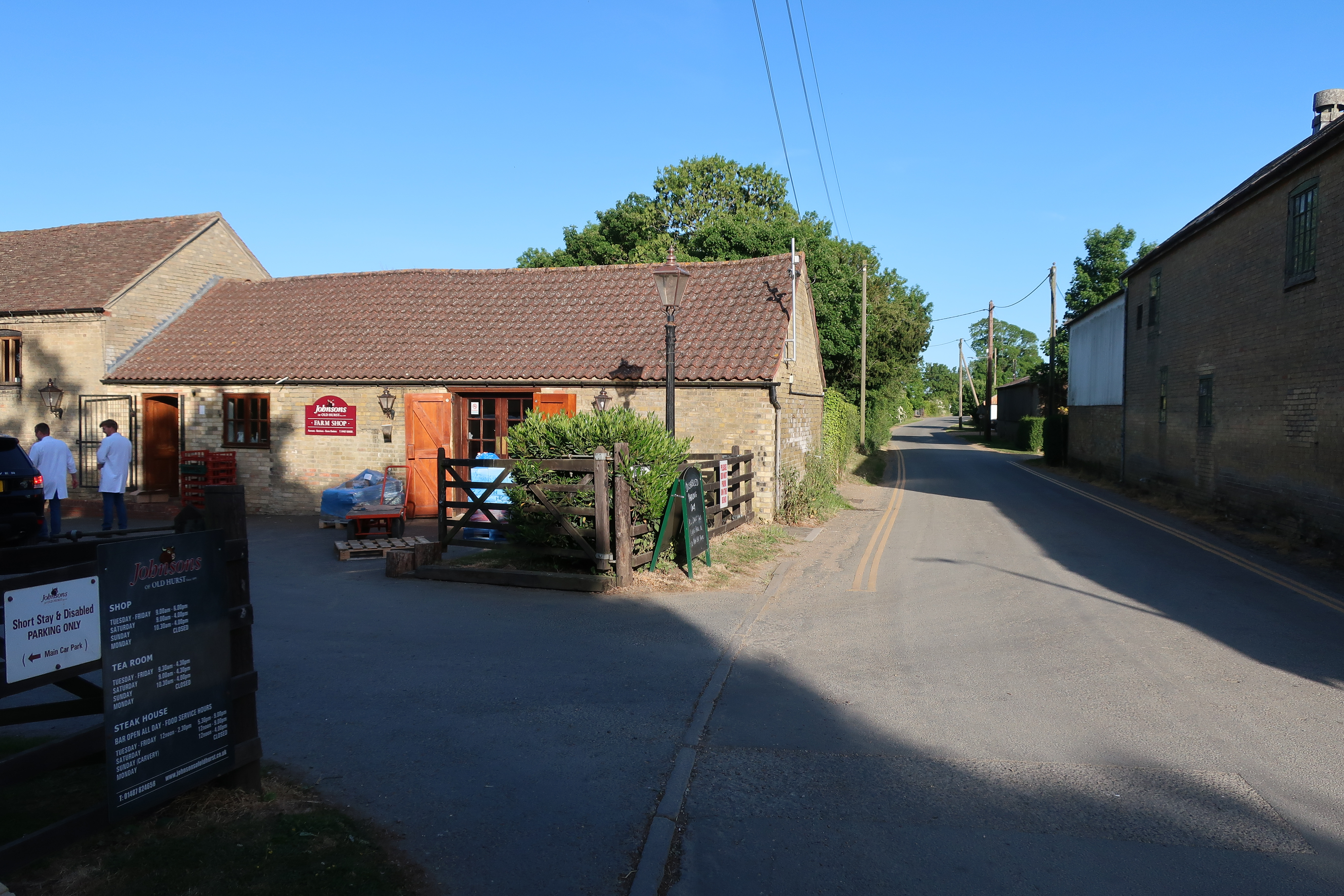
Entrance and farm shop in 2020

It began operating as a family farm before becoming a zoo and tourist attraction. As of 2025 it was owned by the fourth generation of the Johnson family.

In 2026, a child was injured at the zoo after allegedly being thrown into the crocodile enclosure; a man was arrested by Cambridgeshire Constabulary on suspicion of attempted murder. On 1 July 2026, the family released a statement thanking zoo staff for rescuing the injured 3-year-old child.
