= Clark (given name) =

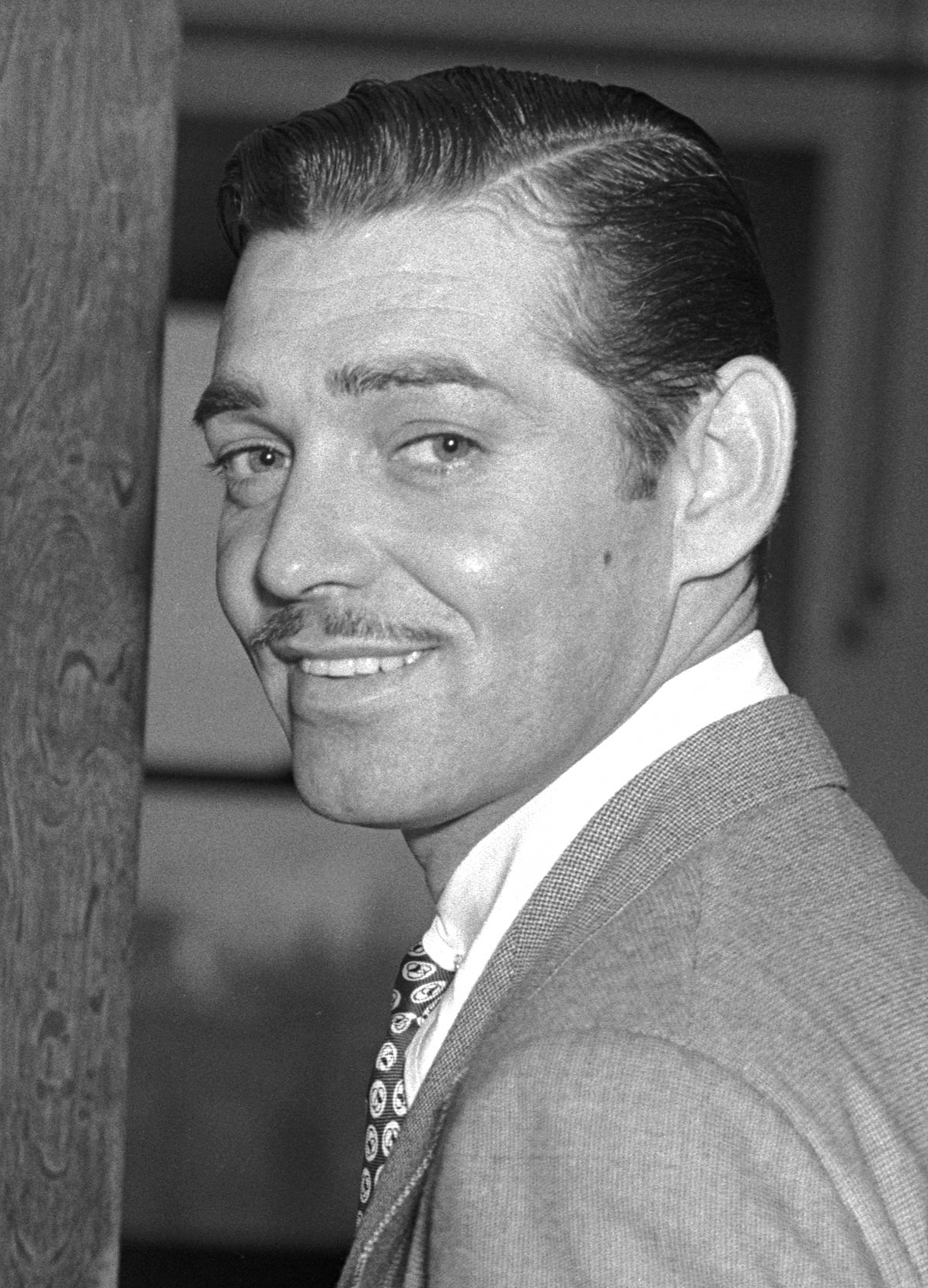
- Actor Clark Gable in 1937.
- Gender: Primarily masculine
- Language: English via Latin

Origin
- Meaning: clerk

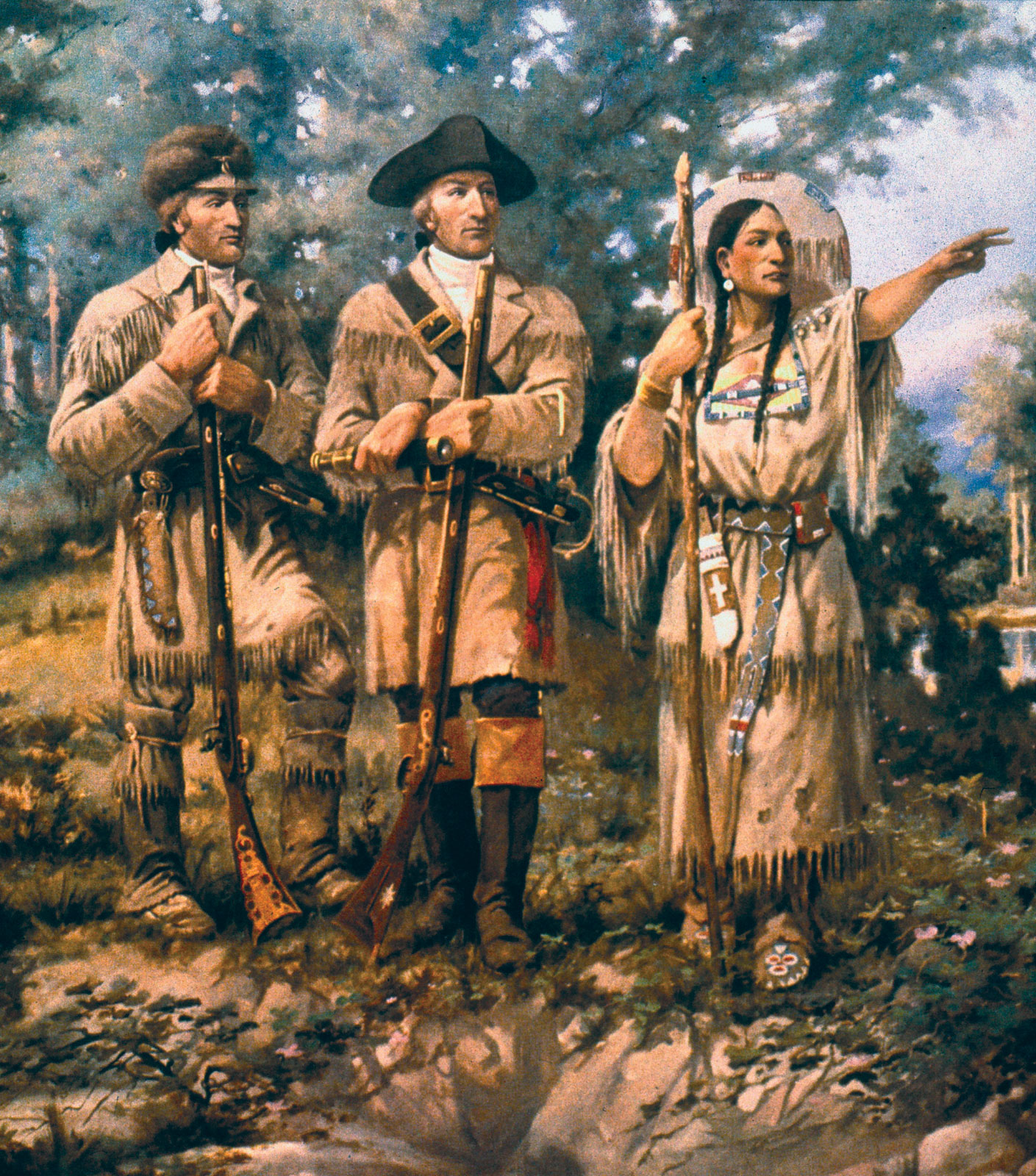
William Clark, Meriwether Lewis, and Sacagawea at Three Forks, Montana, a detail of a mural by Edgar Samuel Paxson in the lobby of the Montana State Capitol.

Clark or Clarke is a given name, a transferred use of the English occupational surname derived from the Latin word clericus, meaning clerk. The name has been in use as a given name in the Anglosphere since the 1600s.

== Usage ==
Usage of the name as a given name for boys in the 17th century and 18th century in North America was inspired by well-known figures such as George Rogers Clark (1752–1818), a United States Revolutionary War general, and his brother William Clark (1770–1838), who co-led the Lewis and Clark Expedition. James Beauchamp "Champ" Clark (1850–1921), a failed candidate for the 1912 Democrat presidential nomination, was an influence behind increased use of the name in the United States between 1911 and 1912. The fame of the actor Clark Gable (1901–1960) inspired additional namesakes in the 1930s. The name was at the height of its usage for American boys in 1938, coinciding with Gable's popularity. Clark Kent, the fictional alter ego of Superman, was named after Gable in 1938. The name increased in usage for American boys after Clark Kent appeared as a character in the television series Smallville, which premiered in 2001. The name Clarke, derived as a transferred use of the related surname Clarke, has also increased in usage for American girls in recent years, influenced by Clarke Betancourt, a character in the 1990 film Mo' Better Blues, and later by Clarke Griffin, a character on the television series The 100, which premiered in 2014.

== People ==
- Clark (born 1979), British electronic musician
- Clark C. Abt (born 1929), American educationist and researcher
- Clark Accord (1961–2011), Surinamese–Dutch author and makeup artist
- Clark Adams (1969–2007), American author
- Clark J. Adams (1904–1981), American lawyer, politician and judge
- Clark Aldrich (born 1967), American author and practitioner
- Clark Allen (1925–2008), American folk musician
- Clark L. Anderson, American academic
- Clark Moulton Avery (1819–1864), American Confederate Army officer and colonel
- Clark Backo (born 1993), Canadian actress
- Clark Baechle (born 1981), American drummer
- Clark Barnes (born 2000), Canadian gridiron football player
- Clark Barnes (born 1950), American politician
- Clark Barwick (born 1980), American mathematician
- Clark Beckham (born 1992), American singer, songwriter and musician
- Clark Bentom (c. 1774 – c. 1820), English missionary and surgeon
- Clark Blaise (born 1940), Canadian-American writer
- Clark M. Blatteis (1932–2021), German-American professor
- Clark Boler (1942–2013), American football and baseball coach
- Clark Boyd, American radio journalist
- Clark Boyd (born 1978), American politician
- Clark L. Bradley (1908–1983), American politician
- Clark Brandon (born 1958), American actor
- Clark Brisson (born 1969), American soccer player
- Clark E. Bronson (born 1939), American sculptor
- Clark L. Brundin (1931–2021), British academic administrator
- Clark W. Bryan (1824–1899), American publisher, writer, poet, and journalist
- Clark Burckle (born 1988), American swimmer
- Clark Burdick (1868–1948), American politician
- Clark Burnham (1802–1871), American politician
- Clark Butler (born 1944), American professor of philosophy
- Clark Byers (1915–2004), American artist
- Clark Carter (born 1984), Australian explorer and filmmaker
- Clark Clifford (1906–1998), American public official
- Clark B. Cochrane (1815–1867), American politician
- Clark Datchler (born 1964), English singer
- Clark Davis (born 1957), Canadian wrestler
- Clark Janell Davis, American beauty pageant titleholder
- Clark Dean (born 2000), American rower
- Clark Denmark, British activist, lecturer, and interpreter
- Clark Dennis (born 1966), American golfer
- Clark B. Dibble (1860–1932), American politician
- Clark Donatelli (born 1965), American ice hockey player and coach
- Clark Donnelly, Canadian producer
- Clark Duke (born 1985), American actor
- Clark Durant (born 1949), American businessman
- Clark Dwyer (born 1964), American racing driver
- Clark Eichelberger (1896–1980), American peace activist
- Clark Ervin (born 1959), American government official
- Clark G. Fiester (1934–1995), American businessman who served as Assistant Secretary of the Air Force
- Clark V. Fox (born 1946), American painter
- Clark Gable (1901–1960), American film actor
- Clark James Gable (1988–2019), American actor, model, and television presenter
- Clark Gaines (born 1954), American football player and coach
- Clark Hewett Galloway (1898–1961), American editor, Latin American affairs expert, and army colonel
- Clark Gayton, American musician and composer
- Clark Gesner (1938–2002), American composer, songwriter, author, and actor
- Clark Gibson, American political scientist
- Clark G. Gilbert (born 1970), American religious leader, member of the Quorum of the Twelve Apostles of The Church of Jesus Christ of Latter Day Saints
- Clark Gillies (1954–2022), Canadian ice hockey player
- Clark Glymour (born 1942), American philosopher
- Clark Goff (1917–1998), American football player
- Clark Gracie (born 1984), American-Brazilian jiu-jitsu competitor and member of the Gracie family
- Clark Graebner (born 1943), American tennis player
- Clark Gregg (born 1962), American actor, director, and screenwriter
- Clark Griffith (1869–1955), American baseball player, manager, and owner
- Clark Robinson Griggs (1824–1915), American politician
- Clark Gruening (1943–2025), American attorney and politician
- Clark Haas (1919–1978), American cartoonist and previous owner of Cambria Studios
- Clark Haggans (1977–2023), American football player
- Clark Hall, American politician
- Clark Hallren, American businessman
- Clark Hamilton (1955–2022), Canadian ice hockey player
- Clark Harris (born 1984), American football player
- Clark Hatch, American businessman, author, missionary, and fitness enthusiast
- Clark Havighurst (born 1933), American legal scholar
- Clark Heinrich (born 1945), American author
- Clark T. Hinman (1819–1854), American college president
- Clark S. Hobbs (1888–1973), American reporter, columnist, and editor
- Clark Hodder (1903–1968), American athlete, coach, and administrator
- Clark L. Hood (1847–1920), American politician
- Clark Hopkins (1895–1976), American archaeologist
- Clark Howard (born 1955), American radio host, consumer advocate, author
- Clark Howat (1918–2009), American actor
- Clark Howell (1863–1936), American politician and publisher
- Clark Hoyt, American journalist
- Clark Hubbs (1921–2008), American ichthyologist
- Clark Hulings (1922–2011), American painter
- Clark L. Hull (1884–1952), American psychologist
- Clark Hunt (born 1965), American football executive
- Clark Irving (1808–1865), Australian merchant pastoralist and politician
- Clark Jarnagin (1914–1979), American football and basketball coach
- Clark Jenkins (born 1948), American politician
- Clark Jilson (1825–1894), American politician
- Clark Johnson (born 1954), American actor and director
- Clark Johnson (born 1952), American politician
- Clark Jolley (born 1970), American politician
- Clark Jones (1920–2002), American television director
- Clark Kauffman, American politician
- Clark Keating (born 1976), Australian rules footballer
- Clark Kellogg (born 1961) American basketball player, analyst, and broadcaster
- Clark Keltie (born 1983), English footballer
- Clark Kerr (1911–2003), American economist and academic
- Clark Kimberling (born 1942), American mathematician
- Clark King (born 1949), American speed skater
- Clark Kinsey (1877–1956), American photographer
- Clark G. Kuebler (1908–1974), American professor and educator
- Clark Kuppinger (1918–1963), American politician
- Clark Laidlaw (born 1977), Scottish rugby union coach and player
- Clark R. Landis (born 1956), American chemist
- Clark Spencer Larsen (born 1952), American biological anthropologist
- Clark Lea (born 1981), American football player and coach
- Clark Leiblee (1876–1917), American track athlete
- Clark W. LeMasters Jr., United States Army general
- Clark Lowenfield (born 1957), American Anglican bishop
- Clark MacGregor (1922–2003), American politician
- Clark Manning (born 1959), American actuary and business manager
- Clark Martell (born 1959), American white supremacist and neo-Nazi
- Clark Masters (born 1987), English footballer
- Clark Mathis, American film director
- Clark Maxwell Jr. (1934–2011), American politician
- Clark W. May (1869–1908), American politician
- Clark McCauley (born 1943), American social psychologist
- Clark McConachy (1895–1980), New Zealand player of English billiards and snooker
- Clark McDougall (1921–1980), Canadian artist
- Clark W. McDonnell (1870–1952), American politician
- Clark W. Metzger (1868–1946), American politician
- Clark Middleton (1957–2020), American actor
- Clark Miller (1938–2008), American football player
- Clark Blanchard Millikan (1903–1966), American academic and aerospace engineer
- Clark Mills (1815–1883), American sculptor
- Clark Mills (1915–2001), American boat designer and builder
- Clark R. Mollenhoff (1921–1991), American journalist, author, and Presidential Counsel
- Clark Moore (born 1991), American actor and writer
- Clark Moustakas (1923–2012), American psychologist
- Clark A. Murdock (born 1940s), American senior adviser at Center for Strategic and International Studies
- Clark Murray (1937–2022), American sculptor
- Clark Murray (1900–1983), Canadian politician
- Clark Olofsson (born 1947), Swedish criminal
- Clark M. Perry (1872–1936), American politician and businessman
- Clark Peterson (born 1966), American film producer and entertainment executive
- Clark A. Peterson, American game designer and judge
- Clark Phillips III (born 2001), American football player
- Clark Pinnock (1937–2010), Canadian theologian
- Clark Polak (1937–1980), American journalist
- Clark V. Poling (1910–1943), American army chaplain
- Clark Randt (born 1945), American lawyer and diplomat
- Clark R. Rasmussen (1934–2024), American politician
- Clark L. Reber (1937–2025), American politician
- Clark G. Reynolds (1939–2005), American historian
- Clark Richert (1941–2021), American artist
- Clark Robertson (born 1993), Scottish footballer
- Clark Thomas Rogerson (1918–2001), American mycologist
- Clark Ross, Canadian composer, guitarist, and music educator
- Clark L. Ruffner (1903–1982), American army general
- Clark Sampson, American curler
- Clark Saturn (born 1969), American musician, DJ, actor, filmmaker, and comedian
- Clark Scarff (born 1948), Australian cricketer
- Clark Schrontz, American football player
- Clark Shaughnessy (1892–1970), American football player and coach
- Clark Shultz (born 1957), American politician
- Clark Smith (disambiguation), various people
- Clark Sorley (born 1956), Scottish record producer
- Clark Spencer (born 1963), American producer of Walt Disney Animation Studios
- Clark Stacey (born 1980), American businessman
- Clark Stanford, American dentist
- Clark Stanley (born c. 1854), American herbalist and quack doctor
- Clark Daniel Stearns (1870–1944), Naval governor of American Samoa
- Clark Stith (born 1961), American politician
- Clark Strand (born 1957), American spiritual writer
- Clark Terry (1920–2015), American swing and bebop trumpeter
- Clark W. Thompson (1896–1981), American politician and United States Marine Corps veteran
- Clark W. Thompson (1825–1885), American politician
- Clark Tibbitts (1903–1985), American gerontologist
- Clark Tippet (1954–1994), American choreographer
- Clark Tracey (born 1961), British drummer, band leader, and composer
- Clark Van Galder (1909–1965), American sportsman and coach
- Clark Voorhees (1871–1933), American painter
- Clark Waddoups (born 1946), American judge
- Clark Warburton (1896–1979), American economist
- Clark Weber (born 1930), American radio personality
- Clark Henry Wells (1822–1888), American career officer and Navy rear admiral
- Clark C. Wemple (1927–1993), American politician
- Clark R. Wever (1835–1874), American Union Army officer
- Clark Williams (1870–1946), American banker and politician
- Clark L. Wilson (1913–2006), American industrial psychologist
- Clark Wissler (1870–1947), American anthropologist
- Clark H. Woodward (1877–1967), American Navy admiral
- Clark Yeager (born c. 1949), American swimming coach

=== In fiction ===
- Clark, a fictional character in the American film, Backrooms
- Clark Edison, recurring fictional character in the American television series, Bones
- Clark "Doc" Savage Jr, better known as Doc Savage, a fictional pulp hero from the 1930s.
- Clark Green, fictional character in the American television series, The Office
- Clark Griswold, fictional character in the film series National Lampoon's Vacation
- Clark Hudson, fiction character from the slasher television series, Scream
- Clark Kent, secret identity of Superman
  - Clark Kent (Smallville), fictional character in the television series, Smallville
- Clark Oppenheimer "The Caped Wonder," a fictional character found in all four versions of The Tick
- Clark Reedy, fictional character in the movie, The Benchwarmers
- Clark Still, a character in the Japanese video game, Ikari Warriors
