= Scarff =

Scarff is a surname. Notable people with the surname include:

- Clark Scarff (born 1948), Australian cricketer
- Harry Scarff (born 1993), English professional boxer
- Lynn Scarff, Irish science communicator and Director of the National Museum of Ireland
- J. C. Scarff, American football coach
- Peter Scarff (1908–1933) Scottish footballer
- R. Wilson Scarff (1926–2009), American politician
- Robert Wilfred Scarff (1899-1970) British pathologists
- Ward Scarff (born 1957), Australian cricketer
- William Scarff, pen-name of Algis Budrys (1931–2008), Lithuanian-American science fiction author
