= Hay fever (disambiguation) =

Hay fever is an inflammatory reaction to allergens in the air.

Hay fever or hayfever may also refer to:

- "Hayfever" (song), 1993 song by Trashcan Sinatras
- Hayfever (film), 2010 romantic comedy
- Hay Fever (play), 1924 comic play by Noël Coward
- "Hay Fever" (The Green Green Grass), a 2005 television episode

== See also ==
- Hay fever weed
