= Rudolf Bikkers =

Dutch Canadian printmaker (born 1943

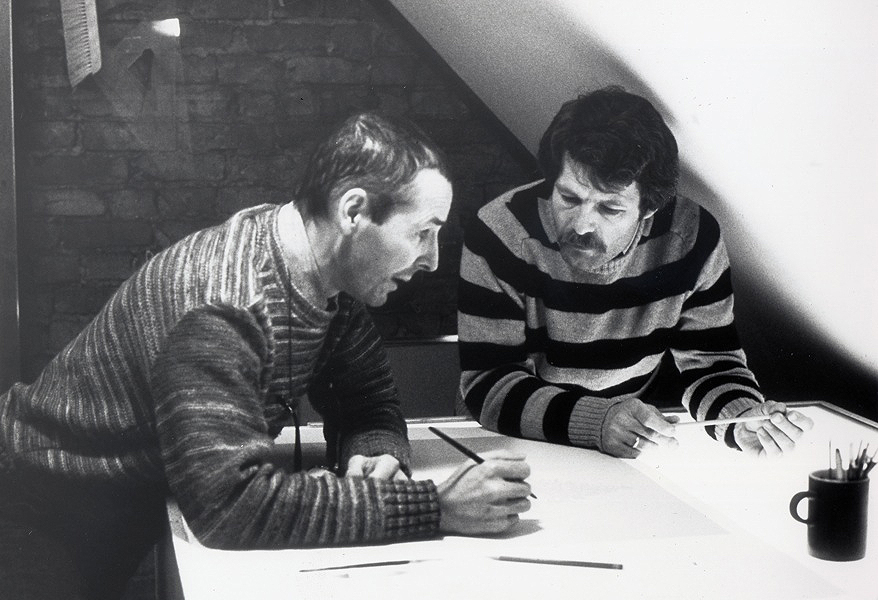
- Jack Chambers with Bikkers in the studios of Editions Canada London, Ontario, Canada 1978
- Born: April 5, 1943; Hilversum, Netherlands
- Died: February 6, 2023 (aged 79)
- Education: Jan Van Eyck Academie in Maastricht (1960-1966)
- Occupations: Painter, printmaker, educator

Rudolf Bikkers, RCA (April 5, 1943, in Hilversum, Netherlands – February 6, 2023) was a Canadian painter, printmaker, educator and entrepreneur. Bikkers had 23 solo shows and participated in 20 group shows in Canada, the United States, Europe, South Africa, China, Japan and Russia.

== Career ==
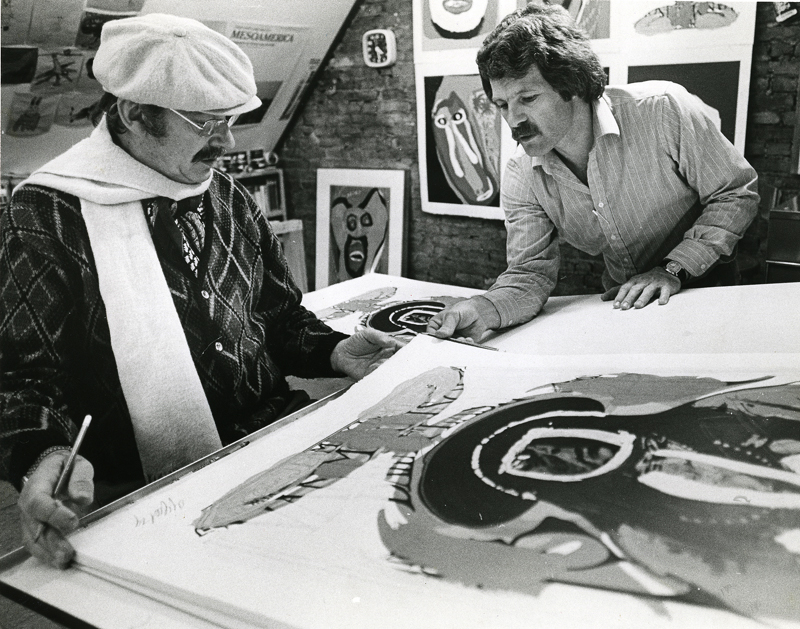
Rudolf Bikkers and Karel Appel in the studios of Editions Canada, London, Ontario, Canada 1979

In 1960 at the age of 17, he was the youngest student to be admitted to the Jan Van Eyck Academie in Maastricht on a six-year scholarship and graduated with honours in 1966. He studied the cello with Bob Reuling for two years, followed by four years with Chrétien Bonfrère at the Conservatorium of Maastricht. In the summer of 1966 he emigrated to Canada.

From 1967 to 1969, he taught drawing at H.B. Beal Secondary School in London, Ontario. From 1969 to 1976, he was Chair of the Printmaking Department at Fanshawe College in London, Ontario. In 1975, he established the Master Print Studio “Editions Canada Inc.”, custom printing and publishing many Canadian and international artists, among them Greg Curnoe, Jack Chambers, Ed Bartram, Clark McDougall, Walter Redinger, Claude Breeze, Karel Appel and Paul Jenkins. In 1983, he became the Chair of Printmaking at OCA, (now OCAD University) in Toronto where he taught until July 1, 2012.

== Recognition ==
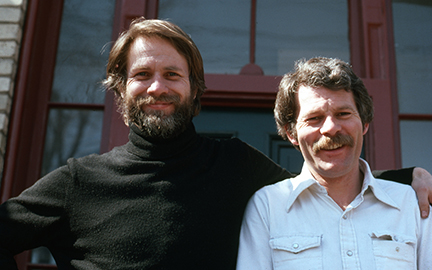
Rudolf Bikkers with Canadian painter Greg Curnoe.

During his career Bikkers has received several awards and honourable mentions, including the A.J. Casson Award. He was elected member of the Royal Canadian Academy of Arts in 2000 and received the Queen’s Golden Jubilee Medal in 2002.

His work is part of many public collections at the Art Gallery of Windsor, Art Gallery of Hamilton, and elsewhere.

Among his fundraising initiatives was in 2000 the AIDS (Artists International Direct Support) Portfolio for Sub-Saharan children affected by HIV/AIDS and in 2002 the RCA/EPSON Painters Portfolio.

Rudolf Bikkers and his wife Thera had a son and a daughter, all living in Toronto.

== Death ==
Bikkers died on February 6, 2023, after undergoing a medically assisted death, following Parkinson's disease.
