= Only Tongue Can Tell =

Single by The Trash Can Sinatras

from the album Cake
- B-side: "Useless"
- Released: 16 April 1990
- Length: 3:45
- Label: Go! Discs
- Songwriter(s): Frank Reader; Paul Livingston; John Douglas; George McDaid; Stephen Douglas
- Producer(s): The Trash Can Sinatras

The Trash Can Sinatras singles chronology
"Obscurity Knocks" (1990)	"Only Tongue Can Tell" (1990)	"Circling the Circumference" (1990)

"Only Tongue Can Tell" is a song by Scottish band The Trash Can Sinatras, which was released in 1990 as the second single from their debut studio album Cake. The song was written and produced by all five band members. "Only Tongue Can Tell" reached No. 77 in the UK Singles Chart and No. 8 in the Billboard Modern Rock Tracks chart.

== Music video ==
The song's music video was directed by Mike Bell and produced by Grace Wells. It achieved breakout rotation on MTV.

== Critical reception ==
On its release, Penny Kiley of the Liverpool Echo considered the song a "fine follow up" to "Obscurity Knocks". She praised the "good songwriting", "catchy guitars", "attractive harmonies" and "son-of-Morrissey vocals". David Quantick of New Musical Express commented, "A jolly jangle commences under a sweet voice and a folkie sort of pop tune. Vocals and melody a tad Roddy Frame but this is an enthusiastic bright pop affair and the Duane Eddy solo sucks your stomach out through your nose." Chris Roberts of Melody Maker wrote, "Oh boy, another Housemartins, another Aztec Camera, another bespectacled anally retentive piece of wacky buffoonery from the least gutsy label in the cosmos." In a review of Cake, Brent Ainsworth of the Santa Cruz Sentinel described "Only Tongue Can Tell" as a "playful romp through a green pasture of tinny guitar on a fresh-air keyboard backdrop".

== Track listing ==
7-inch and cassette single

1. "Only Tongue Can Tell" – 3:45
2. "Useless" – 4:32

12-inch and CD single

1. "Only Tongue Can Tell" – 3:45
2. "Useless" – 4:32
3. "Tonight You Belong to Me" – 2:38

== Personnel ==
Credits are adapted from the UK CD single liner notes and the Cake booklet.

The Trash Can Sinatras

- Frank Reader – vocals
- Paul Livingston – lead guitar
- John Douglas – rhythm guitar
- George McDaid – bass
- Stephen Douglas – drums

Additional musicians

- Clark Sorley – keyboards on "Only Tongue Can Tell"

Production

- The Trash Can Sinatras – producers of "Only Tongue Can Tell" and "Tonight You Belong to Me"
- Roger Béchirian – producer of "Useless"
- Tony Harris – mixing on "Only Tongue Can Tell" and "Tonight You Belong to Me"
- John Leckie – mixing on "Useless"

== Charts ==
Chart (1990–91)	Peak position
UK Singles (OCC)	77
US Billboard Modern Rock Tracks	8
