= Clark Boyd =

Clark Boyd may refer to:

- Clark Boyd (journalist)
- Clark Boyd (politician)
