= Laurence Tancredi =

American psychiatrist and lawyer

Laurence Tancredi is an American psychiatrist and lawyer. He is currently a Clinical Professor of Psychiatry at New York University School of Medicine. He was formerly the Kraft Eidman Professor of Medicine and the Law at the University of Texas Health Science Center at Houston. A graduate of the University of Pennsylvania School of Medicine, the Yale Law School, and psychiatric fellowship at Yale Medical School, Tancredi is the author or coauthor of numerous articles and several books on topics of law, ethics and psychiatry, including Dangerous Diagnostics: The Social Power of Biological Information (with D. Nelkin, University of Chicago Press, 1994) and When Law and Medicine Meet: A Cultural View (with L. Ross, Springer, 2007). His most recent book is Hardwired Behavior: What Neuroscience Reveals about Morality (Cambridge University Press, 2010).

Early in his career, Tancredi was involved in the development of a no-fault medical injury compensation system. Based on a review of appellate cases in Florida involving several surgical specialties, he demonstrated that adverse avoidable events could be identified, which could serve as the basis for compensation and quality assurance. The initial article incorporating this listing of events into a no-fault system was coauthored by Tancredi and Professor Clark Havighurst of the Duke University School of Law. This concept of no-fault was based on the theoretical thinking of Judge Guido Calabresi of the U.S. Court of Appeals (Second Circuit), who elaborated on this in his book The Cost of Accidents (Yale University Press, 1970).

In 1978, Tancredi, along with John S. Boyden Jr., a physician-lawyer who specialized in medical malpractice, were hired by the American Bar Association's Commission on Medical Professional Liability to conduct a repeat and more extensive study on avoidable events, referred to as "Designated Compensable Events (DCEs)". In a report published by the ABA, the Commission indicated that the feasibility of "designated compensable events" had been demonstrated for use in an automatic system of compensation and quality assurance. (see: Commission on Medical Professional Liability: Designated Compensable Event system, American Bar Association, 1980) Subsequently, Randy Bovbjerg, a lawyer and leading expert in medical malpractice at the Urban Institute, and Tancredi received funding through the Robert Wood Johnson Foundation to apply the DCE approach to three specific specialties—General Surgery, Obstetrics and Orthopedic Surgery. Several articles have been published on the results of those studies, the most recent of which reviews these events, now referred to as Accelerated-Compensation Events (ACEs), in the context of liability reform. (see: Liability reform should make patients safer: avoidable classes of events are a key improvement. (Bovbjerg, R.R.; Tancredi, L.R.) Journal of Law, Medicine and Ethics (Fall, 2005)).

He has written and edited a number of scholarly works with his cousin, medical anthropologist Lola Romanucci-Ross.
