= Weightlifting (album) =

Studio album by Trashcan Sinatras
- Released: 31 August 2004
- Genres: Indie pop, jangle pop
- Length: 44:19
- Label: SpinART
- Producers: Simon Dine, Trashcan Sinatras

Trashcan Sinatras chronology
A Happy Pocket (1996)	Weightlifting (2004)	In the Music (2009)

Weightlifting is the fourth studio album by the Scottish pop/rock band Trashcan Sinatras, released on 31 August 2004.

== Production ==
The album was financed by the band and through a grant from the Scottish Arts Council.

== Critical reception ==
Professional ratings
Aggregate scores
Source	Rating
Metacritic	81/100
Review scores
Source	Rating
AllMusic	4.5/5 stars
The Encyclopedia of Popular Music	3/5 stars
Filter	80%
Mojo	4.5/5 stars
Now	4/5 stars
The Observer	4/5 stars
Paste	3.5/5 stars
Rolling Stone	3/5 stars
Uncut	3/5 stars
Under the Radar	9/10

The Washington Post called the album "less jaunty than the band's early work, with a high percentage of string-swaddled laments about such subjects as faithless women, haunted widowers and unsolved child murders." Exclaim! wrote that "many of the compositions wander into slower, quieter places of lyrical introspection about love and love astray, while other upbeat numbers seem thrown in for good measure, abound with delightfully catchy guitar melodies and hopeful vocals." The A.V. Club wrote that "songs occasionally ride dangerously close to the adult-contemporary world (the weeping guitar on 'Leave Me Alone,' for example), but only in search of something simply adult." Robert Christgau considered the album to be a "dud".

== Track listing ==
No.	Title	Length
1.	"Welcome Back"	2:24
2.	"Got Carried Away"	3:48
3.	"All the Dark Horses"	4:10
4.	"What Women Do to Men"	4:04
5.	"Freetime"	2:26
6.	"Usually"	4:53
7.	"It's a Miracle"	3:09
8.	"A Coda"	2:44
9.	"Trouble Sleeping"	4:34
10.	"Country Air"	3:27
11.	"Leave Me Alone"	4:01
12.	"Weightlifting"	4:39
