= Cake (album) =

Studio album by the Trash Can Sinatras
- Released: 18 June 1990
- Studio: Shabby Road, Kilmarnock
- Genre: Indie pop, jangle pop
- Length: 39:31
- Label: Go! Discs/London
- Producer: John Leckie, Roger Béchirian

The Trash Can Sinatras chronology
Cake (1990)	I've Seen Everything (1993)

Singles from Cake
- 1. "Obscurity Knocks" Released: February 1990; 2. "Only Tongue Can Tell" Released: May 1990; 3. "Circling the Circumference" Released: October 1990

Cake is the debut studio album by Scottish pop/rock band the Trash Can Sinatras, released on 18 June 1990. The album peaked at No. 74 on the UK Albums Chart.

== Production ==
The album was recorded at Shabby Road, the band's studio that was paid for with their record advance.

== Critical reception ==
Professional ratings
Review scores
Source	Rating
AllMusic	4.5/5 stars
The Encyclopedia of Popular Music	4/5 stars
Entertainment Weekly	B+
Record Mirror	3.5/5 stars

Johnny Dee of Record Mirror described Cake as an album with "lush, layered guitars that strum and chime" and also noted the "sharp-witted lyrics" which are "over-running with inspired metaphores and word-play". He felt the album suffered from "over production", where "a thick fog descends over some tracks when perhaps misty morning fluffiness was the desired effect". He concluded, "But little can spoil the sheer beauty of 'You Made Me Feel', 'Thrupenny Tears' or alert pop of 'Obscurity Knocks' and 'Best Man's Fall'. A cherry short of a gateaux but plenty of chocolate."

Trouser Press described the album as "exceptionally good" and "pristine-sounding," writing that the producers add "an occasional light brush of cool jazz to the folky spines of the band's witty and agile tunes." Entertainment Weekly wrote: "Loaded with bright splashes of guitar and vocal harmonies, the five-member Scottish group Trash Can Sinatras’ debut album is breezy pop with a backbeat and mercifully little attitude." The Los Angeles Times called the album "tasty but hardly gripping." The Washington Post wrote that Cake "crafts elegant neo-pop soundscapes from little more than vocal harmonies and chiming semi-acoustic guitar riffs and strums." Time called it "an excellent brand of pub pop: simple, insinuating melodies, lyrics with propulsive good humor."

== Track listing ==
No.	Title	Length
1.	"Obscurity Knocks"	4:13
2.	"Maybe I Should Drive"	3:40
3.	"Thrupenny Tears"	5:15
4.	"Even the Odd"	3:25
5.	"The Best Man's Fall"	3:43
6.	"Circling the Circumference"	2:40
7.	"Funny"	4:16
8.	"Only Tongue Can Tell"	3:45
9.	"You Made Me Feel"	4:10
10.	"January's Little Joke"	4:47

== Personnel ==
The Trash Can Sinatras

- Francis Reader - vocals
- John Douglas, Paul Livingston - guitar
- George McDaid - bass
- Stephen Douglas - drums

with:

- Clark Sorley - piano on "Maybe I Should Drive", "Thrupenny Tears" and "You Made Me Feel", keyboards on "Only Tongue Can Tell"
- Ronnie Goodman - percussion on "Thrupenny Tears"
- Audrey Riley - strings on "Thrupenny Tears" and "Funny"
- Gavin McComb - cello on "The Best Man's Fall"
- Clare Thompson - violin on "Only Tongue Can Tell"
- Mags, Richeal Reader - backing vocals on "Circling the Circumference"

== Charts ==
2023 chart performance for Cake
Chart (2023)	Peak position
UK Albums (OCC)	55
