= Clarke (given name) =

Clarke is a given name that originated as a transferred use of the surname Clarke. It has been used as a given name since the 1600s. The names Clark and Clarke, along with their spelling variations, have been influenced by well-known figures such as Clark Gable. The name's use for girls was influenced by characters like Clarke Betancourt, a character in the 1990 film Mo' Better Blues and later by Clarke Griffin, a character in the television series The 100, which premiered in 2014.

== People ==
- Clarke Abel (c. 1789 – 1826), British surgeon and naturalist
- Clarke W. Brown (died 1956), American politician
- Clarke Carlisle (born 1979), English footballer
- Clarke Dermody (born 1980), New Zealand rugby union footballer
- Clarke Fraser (1920–2014), Canadian medical geneticist
- Clarke Hinkle (1909–1988), American National Football League player
- Clarke Hogan (born 1969), American politician
- Clarke Howard Johnson (1851–1930), justice of the Rhode Island Supreme Court
- Clarke Lewis (1840–1896), United States Representative from Mississippi
- Clarke MacArthur (born 1985), Canadian National Hockey League player
- Clarke Peters (born 1952), American actor, singer, writer and director
- Clarke Reed (born 1928), American politician
- Clarke Rosenberg (born 1993), American-Israeli basketball player
- Clarke Scholes (1930–2010), American swimmer and Olympic gold medalist
- Clarke Wilm (born 1976), Canadian hockey player

== See also ==
- Clark (given name)
- Clarke, a surname
