= Lola Romanucci-Ross =

American anthropologist

- Born: Hershey, Pennsylvania, USA
- Education: B.A. (Ohio University); M.A. (University of Minnesota); Ph.D. (Indiana University) 1963; post-doctoral study Ecole des Hautes Etudes
- Occupation: Anthropologist
- Spouses: James Monzolillo; Theodore Schwartz; John Ross, Jr., M.D.

Lola Romanucci-Ross (c. 1924 – April 29, 2017) was an American cultural anthropologist who has authored and co-authored a number of works on medical, social, and cultural anthropology, with fieldwork in Melanesia (Manus), rural Mexico, and her parents' home town in Italy. She was a long-time friend and collaborator of Margaret Mead, having done fieldwork with her in Manus, and later worked with her then-husband Theodore Schwartz on a team of social science researchers under the guidance of Erich Fromm in rural Mexico.

== Birth, early family life, and education ==
Romanucci was born in Hershey, Pennsylvania to first-generation Italian immigrants, Ignazio Romanucci (14 April 1894 – 18 February 1990) and Josephine (née Giovanozzi, 30 September 1899 – 22 April 1999). She earned her bachelor's degree at Ohio University in Athens, Ohio, her M.A. from the University of Minnesota, and Ph.D. from Indiana University. She also studied at the University of Chicago, and did post-doctoral study with Claude Levi-Strauss at l'Ecole des Hautes Etudes.

== Personal life ==
Like her friend and sometime mentor Margaret Mead, Romanucci was married three times. Her first husband was James Manzolillo, an engineer and naval architect, with whom she had a daughter. Her second husband was Theodore Schwartz, an anthropologist, with whom she had a son, and with whom she did fieldwork in both Manus (with Mead) and Mexico (with Erich Fromm and Frieda Fromm-Reichmann). She later married John Ross Jr. MD, a cardiologist at University of California, San Diego.

Several members of Lola Romanucci-Ross's family also became professionals and academics. She collaborated on several projects around social science and ethics of medicine with her cousin Laurence Tancredi. Her brother Demostene Romanucci (February 19, 1927 – April 11, 2012) was a physician in New York state.

== Career and later life ==
Romanucci-Ross participated in Erich Fromm's Chiconcuac Study in Mexico from 1958 to 1961, with her then-husband Theodore Schwartz; this fieldwork resulted first in her dissertation under the supervision of David Bidney and later in her classic ethnography Conflict, violence, and morality in a Mexican village.

She was a member of the New Guinea and Admiralty Island Expedition (1963–1967). Directed by Margaret Mead, the project was sponsored by the American Museum of Natural History in New York. It included two years of field work on Manus Island, in the Admiralty Islands of Papua New Guinea.

In 1970, she began a longitudinal study of medical and psychological anthropology as well as social structure and linguistics in Ascoli Piceno, Italy. This project continued for over two decades. It resulted in the publication of the book One Hundred Towers: An Italian Odyssey of Cultural Survival.

Romanucci-Ross has spent most of her professional career at University of California, San Diego (UCSD), where she was among the early faculty in the social sciences and at the School of Medicine. A long-time affiliate of the Department of Anthropology, she was the Director of Interdisciplinary Studies, Contemporary Issues and Cultural Traditions, and subsequently Professor of Family and Preventive Medicine.

In the early 2000s, she and her husband established the John and Lola Ross Award in the Sciences and Culture of Medicine, which is given annually at UCSD School of Medicine to a "graduating medical student who has shown high capability and dedication to the medical sciences as well as demonstrable interest and involvement in scholarly or professional activities that are concerned with cultural influences on medical practice and research." She died April 29, 2017.

== Publications ==
=== As sole author ===
- One Hundred Towers: An Italian Odyssey of Cultural Survival (1971) New York, New York: Bergin & Garvey
- Conflict, violence, and morality in a Mexican village (1973) Palo Alto, California: National Press Books. ISBN 0874842778
- Mead's other Manus : phenomenology of the encounter. (1985) South Hadley, Massachusetts: Bergin & Garvey.
- To Love the Stranger: The Making of An Anthropologist (2012) North Charleston, South Carolina: CreateSpace

=== As editor or coauthor ===
- The anthropology of medicine: from culture to method. (1983) Lola Romanucci-Ross, Daniel E. Moerman, Laurence R. Tancredi, eds. New York, New York: Praeger.
- When law and medicine meet: a cultural view. (2004) Lola Romanucci-Ross and Laurence Tancredi, eds. Dordrecht & Boston: Kluwer Academic Publishers.
- Ethnic identity: problems and prospects for the twenty-first century, 4th ed (2006) Lola Romanucci-Ross, George A. De Vos, and Takeyuki Tsuda, eds. Lanham, Maryland: AltaMira Press.

== See also ==
- Margaret Mead
- Laurence Tancredi
- Symbolic anthropology
