= I've Seen Everything =

Studio album by the Trash Can Sinatras
- Released: 3 May 1993
- Studio: Shabby Road, Kilmarnock
- Length: 44:27
- Label: Go! Discs; London (US)
- Producer: Ray Shulman

The Trash Can Sinatras chronology
Cake (1990)	I've Seen Everything (1993)	A Happy Pocket (1996)

I've Seen Everything is the second studio album by Scottish band the Trash Can Sinatras, released by Go! Discs on 3 May 1993. The album reached No. 50 on the UK Albums Chart.

== Background ==
The album was recorded at the band's own 24-track studio, Shabby Road Studios in Kilmarnock and mixed at Orinoco Studios in London. Three singles were released from the album: "Hayfever" (No. 61 on the UK Singles Chart), "I've Seen Everything" and "Bloodrush" (promotional only).

Speaking to Glide Magazine in 2018, Francis Reader recalled of I've Seen Everything: "It's still one of the fans' favourites. It was a big step for us too, lyrically and musically. John started to write a lot more [and] Paul too. I was trying to keep up with people, really. They were writing great songs."

== Critical reception ==
Professional ratings
Review scores
Source	Rating
AllMusic	4/5 stars
NME	5/10
Pitchfork	8.6/10
Select	3/5 stars

Upon its release, Tim Harrison of the Ealing Leader described I've Seen Everything as a "melodic, velvety concoction" with "a lot of subject matter" and "strong echoes of The Housemartins". He concluded, "I've Seen Everything [is] an economic, restrained and sensitive collection well worth listening to." The Irish Independent wrote, "Their debut was a fine beginning, but on its successor they've hardened their approach and broadened the scope of their songwriting. Whereas before they tended to sit back and admire their pretty chord structures, they're now audibly relishing the opportunity to get stuck in to the material."

Dave Jennings of Melody Maker was more mixed in his review, commenting that the album, though "initially relaxing and refreshing", is "awfully low on the sort of obvious excitement we regular indie-rock consumers are conditioned to expect". He described it as being "built from baroque acoustic guitar flourishes, hushed voices and downbeat, fragile sentiments" and noted the "clever musical and lyrical twists hidden away", but felt that "you need a hell of lot of patience to get through all the aggravating precious bits to the little glimmers of gold". He added that there's "something terribly world-weary and defeatist" about the album and considered its "modest, gentle virtues" to be "that bit too old-fashioned for 1993". He picked "One At a Time" as the highlight, noting that it's "sung in tones of deep disgust, backed up with the kind of muscular, chopping chords resolutely resisted on the rest of the LP". Paul Moody of the NME was indifferent to much of the material, noting the same "world weary crooning [and] thesaurus robbery", as well as more of the "heart-strung guitars and winsome lyric[s] about life's injustices", as seen on Cake. He singled out the "sad afternoon love song" "Hayfever" as "an absolute peach" and added that the title track "isn't bad either, if you liked the Beautiful South's 'A Little Time'". He felt both were "top ten hits in another universe" but considered the lengthy time between the albums to have hurt the band, noting that they have "marginalised themselves without ever having built up a following to sustain them".

In the US, Brent Ainsworth of the Santa Cruz Sentinel felt the album was "abundant [with] luscious, flowing pop", with the "softer songs" being best. David Mark of the Asbury Park Press described I've Seen Everything as "a notch more somber" but "an equally interesting effort" to the band's debut album Cake. He commented, "The work, always interesting musically and lyrically, is something of a cross between The Beatles' Rubber Soul and XTC's Skylarking." The St. Louis Post-Dispatch considered the album to "combine sweet tunes and acoustic settings with melancholy speculations about the could-be's, the would-be's and the stinging bees of life". Larry Printz of The Morning Call stated, "Full of great texture, swirling melodicism, and ironic songwriting, this Scottish band delivers the goods. This album has a greater depth than you'd expect from just jangly guitars." He highlighted "I'm Immortal", "Worked a Miracle" and "Killing the Cabinet" as three of the album's "notable tracks".

Peter Holmes of Australia's Sydney Morning Herald described the album as "an inspired recording", which "jumps confidently from uneasy acoustic pop through chunky guitar revs and slow note picking". He highlighted "I'm Immortal" for containing "a chorus the Beatles would've been proud of", along with "One at a Time", which he considered to be "propelled by raging guitars, chaotic criss-crossed vocals and the lead guitar line of the year". Holmes added, "Shulman deserves praise for allowing the band to spray wide on the canvas; for an album to be all over the place yet strangely cohesive is no small feat."

== Track listing ==
All tracks are written by the Trash Can Sinatras.

No.	Title	Length
1.	"Easy Read"	2:55
2.	"Hayfever"	3:15
3.	"Bloodrush"	3:22
4.	"Worked a Miracle"	3:18
5.	"The Perfect Reminder"	1:08
6.	"Killing the Cabinet"	2:44
7.	"Orange Fell"	4:07
8.	"I'm Immortal"	3:53
9.	"Send for Henny"	3:18
10.	"Iceberg"	1:22
11.	"One at a Time"	3:45
12.	"I've Seen Everything"	4:01
13.	"The Hairy Years"	2:48
14.	"Earlies"	4:42

== Personnel ==
The Trash Can Sinatras

- Francis Reader – vocals, guitar
- Paul Livingston – guitar
- John Douglas – guitar
- David Hughes – bass
- Stephen Douglas – drums

Additional musicians

- Sam Francis – vocals (track 9)
- Larry Primrose – piano (track 2), bongos (track 8)
- Allison Thomson – trumpet (track 12)
- Nick Ingham – string arrangements (tracks 1–2)

Production

- Ray Shulman – producer, engineer, mixing
- Larry Primrose – engineer, mixing

Other

- John Douglas – paintings
- Neil Cooper – photography

== Charts ==
Chart (1993)	Peak position
UK Albums Chart	50
