= A Happy Pocket =

Studio album by the Trash Can Sinatras
- Released: 2 September 1996
- Length: 53:23
- Label: Go! Discs
- Producer: The Trash Can Sinatras

The Trash Can Sinatras chronology
I've Seen Everything (1993)	A Happy Pocket (1996)	Weightlifting (2004)

A Happy Pocket is the third studio album by the Scottish band the Trash Can Sinatras, released by Go! Discs on 2 September 1996. Upon its original release, the album reached number 125 in the UK Albums Chart. It fared better in 2023, when a reissue on the Last Night From Glasgow label saw the album reach number 77.

== Background ==
A Happy Pocket was recorded at the band's own 24-track studio, Shabby Road Studios in Kilmarnock. The album was originally given a release date of 20 May 1996, but this was later pushed back to 2 September. An EP and four singles were released from the album: "The Genius I Was" (promotional only), "The Main Attraction" EP (UK No. 182), "Twisted and Bent" (UK No. 121), "How Can I Apply...?" (UK No. 172) and "To Sir, With Love" (UK No. 88).

After Go! Discs was acquired by Universal in 1996, the Trash Can Sinatras were dropped from the label. They were subsequently forced to sell their studio and declare bankruptcy. John Douglas told AXS in 2017: "Being made bankrupt meant we couldn't really work as a band; we couldn't put out records, we couldn't tour, any money that was made would have to be used to pay bills and creditors." The band later returned to the studio to record Weightlifting, which was released in 2004.

== Critical reception ==
Professional ratings
Review scores
Source	Rating
AllMusic	2.5/5 stars

On its release, Colm O'Callaghan of the Sunday Tribune wrote: "One Kilmarnock five-piece, three reluctant guitars, six dashing harmonies, one huge storm. Insistent melodies play foil to pun-heavy vignettes and kitchen-sink dramas making A Happy Pocket a pearl among swine." Neil McKay of Sunday Life commented: "This is a frustrating album, offering teasing glimpses of what could be a major talent. The Sinatras deal in bog standard jingly-jangly guitar pop, leavened with a handful of songs that have rather greater pretensions. Yet, when they get it right, they make pop of rare quality." McKay singled out "The Safecracker" and "The Pop Place" as examples of the latter.

Katherine Monk of The Vancouver Sun wrote: "Strung together with guitar reverb and violins, the sound is an acid trip through the red velvet lounge. The snags come where they always have, when the band descends into the bland bunker of Britpop where the sounds are so soft, they stick together." Monk picked "Outside, "To Sir, With Love" and "Main Attraction" as the album's "standouts". Tim DiGravina of AllMusic considered A Happy Pocket "a bit of letdown" in comparison to the band's first two "glorious pop masterpieces". He commented: "Murky production, strange vocal effects that obscure Reader's delicate voice, and an over-reliance on mandolin overdubs make for a generally less than engaging listen. At least one-third of the album comes across like a collection of fleshless demos." He picked "The Safecracker", "Twisted & Bent", "How Can I Apply...?" and "The Therapist" as being "absolutely sublime" and "fine additions to the Trash Can canon".

== Track listing ==
All tracks are written by the Trash Can Sinatras except "To Sir, with Love" by Mark London and Don Black.

No.	Title	Length
1.	"Outside"	5:07
2.	"Twisted and Bent"	3:20
3.	"Unfortunate Age"	3:31
4.	"To Sir, with Love"	4:41
5.	"Make Yourself at Home"	3:27
6.	"The Main Attraction"	3:09
7.	"How Can I Apply...?"	2:51
8.	"The Pop Place"	3:08
9.	"The Genius I Was"	3:04
10.	"The Sleeping Policeman"	4:05
11.	"I Must Fly"	4:29
12.	"I'll Get Them In"	3:39
13.	"The Safecracker"	5:22
14.	"The Therapist"	3:23

== Personnel ==
The Trash Can Sinatras

- Francis Reader – vocals, guitar
- Paul Livingston – guitar
- John Douglas – guitar
- David Hughes – bass
- Stephen Douglas – drums

Additional musicians

- Paul McGeechan – piano, organ
- Allison Thomson – trumpet
- Scott Walker – saxophone
- Davie Crichton – violin
- David McCluskey – dulcimer

Production

- Hugh Jones, Helen Woodward – mixing (track 1, 3, 7, 9)
- Larry Primrose – mixing (2, 6, 10, 12–14), engineer (tracks 2, 6)
- Vincenzo Townsend – engineer and mixing (track 11)
- Steve Whitfield – engineer (tracks 1–3, 5–7, 9–10, 12–14)

Other

- Colin Dunsmuir – photography
- Christine Frew – front cover drawing
- Niamh and Simon at Ryan Art – sleeve layout

== Charts ==
Chart (1996)	Peak position
UK Albums Chart	125

Chart (2023)	Peak position
Scottish Albums (OCC)	3
UK Albums Chart	77
