= Obscurity Knocks =

Single by The Trash Can Sinatras

from the album Cake
- B-side: "Who's He?"; "The Best Man's Fall"
- Released: February 1990 (UK)
- Genre: Rock, pop rock, indie rock
- Length: 3:36 (7" edit); 4:13 (album version)
- Label: Go! Discs; London Records
- Songwriter(s): Frank Reader; Paul Livingston; John Douglas; George McDaid; Stephen Douglas
- Producer(s): Roger Béchirian

The Trash Can Sinatras singles chronology
"Obscurity Knocks" (1990)	"Only Tongue Can Tell" (1990)

"Obscurity Knocks" is a song by Scottish band The Trash Can Sinatras, which was released in 1990 as an extended play (and promotional single in the United States) from their debut studio album Cake. It was written by all five band members and produced by Roger Béchirian. The EP reached No. 86 in the UK and remained on the chart for four weeks. In 1991, the song reached No. 12 on the Billboard Modern Rock Tracks chart.

== Critical reception ==
On its release, Kevin Murphy of Record Mirror described "Obscurity Knocks" as "pleasantly-strummed, inoffensive pop" and commented, "This lot keep up Scotland's fine tradition for producing guitar pop, with the likes of Aztec Camera springing to mind. Melodic and mature with a neat sense of drama, they're a touch astute to be dismissed as twee, jangling guitar music. A plusher sound should see them embellish the charts some day." Tim Southwell of Record Mirror stated, "'Obscurity Knocks' is an absolute howitzer of a single with one eye firmly on the Top 40, jangly guitars, a snappy beat and some marvellously intriguing lyrics providing the ideal backdrop for Frank's love-torn vocals." Bob Stanley of Melody Maker said that beyond the band's "dreadful name", "Obscurity Knocks" has a "strong melody reminiscent of the Housemartins and the La's, some neat xylophone to touch up the chorus, and a singer not afraid to sound Scottish without resorting to the porridge gargling antics of the Proclaimers". He added that "everything's dandy except the lyrics which are 90 per cent gruesome puns that even Elvis Costello would think twice about".

Andrew Collins of New Musical Express picked it as one of the magazine's "singles of the week" and described the EP as a "four-song miracle of human life" and "overwhelming winsome and winning". He wrote, "Aztec Camera, the Housemartins, the Smiths and the La's – all very special groups, and now you can listen to them all at once! Perfect. Crystalline. Divine. Confident..." Penny Kiley of the Liverpool Echo praised the song as being a "beautifully melodic guitar jangle that lifts the spirits straight away". She noted how Reader's vocals were reminiscent of Roddy Frame and felt the song musically had "hints of the Housemartins and a bit of the Smiths". Jennifer Grant of the Perthshire Advertiser described it as an "excellent single" and one that has a "sprinkle of the Smiths, a touch of the Bluebells and just a hint of Roddy Frame about it".

In a review of Cake, Orange Coast Magazine described the song as one of the "standouts" on "this fine debut". In a retrospective review of Cake, Norm Elrod of AllMusic described the song, along with the album's other singles, as the "tastiest pieces of pure pop pleasure". In a 1999 review of the album by CMJ New Music Report, Carlene Bauer commented: "'Obscurity Knocks,' a high-spirited grouse about fickle fame and fleeting youth, is the best - and eeriest - number." Colin Larkin, in his 1995 book The Guinness Encyclopedia of Popular Music, described the song as "plaintive".

== Track listing ==
7-inch EP

1. "Obscurity Knocks" – 3:36
2. "Who's He?" – 2:58
3. "The Best Man's Fall" – 3:39

12-inch EP

1. "Obscurity Knocks" – 3:36
2. "The Best Man's Fall" – 3:39
3. "Drunken Chorus" – 4:11
4. "Who's He?" – 2:58

Cassette EP

1. "Obscurity Knocks" – 3:36
2. "Who's He?" – 2:58
3. "The Best Man's Fall" – 3:39

CD EP

1. "Obscurity Knocks" – 3:36
2. "The Best Man's Fall" – 3:39
3. "Drunken Chorus" – 4:11
4. "Who's He?" – 2:58

CD single (US promo)

1. "Obscurity Knocks (Edit)" - 3:35
2. "Obscurity Knocks (Album Version)" - 4:10

== Personnel ==
The Trash Can Sinatras

- Frank Reader – vocals
- Paul Livingston – lead guitar
- John Douglas – rhythm guitar
- George McDaid – bass
- Stephen Douglas – drums

Production

- Roger Béchirian – producer
- Peter Rose – assistant producer, engineer
- Tony Harris – engineer
- John Leckie – mixing on "Obscurity Knocks"

Other

- Ben Argueta – design (US release)
- Porterhouse Management – management

== Charts ==
Chart (1990–91)	Peak position
UK Singles (OCC)	86
US Alternative Airplay (Billboard)	12
