= Hayfever (song) =

Single by The Trash Can Sinatras

from the album I've Seen Everything
- B-side: "Say"
- Released: 13 April 1993
- Length: 3:15
- Label: Go! Discs
- Songwriter(s): Frank Reader; Paul Livingston; John Douglas; David Hughes; Stephen Douglas
- Producer(s): Ray Shulman

The Trash Can Sinatras singles chronology
"Circling the Circumference" (1990)	"Hayfever" (1993)	"I've Seen Everything" (1993)

"Hayfever" is a song by Scottish band The Trash Can Sinatras, which was released in 1993 as the lead single from their second studio album I've Seen Everything. The song was written by all five band members and produced by Ray Shulman. "Hayfever" reached No. 61 in the UK Singles Chart and No. 11 in the Billboard Modern Rock Tracks chart.

== Background ==
"Hayfever" was recorded at Shabby Road Studios in Kilmarnock, Scotland, and mixed at Orinoco Studios in London.

== Critical reception ==
Upon its release as a single, Paul Mathar of Melody Maker commented, "Another daft name, and another pleasant surprise. Trash Can Sinatras seem to have undergone some sort of salvation, deciding they don't really care whether anyone likes them or not and with that carelessness has come the revelation that maybe they're rather good after all." Penny Kiley of the Liverpool Echo praised it as "Indie pop with a big sound and big emotional pull, bathed in melody". She added, "The band work in the same Scottish pop tradition as bands like the Bluebells or Aztec Camera and have much of the same appeal: brains and great tunes." Peter Kinghorn of the Evening Chronicle noted the "effective piano opening", followed by a "strong tempo" that "contrasts with low-key singing". Nigel Vincent of The Northern Echo wrote, "Tinkling piano, string arrangements, guitars and strong vocals add up to an inspiring tune".

Johnny Dee of NME was less enthusiastic and described the song as an example of the "kind of music that American College Radio laps up as quality British indie rock and that, coincidentally, no one in Britain seems to like". He added, "MOR fear holds anyone back from truly loving the Trash Cans, they sound just a little too serious and keen on over-production." In a review of I've Seen Everything, Scott Bacon of The Indianapolis Star described "Hayfever" as "bouncy" and considered the song to have "hit written all over it". He also praised Nick Ingham's string arrangement which he felt "enhance[d]" the song. Brad Webber of the Chicago Tribune commented, "On 'Hayfever', Reader wistfully sings about solving life's problems 'with a couple of tablets'."

== Track listing ==
7-inch and cassette single

1. "Hayfever" – 3:15
2. "Say" – 2:51

12-inch and CD single

1. "Hayfever" – 3:15
2. "Say" – 2:51
3. "Kangaroo Court" – 3:02
4. "Skin Diving" – 3:47

== Personnel ==
Credits are adapted from the UK CD single liner notes and the I've Seen Everything booklet.

The Trash Can Sinatras

- Frank Reader – vocals, guitar
- Paul Livingston – guitar
- John Douglas – guitar
- David Hughes – bass
- Stephen Douglas – drums

Additional personnel

- Larry Primrose – piano on "Hayfever"
- Nick Ingham – string arrangement on "Hayfever"

Production

- Ray Shulman – producer, engineer, mixing
- Larry Primrose – engineer, mixing

Other

- John Douglas – sleeve painting

== Charts ==
Chart (1993)	Peak position
UK Singles (OCC)	61
US Billboard Modern Rock Tracks	11
