= Clark S. Hobbs =

Clark Simpson Hobbs (July 1, 1888 in Baltimore, Maryland – July 13, 1973 in Baltimore, Maryland) was a reporter, columnist, and editor. His writing led to the Baltimore Redevelopment Commission and his appointment as Chairman. He was also Vice President of Goucher College.

== Early life and education ==
His parents were Reverend Gustavus Warfield Hobbs and Jeannette Dawson Richardson Hobbs. In 1907, Clark graduated from the Baltimore City College. He then married Janet Septima Tustin on December 5, 1914, and, on November 6, 1915, she gave birth to their daughter, Pauline Tustin Hobbs.

== Career ==
Between 1919 and 1945, Hobbs was a reporter, columnist, and associate editor of The Evening Sun. He wrote a daily humor column titled "Good Evening" from 1921 to 1935. In 1945, Hobbs became the Vice President of Goucher College, for six consecutive years. Starting approximately in 1911, Clark S. Hobbs volunteered in activities, in which most of them were community-related. Some activities were as the Trustee of Goucher College, Director of Baltimore Goodwill Industries, Inc., Chairman of Baltimore Redevelopment Commission and, Chairman of Advisory Committee on Sanitation.

During his time working for The Evening Sun, Hobbs wrote articles on Baltimore and its poor conditions. It helped others realize that the conditions in which they were living were not good, and so, in 1945 the Baltimore Redevelopment Commission was created. Hobbs was given the position as Chairman by Mayor McKeldin. He initiated and negotiated the renewal projects for South Waverly, the Broadway area, and Area 12 (Mt. Royal Plaza). On July 13, 1973, at the University of Maryland Hospital in Baltimore, Clark Simpson Hobbs died.

== Sources ==
- “Clark S. Hobbs gets new post at Goucher,” Evening Sun, April 30, 1945.
- G.H. Pouder, “People of the Town: 2-Prophet of Urban Renewal,” Baltimore, May, 1962.
- Hobbs, Pauline. Clark S. Hobbs: Biographical Notes. June 24, 1974. Enoch Pratt Free Library, Baltimore, MD.
