= Clark Sorley =

Clark Sorley 2010
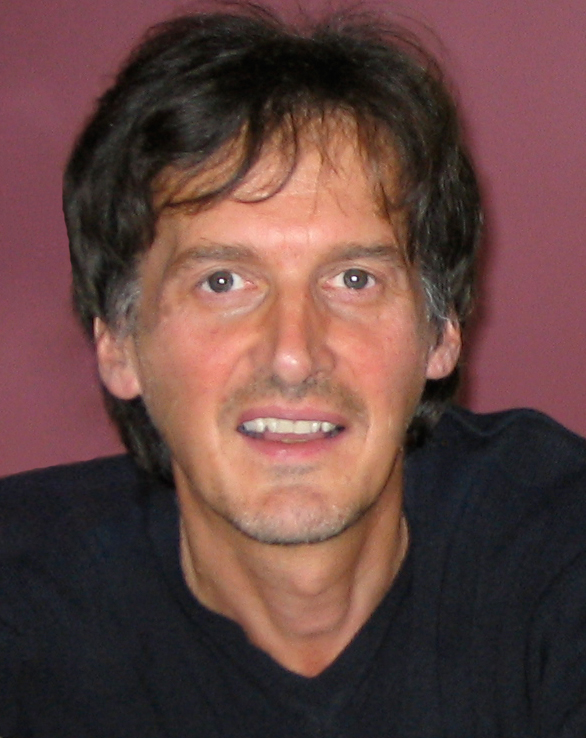
- Born: 31 July 1956 (age 69); Kilmarnock, Ayrshire, Scotland
- Occupation: Record producer
- Years active: 1973–present
- Website: www.clarksorley.com

Alexander Clark Sorley (born 31 July 1956) is a Scottish record producer from Ayrshire, Scotland. He was co-founder of Sirocco Recording Studio in Kilmarnock which ran from 1978-1989.

== Music recordings ==
During a career spanning five decades Sorley has made upwards of 10,000 music recordings, the majority of these being for commercial release or broadcast. The remainder is unreleased material numbering around 1,300 works most of which Sorley either composed, arranged, produced or performed. The unreleased archive has been recently curated and remastered for online streaming.

== Sirocco ==
After playing in pub-rock bands in the first half of the 1970s Sorley started Sirocco Studio with a bunch of musician friends. Over the next eleven years it became one of the most widely used facilities in Scotland, initially favoured by post-punk bands like The Laughing Apple and Positive Noise for its lo-fi credentials. Although in later years it came to be owned and managed by Sorley it began in a collective spirit with an emphasis on nurturing emergent talent. Thousands of musicians cut their studio teeth at Sirocco. Many went on to have careers in the business such as the studio's engineer, Frank Reader, whose band Trashcan Sinatras bought Sorley out following their signing to Go! Discs in 1989. The studio name was then changed to Shabby Road.

Among artists of note known to have worked at Sirooco in the 1980s were Del Amitri, The Bluebells, Aztec Camera, Kissing the Pink, Alan McGee, Andrew Innes, Martin Taylor, Alexander Stoddart, Hamish Imlach, Eddi Reader, Elaine C Smith, Mike Ogletree, Terry Neason, Tiger Tim Stevens, Mr. Superbad, Mary Kiani, Big George and the Business and Jimmy Dewar.

In 1985 James Kelman edited his "Writers For Miners" project in Sirocco. It was a live recording made by Sorley in The Third Eye Centre in Glasgow of Scotland's prominent poets and novelists at the time. The same year Dick Gaughan, also in support of the miners, made the True & Bold album at the studio for the S.T.U.C. which Sorley co-produced.

Around the same time Tracey Ullman and Robbie Coltrane came to the studio to perform on the music tracks for BBC Scotland's A Kick Up the Eighties. Also for the BBC, saxophonist Tommy Smith filmed part of a documentary about his career there as did cult Glasgow band Scheme for Channel 4. Scheme had previously recorded their first album funded by Glasgow City Council at Sirocco.

Glasgow based record labels Klub, Lismor and Corban recorded over 100 albums in Sirocco with mainly traditional Scottish music artists including The Alexander Brothers, Andy Stewart, Kenneth McKellar, Peter Morrison, Robert Urquhart and Bill McCue. For Lismor the studio made location recordings of the Royal Highland Fusiliers, the 78th Fraser Highlanders and Shotts and Dykehead Pipe Band. Folk singer Alastair McDonald, owner of Corban, was a regular client who Sorley continues to work with today.

== Radio Clyde ==
Sorley joined the music production department at Radio Clyde in 1979 working with Andy Park and Bob McDowall. He recorded for Clyde's jazz oriented library label which produced records with Carol Kidd, Bobby Wishart, Danny Street, Bobby Wellins and Peggy O'Keefe.

Over an eighteen-month period at Radio Clyde, Sorley made broadcast recordings of: Rose Royce, Lulu, Gordon Giltrap, Durutti Column, The Fall, Bad Manners, Pete Shelley, Orange Juice, Spandau Ballet, The Stiff Tour, Climax Chicago Blues Band, Alice Cooper, The Pretenders, Simple Minds, Depeche Mode, 10cc, Funkapolitan, Wang Chung, Morrissey–Mullen, Mike Westbrook, Stan Tracey, Don Weller, Jimmy Deuchar, Al Cohn, Benjamin Luxon, Peter Pears, the Royal Scottish National Orchestra and the Scottish Chamber Orchestra.

Sorley left the Clyde staff in 1981 and as a free-lance produced programmes for the station with live music content, recording many headline artists including Ben E. King, The Drifters, The Waitresses, The Average White Band, Mari Wilson, Big Audio Dynamite, Slade, Runrig and Shakatak. He also covered the Pope's visit to Glasgow in 1982.

All these live recordings were done using Mobile Two, a 24-track unit custom-built to a high spec by the Clyde engineers under John Lumsden. They were remixed in the station's multi-track studio and produced to record master quality. They are part of a larger body of live recordings done by Radio Clyde referred to in The Guardian in 2003 as "a musical treasure trove" when discovered years later.

== Independent ==
Away from Sirocco and Clyde, Sorley worked independently in a variety of music related roles. He was musical director on Scottish Television's Terry Neason Show in 1987. He also appeared live with Terry at The Donmar Warehouse and on Radio 2. His work with singer-songwriter James Oliver resulted in two of their collaborations rising to the finals of BBC's A Song For Europe in 1988 and 1989. Sorley performed live on the show and on Wogan. He spent a few weeks in 1983 playing bass with Liverpool band The Lotus Eaters prior to the release of their first hit single on Arista. The same year he worked with Orchestral Manoeuvres in the Dark at David Balfe's studio in the Scottish Highlands. For 15 years from 1986 Sorley produced a broadcast of West Sound Radio's annual Burns Supper. The biggest such event in the world, it was represented by a star cast, from ex prime ministers to leading clergy and celebrities. Other notable artists recorded during his time as an independent were Les Dennis, Daniel O'Donnell and Isobel Buchanan.

Sorley became involved in consultancy work for the Scottish Development Agency in the late 80s. After extensive research in the UK and US working with Simon Frith, Alex Neil and John Swinney, he drew up a set of proposals with comprehensive ideas and business plans for furthering the music industry in Scotland. In the absence of suitable funding partners the project never progressed beyond being a research initiative.

== Recording artist ==
The folk-rock band Dalriada was created by Sorley in 1991 with studio colleagues Colin Kennedy and Robbie Dale. Iona Records released their first album "All Is Fair" later that year. It was made up mainly of Sorley's arrangements of traditional Scottish songs. The album was a critical success praised by Alastair Clark in The Scotsman for “sheer adventure and innovation”. A follow up "Sophistry & Illusion" was released in 1998. All original material this time by Sorley & Kennedy, it was also well reviewed - “powerful and innovative with gritty sentiment” said The Scots Magazine. It was re-released by Strathan Music in 2001.

Sorley worked with film-maker Ian Roy on the Rainmaker project in 1999. It merged films of Scottish landscapes by Roy to Sorley's music tracks. The music was subsequently used by photographer Alan Wright of Lyrical Scotland for his series of travel DVDs.

== Production company ==
With ex-Sirocco mate George Cowan and backers Douglas Cardow and Iain Robertson, the production company Rainmaker-Sonic was set up in 2000. The venture did not fulfill its aims but during its run Sorley established a relationship with Scott Gibson, then manager of R&B singer Rosie Gaines. Sorley and Gibson collaborated on a number of projects over the next few years including work for Gaines as well as having the dance track "Back & Forth" signed to Warners. It was sung by Alice Campbell with production and additional writing by Sorley. The track was not released due to sample clearance issues.

== Record label ==
In April 2010 Legacy Scotland was launched as Sorley's online music label. Consistent with changes in the way recorded music is distributed and marketed, an experimental release schedule was implemented by putting out one four-track EP every month, a track each week. The label's design concept is a deliberate “library” style, i.e. each release uses generic artwork with no photographs thus reflecting the fact that the recordings are the producer's work in which the performers have collaborated. Most of the label's performers are from the community of musicians around Sorley's current studio in Kilmarnock.

== Personal life ==
Sorley remains unmarried and has spent the greater part of his private life pursuing intellectual interests. He was three years at Edinburgh University in the 1990s doing recreational study, centrally philosophy, and following a further period of reading started writing a series of short essays in 2002. They have since become the weblog "What I Think" currently numbering around 500 items with discussion on philosophy, music, relationships and personal issues. There is also some broader commentary including critiques on current affairs.
