= Clark Adams =

American author (1969–2007)

Clark Davis Adams
- Born: July 23, 1969; Louisville, Kentucky, U.S.
- Died: May 21, 2007 (aged 37)
- Occupation: Author

Clark Davis Adams (July 23, 1969 – May 21, 2007) was a prominent American freethought leader and activist.

== Early life ==
Adams was born in July 1969, in Louisville, Kentucky. As a child, he attended Catholic school, but became skeptical of the church's teachings at an early age. After reading material from American Atheists, he became, in his words, "a pretty hard core atheist" in college.

== Career ==
While attending a "Freethought Blitz" weekend in the Birmingham, Alabama, area, he became friends with many influential atheists. The same year, he became active with the Alabama Freethought Association and the Atlanta Freethought Society. He served as the primary organizer of the annual celebration Lollapalooza of Freethought. He also became the moderator of the newsgroup alt.atheism.moderated and organized three real-life meetings with participants of alt.atheism.

For many years, Clark Adams was a member of the Internet Infidels board, serving as its public relations director for many years and then as president. He was also, in his words, a freethought "conference junkie", attending and often speaking at many events within the community of freethought.

Clark Adams actively promoted the Secular Student Alliance and briefly sat on the Board of Directors for the group. He was also one of the founders of the Secular Coalition for America. In his hometown, he founded and was deeply involved with the Las Vegas Freethought Society, which he described as "a local group of fun godless heathens in Sin City." After Adams' suicide the organization made a Clark Adams memorial page. He was also for a time president of the Humanist Association of Las Vegas and Southern Nevada, a chapter of the American Humanist Association. Shortly before his death, he became an AHA life member.

Clark Adams is one of many American freethinkers listed in Warren Allen Smith's satirically titled book, Who's Who in Hell.

== Death ==
Adams had a track dedicated to him in comedian Doug Stanhope's album From Across The Street; Adams deliberately postponed his suicide so he could attend Stanhope's show.
