= Clark Strand =

American spiritual writer

Clark Strand (born August 14, 1957) is an American author and teacher, mainly on spirituality and religion. In 1993 he became the first Senior Editor of Tricycle: The Buddhist Review. He writes about his explorations of numerous types of spiritual paths and religions. He left his position at Tricycle in 1996 and moved to Woodstock, New York, to write and teach full-time.

He is also a poet and has written two books that feature or include his poetry.

== Early life and education ==
Strand was born in 1957, and grew up in Arkansas and Alabama. The family moved to Atlanta in 1971, and Strand graduated from the Lovett School in 1975.

Strand was raised as a Southern Presbyterian, and converted to Buddhism in the 1970s. He studied philosophy and religion at Sewanee: The University of the South in Sewanee, Tennessee, graduating in 1980.

== Career ==
Strand began his post-university career as a Zen Buddhist monk. In 1988, he left the Dai Bosatsu Zendo, a Rinzai Zen Buddhist monastery in upstate New York and became the director of New York Zendo, a Rinzai Zen Buddhist temple in New York City. In 1990 he resigned from New York Zendo and ceased being a Buddhist monk.

Following a few years of psychoanalysis, he became the first senior editor of Tricycle: The Buddhist Review in 1993. He also continued his decades-long exploration of the spiritual traditions of the world in search of a more spiritually-evolved version of religion that was compatible with modern life; the journey took him inside of numerous communities including Buddhist temples, Hasidic synagogues, Christian monasteries, and Hindu cults. This eventually led to his books Meditation Without Gurus (2003) and How to Believe in God: Whether You Believe in Religion or Not (2009).

In 1996, Strand left his position as senior editor of Tricycle: The Buddhist Review, and moved to Woodstock, New York to write and teach full time.

In January 2000, Strand founded the Koans of the Bible Study Group (since renamed Woodstock Buddhist Bible Study), a weekly inter-religious discussion group devoted to finding a new paradigm for religious belief and practice. He also founded the Green Meditation Society in Woodstock, which promotes an ecologically-based approach to spiritual practice, drawing upon the environmental teachings of the world's great religious traditions.

In the early 2000s, he began exploring Soka Gakkai International, which originated from Soka Gakkai Japan, a humanistic religion based on the teachings of the 13th-century Japanese monk, Nichiren, who lived in Kamakura period. This led him to write Waking the Buddha: How the Most Dynamic and Empowering Buddhist Movement in History Is Changing Our Concept of Religion (2014).

Strand has written additional books on spirituality, as well as articles on a variety of religious, spiritual, and ecological themes. He writes for The Washington Post, The Huffington Post, The New York Times, Newsweek’s On Faith blog, Tricycle, Body & Soul, Spirituality & Health, and several other publications.

He also lectures and teaches classes, workshops, and retreats. In May 2015, he participated in the First White House U.S. Buddhist Leaders Conference.

Strand is also a poet, and has written two books that feature or include his poetry: Seeds from a Birch Tree: Writing Haiku and the Spiritual Journey (1997), and Now is the Hour of Her Return: Poems in Praise of the Divine Mother Kali (2022). He also teaches classes and workshops in writing haiku.

== Personal life ==
Strand lives in Woodstock, New York. He and his wife, author Perdita Finn, are co-founders of The Way of the Rose, a non-sectarian rosary fellowship that welcomes people of all faiths and spiritual backgrounds.

== Bibliography ==
1997	Seeds from a Birch Tree: Writing Haiku and the Spiritual Journey	ISBN 978-0-7868-6242-9
1998	The Wooden Bowl: Simple Meditations for Everyday Life	ISBN 978-0-7868-6286-3
2003	Meditation Without Gurus: A Guide to the Heart of the Practice	ISBN 978-1-893361-93-5
2009	How to Believe in God: Whether You Believe in Religion or Not	ISBN 978-0-7679-2069-8
2014	Waking the Buddha: How the Most Dynamic and Empowering Buddhist Movement in History Is Changing Our Concept of Religion	ISBN 978-0977924561
2015	Waking up to the Dark: Ancient Wisdom for a Sleepless Age	ISBN 978-0-8129-9772-9
2019	The Way of the Rose: The Radical Path of the Divine Feminine Hidden in the Rosary (with Perdita Finn)	ISBN 978-0812988956
2022	Now is the Hour of Her Return: Poems in Praise of the Divine Mother Kali	ISBN 9781948626750
