= Trashcan Sinatras =

Scottish band

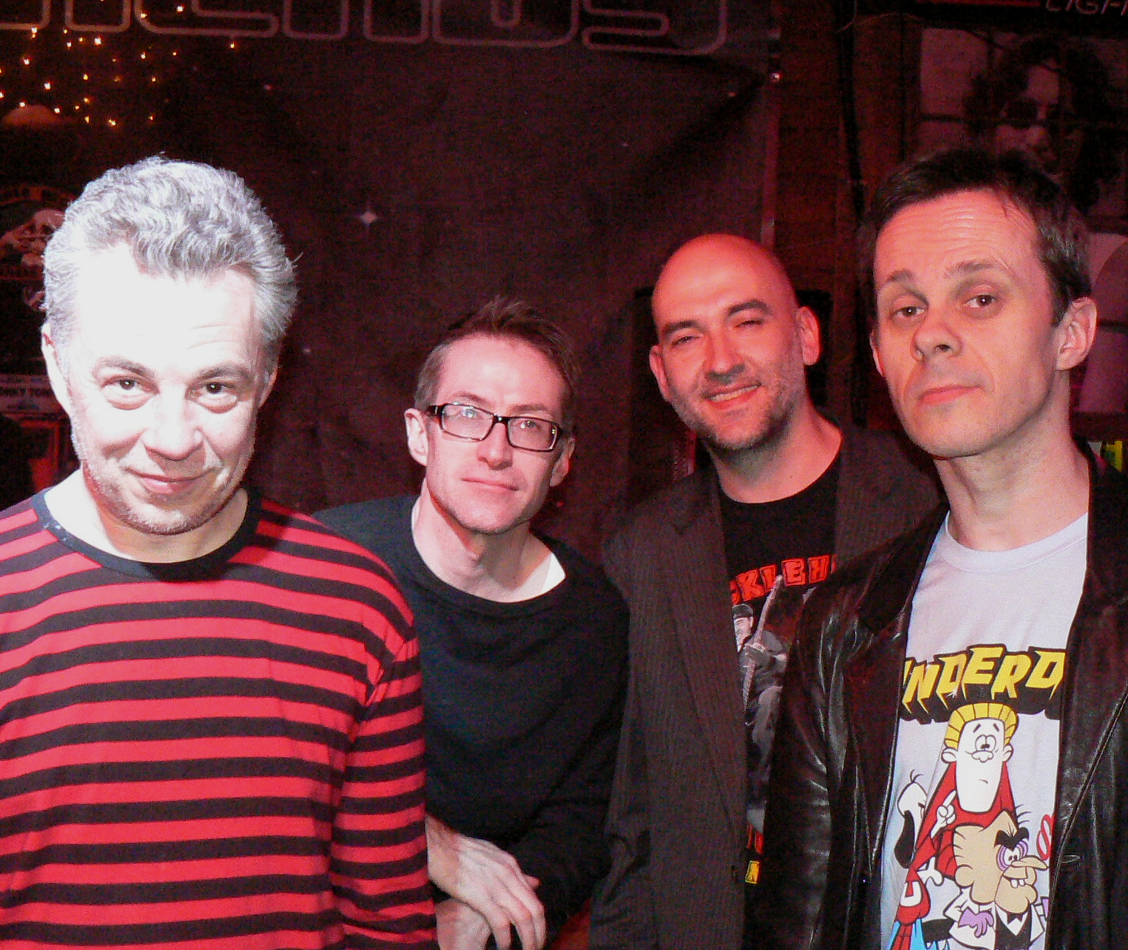
- The band in March 2011

Background information
- Origin: Irvine, Ayrshire, Scotland
- Genres: Alternative rock; indie pop
- Years active: 1986–present
- Labels: Lo-Five (UK, North America: current); JVC (Japan 2006–current); Picnic (UK: 2004–2007); Go! Discs (UK: 1989–1996); spinART (US: 2004); London (US: 1990–1993); Avex (Japan: 2004–2006); Sony Japan (1999)
- Members: Francis Reader; Paul Livingston; Stephen Douglas; Davy Hughes
- Past members: George McDaid: John Douglas
- Website: trashcansinatras.com

Trashcan Sinatras are a Scottish indie rock band that were formed in Irvine, Scotland in 1986. The band's music makes frequent use of pop harmonies and wordplay.

== History ==
=== Formation ===
The band members met through the club/pub music scene in Irvine. The original band members included Frank Reader (bass), Davy Hughes (guitar and vocals), George McDaid (guitar) and Paul Forde (drums).

By late 1986, the line-up had changed to include Paul Livingston (guitar), John Douglas (guitar) and Stephen Douglas (drums), along with Frank Reader moving to vocals and Davy Hughes to bass. While the band has included other members for short periods of time over the years, this is the line-up that would record the bulk of the Trashcan Sinatras' music to date.

=== Cake era ===
The band was spotted by Simon Dine in 1987 and quickly signed to Go! Discs. Using their signing advance, the band purchased a recording studio in Kilmarnock, naming it Shabby Road. Work began on their debut album, which was eventually released in 1990. Cake featured the band's largest worldwide hit single, "Obscurity Knocks" as well as a couple of other alternative music hits ("Only Tongue Can Tell" and "Circling the Circumference"). The band were often compared to The Smiths and the success of Cake in the United States, where it spent three months in the Billboard 200, led to extensive touring in both the UK and North America in support of the album.

=== I've Seen Everything era ===
The follow-up record, I've Seen Everything was released in 1993. The song "Hayfever" made an appearance on the MTV animated series, Beavis and Butt-head. The band released two singles ("Hayfever" and "I've Seen Everything") and toured the UK, North America and Japan in support of the album.

=== A Happy Pocket era ===
The band's third album, A Happy Pocket, followed in 1996. AHP was released in the UK and Japan, but was unavailable in the U.S. after the band's American distributor declined to release the record. The band released four singles from AHP ("The Main Attraction", "Twisted and Bent", "How Can I Apply...?" and "To Sir, With Love", the latter a cover of the 1967 Lulu U.S. number one hit). The Trashcans did not tour in North America, only the UK and Japan.

Their record label, Go! Discs, had made a successful short film for the band Portishead and greenlit the production of Spooktime, a film of stories based on characters from The Trashcans' lyrics. The 15-minute film was to be shown in cinemas before screenings of Terry Gilliam's 12 Monkeys.

After their record company Go! Discs was acquired by Universal in 1996, the band was dropped from the label and subsequently forced to sell their Shabby Road recording studio and declare bankruptcy. The Trashcans kept a low profile in the following years, not playing any concerts until early 1999 (in Japan and Ireland). The Japanese concerts occurred at the same time the band was recording a new single, "Snow" (a cover of the Randy Newman song), which was released by Sony Japan in December 1999.

=== Weightlifting era ===
In March 2000, the band set up camp in Hartford, Connecticut to record their fourth album. Between March and June, the band recorded around a dozen songs and played a handful of shows in the northeastern United States, their first shows in America since 1993. After returning to Scotland, the band decided to scrap the album.

The band only performed four concerts in the UK in 2001. Instead they focused on writing additional songs and recording demos for their fourth album. In March 2002, recording began at Riverside Studios in Glasgow. The band recorded a dozen songs on and off over the course of a year. In 2003, the band started to raise its profile by playing concerts and festivals in Scotland. They hired New York City based record producer and musician Andy Chase (of the band Ivy) to mix the new album tracks, which was completed by the end of the year.

With a new album ready for release, the Trashcans stepped up their activity in 2004. The band played in Spain and London, before heading to the United States in March. They appeared on the Morning Becomes Eclectic radio show with Nic Harcourt in March, the day of their sold out show at the Troubadour in Los Angeles California (their first appearance on the west coast of the U.S. in 11 years). From there, the band headed off to Austin, Texas for five appearances at the South by Southwest music festival. The Trashcans garnered quite a bit of press (Billboard staffers named the Trashcans one of the top 10 acts at SXSW) and record label attention.. which led to a licensing deal with New York-based spinART Records.

The Trashcan Sinatras finally released their fourth album in August 2004. Weightlifting was warmly received by critics and the band completed a 25 date U.S. and Canada tour in September and October 2004. They had follow up U.S. tours in December 2004 and in April and May 2005, while also extensively touring Scotland, England, Ireland, Japan and Australia during 2004–2006. The Weightlifting album included the song "All the Dark Horses", which was featured prominently in the first episode of the ABC Family Channel series Wildfire.

=== In the Music era ===
The band's fifth studio album, In the Music, was recorded with producer Andy Chase between November 2007 and February 2008, at Stratosphere Sound in New York and in Martha's Vineyard. In July 2008, Carly Simon recorded backing vocals for the song "Should I Pray?"

The single "Oranges and Apples" was released as a download-only single on 13 October 2008. The song was inspired by Syd Barrett, one of the founding members of Pink Floyd. The single was released in connection with The City Wakes, a festival in tribute to Syd Barrett that took place in Cambridge and London in October 2008.

The album was released (with bonus track "Astronomy") in Japan on 22 April 2009 (on Victor Entertainment), in the United Kingdom on 14 September 2009 (on Lo-Five Records) and 27 April 2010 in North America (also on Lo-Five Records, with digital distribution by Ingrooves and physical distribution by Fontana Distribution). The North American release includes eight live bonus tracks, which are live acoustic recordings taken from the band's November 2009 UK tour. Lo-Five also released a limited, numbered deluxe edition of the album in July 2009, which featured two additional bonus tracks ("I Can't Stand Tomorrow" and "I Just Don't Know How") and an in-depth booklet of liner notes, photos and a listing of everyone who pre-ordered the release.

The album received strong reviews from print and online media with The Guardian describing it as "Gentle, grown-up popcraft that reveals more with each listen", and the BBC calling it "tender, affecting music which impresses with increasing listens."

The band supported the 2009 album release with nearly 40 concerts and promotional appearances in the United States, Japan and the United Kingdom between July and November 2009, and with a follow-up tour of Japan in March 2010. On the follow-up Japanese tour, the band was supported by Japanese act Sunny Day Service, with whom they also recorded and released English-language and Japanese-language versions of the single "Town Foxes/yume iro no machide". The band also completed an 11 date USA promotional tour in June 2010.

A live acoustic album Brel (recorded in Glasgow in 2009), a follow up to the band's 2005's acoustic live Fez (recorded in New York City). Brel was released on 9 November 2010. This was set to be followed by the release of Earlies... a 4 album box set marking the 20th anniversary of the release of Cake, comprising the 3 Go!Discs albums and Weightlifting, digitally remastered with additional tracks and packaging including mementos reflecting the band's distinguished career. However, to date Earlies... has not been released.

=== Wild Pendulum era ===
In October 2014 the band announced through social media that it would begin recording its sixth album in the coming months and offered fans the opportunity to pre-order it through PledgeMusic with a series of "exclusives" offering unique content, merchandise and updates throughout the recording process. On 21 October 2015, the first track, "Best Days On Earth," was released to the band's PledgeMusic supporters in a project update on the site. In the same update, the band confirmed that the new album would be titled "Wild Pendulum."

In an August 2015 project update, the band announced that the new album would be released in January 2016. A second track, "Ain't That Something," was later released to PledgeMusic supporters, and the album's release was pushed back. On a 1 March 2016 project update, the band announced that a digital download of the complete album would be made available to supporters on 22 April 2016, with the album's release on physical CDs and vinyl to follow.

Following another hiatus the band released the song "The Closer You Move Away From Me" digitally on 22 May 2020.It was later released physically as a limited-edition double A-side 7inch vinyl single alongside the song "Ways".

This was followed up by an EP on 25 November 2022 containing the tracks "Lay of the Land", "There's a Shadow", "A Stone's Throw from Paradise" and "The Midas Touch".

=== Ever The Optimist era ===
On July 31, 2026 the band released their first album for ten years across a variety of streaming platforms. The album "Ever The Optimist" had been teased over several months with a number of singles including "The Bitter End", "Bad Husband", "Melodramatic" and "Games for the ZX Spectrum". The LP featured guest appearances from Tracyanne Campbell of Camera Obscura and Green Gartside of Scritti Politti. It was also released on several vinyl formats, as well as CD, with some limited edition versions containing a 7" single with extra tracks "A Bewildering And Implacable Fear" and "Bad Husband (Clouds Mix)". John Douglas died three days after the release of Ever The Optimist "after a short, sudden illness".

== Other activity ==
In 1996, the band contributed a cover version of the Smiths' "I Know It's Over" to the tribute compilation The Smiths Is Dead.

In 1998, the band recorded a song "Duty Free" under the pseudonym The Cat Protection League. The song was included on a compilation of local Kilmarnock/Irvine-area artists as part of a university music class project.

John Douglas wrote "Wild Mountainside", which was recorded by Eddi Reader for her 2003 album Eddi Reader Sings the Songs of Robert Burns. This song was later recorded by the Trashcans and released as an EP in 2005. John Douglas wrote two songs, "Should I Pray?" and "Prisons", which appear on Eddi Reader's 2007 album Peacetime. The Trashcans have also recorded these songs for In the Music. In 2013, Douglas and Reader were married, shortly after which he was diagnosed with the autoimmune disease, ulcerative colitis, which necessitated surgery and a lengthy convalescence.

In 2006, Francis Reader sang a cover of the Beatles' "Got To Get You into My Life", which was featured in an advertisement campaign for the U.S. telecommunications company Qwest Communications. Reader also contributed vocals in 2007 to Kevin Ayers' album The Unfairground.

The band collaborated with writer Ali Smith on the song "Half an Apple", for the album Ballads of the Book, released in March 2007.

For the start of their 2010 tour, the Trashcan Sinatras played in Mike Chandler's Portland OR living room. This was billed as an experimental show and gained much media attention with stories in USA Today, Wired Magazine's blog The Underwire, FOX News and The Oregonian. Tickets sold out in less than 36 hours, purchased by 50 fans who traveled from all over the west coast. The band played for three hours and over 30 songs with several songs seldom heard live over the past 20 years.

In 2010 the Trashcan Sinatras recorded a version of the Beatles song "Hello, Goodbye" for use in a promotional video campaign by Narita Airport in Japan. The video is expected to run in the airport, on board aircraft, and on Japanese media for at least one year.

In 2018 and 2019, the band completed three-piece acoustic tours of North America. The 2018 tour featured songs from Cake and I’ve Seen Everything. The 2019 tour featured songs from A Happy Pocket and Weightlifting.

== Members ==
- Stephen Douglas – drums, vocals
- Francis Reader – vocals, acoustic guitar
- Paul Livingston – lead guitar
- Davy Hughes – bass

John Douglas – rhythm guitar, vocals (1986–2026; his death)

Trashcan Sinatras on stage at The Saint in Asbury Park, New Jersey (September 2017)

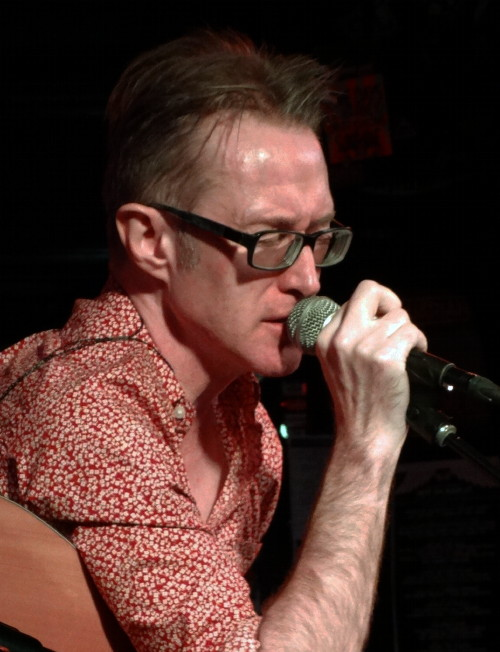
Francis Reader

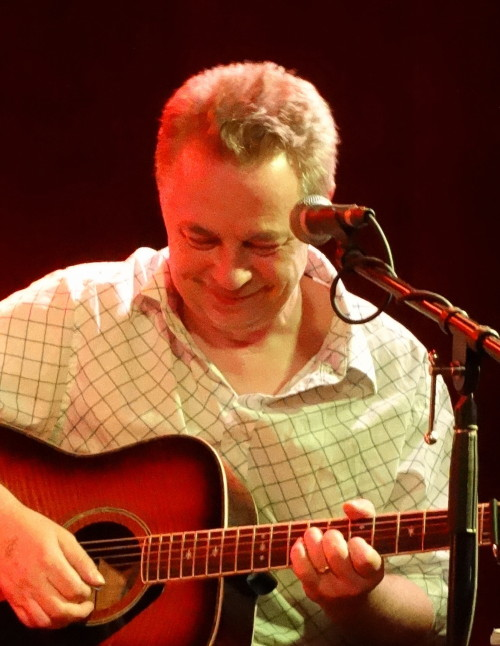
John Douglas

=== Session/touring members ===
- Frank DiVanna – bass (2009–2016)
- Stevie Mulhearn – keyboards (1998–2000, 2006–2016)
- Roddy Hart – keyboards, acoustic guitar (2003–2005)
- Jody Stoddart – guitar (2007)
- Grant Wilson – bass (1998–2000, 2002–2003, 2006–2008)

=== Former members ===
- George McDaid – bass (1986, 1989–1991)

== Discography ==
=== Albums ===
List of albums, with selected peak chart positions
Year	Title	Chart positions	
Year	Title	UK	US
1990	Cake	55	131
1993	I've Seen Everything	50	—
1996	A Happy Pocket	77	—
2004	On a B Road – B Sides and Cover Songs	—	—
2004	Weightlifting	—	—
2009	In the Music	—	—
2016	Wild Pendulum	—	—
2018	All Night in America (live)	—	—
2026	Ever the Optimist	—	—

=== Singles and EPs ===
List of singles and EPs, with selected peak chart positions
Year	Title	Chart positions		Album
Year	Title	UK	US Alt.	Album
1990	"Obscurity Knocks"	86	12	Cake
1990	"Only Tongue Can Tell"	77	8	Cake
1990	"Circling the Circumference"	—	—	Cake
1993	"Hayfever"	61	11	I've Seen Everything
1993	"I've Seen Everything"	83	—	I've Seen Everything
1993	"Bloodrush" (promo only)	—	—	I've Seen Everything
1995	"The Genius I Was" (promo only)	—	—	A Happy Pocket
1996	"The Main Attraction"	182	—	A Happy Pocket
1996	"Twisted and Bent"	121	—	A Happy Pocket
1996	"How Can I Apply...?"	172	—	A Happy Pocket
1996	"To Sir, with Love"	88	—	A Happy Pocket
1999	Snow EP	—	—	–
2004	"Welcome Back" (promo only)	—	—	Weightlifting
2005	"All the Dark Horses"	—	—	Weightlifting
2005	"Wild Mountainside"	—	—	–
2008	"Oranges and Apples" (digital download)	—	—	In the Music
2015	"Best Days on Earth"	—	—	Wild Pendulum
2015	"Ain't That Something"	—	—	Wild Pendulum
2020	"The Closer You Move Away from Me"	—	—	–
2020	"Ways"	—	—	–
2026	"The Bitter End"	—	—	Ever The Optimist
2026	"Bad Husband"	—	—	Ever The Optimist
2026	"Melodramatic"	—	—	Ever The Optimist
2026	"Games for the ZX Spectrum"	—	—	Ever The Optimist

=== Other releases ===
- Senses Working Overtime (1992)
- Zebra of the Family (demos/alternate takes/unreleased songs) (2003)
- Fez (live – unplugged) (2005)
- Midnight at the Troubadour (DVD) (2006)
- Live Series Radio Sessions Volume 1 (2009)
- Live Series Radio Sessions Volume 2 (2010)
- Brel (2011)
