= Clark Gibson =

American political scientist

Clark C. Gibson is an American political scientist, best known for his work on African politics, elections in emerging democracies, and environmental politics. Gibson is currently a professor at the University of California, San Diego, where he previously served as chairman of the Department of Political Science. He has consulted for The World Bank, The United Nations, the Carter Center, the United States Agency for International Development, the National Democratic Institute, and the International Republican Institute. Gibson has done influential work on electoral fraud.

Gibson graduated with a bachelor's degree from the University of Notre Dame, then joined the Peace Corps, serving in Nepal. Gibson subsequently worked as a paralegal and high school teacher in the Los Angeles area before beginning graduate study in political science at Duke University. While working on his doctoral dissertation, Gibson conducted field work in Zambia, Africa where he studied wildlife politics and poaching in national parks. While in Zambia, Gibson encountered a group of election observers led by Jimmy Carter and became involved in work on election monitoring and electoral fraud, eventually leading to Gibson's work in a variety of countries. Gibson received his Ph.D. from Duke, then held several positions at Indiana University. While at I.U., he worked on common pool resources with political economist Elinor Ostrom PhD at her Workshop in Political Theory and Policy Analysis. Ostrom subsequently won the Nobel Prize in Economics with Oliver E. Williamson for her "analysis of economic governance, especially the commons". In 2001, Gibson joined the Department of Political Science at the University of California, San Diego as a tenured faculty member.

Gibson's academic work has mainly concentrated on issues and countries in Africa. He has undertaken extensive studies on the subjects of foreign aid and political accountability. Most recently, he has worked on using technology, specifically cellphones, to minimize electoral fraud in Afghanistan, Uganda, Kenya, and South Africa. Gibson's work, coauthored with Karen Ferree and James Long, helped to point to discrepancies in the controversial results of 2007 Kenyan elections. Gibson conducted an extensive exit poll in the election on behalf of the International Republican Institute and USAID. After the election poll's results were made available by Gibson, Feree, and Long, the results became subject to controversy due to the International Republican Institute's delay in releasing the poll results. The delay and its impact on public perceptions on the validity of the elections received international press.
