= Clark Smith =

Clark Smith may refer to:

- Clark Allen Smith (1846–1921), Justice of the Kansas Supreme Court
- Clark Ashton Smith (1893–1961), American poet, sculptor, painter and author
- Clark Smith (swimmer) (born 1995), American swimmer
- Clark S. Smith (1912–2014), member of the Pennsylvania House of Representatives
- Clark Robert Smith, innovator in the wine industry
- Clark Smith, former hockey player with the Calgary Hitmen
