= Clark Hallren =

P. Clark Hallren, former Managing Director of the Entertainment Industries Group of JPMorgan Securities, Inc., has played a central role on some of Hollywood's largest entertainment transactions over the years. In 2009, Hallren helped syndicate $325 million in senior debt for Steven Spielberg's DreamWorks SKG - where equity was matched by India's Reliance Anil Dhirubhai Ambani Group.

In August 2009, Hallren exited JPMorgan to become Managing Director of Clear Scope Partners. Clear Scope Partners is an affiliate of Rizvi Traverse Management, a firm which in 2005 acquired 50% of the stock in International Creative Management.

Hallren holds a degree in Finance, Accounting and Economics from Oklahoma State University. He also holds Series 7, 63 and 24 NASD licenses.
