= Clark Stanford =

American dentist

Clark Stanford is an American dentist, focusing restorative dentistry and craniofacial pathobiology, currently the Dean and Professor at the University of Iowa College of Dentistry.

He was UIC Distinguished Professor at University of Illinois at Chicago College of Dentistry.
