= Hay fever weed =

Hay fever weed may refer to:

- Ambrosia artemisiifolia
- Ambrosia trifida
