= Clark Boler =

American football and baseball coach (1942–2013)

Biographical details
- Born: February 26, 1942; Northport, Alabama, U.S.
- Died: November 29, 2013 (aged 71); Marietta, Georgia, U.S.

Playing career

Football
- 1961–1963: Alabama
- Position: Tackle

Coaching career (HC unless noted)

Football
- 1964: Alabama (GA)
- 1968–?: Bloomsburg (DL)
- 1980–1981: Bloomsburg

Baseball
- 1969–1980: Bloomsburg

Head coaching record
- Overall: 1–18 (football); 105–155–2 (baseball)

Rodrick Clark Boler (February 26, 1942 – November 29, 2013) was an American football and baseball coach. He served as the head football coach at the Bloomsburg University of Pennsylvania from 1980 to 1981, compiling a record of 1–18. Boler played college football at the University of Alabama under coach Bear Bryant.

== Head coaching record ==
=== Football ===
Year	Team	Overall	Conference	Standing	Bowl/playoffs
Bloomsburg Huskies (Pennsylvania State Athletic Conference) (1980–1981)
1980	Bloomsburg	1–8	1–4	T–4th (East)	
1981	Bloomsburg	0–10	0–5	6th (East)	
Bloomsburg:		1–18	1–9		
Total:		1–18			
