= Clark Yeager =

American swimming coach

Clark S. Yeager
Biographical details
- Born: circa 1949–50
- Education: Cal State University, Chico (Chico State) B.A. Humanities '71; MA Phys. Ed. '79

Playing career
- 1968–1971: Chico State
- Position: freestyle

Coaching career (HC unless noted)
- 1976–1991: Cal State University, Chico (Chico State)
- 1989–1990: Chico State Assoc. Athletic Director
- 1992–2006: Kutztown University; Coach, Athletic Director; Asst. to Provost
- 2006–2013: Lewis and Clark College; Athletic Director

Head coaching record
- Overall: 125–37 .722 Win % (Chico State)

Accomplishments and honors

Championships
- 13 NCAC Championships (Chico State)

Awards
- 5xNCAC Coach of Year; Chico State Hall of Fame '08; CSCAA Coach of the Century '18

Clark S. Yeager (born circa 1949) was an American swimming coach and Athletics Director who swam for California State University, Chico, also known as Chico State, and coached swimming at Chico State from 1976–1991, leading the team to 13 College Championships in the Northern California Athletic Conference (NCAC). He would later serve as a coach and Athletic Director for Kutztown University of Pennsylvania and as an Athletic Director for Portland, Oregon's Lewis and Clark College.

Born around 1949, Yeager attended San Bernardino's San Gorgonio High School where he was Captain of the Swim team in 1967. In that year he was also elected Director of Finance for Gorgonio High. Yeager swam for the strong program at San Bernardino Valley Swim Club under Coach George Weiny, where he helped the team win the San Bernardino's Apple Valley Relays, its fourth straight title, in July 1968. Yeager competed with the Open 400 freestyle relay team which swam a combined time of 3:29.4, a conference record. Swimming for the San Bernardino Valley Swim Club in August 1966, he swam on the winning 200 freestyle relay team in the 15–17 age group. In December 1966, as a multi-sport athlete, Yeager was recognized as a Most Valuable Player on San Gorgornio High's Class B football team serving as a Captain and playing linebacker-tackle.

== Swimming for Chico State ==
Yeager attended and swam for Chico State University beginning in the Fall of 1967. He swam under Hall of Fame Coach Ernie Maglischo from 1968–1971, receiving his BA in June 1971 in Humanities with a minor in Physical Education. Swimming as an underclassman, in the 1968–69 season, Chico State had a conference record of 5–2, and finished second in the Far Western Conference championships though Yeager did not place in the championship meet. During his time at the University, he earned varsity letters in swimming in 1968, 1969, and 1971. In 1971, Yeager coached Bernardino's Arrowhead swimming team, leading them to finish third in the Eastern Division of the Sunkist league, and helped supervise a few of their meets. He would later complete his Masters from Chico State in 1979 earning a 3.97 Grade Point Average while serving as their swim coach.

== Coaching and directing athletics ==
=== Chico State University ===
Replacing Hall of Fame Coach Dr. Ernest Maglischo, Yeager coached the Men's team at Chico State from 1976–1991 and served as the Athletic Director in an interim position from 1989–1990. During his tenure at Chico State from 1976–1991, he led the Wildcats to 13 team championships in the Northern California Athletic Conference (NCAC) and earned a dual meet record of 125–37. Also achieving on the national stage during his coaching tenure, he had 15 NCAA finishes within the top ten. Nineteen of Yeager's swimmers earned individual titles in NCAA competition, and he coached two hundred All Americans. In another distinction, Yeager had a 45–0 conference record in dual meets while at Chico State. While at Chico State, Yeager was voted a Coach of the year by the Northern California Athletic Conference five times. The swim program at Chico State was discontinued in 1991. In 1983 and 1989, Chico State held the National Swimming Championships for Division II NCAA, when Yeager was serving both as Coach and as Director of Athletics in 1989.

=== Kutztown, Lewis and Clark, 1992–2013 ===
Yeager coached and served as an Athletic Director at Kutztown University of Pennsylvania from March, 1992–2006, where he helped lead the team to prominence in their conference. As a Director at Kutztown, Yeager helped the Kutztown Golden Bear athletic teams win 33 division, conference, and regional titles. In his late career, from around July 1, 2006 – 2013, Yeager worked as a Director of Athletics at Portland, Oregon's Lewis and Clark College, living in Lake Oswego, Oregon before retiring around 2013. At Lewis and Clark, Yeager supervised a multi-million dollar department with 22 intercollegiate athletic teams, a cheer team, recreational sports, and numerous athletic facilities.

== Service to the swimming community ==
In 1998, Yeager chaired the of NCAA Rules Committee for Division II swimming. After 1989, he served as a member of the National Association of College Directors in Athletics. He was a National Association of Development Directors (NADD) member after 1994. After 1974, he was a member of both the College Swimming Coaches Association (CSCAA) and the American Swimming Coaches Association (ASCA).

As a Senior, Yeager continued to swim, and trained intermittently with United States Masters Swimming. From 2013–2023 he competed in several masters meets in Southern California, and in 2014 in the Portland area, while specializing in short distance breast and butterfly events.

Clark and his wife Ingrid have had three children, Joleen, Zachory, and Christopher.

== Honors ==
Yeager was inducted into the Chico State Hall of Fame in 2008, and became a member of the Chico (city) Hall of Fame in 2018. After working as a swimming administrator, including chairing the NCAA Rule Committee, Yeager was inducted into the College Swimming & Diving Coaches Association of America's (CSCAA) Greatest Coaches of the Century in September 2018.
