= J. C. Scarff =

American football coach

Coaching career (HC unless noted)
- 1896: Cedarville

Head coaching record
- Overall: 6–0–2

J. C. Scarff was an American football coach. He was the first head football coach at the Cedarville University. He coached for the 1896 season only and compiled an undefeated 6–0–2 record.

== Head coaching record ==
Year	Team	Overall	Conference	Standing	Bowl/playoffs
Cedarville Yellow Jackets (Independent) (1896)
1896	Cedarville	6–0–2			
Cedarville:		6–0–2			
Total:		6–0–2			
