= Clark L. Wilson =

American industrial psychologist

Clark L. Wilson (August 31, 1913 – August 12, 2006 in Winchester, Virginia) was an American industrial psychologist who introduced the concept of 360 feedback surveys for management training and development applications. From 1970-1973 he developed his first 360-degree feedback survey, the "Survey of Management Practices". It was based on a learning sequence he called the Task-Cycle-Theory. Today, 360 feedback surveys of many types are standard tools for management training and development worldwide.

== Background ==
Wilson studied under psychologist J.P. Guilford as a University of Southern California graduate student after World War II. Guilford had expanded on the work by Louis Leon Thurstone, pioneer in the field of psychometrics, by using factor analysis to assess management skills. Guilford’s work led Wilson to experiment with identifying important management and leadership skills through psychometrics. He eventually developed his Task Cycle assessment tools as an application of Guilford’s statistical approach.

Wilson borrowed the concept of multi-rater feedback from the field of psychological assessment, particularly as it was being applied by the US Army during World War II. Managers and leaders, he believed, could learn and improve if they knew how others perceived their skills and behaviors. He also believed that management skills can be learned, like any other skill, through a learning sequence. While Wilson started out calling this system multi-level feedback, others eventually dubbed it 360-degree feedback—the name by which it is now best known. It is also sometimes called multi-rater feedback.

=== Early Developments ===
He developed the Survey of Management Practices as a teaching tool for his management classes at the University of Bridgeport (Connecticut) Graduate School of Business, where he was the Warner G. Bradford Professor of Management. He had students use the survey in their workplaces.

The feedback consisted of survey statements which were rated on a seven-point agree/disagree scale. The statements were strictly limited to observations about behaviors such as planning or communications, avoiding aspects of personality such as sociability or excitability. Each individual would rate him or herself on the same survey as the supervisor, direct reports, and peers who were also providing ratings.

By the mid-1970s more companies, including Dow Chemical, Pitney Bowes and several utilities were using the instrument and contributing data to the norm database. With wider use and accumulated data, Wilson was able to study the reliability and validity of the instrument. He also studied performance data on feedback recipients and was able to verify a mathematical basis for the Task Cycle learning sequence. He found that when a manager or executive practiced the Task Cycle skills with balance and in sequence, a measurable increase in effectiveness could be documented.

=== Business ===
The Clark Wilson Group, formed in 1973, merged with TruScore (formerly The Booth Company) in 2017. The Task Cycle® line of assessments now consists of ten off-the-shelf offerings, with dozens of customized versions in circulation.

=== Research Conclusions ===
Up to the time of his death, Wilson continued to develop and publish a full range of assessment tools. He published his last book in 2003 at the age of 89. How and Why Effective Managers Balance Their Skills offers conclusions based on 30 years of research. Wilson summarizes: "After over 30 years of analysis, the problem of most managers is very clear. Too many managers try to exercise control without providing the technical and teambuilding skills needed to achieve their goals". This imbalance derails individuals and undermines organizational performance, he asserted, while the presence of these skills—which can be learned—measurably improves business outcomes.

=== Academic and Professional ===
Clark Wilson received his A.B. from Stanford University in 1935. He joined the U.S. Navy in World War II and served in the submarine force in the Pacific theater and was awarded the Silver Star and Gold Star. He earned a Ph.D. in applied psychology from the University of Southern California in 1948. He was a Fellow of the American Psychological Association and a Fellow of the Society of Industrial and Organizational Psychologists.

Dr. Wilson died in August, 2006.

== Research Articles Based on Task Cycle Surveys ==
- Rosti, Jr., R. T., & Shipper, F.; "A Study of the Impact of Training in a Management Development Program Based on 360 Feedback"; (1998). Journal of Managerial Psychology, 1998, Volume 13, Number 1, pp. 77–89.
- Shipper, F. & Davy, J.; Probing Qualitative 360 Feedback for Insights on Leadership Skills and Performance; (2006, August 11–16). Published in the Proceedings of the Academy of Management, Atlanta, Georgia.
- Shipper, F., Davy, J., Hoffman IV, R. C., & Rotondo, D. M.; A Cross-Culture Study of Managerial Skills, Employees’ Attitudes and Managerial Performance: New Insights or Back to Basics? (2005, August 5–10). Published in the Proceedings of the Academy of Management, Honolulu, Hawaii.
- Shipper, F., Hoffman IV, R. C., & Rotondo, D. M. Does the 360 Feedback Process Create Actionable Knowledge Equally Across Cultures? (2004, August 6–11). Published in the Best Papers Proceedings of the Academy of Management, New Orleans, LA.
- Shipper, F., Kincaid, J., Rotondo, D. M., & Hoffman IV, R. C.; "A Cross-Cultural Exploratory Study of the Link between Emotional Intelligence and Managerial Effectiveness"; (2003). The International Journal of Organizational Analysis, Vol. 11, No. 2, pp. 171–191.
