= Clark Hatch =

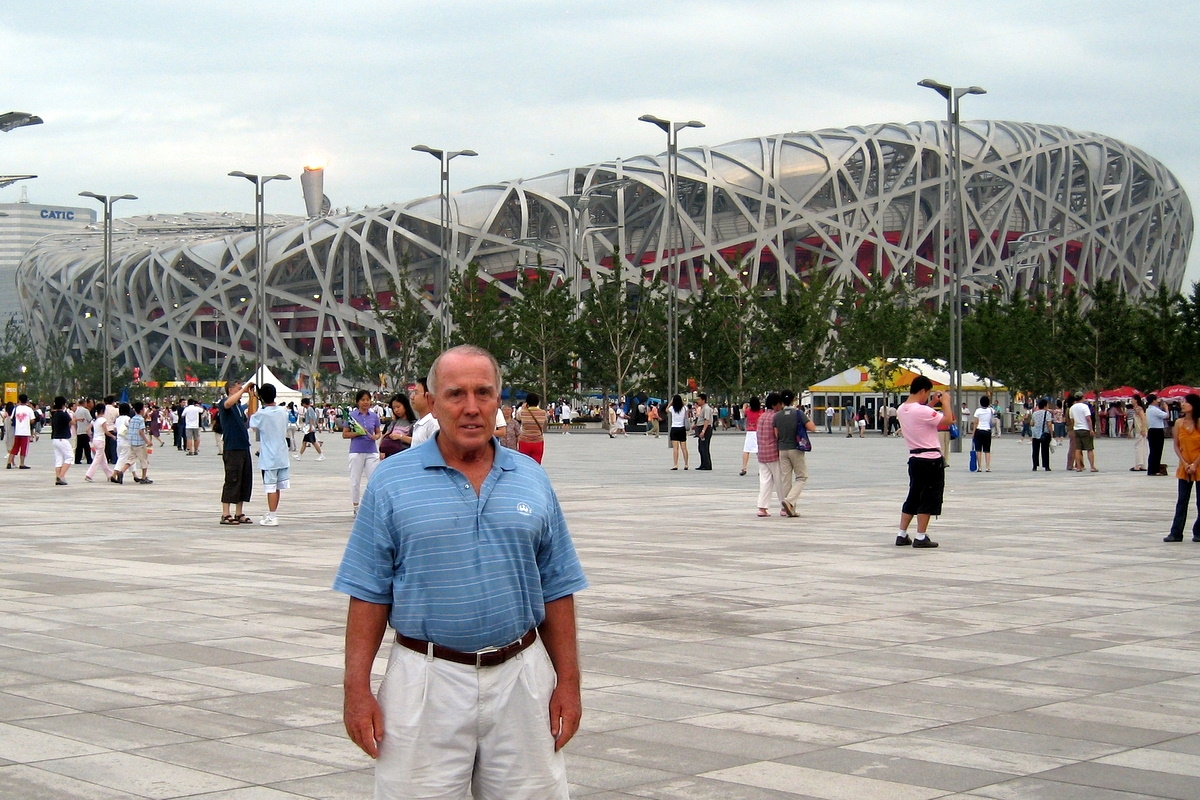
Clark Hatch outside "The Bird's Nest", the main stadium at the 2008 Olympic Games in Beijing.

Clark Hatch is a physical fitness "missionary" who explored Asia, bringing the word on improving health via exercise and nutrition. He has been called "a cross between Marco Polo and Jack LaLanne" by Club Industry Magazine. Starting in 1965, Hatch opened fitness centers in 14 Far East countries, usually the first such facility in each nation, and then expanded into Australia, India, the Middle East and the United States, for a final total of 120. Now retired, he oversees an active organization of 41 centers from Honolulu to Kathmandu. Over the past 45 years he estimates he has helped some one million men and women along the path to fitness and improved health.

== Business career ==
Hatch's formula for success was to partner with five-star hotels as they opened in Asian capitals, install a modern exercise facility, staff it with trained managers and develop two revenue streams: paid memberships from among the local business and diplomatic community and day use by guests of the hotel. This system showed consistent profits as he continued to expand into new territories including Vietnam, Cambodia and Nepal. Currently, there are 41 active centers in nine Asian countries plus Hawaii and Guam

== Books ==
In 1970, he wrote his first two books: Physical Fitness: A Practical Way, published by Charles Tuttle, and Taikaku Kaizen Training-ho (Training Method to Improve Physique) together with "Mr. Japan" Mitsuo Endo. Hatch's third book, Clark Hatch Fitness Centers Instructors Manual, was first printed in 1974 and, updated periodically, is still in use at all Clark Hatch Fitness Centers. His fourth book, Clark Hatch: Fitness Ambassador to Asia, an illustrated autobiographical account of his 40-year business adventure and success, was published in the U.S. and in China in May, 2010.

== Awards ==
Mayor's Award, Seoul, Korea, 1975, Plaque of Appreciation
Certificate of Merit, Honolulu, Hawaii City Council, March 23, 1978
Governor's Commendation, Honolulu, Hawaii, March 6, 1999

== Press coverage ==
Vivienne Kenrick, "Clark Hatch" (personality profile), Japan Times, July 7, 1965
Mas Manbo, "Times at Bat", Japan Times, November 6, 1965
"Clark Hatch Physical Fitness Center", Mianichi Daily News (Japan), December 4, 1966
Marsha Prysuska, "This Is Hong Kong", Hong Kong Standard, March 19, 1975, (p. 5)
"New ownership", Amfac Center Newsletter, December 1, 1976 (cover story)
Ken Jalleh Jr., "Hatch has challenge for the fit", Straits Times (Singapore), October 19, 1979,
"Clark Hatch Health Centre opens today", Bangkok Post (Thailand), April 16, 1980
"Hatch Phys. Fitness Center opens", China Post (Taipei), July 10, 1980
Jim Wolf, "Proving a point – with muscles", Bangkok Post (Thailand) February 18, 1981,
"Physical contest held to salvage Asian honor", The Korea Times, February 18, 1981,
Richard Buck, "Clark Hatch says he can save corporate dollars with exercise", Seattle Times, July 5, 1981 (p. B6)
Robert King, "Hatch’s Prescription for Keeping Fit in Asia", Asian Wall Street Journal, March 12, 1982
"U.S.-style fitness centers in Asia", Fortune, December 27, 1982 (p. 11)
Kit Bauman, “Adolphus imports well-known Pacific health club”, Dallas Downtown News, April 11–17, 1983
Pamela Lechtman, "Fitness Is Portable!", Shape magazine, November 1983
"Demand rights for pure air, non-smokers", Bangkok Post, August 14, 1984
Singapore Business, August 1984, (p. 65) "Clark is hatching more centres"
Al Watts, "No-nonsense fitness proves Hatch’s forte", Pacific Business News, February 6, 1984 (p. 5)
"On the Road", review of Dallas Clark Hatch Center, Fortune, April 2, 1984 (p. 100)
"The Hatch Dynasty", Club Industry, November 1987 (7-page cover feature)
Patrick Killen, "Clark Hatch Makes Fitness Respectable", Daily Yomiuri, February 5, 1991 (p. A9)
Yeo Hwee Yng, "Fitness staff pass pinch test with flying colors", Straits Times (Singapore), May 25, 1993
"Asian Explorer", Club Business International (IHRSA) April 2005 (p. 49)
"Clark Hatch considers public offering to fund expansion", Health Club Management, October 11, 2005,
