= Clark Butler =

American professor of philosophy (born 1944)

- Born: 1944 (age 81–82)

Academic background
- Education: University of Southern California (PhD)
- Thesis: Negative Feedback and the Dialectic of Hegel (1970)
- Doctoral advisor: Dallas Willard

Academic work
- Era: Contemporary philosophy
- Region: Western philosophy
- School or tradition: German Idealism
- Institutions: Purdue University

Clark Butler (born 1944) is an emeritus professor of philosophy at Purdue University.

== Life and work ==
Clark Butler earned his high school diploma from Hollywood High School in Los Angeles, California, in January 1962. That same year, he studied at the American University in Cairo in the spring and attended a summer course at the University of Strasbourg in France. He received a French Certificat d’études supérieures in philosophy and logic from the University of Tunis in 1964–65. He completed a B.A. in philosophy at the University of Southern California in August 1966 and went on to earn a Ph.D. in philosophy from the same institution in August 1970.

=== Publications ===
==== Books ====
- The Dialectical Method: A Treatise Hegel Never Wrote. Bloomsbury Academic. 20 December 2011. ISBN 978-1-61614-489-0.
- Lectures on Logic. Indiana University Press. 2 July 2008. ISBN 978-0-253-35167-8.
- Hegel's Logic: Between Dialectic and History. Northwestern University Press. 18 December 1996. ISBN 978-0-8101-1426-5.
- Hegel, the Letters. Indiana University Press. 1984. ISBN 978-0-253-32715-4.
- G.W.F. Hegel. 1977.

==== Articles ====
- Butler, Clark (1976). "Hegel and Freud: A Comparison". Philosophy and Phenomenological Research. 36 (4): 506–522. doi:10.2307/2106868. JSTOR 2106868.
