= Clark Murray =

American sculptor (1937–2022)

Clark Murray, Untitled , painted steel, 1974-75, Museum of Fine Arts, Houston

Clark Murray (September 17, 1937 – October 29, 2022) was an American sculptor who is best known for his large outdoor constructions of welded and painted steel pipes.

Murray died on October 29, 2022, at the age of 85.

Sculptures by Clark Murray include:

- White Mountains, a 1977 three-ton welded steel pipe sculpture was on loan for a brief time beginning in 1982 at the Laumeier Sculpture Park (St. Louis, Missouri. Its current location is unknown.
- A 1973 untitled painted steel pipe sculpture at the University of St. Thomas (Houston, Texas) owned by the Menil Collection
- A 1974-5 untitled painted steel sculpture at the Museum of Fine Arts, Houston (Houston, Texas)

Daughter Kassondra Leigh Murray Golden 100% from three point range
