= Ward Scarff =

Australian cricketer (born 1957)

Personal information
- Full name: Ward Randal Scarff
- Born: 17 February 1957 (age 69); Perth, Western Australia, Australia
- Batting: Left-handed
- Bowling: Slow left-arm orthodox

Domestic team information
- Years: Team
- 1981: Scotland

Career statistics
Competition	List A
Matches	4
Runs scored	63
Batting average	15.75
100s/50s	–/–
Top score	28
Balls bowled	216
Wickets	2
Bowling average	59.00
5 wickets in innings	–
10 wickets in match	–
Best bowling	1/17
Catches/stumpings	1/–
- Source: Cricinfo, 28 October 2022

Ward Randal Scarff (born 17 February 1957) is an Australian former cricketer.

Scarff was born at Perth in February 1957. Having represented Western Australia at colt level, he later played club cricket in Scotland for Greenock. Strong performances for Greenock led to his selection for Scotland in the 1981 Benson & Hedges Cup, with Scarff making four appearances against Lancashire, Derbyshire, Yorkshire, and Warwickshire. Playing as an opening batsman in the Scottish side, he scored 63 runs in his four matches at an average of 15.75, with a highest score of 28. With his slow left-arm orthodox bowling, he took 2 wickets.
