= Clark Scarff =

Australian cricketer

Personal information
- Full name: Clark Steven Scarff
- Born: 19 November 1948 (age 77); Subiaco, Western Australia
- Batting: Right-handed
- Role: Batsman

Domestic team information
- Years: Team
- 1970: Western Australia

Career statistics
Competition	First-class
Matches	4
Runs scored	165
Batting average	27.50
100s/50s	0/1
Top score	67
Catches/stumpings	0/–
- Source: CricketArchive, 13 December 2012

Clark Steven Scarff (born 19 November 1948) is a former Australian cricketer who played four first-class matches for Western Australia across two seasons, 1969–70 and 1970-71. From Perth, Scarff made his first-class debut in a Sheffield Shield match against Victoria in February 1970, the last match of the 1969–70 season. Batting third behind Derek Chadwick and Terry Prindiville, he scored a half-century—67 runs—on debut, featuring in a 131-run partnership with Chadwick for the second wicket. Scarff's three other first-class matches came early in the following Sheffield Shield season. Elevated to the opening position with Chadwick, he failed to score heavily, and did not play at state level again. At grade cricket level, Scarff played for Melville, and served as the club's captain-coach for the 1974–75 season. After retiring from playing, he worked for a time as a financial planner, and later moved to Geraldton, where he opened a management training and consulting firm.
