= Clark Havighurst =

American legal scholar

Clark Havighurst (born May 25, 1933) is an American legal scholar known for his contributions in health care law and policy. He retired in 2005 as the William Neal Reynolds Professor Emeritus of Law at Duke University after forty years of service in its School of Law. Among his contributions was an early casebook in the field, Health Care Law and Policy: Readings, Notes, and Questions (Foundation Press), first published in 1988, with a later edition (with two co-editors) following in 1998. A 1982 book, Deregulating the Health Care Industry: Planning for Competition, examined the case for and against economic regulation in health care markets. Perhaps his most original work was Health Care Choices: Private Contracts as Instruments of Health Reform (published by the American Enterprise Institute in 1995).

== Early life and education ==
Havighurst was born in Evanston, Illinois, on May 25, 1933, to Harold Canfield and Marion Perryman Havighurst. Harold Havighurst was a law professor at Northwestern University School of Law and served as its dean from 1947 to 1957. Clark Havighurst graduated magna cum laude from Princeton University in 1955, where his senior thesis in English was titled The South and Robert Penn Warren: A Study of Regional Influence in Modern Fiction.

He earned his law degree in 1958 (Order of the Coif) from Northwestern, which law school he attended, for family reasons, during his father's deanship (instead of the University of Michigan).

== Early career and family ==
Havighurst's legal career began in 1958, with the relatively young New York law firm now named Debevoise & Plimpton. However, he was quickly drafted into the U.S. Army in December 1958, serving as a legal clerk due to a lower-back condition that precluded officer status. After 19 months of active service, the Army granted him an early release to accept a one-year position as a research associate at Duke Law School. After that introduction to the South, North Carolina, Durham and Duke, he returned to New York and the Debevoise firm in June 1961. In 1964, he accepted Duke's invitation to join its law faculty.

During those three New York years, Havighurst met Karen Waldron, whom he married in 1965. They have two children.

== Academic career ==
In his early years at Duke, Havighurst was for a time the faculty editor of Law and Contemporary Problems, a symposium-oriented journal founded at Duke in 1933. Fortuitously, that editorship contributed to his obtaining in the late 1960s a long-running (until the early 1980s) government contract to develop health care law as a scholarly field, which he did by persuading a number of national luminaries to join a “Committee on Legal Issues in Health Care.” Those associations, that work, and the availability of “L&CP” to publish relevant symposia helped to foster the growth of interdisciplinary scholarship in health care law and policy.

Havighurst's own work in health care law soon led to several high-profile opportunities, including sabbatical leaves first as scholar-in-residence at the Institute of Medicine of the National Academy of Sciences in 1972-73 (its inaugural year); at the Federal Trade Commission in 1978–79; at a Washington law firm in 1988–89, and at the Rand Corporation in Santa Monica in 1999. He was also elected to membership in the Institute of Medicine in 1982, serving on its Board of Health Care Services from 1987 to 1997; the IOM is now the National Academy of Medicine, where Havighurst is an inactive member because so much of his work, originating in his initial teaching and research interests in antitrust law, has been critical of the medical establishment.

In the early 1980s, Havighurst became Duke's William Neal Reynolds Professor of Law. In 1999, he served briefly as the Law School's Interim Dean.

=== Career highlights ===
After writing very early about health maintenance organizations, Havighurst found an occasion in 1973 to propose a selective "no-fault" system for medical malpractice; although clearly appealing to both consumers and many doctors, this program, while never adopted by statute or contract, was still being discussed seriously in 2005. The obstacle to its adoption appeared to be that the medical profession preferred to address patient safety by prescriptive regulation rather than by incentivizing the prevention of injuries by requiring providers to compensate patients suffering recognizably avoidable ones. Havighurst later observed that doctors could expect to be paid for taking required measures, whereas automatically compensating injured patients would affect their bottom lines.

In 2009, he had occasion to show how the “right” liability rule—strict no-fault liability for injuries caused by defective products—would probably have ameliorated the HIV-AIDS crisis.

In the mid-1970s, Havighurst, whose original legal specialty was antitrust law, wrote a brief that seemed to prompt the Supreme Court to review (and later reverse) a lower-court ruling endorsing implied antitrust exemptions for the so-called “learned professions.” Although the case itself, Goldfarb v. Virginia State Bar, involved only the legal profession, Havighurst's brief reminded the Court that other professions, especially medicine, should not necessarily be immune from antitrust enforcement. According to one source, Justice Blackmun, who was once a lawyer for the Mayo Clinic, supplied the justices with a clerk's memo calling attention to Havighurst's argument, possibly determining the final result. The cited book's index includes references to Havighurst's other engagements with legal, especially antitrust, issues of the early years.

For several years after Goldfarb, Havighurst wrote about the many implications of its holding for the organized medical profession and for regulation in the health care sector. His ultimate concern, however, was not so much specific antitrust violations as the profession's overall stewardship in its controlling role.

This latter conern also prompted Havighurst to question about the prevailing assumption that the medical profession itself establishes sound legal “standards of care,” either by declaring “clinical policies” or by its own, observable custom and practice. Both sources, he observed, are almost certain to incorporate and sanction the cost-increasing influence of “moral hazard”—that is, the temptation for doctors and patients to spend insurers’ money more freely than they would spend their own.

Havighurst's idea, first advanced in consulting with policy experts engaged in developing the Clinton Health Security Act proposal in 1993, was that health plans should use private contracts with providers and consumer/patients to integrate the entire transaction, possibly adopting a less costly, scientifically grounded “standard of care.” In 2013, Wall Street Journal columnist Holman W. Jenkins Jr. cited Havighurst for demonstrating how “Americans end up with a ‘Hobson’s choice’: either coverage for ‘Cadillac’ care or no health coverage at all”; if economizing contracts are feasible (a still open question), consumers may eventually find safe, lower-cost options available.

Havighurst's 1995 book, Health Care Choices, which was prompted in part, though not explicitly, by his work on the Clinton Health Security Act, was a fairly strong endorsement of contracts as “instruments of health reform.” A review by James C. Robinson, then a young business school professor, began by declaring, “Clark Havighurst is a radical. Havighurst was naturally pleased when Robinson won a Nobel Prize in Economics in 2025.

In the 1990s, the medical profession, seeking to prove its commitment to “science” and particularly to evidence of efficacy from controlled clinical trials, undertook to create “clinical practice guidelines,” which Havighurst thought might permit contracts to incorporate elements of cost/benefit analysis.

The guidelines “movement” went nowhere, however, perhaps because professional interests, seeing what Havighurst was up to, preferred to keep costs out of the equation

Havighurst remained actively engaged with health policy scholarship through at least 2011, finally writing two ambitious articles focusing on monopolies and other regressively redistributive features of the health care marketplace. The first of these—both were written with Barak Richman—was entitled "Distributive Injustice(s) in American Health Care" and served as the lengthy lead article in a symposium entitled "Who Pays? Who Benefits? Distributional Issue(s) in Health Care."

The editors’ Foreword was entitled “Health Policy’s Fourth Dimension,” which they identified as “fairness” or “equity,” to supplement the usual themes of “access, cost, and quality.

A key point in this and other of Havighurst's later works was that employers and labor unions both prosper by providing Cadillac-quality health coverage to their workers without letting the latter know that they bear a significant share of its cost in reduced take-home pay and other benefits. In 2018, he published a timely and provocative op-ed in the Wall Street Journal dramatizing there "Health-Care Conspiracy of Silence." No wonder, he thought, that consumers have only Hobson's choices.

Havighurst's other late article, on "The Provider Monopoly Problem in Health Care," emphasized how hospitals bundle their services to hide monopoly's effects while health insurance gives working people deep pockets that steepen demand curves and hence the profitability of the numerous non-profit and other monopolies in health care markets.

== Selected publications ==
=== Books ===
- Havighurst, Clark C. (1998). Health care law and policy: readings, notes and questions. University Casebook Series (2nd ed.). Westbury, NY: The Foundation Pr. ISBN 9781566626170.
- Havighurst, Clark C. (1995). Health care choices: private contracts as instruments of health reform. Washington, D.C: AEI Press for the American Enterprise Institute. ISBN 978-0-8447-3867-3.
- Havighurst, Clark C. (1982). Deregulating the health care industry: planning for competition. Cambridge/Mass: Bailinger. ISBN 978-0-88410-736-1. OCLC 7923842.
- Havighurst, Clark C., ed. (1974). Regulating health facilities construction: proceedings. Washington: American Enterprise Institute for Public Policy Research (published January 1, 1974). p. 314. ISBN 978-0-8447-2044-9.

=== Journals ===
- Havighurst, Clark (1978-05-01). "Professional Restraints on Innovation in Health Care Financing". Duke Law Journal. 27 (2): 303–387. doi:10.2307/1372235. ISSN 0012-7086. JSTOR 1372235.
- Havighurst, Clark C.; Hackbarth, Glenn M. (1979-06-07). "Private Cost Containment". New England Journal of Medicine. 300 (23): 1298–1305. doi:10.1056/NEJM197906073002303. ISSN 0028-4793.
- Havighurst, Clark (1984-01-01). "Doctors and Hospitals: An Antitrust Perspective on Traditional Relationships". Duke Law Journal. 33: 1071–1162. doi:10.2307/1372399. JSTOR 1372399.
- Havighurst, Clark (1986-04-01). "Altering the Applicable Standard of Care". Law and Contemporary Problems. 49 (2): 265–275. doi:10.2307/1191427. ISSN 0023-9186. JSTOR 1191427.
- Havighurst, Clark C. (2003-02-01). "An Apology for Professionalist Regimes". Journal of Health Politics, Policy and Law. 28 (1): 159–164. doi:10.1215/03616878-28-1-159. ISSN 0361-6878.
