= Clark McDougall =

Canadian artist (1921-1980)

- Born: Clark Holmes McDougall; November 21, 1921; St. Thomas, Ontario
- Died: August 17, 1980 (aged 58); St. Thomas, Ontario
- Education: self-taught
- Spouse: Muriel Enid Tidy (m. 1945) (d. 1965)

Clark McDougall (November 21, 1921 – August 17, 1980) was a Canadian painter known for his black enamel style.

== Career ==
Clark McDougall was born in St. Thomas, Ontario and lived and died in the house where he was born at 56 Inkerman Street. When he was 16, he left school, having decided to become an artist. He began by painting watercolour in nearby North Yarmouth. He was self-taught from library books and learned from artists such as the watercolourist in his hometown, William St. Thomas Smith, and Charles Burchfield, whom he visited in Buffalo, New York and who urged him to avoid art school since it would damage what he had as an artist.

In 1950, he traveled to Montreal and Quebec City where he first saw the paintings of Henri Matisse. By 1952–1953, Clark was using ingredients of Fauvism in his work, such as its attention to bright colour. In 1954, McDougall met Clement Greenberg, at a symposium at the Albright-Knox Gallery in Buffalo and Greenberg discussed McDougall's work with him.

A heart attack in 1957 forced McDougall to paint from photographs in his studio. His painting style changed and the use of outlining became important to the design of his work, leading him to develop his black enamel style in 1962. The black outline served as an understructure, uniting his work and emphasizing various parts.

In 1943, he had his first exhibition at Mellors Fine Art Gallery in Toronto. In 1945, he had an exhibition in New York, reviewed in ARTnews, which travelled to Buffalo and St. Thomas. His first exhibition of black enamel paintings was in 1968 at the 20/20 Gallery, London. In 1976, the Volunteer Committee at the London Regional Art Gallery (today Museum London) commissioned a painting, Site, to commemorate the building of the new gallery (now this work and the sketch in black-and-white are both in the collection of Museum London which has over 20 works by the artist). In 1977, the Vancouver Art Gallery organized an exhibition titled Clark McDougall: Paintings since 1953.

In 1987, the London Regional Art Gallery mounted a posthumous travelling retrospective of McDougall titled John Street is a one-way Street: Clark McDougall Retrospective, curated by Paddy O'Brien. In 2011, the McIntosh Gallery, University of Western Ontario organized the exhibition Fugitive Light: Clark McDougall’s Destination Places, co-curated by Anna Hudson and Catherine Elliot Shaw. His paintings are in public collections such as the Art Gallery of Ontario, Vancouver Art Gallery, Museum London, the Robert McLaughlin Gallery, the University of Western Ontario, and the Canada Council Art Bank. His commissions included a series of murals for the entrance lobby of the Central Elgin Collegiate Institute, St. Thomas by the Elgin County Board of Education (1954) and 14 Stations of the Cross for Holy Angels Church, St. Thomas. Michael Gibson Gallery in London, Ontario represents his estate.

Clark McDougall died of a brain tumor in 1980 at the age of 59.

== Record sale prices ==
McDougall's Release of the Thistledown, sold at Toronto-based Waddington's Auction for $24,125 in 2015. It had been estimated at $2,000-3,000.
