= Clark Boyd (journalist) =

American radio journalist

Clark Boyd is an American radio journalist. He was the technology correspondent for The World, a daily global news program created by Public Radio International (PRI), and co-produced by PRI, the BBC World Service, and WGBH Boston. He has been with the program from 1996 to 2018.

He has covered stories from around the globe focusing on technology in its many forms and its impact on people around the world. His reporting on a four-part series on global stem cell research helped The World win an Alfred I. duPont-Columbia University Award for Broadcast Journalism in 2006. He was also the original host and creator of PRI's The World Technology podcast, which launched in February 2005, and was the first radio program at a national level to podcast. Clark continues to host this podcast which is consistently one of the top PRI Podcasts in iTunes, See PRI's The World and Public Radio International.

On 2011-07-12 Clark announced a hiatus in pod-casting The World Technology program. The announcement did not include anticipation of resumption of program distribution, though Clark stated he would remain as a technology reporter with WGBH-The World.1. The podcast was brought back by popular demand a few weeks later, with the introduction of "B-sides," longer stories, often taken directly from the BBC, and replay in length. After moving from Belgium back to the United States in summer of 2012, however, the podcast did not continue.

Clark has also had stints on Frontline World, WGBH Boston's global issues documentary series seen on PBS in which he covered numerous stories including a feature on Kiva.org and the impact of a silicon valley start up and technology on the Secret Files in Guatemala.

He holds a bachelor's degree in international relations from Georgetown University and a master's in theological studies from Harvard Divinity School. In 2006-07 Clark was a Knight Science Journalism Fellow at the Massachusetts Institute of Technology.
