= James Bringfeild =

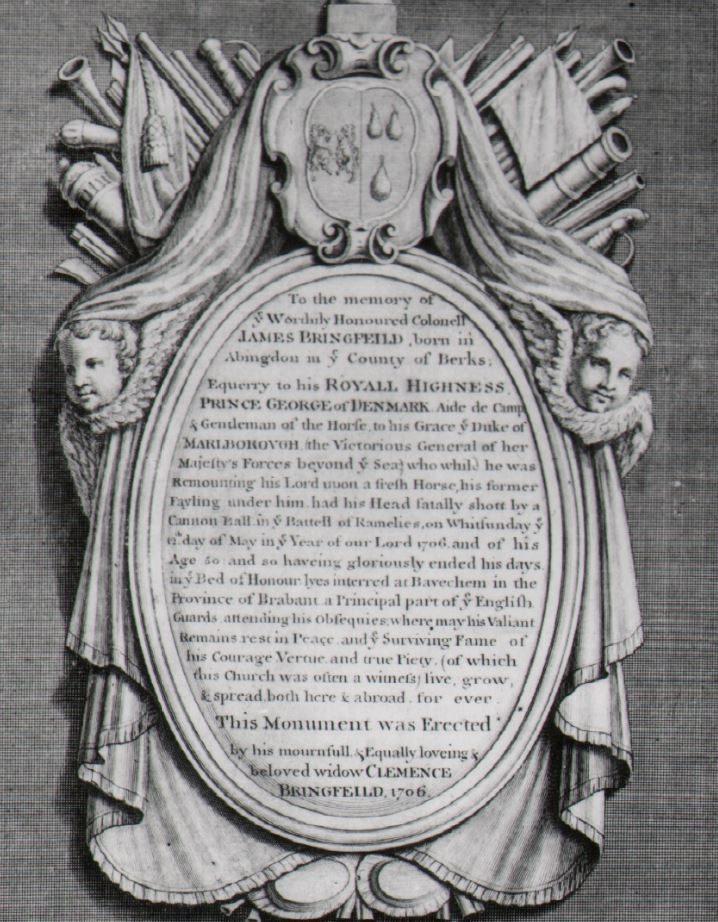
- Engraving of a memorial tablet at Westminster Abbey by William Richardson. Presented to Abingdon School in 1905.
- Born: 1656; Abingdon-on-Thames
- Died: 23 May 1706 (aged 49–50) Ramillies, Belgium
- Buried: Bavechem, Brabant
- Allegiance: Great Britain
- Branch: British Army
- Service years: 1685–1706
- Rank: Lieutenant-Colonel
- Conflicts: War of the Spanish Succession; Battle of Blenheim; Battle of Ramillies †

Lieutenant-Colonel James Bringfeild also spelt Bringfield (1656–1706) was equerry to Prince George of Denmark and Aide-de-camp to John Churchill, 1st Duke of Marlborough. He was killed in the Battle of Ramillies.

== Education ==
Born in Abingdon, he was educated at John Roysse's Free School in Abingdon (now Abingdon School) from c.1666-c.1670.

== Career ==
He was commissioned as a Cornet with the Charles Talbot, 1st Duke of Shrewsbury's Regiment of Horse (1685). He was promoted to Captain 1st Troop of Life Guards, Major of Horse (1702) and then Lieutenant Colonel, 1st Life Guards. He later became equerry to Prince George of Denmark and Aide-de-camp to John Churchill, 1st Duke of Marlborough during the Battle of Blenheim and Battle of Ramillies. According to his will he was from the parish of St Margaret's, Westminster.

== Death ==
An 18th century playing card depicting the death of James Bringfeild

He was killed during the Battle of Ramillies on 23 May 1706. There is a memorial tablet to his memory in the north aisle of the nave at Westminster Abbey. The account of the death was recorded by Captain Robert Parker of the Royal Regiment of Foot of Ireland, who wrote "His Grace (the Duke of Marlborough) had another narrow escape; when in shifting back from Captain Molesworth's horse to his own, Colonel Bringfield holding the stirrup, was killed by a cannon-shot from the village of Ramillies." The death is mentioned in the Duke's letter to his wife Sarah. It is believed that the shot may have decapitated him and the manner of his death resulted in many poems and stories being compiled during the period.

== Family and other life ==
He was married to Clemence Bringfeild who was responsible for erecting the memorial tablet. His coat of arms was an azure shield with three pears.

His death highlighted the use of the Ramillies wig which subsequently became a fashion.

== See also ==
- List of Old Abingdonians
