= Phanuel Bacon =

English playwright, poet and author

- Born: 13 October 1700
- Died: 10 January 1783 (aged 82)

Phanuel Bacon (13 October 1700 – 10 January 1783) was an English playwright, poet and writer. He was the son of the Phanuel Bacon, vicar of St Laurence's church, in Reading.

== Life ==
In his youth, Bacon attended John Roysse's Free School in Abingdon (now Abingdon School), from 1712 to 1715 and later entered St John's College, Oxford. He became vicar of Bramber, Sussex, and rector of Marsh Baldon, Oxfordshire.

== Works ==
Among his works are

- The Kite (1722), An Heroi-comical Poem. In Three Canto's
- The Moral Quack (1757), A Dramatic Satire
- The Insignificants (1757), A Comedy of Five Acts.
- The Tryal of the Timekillers (1757), A comedy of five acts
- The Occulist (1757), A Dramatic Entertainment of Two Acts
- The Taxes (1757), A Dramatick Entertainment
- The Snipe (1765), poem

== See also ==
- List of Old Abingdonians
