= Edward Dorrien Newbolt =

British army officer

Major general Edward Dorrien Newbolt
- Born: 5 March 1838
- Died: 26 July 1899 (aged 61)

Major general Edward Dorrien Newbolt (1838–1899) was a British Army officer who was the Commanding Officer and Major general of the 2nd Battalion Dorset Regiment.

== Education ==
Newbolt was educated at John Roysse's Free School in Abingdon, (now Abingdon School).

== Army career ==
On 8 November 1859, aged 21, he resigned from the Hertfordshire Militia. In 1877 he was promoted from Captain to Adjutant of the 54th Foot of the 40th Lancashire Rifle Volunteer Corps.

On 4 October 1878, he was promoted from Supernumerary Captain and Brevet to Major in the 54th Foot, 2nd Battalion Dorsetshire Regiment. On the 19 November 1885, he was promoted from Lieutenant-Colonel to Major general of the Regiment. He was the commanding Officer of the Regiment from December 1884 until his retirement in November 1887.

== See also ==
- List of Old Abingdonians
