= List of Old Abingdonians =

Former pupils of Abingdon School

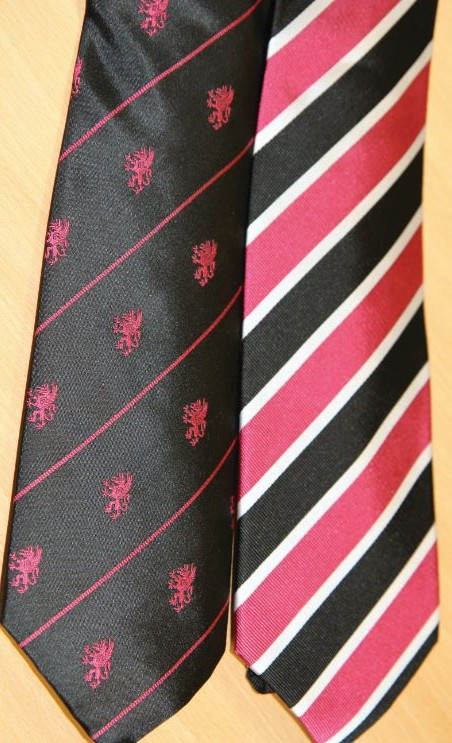
The Old Abingdonian ties (Griffen and Stripes)

Old Abingdonians are former pupils of Abingdon School or, in some cases, Honorary Old Abingdonians who have been awarded the status based on service to the School. The Old Abingdonians also run the Old Abingdonian Club (OA club), an organisation hosted by the school. It was founded in 1743.

== Born in the 12th century ==
- St Edmund Rich (St Edmund of Abingdon) (c. 1174–1240), Archbishop of Canterbury 1233–1240 (may have attended Abingdon)

== Born in the 16th century ==
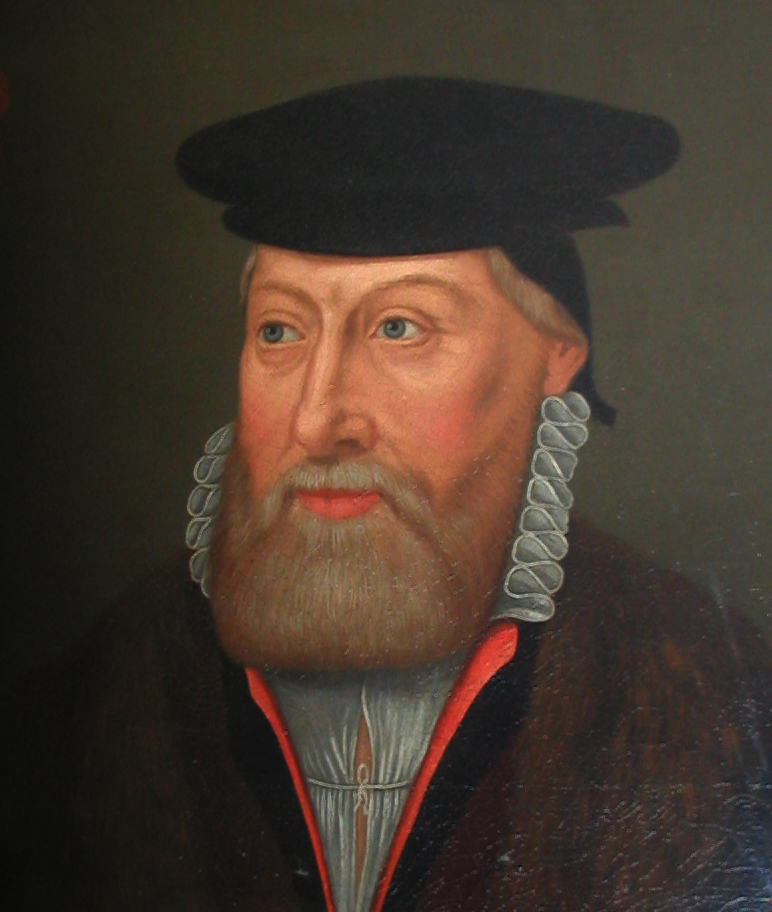
John Roysse

- Sir John Bennet (1552–1627), Chancellor of the Diocese of York, Judge and politician
- William Bennet (1553–1609), MP and founder of the Bennet scholarship
- John Blacknall (1583–1625), land and mill owner and founder of Blacknall bequest
- Sir John Mason (1502–1566), diplomat, spy, and Chancellor of Oxford University
- Robert Payne (1596–1651), English cleric and academic
- John Roysse (1500–1571), mercer, re-endowed Abingdon School in 1563
- Sir Thomas Smith, (1556?–1609), Judge and Member of Parliament
- Christopher Tesdale (1592–1655), member of the Westminster Assembly, of Divines
- Thomas Tesdale (1547–1610), maltster and benefactor, established the Tesdale Ushership

== Born in the 17th century ==
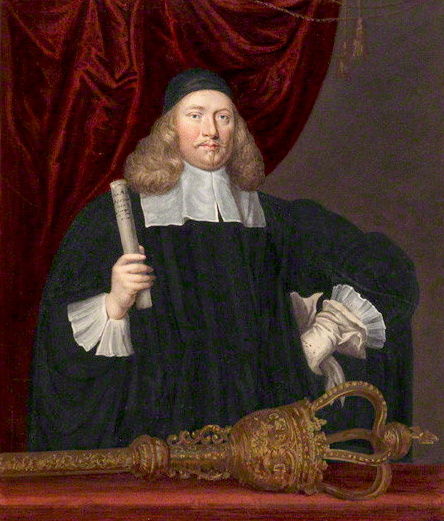
Sir Edward Turnour

- Phanuel Bacon (1699–1783), playwright, poet and author
- Clement Barksdale (1609–1687), religious author, polymath and Anglican priest
- Colwell Brickenden (1663–1714), clergyman and Master of Pembroke College, Oxford
- Colonel James Bringfeild, (1656–1706), equerry to Prince George of Denmark and Aide-de-camp to the Duke of Marlborough
- Joseph Cox (1697–1753), High Sheriff of Berkshire
- Thomas Daffy (1617–1680), inventor of Daffy's Elixir
- Walter Dayrell (1610–1684), Archdeacon of Winchester
- Walter Harte (1650–1735) Prebendary of Bath and Wells and a principal pillar of the Nonjuring schism cause
- Sir John Holt (1642–1710), Lord Chief Justice
- William Hunt (1669–1733), Archdeacon of Bath
- James Jennings (1670–1739), MP and landowner
- Henry Langley (1610–1679), nonconformist minister and Master of Pembroke College, Oxford
- Matthew Panting (1682–1739), Master of Pembroke College, Oxford
- Sir Edward Turnour (1617–1686), Speaker of the House of Commons

== Born in the 18th century ==
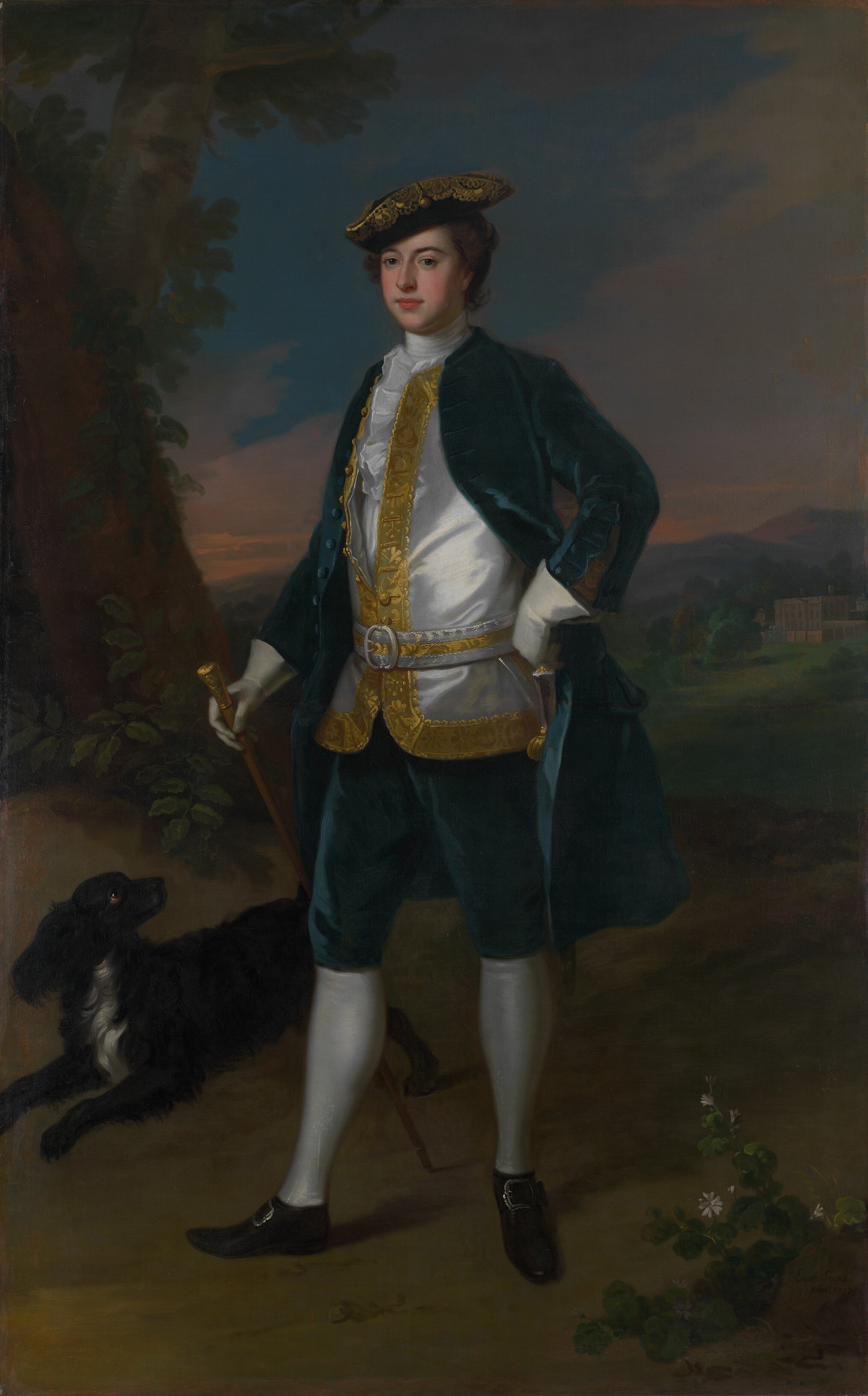
Sir James Dashwood

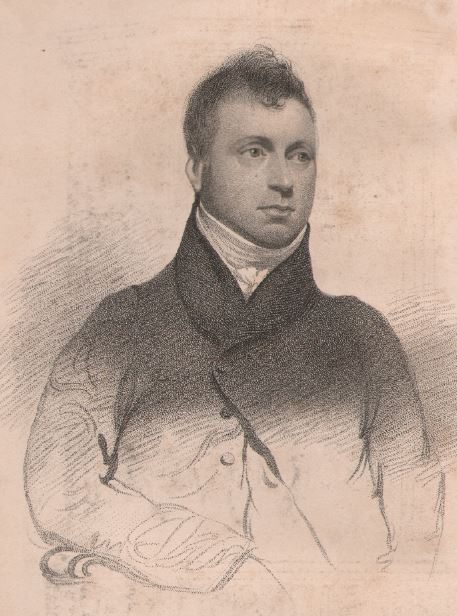
Thomas Fosbroke

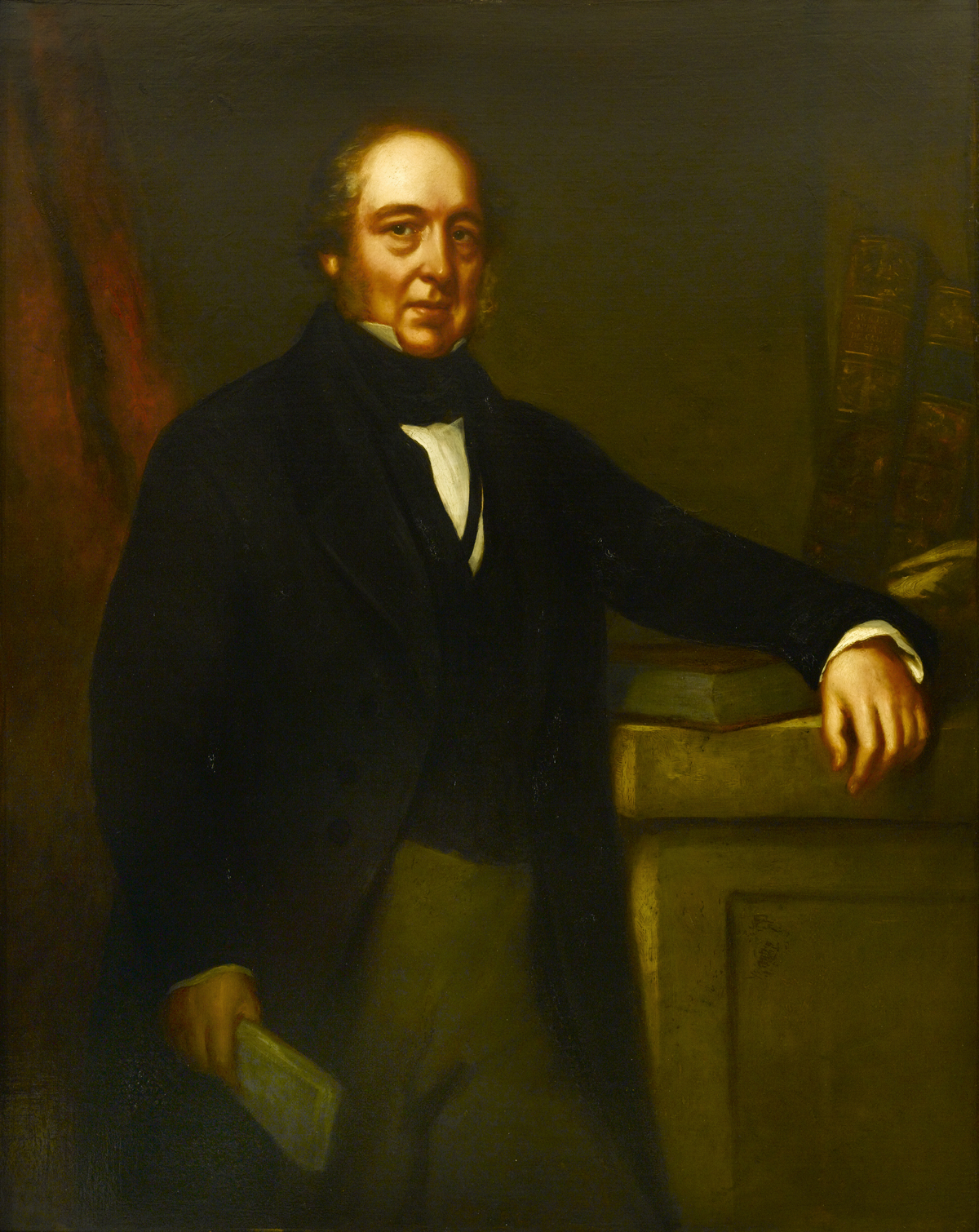
Clement Hue

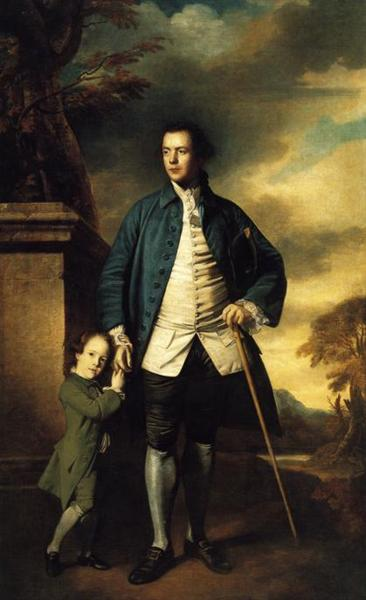
Edward Morant

- William Adams (1706–1789), Master of Pembroke College, Oxford
- Sir Henry Atkins (1726–1742), 5th Baronet of Clapham
- Sir Richard Atkins (1728–1756), 6th Baronet of Clapham & High Sheriff
- Lord James Beauclerk (1709–1787), Bishop of Hereford, 1746–1787
- Richard Brickenden (1701–1779), Archdeacon of Wiltshire
- Sir Charles Bagot Chester, 7th Baronet (1724–1755), 7th Baronet of Chicheley
- John Bush (High Sheriff) (1745–?), High Sheriff of Oxfordshire
- John Clarke (1732–1781), Provost of Oriel College, Oxford
- William Wiseman Clarke (1759–1826), High Sheriff of Berkshire
- Sir Francis Clerke, 7th Baronet (1748–1777), baron, killed at Battles of Saratoga
- Sir William Clerke, 8th Baronet (1751–1818), baron and clergyman
- Sir Henry D'Anvers, 4th Baronet (1731–1758), 4th Culworth baronet
- Sir Michael D'Anvers, 5th Baronet (1738–1776), High Sheriff of Northamptonshire
- James Dashwood (1715–1779), politician
- Henry Dawkins (1728–1814), Member of Parliament
- James Dawkins (1722–1757), antiquary and Jacobite
- Sir John D'Oyly, 4th Baronet (1702–1773), 4th baronet of Chislehampton
- William Horton (c. 1708–1749), leading military aide and builder of Horton House
- Daniel Dumaresq (1712–1805), St Petersburg Academy of Sciences, educationalist
- Thomas Dudley Fosbroke, (1770–1842), antiquary
- James Gerard (1741–1783), Warden of Wadham College, Oxford
- Richard Graves (1715–1804), clergyman, writer and translator
- George William Hall (1770–1843), Master of Pembroke College, Oxford
- William Hawkins (1722–1801), clergyman, poet and dramatist
- Sir Thomas Head (1715–1779), High Sheriff of Berkshire
- Henry Howe (1716–1781), 3rd Baron Chedworth
- John Howe (1714–1762), 2nd Baron Chedworth
- William Huddesford (1732–1772), Keeper of the Ashmolean Museum
- Clement Hue (1779–1861), physician
- Sir Justinian Isham, 7th Baronet (1740–1818), High Sheriff of Northamptonshire
- Sir Robert Jenkinson, 5th Baronet (1720–1766), 5th Baronet of Walcot and Hawkesbury
- George Knapp (1754–1809), British Member of Parliament for Abingdon
- John Loder (c. 1726–1805), clergyman, landowner and founder of the Old Berkshire Hunt
- Edward Morant, (1730–1791), Member of Parliament
- Philip Morant (1700–1770), historian
- John Morton (c. 1716–1780), MP
- William Newcome (1729–1800), Bishop and Archbishop of Armagh
- John Nourse (1705–1780), bookseller
- John Ratcliffe (1700–1775), clergyman and Master of Pembroke College, Oxford
- George Rowley (1782–1836), Master of University College, Oxford
- Clement Saxton (1724–1810), High Sheriff of Berkshire
- William Sergrove (1746–1796), clergyman and Master of Pembroke College, Oxford
- John Smyth (1744–1809), clergyman and Master of Pembroke College, Oxford
- Thomas Stock (1750–1803), social reformer, established the first Sunday school in England
- Major-General John Tombs (1777–1848), British East India Company and Indian Army
- Henry Leigh Tracy, 8th Viscount Tracy (1732–1797), 8th Viscount Tracy
- John Tracy (1722–1793), Viscount and Warden of All Souls College
- William Walker (1704–1761), Principal of New Inn Hall
- Philip Wenman, 6th Viscount Wenman (1719–1760), politician
- Thomas Whorwood (1718–1771), High Sheriff of Oxfordshire.

== Born in the 19th century ==
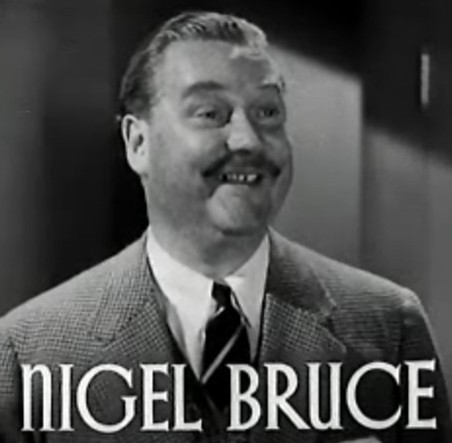
Nigel Bruce

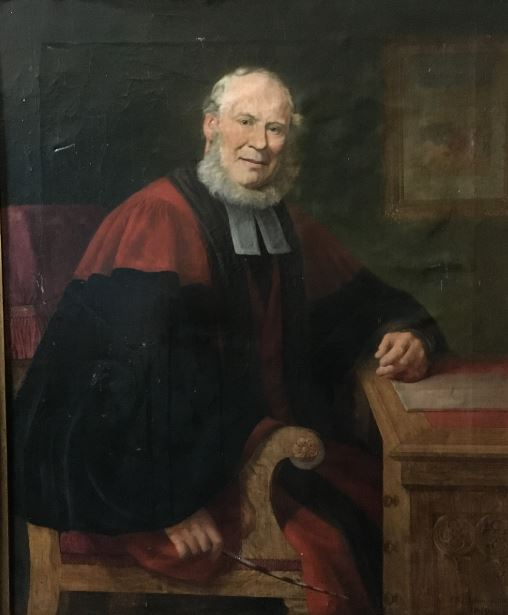
William Alder Strange

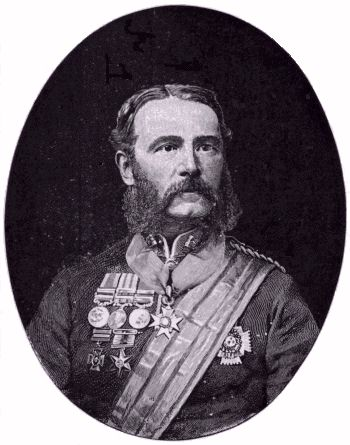
Major General Henry Tombs

- Sir William Boxall (1800–1879), painter, director of the National Gallery
- James Brooks (1825–1901), Gothic Revival architect
- Sir Michael Bruce (1894–1957), author, traveller and adventurer
- Nigel Bruce (1895–1953), actor
- Oswald Couldrey (1882–1958), author and watercolourist
- Louis Davis (1860–1941), Arts and Crafts stained glass artist
- Charles Harvey Dixon (1862–1923), politician
- John William Duncan (1885–1963), Welsh field hockey international
- Edward Ede (1834–1908), cricketer, Hampshire CCC
- George Ede (1834–1870), cricketer, captain, Hampshire CCC & Grand National winner 1868
- Harold Gilman (1876–1919), painter, founder member of the Fitzroy Group
- Henry Rudge Hayward (1831–1912), Archdeacon of Cheltenham and Cirencester
- Colonel Lacey Robert Johnson (1858–1915), Canadian Pacific Railway pioneer
- Thomas Malcolm Layng (1892–1958), Deputy Chaplain-General to the Forces, 1945, and Archdeacon of York
- Henry Medd (1892–1977), architect and church designer in Delhi
- John Theobald Milne (1895–1917), English fighter pilot and flying ace
- Edward Dorrien Newbolt (1843–1889), British Army officer
- Tracy Philipps (1888–1959), intelligence officer (Arab Bureau), later colonial official and conservationist
- Arthur Edwin Preston (1853–1942), mayor of Abingdon, Master of Christ’s Hospital
- Harry Redfern (1861–1950), architect
- Richard Rice, (1886–1939), 1912 Summer Olympics athlete
- William Henry Richardson (1836–1909), historian
- Norman Riches (1883–1975), cricketer, captain, Glamorgan CCC
- William Collinson Sawyer (1832–1868), Bishop of Grafton and Armidale, New South Wales
- William Alder Strange (1813–1874), headmaster and author
- Major-General Sir Henry Tombs VC KCB (1824–1874), Indian Mutiny Victoria Cross
- Willoughby Weaving (1885–1977), First World War poet
- Eric Whelpton (1894–1981), author and traveller

== Born in the 20th century ==
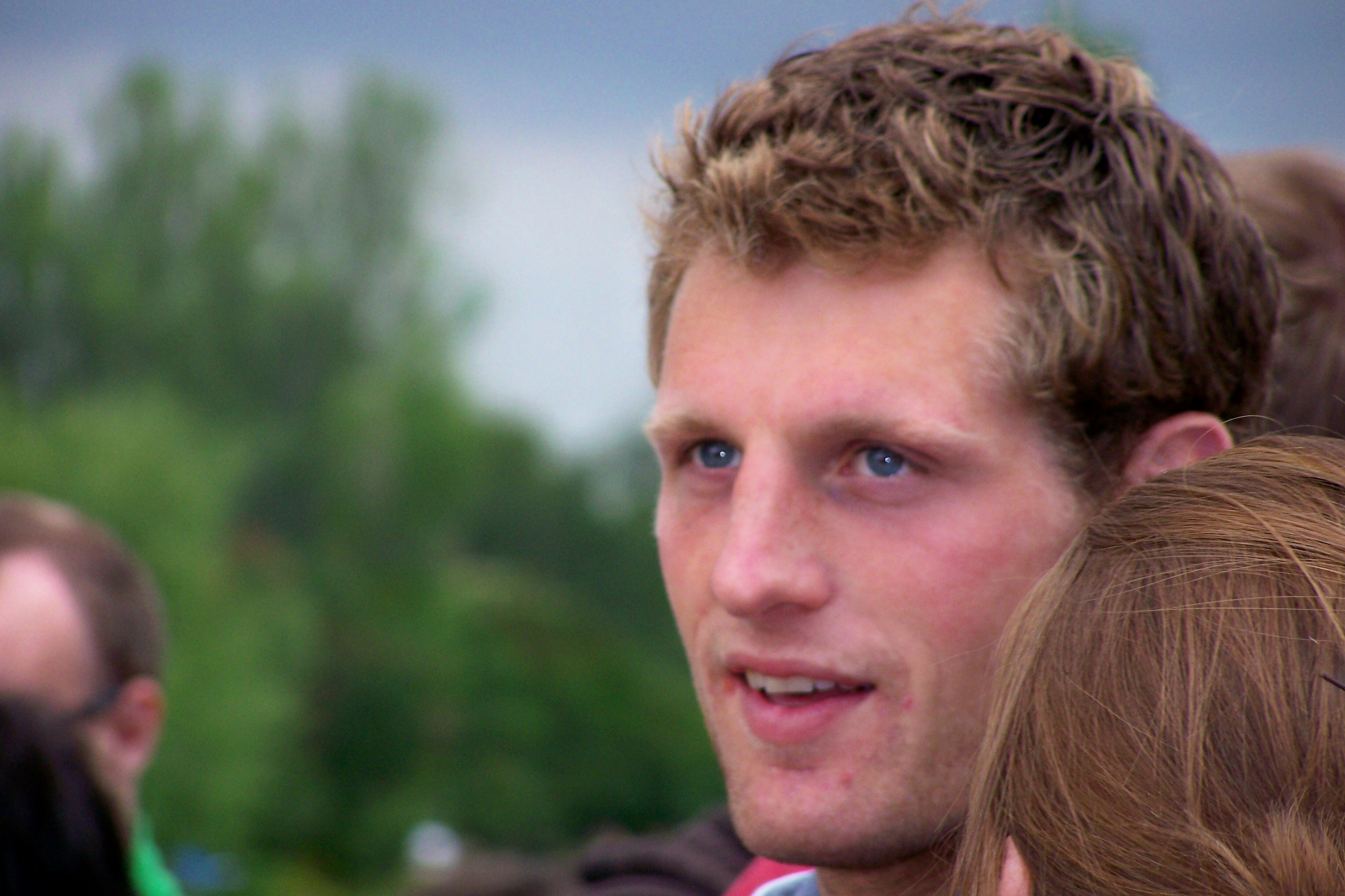
Robin Bourne-Taylor

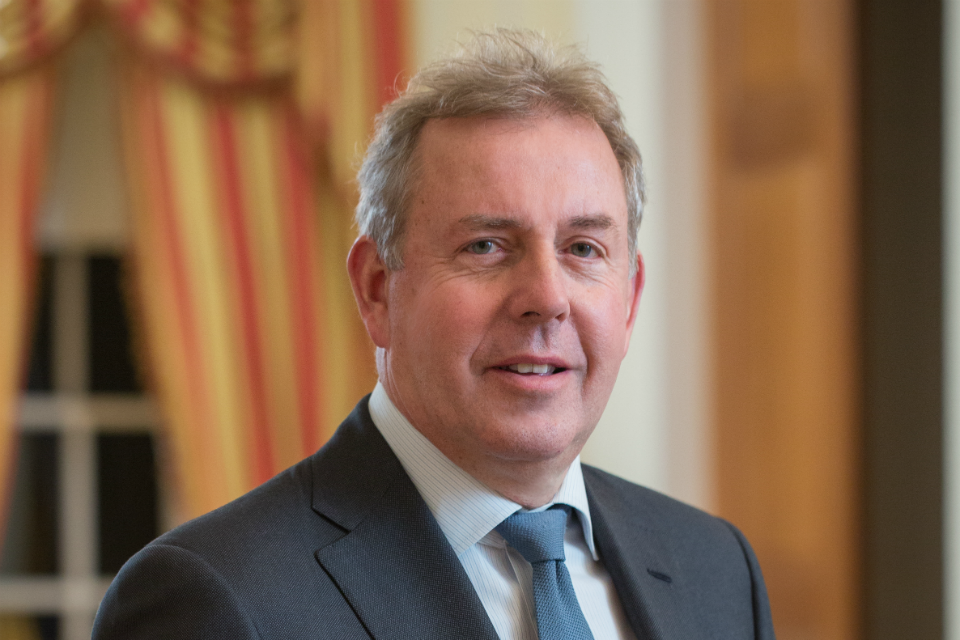
Sir Kim Darroch

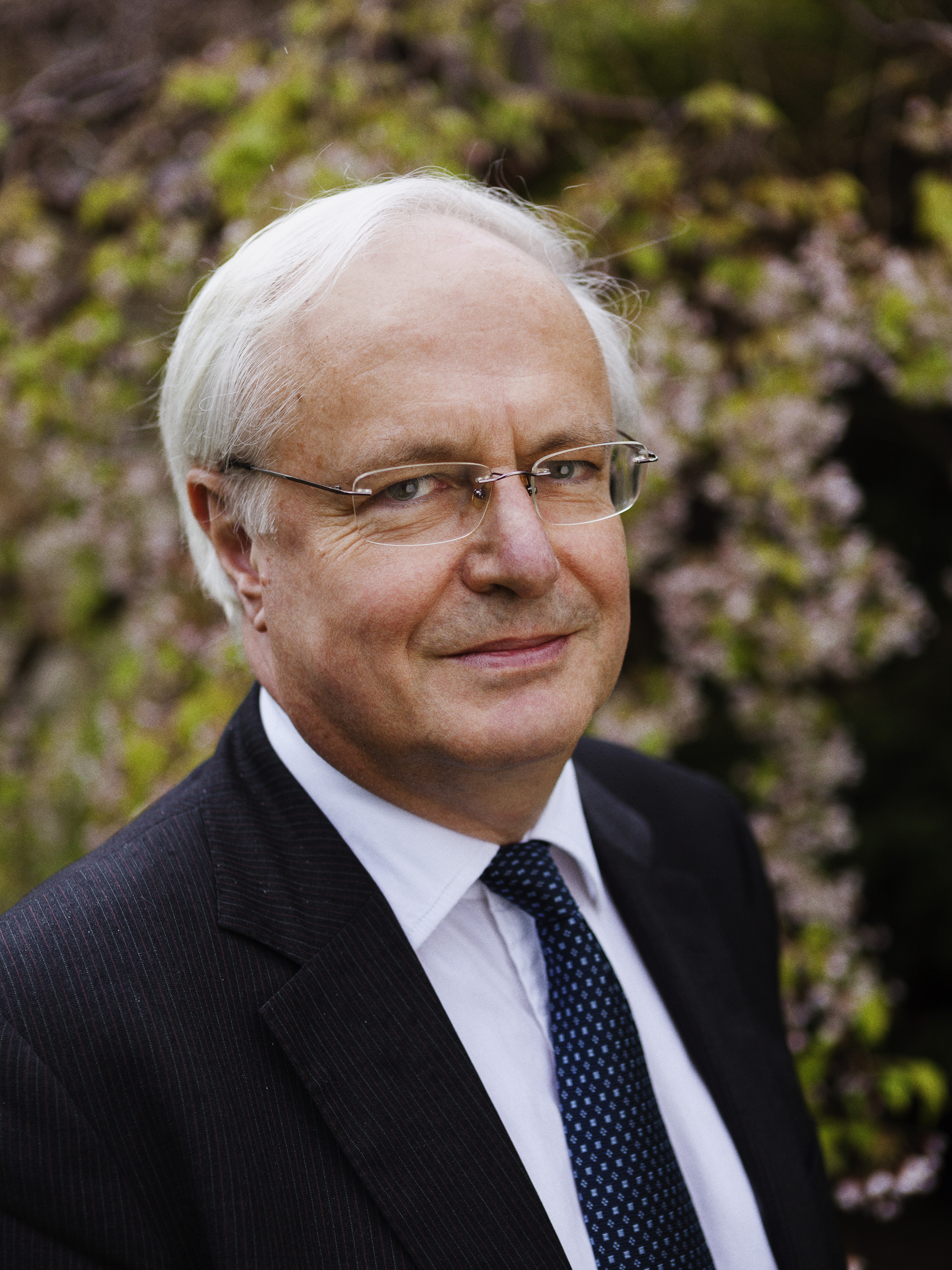
Chris Dobson

Michael Grigsby

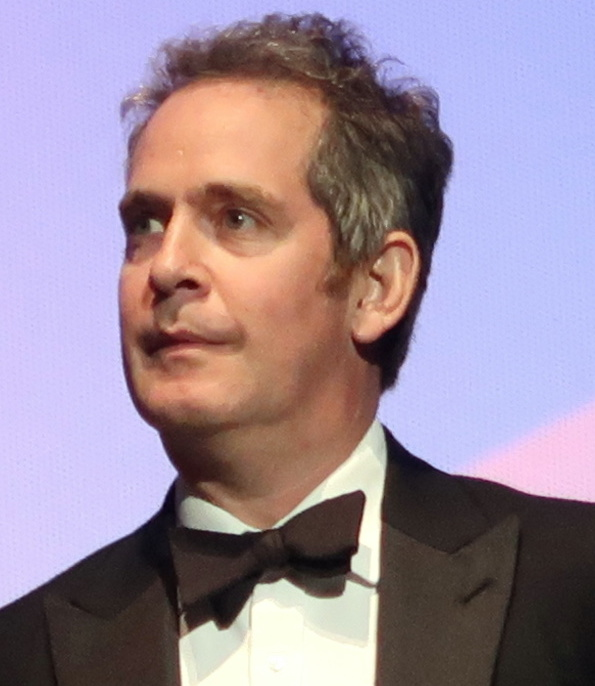
Tom Hollander

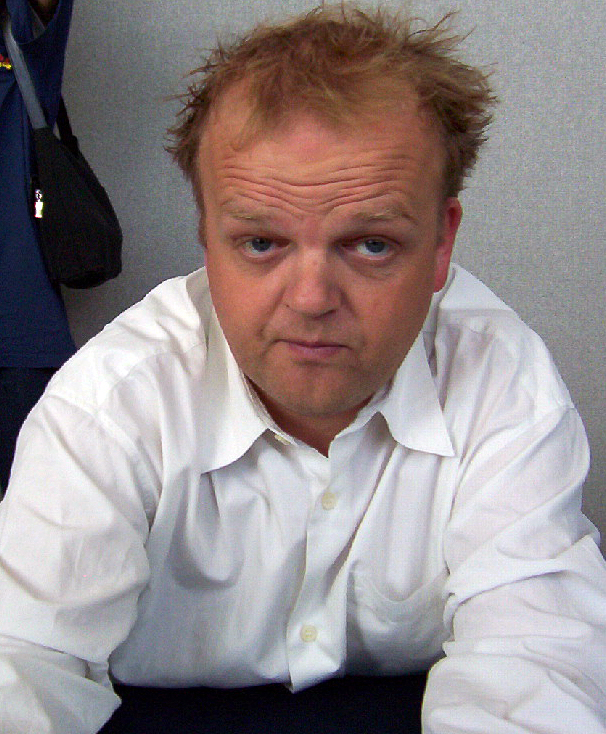
Toby Jones

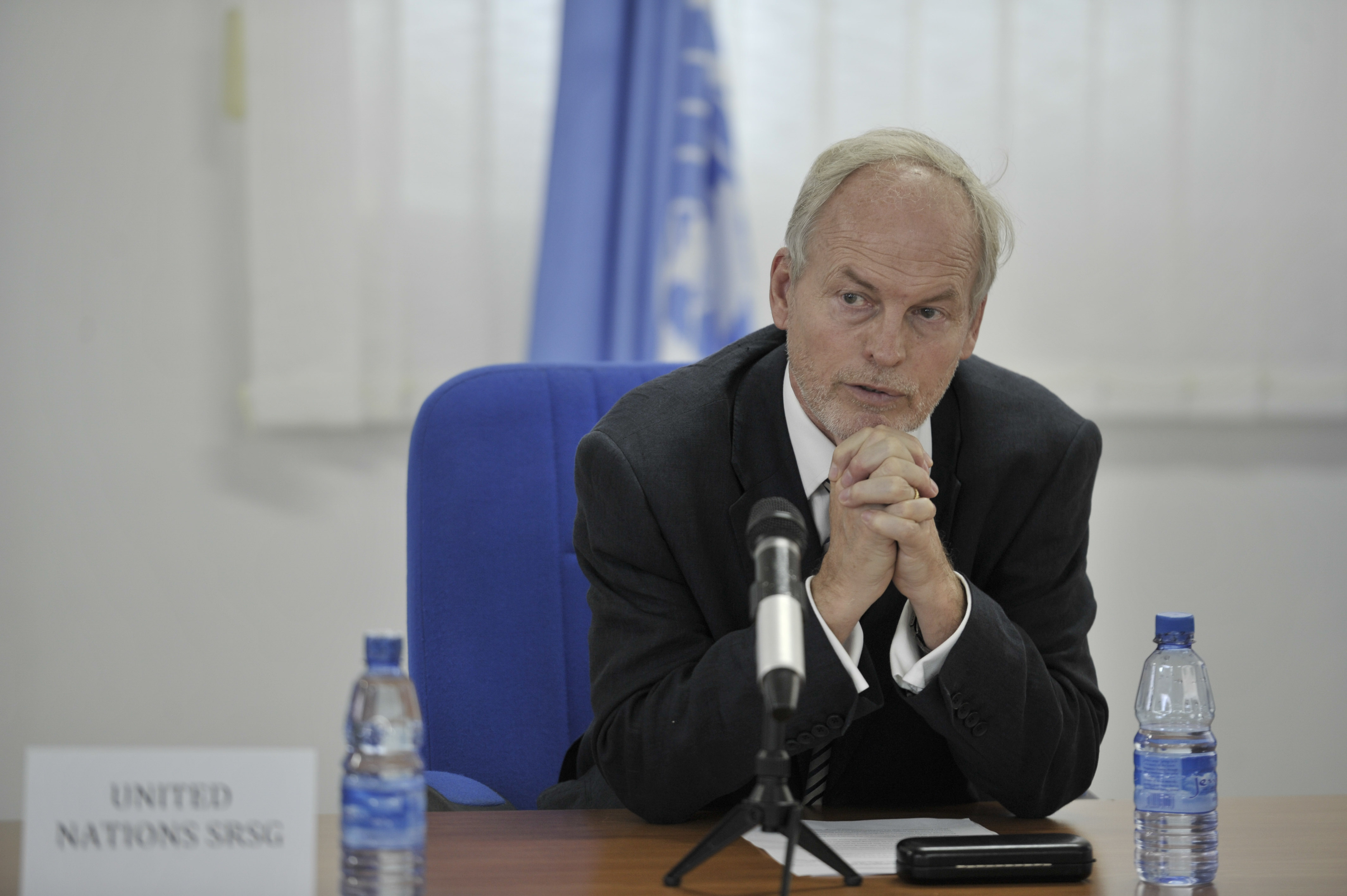
Nicholas Kay

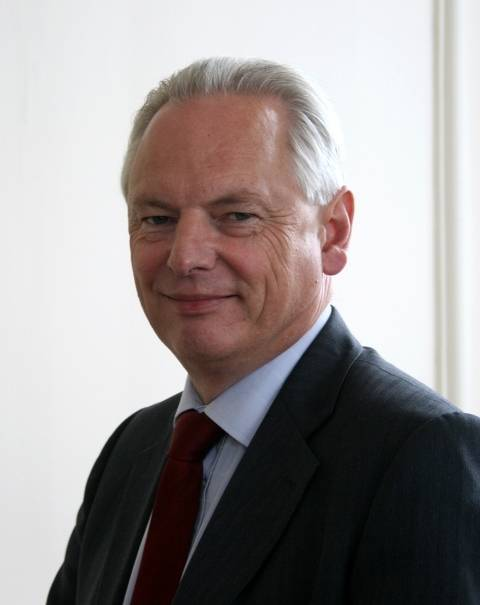
Francis Maude

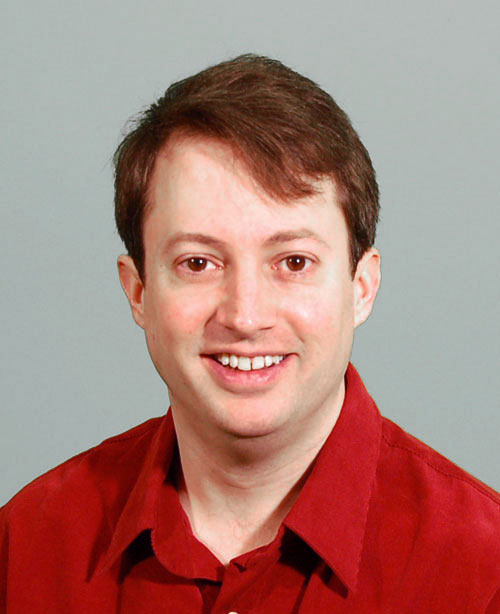
David Mitchell

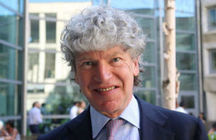
Tim Parker

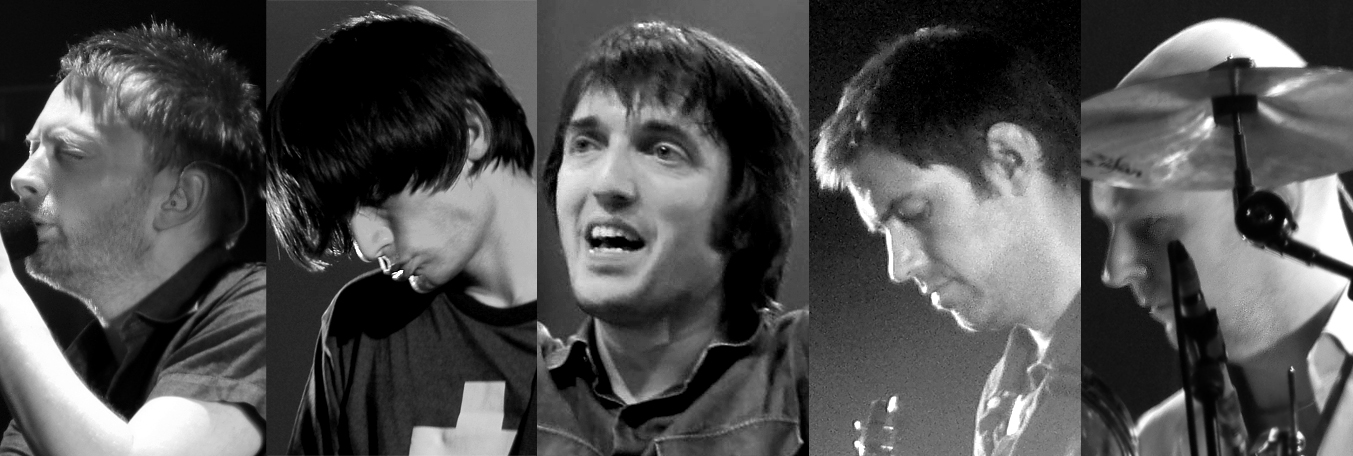
Members of the band Radiohead

- Roger Ainsworth+ (1951–2019), professor and Master of St Catherine's College, Oxford
- Sir Clive Alderton KCVO (born 1967), British diplomat and courtier
- James Allison (born 1968), designer, engineer, and technical director of Mercedes
- Sir Eric Anderson+ (1936–2020), teacher and educator
- James Anderson-Besant (born 1998), British organist and choir director
- Jamie Anderson (born 1985), producer
- Mark Andrews (1959–2020), University boat race rower
- Phil Baker (born 1975), rowing world championship medallist
- Michael Bartlett (born 1980), playwright and actor
- Michael Bateman (1932–2006), journalist and author
- Roger Blackmore (born 1941), politician and Lord Mayor of Leicester
- David Bobin (1945–2017), sports journalist
- Robin Bourne-Taylor (born 1981), Olympic rower
- James Bowler (born 1973), civil servant
- Peter Bradley (born 1953), Labour MP for the Wrekin
- Mark Bretscher (born 1940), biological scientist, FRS
- Nick Brodie (born 1986), University boat race cox
- Theo Brophy-Clews (born 1997), rugby union player
- Will Carter Keall (born 1997), EHL premier division hockey player
- Edward Castle, Baron Castle (1907–1979), British journalist and politician
- Sir Paul Robert Virgo Clarke KCVO (born 1953), government official
- Jamie Cook (born 1992), University boat race rower
- Oliver Cook (born 1990), international and world champion rower
- Cecil Davidge (1901–1981), lawyer and academic of Keble College, Oxford
- Sir Kim Darroch KCMG (born 1954), senior British diplomat
- Dawson Bros., comedy writers
- Tim Dawson (born 1988), screenwriter
- John Dewar, (born 1959), academic and law specialist
- Michael Dewar, (born 1997), Scottish rugby player
- Thomas Digby (born 1998), world champion rower
- Sir Chris Dobson (1949–2019), professor and academic, FRS
- Thomas Dolby (born 1958), musician and producer
- Jonny Donahoe (born 1983), comedian and writer
- Jon Dunbar (born 1980), international rugby union player
- Dick Eason (1902–1978), University boat race blue
- Edward Wilson (Eddie Eyre) (born 1988), actor
- Anthony Fawcett (born 1948), writer, art critic, and a former personal assistant to John Lennon
- Alex Fisher (born 1990), professional footballer
- Andrew Fisher (born 1965), physicist
- Michael Fortescue (born 1946), professor and academic
- Sir Andrew Foster (born 1944), British public servant
- Justin Frishberg (born 1972), Paralympic Games wheelchair rugby player
- Ben Gannon (born 1975), professional cricketer
- Alex Greaney (born 1975), University boat race cox
- Theo Green (born 1973), film composer, Oscar winner
- John William Greening MBE (1922–2010), benefactor and philanthropist
- Colin Greenwood (born 1969), member of Radiohead
- Jonny Greenwood (born 1971), member of Radiohead
- Magnus Gregory (born 1998), England international canoeist
- Michael Grigsby (1936–2013), film-maker
- Bruce Duncan Guimaraens (1935–2002), port wine maker, head of Guimaraens Taylor Fonseca, Porto
- Matthew Harding (1953–1996), businessmen and vice-chairman of Chelsea Football Club
- Martin Haycock (born 1973), University boat race cox
- Nick Hayes (born 1982), writer, illustrator, and campaigner
- Robert Hayward, Baron Hayward OBE (born 1949), Conservative MP for Kingswood
- Michael Hill (born 1951), English cricketer
- Sir John Hills, (1954–2020) professor and academic
- Michael Holding, (born 1958), filmmaker and director
- Tom Hollander (born 1967), actor
- Michael Howat (born 1958), English cricketer
- Martin Hyder (born 1961), actor and writer
- Adam Janisch (born 1975), English cricketer
- Philip Johnson (born 1972), lead architect for the London Stadium for the London 2012 Olympic Games
- Toby Jones (born 1966), actor
- Eddy Joseph (born 1945), sound engineer
- Sir Nicholas Kay KCMG (born 1958), British diplomat
- Tom Kempinski (1938–2023), playwright and actor
- Joseph Kennedy (born 1981), actor
- Robin Kermode (born 1958), communication coach and former actor
- Bryan Kibble (1938–2016), British physicist, inventor of the Kibble balance
- Martin Landray, physician, epidemiologist and data scientist
- Nicholas Lemoine, (born 1957) professor and academic
- Martin Lisemore (1939–1977), television producer
- Matthew Lodge (born 1968), diplomat
- Hugh Lunghi (1920–2014), British military interpreter and Foreign Office
- Ben Macintyre (born 1963), author and journalist
- Richard McMahon (born 1962), Bailiff of Guernsey
- Angus McPhail (born 1956), cricketer and warden of Radley College
- Toby Marlow (born 1994), writer and composer
- Francis Maude (born 1953), MP for North Warwickshire and Horsham, Chairman of the Conservative Party
- Ian Middleton (born 1995), university boat race cox
- David Mitchell (born 1974), comedian and actor
- Chris Newman (born 1990), field hockey international
- Felix Newman (born 1993), University boat race rower
- Ed O'Brien (born 1968), member of Radiohead
- Tim Parker (born 1955), former chairman of the National Trust
- Sir Robert Pasley (born 1965), Pasley baronets and CFO of Cell C
- Christopher John Pickup OBE, LVO (born 1942), retired British Army officer
- Nigel Powell (born 1971), musician
- David Pringuer (born 1972), musician
- Charlie Quarterman (born 1998), professional cyclist
- Sir Vivian Ramsey (born 1950), former High Court judge
- Markus Reitzig (born 1972), organisational scientist
- Andrew Robson (born 1964), international bridge player, teacher and columnist
- Toby Roche (born 1988), EHL premier division hockey player
- Colin Ronan (1920–1995), British author and specialist in the history and philosophy of science
- Matthew Rossiter (born 1989), international and European champion rower
- Graham Scott (born 1968), Premier League referee
- Philip Selway (born 1967), member of Radiohead
- Sir George Sinclair (1912–2005), colonial administrator and Conservative MP for Dorking
- Raymond Stross (1916–1988), film producer and director
- Sir David Tanner CBE (born 1947), British Olympic rowing coach
- Richard Tauwhare (born 1959), Governor of the Turks and Caicos Islands
- Fin Taylor (born 1990), stand-up comedian
- Russell Taylor (born 1960), writer, journalist and composer
- Rob Walker (sports announcer), Sports TV presenter (born 1975)
- Timothy Walker (born 1958), botanist and former Horti Praefectus of Oxford Botanic Garden and Harcourt Arboretum
- Nathaniel Watkins (born 1991), professional cricketer
- Michael Philip Westwood OBE (born 1944), retired Royal Air Force wing commander
- George Whittaker (born 1981), rower
- Richard Wilson (born 1968), CEO of TIGA
- Christopher Wray (1940–2014) actor and businessman
- Wayne Yip (born 1981), film and TV director
- Andy Yorke (born 1972), musician
- Thom Yorke (born 1968), member of Radiohead
- Kit Young (born 1994), actor

The symbol + denotes Honorary status.

== Born in the 21st century ==
- Charlie Atkinson (born 2001), rugby player

== See also ==
- Abingdon School Boat Club
- Abingdon Film Unit
