= Philip Johnson (UK architect) =

British architect

- Born: 1972 (age 53–54)

Philip Johnson (born 1972), is an architect and former Senior Principal at Populous, he led the design of the London Stadium for the London 2012 Olympic Games.

== Education ==
Johnson was educated at Abingdon School from 1983 to 1990, where he studied art and design. He was drawn to the theatre and designed sets for productions that included The Cherry Orchard, Captain Stirrick, Ubu Rex and Amadeus, in the Amey Theatre and Arts Centre. He co-founded a schools theatre company and produced two plays including Amadeus.

He attended Kingston University and University College London, where he studied architecture. He registered with the ARB and became a Member of the RIBA in 1998.

== Career ==
Following a few years working for Frankl + Luty Chartered Architects, working on the design of projects such as the Greenwich Yacht Club, he worked for Populous (formerly HOK Sport) in 2001 and was later promoted to Senior Principal.

Following six years developing the design of the redevelopment of Ascot Racecourse, he was tasked with leading the design of the main stadium for the Olympic & Paralympic Games in 2012, hosted in London, and later, its transformation after the games. This included creating a sustainable Legacy of the 2012 Summer Olympics and integration into the urban park. He led a team of 50 architects.

The Olympic Stadium won a Royal Institute of British Architects award and was shortlisted for the Stirling Prize.

His other works include the Masterplan and new Warner Stand at Lord's, the concept design for the Coca Arena in Dubai, the Riverside Stand at Fulham Football Club and most recently the Masterplan for the Allianz Stadium, Twickenham.

== See also ==
- List of Old Abingdonians
