= William Alder Strange =

British writer

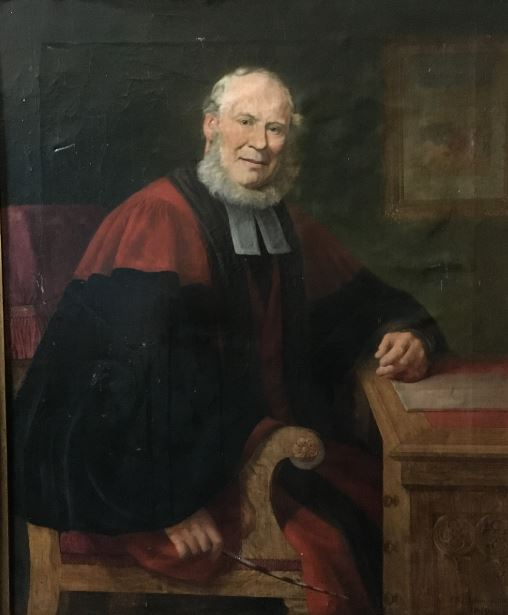
- Portrait of William Alder Strange
- Born: 23 June 1813; Abingdon-on-Thames
- Died: 17 April 1874 (aged 60); Bishop Middleham

William Alder Strange (1813–1874) was a headmaster and author.

== Background and education ==
The son of William Strange of Jersey and Abingdon, a wine merchant, William Alder Strange was educated at Christ's Hospital, London, where he was Senior Grecian, John Roysse's Free School in Abingdon-on-Thames (now Abingdon School), and Pembroke College, Oxford, where he held a college scholarship. He was awarded the first Boden scholarship in Sanskrit at Oxford in 1833.

== Career ==
Strange was appointed as a master at the Liverpool Royal Institution in 1833, then served as headmaster of Abingdon School from 1840 to 1868.

Augustus Hare described a visit in 1857: "...we had lunch with the Head-master of the Grammar School, who, as soon as it was over, apologised for leaving us because he had got 'to wallop so many boys'."

After retiring from Abingdon, he was vicar of Bishop Middleham in County Durham from 1868 to 1874.

== Family ==
Dr Strange was twice married:

1. In 1836, to Mary Elizabeth Davis, by whom he had four daughters and three sons.
2. In 1860, to Martha Richmond.

His eldest son Cresswell Strange was Canon Residentiary of Worcester.

== Publications ==
He published Cards on Logic, a series of his Sermons and was also a contributor to The Christian Annotator.

== See also ==
- List of Old Abingdonians
