= John William Duncan =

Welsh field hockey player

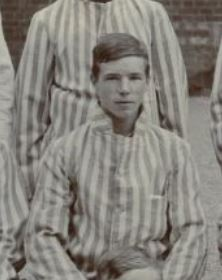
- John William Duncan pictured in the 1903 Abingdon School first XI cricket team
- Born: 31 October 1885; Cardiff
- Died: 4 April 1963 (aged 77); Cardiff

John William Duncan (1885-1963) was a Welsh international field hockey player.

== Education ==
He was born in 1885 in Cardiff, son of John Thomas Duncan of Llandaff. He was educated at Chard School, Somerset before arriving at Abingdon School, in January 1900, where he stayed until 1903. He excelled at sport and was part of the first XI cricket team during 1901, 1902 and 1903 and the football team. His brother Norman Duncan was Captain of the School in 1906 and a President of the OA Club.

== Career ==
After school John became a ship owner and broker, in the family business based in Llandaf. He later became Chairman for JT Duncan and Company.

== Field hockey ==
He represented Wales at field hockey during 1909, 1910 and 1911.

== See also ==
- List of Old Abingdonians
