= Anthony Fawcett =

British writer and art critic

- Born: February 1948; Uxbridge

Anthony Paul Fawcett (born 1948) is a British writer, art critic, and a former personal assistant to John Lennon and Yoko Ono from 1968 until 1970. He took over the role briefly held by Lennon's boyhood friend Peter Shotton, after Shotton's resignation from Apple Corps, and Fawcett's role was later filled by May Pang.

== Biography ==
Anthony Fawcett entered the London art world shortly after attending Abingdon School which he attended from 1959 until 1966, when he became an assistant at the Robert Fraser Gallery.

Fawcett later joined Lennon and Ono in the spring of 1968, as they made their first joint forays into avant garde art during the first flush of their romance (including two acorns planted near Coventry Cathedral, and Lennon's You Are Here, which consisted first of helium balloons with attached cards released into the English sky, then a room of charity collection boxes at the Robert Fraser Gallery surrounding the message "YOU ARE HERE" in Lennon's handwriting), Fawcett served as their personal assistant until their departure for New York City at the end of 1971.

Fawcett witnessed firsthand many of the goings-on at Apple's Savile Row headquarters (also chronicled in The Longest Cocktail Party by Richard DiLello), and many of the business and interpersonal breakdowns that marked the end of the Beatles as a group.

He later wrote a biography, John Lennon: One Day at a Time, published by Grove Press in 1976. A 1980 reissue (with updates) of this book inadvertently played a role in Lennon's murder, as Mark David Chapman bought and read a copy, discovering Lennon wasn't living in retirement at Tittenhurst Park as Chapman had thought, and that Lennon had resumed his musical career in New York.

Some years before this, after meeting musician Howard Devoto in New York and again in California in 1979, Fawcett decided to return to London at the beginning of the 1980s. He began to reintegrate into the London Arts scene, initially through befriending current musicians, artists and filmmakers. Fawcett picked up his professional relationship with art dealer Robert Fraser. Over the next few years (1982-6) Fawcett rapidly expanded his social circle to encompass several major artists. This period marked the beginning of Fawcett's construction of a new sort of powerful, yet discreet, liaising of business with the Arts.

Even at the very beginning of the 1980s, he was one of a small number of well connected and discriminating individuals who were drawing together many of the elements that would later enable the transformation of London into a major player in the international art world through the 1990s and beyond.

During this same period, Fawcett created Anthony Fawcett Associates with architectural writer and critic Jane Withers. Operating through this company he became involved in organising events for the Victoria and Albert Museum during the period when it was headed by Roy Strong.

He notably played a role in organising London's lavish Warhol event, initiated by the Warhol Foundation to mark the artist's death in 1987.

He extended his work to the Serpentine Gallery while also participating in organising major events for the Tate Gallery such as the opening of the new wing containing the Turner Gallery.

Fawcett is mentioned in Shout!: The Beatles in Their Generation, a 1981 book by journalist Philip Norman, and in Shotton's memoir The Beatles, Lennon and Me. He may also be the "Anthony" heard mentioned in "Radio Play", a track on Unfinished Music No.2: Life with the Lions.

== See also ==
- List of Old Abingdonians
