= Andrew Foster (British public servant) =

British public servant

Sir Andrew Foster
- Born: Andrew William Foster; 29 December 1944 (age 81)

Sir Andrew William Foster, KBE (born 29 December 1944) is a British public servant who was knighted in 2001 for his services to the health and government services.

== Early life and education ==
Foster was born in 1944 and was educated at Abingdon School.

== Career and appointments ==
Foster's appointments have included Chief Executive of the Audit Commission for England and Wales from 1992 and 2003, deputy chief executive (NHS), director of social services (North Yorkshire County Council), deputy chairman (Royal Bank of Canada) and advisor to the Chancellor of the Exchequer on public service.

In 2001, Foster received a knighthood in the 2001 New Year Honours.

In 2005, he presented a comprehensive report on the English further education system, entitled "Realising the Potential".

== See also ==
- List of Old Abingdonians
