= Markus Reitzig =

German organizational scientist

- Born: 1972 (age 53–54)
- Occupation: Organizational scientist

Markus Reitzig (born 1972) is a German-Austrian organizational scientist, and professor of Strategic Management at the University of Vienna, where he has served as subject area chair since the group's establishment in 2012. He is best known for his research on the strategic management of corporate innovation, and for his studies on the design of new organizational forms.

== Biography ==
Reitzig attended Ratsgymnasium Bielefeld and Abingdon School, the latter on the Dr.-Reinhard-Hector fellowship in 1988. He received a B.Sc. degree (“Vordiplom”) in chemistry from the University of Konstanz in 1994 and an M.Sc. degree in chemistry (“Diplom-Chemiker”) from Kiel University in 1998. During his studies in law and chemistry he also visited Libera Università Internazionale degli Studi Sociali Guido Carli (LUISS Rome) and the University of California, San Diego. In 2001, Reitzig completed his M.B.R. at LMU Munich, and he attained his PhD in business economics from the same university in 2002. He spent part of his PhD studies as a visiting scholar at the University of California, Berkeley. Reitzig's studies were supported by scholarships from the Bayer Studienstiftung and the German Academic Exchange Service (DAAD). In 2002 he became assistant professor at the Copenhagen Business School, where from 2004 to 2006 he worked as a tenured associate professor for Strategic Management. During this period, he was both a visiting associate professor at the Australian Graduate School of Management (AGSM) (in 2004 and 2005) and a visiting researcher at the Deutsche Bundesbank (2004 and 2005). From 2006 through 2012, Reitzig worked as an assistant professor for Strategic Management at the London Business School in England. In 2012, he assumed his current position at the University of Vienna. In 2014 and 2017, he was a visiting professor at INSEAD Business School, teaching on their Singapore Campus, and Keio University Tokyo, respectively.

Reitzig published numerous articles in peer-reviewed scientific journals as well as in practitioner magazines, and he has served on the editorial boards of journals such as the Strategic Management Journal (2013-), Organization Science (2014-), and the Journal of Organization Design (2015-). As of 2022, he has also been serving as a Contributing Editor to Strategy Science. He was nominated for and bestowed upon several awards for his research, amongst others the Tietgen Prize and the Bill Nobles Fellowship for his work on the design and leadership of non-traditional organizations, and received or was a finalist for diverse competitive research grants. Markus's latest book on the design and management of flat structures appeared in the spring of 2022. In January 2022, Professor Reitzig was listed amongst the top 15 researchers under 50 years of age by A/A+ publications in the Forschungsmonitoring Lifetime Ranking, which analyses the research of +2,100 business academics across Germany, Austria, and Switzerland - and came in first in the same ranking in Austria in the above category. In addition to giving media interviews, Markus regularly speaks at corporate and public events. Amongst others, he presented at the TEDx events "Aiming High" in Kufstein, Austria, in 2016, and "Adventures within Work" in Vienna, Austria, in 2020. His podcast "Management Research News in 220 seconds" (in German) is promoted in cooperation with the German business magazine brandeins.

For the past two decades, Markus has also been an independent advisor to numerous (inter)national organizations in his area of expertise. In 2023 and 2024, he held the role as Organization Design Expert and Scientific Advisor to Mercer Germany, working closely with their European transformations group on client projects.

Reitzig was born and raised in Germany and has been a German citizen since birth. In 2024, he was additionally bestowed Austrian citizenship in the interest of the Republic of Austria in recognition for his prior and to-be-expected contributions to science in the country.

== Articles ==
- “Corporate Hierarchy and Vertical Information Flow within the Firm - a Behavioral View,” Strategic Management Journal, 36/13 2015, 1979–1999 (with Maciejovsky, B.).
- “What's 'New' about New Forms of Organizing?,” Academy of Management Review, 39/2 2014, 162-180 (with Puranam, P. and Alexy, O.).
- “On Sharks, Trolls, and Their Patent Prey – Unrealistic Damage Awards and Firms’ Strategies of ‘Being Infringed’”, Research Policy, 36/1 2007, 134‐154 (with Henkel, J. and Heath, C.).
- Managing the Business Risks of ‘Open’ Innovation, McKinsey Quarterly, Winter, 17-21 (with Alexy, O.).
- Smart Idea Selection – Is Your Company Choosing the Best Innovation Ideas? Sloan Management Review, Summer 2011, 47-52.
- Big Picture – Patent Sharks, Harvard Business Review, June 2008, 129-133 (with Henkel, J.).

== See also ==
- List of Old Abingdonians
