= Ben Gannon =

Ben Gannon may refer to:

- Ben Gannon (cricketer) (born 1975), English cricketer
- Ben Gannon (producer) (1952–2007), Australian film, television and stage producer
