= John William Greening =

English philanthropist and benefactor

John William Greening MBE
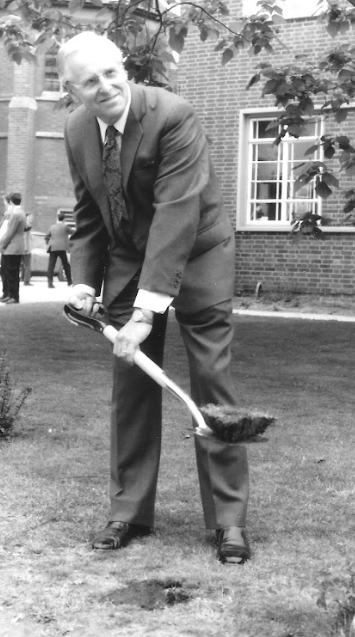
- Greening in 1989
- Born: 10 December 1922; Radley, England
- Died: 29 October 2010 (aged 87); Torquay, England

John William Greening MBE (10 December 1922 – 29 October 2010) was an English philanthropist and benefactor.

== Early years and education ==
He was the son of Arthur Greening (a cattle farmer) and was educated at Abingdon School from 1934 to 1937.

== Military service ==
He joined the Royal Air Force and was posted to Nova Scotia in August 1941. He became a flight lieutenant and flew Lancaster bombers over Germany. Much later he was welfare officer at the RAF Benevolent Fund.

== Career ==
He returned to mixed dairy and arable farming at Longfurlong farm, in 1946 and lived in Sunningwell for more than 30 years.

== Philanthropy ==
After retiring in 1980 he became known as a benefactor and philanthropist. He helped to establish Tilsley Park (named after his son John Tilsley Greening, who died in a road accident in 1979) and the Kidlington Ambulance Station. Tilsley Park was originally part of his farmland that was detached when the A34 was constructed. He also donated to the John Radcliffe Hospital, St Anne's College, Oxford and the Oxford Playhouse.

He was a benefactor to Abingdon School and in 1990 funded the construction of new laboratories which were initially called the Greening Laboratories and then became the Greening Wing. An entire section of the School containing the Greening Wing is now known as Greening Court. His portrait (painted by Juliet Wood, of Marlborough), commemorating his generosity, hangs in the Avernus room at Abingdon School.

He funded the creation of an Upper Room and refurbishment of his local Sunningwell church.

In 1992 he received an Order of the British Empire (MBE) in the 1992 Birthday Honours.

== Family ==
John Tilsley Greening (his elder son) was killed in a road accident aged 27. His younger son Simon attended Abingdon School and his first wife Vera continued to reside at Longfurlong farm.

== Later life ==
He lived in Freeland and then Cheltenham before moving to Torquay following the death of his second wife Barbara. He died in 2010 after suffering a heart attack.

== See also ==
- List of Old Abingdonians
