= Richard Wilson (British businessman) =

Chief Executive Officer of TIGA

Dr Richard Wilson OBE
- Born: 1968 (age 57–58)
- Occupation: CEO

Richard Christopher Wilson (born 1968) is the chief executive officer of UK development trade body TIGA.

== Education ==
Wilson was educated at Abingdon School from 1979-1986 and then the University of Reading where he gained a PhD. He also holds a Chartered Management Institute Diploma in Management.

== Career ==
He was the Head of Business Policy at the Institute of Directors from 1998 until 2006 before he became the Director of Communications for the Royal Academy of Engineering from 2006 until 2008.

In March 2008 he joined TIGA as their CEO. He campaigned for Video Games Tax Relief and introduced the TIGA University Accreditation system in 2015. Under his tenure TIGA has achieved Investors in People status (accredited to Bronze Status), achieved 27 business awards and commendations since 2010 and launched the TIGA Games Industry Awards to celebrate business, creative and technical excellence.

Richard is the Vice-President of the charity SpecialEffect and is the director of Creative Skillset’s Video Games Skills Council and the European Game Developers’ Federation, in addition to being a visiting professor at the University of Portsmouth.

He was formerly a Non-Executive Director for the Adult Learning Inspectorate and Improve, Chairman of the Better Payment Practice Group and a Governor at Christ the King School, Reading.

== New Year Honours ==
Wilson was awarded an OBE in the 2018 New Year Honours for services to the video game industry.

== See also ==
- List of Old Abingdonians
