= Will Carter Keall =

English field hockey player

Personal information
- Born: 1997 (age 28–29)

Senior career
- Years: Team
- 2014-2015: Reading
- 2016-2019: University of Exeter
- 2019-2020: Old Georgians

Will Carter Keall (born 1997) is an English field hockey player and player for Men's England Hockey League side Old Georgians.

== Biography ==
Carter Keall was educated at Abingdon School where he played for the first XI and gained colours. He joined the Wallingford Wildacts before being selected for the under-16 England team.

He was selected for the under-16, under-18 and under-21 England teams, and joined leading Men's England Hockey League side Reading Hockey Club. Ferom 2016 until 2019, he played for EHL team University of Exeter Hockey Club while undergoing Economics studies there. This culminated in him captaining the team to the gold medal at the British Universities and Colleges Sport Championship defeating Durham University Hockey Club in the final.

After leaving University, he signed for Old Georgians Hockey Club for the 2019/20 season.

== Personal life ==
His younger brother Max Carter Keall also plays for Reading and is a former Under-18 England international.

== See also ==
- List of Old Abingdonians
