= Adam Janisch =

English cricketer

Personal information
- Full name: Adam Nicholas Janisch
- Born: 21 October 1975 (age 51); Hammersmith, London, England
- Batting: Right-handed
- Bowling: Right-arm medium

Domestic team information
- Years: Team
- 1995–1998: Cambridge University

Career statistics
Competition	First-class
Matches	18
Runs scored	168
Batting average	15.27
100s/50s	–/–
Top score	26*
Balls bowled	2,489
Wickets	26
Bowling average	59.15
5 wickets in innings	–
10 wickets in match	–
Best bowling	4/71
Catches/stumpings	2/–
- Source: Cricinfo, 12 January 2022

Adam Nicholas Janisch (born 21 October 1975) is an English former first-class cricketer.

Janisch was born at Hammersmith in October 1975. He was educated at Abingdon School, before going up to Trinity College, Cambridge. While studying at Cambridge, he played first-class cricket for Cambridge University Cricket Club from 1995 to 1998, making 18 appearances. After claiming Test cricketer John Crawley as his maiden first-class wicket in his second first-class appearance, Janisch went on to take a further 25 wickets with his medium pace bowling at an average of 59.15, with best figures of 4 for 71. As a lower order batsman, he scored 168 runs at a batting average of 15.27 and made a highest score of 26 not out.

== See also ==
- List of Old Abingdonians
