= Lacey Robert Johnson =

Canadian Pacific Railway pioneer

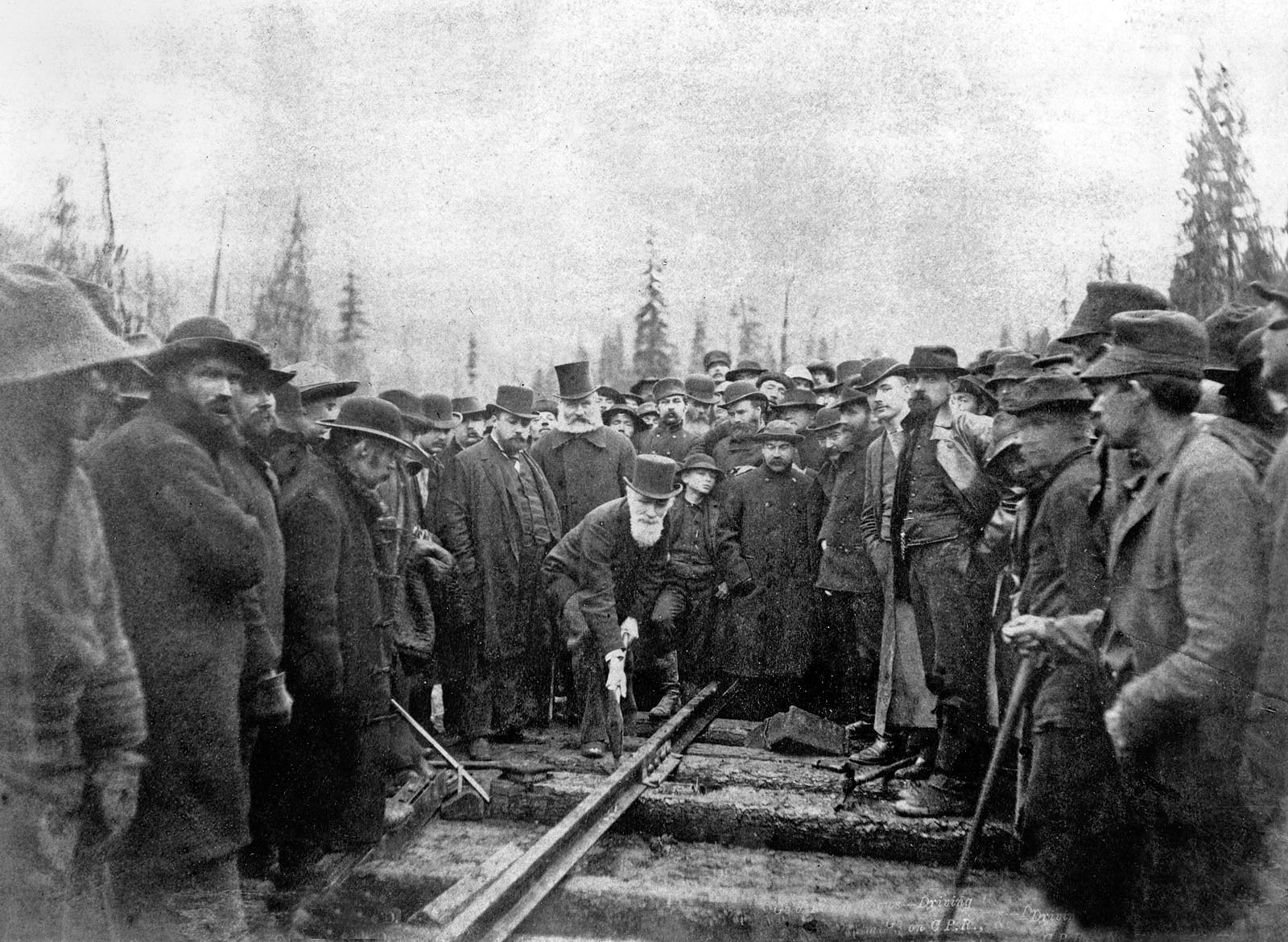
- Johnson is somewhere in this photo of the Last Spike of the Canadian Pacific Railway, 7 November 1885, Craigellachie, British Columbia
- Born: 2 June 1855; Abingdon-on-Thames, Oxfordshire, England
- Died: 1915 (aged 59–60); Montreal, Quebec, Canada

Colonel Lacey Robert Johnson (1855–1915) was a Canadian Pacific Railway pioneer.

== Early life and education ==
Lacey Johnson was born 22 June 1855, in Abingdon-on-Thames, the son of James Lacey Johnson, draper, of Market Place, Abingdon, Oxfordshire, England. He was educated at Abingdon School from 1865 to 1868.

== Career ==
He entered the Great Western Railway works at Swindon (1870), then was chief engineer of paper mills and worked at Woolwich Royal Arsenal (1875).

He first went to India, and then to Canada, where he joined the Grand Trunk Railway (1882) and became chief engineer to the Canadian Pacific Railway. He was photographed in the Press with Lord Strathcona driving the last spike at Craigellachie (November 1885) for the CPR. He was general superintendent of shipping and superintendent of rolling stock at Montreal (1901). A member of the Canadian Society of Civil Engineers, he became president of the Canadian Railway Club, Squire of the Order of St John of Jerusalem and Grand Master of the Grand Lodge of British Columbia and the Yukon (1895–96).

Lacey Johnson served in the First World War as Colonel, Canadian Heavy Artillery and was responsible for the munitions output of Canada. He died in Montreal in 1915.

== See also ==
- List of Old Abingdonians
