= Nick Lemoine =

British academic (born 1957)

Professor Nick Lemoine CBE FRCPath FMedSci
- Born: 11 December 1957 (age 68); Ealing, Middlesex, England

Nicholas Robert Lemoine (born 11 December 1957) is a British academic, professor at Queen Mary University of London, director of the Barts Cancer Institute and centre lead, Centre for Molecular Oncology.

Lemoine's main interests are "the genomics and molecular pathology of pancreatic cancer and the development of oncolytic virotherapy".

He was educated at Abingdon School from 1971 until 1976 before studying medicine at St Bartholomew's Hospital Medical College from 1977 until 1983. He was elected a Fellow of the Academy of Medical Sciences in 2006.

Lemoine was appointed Commander of the Order of the British Empire (CBE) in the 2022 New Year Honours for services to clinical research, particularly during COVID-19.

== See also ==
- List of Old Abingdonians
