= Insane Robots =

2018 video game

- Developer: Playniac
- Publisher: Playniac
- Director: Rob Davis
- Engine: Unity
- Platforms: PlayStation 4, macOS, Windows, Xbox One
- Release: PlayStation 4; July 10, 2018; macOS, Windows; July 12, 2018; Xbox One; July 13, 2018
- Genres: Roguelite, turn-based strategy
- Mode: Single-player

Insane Robots is a rogue-lite, turn-based strategy game developed and published by Playniac. It was released for PlayStation 4, Xbox One, MacOS and Microsoft Windows in July 2018.

== Accolades ==
The game was nominated for the "Creativity Award" and "Best Strategy Game" at The Independent Game Developers' Association Awards 2018.
