= Angus McPhail =

English cricketer and educator

Personal information
- Full name: Angus William McPhail
- Born: 25 May 1956 (age 70); Ipswich, Suffolk, England
- Batting: Right-handed
- Role: Wicket-keeper

Domestic team information
- Years: Team
- 1977: Oxford University

Career statistics
| Competition | First-class |
|---|---|
| Matches | 4 |
| Runs scored | 63 |
| Batting average | 9.00 |
| 100s/50s | –/– |
| Top score | 37 |
| Catches/stumpings | 6/– |
- Source: Cricinfo, 9 June 2020

Angus William McPhail (born 25 May 1956) is an English former first-class cricketer and educator.

McPhail was born at Ipswich in May 1956. He was educated at Abingdon School where he was a member of the first XI and was awarded the annual cricket prize. After Abingdon he went to University College, Oxford. While studying at Oxford, he played first-class cricket for Oxford University in 1977, making four appearances. Playing as wicket-keeper, he scored 63 runs in his four matches, with a high score of 37. Behind the stumps he took six catches.

After graduating from Oxford, McPhail worked for the Bank of England overseas department, before changing careers to become a schoolteacher. He began his teaching career at Glenalmond College, before becoming head of economics at Sedbergh School. He was appointed headmaster of Strathallan School in 1993, a position he held until 2000. He became warden of Radley College in 2000, where he remained until his retirement in 2014. After his retirement, McPhail studied for his Master of Letters degree in modern history at the University of St Andrews. He qualified as a mediator with the London School of Mediation in 2016.

== See also ==
- List of Old Abingdonians
