= Michael Holding (filmmaker) =

British filmmaker

Mike Holding
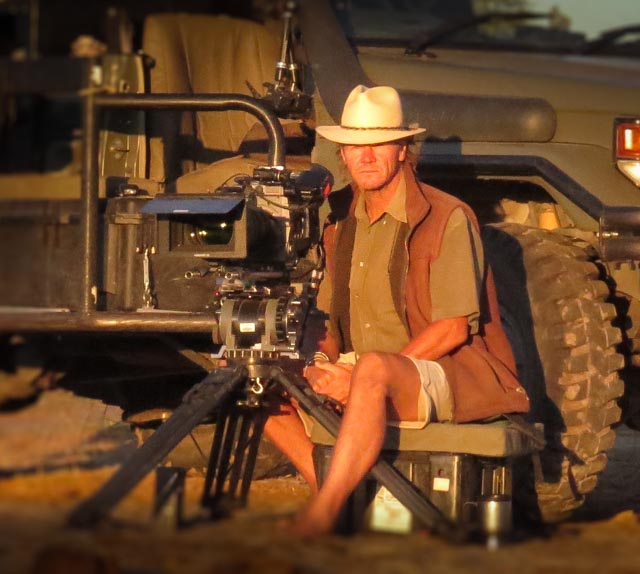
- Born: 30 May 1958 (age 67); Nairobi, Kenya
- Occupations: Filmmaker, cameraman, director, wildlife consultant

Mike Holding (born 30 May 1958) is a Kenyan-born, British filmmaker, cameraman, director and wildlife consultant.

== Life and career ==
Born in Nairobi, Kenya, Holding was educated at Abingdon School in Oxfordshire, England. He then studied zoology at the University of Exeter.

Based in Botswana, he was the director, producer and cameraman for several episodes of the BBC Natural World TV series including "A Wild Dog's Story", which was a nominated finalist in the 2002 Royal Television Society awards and won several awards at the International Wildlife Film Festival (Missoula), and the "Elephants without Borders" episode in February 2009, which was Emmy nominated by Animal Planet in three categories.

Holding was also a principal cameraman for many of the sequences in the Disneynature feature films Elephant and Earth and the "From Pole to Pole" episode of the BBC series Planet Earth, which won the best photography award at the BAFTAs. Holding has served as principal wildlife cameraman on numerous high end blue chip natural history films and TV series for 35 years. Specialities include long lens behavioural camerawork and drone cinematography.

As part of the Planet Earth camera team he has won several awards, including an Emmy Award for cinematography. A more recent Emmy came from the Netflix series "Nature's Babies".

With nearly 45 years of flying experience, Mike pilots his own Cessna 182 aircraft for aerial camerawork and for reconnaissance and supply runs to crews in remote areas. A passionate conservationist, Mike dedicates a lot of time when not filming to assisting researchers with aerial surveys.

== Productions ==
- "A Wild Dog's Story" (2002)
- "Swamp Cats" (BBC, 2004)
- "Planet Earth" (BBC, 2006)
- "Earth" (Disney 2007 film)
- "Elephants without Borders" (BBC, 2009)
- "Nature's Great Events, the Great Flood" (BBC, 2009)
- "Paseka the Easter Elephant" (2013)
- "Supernatural" (Netflix, 2022)
- "A year on Earth" (2023)
- "Our Universe" (2022)
- "Elephant" (Disneynature 2020)
- "Dynasties"
- "Hostile Planet"
- "Life" BBC
- "Life of Mammals" BBC
- "Wild Babies" Netflix
- "Queens" Nat Geo
- "Earthsound" Apple TV+
- "Animals Up Close" Disney+, Nat Geo
- "Big Beasts" Apple TV+
- "A Year on Planet earth" ITVX

== See also ==
- List of Old Abingdonians
- imdb https://pro.imdb.com/name/nm2145817/credits
