= Hugh Lunghi =

British military interpreter

- Born: 3 August 1920; British Legation in Persia
- Died: 14 March 2014 (aged 93)

Hugh Albert Lunghi (3 August 1920 – 14 March 2014) was a British military interpreter and veteran of World War II. He served as an interpreter for Prime Minister Winston Churchill during the war, often accompanying Churchill to summits with other world leaders. Lunghi was one of the last living participants of the "Big Three" meetings between Allied leaders at Tehran, Yalta and Potsdam.

Lunghi was the first British soldier to enter Hitler's bunker in Berlin in 1945. Soviet troops, who were guarding the bunker, had granted Lunghi permission to enter. He kept one volume of Hitler's Brockhaus Enzyklopädie from the bunker as a memento.

== Early life and education ==
Lunghi was born at the British Legation in Tehran, Persia on 3 August 1920. His father, Phillip Lunghi, was an economic adviser at the legation. His mother, Helena, was an Anglo-Russian. The Lunghi family returned to the United Kingdom when Hugh Lunghi was ten months old. His mother taught him Russian. Lunghi attended Abingdon School, Abingdon-on-Thames, Oxfordshire, until 1939, where he was Head Boy and captained the 1st XV at rugby for a record three consecutive years. Lunghi studied Greek and Latin at the University of Oxford.

== Biography ==
Hugh Lunghi's first wife was Helen Kaplan; the couple had one daughter. In April 1950, he married his second wife, Renée Banks, with whom he had three daughters. The Lunghi family moved to Fleet, Hampshire, in 1960. He became a longtime parishioner of St Phillip & St James, as well as All Saints, in Fleet.

After the war, Lunghi worked as Second Secretary at the Moscow Embassy. He interpreted for Field Marshal Montgomery in 1948 at crisis meetings at the Kremlin during the Berlin Blockade. The following year, he was posted back to the Foreign Office in London, and managed to smuggle home under his seat on the train the Laika hound which he had rescued from fierce shepherd dogs in Georgia.

His Russian fiancée, an opera singer, was not so fortunate. Although, as a favour by Stalin to Lunghi, she was given permission to leave the Soviet Union, she was then taken off the train bringing her to the West after first being poisoned by the KGB. Only many years later did Lunghi discover that she had subsequently been sent to Siberia.

Lunghi had a daughter by his wartime marriage to Helen Kaplan, which was dissolved. In 1950 he married Renée Banks.

In 1954, he joined the BBC World Service. He became deputy head of current affairs commentaries and then head of the Central European department, which broadcast to Poland, Hungary and Czechoslovakia. During the crushing of the Prague Spring by Warsaw Pact forces in 1968, he was the BBC's principal commentator for both radio and television audiences.

He continued his campaign for freedom of expression as director from 1980 of the Writers’ and Scholars’ Educational Trust, and as editor of its journal, Index on Censorship. He was able to revisit Russia in the 1990s, later lectured on Soviet affairs to universities, and was an invaluable source of information and wartime reminiscence for historians

== Death ==
Lunghi died on 14 March 2014 at the age of 93. His wife, Renée, had died in 1992. He was survived by his three daughters; the eldest, Xanthe, has been planning adviser to the NFU; Melissa has worked for many years for the NHS; and Diana is a retail fashion manager.

== See also ==
- List of Old Abingdonians
- The Papers of Hugh Lunghi held at Churchill Archives Centre
