= Christopher John Pickup =

British Army officer

- Born: August 1942 (age 83)

Colonel Christopher John Pickup LVO OBE (born August 1942) is a retired British Army officer who was chief of staff and regimental colonel of the Army Air Corps. He was later secretary of the Royal Warrant Holders Association and was made a lieutenant (LVO) of the Royal Victorian Order in the 2007 New Year Honours.

== Early life ==
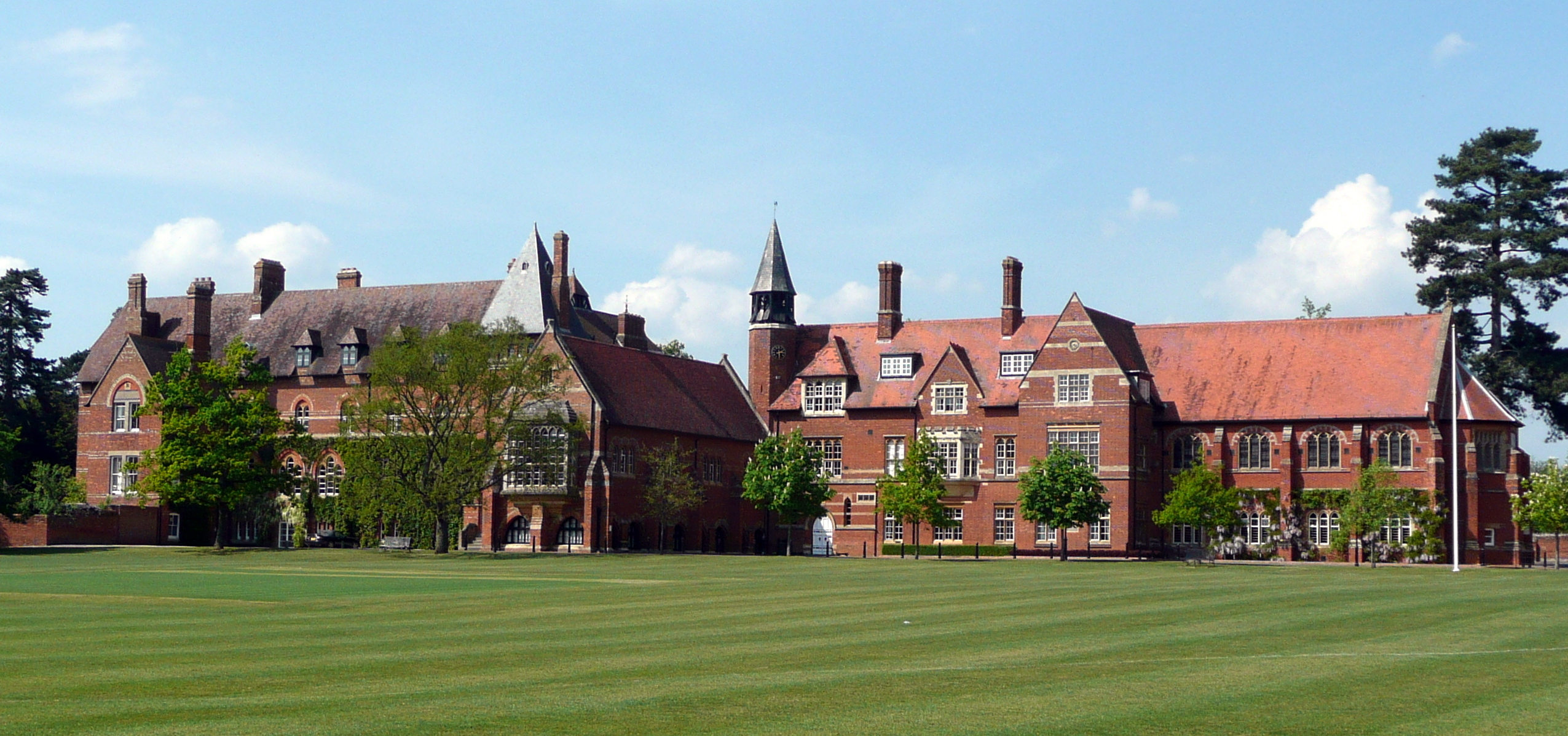
Abingdon School

Pickup was born in August 1942 and educated at Abingdon School.

== Army career ==
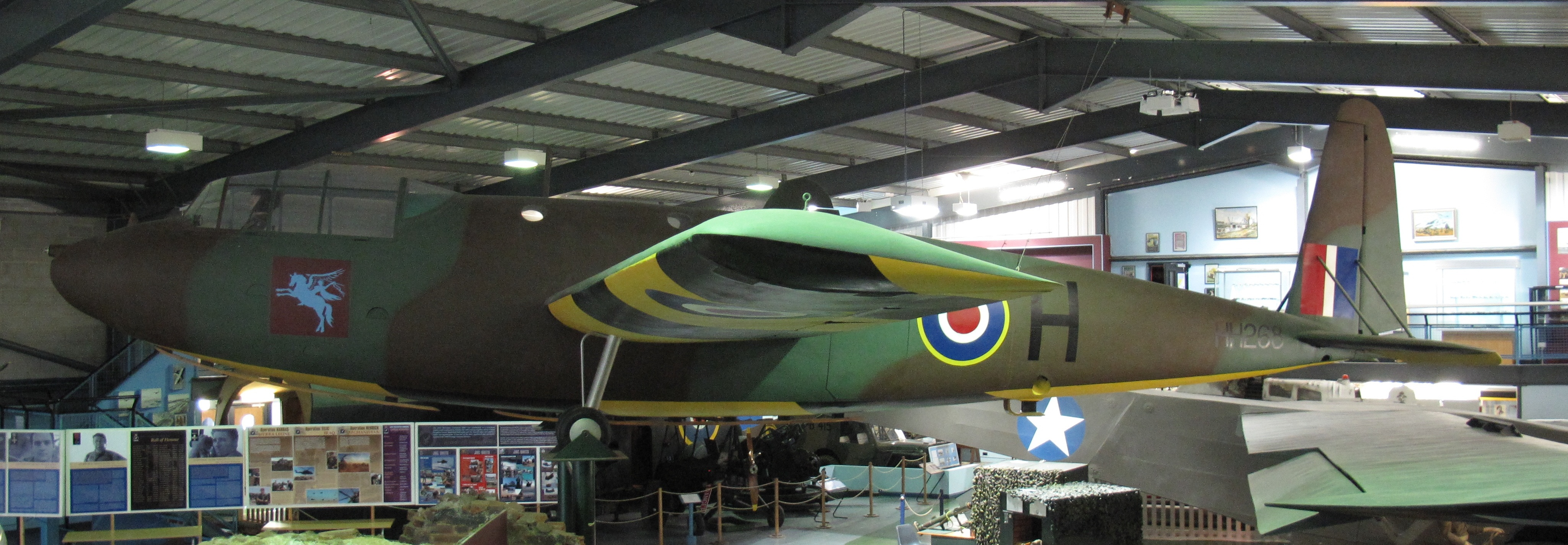
Museum of Army Flying.

Pickup served in the British Army from 1960 to 1994 mainly as a helicopter pilot with the Army Air Corps. In 1984 he was awarded the Order of the British Empire (OBE). He became chief of staff and regimental colonel Army Air Corps, a position which he relinquished in 1992. He was replaced by Colonel William McMahon. He is a former director of The Museum of Army Flying.

== Civilian life ==
Pickup was secretary of the Royal Warrant Holders Association from 1996 to 2007. He was made a lieutenant (LVO) of the Royal Victorian Order in the 2007 New Year Honours.

== See also ==
- List of Old Abingdonians
