= William Mitchell Grundy =

William Mitchell Grundy (1881–1960) was an English headmaster.

W M Grundy (born 13 November 1881) was the son of William Grundy, dean and fellow of Worcester College, Oxford, and headmaster of Malvern College, William Mitchell Grundy was educated at Malvern College and was elected Bible clerk at All Souls College, Oxford. He was headmaster of Abingdon School for 34 years (1913–47), having been classical sixth-form master at Oakham School and housemaster at Loretto School. On retiring, the school built a cottage on site for him, called Heathcot, and the Upper Library was named after him as the Grundy Library in 1963 which was opened by Princess Margaret during the same year.

Grundy was a member of Berkshire County Council (1922–31 and 1949–55) and Abingdon Borough Council (1947–54). At Oxford he played chess for the university (1901–03) as well as golf (1903–04). He died on 16 November 1960.
