= Thomas Godwyn (scholar) =

Thomas Godwyn D.D. (1587–20 March 1642) was an English headmaster and scholar.

== Biography ==
He was the second son of Anthony Godwyn of Wookey, Somerset. He entered Magdalen College, Oxford, at the age of fifteen and between 1604 and 1610 was a demy of the college. He graduated BA on 24 January 1607 and proceeded MA on 11 October 1609.

Godwyn became the first fellow of the newly founded Pembroke College, Oxford (1624), became chaplain to the Bishop of Bath and Wells and rector of Brightwell, Berkshire (1626–43).

== Writings ==
Godwyn was a voluminous writer, and about 1614 he published Florilegium Phrasicon and Romanae Historiae Anthologia (an English treatise on Roman antiquities), both for use by Abingdon School. These were the only school text books on the subject for a century. He also wrote a Synopsis of Hebrew Antiquities, and in 1625 Moses and Aaron, or Civil and Ecclesiastical Rites Used by the Ancient Hebrews. In his preface to Roman Antiquities, Godwyn gives a picture of the difficulties of writing his book in the noisy surroundings of the school room. "If it fail to please, put it down to the whispered chatterings of the noisy boys amongst whom the work had its origin; but if approved ascribe it to the continuous questionings of the boys."
