= Michael Hill (English cricketer) =

English cricketer (born 1951)

Personal information
- Full name: Michael John Hill
- Born: 1 July 1951 (age 75); Harwell, Berkshire, England
- Batting: Left-handed
- Role: Wicket-keeper

Domestic team information
- Years: Team
- 1973–1976: Hampshire

Career statistics
Competition	First-class	List A
Matches	6	4
Runs scored	68	20
Batting average	17.00	20.00
100s/50s	–/–	–/–
Top score	27*	11*
Catches/stumpings	9/–	2/1
- Source: Cricinfo, 14 December 2009

Michael John Hill (born 1 July 1951) is an English former first-class cricketer.

Hill was born in July 1951 at Harwell, Berkshire. He was educated at Abingdon School where he was coached by ex-England cricketer Gerald Smithson. He initially played for the junior fifteen rugby side and rugby sevens team in 1965 and 1966 before winning the Single Wicket Cricket Competition Cup in the summer of 1965. He was selected to play for the Southern Counties cricket team as wicketkeeper, in 1969 and 1970 and was the School's first XI captain in 1970.

Shortly after completing his education, Hill joined the staff at Hampshire in 1970 as wicket-keeping understudy to Bob Stephenson. Having played for the Hampshire Second XI since 1970, Hill eventually made his senior debut in a first-class match against the touring West Indians at Southampton in 1973. Stephenson's presence in the Hampshire side continued to limit his first team opportunities, with him making a further five first-class appearances up to 1976. In his six first-class matches, he scored 68 runs at an average of exactly 17, with a highest score of 27 not out; as a wicket-keeper, he took nine catches. In addition to playing first-class cricket, Hill also made four List A one-day appearances from 1975 to 1976. He scored 20 runs with a highest score of 11 not out in these matches, whilst taking two catches and making a single stumping. He remained on the Hampshire staff until the end of the 1976 season, but left following the arrival of Bobby Parks.
