= Ben Gannon (cricketer) =

English cricketer

- Born: 5 September 1975 (age 50); Oxford

Benjamin Ward Gannon (born 5 September 1975) is an English cricketer. He is a right-handed batsman and a right-arm medium-fast bowler.

== Education ==
He was educated at Abingdon School. He was the leading wicket taker for the School's first XI in 1993 taking 46 wickets at an average of 10.37 and was awarded Colours that season.

== Cricket career ==
Gannon's debut in the Second XI championship came courtesy of a Gloucestershire XI match against Middlesex, however, Gannon took no part in the match, at no time being called to bat or bowl.

In his first-class debut for Gloucestershire in May 1999, in a County Championship match against Glamorgan, he bowled six wickets for eighty runs in his very first innings, despite seeing his team go down by 172 runs. He was to follow this up in the second innings by the wicket of Adrian Dale, who had made 113 runs before succumbing to a catch.

Playing for Gloucestershire in First Class and List A cricket between 1999 and 2002, he later switched to Middlesex, who, at the time he moved in mid-2002, were in the second division, but with whom he managed to secure a place into Division One.

He had previously represented Gloucestershire in matches against International "A"-teams, Sri Lanka and New Zealand in 1999 and 2000.

== Retirement ==
Gannon became a sports teacher at Wycliffe College and has a weekly column for the Stroud News and Journal local newspaper. He also plays cricket for Frocester Cricket Club in the West of England Premier League along with Mark Hardinges and Nick Trainor. In 2015 he was a commercial sports manager at Wycliffe College and a business development manager for Red Rainbow Cricket.

== See also ==
- List of Old Abingdonians
