= The Independent Game Developers' Association =

Video game trade association

- Abbreviation: TIGA
- Formation: 2001
- Type: Trade association
- Chairman: Jason Kingsley
- Website: tiga.org

The Independent Game Developers' Association (TIGA) is a trade association representing the business and commercial interests of some video and computer game developers in the UK and Europe.

TIGA aims to strengthen the games development and digital publishing sector by advocating for the industry, championing it in the media, and by offering commercial or educational support to members.

== History ==
The Independent Game Developers' Association (TIGA) was launched in 2001 by Patricia Hewitt (not to be confused with politician Patricia Hewitt). TIGA was a founding member of the European Game Developers Federation (EGDF).

Richard Wilson is the current CEO, succeeding Fred Hasson who held the post since TIGA was founded until the end of 2007.

== Board members ==
The TIGA Board is elected by TIGA members at the TIGA AGM each December. One half of the directors of TIGA must resign before each AGM, although they are free to seek re-election. 12 directors represent independent developers (of which 10 represent full members and 2 represent associate members). A further 4 directors represent publisher developer members.

== Awards ==
Since 2010, TIGA has won 28 business awards, such as Global Business Excellence Awards in 2011, 2012 and 2017, Best Practice Awards 2011, Director of the Year Awards 2011, PRCA Awards 2012, Public Affairs Awards in 2012, The Association Excellence Awards in 2018, Best Professional Development Initiative 2019, Management and Leadership Awards, and accredited till 2022 by Investors in People.
