= John Roysse =

English mercer

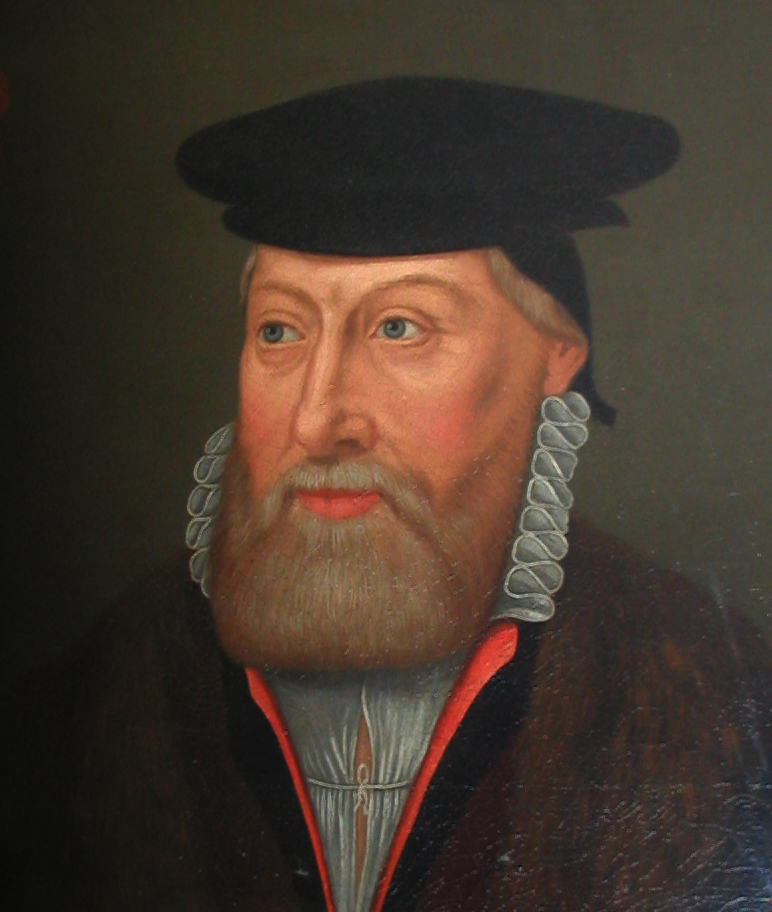
- Photograph of a portrait copy of John Roysse at Abingdon School by unknown artist
- Born: 1500 / 1501; Abingdon, Berkshire
- Died: 1571; London
- Occupations: Mercer, benefactor and financier
- Known for: Benefactor of Abingdon School

John Roysse (1500 or 1501–1571) was an English mercer and benefactor of Abingdon School in Abingdon, Oxfordshire.

== Personal life ==
John Roysse was probably connected with the Roysse family of East Hagbourne but there are few records appertaining to his early life. It is assumed that he attended the abbey school in the grounds of the former Abingdon Abbey. His profession was a dealer in fine cloth, in addition to being a moneylender. He was also a member of the Mercers' Company.

== Roysses and Abingdon School ==
John Roysse signed an indenture, consisting of 31 ordinances, on 31 January 1563, which essentially financed the building of a new schoolroom. Roysse was aged 63 in 1563 so he wanted the schoolroom to measure 15 feet in width and 63 feet in length, in addition to having 63 free scholars. The schoolroom was constructed on the south side of the gateway of the former Abingdon Abbey, on Bridge Street. The school lasted 300 years until it moved to a site near Albert Park (Abingdon School today) in 1870. Abingdon School was also known as Roysses School until the 1960s.

The 1563 room, called the Roysse Room, is still in existence as part of Abingdon Guild Hall.

== See also ==
- List of Old Abingdonians
