= Abingdon School =

Independent school in Oxfordshire, England

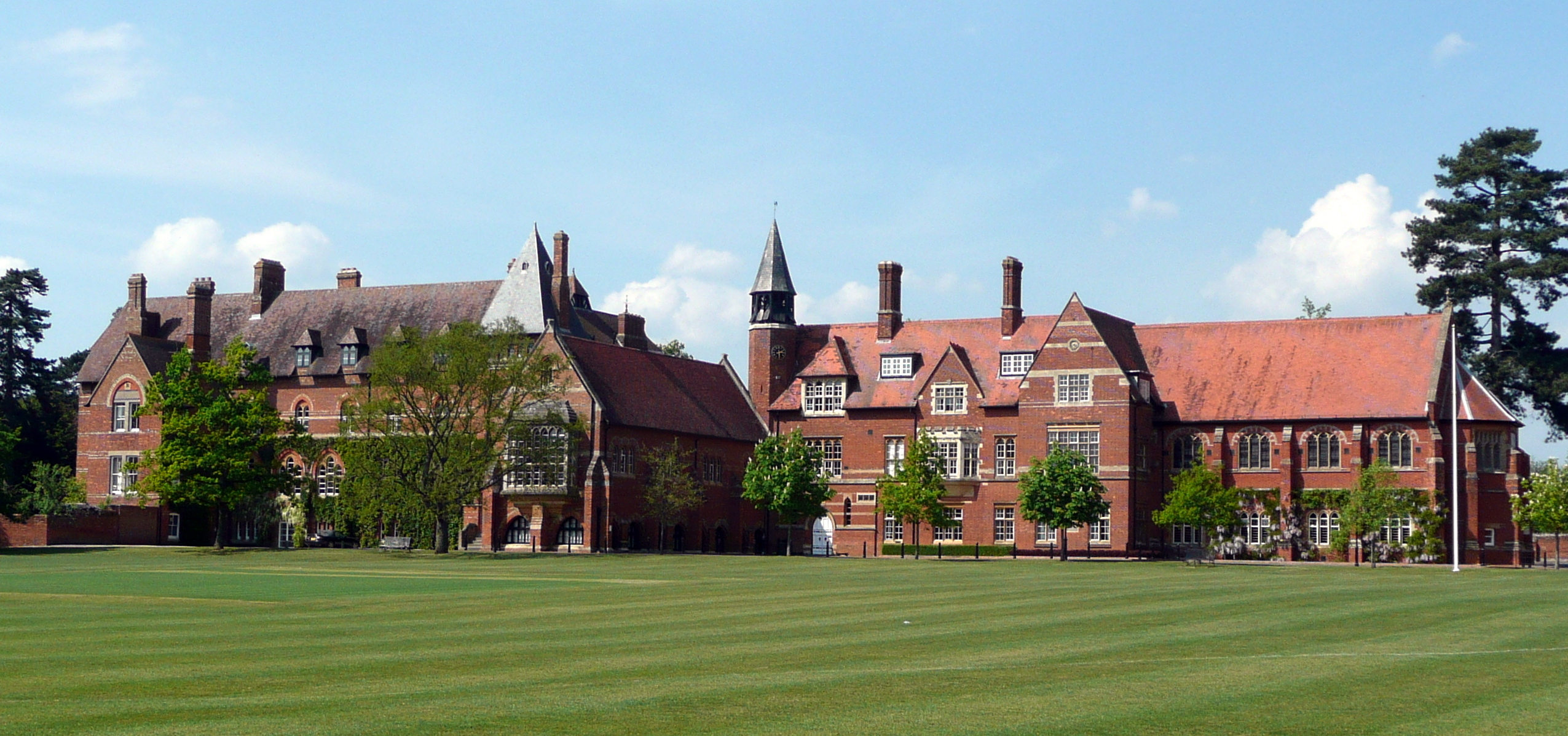

Location
- Park Road; Abingdon-on-Thames, Oxfordshire, OX14 1DE; England; 51°40′23″N 1°17′17″W

Information
- Type: Private day and boarding school
- Motto: Misericordias domini in aeternum cantabo ("I will sing of the Lord's mercy forever")
- Religious affiliation: Church of England
- Established: 1100 (possible foundation); 1256 (earliest reference and endowment); 1563 (re-endowment)
- Founders: Benedictine monks
- Department for Education URN: 123312 Tables
- Headmaster: Michael Windsor
- Gender: Boys (until 2026); Mixed (from 2026)
- Age: 11 to 18
- Enrollment: 1079 (2026)
- Capacity: 1425
  - Boarding: 150 (2026)
- Houses: 10
- Colours: Cerise and white
- Publication: Abingdon News (termly); The Abingdonian (annual); The Griffen (Alumni)
- Alumni: Old Abingdonians
- Boat Club: Abingdon School Boat Club
- Website: abingdon.org.uk

Abingdon School is an independent day and boarding school in Abingdon-on-Thames, Oxfordshire, England. It is the twentieth oldest independent British school. In May 2024, Abingdon announced it would be moving to co-education, and would be fully co-educational by 2030.

== History ==
The date of Abingdon's foundation is unclear. Some believe the school to have been founded prior to the 12th century by the Benedictine monks of Abingdon Abbey, with a legal document of 1100 listing Richard the Pedagogue as the first headmaster. From its early years, the school used a room in St Nicolas' Church, which itself was built between 1121 and 1184.

The school now takes its anniversary from the earliest surviving reference to the school – 1256 – a charter of Abingdon Abbey recording an endowment by Abbot John de Blosneville for the support of thirteen poor scholars. In the past, though, the school considered itself as having been founded by John Roysse in 1563. This led to the unusual circumstance whereby the school celebrated its 400th anniversary in 1963, and then its 750th in 2006.

By the time of Blosneville's endowment in 1256 the school had moved to a couple of rooms in Stert Street, with a house for boarders at 3 Stert Street under the charge of a Dionysia Mundy. With John Roysse's re-endowment of 1563, the school moved to a site south of the Abbey gateway. Roysse was a prosperous mercer in the City of London, and through this association the school has received substantial benefactions from the Worshipful Company of Mercers. The name Roysse's School was commonly used until the 1960s.

After the dissolution of Abingdon Abbey in 1538 the school passed through a difficult phase: the sixteenth century endowments by Old Abingdonians attempted to overcome the loss of monastic support. Thomas Tesdale, who had been a pupil in 1563, made provision for an Usher to teach six poor scholars from the Borough of Abingdon and offered support for thirteen Abingdon pupils to study at Oxford. This benefaction eventually developed into Pembroke College in 1624 by the refoundation of Broadgates Hall.

The six poor scholars, known as Bennett Boys, or colloquially as the Gown Boys owing to their dress, were financed by another Old Abingdonian, William Bennett. Between 1609 and 1870 the school maintained a dual management: the Headmaster, appointed by the Mayor and Corporation, and the Tesdale Usher and Bennett Scholars appointed by the Master and Governors of Christ's Hospital, Abingdon. Despite being penalised during and after the English Civil War for its royalist and Anglican tendencies the school survived and achieved somewhat of a revival under headmaster Robert Jennings (1657–1683). In 1671 ten boys were expelled after they refused to attend Anglican services at St Helen's church.

The school experienced a successful period during the 18th century under headmaster Thomas Woods (1716–1753), known as "Flogging Tom". At the turn of the century the school entered a period of decline under the leadership of the "incompetent" headmaster Dr John Lempriere. As a consequence Pembroke College, Oxford, used the Oxford University Act 1854 as an excuse to cut its links with the school.

The current school site in the Victorian quarter of Abingdon, adjacent to Albert Park, was designed by Edwin Dolby and was built from 1870. Its architecture was described in The Builder that year as externally "of a simple character, the local material of red brick and tile being the chief material employed, relieved by bands of Bath stone". Extensions to the 1870 buildings were added in 1880. In 1901 a chapel and gymnasium were built. The adjacent Waste Court property was acquired in 1928. The Science School came in 1952 and in 1963, to mark the Quatercentenary of the school's refoundation, the big schoolroom was reordered as the Grundy Library (opened by Princess Margaret), together with erection of further buildings east of the Science Wing, the whole becoming known as Big School.

The site houses the chapel, lower school and School House, along with several other dayboy houses and classrooms. The bell tower is still in use and the fields in front of it are used for playing rugby union and cricket.

Together with the School of St. Helen and St. Katherine, Abingdon School has had an exchange with the Ratsgymnasium Bielefeld in the German city of Bielefeld since 1967. In 1980 the Amey Theatre and Arts' Centre was opened and the Sports Centre opened in 1984. Mercers Court was opened in 1994 by the Chancellor of Oxford University and Visitor of Pembroke College, Baron Jenkins of Hillhead.

On 4 October 2008 the newly completed Sports Centre was opened by MP Kate Hoey. This multimillion-pound project took five years to complete and increased the floorspace of the school by 40%. Plans for the complex were formally launched by Princess Anne on 15 September 2006.

In 2010 the Good Schools Guide called it "an impressive school which does what it sets out to do well", also noting that it was "likely to increase in popularity because of its location and increasingly sparkly achievements".

In September 2010 Felicity Lusk replaced Mark Turner as Head of Abingdon. She became the first female head of a boys' public boarding school. The school won the Princess Elizabeth Challenge Cup at Henley Royal Regatta three years running from 2011 to 2013 and reached the later stages of the Daily Mail U18 rugby cup.

In 2015 the Yang Science Centre, designed by Hopkins Architects, opened in October, housing 21 laboratories, study areas and prep rooms. The previous science building was refurbished in 2016, with new rooms for history, geography and classics and new sports facilities were installed at Tilsley Park. In 2016 Lusk was replaced by Michael Windsor.

In 2018 a new development called Beech Court, housing a new library, Sixth Form Centre and art facilities was completed and opened in November. In 2020 a further development called Faringdon Lodge (containing Economics, Business and Computer Science) was completed.

In 2022 major work began on extending the boarding houses of Austin House, Crescent House and School House In 2022 the school was described as "highly selective, strongly academic" in The Tatler School Guide. A new dining/social space called the Pavilion opened in 2023.

On 13 May 2024, Abingdon School announced that it, and Abingdon Prep School, would be becoming co-educational. The prep school is set to admit females to its pre-prep (Reception–Year 2) at its prep school from September 2024 and to Years 3–6 in September 2025. The senior school will admit females to Year 7 and Year 12 from September 2026. The school is set to be fully co-educational by 2030.

== Pupils and houses ==
As of 2025 the school had approximately 1,072 pupils aged 11–18, of whom around 140 were boarders. The school is split into 10 houses, one of which is for boys in years 7 & 8 (Lower School, around 135 boys), three of which are for boarders and dayboys in year 9 and above and six for day boys in year 9 and above. With the exception of Lower School, School House, Austin House and Crescent House, the houses are named after their current Housemasters and are thus prone to change. Boys in Lower School have a pastoral tutor within the house for two years before being redistributed to the 9 senior houses when they move into year 9 and are joined by c. 100 boys from other schools. In years 9 to 13 (3rd year to Upper 6th), they have the same housemaster but usually three different pastoral tutors, specialising in 3rd year, the GCSE years and then the Sixth-Form years, though this is subject to the particular house and change.

== Extracurricular activities ==
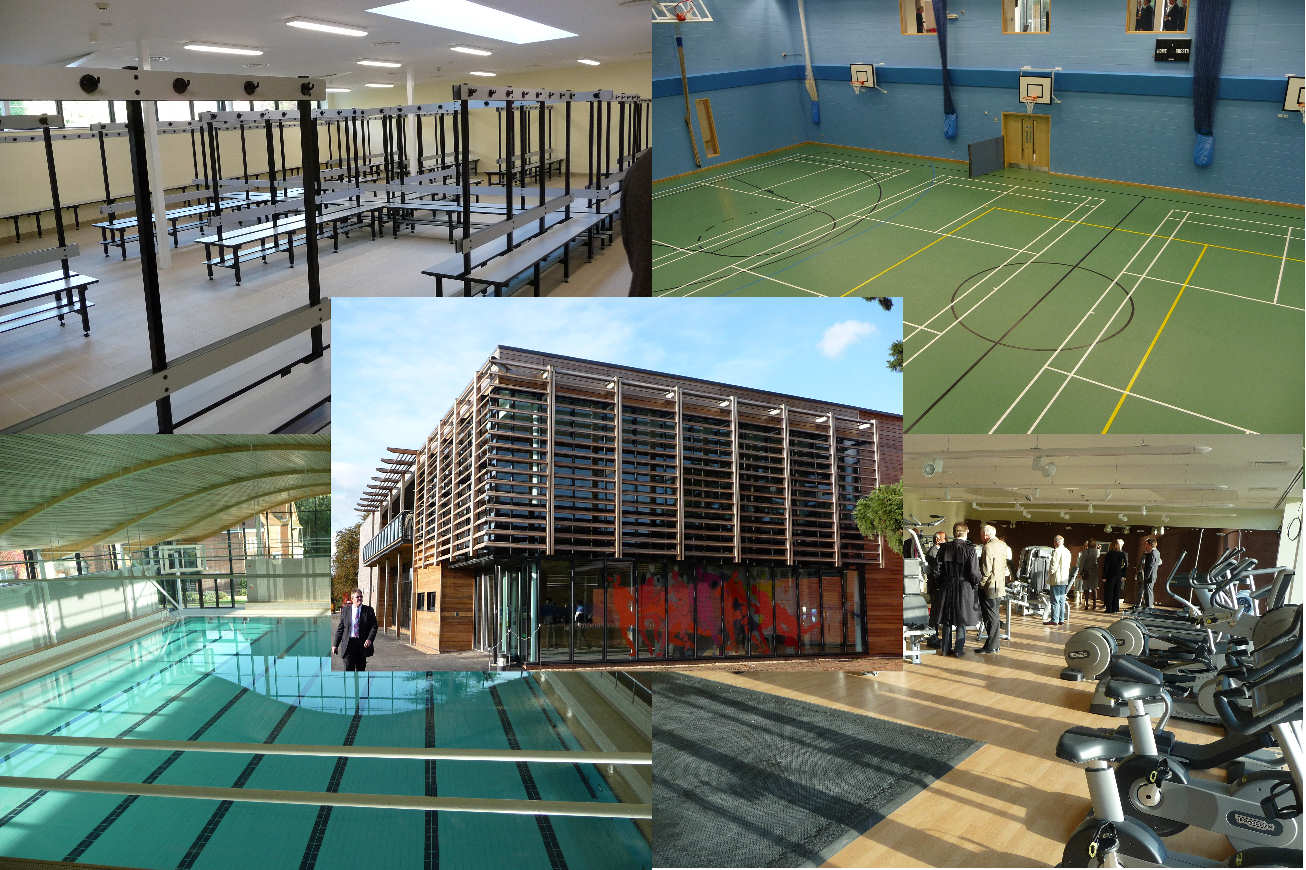
Sports Centre collage of a changing room, sports hall, swimming pool, gym and exterior

The school offers more than 130 extracurricular activities, known as the ‘Other Half’ (of the syllabus).

=== Sport ===
Abingdon's core sports are rowing, rugby union, football, field hockey and cricket. Sport is compulsory at Abingdon School and each pupil must attend at least two sessions per week. The school won the Princess Elizabeth Challenge Cup at Henley Royal Regatta three years running, in 2011, 2012 and 2013. The boat club has documentary evidence that rowing was a school activity in 1830. Roysse's School Rowing Club (1840) became the Abingdon School Boat Club.

=== Non-sporting activities ===
The Debating Society is the school's oldest non-sporting society, founded in 1904. Abingdon takes part in a variety of national competitions, including the Oxford Schools' Debating Competition and foreign language debating competitions. The School's Edmund and Roysse Societies hold talks several times a term, inviting speakers to lecture on a range of subjects.

The school's publications include The Abingdonian (founded 1880), the termly Abingdon News and the annual Griffen for alumni in addition to student publications. The school has a Combined Cadet Force, which consists of RAF and Army sections.

The Abingdon Film Unit (AFU), formed in 2003 by teacher Jeremy Taylor and alumni filmmaker Michael Grigsby, has created more than 200 films.

== Academic ==
At A Level, the 2017 A*–A percentage averaged 63.3% At GCSE, the A* percentage in 2017 was 60.2% and the A*–A percentage 86.3%. In 2023, 70% scored A*–A for A Levels and 81% scored 9–7 for GCSEs.

Most of the GCSE equivalent courses follow the iGCSE (international GCSE) syllabuses and all examinations are taken in year 11 (5th year), i.e. there is no early take of qualifications even for top sets. The top two Maths sets at GCSE follow the iGCSE and Additional Maths qualifications. In the sixth form, A Levels are followed to AS and then A2 level, but following the reforms put in place under Michael Gove the school decided that from September 2015 it would follow a linear system (i.e. courses will be completed over two years) and not offer the stand-alone AS qualification. Some departments offer the Cambridge pre-U course instead of the traditional A Level.

== Headteachers (since 1600) ==
Head	Years active
John Birde	1600–1605
Degory Wheare	1605–1606
Edward Groome	1606–1608
Thomas Godwyn	1608–1625
Anthony Huish	1625–1654
Edmund Slye	1654–1654
Robert Payne	1654–1655
John Kerridge	1655–1657
Robert Jennings	1657–1683
Richard Playdell	1684–1716
Thomas Woods	1716–1753

Head	Years active
Humphrey Humphreys	1753-1753
John Abbot	1753–1758
Henry Bright	1758–1774
Andrew Portal	1774–1775
William Kennedy	1775–1792
John Lemprière	1792–1809
Edward Nicholson	1810–1827
Joseph Hewlett	1828–1839
William Alder Strange	1840–1868
Edmund Harper	1868–1870
Edgar Summers	1870–1883

Head	Years active
William Herbert Cam	1883–1893
Thomas Layng	1893–1913
William Mitchell Grundy	1913–1947
James Cobban	1947–1970
Eric Anderson	1970–1975
Michael St John Parker	1975–2001
Mark Turner	2002–2010
Felicity Lusk	2010–2016
Michael Windsor	2016–

== Gallery ==
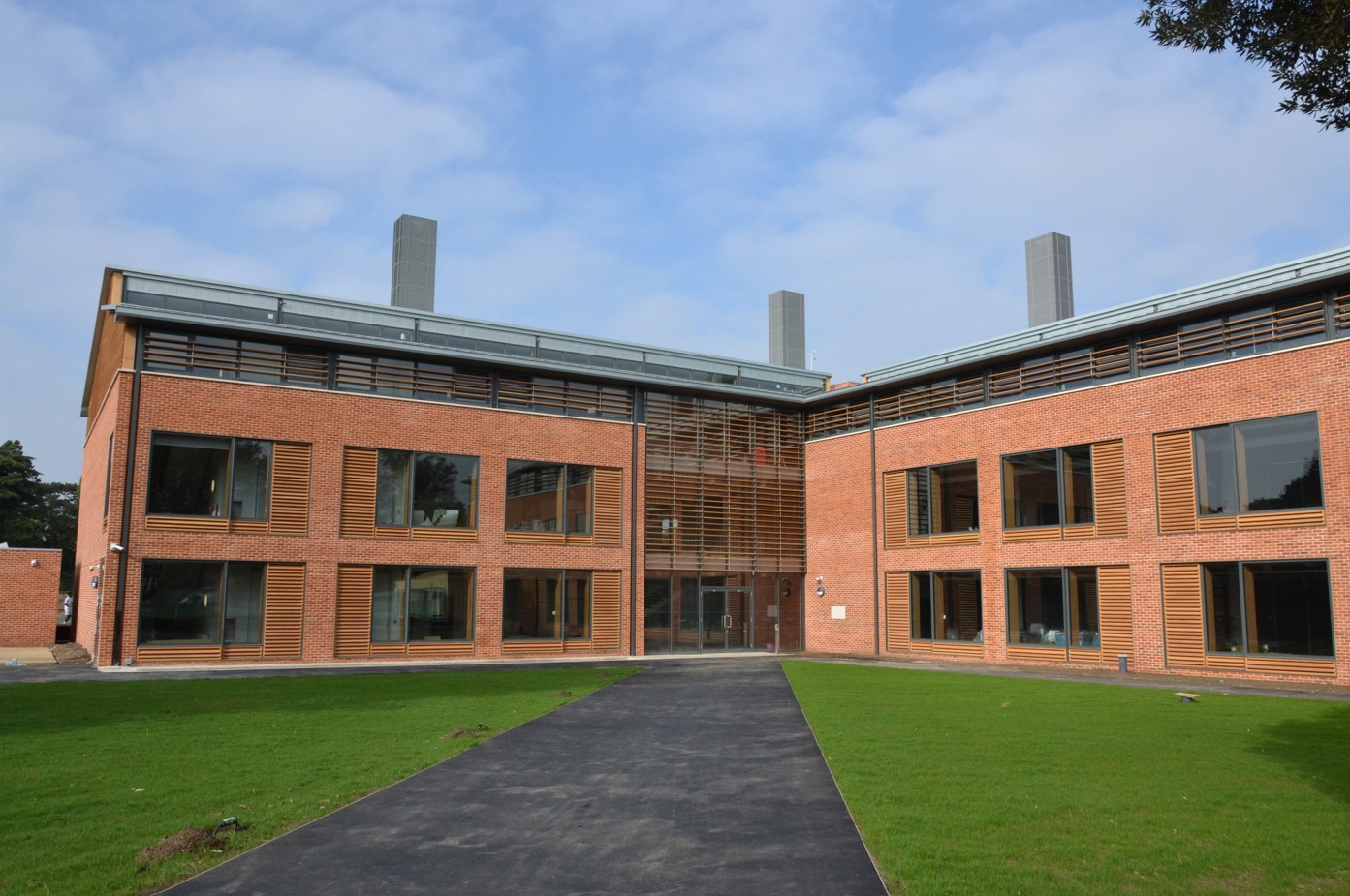
Science Centre

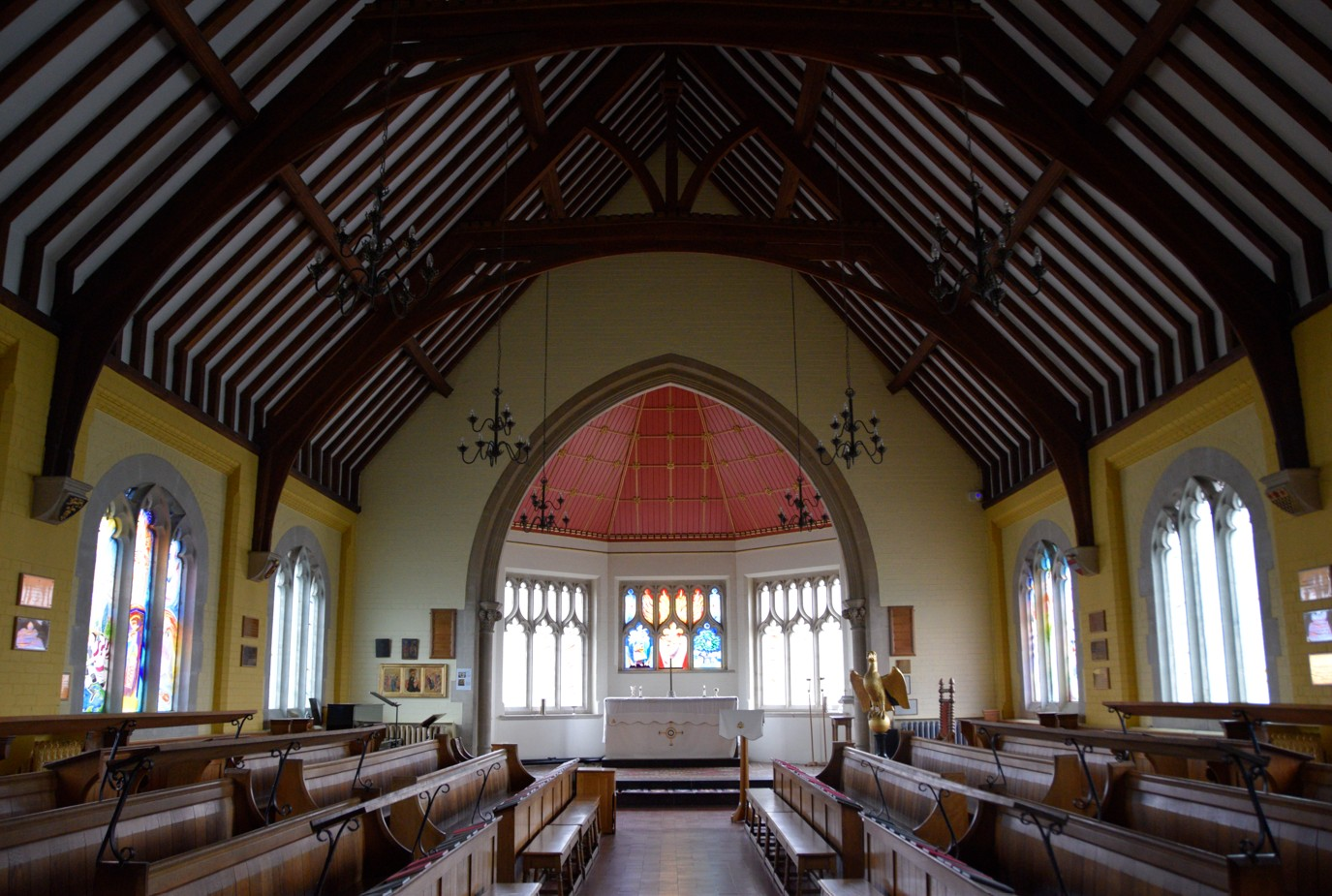
Chapel

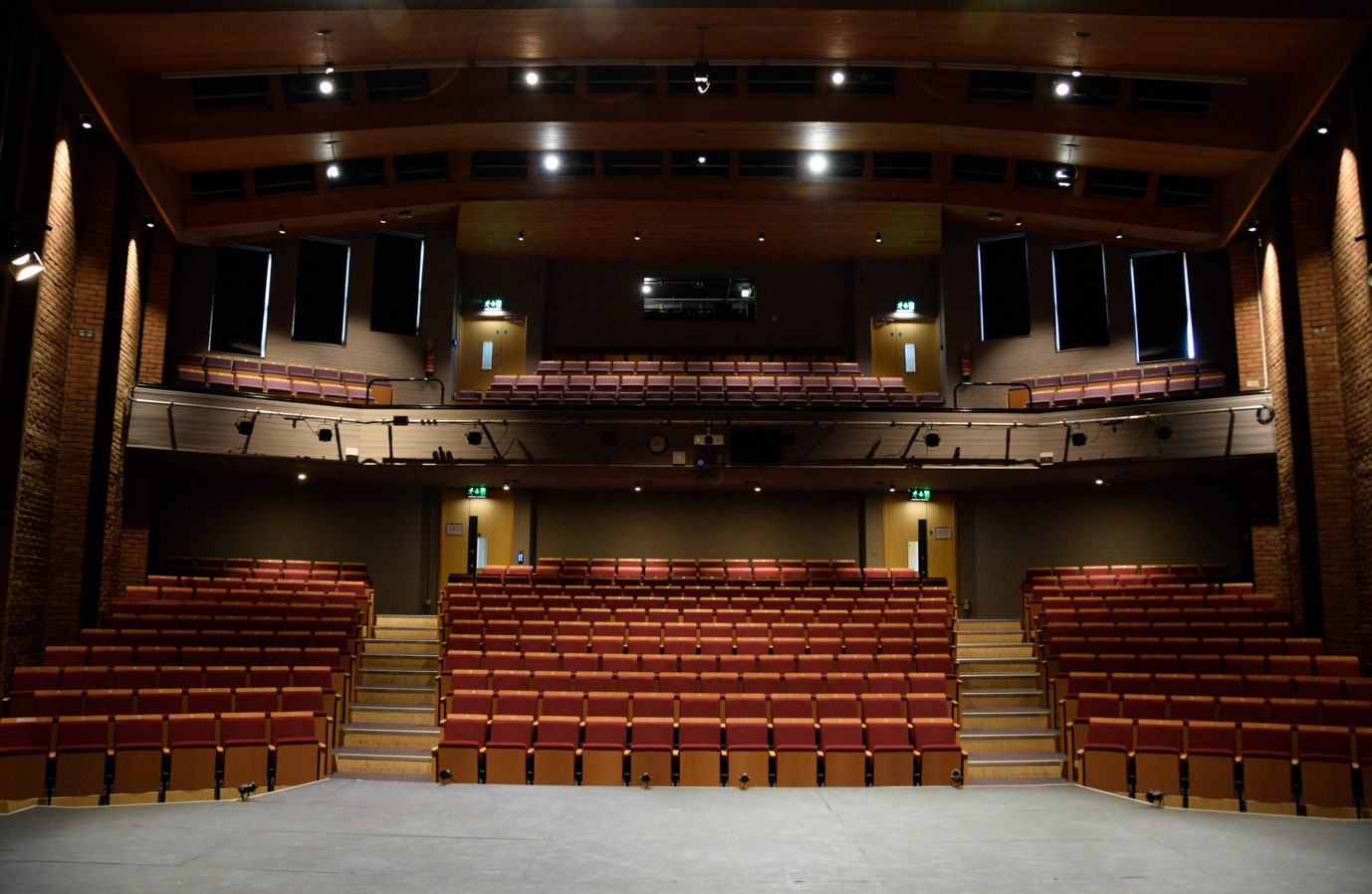
Amey Theatre

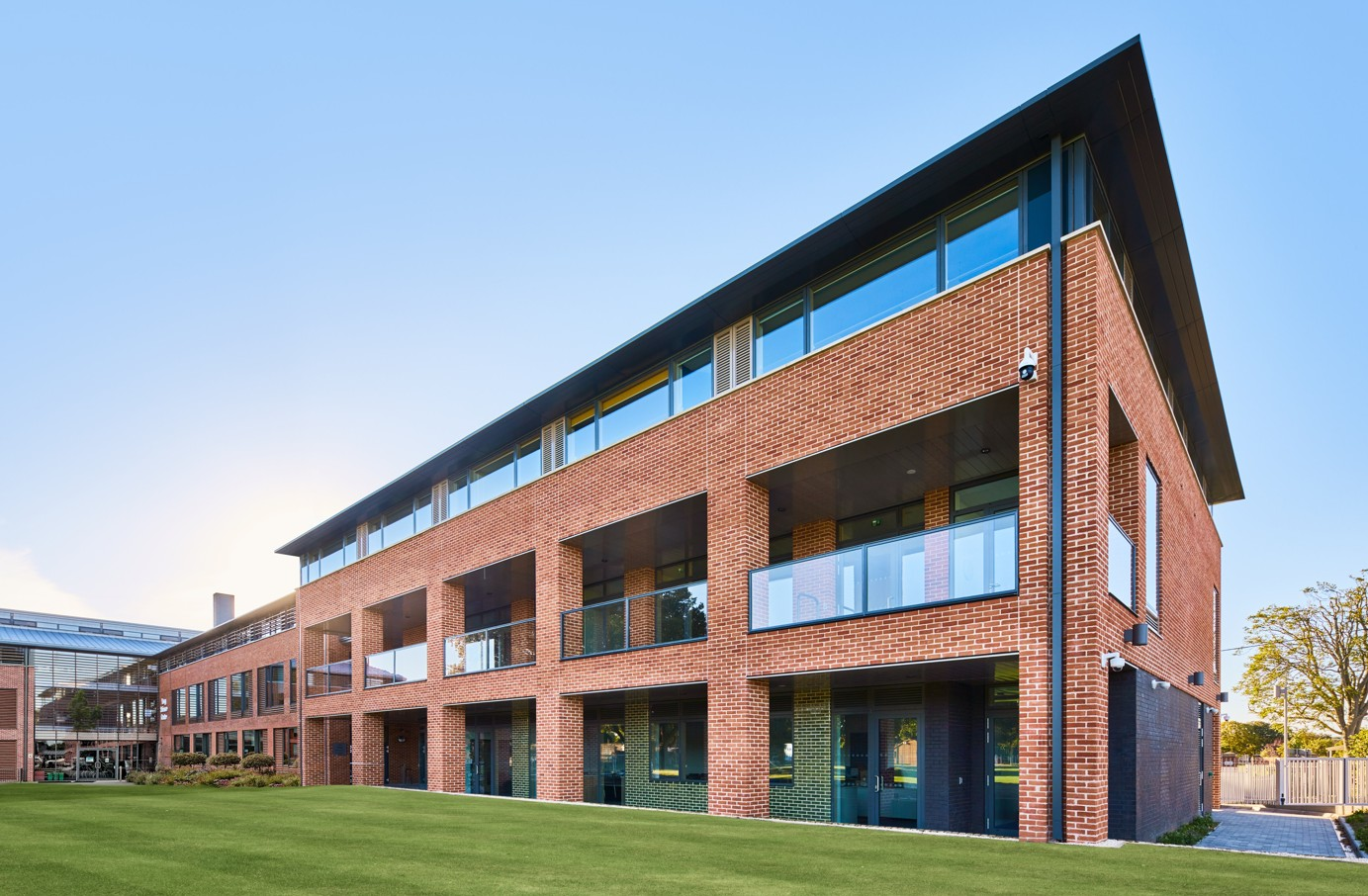
Faringdon Lodge

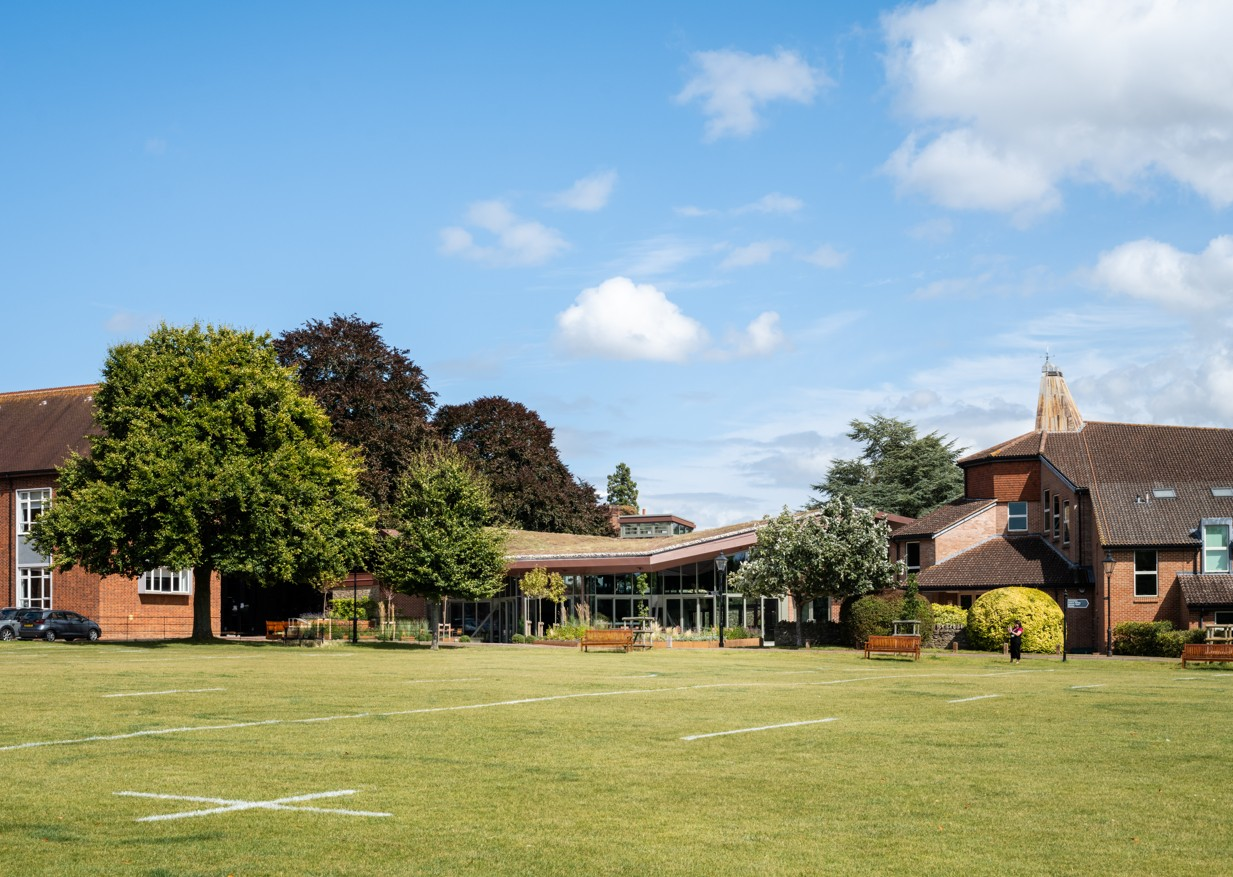
Pavilion and Amey Theatre

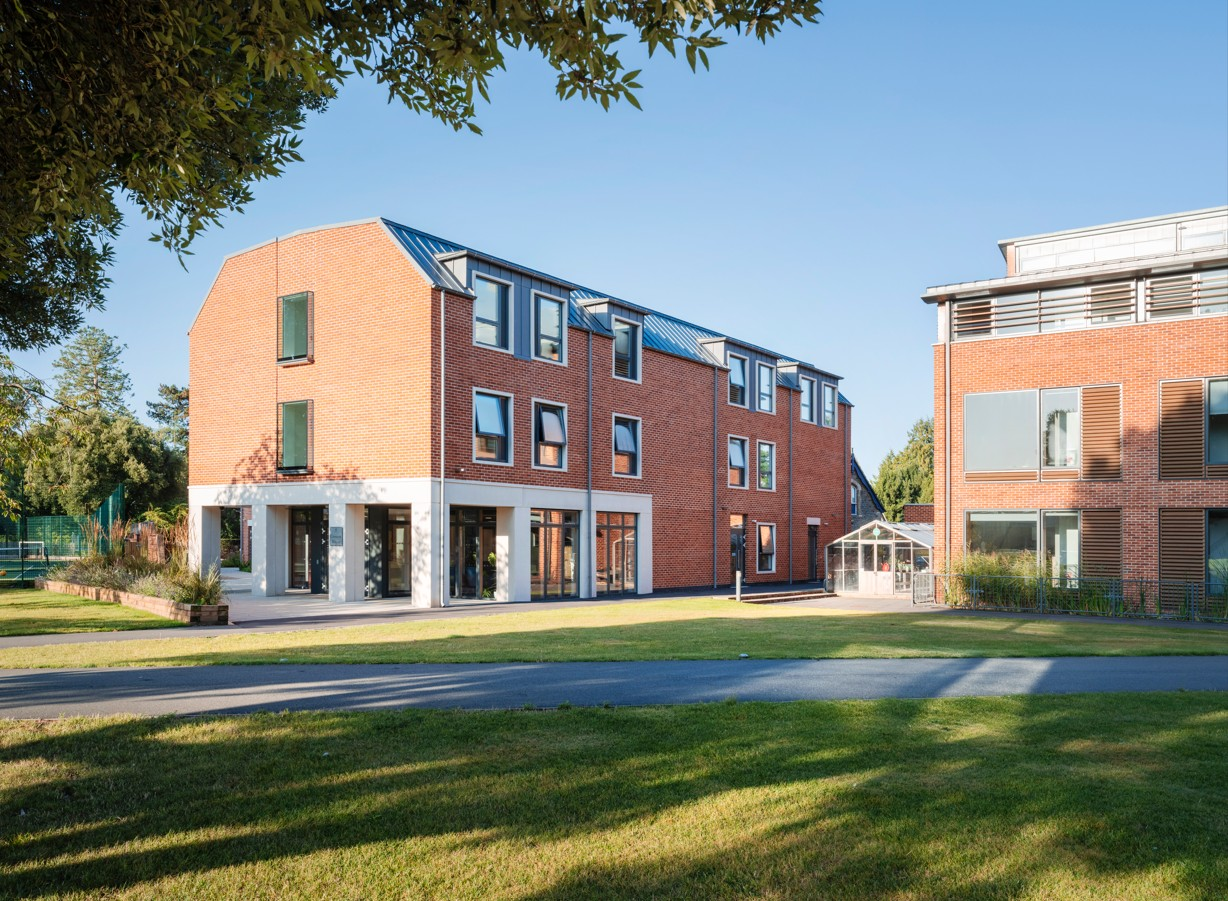
Crescent House

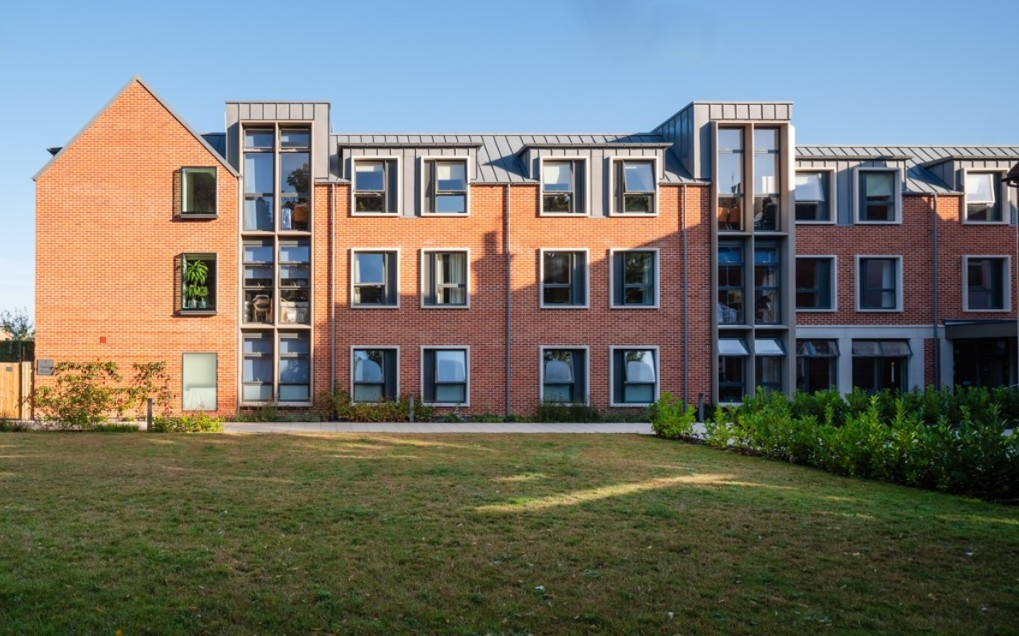
Austin House

== See also ==
- The Master Singers, a vocal group in the 1960s formed by teachers at the school
- List of English and Welsh endowed schools (19th century)
- List of the oldest schools in the United Kingdom
