= St Peter ad Vincula, South Newington =

Church in Oxfordshire, England

- Parish Church of Saint Peter ad Vincula, South Newington
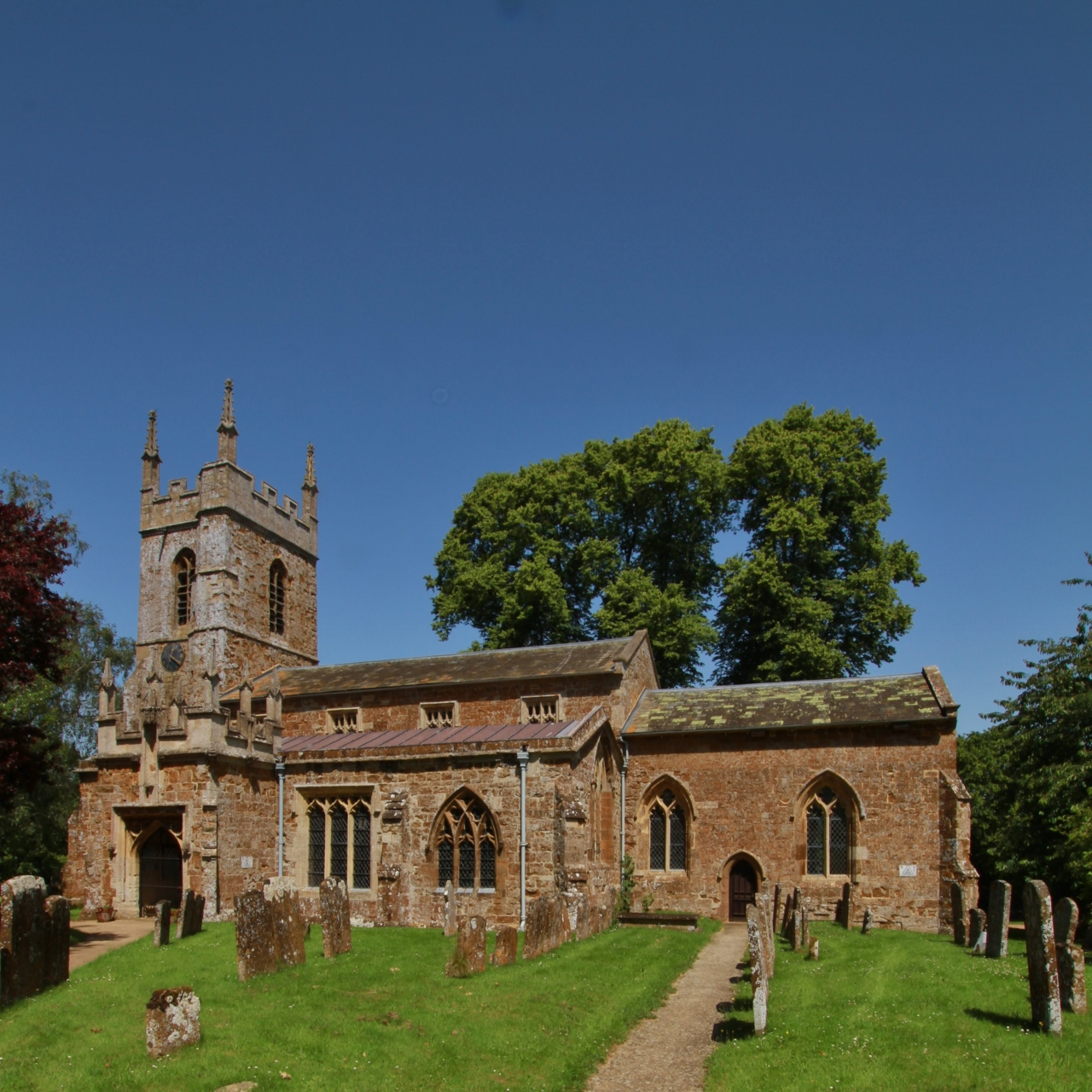
- St Peter ad Vincula, South Newington
- 52°0′10.8″N 1°23′24″W
- OS grid reference: SP 40747 33338
- Location: South Newington, Banbury, Oxfordshire OX15 4JF
- Country: England
- Denomination: Church of England

History
- Dedication: St Peter ad Vincula

Architecture
- Style: Norman, Decorated Gothic and Perpendicular Gothic

Administration
- Province: Canterbury
- Diocese: Oxford
- Archdeaconry: Oxford
- Deanery: Banbury
- Parish: Saint Peter ad Vincula, South Newington

The Parish Church of Saint Peter ad Vincula, South Newington is the Church of England parish church of South Newington, a village about 5 miles (8 km) southwest of Banbury in Oxfordshire. The church is one of only 15 in England dedicated to St Peter ad Vincula ("St Peter in Chains"), after the basilica of San Pietro in Vincoli in Rome.

== Building ==
In the late Norman period South Newington's church had a nave of two bays, plus a north aisle and a chancel. Features that survive form this period include a pair of Norman arches between the nave and north aisle. At the end of the 13th century the church was enlarged in a Decorated Gothic style. The nave was extended with an extra bay in each direction, absorbing the Norman chancel. A new chancel further east, a south aisle and a west tower were all added in the same period. In the second half of the 15th century a clerestory and ornate south porch were added.

The tower had a clock by 1560. The present clock was formerly at St Mary's Church, Banbury, was made by Joseph Hemmins of Banbury in 1741 and was moved to St Peter ad Vincula in 1895. The tower had several bells by the 16th century. It now has a ring of five bells hung for change ringing. The oldest of the bells, the second, was cast in 1656 by Richard Keene of Woodstock. The treble was cast in 1733 by Henry III Bagley of Chacombe. The third, fourth and fifth were cast in 1861 by George Mears of the Whitechapel Bell Foundry.

The church has been listed Grade I on the National Heritage List for England since December 1955.

== Wall paintings ==
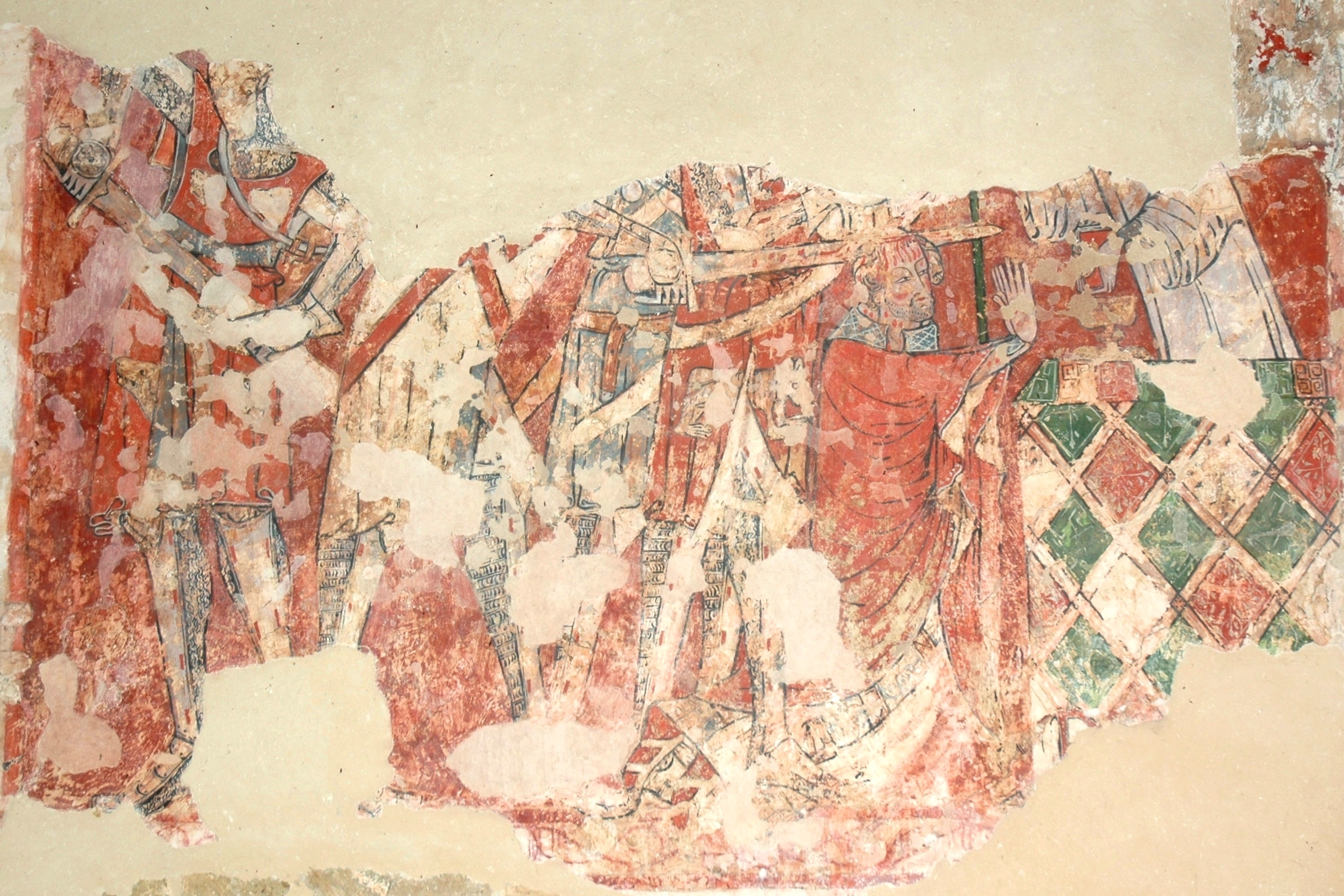
Wall painting of the Martydom of St Thomas Becket, 1330s

Around 1330–40 a set of wall paintings were painted in the north aisle. The medium is oil on plaster, which Sherwood and Pevsner state is unusual for mediaeval wall paintings. Prof. Ernest Tristram described the paintings as "of a nature seldom found in a parish church" and Sherwood and Pevsner considered them to be "the finest group of medieval wall paintings in [Oxfordshire]". Another author commented:

"The north aisle paintings at South Newington are indeed outstanding for their draughtsmanship, wide range and skilful blending of colours, and also for the medium, which is oil; nothing in this part of the country can compare with them for excellence. The unknown artist must have been in the front rank of his profession."

The paintings in the north aisle include a damaged but very fine depiction of the murder of St Thomas Becket. Next to it is a painting of a rare subject, the execution of Thomas Plantagenet, Earl of Lancaster. The east end of the north aisle forms a Lady Chapel whose wall paintings include an Annunciation and an exquisite Virgin and Child. Next to the Virgin and Child is a painting of St James receiving a gift, and beside the east window of the Lady Chapel is one of St Margaret the Virgin slaying a dragon. The inclusion of a Margaret and two Thomases in the paintings, and the Giffard coat of arms in the Annunciation and St James paintings suggests that they were commissioned by Thomas Giffard, lord of one of the manors of South Newington, and his wife Margaret Mortayne. Over the chancel arch there are fragments of a Doom painting from the same period, but very little of it has survived.

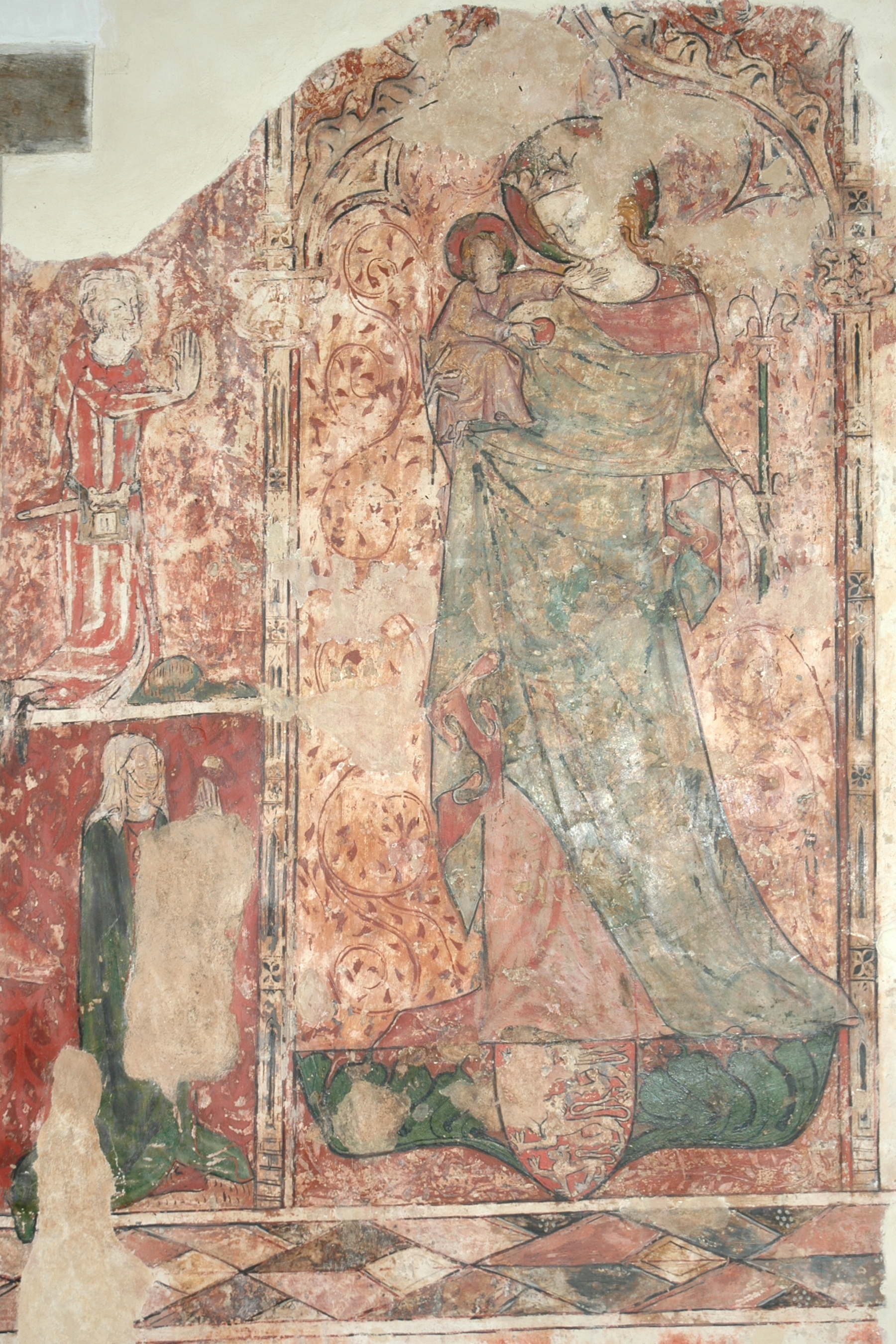
Wall painting of the Virgin Mary & infant Jesus, 1330s

Late in the 15th or early in the 16th century, after the clerestory was built, a Passion Cycle was painted in the nave above the arches to the north aisle. Its artistry is not of the same standard as the paintings in the north aisle, but it is of interest and some of its pictures show scenes not seen in passion cycles elsewhere. All the paintings in St Peter ad Vincula had been hidden under whitewash for several centuries. Those in the north aisle and over the chancel arch were uncovered in 1893, and the Passion cycle in the nave was uncovered in 1931.

== Benefice ==
St Peter ad Vincula was granted to the Benedictine abbey at Eynsham in the 1160s, and remained one of its possessions until the abbey was suppressed in the dissolution of the monasteries in 1538. In 1565 the advowson was passed to Exeter College, Oxford, which retained it until 1979. St Peter ad Vincula is now part of a single Church of England benefice with the parishes of Bloxham and Milcombe.

== Gallery ==
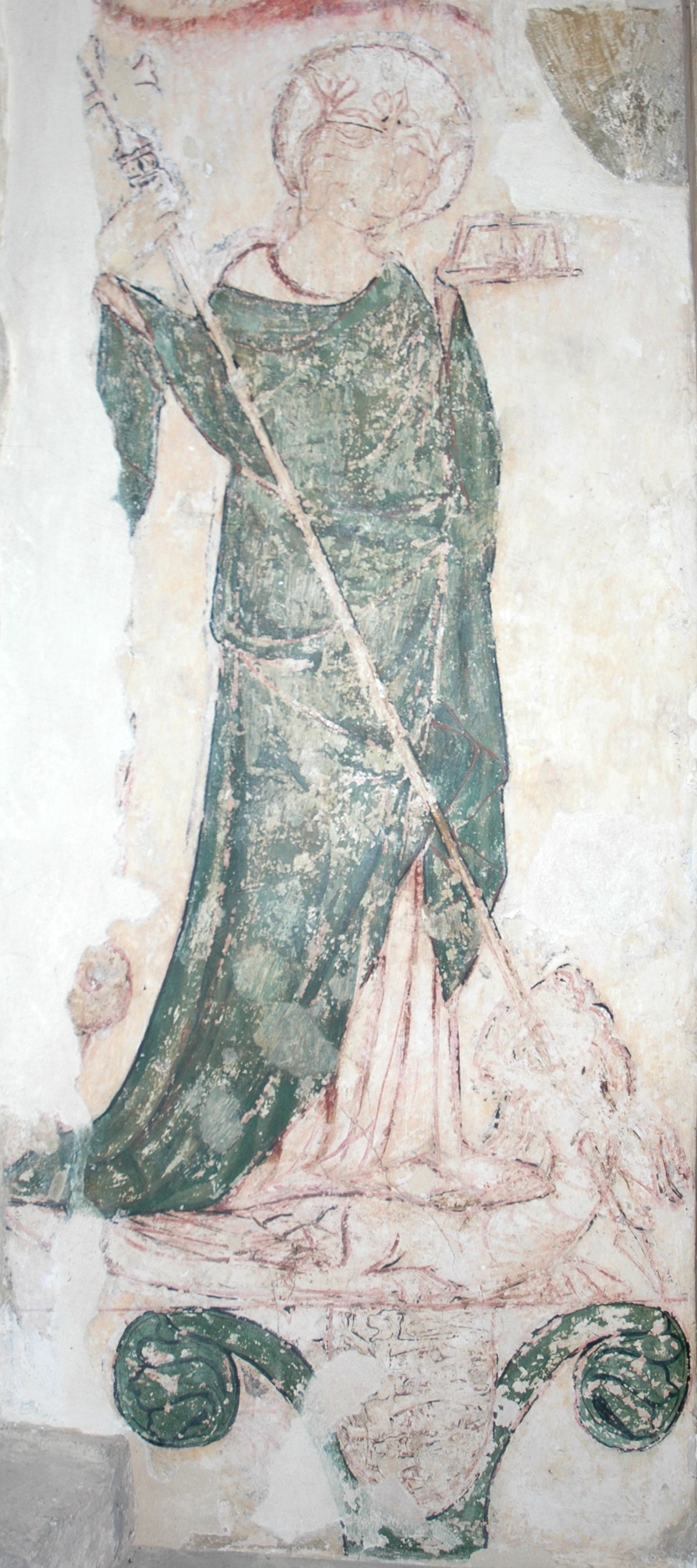
Wall painting of St Margaret the Virgin, 1330s

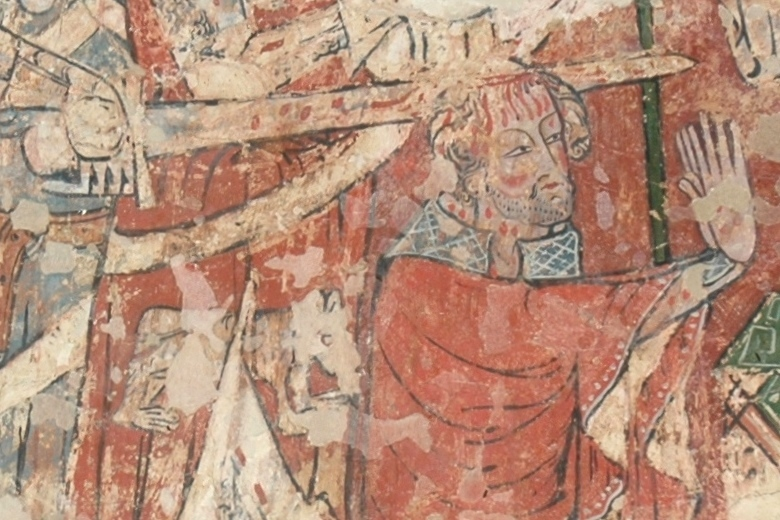
Detail of wall painting of Martydom of St Thomas Becket

== Sources and further reading ==
- Beeson, C.F.C. (1989) [1962]. Simcock, A.V. (ed.). Clockmaking in Oxfordshire 1400–1850 (3rd ed.). Oxford: Museum of the History of Science. p. 20. ISBN 0-903364-06-9.
- Crossley, Alan, ed. (1983). "Parishes: South Newington". A History of the County of Oxford. Victoria County History. Vol. 11: Wootton Hundred (northern part). pp. 143–159.
- Long, E.T. (1972). "Medieval Wall Paintings in Oxfordshire Churches". Oxoniensia. XXXVII. Oxfordshire Architectural and Historical Society: 86–90.
- Sherwood, Jennifer; Pevsner, Nikolaus (1974). Oxfordshire. The Buildings of England. Harmondsworth: Penguin Books. pp. 771–773. ISBN 0-14-071045-0.
- Tristram, Ernest (1954). English Medieval Wall Painting: The 14th Century. London: Oxford University Press for The Pilgrim Trust.
- Walker, George Graham (1975). Churches of the Banbury Area. Kineton: Roundwood Press. pp. 37–39. ISBN 0-900093-52-8.
- A Guide to St Peter ad Vincula South Newington. St Peter ad Vincula Parish Church.
