= Charles Peers (disambiguation) =

Charles Peers (1661–1737) was an English businessman who was chairman of the East India Company and Lord Mayor of London.

Charles Peers may also refer to:

- Charles Peers (barrister) (1776–1853), English barrister and High Sheriff of Oxfordshire
- Charles Reed Peers (1868–1952), English architect and preservationist
- Charles Ernest Peers (1875–1944), Irish-born South African artist

== See also ==
- Charles Peers Davidson, Canadian lawyer and judge
