= Ball flower =

Architectural ornament

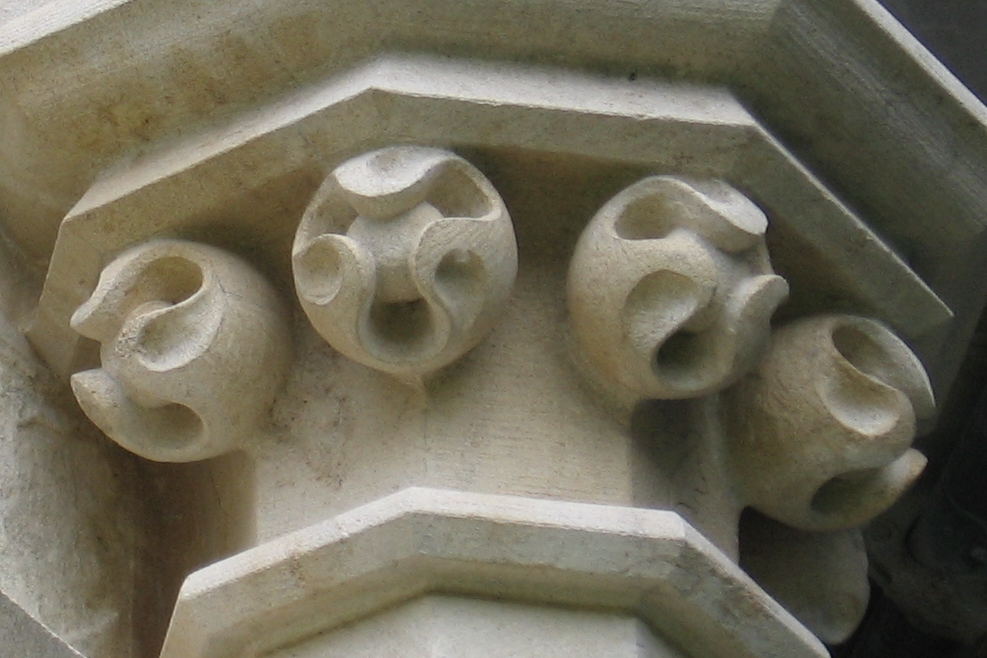
Ball-flower ornamentation at Gloucester Cathedral

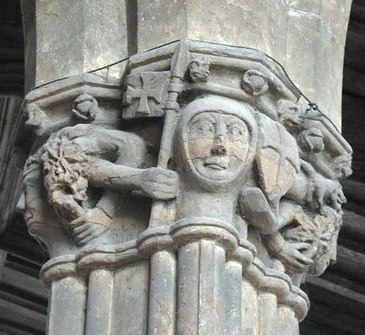
Ball-flowers at the top of a capital in St Mary's Church, Bloxham, in Oxfordshire

The ball-flower (also written ballflower) is an architectural ornament in the form of a ball inserted in the cup of a flower. It came into use in the latter part of the 13th century in England and became one of the chief ornaments of the 14th century, in the period known as Decorated Gothic.

Ball-flowers were generally placed in rows at equal distances in the hollow of a moulding, frequently by the sides of mullions. Examples are found in many churches of the period including Gloucester Cathedral; St Mary's Church, Bloxham; St. Michael's Church, Swaton (c. 1300); and Tewkesbury Abbey (c. 1330). The presence of ball-flowers on the west part of Salisbury Cathedral has helped date this facade to the 14th century.

== Sources ==
- Gardner, Samuel (1922). A guide to English Gothic architecture. The University press.
