= St Mary's Church, Bloxham =

St Mary's, Bloxham
- Our Lady of Bloxham
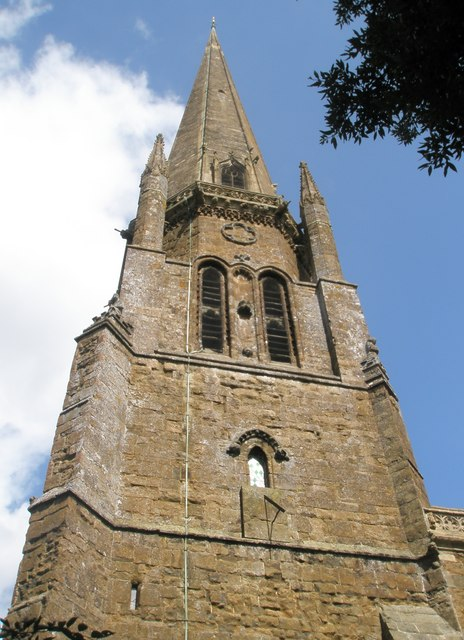
- St Mary's steeple

- Location within Oxfordshire
- 52.0179°N 1.3747°W
- OS grid reference: SP 43011 35679
- Location: Bloxham
- Country: England
- Denomination: Church of England
- Previous denomination: Roman Catholic

History
- Founded: 12th century
- Dedication: St Mary the Virgin

Architecture
- Heritage designation: Grade I listed
- Architect(s): Original unknown Richard Winchcombe; GE Street
- Style: English Gothic

Specifications
- Materials: ironstone rubble

Administration
- Province: Canterbury
- Diocese: Oxford
- Archdeaconry: Dorchester
- Parish: Bloxham

Clergy
- Vicar: Dale Gingrich

The church of Our Lady of Bloxham, informally called St Mary's Bloxham, is the Church of England parish church in Bloxham, Oxfordshire. It is notable for its 14th-century tower and spire, which is the highest in Oxfordshire. It is unusually large for a parish church. The architectural historian Jennifer Sherwood described it as "one of the grandest churches in the country." It is a Grade I listed building.

== Building ==
The earliest record of a church at Bloxham is from AD 1067, when William of Normandy granted it to Westminster Abbey. But the earliest parts of the current building are fragments of 12th-century masonry, including two doorways and the responds of the chancel arch.

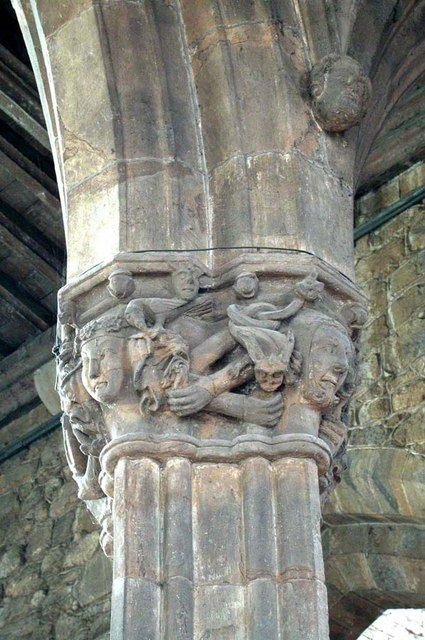
14th-century capital in one of the arcades

The arcades date from the rebuilding of the original nave in the 13th century, but the present building was mainly constructed in the 14th and 15th centuries. The chancel and aisles were rebuilt in the early 14th century, as were the north and south porches. At this time the church was ornamented with much fine stone sculpture, including tracery and ornate capitals, much of which survives. It is likely that it was crafted by a school of masons who carried out similar work on the nearby Oxfordshire churches of Adderbury, Alkerton and Hanwell. The tower is thought to have been built between 1300 and 1340.

Fragments of Mediaeval wall paintings survive inside the church, including a Doom painting over the chancel arch and Saint Christopher over the north doorway. Remnants of 14th-century stained glass survive in some of the windows. The church's elaborate rood screen dates from the 15th century.

In the 15th century the Perpendicular Gothic Milcombe chapel (also known as the south chapel) was added. Although the patron and architect are unknown, it is likely that the new building was designed by Richard Winchcombe. The chapel contains a number of 18th-century monuments to members of the local Thornycroft family and the tomb of Sir John Thornycroft, 1st Baronet.

In 1864–66 the church was restored under the direction of the Gothic Revival architect GE Street. As well as stabilising the spire, Street's work includes the pulpit, choir stalls and reredos. In 1868 Edward Burne-Jones created a stained glass window of St Christopher in the chancel and in 1869 William Morris, Edward Burne-Jones and Philip Webb created the east window.

In 2018 the parish was taken to a Church of England consistory court for having removed seven Victorian pews from the church to create a children's play area without applying to the Diocese of Oxford for the necessary faculty. The Victorian Society testified that the pews had been badly stored, causing them to deteriorate. The court granted retrospective permission for the removal of the pews, but ordered that four of them be returned to the church.

== Bells ==
The church tower has a ring of eight bells. The fifth bell was cast in about 1570, possibly by John Appowell of Buckingham. James Keene of Woodstock cast the tenor bell in 1648. Abel Rudhall of Gloucester cast the sixth bell in 1750. James Barwell & Co of Birmingham cast the treble, second, third and seventh bells in 1903. They are the heaviest ring of change-ringing bells in the World that are rung from the ground floor, inside the church.

The church has also a Sanctus bell that was cast in about 1599, and a service bell that John Warner & Sons of Cripplegate, London cast in about 1899.

== Patronage and use ==
In 1067 William of Normandy granted the church and rectory estate to Westminster Abbey. In the 12th century Henry II granted patronage of the church to Godstow Abbey near Oxford, which led Westminster Abbey to complain to the Pope. However, the Papacy allowed Godstow to retain the church provided it made an annual payment to Westminster Abbey. With Henry VIII's Dissolution of the Monasteries in the 1530s the advowson or patronage of Bloxham parish church passed to Crown, which granted it to Eton College in 1547.

The church has a large graveyard, which has been expanded to the east several times.

Schools in Bloxham use the church for their annual Christmas services. The benefice is now combined with those of Milcombe and South Newington, of which Our Lady of Bloxham is the main church.

== Bibliography ==
- Lobel, Mary D; Crossley, Alan, eds. (1969). "Bloxham". A History of the County of Oxford. Victoria County History. Vol. 9: Bloxham Hundred. London: Oxford University Press for the Institute of Historical Research. pp. 53–85. ISBN 978-0-19722-726-8.
- Sherwood, Jennifer; Pevsner, Nikolaus (1974). Oxfordshire. The Buildings of England. Harmondsworth: Penguin Books. pp. 477–480. ISBN 0-14-071045-0.
