= High Sheriff of Oxfordshire =

English position

The High Sheriff of Oxfordshire, in common with other counties, was originally the King's representative on taxation upholding the law in Saxon times. The word Sheriff evolved from 'shire-reeve'.

The title of High Sheriff is therefore much older than the other crown appointment, the Lord Lieutenant of Oxfordshire, which came about after 1545. Between 1248 and 1566 Berkshire and Oxfordshire formed a joint shrievalty (apart from a brief period in 1258/9). See High Sheriff of Berkshire.

== List of High Sheriffs of Oxfordshire ==
- 1066–1068: Saewold
- 1066–1086: Edwin
- 1087: Svain

=== 12th century ===
- 1100-1135: William
- 1100-1135: Peter
- c. 1130: Restold
- 1131: Robert D'Oyly
- c. 1142–?: William de Chesney
- 1135–1154: Henry de Oxford
- 1155–1159: Henry D'Oyly, 4th Baron Hocknorton
- 1160: Manasser Arsick and Henry D'Oyly, 4th Baron Hocknorton
- 1161–1162: Manasser Arsick
- 1163: Thomas Basset
- 1164–1169: Adam de Catmore
- 1170–1174: Alard Banastre
- 1175–1178: Robert de Tureville
- 1179–1181: (first half): Geoffrey Hose
- 1181: (second half)–1184 (first half): Robert de Whitfield
- 1184: (second half)–1186 (first half): Alanus de Furnell
- 1186: (second half)–1190: Robert de la Mare
- 1187–1194: (first half): William Briwere
- 1194: (second half)–1196: Henry D'Oyly, 5th Baron Hocknorton
- 1197–1199: Hugh de Neville

=== 13th century ===
- 1200–1201 (first half): Gilbert Basset
- 1201 (second half)–1202 (first half): William Briwere
- 1202 (second half)–1214 (first quarter): Thomas Basset
- 1214 (last three-quarters): Ralph de Normanville
- 1215–1223: Falkes de Breauté
- 1223 (last three-quarters)–1224 (first half): Richard de Ripariis (Rivers)
- 1224–1268: Sir Gilbert de Kirkby, also Sheriff for Northamptonshire at same time
- 1224 (second half), 1225 (first quarter): Walter Foliot
- 1225 (last three-quarters)–1231: Godfrey of Crowcombe
- 1232: John de Hulecote (first three-quarters)
- 1232 (last quarter)–1233: Engelard de Cigogné
- 1233 (last quarter)–1235 (first half): John Le Brunn (or John Brunus)
- 1235 (second half)–1238 (first half): John de Tiwe
- 1238 (third quarter): Richard Suhard
- 1238 (last quarter): Paul Peyure
- 1239: John de Plessitis
- 1240–1244 (first quarter): William Hay
- 1244 (last three-quarters)–1247 (first half): Alanus de Farnham
- 1247 (second half)–1248: Guy fitz Robert

=== 1248–1566 ===
See High Sheriff of Berkshire

=== 16th century ===
- 1567: Richard Fines
- 1568: Humphrey Ashfield
- 1569: Richard Taverner of Wood Eaton
- 1570: Thomas Gibbons
- 1571: Richard Wenman of Thame Park and Witney
- 1572: John Danvers
- 1573: Henry Rainford
- 1574: William Babington
- 1575: Michael Molyns of Mackney and Clapcot, Berkshire
- 1576: Robert D'Oyly of Merton and John Coop
- 1577: William Hawtrey
- 1578: Richard Corbet
- 1579: Edmund Bray
- 1580: Richard Huddleston of Thame Park
- 1581: Thomas Denton
- 1582: Sir Anthony Cope, 1st Baronet of Hanwell
- 1583: Richard Fiennes of Broughton Castle
- 1584: Owen Oglethorpe of Newington
- 1585–1586: John D'Oyly of Merton and Chislehampton
- 1587: Michael Blount of Mapledurham
- 1588: John Danvers
- 1589: William Clarke
- 1590: William Spencer of Yarnton
- 1591: Sir Anthony Cope, 1st Baronet of Hanwell
- 1592: Robert Chamblayn
- 1593: Francis Stonard of Blount's Court, Stonor Park
- 1594: Ralph Fiennes
- 1595: Owen Oglethorpe of Newington
- 1596: William Frere of Water Eaton
- 1597: George Broome
- 1598: Michael Blount of Mappledurham
- 1599: Francis Curson

=== 17th century ===
- 1600: William Greene
- 1601: William Pope
- 1602: Richard Farmer
- 1603: Sir Anthony Cope, 1st Baronet
- 1604: Sir George Tipping
- 1605: James Harington of Merton
- 1606: Sir Thomas Temple
- 1607: Roland Lacy
- 1608: Henry Sambourne
- 1609: Michael Dormer
- 1610: Benedict Winchcombe
- 1611: Thomas Moyle
- 1612: William Clerke
- 1613: Henry Lee
- 1614: Edward Dunch
- 1615: Thomas Read
- 1616: Sir Thomas Spencer, 1st Baronet of Yarnton
- 1617: John Curson
- 1618: Edward Fenner
- 1619: Sir William Cope of Hardwick, near Banbury
- 1620: Sir Richard Baker of Middle Aston
- 1621: Francis Stonor
- 1622: Rowland Lacy
- 1623: William Aishcombe
- 1624: Walter Dunch
- 1625: Richard Blount of Mapledurham
- 1626: Richard Lovelace, 1st Baron Lovelace of Hurley, Berkshire and Cope Doyley
- 1627: Richard Wenman, 1st Viscount Wenman of Thame Park
- 1628: Robert Dormer
- 1629: William Cobb
- 1630: John Lacy
- 1631: John Harbourne
- 1632: Thomas Coghill
- 1633: Sir John Meller of Little Bredy, Dorset and Aldermanbury, London
- 1634: Peter Wentworth
- 1635: Sir Francis Norris
- 1636: William Walter of Sarsden
- 1637: Sir Thomas Penyston, 1st Baronet of Cornwell
- 1638: John Doyley of Chislehampton
- 1639: Ralph Warcoppe of Henley
- 1640: Richard Libbe
- 1641: Thomas Tipping
- 1642: Sir Thomas Chamberlayne, 1st Baronet (died in office and replaced by Sir Robert Jenkinson)
- 1643: Sir Robert Jenkinson of Walcot (Charlbury)
- 1644: Sir William Walter, Bt, of Sarsden
- 1645: Edward Clerke (Parliamentary)
- 1645: David Walter (Royalist)
- 1646: William Cope of Hanwell Castle
- 1647: George Chamberlain of Bishops Land, Wardington replaced by Nicholas Herman.
- 1648: Nicholas Herman
- 1649: Robert Jenkinson of Walcot (son of Sir Robert Jenkinson, HS 1643)
- 1650: William Boswell
- 1651: Robert Loggins of Idbury
- 1652: John Kent of Stoke Talmage
- 1653: Charnwell Pettie
- 1654: John Cartwright of Aynhoe Park
- 1655: William Draper of Nether Worton
- 1656: Francis Martin of Ewelme
- 1656: Sir William Walter, 1st Baronet
- 1657: William Draper of Nether Worton
- 1658: Unton Croke of Marston
- 1659: William Gore of Southleigh
- 1660: Robert Vesey of Chimney
- 1661: Thomas Cobb of Adderbury
- 1662: John Taverner of Soundess, (Nettlebed)
- 1663: Sir George Croke of Waterstock, FRS
- 1664
- 12 November 1665: Thomas Wheate, of Glympton Park
- 7 November 1666: William Dormer, of Ascot
- 6 November 1667: Edmund Dunch
- 6 November 1668: Sir William Glynne, of Ambrosden, Bicester
- 11 November 1669: Sir Samuel Jones
- 4 November 1670: John Cartwright, of Aynhoe Park
- 9 November 1671: Henry Hall, of Harding
- 11 November 1672: John Lenthall, of Burford Priory
- 12 November 1673: William Draper, of Nether Worton (accounts rendered for the year by Humphrey Wickham)
- 5 November 1674: William Wright
- 1674 Sir Thomas Curson, 1st Baronet of Water Perry
- 15 November 1675: Sir Edmund Fettiplace, 2nd Baronet
- 10 November 1676: John Gower
- 15 November 1677: John Parsons, of Nether Worton
- 14 November 1678: Ralph Holt, jnr of Stoke Lyne
- 13 November 1679: Sir James Perrott, jnr
- 4 November 1680: Edmund Gregory, of Cuxham
- 1681: Robert Mayot of Fawler
- 1682: John Wickham of Garsington
- 1683: Robert Dashwood of Northbrook, Kirtlington
- 1684: Sir John D'Oyley of Chiselhampton
- 1685: Sir Edward Reade, Bt of Shipton Court
- 1686: Sir Rowland Lacy of Pudlicot
- 1687: Sir Henry Browne of Kiddington, Kt
- 1688: Sir William Glynne of Bicester, Bt replaced by Sir William Walter, 2nd Bt
- 1689: William Blake of Coggs
- 1690: Simon Whorwood A'Dean of Chalgrave
- 1691: Thomas Rowney, Jr. of Oxford
- 1692: Thomas Crispe of Dornford
- 1693: Sir Sebastian Smythe of Cuddesdon
- 1694: James Jennings of Shiplake
- 1695: William Newell of Adwell
- 1696: Sir Thomas Wheate, 1st Baronet of Glympton Park
- 1697: Robert Barber of Adderbury
- 1698: William Hinde
- 1699: Borlase Warren replaced by Thomas Cartwright of Aynhoe Park

=== 18th century ===
- 1700: Sir James Reade, Bt of Shipton Court
- 1701: Sir John Thornycroft, 1st Baronet of Milcombe
- 1702: Francis Keck of Great Tew
- 1703: Thomas Whorwood
- 1704: Humphrey Smith of Kidlington
- 1705: Carlton Stone of Brightwell
- 1706: Sir William Glynne of Bicester
- 1707: Borlase Warren of Stratton Audley
- 1708: Goddard Carter
- 1709: John Lenthall (1 December) then William Lenthall (18 December)
- 1710: Sir William Osbaldeston of Chadlington, Bt
- 1711: Charles Holt of Stoke Lyne
- 1712: Richard Lybbe of Hardwick
- 1713: Sir Charles Fettiplace, Bt of Swinbrook (died in office and replaced by Sir Lorenzo Fettiplace, Bt)
- 1714: James Norreys of Weston on the Green
- 1715: Charles Crisp of Dornford
- 1716: William Tipping of Draycot
- 1717: John Travell of Swerford
- 1718: Thomas Whorwood
- 1719: Francis Nourse of Woodeaton
- 1720: Daniel Blake of Coggs
- 1721: John Dew of Bampton
- 1722: Benjamin Sweet
- 1723: John Blewitt of Salford
- 1724: Allan Horde of Cote
- 1725: James Croke of Studley
- 1726: John Saunders
- 1727: Richard Wickham of Garsington
- 1728: Edward Barber of Adderbury
- 1730: Thomas Greenwood of Chastleton
- 1731: Henry Smith of Caversham
- 1732: Sir Edward Turner, 1st Baronet of Ambrosden
- 1733: Francis Heywood the younger of Forest Hill
- 1734: Sebastian Smythe of Cuddesdon
- 1735: Sir Edward Cobb, Bt of Adderbury
- 1736: Samuel Greenhill of Swyncombe
- 1737: John Clerke of North Weston
- 1738: Sir James Dashwood, 2nd Baronet of Kirtlington Park
- 1739: Philip Powys of Hardwick
- 1740: John Duncombe of Watlington
- 1741: John Nourse of Woodeaton
- 1742: Joseph Taylor of Sandford
- 1743: Rowland Lacy of Pudlicot
- 1744: Thomas Whorwood of Holton
- 1745: John Raine of Badgmore
- 1746: Thomas Horde of Coate
- 1747: Edward Metcalf of Drayton
- 1748: John Pollard of Finmore
- 1749: John Coker of Bicester
- 1750: Francis Gierke of North Weston
- 1751: No sheriff appointed (change of calendar)
- 1752: Francis Page of Middle Aston and Acton Hall, Worcs.
- 1753: Thomas Horde, of Coate
- 1754: Thomas Blackall, of Hazeley
- 1755: Sir William Burnaby, 1st Baronet of Broughton
- 1756: Charles Peers of Chiselhampton
- 1757: Sir Francis Knollys, 1st Baronet of Thame
- 1758: Robert Fettyplace of Pudlicott
- 1759: Anthony Hodges of Harpsden
- 1760: Samuel Trotman of Bucknell
- 1761: Charles Price of Rotherfield
- 1762: William Vanderstegen of Cane End
- 1763: Edward Horn of Pyrton
- 1764: Abel Dottin of Newnham Murren
- 1765: Arthur Annesley of Bletchingdon
- 1766: Thomas Rollinson of Chadlington
- 1767: William Ledwell of Cowley
- 1768: Stukeley Bayntun of Chadlington
- 1769: Fiennes Trotman of Shelswell Park
- 1770: Francis Wastie of Cowley
- 1771: William Draper of Nether Worton
- 1772: Thomas Willats of Caversham
- 1773: John Bush of Burcot
- 1774: William Nedham of Howbery Park
- 1775: Henry Barber of Adderbury
- 1776: Oldfield Bowles of North Aston
- 1777: John Weyland of Woodeaton
- 1778: Charles Burrell Massingberd of Braisiers
- 1779: Edward Witts of Swerford Park
- 1780: Robert Langford of Ensham
- 1781: Richard Paul Joddrell of Lewknor
- 1782: William Phillips of Culham
- 1783: Sir Gregory Page-Turner, 3rd Baronet of Ambrosden
- 1784: Arthur Annesley of Bletchington Park
- 1785: John Lenthall the Younger, of Burford Priory
- 1786: Joseph Grote of Badgemore
- 1787: Charles Marsack of Caversham Park
- 1788: Thomas Jemmet of Little Milton
- 1789: John Blackall, jnr, of Haseley
- 1790: David Fell of Cavesham
- 1791: James Peter Auriol of Woodcot
- 1792: Thomas Willats of Caversham
- 1793: John Caillaud of Aston Rowant
- 1794: Samuel Gardiner of Coombe Lodge, Whitchurch
- 1795: Strickland Freeman of Fawley Court
- 1796: William Lowndes Stone of Brightwell
- 1797: James Jones of Adwell
- 1798: John Atkyns-Wright of Oxford
- 1799: George Stratton of Great Tew

=== 19th century ===
- 5 February 1800: Richard Williams, of Nathrop
- 11 February 1801: George Clarke, of Chesterton
- 3 February 1802: Thomas Toovey, of Nettlebed
- 3 February 1803: James Taylor, of Sandford
- 1 February 1804: John Langston, of Sarsden House
- 6 February 1805: Elisha Biscoe, of Holton Park
- 1 February 1806: George Frederick Stratton, of Great Tew Park
- 4 February 1807: William Hodges, of Bolney Court
- 3 February 1808: Thomas Parker, of Eynsham Hall
- 6 February 1809: John Harrison, of Shelswell
- 31 January 1810: William Henry Ashhurst, of Waterstock
- 8 February 1811: Sir John Chandos Reade, 7th Baronet, of Shipstone
- 24 January 1812: Francis Sackville Lloyd Wheate, of Glympton Park
- 10 February 1813: William Wilson, of Nether Worton
- 4 February 1814: James King, of Neithrop
- 13 February 1815: Edward Francis Coulston, of Filkins
- 1816: John Phillips of Culham
- 1817: James Carey Willington of Coggs initially selected but died and replaced by Joseph Henley of Water Perry
- 1818: Philip Lybbe Powys (grandson of Philip, HS 1740)
- 1819: James Langston of Sarsden House
- 1820: Thomas Fraser of Woodcot House
- 1821: Charles Peers, of Chiselhampton
- 1822: John Blackall, of Great Haseley
- 1823: Daniel Stuart of Wykham Park
- 1824: Stanlake Batson of Mixbury
- 1825: Sir Francis Desanges, Kt of Aston Rowant
- 1826: William Peere Williams-Freeman of Henley-upon-Thames
- 1827: Joseph Wilson of Nether Worton
- 1828: Charles Cottrell Dormer of Rousham
- 1829: Thomas Cobb of Calthorpe House
- 1830: Richard Weyland, of Woodeaton
- 1831: Sir Henry Lambert, 5th Baronet, of Aston
- 1832: Michael Henry Blount of Mapledurham
- 1833: Sir George Dashwood, 4th Baronet, of Kirtlington Park
- 1834: William Francis Lowndes-Stone, of Brightwell House
- 1835: John Fane, of Wormsley
- 1836: Thomas Stonor, of Stonor
- 1837: Philip Thomas Herbert Wykeham, of Tythrop House
- 1838: William Peere Williams-Freeman, of Fawley Court
- 1839: John Harrison Slater Harrison, of Shelswell
- 1840: Hugh Hamersley, of Great Haseley House
- 1841: John Loveday, of Williamscote
- 1842: John Shawe Phillips, of Culham House
- 1843: William Henry Vanderstegen, of Cane End House
- 1844: Walter Strickland, of Cokethorpe Park
- 1845: John Sidney North, of Wroxton Abbey
- 1846: Mortimer Ricardo, of Kiddington
- 1847: Henry Baskerville, of Crowsley Park, Henley-on-Thames
- 1848: Matthew Piers Watt Boulton, of Great Tew
- 1849: Samuel Weare Gardiner, of Coombe Lodge, Whitchurch
- 1850: Henry Hall, of Barton
- 1851: John Brown, of Kingston Blount
- 1852: John Henry Ashhurst, of Waterstock
- 1853: James Morrell Jr., of Oxford
- 1854: John William Fane, of Wormsley
- 1855: Benjamin John Whippy, of Lee Place, Charlbury
- 1856: William Evetts, of Tackley Park
- 1857: Charles Dillon, 14th Viscount Dillon, of Dytchley
- 1858: Henry Lomax Gaskell, of Kiddington Hall
- 1859: George Gammie, of Shotover House
- 1860: John Fowden Hodges, of Bolney Court
- 1861: Henry Birch Reynardson, of Adwell
- 1862: Edward Mackenzie, of Fawley Court
- 1863: Thomas Taylor, of Aston House
- 1864: George Glen, of Stratton Audley Park
- 1865: William Melliar Foster-Melliar, of North Aston
- 1866: Sir Henry William Dashwood, of Kirtlington Park, Baronet
- 1867: Alexander William Hall of Duns Tew
- 1868: William Earle Biscoe, of Holton Park
- 1869: James Mason of Eynsham Hall
- 1870: John Weyland of Woodeaton
- 1871: Sir Algernon William Peyton, 4th Bt. of Swifts House, Stoke Lyne near Bicester
- 1872: Charles Sartoris of Wilcote House
- 1873: William Dalziel Mackenzie, of Gillotts
- 1874: Arthur, Viscount Valentia, of Bletchingdon Park
- 1875: Edward William Vernon Harcourt, of Nuneham Park
- 1876: Holford Cotton Risley, of Deddington
- 1877: Arthur Henry Clerke Brown, of Kingston Blount
- 1878: Albert Brassey, of Heythrop Park
- 1879: William Fanning, of Bozedown, Whitchurch
- 1880: Lieutenant–Colonel James Miller, of Shotover House
- 1881: Major–General Sir Thomas Peyton, of Swift's House, 5th Baronet
- 1882: Edward Slater Harrison, of Shelswell Park
- 1883: William Henry Fox, of Bradwell Grove
- 1884: Wenman Aubrey Wykeham-Musgrove, of Thame Park
- 1885: George Herbert Morrell, of Headington Hill Hall
- 1886: Sir Francis George Stapleton, of Grey's Court, 8th Baronet
- 1887: Philip James Digby Wykeham, of Tythrop House
- 1888: John Darell Blount, of Mapledurham House
- 1889: William Mewburn, of Wykham Park
- 1890: John Foster, of Combe Park
- 1891: William Henry Ashhurst, of Waterstock
- 1892: Cecil D'Aguilar Samuda, of Shipton Court
- 1893: Charles Twysden Hoare, of Bignell, Bicester
- 1894: Alexander Casper Fraser, of Mongewell
- 1895: Richard Ovey, of Badgemore, Henley-on-Thames
- 1896: Sir Algernon Francis Peyton, of Swift's House, Bicester, 6th Baronet
- 1897: Aubrey Harcourt, of Nuneham Park
- 1898: Lieutenant–Colonel George Gosling, of Stratton Audley Park
- 1899:John Frederick Starkey, of Borticote House,

=== 20th century ===
- 1900: Robert Hichens Camden Harrison, of Shiplake Court
- 1901: Henry Clerke Brown, of Kingston Blount
- 1902: Captain Charles Walter Cottrell-Dormer, of Rousham Park
- 1903: Sir George John Egerton Dashwood, Bt., of Kirtlington Park
- 1904: James Walker Larnach, of Adderbury House
- 1905: Leonard Noble, of Harpsden Court
- 1906: George Talfourd Inman, of Highmoor Hall
- 1907: Leigh Hoskyns, of Cotefield
- 1908: Vernon James Watney, of Cornbury Park
- 1909: Robert Fleming, of Joyce Grove, Nettlebed
- 1910: William Frederick Pepper, of Shipton Court
- 1911: Sir Paul Augustine Makins, Bt. of Chilterns End, Henley-on-Thames
- 1912: Edward Ferguson Chance, of Sandford Park
- 1913: William John Birch Reynardson, of Adwell House, Tetsworth
- 1914: John Norman Hardcastle, of Broughton Hall
- 1915: John Wormald, of Springs, North Stoke
- 1916: Colonel James Hoole, of The Manor House, Headington, Oxford
- 1917: Arthur Henry Renshaw, of Watlington Park
- 1918: Frederick Gelderd-Somervell, of Haseley Manor
- 1919: George Merrick Fowler, of Horspath Manor, Oxford
- 1920: Edmund Charles Sawyer of Little Milton Manor. Died in office and replaced in October 1920 by Brigadier-General Alfred Douglas Miller of Shotover House, Wheatley
- 1921: Ernest Samuelson, of Bodicote Grange, Banbury
- 1922: Stephen Montagu Burrows, of Norham Gardens, Oxford
- 1923: Francis Durrant Hunt, of The Lodge, Stanton Harcourt
- 1924: George Boscawen Randolph, of Steeple Aston
- 1925: Charles Vincent Sale, of Aston Rowant House
- 1926: John Graeme Thomson, of Shipton Court, Shipton-under-Wychwood
- 1927: Lieut.-Col. Richard Lockhart Ovey, of Hernes, Henley-on-Thames
- 1928: Capt. Sir Algernon Thomas Peyton, 7th Bt., of Swifts House, Stoke Lyne, near Bicester
- 1929: Lieut.-Col. Cecil Francis Heyworth-Savage, of Bradwell Grove, Burford, Oxford
- 1930: James Herbert Morrell, of Headington Hill, Oxford
- 1931: Major Arthur Henry Dillon, of Barton Lodge, Steeple Aston, Oxford
- 1932: Lieut.-Col. Sir Francis Kennedy McClean, of Huntercombe Place, Henley-on-Thames
- 1933: Major George Edward Gosling, of Stratton Audley Park, Bicester
- 1934: Lieut.-Col. Mervyn Edward George Rhys Wingfield, of Barrington Park, Burford
- 1935: Capt. Bertram Thomas Carlyle Ogilvy Freeman-Mitford, (later 3rd Baron Redesdale) of Westwell, Burford
- 1936: Major George Cecil Whitaker, of Britwell House, Watlington replaced by Lieut-Col. Arthur Montagu Colvile of Weald Manor, Bampton
- 1937: Oliver Vernon Watney, of Cornbury Park, Charlbury
- 1938: Major Percy Henry Guy Feilden, of Cokethorpe, Witney
- 1939: Lieut.-Col Henry Everard Du Cane Norris, of Cross Hill, Adderbury, Banbury
- 1940: Frederick Edward Withington, of Fringford Lodge, Bicester
- 1941: Major George Cecil Whitaker, of Britwell House, Watlington, Oxford
- 1942: Bertram Edward Dunbar Kilburn, of Ledwell House, Sandford St. Martin, Oxford
- 1943: Sir Sothern Holland, of Westwell Manor, Burford, Oxfordshire
- 1944: Henry Mark Beaufoy, of Hill House, Steeple Aston
- 1945: Randal Smith, 2nd Baron Bicester, of Tusmore Park, Bicester
- 1946: Ellis Haldane Chinnery, of Fringford House, Bicester
- 1947: Captain Thomas Miller, of Icknield House, Goring-on-Thames
- 1948: Sir William Goodenough, 1st Baronet, of Filkins Hall, Lechlade, Gloucs.
- 1949: Captain Duncan Mackinnon, of Swinbrook House, Burford
- 1950: Brevet-Colonel Morys Lancelot Lloyd-Mostyn, of Old Rectory, Hethe, Bicester
- 1951: Michael Henry Mason, of Scott's House, Eynsham Park, Witney
- 1952: Lieut-Colonel Robert Peter Fleming,, of Merrimoles House, Nettlebed, Henley-on-Thames
- 1953: Doctor Arthur Quinton Wells, of Shipton Manor, Kidlington, Oxford
- 1954: Major Harold George Morrell, of King's End House, Bicester
- 1955: Major Alexander Alfred Miller, of Shotover House, Wheatley
- 1956: Colonel Hugh John Cochrane Ducat-Hamersley, of Pyrton Manor, Watlington
- 1957: Brevet Colonel John Thomson, of Woodperry, Stanton St. John, Oxford
- 1958: Lieut-Colonel Henry Thomas Birch Reynardson, of Adwell House, Tetsworth,
- 1959: Lieut-Colonel Aubrey Vere Spencer, of Wheatfield- Park, Tetsworth
- 1960: Colonel Herbert William James Morrell, of Carphill, Sandford St. Martin
- 1961: Hugh David Hamilton Wills, of Sandford Park, Sandford St. Martin, Oxford
- 1962: John Heyworth, of Bradwell Grove, Burford
- 1963: Lieut.-Colonel Anthony Donnithorne Taylor, of North Aston Manor, Oxford
- 1964: John Barkley Schuster, of Manor Farm, Nether Worton, Middle Barton
- 1965: Richard Alan Budgett, of Portway House, Kirtlington
- 1966: Lieut.-Colonel John Edward Stanes Chamberlayne, of The Elm, Chipping Norton
- 1967: Captain Charles Raymond Radclyffe, of Lew, Oxford
- 1968: Major Robert Arnold Paul Butler, of Lower Farm, Ramsden, Oxford
- 1969: Major Benjamin George Barnett, of Swifts House, near Bicester
- 1970: Henry Miles Gosling, of Stratton Audley Park, Bicester
- 1971: Major-General Sir Randle Guy Feilden, of Old Manor House, Minster Lovell
- 1972: Major John Francis Ballard, of Over Worton House, Middle Barton
- 1973: Major Peter Henry Parker, of The Hays, Ramsden
- 1974: William Robert Ashley Birch Reynardson, of Adwell House, Tetsworth
- 1975: John Ernest Harley Collins, of Tusmore Park, Bicester
- 1976: Major Alastair Giles Mann, of Wheatfield House, Tetsworth, Oxford
- 1977: John Coppleston Luther Fane, of Wormsley Park, Watlington
- 1978: William Archibald Ottley Juxon Bell, of Cottisford House, near Bicester
- 1979: Charles Evelyn Cecil, of Wilcote House, Charlbury
- 1980: Robin Fleming, of Church Farm, Steeple Barton
- 1981: Colonel Thomas Armitage Hall, of Chiselhampton House, Stadhampton
- 1982: Ian Weston Smith, of The Old Rectory, Hinton Waldrist, Faringdon
- 1983: Sir Mark Annesley Norman, of Wilcote Manor, Charlbury
- 1984: Isabella Juliet Hutchinson, of Sarsden Glebe, Churchill.
- 1985: Alan Tyser, of West Hanney House, Wantage
- 1986: Charles John Swallow, of Manor Barn House, Wendlebury, Bicester
- 1987: Frederick Roger Goodenough, of Broadwell Manor, Lechlade, Gloucs.
- 1988: Hugo Laurence Joseph Brunner, of 26 Norham Road, Oxford
- 1989: Charles George Archibald Parker, of The White House, Nuffield
- 1990: Crispin Gascoigne, of The Manor House, Stanton Harcourt, Oxford
- 1991: Julian Blackwell, of Osse Field, Appleton, near Abingdon.
- 1992: John Joseph Eyston, of Mapledurham House, near Reading, Berkshire
- 1993: Sir David Black
- 1994: David Peter Mason, of Scott's House, Eynsham Park, Witney
- 1995: John Stuart Bridgeman, of Eastgate House, Hornton, Banbury
- 1996: Malcolm Ralph Cochrane, of Grove Farmhouse, Shipton-under-Wychwood, Chipping Norton
- 1997: Wendy, Lady French, The Old Vicarage, Ipsden
- 1998: Richard Ovey, Hernes, Rotherfield Greys
- 1999: Andrew James Feilden, The Old Manor House, Minster Lovell, near Witney

=== 21st century ===
- 2000: Richard Hubert Lethbridge, Fulbrook, Burford
- 2001: Lady Sylvia McLintock, Fulbrook, Burford
- 2002: Brigadier John Nigel Ballard Mogg, Brightwell Baldwin
- 2003: Anthony Flinders Spink, Woolstone, Uffington
- 2004: Anne Kelaart, Nettlebed
- 2005: Ian Michael Laing
- 2006: Peter Christopher Bickmore
- 2007: Thomas Christopher Loyd
- 2008: Brigadier Ian Peter Inshaw
- 2009: Charles Richard Dick of Appleton, Abingdon
- 2010: Marie-Jane Barnett of Towersay, Thame
- 2011: Penelope Glen of Forest Hill
- 2012: William Alden of Iffley
- 2013: Graham Upton of Headington
- 2014: Anthony John Stratton, Headington, Oxford
- 2015: Thomas Henry Birch Reynardson of Adwell, Thame
- 2016: Sarah Jane Taylor, Thame
- 2017: Jane Elizabeth Cranston of Abingdon
- 2018: Richard Venables of Islip
- 2019: Lady Sylvia Jay of Ewelme, Wallingford
- 2020: Amanda Ponsonby of Churchill, near Chipping Norton
- 2021: Imam Monawar Hussain, of Cowley
- 2022: Mark George Beard, of Buckland
- 2023: Sally Patricia Scott, of Shenington, Banbury
- 2024: James Justin Macnamara, of Lower Heyford
- 2025: John Clive Cecil May, of Bicester
- 2026: Muhammad Jawaid Malik, of Oxford
