= John Thornycroft =

John Thornycroft may refer to:

- Sir John Thornycroft, 1st Baronet (1659–1725), English barrister-at-law
- John Edward Thornycroft (1872–1960), British civil engineer
- John Isaac Thornycroft (1843–1928), British shipbuilder
- John I. Thornycroft & Company Limited, the shipbuilding company named after him
