= Bloxham Village Museum =

Local museum in Bloxham, England

Coordinates: 52.0176°N 1.3751°W

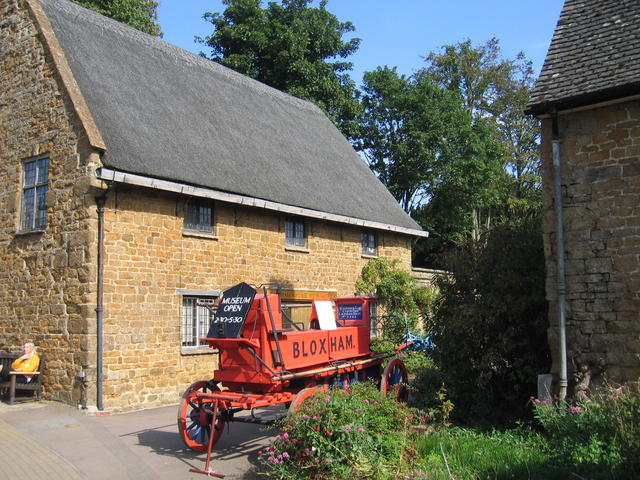
View of the museum

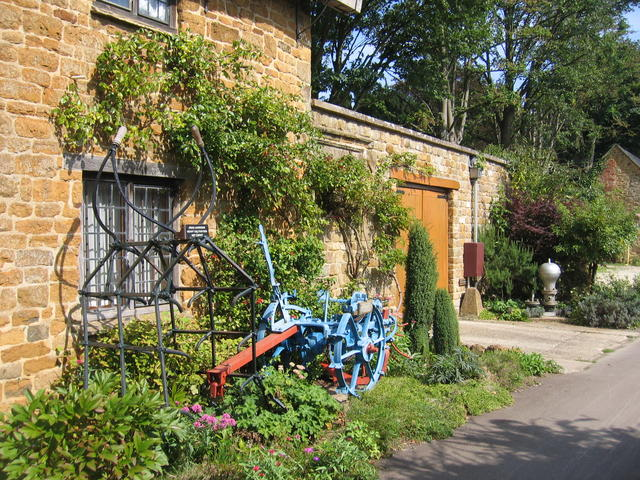
Another external view

Bloxham Village Museum is a local museum located in the village of Bloxham in Oxfordshire, England.

It was established in 1980 and is in the old court house and fire station in a corner of St Mary's churchyard. The building was rebuilt in the 1680s and retains some 14th-century details.

== See also ==
- List of museums in Oxfordshire
- Museum of Oxford

== Bibliography ==
- Sherwood, Jennifer; Pevsner, Nikolaus (1974). Oxfordshire. The Buildings of England. Harmondsworth: Penguin Books. ISBN 0-14-071045-0.
