= Sir John Thornycroft, 1st Baronet =

Sir John Thornycroft, 1st Baronet (16 November 1659 - 8 December 1725) was an English barrister-at-law.

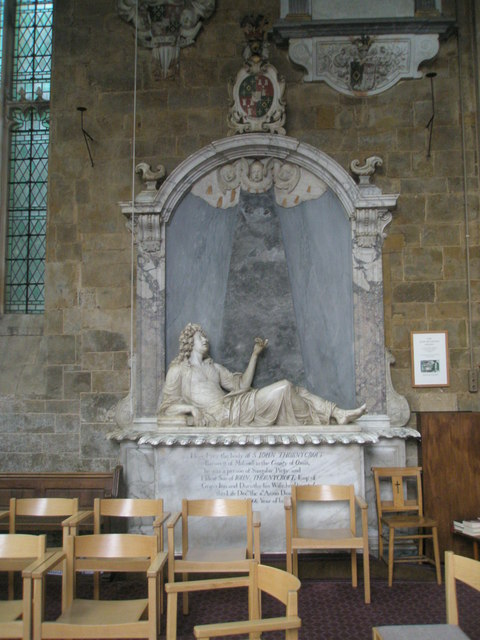

Thornycroft was born in London, the son of Sir John Thornycroft and Dorothy, daughter of Sir John Howel. He was educated at St John's College, Cambridge and Gray's Inn and practised as a barrister in Oxford. He served as High Sheriff of Oxfordshire in 1701. He was created a baronet, of Milcombe, Oxfordshire in the Baronetage of England, on 12 August 1701. Soon after he had been made a baronet he presented a petition to the Lords of the Treasury, asking to be excused from paying the Crown the £1,095 sum expected in return for his honour. He was excused payment.

He married Elizabeth Key, the daughter of Josiah Key. His wife's family owned the estate at Milcombe. Together they had five children, two of whom died young. Thornycroft was succeeded by his son, John, and is buried in the Milcombe Chapel at St Mary's Church, Bloxham.

Political offices
Preceded by Sir Thomas Wheate	High Sheriff of Oxfordshire; 1697	Succeeded by Thomas Cartwright
Baronetage of England
New creation	Baronet (of Milcombe); 1701–1725	Succeeded by John Thornycroft
