= Charles Ernest Peers =

South African artist (1875–1944)

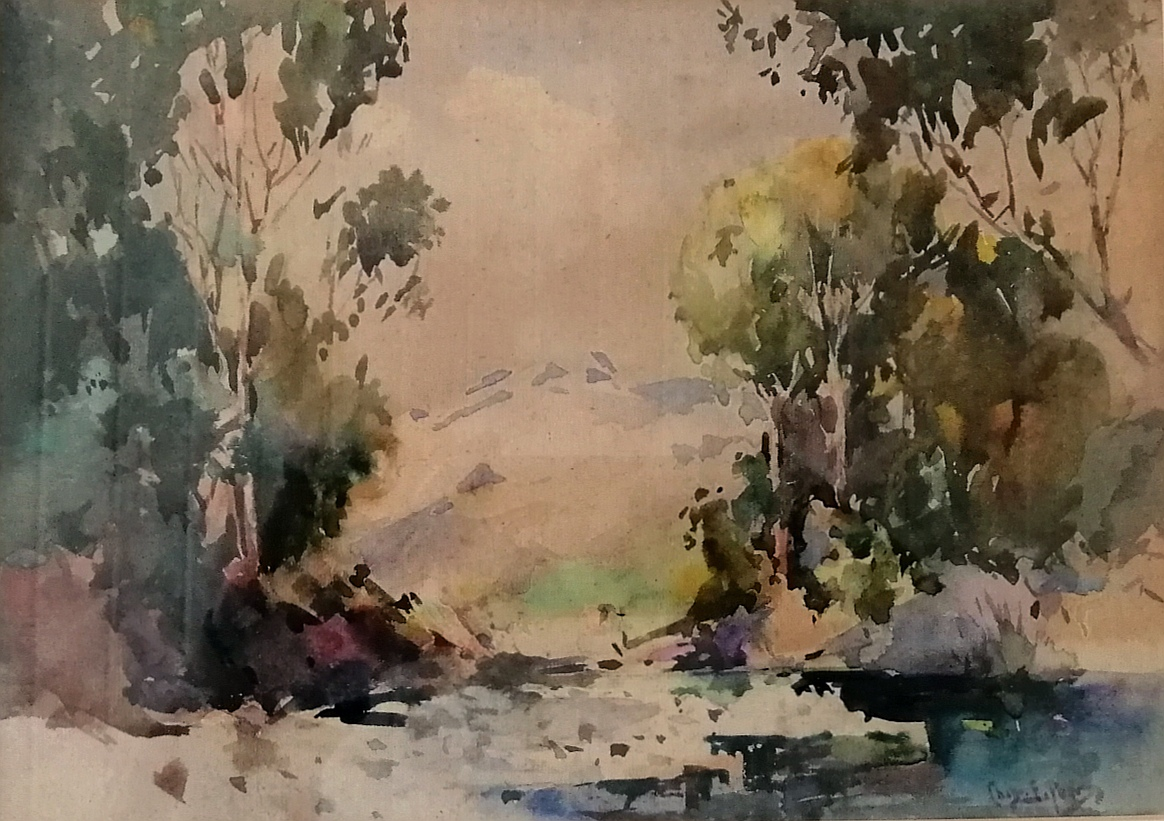
Charles E Peers Landscape

Charles Ernest Peers (1875, Belfast, Ireland – 1944, Higgovale, Cape Town, South Africa) was a South African artist.

Peers spent his youth in Liverpool, England, where he recorded the shipping activity on the Mersey. He wished to become a naval architect, but could not afford to study professionally. He spent a brief period at the Liverpool School of Art before settling in the Cape Colony in 1904.

Peers was elected a member of the South African Society of Artists in 1905, and became chairman of the South African Fine Arts Association. He won the Cape Times poster competition in 1924, and became a member of the South African Institute of Art in 1926. He was also president of the Owl Club in 1934, president of the K Club in 1935, was invited by the New Group to participate in their first exhibition in 1938, and subsequently was elected President of the group, an office he held until his death.

Peers made a living as a chromo-lithographer with various printing companies, including Galvin & Sales in Cape Town. He illustrated The Seven Wonders of South Africa by Hedley Chilvers and The Coast of Hermanus by Will Costello. He also produced a series of auto-lithographic cigarette cards for the United Tobacco Company album Our Land / Ons Land (1939), and several illustrated calendars during the 1930s for the Vacuum Oil Company.

Peers worked mainly in watercolor, but also produced oils and pastels as well as pencil drawings, etchings, linocuts, and lithographs. He concentrated on landscapes, architecture, and maritime subjects.

== Exhibitions ==
Solo exhibition, Lezard′s Gallery, Johannesburg, 1923
Joint exhibition with Allerley Glossop, Taylor Art Gallery, Pietermaritzburg, 1924
Solo exhibition, Dempers and Wiley's Art Gallery, Cape Town, 1924
Various group exhibitions from 1926, including the inaugural exhibition of the South African Institute of Art, Durban, 1927
Joint exhibition with J. Pope Ellis, Cape Town, 1939
Represented in all annual New Group exhibitions from 1938 to 1945
Represented in the exhibition of South African Art at the Tate Gallery London, 1948
Prestige exhibition to commemorate the centenary of his birth, South African National Gallery, 1975
Represented in 'English and South African Watercolours in the South African National Gallery′, Cape Town, 1976
Featured in ′The Michaelis Collection: the Cape in Watercolours′, Cape Town, 1991.
Peter Visser Antiques mounted the first sale exhibition of his works since the 1930s in 1991.

== Public collections ==
Albany Museum, Grahamstown
Cape Town Municipal Collection
Durban Art Gallery
Iziko Museum, Cape Town (South African National Gallery & Slave Lodge)
Museum Afrika, Johannesburg
Old House Museum, Durban
Pretoria Art Museum
Tatham Art Gallery, Pietermaritzburg
University of Cape Town
William Humphreys Art Gallery, Kimberley
