= John Bush (High Sheriff) =

- Born: c. 1745

John Bush (c. 1745 – date of death unknown) was an English landowner and officer of militia who served as Sheriff of Oxfordshire in 1773.

== Early life ==
Born about 1745, a son of Jonathan Bush of Burcot, Bush was educated at John Roysse's Free School in Abingdon, (now Abingdon School). On 14 December 1762 he matriculated at Queen's College, Oxford, aged seventeen. His only graduation recorded in Alumni Oxonienses is as a Doctor of Civil Law on 8 July 1773.

== Career ==
Bush is noted as Sheriff of Oxfordshire in July 1773. He was a Steward of the Club of Old Abingdonians in 1774 and in the Enclosure Award of 1776 was one of the two principal landowners in the parish of Burcot. He held the rank of captain in the Oxfordshire Militia list of 1779.

== Personal life ==
On 10 March 1770, at Albury, Oxfordshire, Bush married Susanna Wingrove of that parish.

Political offices
Preceded by Thomas Willats of Caversham	High Sheriff of Oxfordshire; 1773–1774	Succeeded by William Nedham

== See also ==
- List of Old Abingdonians
