= Thomas Whorwood of Holton =

Thomas Whorwood
- Born: 1718
- Died: 1771

Thomas Whorwood of Holton (1718–1771) was High Sheriff of Oxfordshire.

== Biography ==
Thomas was born in 1718. He was educated at John Roysse's Free School in Abingdon, (now Abingdon School) (1730–1735) and later Wadham College, Oxford.

In 1744, Thomas was appointed High Sheriff of Oxfordshire.

Following the death of his father, Thomas Whorwood senior, in 1736, he was Lord of the Manors of Headington and Holton in Oxfordshire. He married (Ann) Penelope Schutz of Shotover in Westminster in 1746, but they had no children. He died in 1771.

Political offices
Preceded by Rowland Lacy of Pudlicot	High Sheriff of Oxfordshire; 1744-45	Succeeded by John Raine of Badgmore

== See also ==
- List of Old Abingdonians
