= Alard Banastre =

Alard Banastre (fl. 1174), was High Sheriff of Oxfordshire under Henry II in 1174 and 1176.

In this capacity, Banastre was appointed, in company with the constable of Oxford, to fix the tallages and assizes on the king's demesnes in that county. He seems likewise to have been empowered to settle the pleas of the crown and the common pleas of the same shire. In 1175, though Alard Banastre was still sheriff, he does not appear to have acted in the capacity of justice errant. Possibly the king was again dissatisfied with the conduct of his sheriffs in judging their own counties; for, while in 1174 the number of counties judged by their own sheriffs bears a very considerable proportion to the whole, in 1176 the whole kingdom seems to have been practically placed under the power of six justices acting in couples. It was probably as a result of the great rebellion of 1174 that Henry II inaugurated this change; but in any case the name of Alard Banastre does not, apparently, occur again as one of the king's justices. The sheriff of Oxfordshire for the four years preceding 1174 was one Adam Banastre, who, as Foss suggests, may have been the father of Alard Banastre.
