= Thornycroft baronets =

Extinct baronetcy in the Baronetage of England

The Thornycroft Baronetcy, of Milcomb in the County of Oxford, was a title in the Baronetage of England. It was created on 12 August 1701 for the barrister, John Thornycroft. The title became extinct on the death of the second Baronet in 1743.

== Thornycroft baronets, of Milcomb (1701) ==
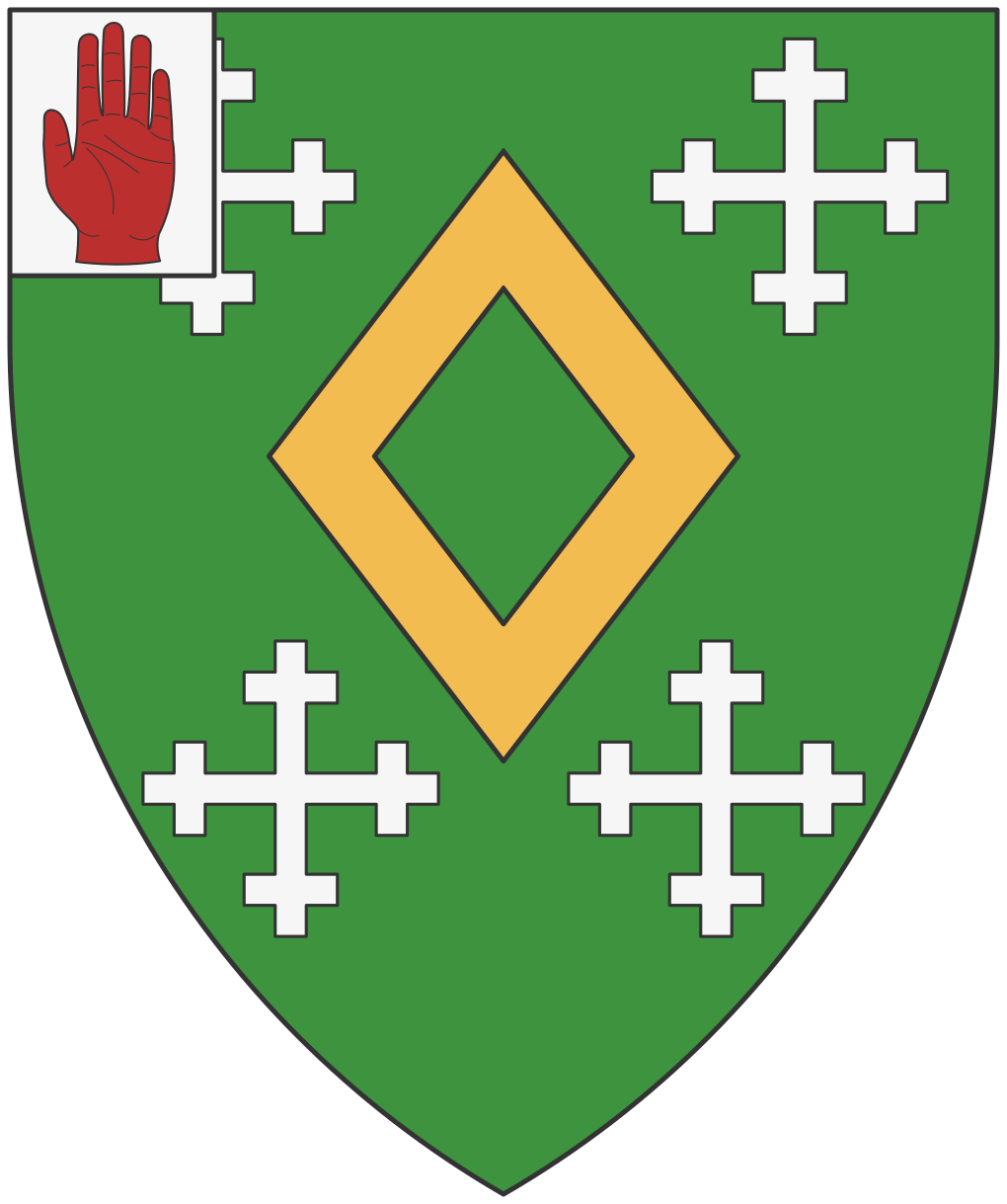
Arms of Thornycroft of Milcomb

- Sir John Thornycroft, 1st Baronet (1659–1725)
- Sir John Thornycroft, 2nd Baronet (1691–1743)
