= Peter Visser =

New Zealand cricketer (born 1960)

Peter John Visser (born 10 May 1960) is a former New Zealand cricketer who played for the Central Districts in the State Championship and in the State Shield in the 1980s. He also played for the Nelson in the Hawke Cup. He was born in Waikari.
