= Bloxham =

Village in Oxfordshire, England

Coordinates: 52.018°N 1.375°W

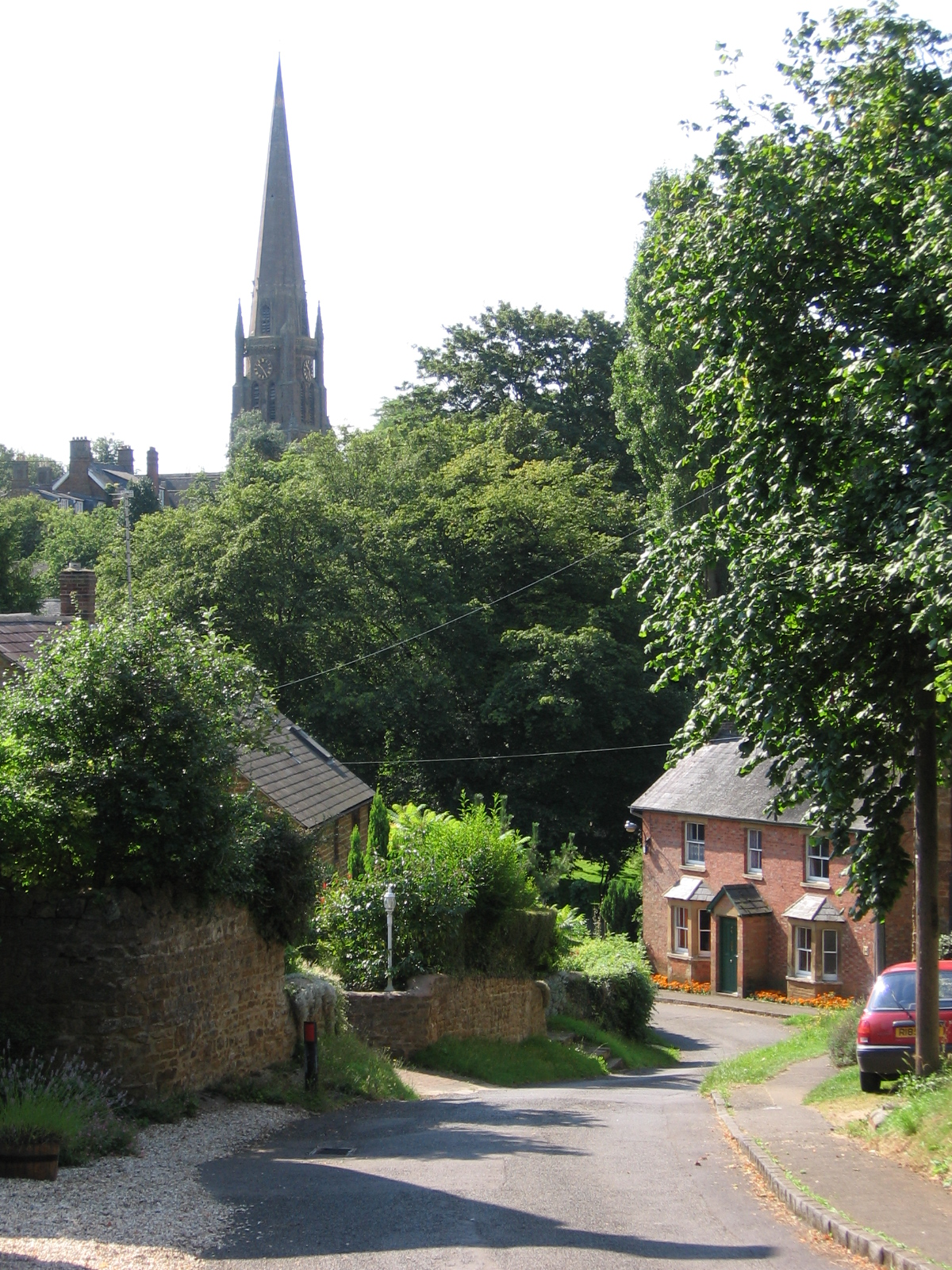
- Part of Bloxham village, with St Mary's church spire in the background

- Location within Oxfordshire
- Area: 12.72 km^{2} (4.91 sq mi)
- Population: 3,374 (2011 Census)
  - Density: 265/km^{2} (690/sq mi)
- OS grid reference: SP4235
- Civil parish: Bloxham
- District: Cherwell
- Shire county: Oxfordshire
- Region: South East
- Country: England
- Sovereign state: United Kingdom
- Post town: Banbury
- Postcode district: OX15
- Dialling code: 01295
- Police: Thames Valley
- Fire: Oxfordshire
- Ambulance: South Central
- UK Parliament: Banbury
- Website: Bloxham Parish Council

Bloxham is a village and civil parish in northern Oxfordshire several miles from the Cotswolds, about 3 miles (5 km) southwest of Banbury. It is on the edge of a valley and overlooked by Hobb Hill. (Note: See Hob (folklore) > Place names > . . .Hobb Hill, Bloxham. . .) The village is on the A361 road. The 2011 Census recorded the parish's population as 3,374.

== History ==
=== Roman ===
Under Roman rule between the 1st and 5th centuries AD there were several farms and a burial site in the Bloxham area. A poor farming community lived at a site 1/2 mile (800 m) west of the present village.

=== Saxon ===
The toponym is derived from the Old English Blocc's Ham (the home of Blocc) from the 6th century, when a Saxon settlement was built on the present site of the village, on the banks of a tributary of the Sor Brook. In 1086 the Domesday Book called the village Blochesham. Its name was subsequently recorded as Blocchesham in 1142, Blokesham in 1216, and finally Bloxham in 1316. In the late Anglo-Saxon era Bloxham was part of a large estate, belonging to the Earl of Mercia, stretching from the boundary with Tadmarton and Wigginton in the west to the River Cherwell. As the caput of a hundred it had been important since at least the time of Edward the Elder.

=== Medieval ===
Around the time of the Norman Conquest of England, a group called the Bloxham Feoffees formed. The name, of Anglo-Norman origin, denotes someone invested with a fief, which was often heritable land or property but could be rights or revenue. Comprising between 8 and 16 local yeomen, the Feoffees were responsible for the well-being of the village community. In return for helping the poor and services such as repairing the bridges, they were bequeathed money and land by the Crown. Until the 20th century they continued their village maintenance despite being replaced by a parish council after the Local Government Act 1894. Today they give financial help to Bloxham residents. The Feoffees own land in Grove Road (which is now rented to the Warriner School), the former allotment field in South Newington Road and the Old Court House.

The Domesday Book of 1086 recorded Blochesham as having six mills and trading in wool and corn. In the Middle Ages it was a large parish with 403 contributors to the poll tax of 1377, of whom 78 lived in neighbouring Milcombe. At this time, the village's north and south parts, separated by the brook, were distinct communities called in Anglo-Norman le Crowehead Ville and le Downe End. The Crown held Bloxham manor by 1067. King Stephen granted it to Waleran de Beaumont, 1st Earl of Worcester, but it returned to being a royal manor in the reign of Henry II.

In 1155 Bloxham was divided in two manors. In 1269 the half later called Bloxham Beauchamp was given to Queen Eleanor, and later bestowed upon Edward III's chamberlain Roger de Beauchamp and sold in 1545 to Richard Fiennes, 6th Baron Saye and Sele. The other half, called Bloxham Fiennes, was passed to Amaury de St Amand, came to be called Saint Amand's, and was subsequently sold to Thomas Wykeham and reunited with Bloxham Beauchamp when Baron Saye and Sele inherited it. Beauchamp Manor stood roughly on the site of Park Close and the Manor of St Amand was on the area now occupied by Godswell House. Although neither manor remains, the dovecote of St Amands is still visible next to Dovecote House. By the 15th century St Mary's Church, Bloxham had become one of the grandest parish churches in southern England, showing Bloxham's medieval wealth.

The medieval street plan survives in the narrow winding alleys where some houses retain a medieval core hidden by later exteriors and alterations. Many of the present street names derive from families living in Bloxham in the early 16th century, e.g. Humber, Job and Budd Lane; although these may remain from Middle Ages they were not documented until 1700. Bloxham has a large number of well-built yeomen's houses dating from this time, including Bennetts, Seal Cottage and the Joiners Arms. Many have been comparatively little altered, retaining their original details and plans.

=== Early modern ===
Bloxham took part in the Buckinghamshire and Oxfordshire Rising of 1549 against the Edwardine Reformation. John Wade, Bloxham's vicar, was identified as a ringleader and threatened with being hanged from his own church tower, but was later pardoned. From the 17th century Nonconformism flourished and was closely linked with the dissenting movement in Banbury. In the English Civil War the Fiennes family of Bloxham was strongly Parliamentarian and the area had a reputation as a Puritan stronghold. There are suggestions that houses in Sycamore Terrace were used as barracks during this time, but this is unsubstantiated. It is believed that Parliamentarian troops caused the damage to the lavishly decorated interior of St Mary's church as they passed through Bloxham.

In the 17th century many houses such as those in Sycamore Terrace were used as weavers' cottages. From the Middle Ages the area around Banbury was known for weaving a fabric called plush. It is made of wool or worsted and linen, the finer types also incorporating silk or mohair. It was used in a wide variety of ways from horse girths to furnishing fabrics.

=== Modern ===
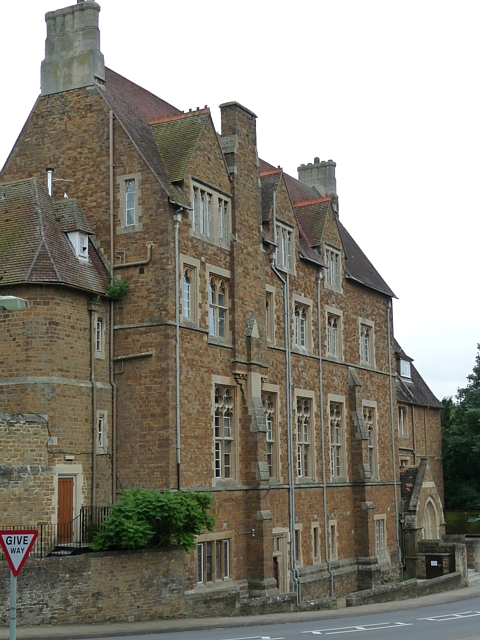
All Saints' School, or Bloxham School, viewed from the High Street.

In 1770 the main road between Banbury and Chipping Norton, which passes through Bloxham, was made into a turnpike. In 1815 the turnpike's trustees straightened the main road to follow its current course. They bought two cottages on the brook and demolished them to make the High Street bridge. The main road ceased to be a turnpike in 1871. In 1922 it was classified as the A361 road. The agricultural depression of the late 18th and early 19th centuries led to a decline in population and some emigration. This period saw a marked increase in poor relief, mainly as a result of successive poor laws including the Speenhamland system, which exacerbated the effects of the Enclosure of land and the decline in the wool market. However the industrial boom in Banbury brought prosperity back to Bloxham.

The 19th century saw the demolition of institutions for the poor such as the Almshouses next to the parish church, the Workhouse, the pest house, which stood near the railway line and the poor-houses on the green. All Saints' School, a Church of England public school now known as Bloxham School, was founded in 1853. It closed for a time, but the Rev PR Edgerton reopened it in 1860. In 1896 All Saints joined the Woodard Corporation. The main school building, designed in the neo-Gothic style by George Edmund Street, dominates the north of the village. The headmaster's house is on top of Hobb Hill, above the Pig Sty playing fields, so called after their use during the Second World War to provide meat for the school. The late 19th century saw an expansion of residential housing to the north of the village in Strawberry Terrace and along the Banbury Road.

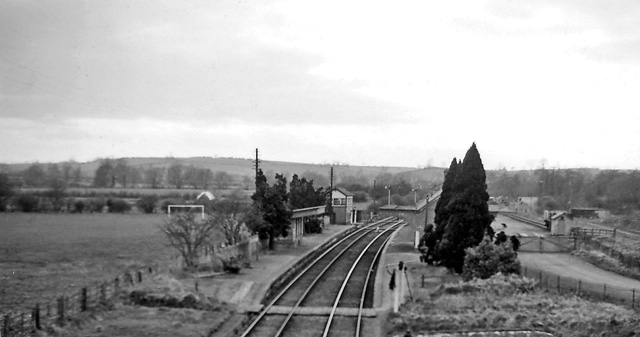
Bloxham Railway Station when it was open

In 1875, the Banbury and Cheltenham Direct Railway opened a railway station on the south side of Bloxham. The B&CDR contracted the Great Western Railway to operate the line and station in return for a share of the receipts. The GWR took over the smaller company in 1897. British Railways closed Bloxham station in 1951 and closed the railway completely in 1964. Houses in Bloxham in Hyde Grove, Orchard Grove and on the south side of Colesbourne Road are on the site of the former Bloxham railway station and trackbed.

In 1919 the Hunt class minesweeper HMS Bloxham was launched for the Royal Navy. As the First World War had ended she was not commissioned for service and the Admiralty sold her in 1923. In 1960 the countryside to the east and north of Bloxham was threatened by a proposal to quarry iron ore from the marlstone. A community campaign opposed the proposal at the Oxfordshire Ironstone Enquiry. The claim that the area was not one of natural beauty was countered by commissioning photographs of the area. The protest succeeded and the proposal was withdrawn.

Production versions of the rare Jaguar XJ220 supercar were produced at Wykham Mill in Bloxham from 1992 until 1994. The Ford Motor Company transferred the factory to Aston Martin for production of the DB7 from 1994 until the factory's closure in 2004. Wykham Mill is now Vantage Business Park, named after the DB7 V12 Vantage which was the last Aston Martin model to be built there.

== Churches ==
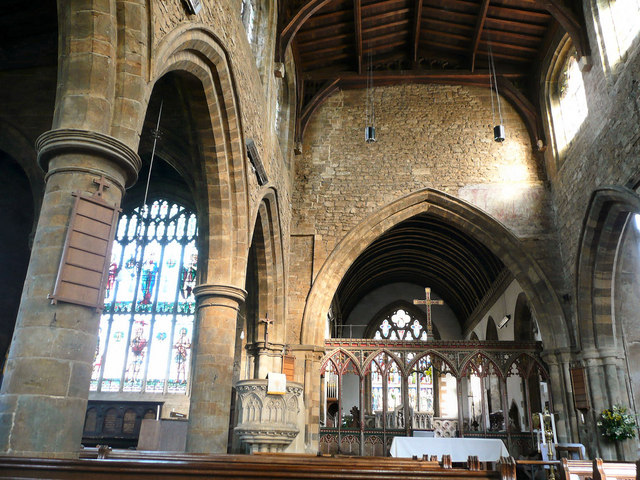
Inside the parish church of Our Lady

=== Church of England ===
The Church of England parish church of St Mary's, Bloxham is one of the grandest in England. Its 14th-century tower and spire is a local landmark and said to be the highest in Oxfordshire, at 198 feet (60 m). Originally under the patronage of the Crown, its advowson was granted to Eton College in 1547 following the Dissolution of the Monasteries. The earliest surviving parts of St Mary's building are 12th century, although most of the present building is from the 14th and 15th centuries. It is notable for its intricate stone carving, dating from the 14th century, and some surviving wall paintings. In the 15th century the Perpendicular Gothic Milcombe chapel was added.

The church was extensively renovated by the Gothic Revival architect G.E. Street between 1864 and 1866. St Mary's benefice is now combined with those of Milcombe and South Newington. The vicar of Bloxham was hanged from the steeple of the church in 1549.

=== Baptist ===
There has been a Baptist congregation in Bloxham since 1682. The current Baptist church was built in 1862 and enlarged in 2001.

=== Chapels ===
A Methodist chapel was built about 1870 but it is now a theatre belonging to Bloxham School. Bloxham School has a large Church of England chapel that is used for school services.

== Amenities ==
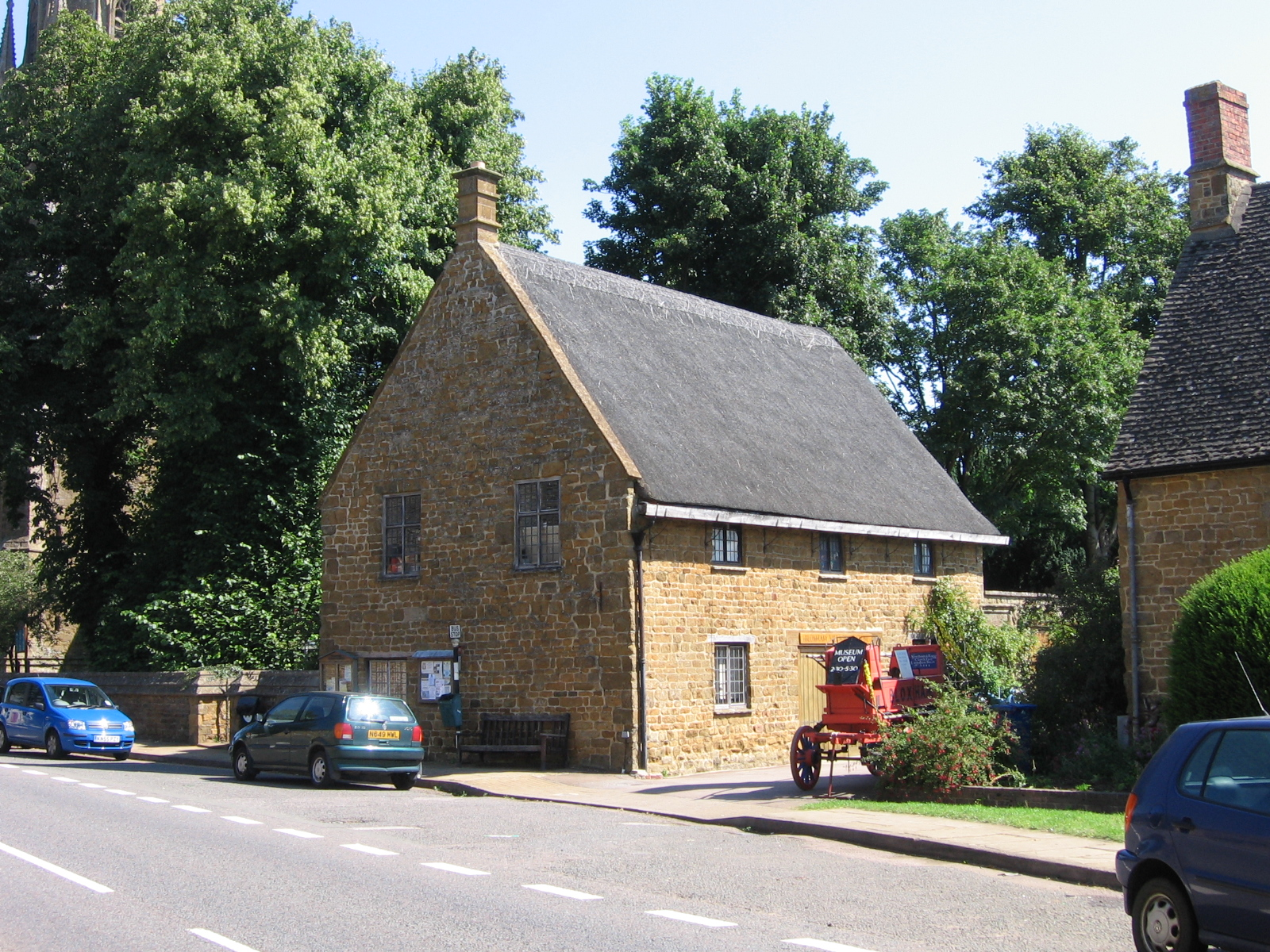
Bloxham Village Museum

Bloxham has two County schools. Bloxham Church of England primary school in Tadmarton Road is for pupils 5–11 years old. The Warriner School in Banbury Road is a technology college for pupils 11–16 years old.

Bloxham had several public houses, three of which are still trading:

- The Drum and Monkey
- The White Lion
- The Elephant & Castle, a 17th-century former coaching inn in Humber Street (Hook Norton Brewery).
- The Hawk and Partridge, opposite the church, ceased trading in 2006 and is now a private house.
- The Joiners Arms, is a 16th-century building in Old Bridge Road and is now a gastropub.
- The Red Lion, on the High Street, was closed by its owners, Fuller's Brewery, in summer 2013. The pub reopened in July 2016.

Bloxham has several shops on the High Street, including a post office, hairdressing salon, pharmacy, convenience store, newsagent and a fish and chip shop. Other amenities include a filling station, a GP's practice and a dental practice. Bloxham Football Club men's team plays in Division One of the Banbury District and Lord Jersey FA league. Bloxham FC also has a youth team, ten boys' teams and two girls' teams.

Bloxham Village Museum is in the Court House in a corner of St Mary's churchyard. This was rebuilt in the 1680s and retains some 14th-century details.

== Sources and further reading ==
- "End of line for 007's super car". Banbury Guardian. Johnston Press. 5 December 2003.
- Bloxham Conservation Area (PDF). Bodicote: Cherwell District Council.
- Healy, Tim. "Lofty ambitions". Oxfordshire Limited Edition. Newsquest Oxfordshire. – article about the parish church of Our Lady
- Knight, WFJ (1938). "A Romano-British Site at Bloxham" (PDF). Oxoniensia. III. Oxford Architectural and Historical Society: 41–56.
- Lobel, Mary D; Crossley, Alan, eds. (1969). A History of the County of Oxford. Victoria County History. Vol. 9: Bloxham Hundred. London: Oxford University Press for the Institute of Historical Research. pp. 53–85. ISBN 978-0-19722-726-8.
- Sherwood, Jennifer; Pevsner, Nikolaus (1974). Oxfordshire. The Buildings of England. Harmondsworth: Penguin Books. pp. 477–483. ISBN 0-14-071045-0.
- Sidey, Michael J. (2008). Appeal against Oxfordshire PCT decision with regard to the rurality of Bloxham.
- Walker, George Graham (1975). Churches of the Banbury Area. Kineton: Roundwood Press. ISBN 0-900093-52-8.
- Woodman, A Vere (1957). "The Buckinghamshire and Oxfordshire Rising of 1549" (PDF). Oxoniensia. XXII. Oxford Architectural and Historical Society: 78–84.
