= Charles Peers (barrister) =

English barrister

Charles Peers JP DL FSA DCL
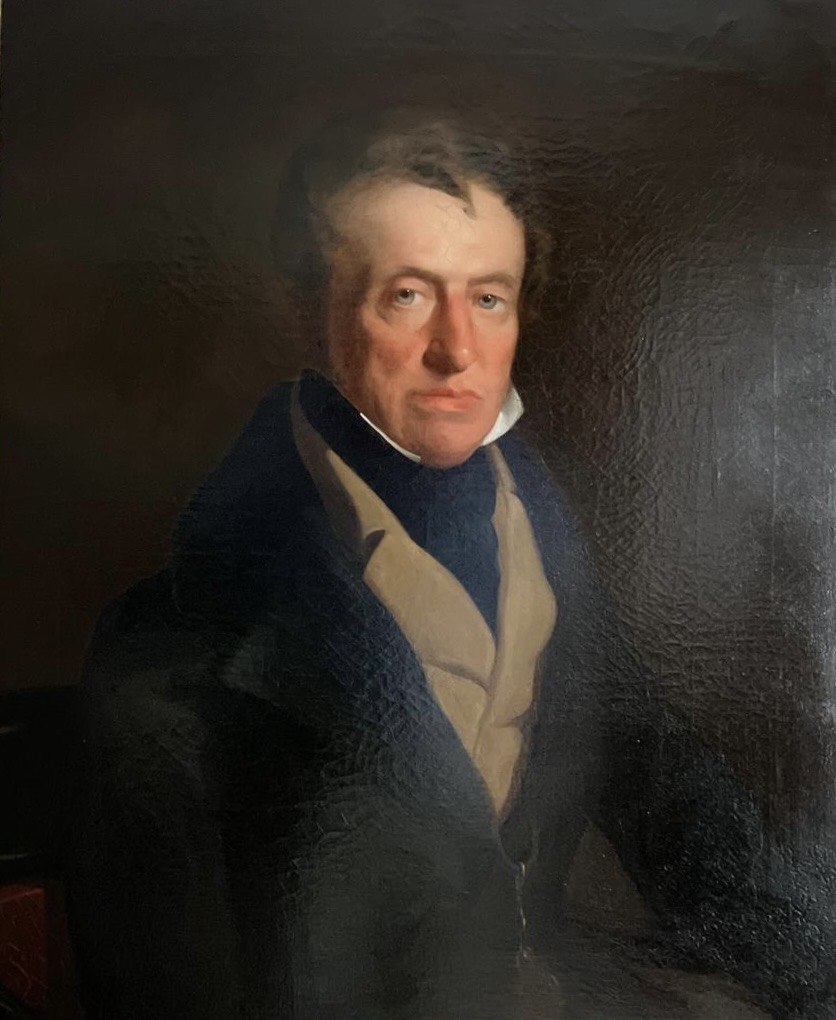
- Portrait of Charles Peers (1776–1853) unknown Artist
- Born: 1776
- Died: 1853 (aged 76–77); Chiselhampton, Oxfordshire, England
- Occupation(s): Magistrate, Landowner

Charles Peers DL JP (1776 – 1853) was a civic figure in Oxfordshire, English barrister and a land owner.

He was recorder of Henley-on-Themes, served as the High sheriff of Oxfordshire in 1821, Justice of the Peace, Oxfordshire. Academy Fellow of the Society of Antiquaries and a Doctor of Civil Law.

== Early life and family ==
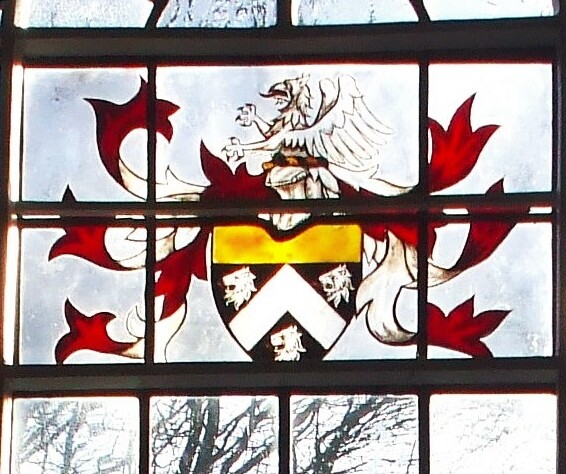
The Coat of arms and Crest, of the Peers family in St Katherine's Church, Chiselhampton.

Charles Peers was born in 1776, the son of Robert Peers (1742-1818), barrister and landowner of Chiselhampton House, Oxfordshire. His family was distinguished in mercantile and civic affairs: His grandfather, Charles Peers, Esq, (1703-1781), had built Chiselhampton House and served as High sheriff of Oxfordshire in 1756. Whilst Peers' great-grandfather, Sir Charles Peers (1661-1737), was Lord Mayor of London in 1715 and Chairman of the East India Company.

Peers was educated at Eton College before attending St John's College, Cambridge, where he graduated B.A in 1799 and M.A in 1804. He was admitted to the Inner Temple, becoming a barrister-at-law in 1802. He later received the degree of Doctor of Civil Law from Oxford University in 1820.

== Career ==
Peers maintained a role in Oxfordshire's Legal and civic life. He was noted as Recorder of Henley-on-Themes, the principal judicial officer of the borough. In 1821, Peers was appointed High Sheriff of Oxfordshire, the monarch's ceremonial and administrative representative in the county. The same year he was appointed Captain-Commandant of the Oxfordshire Yeomanry Cavalry, known as the QOOH. Peers was also a justice of the Peace (J.P.) for Oxfordshire, overseeing local justice, and was commissioned as a Deputy lieutenant (D.L.) of the county, by George Parker, 4th Earl of Macclesfield in 1831. He was a Fellow of the Society of Antiquaries.

== Personal life ==
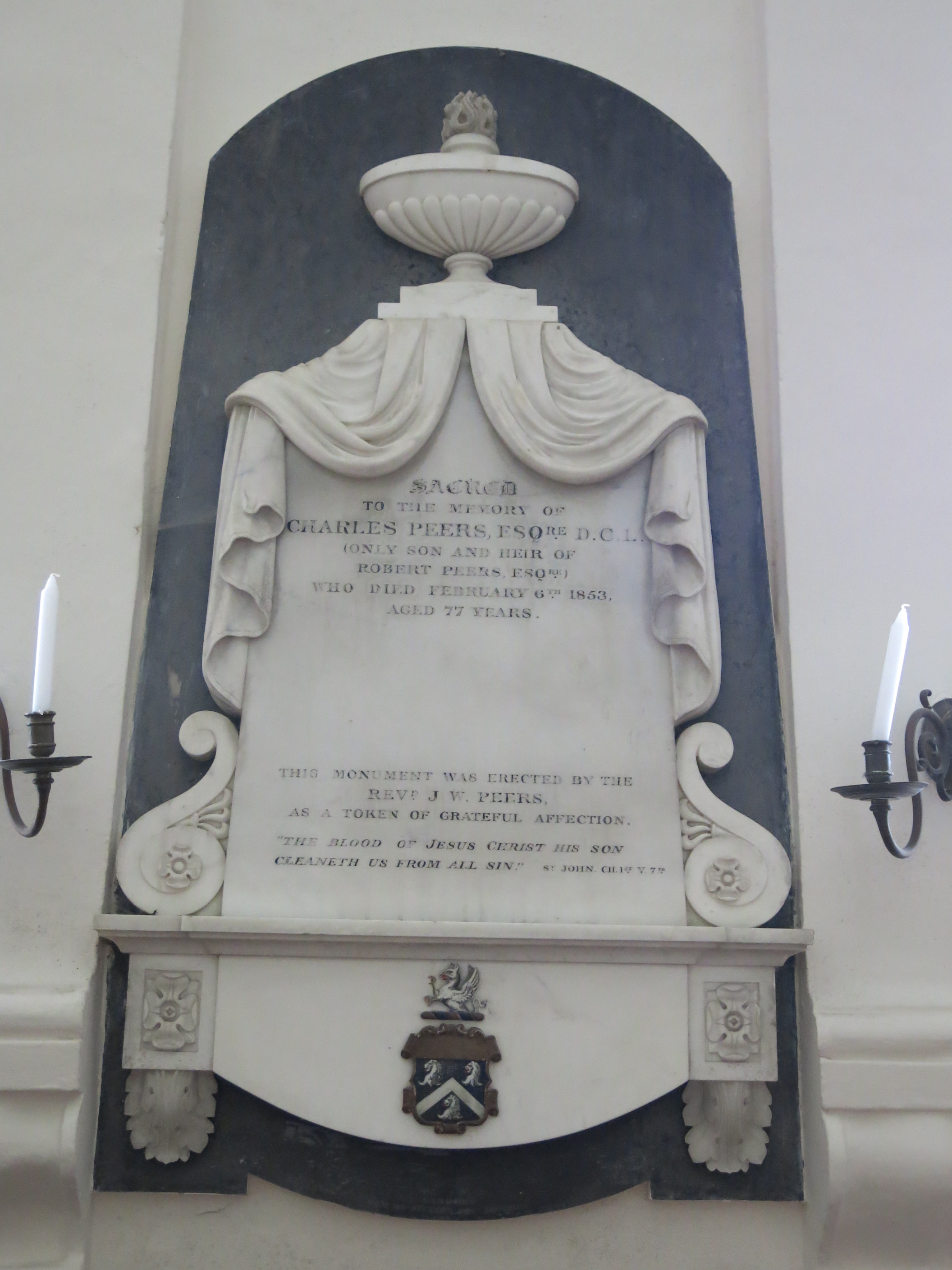
Memorial to Charles Peers in St Katherine's church.

In 1818 Charles Peers succeeded his father as the head of the Peers family, inheriting Chiselhampton House.

He died in 1853 aged 77, and was memorialised in St Katherine's Church, with a tablet commemorating his life. He died without heirs leaving the estate to his cousin, John Witherington Peers (1804-1876) Vicar of Tetsworth, the grandfather of Sir Charles Reed Peers.

== See also ==
- English gentry
- List of High Sheriffs of Oxfordshire
- Chiselhampton
- Oxfordshire Militia
- Antiquarianism
