= South Newington =

Village in Oxfordshire, England

Coordinates: 51.997°N 1.406°W

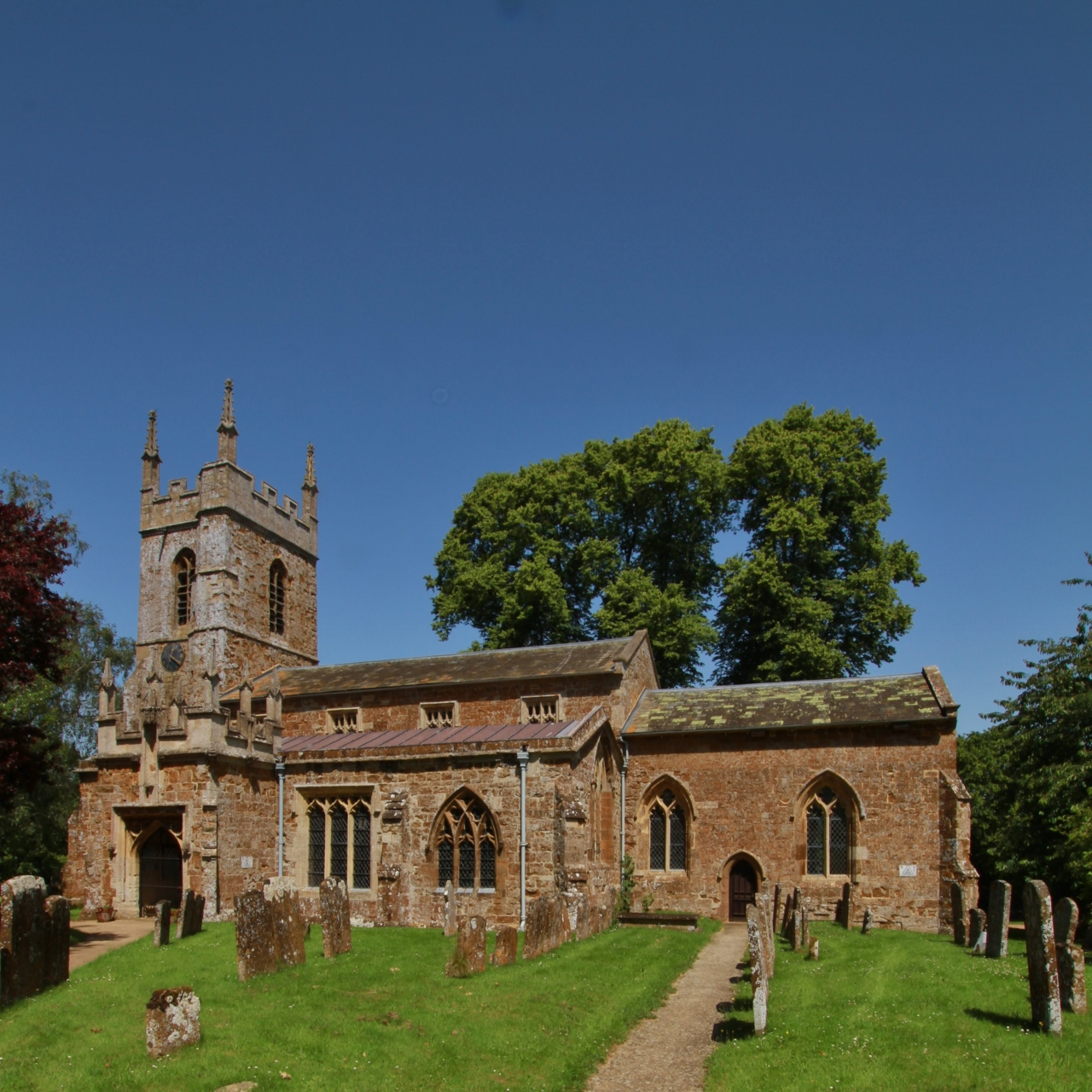
- Parish church of St Peter ad Vincula

- Location within Oxfordshire
- Area: 5.86 km^{2} (2.26 sq mi)
- Population: 285 (2011 census)
  - Density: 49/km^{2} (130/sq mi)
- OS grid reference: SP4033
- Civil parish: South Newington
- District: Cherwell
- Shire county: Oxfordshire
- Region: South East
- Country: England
- Sovereign state: United Kingdom
- Post town: Banbury
- Postcode district: OX15
- Dialling code: 01295
- Police: Thames Valley
- Fire: Oxfordshire
- Ambulance: South Central
- UK Parliament: Banbury
- Website: South Newington Village Website

South Newington is a village and civil parish on the south bank of the River Swere in the Cotswold Hills in Oxfordshire, England, about 5 miles (8 km) southwest of Banbury. The 2011 census recorded the parish's population as 285.

== Manors ==
Evidence of a Romano-British settlement has been found near the parish boundary on Iron Down, about 1 mile (1.6 km) south of the present village. The present village originated in Anglo-Saxon times. After the Norman Conquest of England, William the Conqueror granted the manor to Odo, Bishop of Bayeux, who was both his step-brother and one of his military commanders. It is recorded amongst Odo's estates in the Domesday Book of 1086.

By 1206 Odo of Bayeux's former manor was let to one William of Paris, after whom the village was sometimes called "Paris Newton". A few years later William granted the estate to Ralph Ivals, after whom the village was called "Newington Jewell". However, by about the same time it was also being called "South Newington" to distinguish it from North Newington about 4 miles (6.4 km) to the north. From the 13th to the 15th century the manor was held by the Cranford family, after whom the village was sometimes called "Newington Cranford". From the 13th to the 16th century a smaller manor in South Newington was held by the Giffard family.

In the reign of Henry II (1154–89) Hugh de Chacombe, lord of the manor of Chacombe in Northamptonshire founded a priory of Augustinian canons in Chacombe and gave it a yardland in the parish of South Newington. The priory's ownership of the land and a house on it was recorded in 1279. When the priory was suppressed in the dissolution of the monasteries in 1536 its property at South Newington passed to the Crown. The Crown sold the land to intermediaries or speculators, who sold it on to Magdalen College, Oxford.

== Church, chapel and meeting house ==
=== Church of England ===
South Newington's Church of England parish church is one of only 15 in England dedicated to St Peter ad Vincula ("St Peter in Chains"), after the basilica of San Pietro in Vincoli in Rome. It was originally a small late Norman church. At the end of the 13th century it was considerably extended and the bell tower was added. Further additions were made in the second half of the 15th century. The tower has a ring of five bells, the oldest of which was cast in 1656.

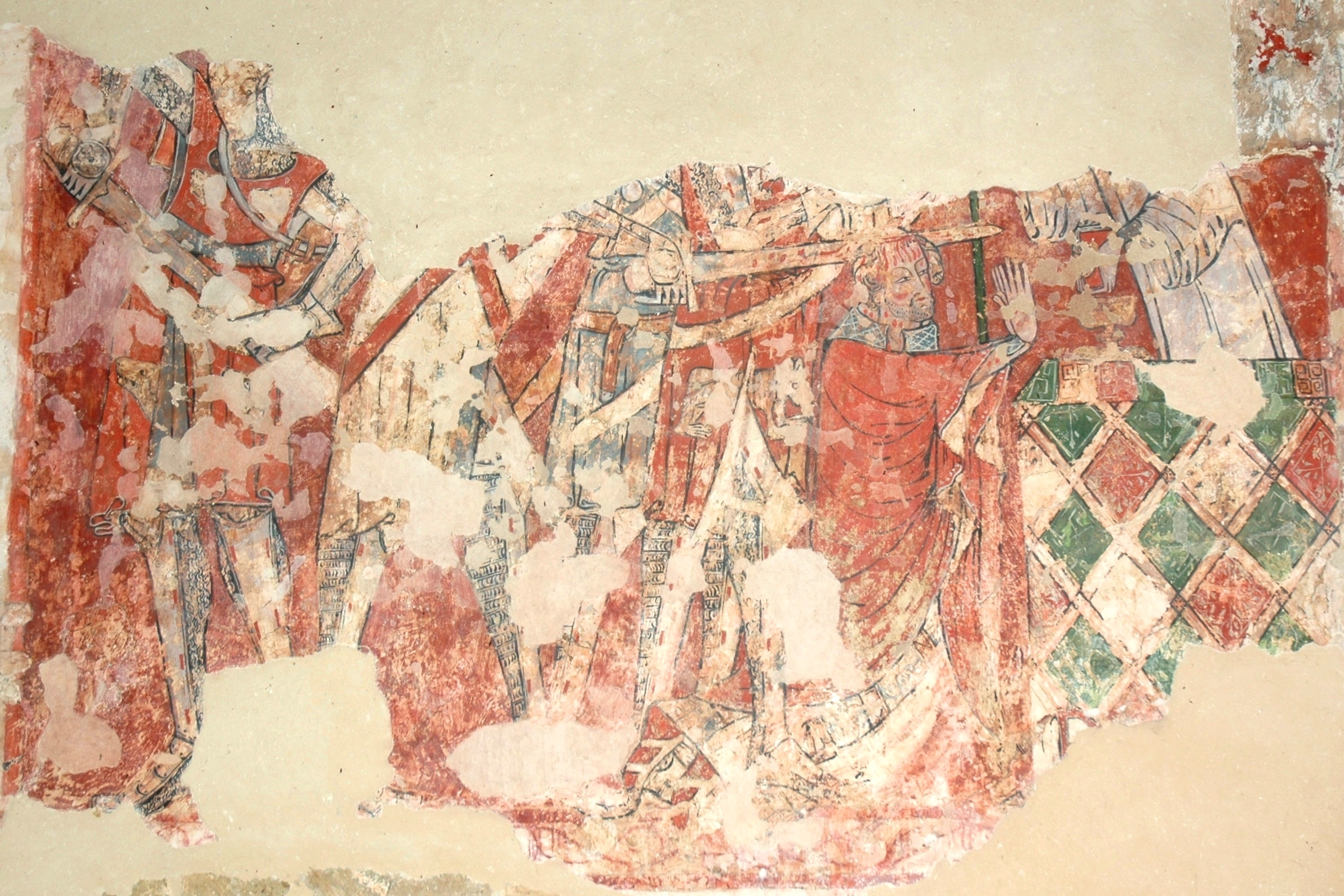
St Peter ad Vincula church: wall painting of Martydom of St Thomas Becket, 1330s

Around 1330–40 several very fine wall paintings were painted in the north aisle, probably commissioned by Thomas Giffard, lord of the smaller manor in South Newington, and his wife Margaret Mortayne. Over the chancel arch there are fragments of a Doom painting from the same period, but very little of it has survived. In the 15th or 16th century a Passion Cycle was painted in the nave above the arches to the north aisle. Its artistry is not of the same standard as the paintings in the north aisle, but it is of interest and some of its pictures show scenes not seen in passion cycles elsewhere.

St Peter ad Vincula was granted to the Benedictine abbey at Eynsham in the 1160s, and remained one of its possessions until the abbey was suppressed in the dissolution of the monasteries in 1538. In 1565 the advowson was passed to Exeter College, Oxford, which retained it until 1979. St Peter ad Vincula is now part of a single Church of England benefice with the parishes of Bloxham and Milcombe.

=== Society of Friends ===
By 1663 South Newington had a small group of Quakers. In 1692 they built a Friends Meeting House, in which they continued to meet until 1825. In 1925 the house was sold to the village, which converted it into the village hall.

=== Wesleyan Methodist ===
A Wesleyan congregation existed in the village by 1834. By 1854 the congregation was leasing the disused Friends' Meeting House for its meetings, and from 1857 it was reported to be Primitive Methodist. In 1875, the congregation opened its own Primitive Methodist Chapel. The chapel was closed in about 1939 and is now a private house.

== Ship Money ==
In 1629 King Charles I disbanded Parliament and tried to exercise Personal Rule. Lack of parliamentary support left Charles' treasury short of revenue, so in 1634 Charles revived the feudal tax of Ship Money which the Plantaganet kings had levied in the Middle Ages without recourse to Parliament. Ship Money was meant to be levied only in wartime and only in coastal counties and maritime towns, but in 1634 England was not at war and in 1635 Charles issued a second writ extending the tax to all inland counties. South Newington was assessed to pay £12 Ship Money, but Francis French, one of South Newington's parish constables, objected to the levy and ignored the writ.

The Sheriff of Oxford issued a warrant requiring that the £12 be paid, but the Calendar of State Papers Domestic records that French and Thomas Roberts, a very vocal opponent of the tax, replied "No money has been or can be gathered in the parish till the sheriff makes known to them a law or statute binding them unto". The sheriff then tried to enforce the tax by seizing £12 worth of livestock from the village. Roberts discouraged any residents of the hundreds of Bloxham and Banbury from buying the animals, and thereby still prevented the sheriff from realising the £12.

In October 1636 Charles I issued a third writ for Ship Money, provoking the more famous resistance of John Hampden, the Member of Parliament for Wendover in Buckinghamshire. Meanwhile, the South Newington case dragged on, and in May 1638 Roberts and another non-payer, Thomas Hall of Bodicote, were arrested and brought before the Privy Council charged with "undutiful speeches against the Board in general and Mr Comptroller in particular". Both men were discharged on condition that they behave themselves as "good subjects and civil men", but Roberts thereafter continued to call the Comptroller an "ugly rogue" with apparent impunity. Charles I's attempt to raise a tax without seeking parliament's approval continued to divide the Kingdom and was one of the factors that led to the outbreak of the English Civil War in January 1642.

== Social and economic history ==
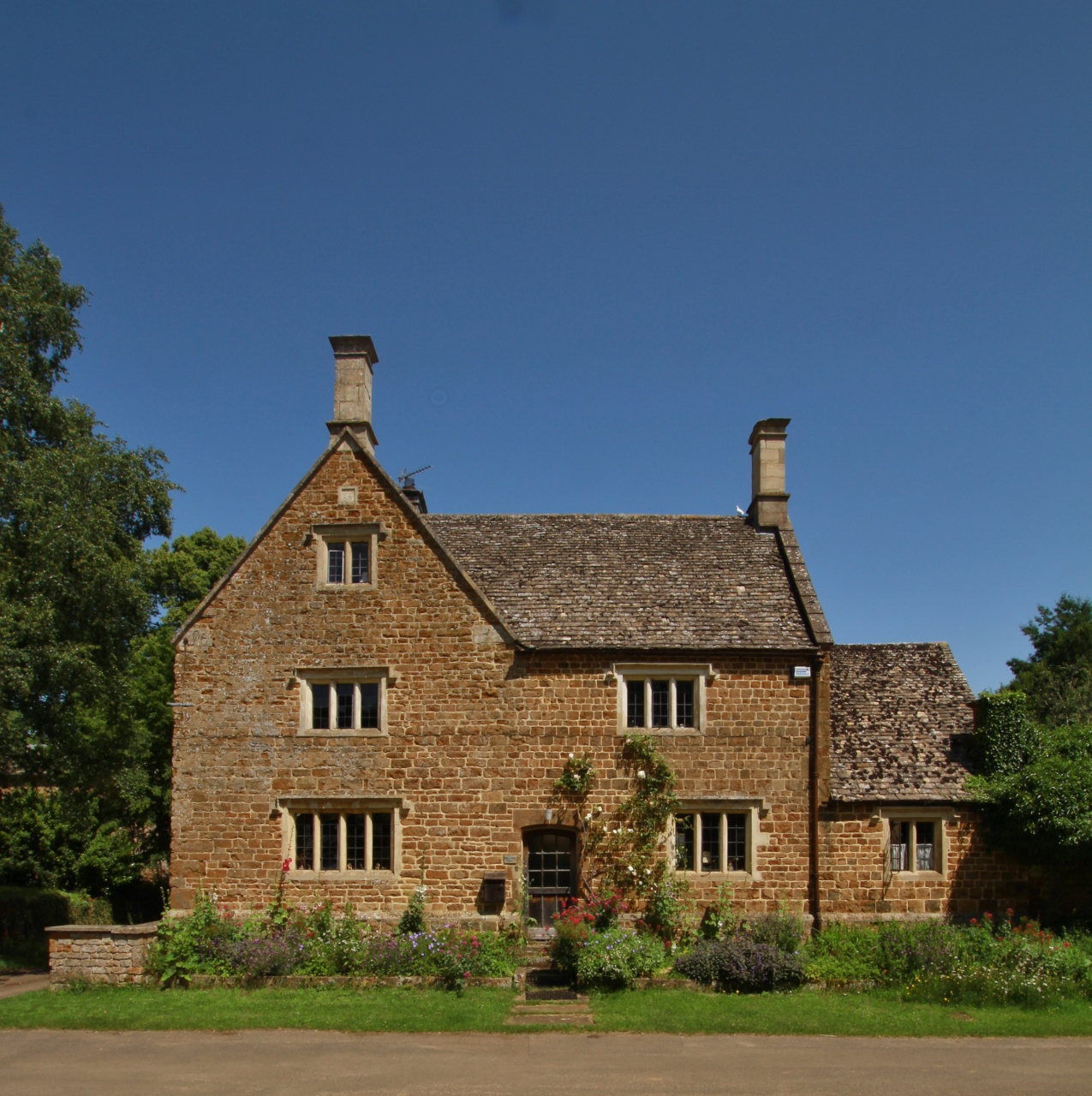
College Farmhouse, built in 1659

The Domesday Book records that in 1086 the village had two water mills. One ceased to exist in the Middle Ages but the other, north of the village, remained in use until at least the 19th century. The mill house survives but the leat has been diverted. In 1675 there was also a windmill north of the village. It had been removed by 1794, but the field where it stood continues to be called Windmill Furlong. Most of South Newington's buildings are built of local limestone. Several can be dated to the 17th or 18th century. College Farm, a yeoman's house next to the parish church, is a large, stone-roofed example dated 1659. It is a Grade II* listed building.

In the 18th century the village had four public houses: the Horse and Jockey, the Pole Axe, the Wykeham Arms and the Three Goats. The Three Goats seems to have been relatively short-lived and the Horse and Jockey had also ceased to be a pub by 1832. The Pole Axe was a large inn with stables and survived until 1887. In 1897 its buildings were given to the village as a reading room and hall. Patronage declined and in 1927 it was sold and most of its buildings demolished. The site was given back to the village in 1934 as a playground, in which use it remains today. The Wykeham Arms survived until the early 21st century, when its historic name was removed and it was turned into a restaurant called the Duck on the Pond.

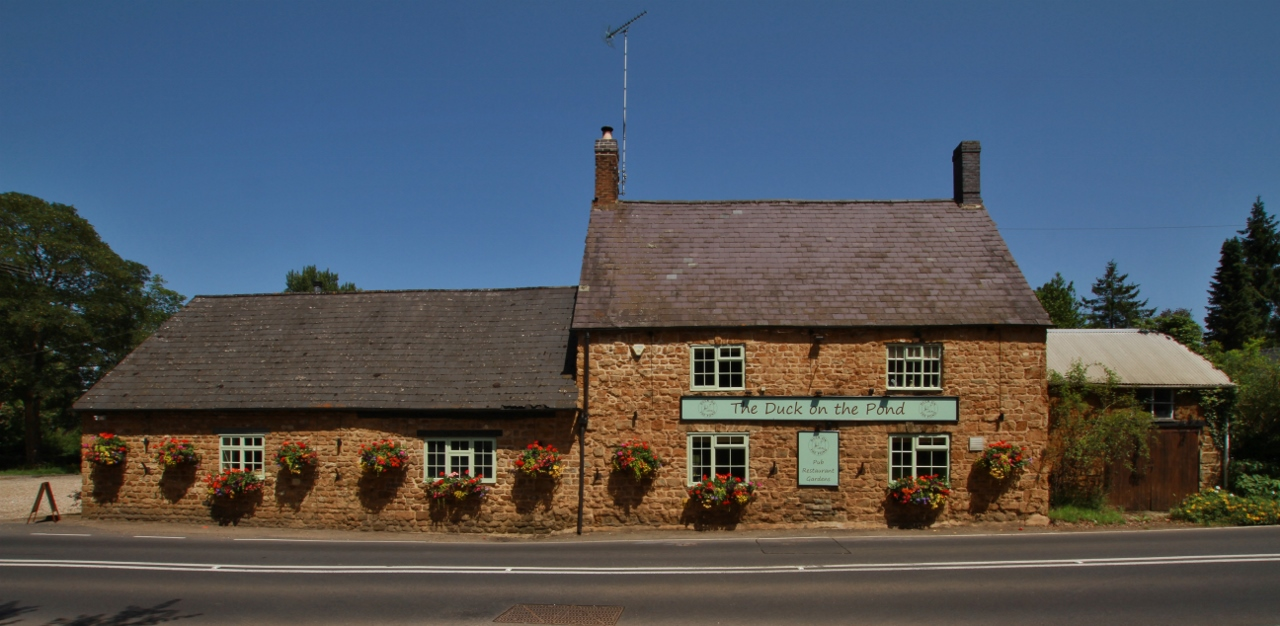
The Duck on the Pond restaurant: formerly the Wykham Arms pub

The main road between Banbury and Chipping Norton crosses the River Swere in South Newington. A stone bridge carrying the road over the river was mentioned as early as 1279. Another main road, from Deddington, joins the Banbury – Chipping Norton road 1 1/2 miles (2.4 km) southwest of the village. Both roads were made into turnpikes in 1770. South Newington's current bridge over the Swere includes an 18th-century stone three-arched structure that may have been built by the turnpike company. Both roads ceased to be turnpikes in 1871. In 1922 the Banbury – Chipping Norton road was classified as the A361. The former turnpike from Deddington is now the B4031.

Most of the parish's land was farmed in an open field system until 1795, when it was inclosed by Act of Parliament. In 1796 the village opened a workhouse but it had ceased to serve as such by 1803. Under the Poor Law Amendment Act 1834 South Newington became part of the Banbury Poor Law union, which sold off the cottages that the village had provided for housing its poor. A National School was opened by 1818, and in 1837 it moved to new building purpose-built premises. It was reorganised as a junior and infant school in 1929 and as an infant school in 1956. It was closed in 1965 and is now a private house. South Newington stands on Banbury ironstone. An application to quarry this iron ore southwest of the village was made in 1958, but in order to protect the beauty of the landscape the application was rejected.

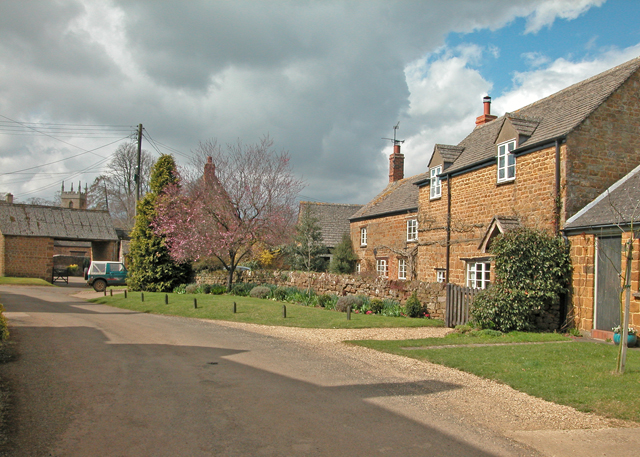
Moor Lane, near St Peter's parish church

== Sources ==
- Crossley, Alan (ed.); Baggs, AP; Colvin, Christina; Colvin, HM; Cooper, Janet; Day, CJ; Selwyn, Nesta; Tomkinson, A (1983). A History of the County of Oxford. Victoria County History. Vol. 11: Wootton Hundred (northern part). London: Oxford University Press for the Institute of Historical Research. pp. 143–159. ISBN 978-0-19722-758-9.
- Sherwood, Jennifer; Pevsner, Nikolaus (1974). Oxfordshire. The Buildings of England. Harmondsworth: Penguin Books. pp. 771–773. ISBN 0-14-071045-0.
- A Guide to St Peter ad Vincula South Newington. St Peter ad Vincula Parish Church.
