= Milcombe =

Village in Oxfordshire, England

Coordinates: 52.008°N 1.405°W

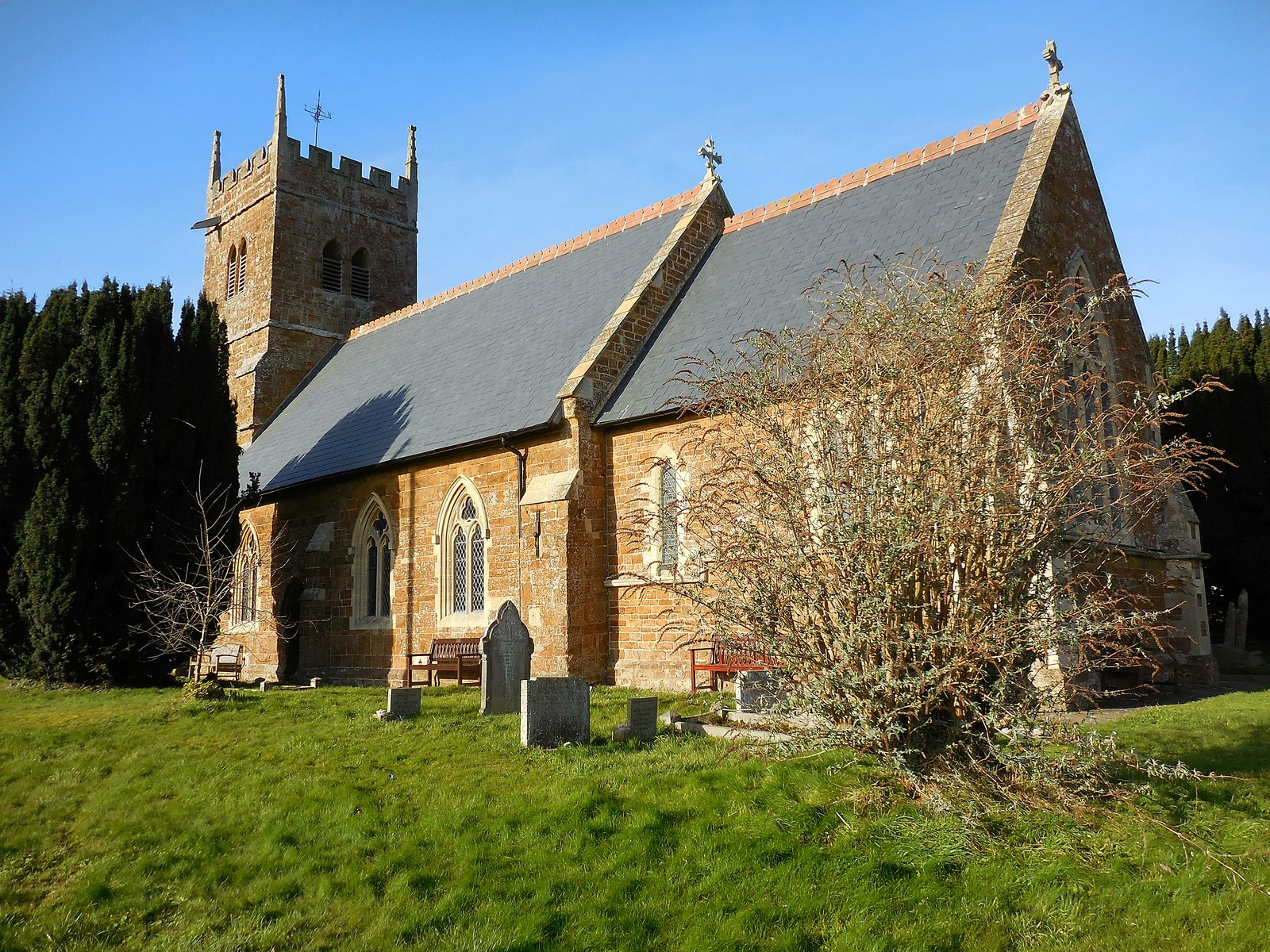
- St Laurence's church

- Location within Oxfordshire
- Area: 5.06 km^{2} (1.95 sq mi)
- Population: 613 (2011 census)
  - Density: 121/km^{2} (310/sq mi)
- OS grid reference: SP4134
- Civil parish: Milcombe
- District: Cherwell
- Shire county: Oxfordshire
- Region: South East
- Country: England
- Sovereign state: United Kingdom
- Post town: Banbury
- Postcode district: OX15
- Dialling code: 01295
- Police: Thames Valley
- Fire: Oxfordshire
- Ambulance: South Central
- UK Parliament: Banbury

Milcombe is a village and civil parish about 5 miles (8 km) southwest of Banbury, Oxfordshire.

== History ==
The Church of England parish church of Saint Laurence was built in the 13th century, but little survives from this period except for the west tower. The font is the 15th century. In the 19th century the building was in very poor condition, so in 1860 the Gothic Revival architect G.E. Street, rebuilt the chancel and most of the nave. The parish benefice is now combined with those of Bloxham and South Newington.

Milcombe House was a large 17th-century house. Most of it was demolished in 1953, but a small part has been retained as a farmhouse. Some outbuildings of the hall survive: an 18th-century dovecote and part of the 17th century stables. By about 1875 the Banbury and Cheltenham Direct Railway had been built through the parish. It passed very close to the village in a cutting at the foot of Fern Hill. The nearest station was Bloxham, 1 mile (1.6 km) away. British Railways closed Bloxham station in 1951 and closed the Banbury and Cheltenham railway completely in 1964, but the disused cutting beside Milcombe village remains.

== Amenities ==
Milcombe has a 17th-century public house, the Horse and Groom. The village hall is converted from a set of 17th-century cottages. Milcombe has a village shop. In 2009 a Women's Institute was founded in Milcombe.

== Sources ==
- Crossley, Alan (ed.); Baggs, A.P.; Colvin, Christina; Colvin, H.M.; Cooper, Janet; Day, C.J.; Selwyn, Nesta; Tomkinson, A. (1983). A History of the County of Oxford, Volume 11: Wootton Hundred (northern part). Victoria County History. pp. 143–158. ISBN 978-0-19722-758-9.
- Sherwood, Jennifer; Pevsner, Nikolaus (1974). Oxfordshire. The Buildings of England. Harmondsworth: Penguin Books. pp. 704–705. ISBN 0-14-071045-0.
