= William Clarke =

William or Bill Clarke may refer to:

== Entertainment ==
- William Clarke (writer) (1800–1838), British children's writer
- William Hanna Clarke (1882–1924), dentist, then an artist, from Glasgow, Scotland
- William Clarke (musician) (1951–1996), blues harmonica player
- Will Clarke (novelist) (born 1970), American novelist
- William Clarke, a.k.a. Bunny Rugs (1948–2014), lead singer for the band Third World

== Politics ==
- William Clarke (MP for Amersham) (c. 1575–1626), English MP for Amersham
- William Clarke (English politician) (c. 1623–1666), English politician and Secretary to the Council of the Army
- William Clarke (mayor), American mayor of Jersey City, New Jersey, 1869
- William Clarke (Australian politician) (1843–1903), Australian businessman and parliamentarian
- William Clarke (Fabian) (1852–1901), English socialist activist
- William Aurelius Clarke (1868–1940), Canadian politician in Ontario
- William J. Clarke (1819–1886), American politician, judge of the North Carolina Superior Court
- William John Turner Clarke (1805–1874), Australian politician, member of the Victorian Legislative Council
- William Penn Clarke (1817–1903), American journalist, lawyer, and politician in Iowa
- William Alexander Clarke, a.k.a. Alexander Bustamante (1884–1977), first prime minister of Jamaica
- Bill Clarke (politician) (born 1933), Canadian MP for Vancouver Quadra, 1973–1984

== Sports ==
=== Football ===
- William Clarke (footballer, fl. 1897–1900), English football forward with Lincoln City in the late 1890s
- William Clarke (footballer, born 1909) (1909–?), for Bradford City
- Bill Clarke (Australian footballer) (1882–1945), Australian rules footballer
- Bill Clarke (Canadian football) (1932–2000), Canadian football defensive lineman
- Bill Clarke (football manager), English Carlisle United F.C. manager, 1933–1935
- Bill Clarke (footballer, born 1880) (1880–?), English footballer with Sheffield United, Northampton Town and Southampton
- Bill Clarke (footballer, born 1916) (1916–1986), English footballer with Leicester City, Exeter and Southampton
- Willie Clarke (footballer) (1878–1940), Scottish footballer
- Billy Clarke (footballer, born 1987), Irish footballer
- Will Clarke (American football) (William Clarke Jr., born 1991), American football player

=== Cricket ===
- William Clarke (cricketer, born 1798) (1798–1856), English cricketer and team manager
- William Grasett Clarke (1821–1893), English cricketer
- William Clarke (Barbadian cricketer) (1841–1907), Barbadian cricketer
- William Clarke (cricketer, born 1846) (1846–1902), English cricketer
- William Clarke (cricketer, born 1849) (1849–1935), English cricketer

=== Other sports ===
- Boileryard Clarke (William Jones Clarke, 1868–1959), American Major League Baseball player
- William Clarke (athlete) (1873–?), British Olympic runner
- Will Clarke (cyclist) (born 1985), Australian road cyclist
- Will Clarke (triathlete) (born 1985), British triathlete
- Bill Clarke (died 2018), British professional wrestler, best known as the masked King Kendo

== Science ==
- William Clarke (apothecary) (1609–1682), English apothecary associated with Isaac Newton
- William Clarke (English physician) (c. 1640 – 1684), English physician
- William Branwhite Clarke (1798–1878), English geologist and clergyman, active in Australia
- William Barnard Clarke (1806–1865), English architect, cartographer and translator
- William Barnard Clarke (physician) (1807–1894), English physician and curator
- William Eagle Clarke (1853–1938), British ornithologist
- William Clarke (Canadian physician) (died 1887), Irish-born physician and politician in Ontario, Canada
- William James Clarke (1871–1945), English naturalist and folklorist

== Other people ==
- William Clarke (justice) (died c. 1706), Delaware justice, chief justice of the Pennsylvania Supreme Court
- William Clarke (antiquary) (1696–1771), English cleric and antiquary
- William Clarke (industrialist) (1831–1890), English industrialist, co-founder of Clarke Chapman
- Sir William Clarke, 1st Baronet (1831–1897), Australian businessman
- William Clarke (cryptographer) (1883–1961), British British intelligence officer and cryptographer
- William Davis Clarke (born 1941), American diplomat
- William Francis Clarke (1816–1890), American Jesuit educator
- W. G. Clarke William George Clarke (1859–1943), South Australian Methodist minister
- William P. O. Clarke (1893–1949), U.S. Navy admiral during World War II
- William Robinson Clarke (1895–1981), British World War I pilot who was the first black pilot to fly for Britain
- William Wiseman Clarke (1759–1826), high sheriff of Berkshire
- William Clarke (United Kingdom railway contractor), designer of British railway stations, see Portesham railway station

== Other uses ==
- William Clarke & Son, a tobacco company founded in 1830 in Cork, Ireland
- William Clarke Estate, a historic home in Orange Park, Florida
- William Clarke College, an Anglican co-educational high school in Kellyville, New South Wales, Australia

== See also ==
- William Clark (disambiguation)
- William Clerke (disambiguation)
- Willie Clarke (disambiguation)
- Will Clarke (disambiguation)
