= William Clerke =

William Clerke may refer to:

- William Clerke (MP) (died 1587), MP for Devizes, Wilton and Calne
- William Clerke (writer)
- Sir William Clerke, 2nd Baronet (1643–1678), of the Clerke baronets
- Sir William Clerke, 3rd Baronet (c. 1662–1699), of the Clerke baronets
- Sir William Clerke, 5th Baronet (died c. 1738), of the Clerke baronets
- Sir William Clerke, 8th Baronet (1751–1818), of the Clerke baronets
- Sir William Henry Clerke, 9th Baronet (1793–1861), of the Clerke baronets
- Sir William Henry Clerke, 10th Baronet (1822–1882), of the Clerke baronets
- Sir William Francis Clerke, 11th Baronet (1856–1930), of the Clerke baronets

== See also ==
- William Clerk (disambiguation)
- William Clarke (disambiguation)
