= William Clark (disambiguation) =

William Clark (1770–1838) was an American soldier and explorer; governor of Missouri Territory.

William Clark may also refer to:

== Business ==
- W. H. Clark (brewer) (William Henry Clark, c. 1815–c. 1870), brewer in South Australia
- William Bell Clark (1889–1968), American advertising executive and naval historian
- William Clark (stockbroker), Australian financier and racehorse owner in London

== Entertainment ==
- Bill Clark (screenwriter) (born 1944), former New York Police Department detective and television writer
- William Clark (artist) (1803–1883), Scottish marine painter
- William Andrews Clark Jr. (1877–1934), American violinist and founder of the Los Angeles Philharmonic
- Bill Clark (musician) (1925–1986), American jazz drummer
- Billy C. Clark (1928–2009), American author

== Military ==
- William A. Clark (soldier) (1828–1916), American Civil War soldier and Medal of Honor recipient
- William Philo Clark (1845–1884), U.S. Army officer
- William Leon Clark (1911–2005), Deputy Chief of Chaplains of the U.S. Air Force

== Politics ==
=== Australia ===
- William Clark (Australian politician) (1844–1900), Australian politician and newspaper proprietor

=== Canada ===
- William George Clark (politician) (1865–1948), Canadian politician
- William Harold Clark (1869–1913), Canadian politician in Alberta
- William Mortimer Clark (1836–1915), Canadian politician
- Keir Clark (William Keir Clark; 1910–2010), Canadian merchant and political figure in Prince Edward Island

=== United Kingdom ===
- William D. Clark (1916–1985), economist and first director of the Overseas Development Institute
- William Clark, Baron Clark of Kempston (1917–2004), British politician (MP for Croydon South)
- William Henry Clark (1876–1952), British civil servant and diplomat
- William Moore Wallis Clark (1897–1971), Ulster Unionist member of the Senate of Northern Ireland

=== United States ===
- William Clark (merchant) (1670–1742), merchant and town official in Boston, Massachusetts
- William Clark (congressman) (1774–1851), US Congressman from Pennsylvania and U.S. Treasurer
- Billy J. Clark (1778–1866), American physician and politician from New York
- William Clark Jr. (1798–1871), American politician and signatory to the Texas Declaration of Independence
- William Clark Jr. (diplomat) (1930–2008), former US Ambassador to India
- William Clark (politician, born 1811) (1811–1885), New York politician
- William A. Clark (1839–1925), copper baron and US Senator from Montana
- William A. Clark (Maryland politician) (born 1958), American politician from Maryland
- William G. Clark (1924–2001), American jurist and politician
- William G. Clark Jr. (1912–1990), American jurist and politician in Massachusetts
- William P. Clark Jr. (1931–2013), American politician, and US Secretary of the Interior
- Ramsey Clark (William Ramsey Clark; 1927–2021), American politician, US Attorney General
- William Thomas Clark (1831–1905), American soldier and Congressman from Texas, 1869–1872
- William Walter Clark (1885–1971), American politician from Wisconsin
- William White Clark (1819–1883), Confederate politician

== Religion ==
- William Clark (Roman Catholic priest) (died 1603), English Roman Catholic priest and conspirator
- William Clark (bishop) (died 1925), Canadian Anglican bishop
- William Hawley Clark (1919–1997), bishop of the Episcopal Diocese of Delaware
- William Robinson Clark (1829–1912), Canadian theologian
- William Clark (Anglican priest), Massachusetts cleric

== Science ==
- William Andrew Clark (1911–1983), British botanist
- William Bullock Clark (1860–1917), American geologist
- William Inglis Clark (1855–1932), Scottish pharmaceutical chemist
- William J. Clark, Scottish orthodontist

== Sports ==
=== Football and rugby ===
- Bill Clark (American football) (born 1968), retired college football coach
- Bill Clark (Australian footballer) (1922–2015), Australian rules footballer
- Bill Clark (rugby union) (1929–2010), New Zealand rugby player
- Billy Clark (footballer, born 1881) (1881–1937), Scottish football player
- Billy Clark (footballer, born 1967), English football player
- Billy Clark (footballer, born 1991), English football player
- William Clark (football manager), Scottish football manager
- William Dennison Clark (1885–1932), American football player
- William Clarke (footballer, fl. 1897–1900), also known as Billy Clark, football player for Lincoln City and Aberdeen F.C.
- Willie Clarke (footballer) (1878–1940), born William Clark, Scottish football player for Aston Villa, Bradford and Bristol Rovers
- Willie Clark (footballer, born 1932) (William Clark, 1932–2006), Scottish football player for QPR

=== Other sports ===
- William Clark (archer) (1842–1913), American Olympic archer
- William Clark (boxer) (1899–1988), American boxer who competed in the 1920 Summer Olympics
- William Clark (skier) (1910–1975), Canadian skier and Olympic competitor
- Will Clark (William Nuschler Clark, Jr., born 1964), American professional baseball player
- Bill Clark (basketball) (born 1988), American basketball player
- Willie Clark (baseball) (William Otis Clark, 1872–1932), American baseball player
- Willie Clark (ice hockey) (William McLean Clark, born 1931), British ice hockey player

== Professors ==
- William Clark (anatomist) (1788–1869), Professor of Anatomy at Cambridge University
- William George Clark (1821–1878), British scholar of Shakespearean literature
- William S. Clark (1826–1886), American agricultural scientist and educator at University of Massachusetts
- William W. Clark (1940–2025), professor of art history
- William C. Clark (born 1948), American ecologist and environmental policy analyst
- William A. V. Clark (born 1938), professor of geography
- William Mansfield Clark (1884–1964), American chemist

== Other ==
- William Tierney Clark (1783–1852), English engineer and bridge designer
- William Clark (inventor) (1821–1880), British civil engineer and inventor
- William Nairne Clark (1804–1854), public notary and publisher in Australia
- William Ovens Clark (1849–1937), barrister and judge in British India
- William Clark (judge) (1891–1957), American federal judge

== See also ==
- William Clarke (disambiguation)
- William Clark Jr. (disambiguation)
- William H. Clark (disambiguation)
- Will Clark (disambiguation)
- Willie Clark (disambiguation)
- William Clerk (disambiguation)
