= List of Carlisle United F.C. managers =

Carlisle United have had over 40 managers since the club was founded in 1904. Amongst others they include Bill Shankly, a former United player who went on to make Liverpool Football League champions three times, Alan Ashman, who took Carlisle to the top of The Football League and Michael Knighton who in 1997 took over the management role while he was chairman.

== Managerial history ==
Information correct as of 17 January 2025.

- (n/a) = Information not available

Name	Nationality	To	Honours Honours	
Rob Elliot	Ireland	28 May 2026	Present	
Mark Hughes	Wales	6 February 2025	28 May 2026	
Greg Abbott; Gavin Skelton (Caretaker)	England; England	3 February 2025	6 February 2025	
Mike Williamson	England	19 September 2024	3 February 2025	
Mark Birch; Steven Rudd; Jamie Devitt (Caretaker)	England; England; Ireland	31 August 2024	19 September 2024	
Paul Simpson	England	23 February 2022	31 August 2024	EFL League Two play-off winners: 2022–23
Keith Millen	England	26 October 2021	23 February 2022	
Gavin Skelton (Caretaker)	England	10 October 2021	26 October 2021	
Chris Beech	England	26 November 2019	10 October 2021	
Gavin Skelton (Caretaker)	England	13 November 2019	26 November 2019	
Steven Pressley	Scotland	16 January 2019	13 November 2019	
Tommy Wright; Paul Murray (Caretaker)	Scotland; England	4 January 2019	16 January 2019	
John Sheridan	Ireland	5 June 2018	4 January 2019	
Colin West (Caretaker)	England	8 May 2018	5 June 2018	
Keith Curle	England	19 September 2014	8 May 2018	
Tony Caig; Paul Thirlwell (Caretaker)	England; England	1 September 2014	19 September 2014	
Graham Kavanagh	Ireland	1 October 2013	1 September 2014	
Graham Kavanagh; Davie Irons; Tony Caig (Caretaker)	Ireland; Scotland; England	9 September 2013	1 October 2013	
Greg Abbott	England	5 December 2008	9 September 2013	Football League Trophy Winners: 2010/2011; Runners-up: 2009/2010
Greg Abbott (Caretaker)	England	3 November 2008	5 December 2008	
John Ward	England	October 2007	3 November 2008	
Greg Abbott (Caretaker)	England	13 August 2007	October 2007	
Neil McDonald	England	17 June 2006	13 August 2007	
Paul Simpson	England	29 August 2003	17 June 2006	League Two championship Winners: 2005/2006 Football League Trophy Runners-up: 2005/2006; Football Conference promotion play-off Winners: 2004/2005
Roddy Collins	Ireland	July 2002	August 2003	Football League Trophy Runners-up: 2002/2003
Billy Barr (Caretaker)	England	April 2002	July 2002	
Roddy Collins	Ireland	July 2001	April 2002	
Ian Atkins	England	2000	2001	
Martin Wilkinson	England	25 June 1999	10 May 2000	
Keith Mincher	England	18 June 1999	25 June 1999	
Nigel Pearson	England	1998	1999	
Michael Knighton; Dave Wilkes; John Halpin	England; England; England	1997	1998	
Dave Wilkes(Caretaker)	England	1997	1997	
Mervyn Day	England	1996	1997	Football League Second Division Third Runners-up: 1996/1997 Football League Trophy Winners: 1996/1997
Mick Wadsworth	England	1993	1996	Football League Second Division Winners: 1994/1995 Football League Trophy Runners-up: 1995/1996
David McCreery	Northern Ireland	1992	1994	
Aidan McCaffery	England	1991	1992	
Clive Middlemass	England	1987	1991	
Harry Gregg	Northern Ireland	1986	1987	
Bob Stokoe	England	1985	1986	
Pop Robson	England	1985	1985	
Bob Stokoe	England	1980	1985	Football League Third Division Runners-up: 1981/1982
Martin Harvey	Northern Ireland	1980	1980	
Bobby Moncur	Scotland	1976	1980	
Dick Young	England	1975	1976	
Alan Ashman	England	1972	1975	Football League Second Division Third Runners-up: 1973/1974
Ian MacFarlane	Scotland	1970	1972	
Bob Stokoe	England	1968	1970	
Tim Ward	England	1967	1968	
Alan Ashman	England	1963	1967	Football League Third Division Winners: 1964/1965 Football League Fourth Division Runners-up: 1963/1964
Ivor Powell	Wales	1960	1963	
Andy Beattie	Scotland	1958	1960	
Fred Emery	England	1951	1958	
Bill Shankly	Scotland	1949	1951	
Ivor Broadis	England	1946	1949	
Bill Clarke (Secretary-Manager)	(n/a)	1945	1946	
Howard Harkness	(n/a)	1940	1945	
David Taylor	Scotland	1938	1940	
Fred Westgarth	England	1936	1938	
Bob Kelly	England	1935	1936	
Bill Clarke	(n/a)	1933	1935	
Billy Hampson	England	1930	1933	
George Bistow	(n/a)	1913	1930	North Eastern League Winners: 1921/1922 Runners-up: 1927/1928
Dave Graham	(n/a)	1912	1913	
Jack Houston	(n/a)	1910	1912	
Bert Stansfield	England	1908	1910	
Jack Houston (Secretary-Manager)	(n/a)	1906	1908	Lancashire Combination Division Two Winners: 1906/1907 Lancashire Combination Division One Runners-up: 1907/1908
McCumiskey (Secretary-Manager)	(n/a)	1905	1906	
Harry Kirkbride (Secretary-Manager)	(n/a)	1904	1905	
