= Mincher =

Mincher is a surname. Notable people with the surname include:

- Don Mincher (1938–2012), American baseball player and executive
- Ed Mincher (1851–1918), American baseball player
- Keith Mincher, English football manager and sports psychologist
