= William Clerk =

William Clerk may refer to:

- William Clerk (administrator), clerk to the Privy Chamber of Henry VIII of England
- William Clerk (jurist) (died 1655)
- William Clerk (MP died 1415) for Weymouth and Melcombe Regis
- William Clerk (MP for Wycombe) (fl.1399-1420), MP and mayor
- William Clerk (MP for Calne), in 1415, MP for Calne
- William Clerk (MP for Northampton), in 1417, MP for Northampton

== See also ==
- William the Clerk
- William Clerke (disambiguation)
- William Clark (disambiguation)
