= McWethy =

McWethy is a surname. Notable people with the surname include:

- Edgar Lee McWethy Jr. (1944–1967), United States Army soldier, recipient of the Medal of Honor for his actions in the Vietnam War
- John McWethy (1947–2008), American journalist
- Robert D. McWethy (1920–2018), United States Navy officer and submariner

== See also ==
- McWethy Troop Medical Clinic at San Antonio Military Medical Center
