= William Clark Jr. =

William Clark Jr. is the name of:

- William Clark Jr. (1798–1871), American politician and signatory of the Texas Declaration of Independence
- William Andrews Clark Jr. (1877–1934), American violinist, and founder of the Los Angeles Philharmonic; son of William Andrews Clark Sr.
- William P. Clark Jr. (1931–2013), U.S. Secretary of the Interior from 1983 to 1985
- William Clark Jr. (diplomat) (1930–2008), United States Ambassador to India, 1992–1993
- William G. Clark Jr. (1912–1990), American jurist and politician in Massachusetts

== See also ==
- William Clark (disambiguation)
