= Will Clark (disambiguation) =

Will Clark is an American baseball player.

Will Clark may also refer to:

- Will Clark (actor) (born 1968), performer in gay porn films

== See also ==
- Will Clarke (disambiguation)
- William Clark (disambiguation)
