= Elizabeth Rhodes =

British governess, housekeeper and Methodist leader

- Born: 1759; Scotland
- Died: 17 April 1836 (aged 76–77); Maidstone, England
- Occupations: governess, housekeeper and Methodist leader

Elizabeth Rhodes born Elizabeth Brittan (1759 – 17 April 1836) was a British governess, housekeeper and Methodist leader.

== Life ==
Rhodes was born in Scotland with the name Brittan. Her mother was from York and her father was a Captain in the Queen's Regiment of Dragoon Guards until 1760. They moved to York where in 1765 her father left the home with their maid.

During the 1770s she tried living with her aunt and uncle in Manchester but she returned to York. She rediscovered her father in Surrey where he was living with another woman.

Sir James Pennyman, 6th Baronet employed the Rhodes during the later 1770s as a governess to his daughter. Rhodes witnessed the Gordon Riots from Pennyman's home in 1780. Her biographer estimates that she was converted to Methodism in about 1784 by followers in Beverley and York. Sir William Clerke, 8th Baronet employed Rhodes as his housekeeper. Clerke wanted to marry her but he didn't like her Methodism. Elizabeth preferred Methodism and married Benjamin Rhodes. Clerke's religious scruples didn't interfere with business. He sold land to the Methodists arguing that did not mind if they "covered the whole land with chapels". She later recorded that she obtained Christian perfection on 7 January 1788.

Around 1810 she and her three daughters were operating a school for girls. In 1812 her youngest daughter, Hannah, died painfully following her dress catching fire. In 1829 she published her "Memoirs" which are the basis of her biography and they also give an insight into the temptations offered to a single woman. The book includes details of Hannah's death and some of her late husband's poetry.

Rhodes died in Maidstone.

== Private life ==
She married an itinerant preacher named Benjamin Rhodes who had been born in 1743 in Mexboorough. He had by 1766 become one of John Wesley's Methodist lay preachers. They married in Bolton on 4 January 1787 and they had three daughters. He died in 1815 having written a number of hymns.
