= Willie Clarke =

Willie Clarke may refer to:

- Willie Clarke (politician) (born 1966), Irish republican politician from Northern Ireland
- Willie Clarke (songwriter), American musician and songwriter
- Willie Clarke (footballer) (1878–1949), Scottish footballer

== See also ==
- Willie Clark (disambiguation)
- William Clarke (disambiguation)
