= William H. Clark =

William H. Clark may refer to:

- William Harold Clark (1869–1913), Canadian politician
- Sir William Henry Clark (1876–1952), British civil servant and diplomat
- William Hawley Clark (1919–1997), bishop of the Episcopal Diocese of Delaware
- W. H. Clark (brewer) (William Henry Clark), brewer in South Australia
- William Harvey Clark, member of the 104th New York State Legislature

== See also ==
- William Clark (disambiguation)
