= Will Clarke =

Will Clarke may refer to:

- Will Clarke (American football) (born 1991), American football player
- Will Clarke (novelist) (born 1970), American novelist
- Will Clarke (triathlete) (born 1985), British triathlete
- Will Clarke (cyclist) (born 1985), Australian road cyclist

== See also ==
- Will Clark (disambiguation)
- William Clarke (disambiguation)
