= Willie Clark =

Willie Clark may refer to:

- Willie Clark (American football) (born 1972), American football player
- Willie Clark (baseball) (1872–1932), 19th century baseball player
- Willie Clark (footballer, born 1918) (1918–2008), Scottish football (soccer) player (Hibernian, St. Johnstone)
- Willie Clark (footballer, born 1932) (1932–2006), Scottish football (soccer) player (QPR)
- Willie Clark (ice hockey) (born 1931), British ice hockey player
- Willie Clarke (songwriter), co-founder of Miami's first Black-owned record label

== See also ==
- William Clark (disambiguation)
- Willie Clarke (disambiguation)
