= Boston Board of Selectmen =

17th- and 18th-century governing board

Boston Board of Selectman
- Type: Directorial Chief executive
- Status: Dissolved
- Appointer: Open town meeting Styled: "Freeholders and other Inhabitants of the Town of Boston"
- Term length: 1 year (6 mo. initially)
- Formation: July 1, 1634
- First holder: John Winthrop; William Coddington; John Underhill; Thomas Oliver; Thomas Leverett; Giles Firmin; John Coggeshall; William Pierce; Robert Harding; William Brenton; Richard Bellingham
- Final holder: Daniel Baxter; Samuel Billings; Abram Babcock; Jonathan Loring; Eliphalet Williams; Robert Fennelly; Jeremiah Fitch; Samuel A. Wells; David W. Child
- Abolished: March 4, 1822
- Superseded by: Mayor; Boston City Council

The Boston Board of Selectmen was the governing board for the town of Boston from the 17th century until 1822. Selectmen were elected to six-month terms early in the history of the board, but later were elected to one-year terms.

In colonial days selectmen included William Clark. At the time of the American Revolution, the selectmen were John Hancock, Joseph Jackson, Samuel Sewall, William Phillips, Timothy Newell, John Ruddock (Selectman), John Rowe and Samuel Pemberton.

== Notable selectmen ==
Name	Lifespan	Years of service	
Samuel Adams, Sr.	1689–1748	1731, 1732, 1743–46	
Thomas Hutchinson	1711–1780	1737	
John Hancock	1737–1793	1765–1774	
John Rowe	1715–1787	March 13, 1767 – 1769	
Charles Bulfinch	1763–1844	1791-1817	1800-1815 President of Board

== 17th century ==
=== 1630s ===
- 1634: John Winthrop, William Coddington, John Underhill, Thomas Oliver, Thomas Leverett, Giles Firmin, John Coggeshall, William Pierce, Robert Harding, William Brenton, Richard Bellingham, John Coggan.
- 1636: Thomas Oliver, Thomas Leverett, John Coggeshall, William Brenton, William Hutchinson, William Colburn, John Sanford, Richard Tuttell, William Aspinwall, William Balston, Jacob Eliot, James Penn, Robert Keayne, John Newgate.
- 1637: Thomas Oliver, Thomas Leverett, John Coggeshall, Robert Harding, William Brenton, William Hutchinson, William Colburn, John Sanford, William Aspinwall, William Balston, Jacob Eliot, James Penn.
- 1638: Thomas Oliver, Thomas Leverett, Robert Harding, William Colburn, John Sanford, William Aspinwall, William Balston, Jacob Eliot, James Penn, Robert Keayne, John Newgate.
- 1639: John Winthrop, Thomas Oliver, Thomas Leverett, Robert Harding, Richard Bellingham, John Coggan, William Colburn, Jacob Eliot, Robert Keayne, John Newgate, Edward Gibbons, William Tyng, William Hibbens.

=== 1640s ===
- 1640: Richard Bellingham, John Winthrop, William Tyng, Edward Gibbons, William Colburn, Jacob Eliot, John Newgate, William Hibbens, Atherton Hough.
- 1641: Richard Bellingham, John Winthrop, William Tyng, Edward Gibbons, William Colburn, Jacob Eliot, William Hibbens, James Penn, John Oliver.
- 1642: Richard Bellingham, John Winthrop, William Tyng, Edward Gibbons, William Colburn, Jacob Eliot, James Penn, John Oliver, Valentine Hill.
- 1643: Richard Bellingham, John Winthrop, William Tyng, Edward Gibbons, William Colburn, Jacob Eliot, William Hibbens, John Oliver, Valentine Hill.
- 1644: John Winthrop, William Tyng, Edward Gibbons, William Colburn, Jacob Eliot, William Hibbens, James Penn, John Oliver, Valentine Hill.
- 1645: John Winthrop, Edward Gibbons, William Colburn, Jacob Eliot, William Hibbens, James Penn, John Oliver, Valentine Hill, Edward Tyng, Robert Keayne, Thomas Fowle.
- 1646: John Winthrop, Edward Gibbons, William Colburn, Jacob Eliot, William Hibbens, James Penn, Valentine Hill, Robert Keayne.
- 1647: William Colburn, Jacob Eliot, James Penn, Anthony Stoddard, Thomas Marshall, James Everill, William Davis.
- 1648: William Colburn, Jacob Eliot, James Penn, Anthony Stoddard, Thomas Marshall, James Everill, Edward Tyng.
- 1649: William Colburn, Jacob Eliot, James Penn, Anthony Stoddard, Thomas Marshall, James Everill, Jeremy Houchin.

=== 1650s ===
- 1650: William Colburn, Jacob Eliot, James Penn, Anthony Stoddard, Thomas Marshall, Jeremy Houchin, Thomas Clarke.
- 1651: Anthony Stoddard, Thomas Marshall, Edward Tyng, Jeremy Houchin, Thomas Clarke, Richard Parker, John Leverett.
- 1652: Thomas Marshall, Jeremy Houchin, Thomas Clarke, Adam Winthrop, Thomas Savage, Edward Hutchinson, William Brenton.
- 1653: Thomas Marshall, Jeremy Houchin, Edward Hutchinson, William Brenton, James Oliver, Samuel Cole, Peter Oliver.
- 1654: Thomas Marshall, William Davis, Jeremy Houchin, William Brenton, James Oliver, Samuel Cole, Peter Oliver.
- 1655: Thomas Marshall, William Davis, William Brenton, James Oliver, Samuel Cole, Peter Oliver, William Paddy.
- 1656: Thomas Marshall, William Davis, William Brenton, James Oliver, Samuel Cole, Peter Oliver, William Paddy.
- 1657: Thomas Marshall, William Brenton, William Paddy, Samuel Cole, William Davis, Joshua Scottow, John Hull.
- 1658: William Paddy, William Davis, Joshua Scottow, John Hull, Thomas Broughton, Thomas Lake, Jacob Sheaffe.
- 1659: William Davis, Joshua Scottow, John Hull, Thomas Broughton, Thomas Lake, Jacob Sheaffe, Hezekiah Usher.

=== 1660s ===
- 1660: William Davis, Joshua Scottow, John Hull, Thomas Broughton, Thomas Lake, Hezekiah Usher, Nathaniel Williams.
- 1661: William Davis, Joshua Scottow, John Hull, Thomas Lake, Hezekiah Usher, Nathaniel Williams, Peter Oliver.
- 1662: Joshua Scottow, Thomas Lake, Hezekiah Usher, Peter Oliver, James Oliver, Edward Rainsford, John Joyliffe.
- 1663: Joshua Scottow, John Hull, Thomas Lake, Hezekiah Usher, Peter Oliver, James Oliver, Edward Rainsford.
- 1664: Joshua Scottow, John Hull, Thomas Lake, Hezekiah Usher, Peter Oliver, James Oliver, Edward Rainsford.
- 1665: Joshua Scottow, John Hull, Thomas Lake, Hezekiah Usher, Peter Oliver, James Oliver, Edward Rainsford.
- 1666: Joshua Scottow, John Hull, Thomas Lake, Hezekiah Usher, Peter Oliver, James Oliver, Edward Rainsford.
- 1667: Thomas Lake, James Oliver, Peter Oliver, Joshua Scottow, John Hull, Edward Rainsford, Hezekiah Usher.
- 1668: Thomas Lake, James Oliver, Peter Oliver, Edward Rainsford, Hezekiah Usher, John Joyliffe, John Richards.
- 1669: Thomas Lake, James Oliver, Peter Oliver, Edward Rainsford, Hezekiah Usher, John Joyliffe, John Richards.

=== 1670s ===
- 1670: Thomas Lake, James Oliver, Peter Oliver, Hezekiah Usher, John Joyliffe, John Richards, William Davis.
- 1671: Thomas Lake, James Oliver, Hezekiah Usher, John Joyliffe, John Richards, William Davis, Thomas Brattle.
- 1672: Thomas Lake, James Oliver, Hezekiah Usher, John Joyliffe, John Richards, William Davis, Thomas Brattle.
- 1673: Thomas Lake, James Oliver, Hezekiah Usher, John Joyliffe, John Richards, William Davis, Thomas Brattle.
- 1674: Thomas Lake, James Oliver, Hezekiah Usher, John Joyliffe, William Davis, Thomas Brattle, John Lake.
- 1675: Thomas Lake, James Oliver, Hezekiah Usher, John Joyliffe, William Davis, Thomas Brattle, John Lake.
- 1676: Thomas Brattle, John Lake, Thomas Lake, Hezekiah Usher, John Joyliffe, Daniel Turell, James Oliver.
- 1677: Thomas Brattle, John Lake, John Joyliffe, Daniel Turell, James Oliver, Henry Allen, Jacob Eliot.
- 1678: Thomas Brattle, John Joyliffe, Daniel Turell, James Oliver, Henry Allen, John Fairweather, Elisha Hutchinson.
- 1679: Thomas Brattle, John Joyliffe, Daniel Turell, Henry Allen, John Fairweather, Elisha Hutchinson, Theophilus Frary.

=== 1680s ===
- 1680: Thomas Brattle, John Joyliffe, Daniel Turell, Henry Allen, John Fairweather, Elisha Hutchinson, Theophilus Frary.
- 1681: Thomas Brattle, John Joyliffe, Daniel Turell, Henry Allen, Theophilus Frary, Nathaniel Greenwood, John Marion Sr.
- 1682: Thomas Brattle, John Joyliffe, Daniel Turell, Henry Allen, Elisha Hutchinson, Theophilus Frary, Nathaniel Greenwood.
- 1683: Thomas Brattle, John Joyliffe, Daniel Turell, Henry Allen, Elisha Hutchinson, Theophilus Frary, Nathaniel Greenwood.
- 1684: John Joyliffe, Daniel Turell, Henry Allen, John Fairweather, Elisha Hutchinson, Theophilus Frary, Nathaniel Greenwood, Timothy Prout, Edward Willis.
- 1685: John Joyliffe, Daniel Turell, Henry Allen, John Fairweather, Elisha Hutchinson, Theophilus Frary, Timothy Prout, Edward Willis, Elisha Cooke.
- 1686: John Joyliffe, Daniel Turell, Henry Allen, John Fairweather, Elisha Hutchinson, Theophilus Frary, Timothy Prout, Edward Willis, Elisha Cooke.
- 1687: John Joyliffe, Daniel Turell, Henry Allen, John Fairweather, Elisha Hutchinson, Theophilus Frary, Timothy Prout, Edward Willis, Elisha Cooke.
- 1688: Daniel Turell, John Fairweather, Timothy Prout, Edward Willis, Penn Townsend, James Hill, Isaac Addington, Adam Winthrop.
- 1689: John Joyliffe, Daniel Turell, Theophilus Frary, Timothy Prout, Edward Willis, Penn Townsend, James Hill, Adam Winthrop, Richard Middlecott.

=== 1690s ===
- 1690: John Joyliffe, Daniel Turell, Timothy Prout, Penn Townsend, James Hill, Adam Winthrop, Richard Middlecott, Thomas Walker, John Foster.
- 1691: John Joyliffe, Timothy Prout, Penn Townsend, Thomas Walker, John Foster, Bozoun Allen, Obadiah Gill, Jeremiah Dummer, John Marion Sr.
- 1692: Timothy Prout, Penn Townsend, Thomas Walker, John Foster, Bozoun Allen, Obadiah Gill, Jeremiah Dummer, John Marion Sr., Joseph Bridgham.
- 1693: James Hill, Thomas Walker, Bozoun Allen, Obadiah Gill, John Marion Sr., Samuel Checkley, Timothy Thornton, Ephraim Savage, Nathaniel Williams.
- 1694: Thomas Walker, Bozoun Allen, Obadiah Gill, John Marion Sr., Samuel Checkley, Timothy Thornton, Ephraim Savage, John Eyre, Edward Bromfield.
- 1695: Thomas Walker, Bozoun Allen, Obadiah Gill, John Marion Sr., Samuel Checkley, Ephraim Savage, John Eyre, Edward Bromfield, Samuel Legg.
- 1696: Thomas Walker, Bozoun Allen, Obadiah Gill, John Marion Sr., Ephraim Savage, Samuel Checkley, Samuel Legg, Samson Stoddard, Thomas Hunt.
- 1697: Thomas Walker, Bozoun Allen, Obadiah Gill, John Marion Sr., Samuel Checkley, Thomas Hunt, Isaiah Tay, James Barnes, John Marion Jr.
- 1698: Thomas Walker, Bozoun Allen, Obadiah Gill, Samson Stoddard, Thomas Hunt, Isaiah Tay, James Barnes, John Marion Jr., Simeon Stoddard.
- 1699: Obadiah Gill, Isaiah Tay, James Barnes, John Marion Jr., Joseph Prout, Daniel Oliver, Elizur Holyoke, Samuel Lynde, Timothy Clark.

== 18th century ==
=== 1700s ===
- 1700: James Barnes, John Marion Jr., Joseph Prout, Daniel Oliver, Elizur Holyoke, Timothy Clark, Robert Gibbs.
- 1701: James Barnes, John Marion Jr., Joseph Prout, Timothy Clark, Robert Gibbs, John Barnard, John George, Giles Dyer, Richard Draper.
- 1702: John Marion Jr., Joseph Prout, Timothy Clark, Robert Gibbs, John Barnard, Giles Dyer, Richard Draper, Robert Howard, Thomas Savage.
- 1703: John Marion Jr., Joseph Prout, Daniel Oliver, Timothy Clark, John Barnard, Giles Dyer, Robert Howard, Thomas Savage, Thomas Fitch.
- 1704: John Marion Jr., Joseph Prout, Daniel Oliver, Timothy Clark, John Barnard, Giles Dyer, Robert Howard, Thomas Fitch, Thomas Jackson.
- 1705: Joseph Prout, Daniel Oliver, Timothy Clark, John Barnard, Thomas Fitch, Thomas Jackson, Thomas Cushing, Elias Heath, Daniel Powning.
- 1706: Daniel Powning, Joseph Prout, John Barnard, Thomas Cushing, Thomas Jackson, Elias Heath, Thomas Hutchinson, James Barnes, Timothy Clark.
- 1707: Daniel Powning, Joseph Prout, Thomas Cushing, Thomas Hutchinson, Timothy Clark, Stephen Minot, Abraham Blith, Daniel Oliver, Francis Thresher.
- 1708: Daniel Powning, Joseph Prout, Thomas Cushing, Stephen Minot, Daniel Oliver, Francis Thresher, Oliver Noyes.
- 1709: Daniel Powning, James Barnes, Timothy Clark, Isaiah Tay, Jonas Clark, Samuel Marshall, Richard Draper, Ephraim Savage, Joseph Wadsworth.

=== 1710s ===
- 1710: Daniel Powning, James Barnes, Timothy Clark, Isaiah Tay, Jonas Clark, Samuel Marshall, Ephraim Savage, Joseph Wadsworth, Edwin Martyn.
- 1711: Isaiah Tay, Daniel Oliver, Thomas Cushing, Oliver Noyes, Joseph Wadsworth, Edward Hutchinson, Addington Davenport.
- 1712: Isaiah Tay, Daniel Oliver, Joseph Wadsworth, Edward Hutchinson, Francis Clark, Paul Dudley, Thomas Savage.
- 1713: Joseph Wadsworth, Edward Hutchinson, Francis Clark, John George, John Ruck, John Colman, William Payne.
- 1714: Joseph Wadsworth, Edward Hutchinson, John Ruck, John Marion Jr., William Welsteed, Grove Hirst, Edward Winslow.
- 1715: Joseph Wadsworth, John Marion Jr., William Welsteed, Habijah Savage, Samuel Greenwood, John Charnock, John Baker.
- 1716: Joseph Wadsworth, John Marion Jr., William Welsteed, Habijah Savage, Samuel Greenwood, John Charnock, John Baker.
- 1717: Joseph Wadsworth, John Marion Jr., William Welsteed, Habijah Savage, Samuel Greenwood, John Charnock, John Baker.
- 1718: Joseph Wadsworth, John Marion Jr., William Welsteed, Habijah Savage, Samuel Greenwood, John Charnock, John Baker.
- 1719: Isaiah Tay, Thomas Cushing, Oliver Noyes, John Marion Jr., Elisha Cooke, William Clark, Ebenezer Clough.

=== 1720s ===
- 1720: Isaiah Tay, Thomas Cushing, Oliver Noyes, John Marion Jr., Elisha Cooke, William Clark, Ebenezer Clough.
- 1721: Elisha Cooke, John Marion Jr., William Clark, Thomas Cushing, Ebenezer Clough, William Hutchinson, Nathaniel Green.
- 1722: Elisha Cooke, John Marion Jr., William Clark, Thomas Cushing, Ebenezer Clough, Nathaniel Green, Isaiah Tay.
- 1723: Elisha Cooke, John Marion Jr., Ebenezer Clough, Nathaniel Green, Isaiah Tay, Stephen Minot, Ezekiel Lewis.
- 1724: John Marion Jr., Thomas Cushing, Nathaniel Green, Isaiah Tay, Stephen Minot, Ezekiel Lewis, Henry Deering.
- 1725: John Marion Jr., Thomas Cushing, Nathaniel Green, Isaiah Tay, Stephen Minot, Ezekiel Lewis, Henry Deering.
- 1726: Thomas Cushing, Nathaniel Green, Ezekiel Lewis, Henry Deering, John Baker, Jonathan Waldo, Timothy Prout.
- 1727: John Baker, Jonathan Waldo, Timothy Prout, Oxinbridge Thatcher, John Hunt, David Farnum, Jonathan Williams.
- 1728: John Baker, Jonathan Waldo, Timothy Prout, Oxinbridge Thatcher, John Hunt, David Farnum, Jonathan Williams.
- 1729: Timothy Prout, Oxinbridge Thatcher, John Hunt, David Farnum, Jonathan Williams, Samuel Adams, Jonathan Loring.

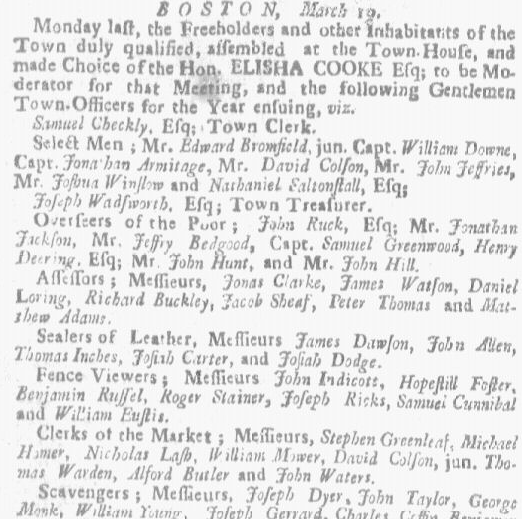
Newspaper item related to the Boston Select Men, 1733

=== 1730s ===
- 1730: Samuel Adams, Jonathan Loring, Samuel White, Joshua Cheever, Andrew Tyler, Benjamin Fitch, John Osborn.
- 1731: Jonathan Loring, Samuel Adams, Samuel White, Joshua Cheever, Andrew Tyler, John Osborn, Benjamin Fitch.
- 1732: Samuel Adams, Samuel White, Joshua Cheever, Andrew Tyler, Benjamin Fitch, Edward Bromfield Jr., William Downe.
- 1733: Edward Bromfield Jr., William Downe, Jonathan Armitage, David Colson, John Jeffries, Joshua Winslow, Nathaniel Saltonstall.
- 1734: Edward Bromfield Jr., William Downe, Jonathan Armitage, David Colson, John Jeffries, Joshua Winslow, Alexander Forsyth.
- 1735: Edward Bromfield Jr., William Downe, Jonathan Armitage, David Colson, John Jeffries, Joshua Winslow, Alexander Forsyth.
- 1736: Jonathan Armitage, David Colson, John Jeffries, Alexander Forsyth, John Eastwick, Caleb Lyman, Jonas Clarke.
- 1737: Jonathan Armitage, David Colson, John Jeffries, Alexander Forsyth, Caleb Lyman, Jonas Clarke, Thomas Hutchinson Jr.
- 1738: Jonathan Armitage, David Colson, John Jeffries, Alexander Forsyth, Caleb Lyman, Jonas Clarke, Thomas Hutchinson Jr.
- 1739: Jonathan Armitage, David Colson, John Jeffries, Alexander Forsyth, Caleb Lyman, Jonas Clarke, Thomas Hutchinson Jr.

=== 1740s ===
- 1740: John Jeffries, Alexander Forsyth, Caleb Lyman, Jonas Clarke, Thomas Hutchinson Jr., Thomas Hancock, Middlecott Cooke.
- 1741: John Jeffries, Alexander Forsyth, Caleb Lyman, Jonas Clarke, Thomas Hancock, Middlecott Cooke, John Steel.
- 1742: John Jeffries, Alexander Forsyth, Caleb Lyman, Jonas Clarke, Thomas Hancock, Middlecott Cooke, John Steel.
- 1743: John Jeffries, Alexander Forsyth, Jonas Clarke, Thomas Hancock, Middlecott Cooke, John Steel, Thomas Hutchinson Jr.
- 1744: Jonas Clarke, Thomas Hancock, Middlecott Cooke, John Steel, Thomas Hutchinson Jr., Samuel Adams, William Salter.
- 1745: Jonas Clarke, Thomas Hancock, Middlecott Cooke, John Steel, Thomas Hutchinson Jr., Samuel Adams, William Salter, Henry Atkins.
- 1746: Jonas Clarke, Thomas Hancock, John Steel, Samuel Adams, William Salter, Henry Atkins, Abiel Walley.
- 1747: John Steel, Samuel Adams, William Salter, Abiel Walley, John Tyng, Jeremiah Belknap, Samuel Grant.
- 1748: Thomas Hancock, Middlecott Cooke, John Steel, William Salter, John Tyng, Samuel Grant, Thomas Hill.
- 1749: Thomas Hancock, Middlecott Cooke, John Steel, William Salter, Samuel Grant, Thomas Hill, John Gardner.

=== 1750s ===
- 1750: Thomas Hancock, Middlecott Cooke, John Steel, William Salter, Samuel Grant, Thomas Hill, John Gardner.
- 1751: Thomas Hancock, John Steel, Samuel Grant, Thomas Hill, John Gardner, Joshua Henshaw, George Holmes.
- 1752: Thomas Hancock, John Steel, Samuel Grant, Thomas Hill, Joshua Henshaw, George Holmes, Joseph Jackson.
- 1753: John Steel, Samuel Grant, Thomas Hill, Joshua Henshaw, Joseph Jackson, Thomas Cushing, Samuel Hewes.
- 1754: Samuel Grant, Thomas Hill, Joshua Henshaw, Thomas Cushing, Joseph Jackson, Samuel Hewes, John Scollay.
- 1755: Samuel Grant, Thomas Hill, Joshua Henshaw, Thomas Cushing, Joseph Jackson, Samuel Hewes, John Scollay.
- 1756: Samuel Grant, Thomas Hill, Joshua Henshaw, Thomas Cushing, Joseph Jackson, Samuel Hewes, John Scollay.
- 1757: Samuel Grant, Thomas Hill, Joshua Henshaw, Thomas Cushing, Joseph Jackson, Samuel Hewes, John Scollay.
- 1758: Joshua Henshaw, Thomas Cushing, Joseph Jackson, Samuel Hewes, John Scollay, Andrew Oliver Jr., Benjamin Austin.
- 1759: Joshua Henshaw, Thomas Cushing, Joseph Jackson, Samuel Hewes, John Scollay, Andrew Oliver Jr., Benjamin Austin.

=== 1760s ===
- 1760: Joshua Henshaw, Thomas Cushing, Joseph Jackson, Samuel Hewes, John Scollay, Andrew Oliver Jr., Benjamin Austin.
- 1761: Thomas Cushing, Samuel Hewes, John Scollay, Benjamin Austin, Samuel Sewall, Samuel Phillips Savage, Ezekiel Lewis.
- 1762: Thomas Cushing, Samuel Hewes, John Scollay, Benjamin Austin, Samuel Sewall, Samuel Phillips Savage, Ezekiel Lewis.
- 1763: Thomas Cushing, Samuel Hewes, John Scollay, Benjamin Austin, Samuel Sewall, Ezekiel Lewis, Nathaniel Thwing.
- 1764: Joshua Henshaw, Joseph Jackson, John Scollay, Benjamin Austin, Samuel Sewall, Nathaniel Thwing, John Ruddock.
- 1765: Joshua Henshaw, Joseph Jackson, Benjamin Austin, Samuel Sewall, Nathaniel Thwing, John Ruddock.
- 1766: Joseph Jackson, Samuel Sewall, John Ruddock, John Hancock, William Phillips, Timothy Newell, John Rowe.
- 1767: Joseph Jackson, Samuel Sewall, John Ruddock, John Hancock, William Phillips, Timothy Newell, John Rowe.
- 1768: Joshua Henshaw, Joseph Jackson, John Ruddock, John Hancock, John Rowe, Samuel Pemberton, Henderson Inches.
- 1769: Joshua Henshaw, Joseph Jackson, John Ruddock, John Hancock, Samuel Pemberton, Henderson Inches, Jonathan Mason.

=== 1770s ===
- 1770: Joshua Henshaw, Joseph Jackson, John Ruddock, John Hancock, Samuel Pemberton, Henderson Inches, Jonathan Mason.
- 1771: Joseph Jackson, John Ruddock, John Hancock, Samuel Pemberton, Henderson Inches, Jonathan Mason, Ebenezer Storer.
- 1772: John Scollay, John Ruddock, John Hancock, Timothy Newell, Thomas Marshall, Oliver Wendell, Samuel Austin.
- 1773: John Scollay, John Hancock, Timothy Newell, Thomas Marshall, Oliver Wendell, Samuel Austin, John Pitts.
- 1774: John Scollay, John Hancock, Timothy Newell, Thomas Marshall, Samuel Austin, Oliver Wendell, John Pitts.
- 1775: John Scollay, John Hancock, Timothy Newell, Thomas Marshall, Samuel Austin, Oliver Wendell, John Pitts.
- 1776: John Scollay, Samuel Austin, Oliver Wendell, John Pitts, Ebenezer Storer, Nathaniel Appleton, John Greenleaf, Henry Bromfield.
- 1777: John Scollay, Samuel Austin, Oliver Wendell, John Pitts, Gustavus Fellows, Harbottle Dorr, Thomas Greenough, Jonathan Williams, John Preston.
- 1778: John Scollay, Samuel Austin, Gustavus Fellows, Harbottle Dorr, Thomas Greenough, Jonathan Williams, John Preston, Nathan Frazier, Ezekiel Price.
- 1779: John Scollay, Samuel Austin, Gustavus Fellows, Harbottle Dorr, Thomas Greenough, Jonathan Williams, John Preston, Nathan Frazier, Ezekiel Price.

=== 1780s ===
- 1780: John Scollay, Gustavus Fellows, Harbottle Dorr, Nathan Frazier, Ezekiel Price, William Mackey, Tuttle Hubbard.
- 1781: John Scollay, Gustavus Fellows, Harbottle Dorr, Nathan Frazier, Ezekiel Price, William Mackey, Tuttle Hubbard.
- 1782: John Scollay, Gustavus Fellows, Harbottle Dorr, Nathan Frazier, Ezekiel Price, William Mackey, Tuttle Hubbard.
- 1783: John Scollay, Harbottle Dorr, Thomas Greenough, Ezekiel Price, William Mackey, Tuttle Hubbard, David Jeffries.
- 1784: John Scollay, Thomas Greenough, Nathan Frazier, Ezekiel Price, William Mackey, David Jeffries, John Lucas.
- 1785: John Scollay, Ezekiel Price, William Mackey, John Brown, Edward Tyler, John Andrews, William Browne, Moses Grant, William Cunningham.
- 1786: John Scollay, Harbottle Dorr, Ezekiel Price, John Brown, Edward Tyler, John Andrews, Moses Grant, William Cunningham, Thomas Walley.
- 1787: John Scollay, Harbottle Dorr, Ezekiel Price, John Brown, Edward Tyler, John Andrews, Thomas Walley, William Boardman, Ebenezer Sever.
- 1788: John Scollay, Harbottle Dorr, Ezekiel Price, John Brown, Edward Tyler, John Andrews, Thomas Walley, William Boardman, Ebenezer Sever.
- 1789: John Scollay, Harbottle Dorr, Ezekiel Price, Edward Tyler, John Andrews, Thomas Walley, William Boardman, Ebenezer Sever, Jabez Hatch.

=== 1790s ===
- 1790: John Scollay, Harbottle Dorr, Ezekiel Price, Thomas Walley, William Boardman, Ebenezer Sever, Jabez Hatch, Thomas Crafts, Thomas Edwards.
- 1791: Ezekiel Price, Thomas Walley, William Boardman, Ebenezer Sever, Thomas Crafts, Thomas Edwards, William Little, Samuel Cabot, Charles Bulfinch.
- 1792: Ezekiel Price, Thomas Walley, William Boardman, Ebenezer Sever, Thomas Crafts, Thomas Edwards, William Little, Charles Bulfinch, William Scollay.
- 1793: Ezekiel Price, Thomas Walley, William Boardman, Ebenezer Sever, Thomas Crafts, Thomas Edwards, William Little, Charles Bulfinch, William Scollay.
- 1794: Ezekiel Price, Thomas Walley, William Boardman, Ebenezer Sever, Thomas Crafts, Thomas Edwards, William Little, Charles Bulfinch, William Scollay.
- 1795: Ezekiel Price, Thomas Walley, William Boardman, Ebenezer Sever, Thomas Crafts, Thomas Edwards, William Little, William Scollay, Jesse Putnam.
- 1796: Ezekiel Price, Thomas Walley, William Boardman, Ebenezer Sever, Thomas Crafts, Thomas Edwards, William Little, David Tilden, Russell Sturgis.
- 1797: Thomas Edwards, William Little, David Tilden, Russell Sturgis, Benjamin Austin, Ebenezer Hancock, Joseph Howard, Jonathan Harris, Ebenezer Sever.
- 1798: Thomas Edwards, William Little, David Tilden, Benjamin Austin, Ebenezer Hancock, Jonathan Harris, William Porter, William Sherburne, John Tilestone.
- 1799: David Tilden, Russell Sturgis, Ebenezer Hancock, Joseph Howard, William Porter, William Sherburne, John Tilestone, Charles Bulfinch, Samuel Cobb.

== 19th century ==
=== 1800s ===
- 1800: David Tilden, Russell Sturgis, Ebenezer Hancock, Joseph Howard, William Porter, William Sherburne, John Tilestone, Charles Bulfinch, Ebenezer Oliver.
- 1801: David Tilden, Russell Sturgis, Joseph Howard, William Porter, William Sherburne, John Tilestone, Charles Bulfinch, Ebenezer Oliver, Jonathan Hunnewell.
- 1802: David Tilden, Russell Sturgis, Joseph Howard, William Porter, William Sherburne, John Tilestone, Charles Bulfinch, Ebenezer Oliver, Jonathan Hunnewell.
- 1803: David Tilden, William Porter, John Tilestone, Charles Bulfinch, Ebenezer Oliver, Jonathan Hunnewell, John May, Francis Wright, Jonathan Chapman.
- 1804: David Tilden, William Porter, John Tilestone, Charles Bulfinch, Ebenezer Oliver, Jonathan Hunnewell, John May, Francis Wright, Jonathan Chapman.
- 1805: David Tilden, William Porter, John Tilestone, Charles Bulfinch, Ebenezer Oliver, Jonathan Hunnewell, John May, Francis Wright, Jonathan Chapman.
- 1806: David Tilden, William Porter, John Tilestone, Charles Bulfinch, Ebenezer Oliver, Jonathan Hunnewell, John May, Francis Wright, Joseph Kittle.
- 1807: Charles Bulfinch, David Tilden, William Porter, Ebenezer Oliver, Jonathan Hunnewell, John May, Francis Wright, Joseph Kittle, Jonathan Chapman.
- 1808: Charles Bulfinch, William Porter, Ebenezer Oliver, Jonathan Hunnewell, John May, Francis Wright, Jonathan Chapman, Nathan Webb, Joseph Foster.
- 1809: Charles Bulfinch, William Porter, Ebenezer Oliver, Jonathan Hunnewell, John May, Francis Wright, Nathan Webb, Joseph Foster, Benjamin Weld.

=== 1810s ===
- 1810: Charles Bulfinch, William Porter, Ebenezer Oliver, Jonathan Hunnewell, John May, Francis Wright, Nathan Webb, Joseph Foster, Benjamin Weld.
- 1811: Charles Bulfinch, William Porter, Ebenezer Oliver, Jonathan Hunnewell, John May, Francis Wright, Nathan Webb, Joseph Foster, Benjamin Weld.
- 1812: Charles Bulfinch, Ebenezer Oliver, Jonathan Hunnewell, John May, Francis Wright, Nathan Webb, Joseph Foster, Benjamin Weld, Joseph Austin, Robert Williams, Joseph Lovering.
- 1813: Charles Bulfinch, Ebenezer Oliver, Jonathan Hunnewell, Nathan Webb, Joseph Foster, Benjamin Weld, Joseph Austin, Robert Williams, Joseph Lovering.
- 1814: Charles Bulfinch, Ebenezer Oliver, Jonathan Hunnewell, Nathan Webb, Joseph Foster, Benjamin Weld, Joseph Austin, Robert Williams, Joseph Lovering.
- 1815: Charles Bulfinch, Ebenezer Oliver, Jonathan Hunnewell, Joseph Foster, Benjamin Weld, Joseph Austin, Robert Williams, Joseph Lovering, Edmund Hart.
- 1816: Charles Bulfinch, Ebenezer Oliver, Jonathan Hunnewell, Joseph Austin, Robert Williams, Joseph Lovering, George G. Lee, John Bray, Turner Phillips, John Howe.
- 1817: Charles Bulfinch, Ebenezer Oliver, Jonathan Hunnewell, Joseph Lovering, Joseph Austin, Turner Phillips, Henry Bass, Samuel Dorr, Enoch Silsby.
- 1818: Ebenezer Oliver, Jonathan Hunnewell, Joseph Lovering, Joseph Austin, Turner Phillips, Henry Bass, Samuel Dorr, Enoch Silsby, Henry Farnham.
- 1819: Ebenezer Oliver, Jonathan Hunnewell, Joseph Lovering, Joseph Austin, Turner Phillips, Henry Bass, Samuel Dorr, Enoch Silsby, Lemuel Shaw.

=== 1820s ===
- 1820: Daniel Baxter, Samuel Billings, Abram Babcock, Jonathan Loring, Eliphalet Williams, Robert Fennelly, Jeremiah Fitch, Samuel A. Wells, David W. Child, Benjamin Austin.
- 1821: Daniel Baxter, Samuel Billings, Abram Babcock, Jonathan Loring, Eliphalet Williams, Robert Fennelly, Jeremiah Fitch, Samuel A. Wells, David W. Child.

== See also ==
- Boston City Council
- Boston City Council (1822–1909)
- List of members of the Boston City Council
