= Clement Clerke =

British Baronet (died 1693)

Sir Clement Clerke, 1st Baronet (died 1693) was an important (but financially unsuccessful) English entrepreneur, whose greatest achievement was the application of the reverberatory furnace (cupola) to smelting lead and copper, and to remelting pig iron for foundry purposes.

== Background ==
Clement Clerke was the third son of George Clerke of Willoughby, Warwickshire, and was created a baronet shortly after the Restoration. He was married to Sarah, daughter and heiress of George Talbot of Rudge, Shropshire. In 1657, he bought the Launde Abbey estate in Leicestershire in 1658 and this was settled on him and his wife. They had another estate at Notgrove in Gloucestershire.

== Iron smelting ==
In the early 1670s, Sir Clement joined various other people in sponsoring Dud Dudley to build a furnace at Dudley to smelt iron using a mixed fuel made from wood and coal. This (uniquely) was to be powered by the strength of men and of horses. By 1674 Sir Clement and John Finch of Dudley were the only partners. Finch had other ironworks, but competition between him and Philip Foley was damaging to them both; this led them to enter into a restrictive agreement as to where they would respectively buy wood and generally limiting their activities. A few months later, John Finch sold all his works to Alderman John Foorth (of London) and Sir Clement Clerke. They also bought wood in the Forest of Dean, but found that the King's Ironworks there had been sold to Paul Foley for demolition and had to build their own furnace at Linton, Herefordshire. They then brought in further partners including John's brother Dannett Foorth and George Skippe of Ledbury. They also bought further ironworks from Philip Foley. This proved to be a troubled business because Sir Clement borrowed money from moneylenders on the security of his share (in breach of the terms of the partnership agreement). This led Dannett Foorth having him Sir Clement arrested for debt, and George Skippe bailing him out. These difficulties were resolved by the sale of the ironworks in 1676, and the dissolution of the partnership.

== The River Stour ==
During their partnership, Andrew Yarranton persuaded John Foorth and Sir Clement Clerke to finance the completion of the navigation of the Worcestershire Stour. This would have been a convenience for them, as it ran near some of their works, but nothing was done except pay off some debts, due to the problems with the ironworks business. On its dissolution, George Skippe took over Foorth's share in the navigation; new contractors (including Andrew Yarranton's son Robert, and they were to be paid by instalments as the works progressed, but the money ran out when the river was only completed from Stourbridge to Kidderminster.

== Lead smelting ==
By this stage, Sir Clement had exhausted his resources; the manor of Rudge was ultimately foreclosed by the mortgagee. Lord Grandison had financed a certain Samuel Hutchinson, who had a patent for smelting lead with pitcoal, but failed. Grandison then approached Sir Clement. Grandison and Robert Thorowgood (a King's Lynn merchant) provided the capital in 1678 for Sir Clement and Francis Nicholson (Grandison's dependent) to set up lead works. Sir Clement went to Bristol and built cupolas - reverberatory furnaces, but when Sir Clement went back for the rest of the capital, he found that Nicholson had taken it to Derbyshire and lost it.

In 1683, there was a complicated agreement to the effect that business should be carried on by Sir Clement's son Talbot, but he was not quite 21 years old so that the business had to be in the name of a trustee. The business was in fact profitable. Talbot sought to declare a dividend, but Lord Grandison and his fellow financier, Hon. Henry Howard demanded that they be repaid money that they said Sir Clement owed them. This led to litigation, during the course of which one Gravely Claypoole was appointed by the court to run the works for Grandison. The litigation was ultimately resolved in Talbot's favour.

Another venture related to the production of white lead. This was in the names of Talbot's trustee an Grandison's son Edward Fitzgerald Villiers, but was evidently not successful, with the result that money had to be obtained by mortgaging Launde Abbey to repay Villiers.

== Copper and company flotations ==
In 1687, while the lead cupola was out of their possession, Sir Clement and Talbot built a reverberatory furnace at Putney and smelted copper there. A patent was obtained for this in 1688. This led to the establishment of a copper smelting works close to the banks of the River Wye at Redbrook and the chartering of the English Copper Company.

With the conclusion of the litigation, the cupola near Bristol reverted to Talbot Clerke. The Company for Smelting down Lead with Pitcoal (later in different ownership known as the London Lead Company) was chartered to run this, but this was evidently not successful and returned to Talbot (by then Sir Talbot) in 1695.

'A work for remelting and casting old iron with sea coal' was built at 'Fox Hall' (probably Vauxhall under the direction of Sir Clement. This was the first reverberatory furnace (in this case known as an 'air furnace') to be built for iron foundry purposes. This seems to have formed the basis for the Company for Making Iron with Pitcoal, though it may also have been intended to exploit a patent granted to Thomas Addison in 1692. The company ran its foundry for a few years, with Thomas Fox (the brother of Shadrach Fox of Coalbrookdale) as founder.

== Impact ==
Sir Clement apparently guided many of these developments; though he probably did not personally benefit from them financially, his sons probably did. Sir Clement is certainly to be credited with the practical application of the reverberatory furnace (or cupola) to several metallurgical processes. Until the introduction in the late 18th century of the foundry cupola (which is a sort of small blast furnace), his air furnace was the normal way of remelting pig for foundry purposes. The cupola (reverberatory furnace) long remained in use for smelted copper and lead, and was applied by Robert Lyddall to tin.

It is not clear where he obtained his knowledge of metallurgy, but it is possible that Dud Dudley was his teacher; certainly, his lead smelting efforts seem to be foreshadowed by an enterprise involving Dud Dudley at Okham Slade (location unknown) in Clifton, Bristol. Sir Clement died in debt in 1693. His baronetcy passed to Talbot, as did Launde Abbey, which was not swallowed by his debts because of his marriage settlement.

Baronetage of England
New creation	Baronet (of Launde Abbey); 1661–1693	Succeeded by Talbot Clerke
