= Sir Francis Clerke, 7th Baronet =

British Army officer (1748-1777)

Francis Clerke
- Born: 24 October 1748; London, England, Great Britain
- Died: 15 October 1777 (aged 28); New York, United States
- Burial place: Albany, New York, United States
- Military career
- Allegiance: Great Britain
- Service years: 1770-1777
- Conflicts: American Revolutionary War Battle of Trois-Rivieres Battle of Bemis Heights †

Sir Francis Carr Clerke, 7th Baronet (24 October 1748 – 15 October 1777) was a British Army officer who was killed at the Battles of Saratoga.

== Biography ==
Francis Carr Clerke was born in Mayfair, London, England on 24 October 1748. He and his brother William Clerke were educated at John Roysse's Free School in Abingdon-on-Thames, (now Abingdon School).

On 12 February 1769, after his father Francis died, Clerke succeeded to his baronetcy. On 17 January 1766, he was admitted to the Inner Temple in London, where he stayed until the Hilary Term of 1769. Beginning in August 1769, he studied belles-lettres at Göttingen University. He was living back in London by August 1770.

On 3 January 1770, Clerke purchased the rank of ensign in the British Army (3rd Regiment of Foot Guards) and then purchased the rank of lieutenant on 26 July 1775. Clerke became the adjutant of the regiment on 3 February 1776 before General John Burgoyne appointed him aide-de-camp. He served with Burgoyne during the American War of Independence in the Battle of Trois-Rivières before returning to England with Burgoyne.

Clerke returned to North America in the Spring of 1777, he now also held the position of being Burgoyne's private secretary, which at the time was an influential position in the military command. During 1777, the British undertook the Saratoga campaign. On 7 October 1777 during the Battle of Bemis Heights, Clerke was mortally wounded after being shot (reportedly by Timothy Murphy, a soldier in the Morgan's Riflemen unit). He had been delivering Burgoyne's order to withdraw the artillery at the time. Clerke was captured by American soldiers and was taken to Horatio Gates' headquarters and placed on Gates' bed. Despite being cared for, he died of his wounds on 15 October.

He was buried by the headquarters but then reburied in the Church at Albany. His acts were acknowledged publicly in Parliament and it was said to have brought honour to the Clerke family name.

Baronetage of England
Preceded by Francis Clerke	Baronet (of Hitcham); 1769–1778	Succeeded by William Clerke

== See also ==
- List of Old Abingdonians
