= John Rowe (merchant) =

Merchant in Boston (1715–1787)

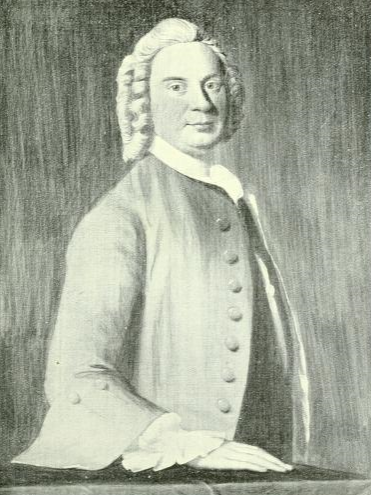

Member of the Boston Board of Selectmen
- In office March 13, 1767 – 1769

Member of the House of Representatives of the Province of Massachusetts Bay
- In office 1766–1766

Personal details
- Born: November 27, 1715 Exeter, Devon, England
- Died: February 17, 1787 (aged 71) Boston, Massachusetts, U.S.
- Spouse: Hannah Speakman

John Rowe (1715–1787) was a property developer and merchant in 18th century Boston, Massachusetts. As a merchant, John Rowe's cargo included the tea that was thrown overboard in the Boston Tea Party.

Rowes Wharf, a modern development in downtown Boston on the site of his original wharf, is named for him.

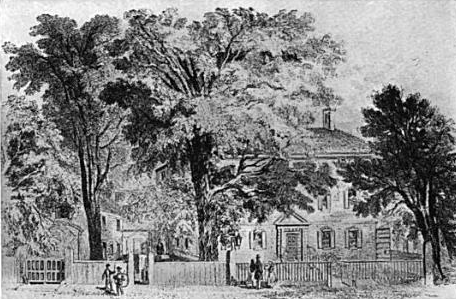
Rowe lived on Bedford Street, Boston, 1764-1787

== Biography ==
Coat of Arms of Rowe

Rowe was born in Exeter, in the English county of Devon, and immigrated to Boston with his brothers at an early age. He married Hannah Speakman in 1743 and lived in Boston for the rest of his life. His diaries are kept by the Massachusetts Historical Society and include many valuable observations about people, events, and daily life in Boston. He held various posts in Boston, including serving on the Boston Board of Selectmen.

Rowe was evidently a very active smuggler, avoiding British trade regulations by trading with forbidden ports. He was also an active slave dealer, shown by his advertisement in the 28 July 1746 edition of the Boston Evening Post. In the ad, Rowe listed goods for auction at his wharf, such as cocoa and rum. After the list of goods, he offered to purchase, "Some Negroes that can work at the Carpenter's Trade", and promised to "give a handsom[e] Price if he likes them." He joined protests against tightening restrictions of colonial trade, and helped incite the anti-Stamp Act riot in 1765 that destroyed Chief Justice Thomas Hutchinson's home.

Carl Becker mostly ignored John Rowe in The Eve of Revolution (1918), but he did include a letter written by Thomas Hutchinson. In the letter, Hutchinson claimed that Rowe, Otis and Molineux and Davies provoked the protesters who destroyed Hutchinson's house on 26 August 1765: "When there is occasion to burn or hang effigies or pull down houses, these [rabble] are employed; but since government has been brought to a system, they are somewhat controlled by a superior set consisting of the mastermasons, and carpenters, &c., of the town of Boston. When anything of more importance is to be determined, as opening the custom-house on any matter of trade, these are under the direction of a committee of the merchants, Mr. Rowe at their head, then Molyneaux, Solomon Davies, et&,…this is proper for a general meeting of the inhabitants of Boston, where Otis, with his mob-high of eloquence, prevails in every motion… and it would be a very extraordinary resolve indeed that is not carried into execution". During the era of the American Revolution, Rowe avoided commitment to either side, and instead looked out after his business interests.

Rowe was the owner of one of the tea ships, the Eleanor, involved in the Boston Tea Party. According to some accounts, at the Old South Meeting House before the Tea Party, he uttered the famous words, "perhaps salt water and tea will mix tonight," but according to his own journal, he was unwell and was not present during the meeting or the Tea Party. Because several sources placed Rowe at the meeting, it's possible to theorise that the journal entry may have been an attempt to conceal his participation in the events leading to the Tea Party.

== See also ==
- Little Bay Bridge, between Dover and Newington, New Hampshire, including a span officially named for Rowe

== Archives and records ==
- John Rowe letter book at Baker Library Special Collections, Harvard Business School.
