= William Clark (merchant) =

Colonial American merchant (1670–1742)

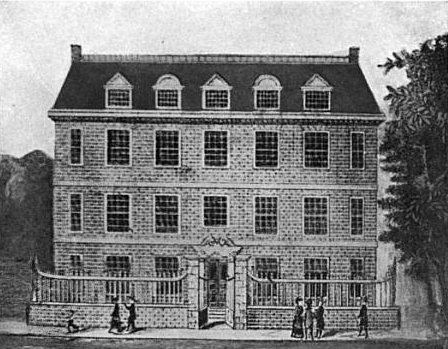
William Clark's house, Garden Court Street, North End, Boston, built ca.1713, demolished 1833

William Clark (December 19, 1670 - July, 1742) was a merchant and town official in Boston, Massachusetts in the late 17th and early 18th centuries. Around 1713 he built a large house at North Square in Boston's North End.

== Biography ==
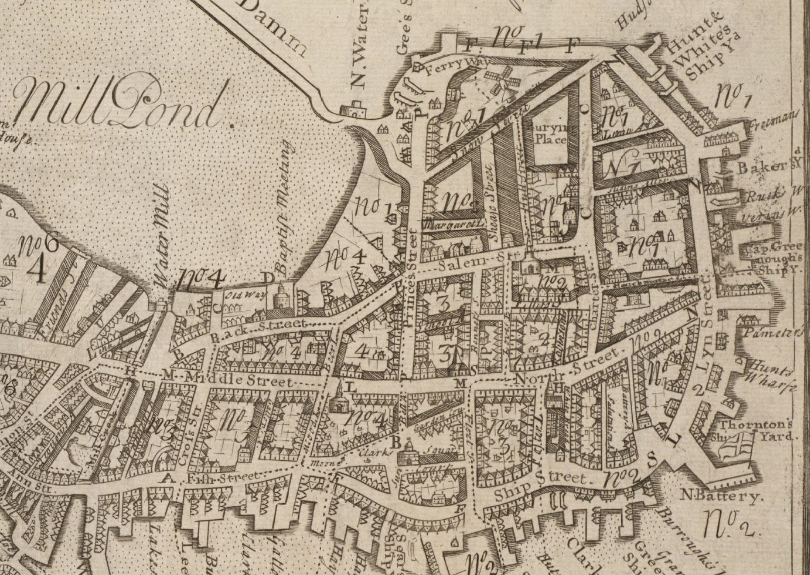
Detail of 1743 map of Boston, showing "Clark's Square" in the North End

Coat of Arms of William Clarke

Clark was born in Boston in 1670 to physician John Clark; siblings included future speaker of the House, John Clark. In 1702 he married Sarah Brondson; their children included Robert Clark and Benjamin Clark.

William Clark "held several minor town offices, as constable in 1700; overseer of the poor in 1704; ... tithing-man in 1713, 1715 and 1718; ... selectman of Boston from 1719 to 1723, and representative to the General Court, 1719-22, 1724 and 1725." He attended Old North Church (i.e. Second Church), and was a member of the Ancient and Honorable Artillery Company of Massachusetts.

"His death in 1742 [was] attributed by some to the loss of forty sail of vessels in the French wars." Clark was buried "in his tomb at Copp's Hill, marked by a tablet bearing the family arms.".
