= Robert D. McWethy =

Robert Devore McWethy
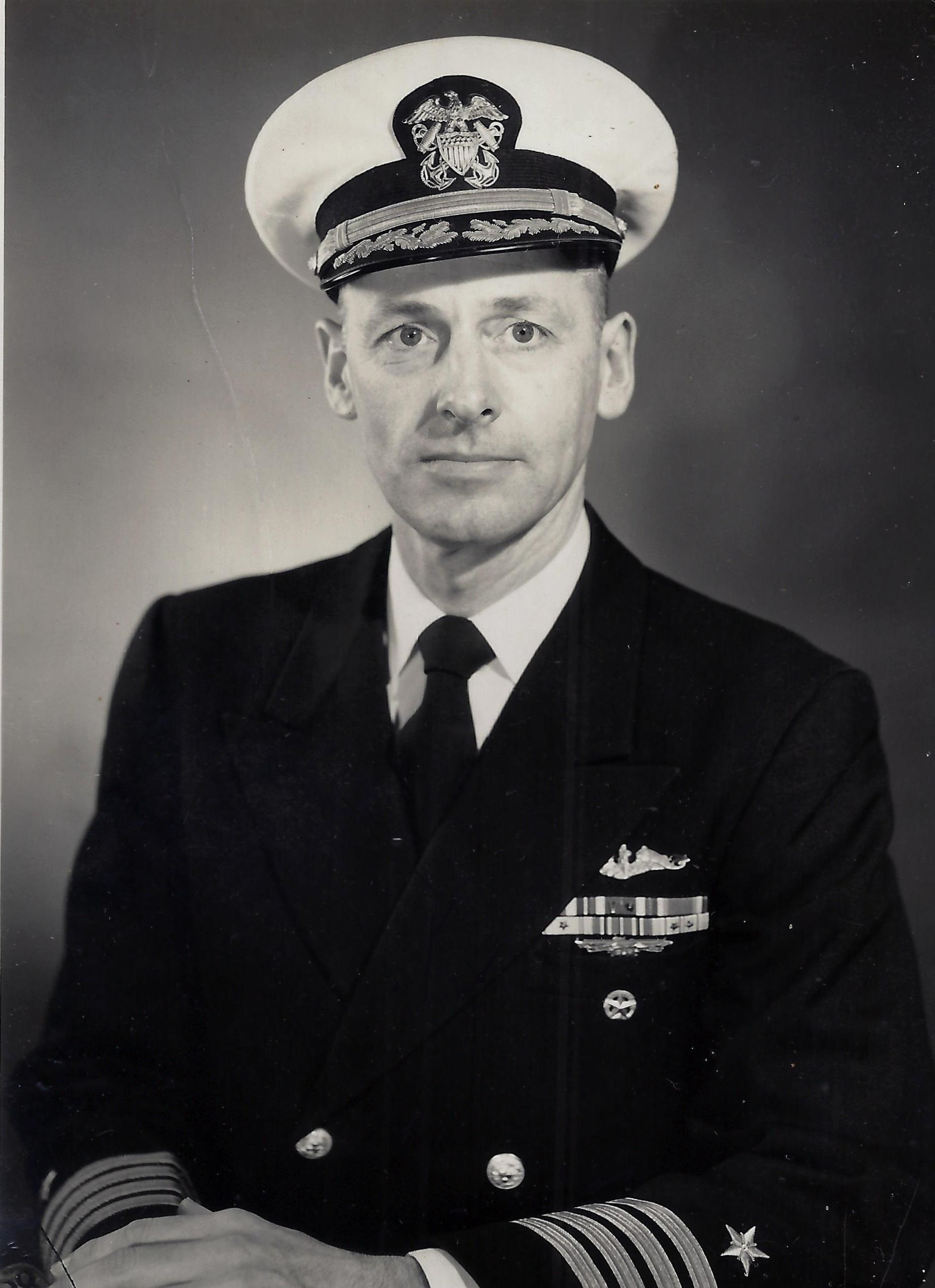
- Capt. Robert D. McWethy
- Nicknames: Bob, Mac
- Born: January 5, 1920; Aurora, Illinois
- Died: January 29, 2018 (aged 98)
- Allegiance: United States of America
- Branch: United States Navy
- Service years: 1938–1972
- Rank: Captain
- Service number: 0-123488/1100
- Conflicts: World War II; Korean War; Vietnam War
- Awards: Silver Star; Legion of Merit
- Spouse: Margaret Elizabeth McWethy
- Other work: US Naval Sailing Association

Robert Devore McWethy (January 5, 1920 – January 29, 2018) was a United States Navy captain and submariner who fought in the Pacific during World War II and later pioneered submarine navigation under the Arctic ice pack. Capt McWethy received the Legion of Merit for his role in the development of SOSUS underwater listening posts as commander of Oceanographic Systems Atlantic. From the 1970s on he was also active in support of sailing in the navy and at the U.S. Naval Academy.

== Early years ==
McWethy was born on January 5, 1920, the son of J. LeRoy and Zula Miller McWethy. In 1939, McWethy enrolled in the United States Naval Academy, where he was involved with sailing and golf, although the Lucky Bag yearbook noted that "his class standing is far nearer perfection than his golf swing."

== Career ==
=== World War II and service in submarines ===
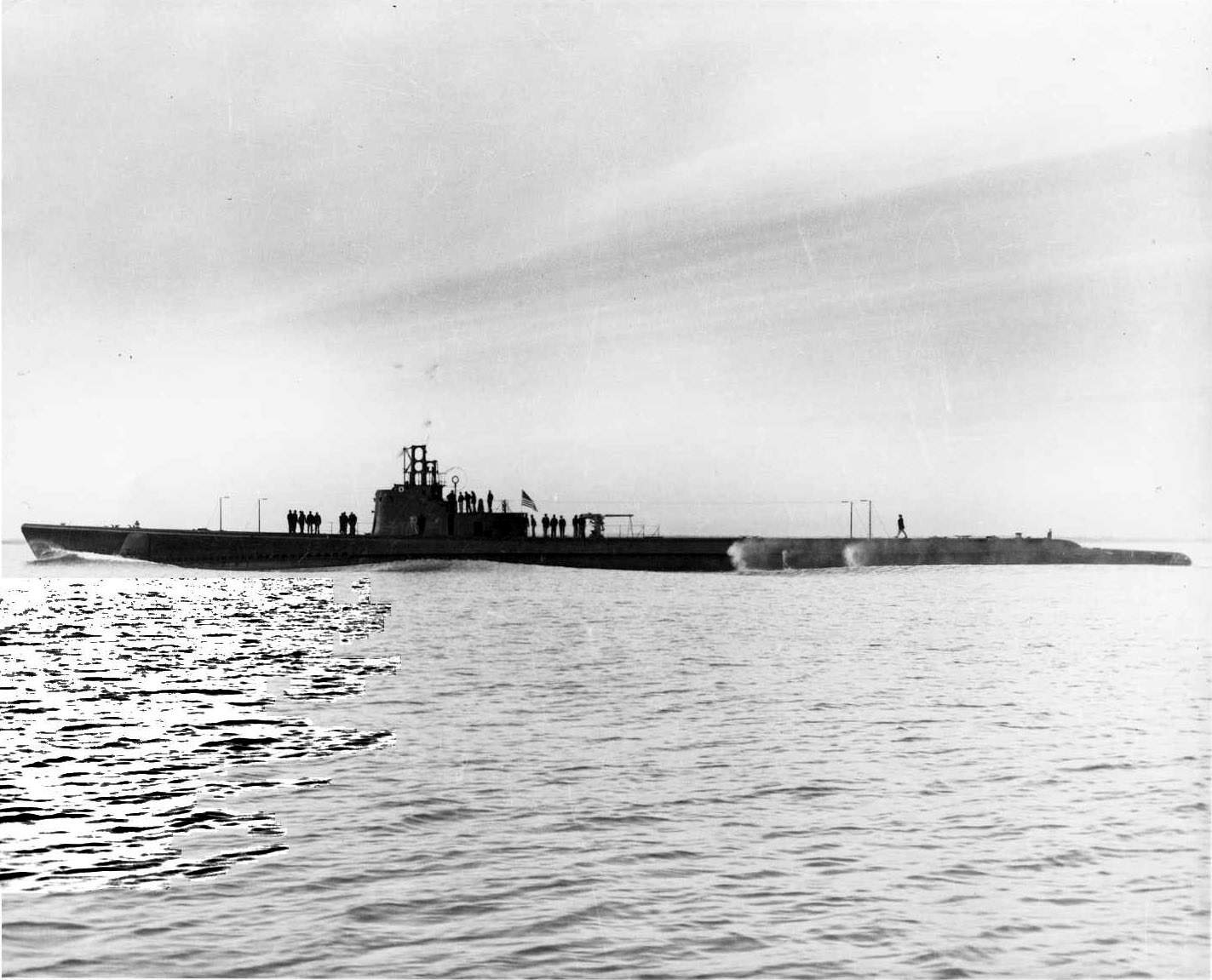
McWethy served as torpedo officer aboard the USS Pogy (SS-266) during World War II and was awarded the Silver Star for helping to sink 20,000 tons of enemy shipping. US Navy photo.

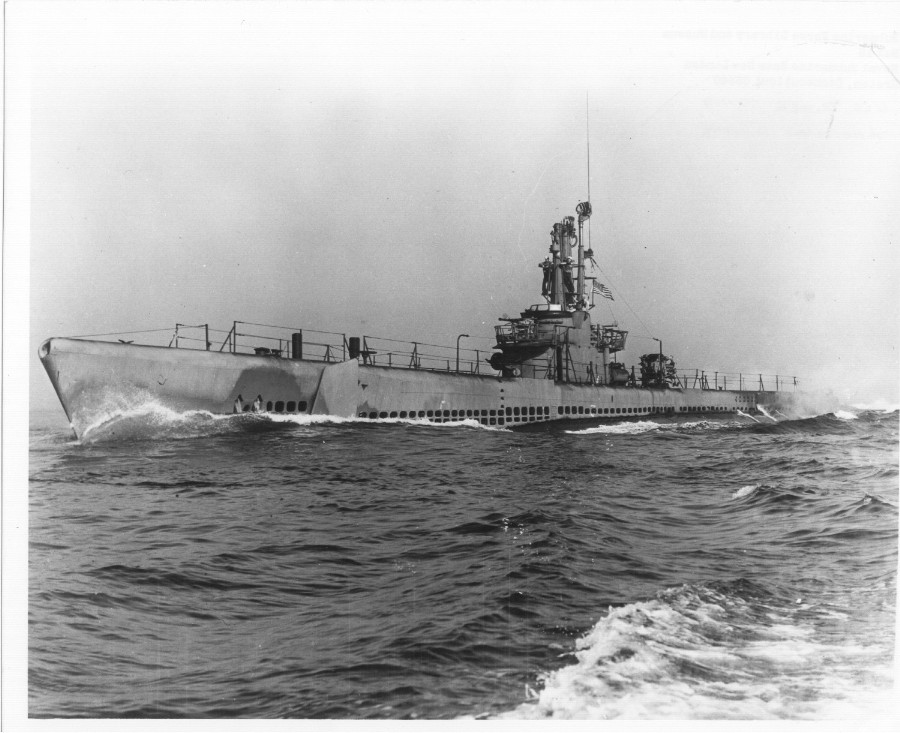
McWethy commanded the USS Piper from 1952 to 1954. US Navy photo.

After the war, McWethy had a number of additional assignments on submarines: executive officer of USS Picuda (SS-382) then as executive officer of USS Skate (SS-305).

1951–1952, LCDR McWethy was a student at the Naval War College in Newport. From 1952 to 1954, he commanded the submarine USS Piper. His successor as captain, Marmaduke G. Bayne (later a rear admiral), remarked in an interview with the Naval Historical Foundation that "Bob McWethy was probably the best ship handler I have known. He was one with the ship."

=== Navigation of the Arctic ===
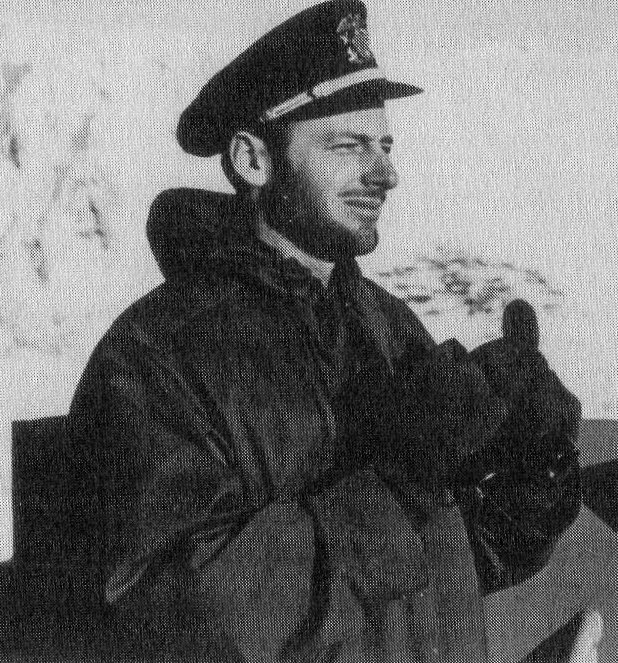
Capt (then Lt Cmdr) Robert McWethy serving aboard the US Navy icebreaker USS Burton Island in 1950. US Navy photo.

“The idea of submarines operating beneath the ice soon became an obsession for McWethy,” wrote William R. Anderson in The Ice Diaries: The Untold Story of the Cold War’s Most Daring Mission. “Russia was the new threat. The Arctic region was in Russia’s backyard, What better platform from which to stealthily operate and keep an eye on them than a submersible ship?"

Working with his friend Waldo Lyon, McWethy was instrumental in drawing up the Pentagon's plans for navigation of the Arctic by nuclear submarine in 1957. As chief-of-staff for Submarine Squadron 10, wrote the orders that sent USS Nautilus on its secret crossing underneath the North Pole on August 3, 1958.

=== Development of SOSUS ===
McWethy was assigned to OSL in 1961. "It was an exciting time," he recalled in a speech in 2004. "The Soviets had just started sending nuclear submarines into the Atlantic."

McWethy was appointed Commander Oceanographic System Atlantic (COSL) in June 1965 and commanded SOSUS operations in the Atlantic for three years

McWethy received the Legion of Merit for "exceptionally meritorious" work on SOSUS. He "successfully directed the widespread operations of the Atlantic Oceanographic System during a period of considerable growth and improvement," according to his citation, "and was "responsible for greatly improved classified oceanographic systems and techniques of great importance to the security of the United States."

== Personal life ==
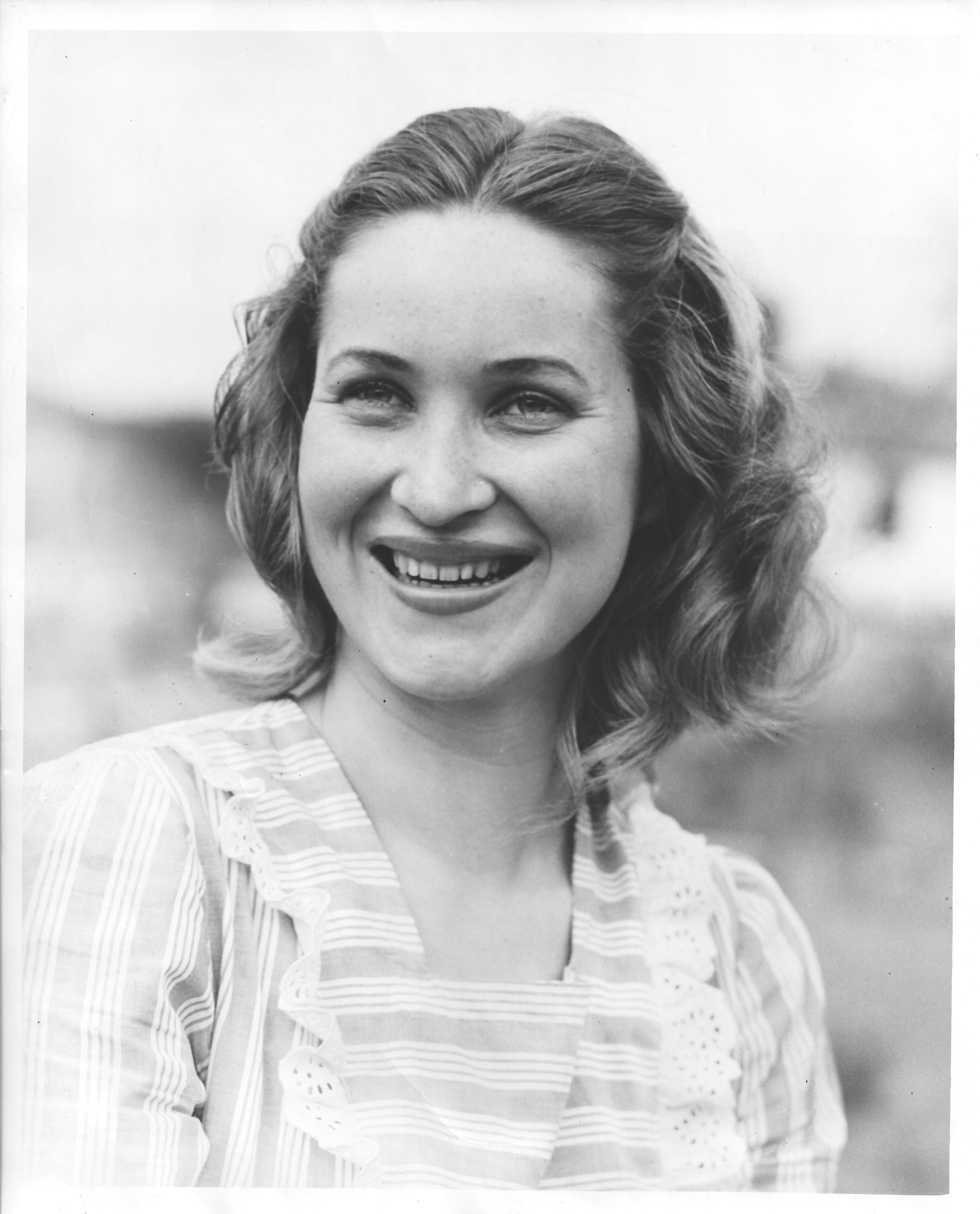
In 1951, McWethy married Margaret Clarke, who was photographed at the launching of LST-943, which she had sponsored, on 8 August 1944 at the Bethlehem-Hingham Shipyard, Inc. in Hingham, Mass. US Navy photo.

In 1951, McWethy married Margaret Clarke, the daughter of Adm. William P. O. Clarke. After retirement in 1970, McWethy and his wife lived in an 1850s farmhouse on Weems Creek and were heavily involved in efforts to preserve the environment of the Severn River in Maryland, and particularly Weems Creek. In 1993, the Annapolis Capital Gazette reported on the couple's preservation efforts, including Liz McWethy's threat to "strip naked and chain her body to a tree to save the woody banks" of the creek. Liz served as chairman of the Weems Creek Conservancy. McWethy died in January 2018 at the age of 98.

=== Sailing ===
Capt. McWethy had been an active sailor since his days at the Naval Academy. "In the fall he spends his week-ends sailing," noted his Lucky Bag yearbook, "and with the coming of spring he is torn between the golf course and the Bay."

After retirement, McWethy became involved with the sailing program at the U.S. Naval Academy. In 1980 he was the third recipient of the A.G.B. Grosvenor Award for "exemplary contributions to the mission and programs of the sailing squadron." In 1985, Yachting Magazine wrote that "Bob McWethy, a retired captain who has been a continuing stabilizing factor at Annapolis as offshore coach and race-committee head for midshipman sailing, is also a sparkplug in USNSA as its secretary."

The Robert D. McWethy Fund sponsored by the US Naval Sailing Foundation raises funds to honor McWethy's 35 years of service to Navy Sailing.

== Awards ==
Capt. McWethy received the Silver Star Award for his actions as torpedo officer during a war patrol in enemy-controlled waters of the Pacific Ocean which resulted in the sinking of two Japanese freighters and a 20,000-ton transport and in the successful evasion of severe enemy countermeasures.

He received the Legion of Merit for his role as commander of Oceanographic Systems Atlantic.

McWethy received the Alexander G.B. Grosvenor Award in 1980 for 35 years of service to Navy Sailing.

== Writings ==
- "Arms Control and the Navy: When does a ship become an armament for negotiating purposes?", Naval Review Annual, 1966. United States Naval Institute.
- “The Arctic Submarine,” Naval Institute Proceedings, Sept 1952, p. 955 (4 p)
- “Significance of the Nautilus Polar Cruise,” Naval Institute Proceedings, May 1958, p. 32 (4 p)
