= William Clarke (writer) =

British writer

- Born: 1800
- Died: 17 June 1838 (aged 37–38)
- Occupation: Writer

William Clarke (1800 – 17 June 1838) was a British writer.

== Biography ==
Clarke was the author of "The Boys' Own Book," "Three Courses and a Dessert," and various works of light literature, which obtained a considerable measure of popularity. He also brought out a humorous periodical, called "The Cigar," and he was for some time editor of the "Monthly Magazine." For the last three or four years of his life he devoted himself to an elaborate work on natural history. This does not appear to have been published, nor are any of his other writings extant. While working in his garden, in his house near Hampstead, he died of an apoplectic fit on 17 June 1838.
