= Dave Wilkes =

English footballer (1964–2023)

Personal information
- Date of birth: 10 March 1964
- Place of birth: Barnsley, England
- Date of death: 22 June 2023 (aged 59)
- Position: Midfielder

Youth career
- Barnsley

Senior career*
| Years | Team | Apps | (Gls) |
| 1981–1984 | Barnsley | 17 | (2) |
| 1983 | → Halifax Town (loan) | 4 | (0) |
| 1984–1986 | Harps | | |
| 1986–1987 | Stockport County | 8 | (0) |
| 1987–1988 | Frickley Athletic | | |
| 1988–1990 | Bridlington Town | | |
| 1990–1992 | Carlisle United | 5 | (0) |

Managerial career
- 1997: Carlisle United (caretaker manager)
- * Club domestic league appearances and goals

David Wilkes (10 March 1964 – 22 June 2023) was an English professional football midfielder who played for Barnsley, Carlisle United, Halifax Town, Stockport County, Frickley Athletic, Guiseley and Bridlington Town.

== Playing career ==
=== Barnsley ===
Wilkes started his career with his hometown club Barnsley, but injury plagued his career there. He made seventeen Football League appearances for them between 1981 and 1984, scoring twice. He was sent out on loan in March 1983 to Halifax Town, for whom he made four league appearances, before returning at the end of March.

He joined Hong Kong Harps in January 1984. Harps went on to get to the Hong Kong FA cup final, losing on penalties after extra time to South China. Wilkes returned for one more season with Harps the following season before returning to the UK due to a ban on foreign players.

Wilkes joined Stockport County for one season but played few games due to a knee injury. He then played for three Non-League teams (Frickley Athletic, Guiseley and Bridlington Town) before joining Carlisle.

=== Carlisle United ===
Wilkes joined Carlisle United in 1990 and played five league games for them. He retired from playing to become the club's youth-team coach in 1992.

== Coaching career ==
=== Carlisle United ===
After retiring in 1992, Wilkes joined Carlisle United as Youth Development Officer. In 1995, under Mick Wadsworth, he stepped up to a senior coaching role. He also was caretaker manager when Mervyn Day left the club in 1997.

==== Michael Knighton period ====
In 1997, then-Carlisle United chairman Michael Knighton refused to look for a new manager after Mervyn Day's departure, so he took over team selection and coaching. He was helped by John Halpin and Wilkes, who were both directors of coaching.

=== Newcastle United ===
Around 1999, after leaving his post at Carlisle United, Wilkes joined Newcastle United's academy on the invitation of academy manager Alan Irvine.

=== Huddersfield Town ===
On 9 July 2002, Wilkes joined Mick Wadsworth at Huddersfield Town as first-team coach. Wadsworth was sacked in January 2003, but the club could not pay him out, so he was reinstated. He was sacked again in March 2003, although Wilkes stayed as coach under caretaker-manager Mel Machin. He left in May 2003, along with Machin and goalkeeping coach Dave Watson, when Huddersfield were placed into administration.

=== Return to Carlisle United ===
Wilkes re-joined Carlisle United in 2005 as the head of their Centre of Excellence. As of 2019, he was still performing this role.

== Death ==
Wilkes died on 22 June 2023, at the age of 59.
