= William P. O. Clarke =

U.S. Navy admiral (1893–1949)

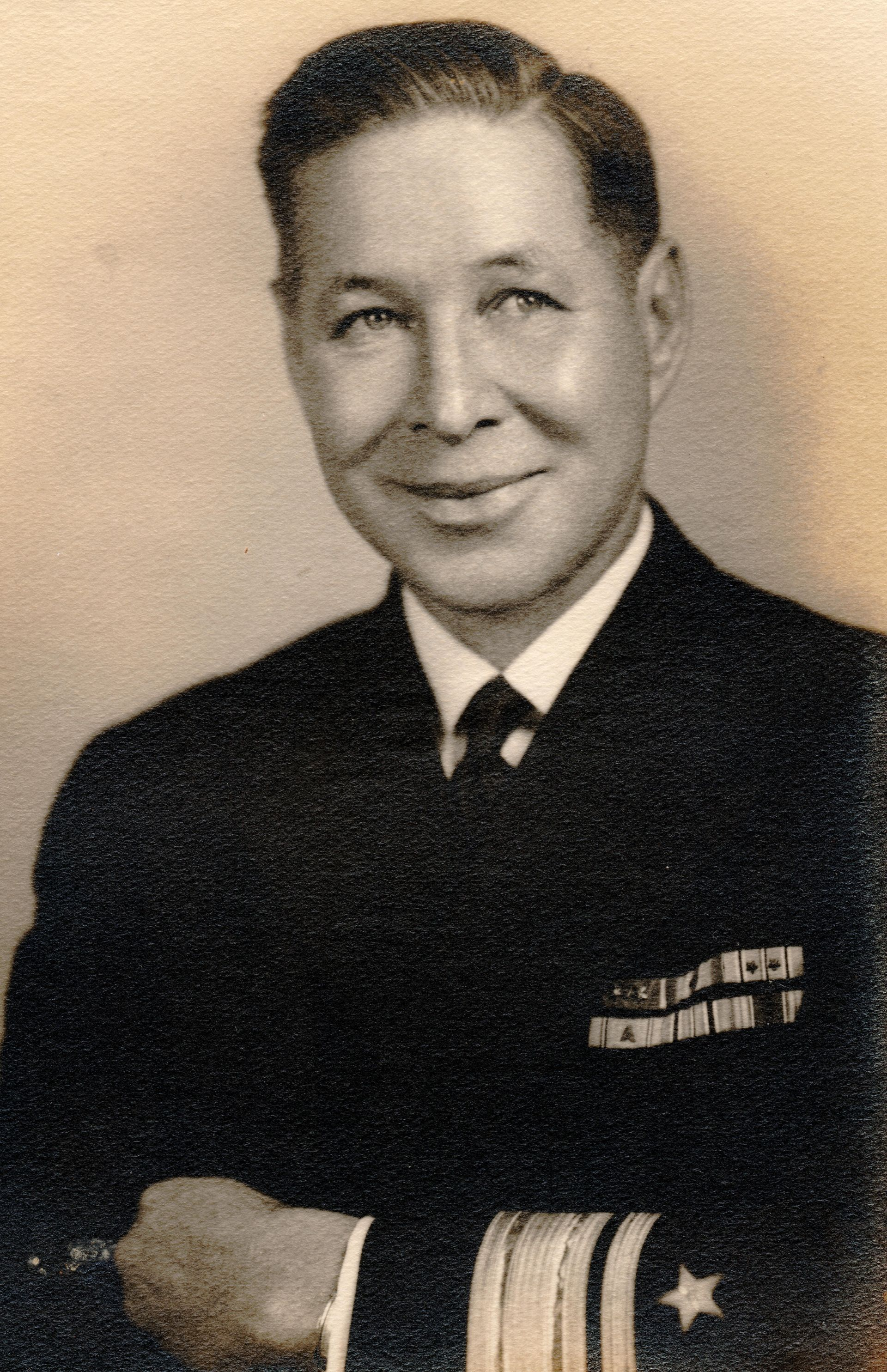
- Born: June 22, 1893; Mott, California, U.S.
- Died: November 9, 1949 (aged 56); Annapolis, Maryland, U.S.
- Spouse: Frances Bryan Clarke (1889–1985)
- Military career
- Allegiance: United States
- Branch: United States Navy
- Service years: 1917–1949
- Rank: Rear Admiral
- Nicknames: Bill, WOP
- Service number: 10909
- Conflicts: World War I; World War II; Operation Torch; Okinawa; Iwo Jima
- Awards: Legion of Merit

William Price Oliver Clarke (22 June 1893 – 9 November 1949) was a U.S. Navy admiral who led the effort to train landing craft crews for amphibious operations during World War II. He later participated in Operation Torch in North Africa and the battles of Okinawa and Iwo Jima in the Pacific. Clarke was awarded the Legion of Merit three times.

== Early years ==
William P.O. Clarke was born on 22 June 1893 in Mott, California, to Ellen and Charles Oliver Clarke Jr., both immigrants from England. They originally settled in Texas and then moved to northern California, where Charles worked as a lumberman. Later, he was listed in the local census as being a justice of the peace and insurance agent.

In July 1912, U.S. Representative John E. Raker nominated William Clarke to the U.S. Naval Academy. The academy's Lucky Bag yearbook for 1917 described him as "a fellow with the map of a big heart written all over his face". Clarke played on the varsity football team, rowed crew, and was elected Regimental Staff Petty Officer of the class of 1917 (one of the six officers of the class). His Navy colleagues frequently called him "WOP", a transposition of his initials.

In 1923, Clarke received an M.S. degree from MIT, co-authoring a dissertation entitled "Effect of Roll of Ship on Fall of Shot When Using Director Fire".

== Career ==
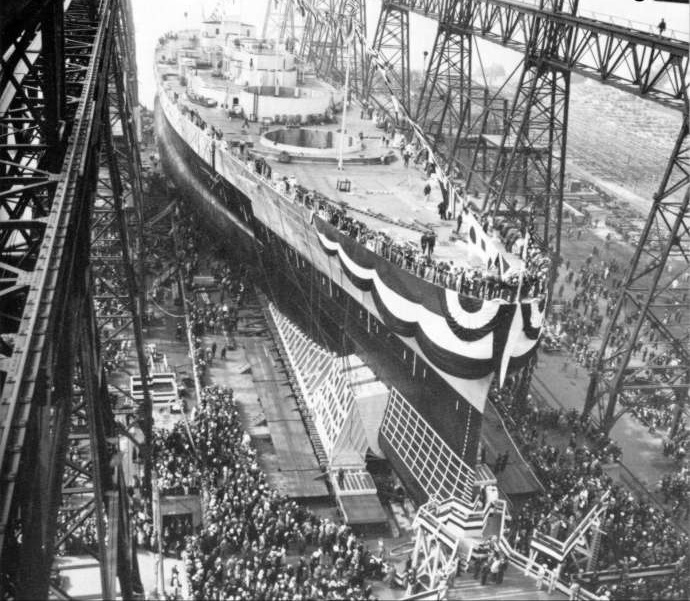
As the Executive Officer of USS Washington, Admiral (then Capt) Clarke helped the ship achieve combat readiness after launching.

After graduating from the Naval Academy, Clarke served on the battleships North Dakota, Arkansas, Utah, and Texas, as a gunnery officer on the cruiser USS Quincy, and as a Lieutenant Commander aboard USS Florida, lead ship of the Florida class of dreadnought battleships. Clarke also taught mathematics at the Naval Academy during the 1930s.

In March 1941, Clarke was named Executive Officer of the USS Washington, which was considered "a prize assignment" according to Naval historian Fletcher Pratt because she was the first new battleship the Navy had launched since 1921. Pratt wrote that Clarke was "a big, husky guy with no nonsense about him." He distinguished himself by his organizational skills and capable writing of the Ship's Organization, "a list of the duties of every man for every possible ordinary contingency" including duties in case of fire, collision, and damage control.

"WOP Clarke whipped the ship into one of the best, if not the best unit in the fleet," Capt. James G. Ross, an officer who served under Clarke, told the author of a book about the Washington. "Putting a battleship into commission is a lot—-a lot—-of work. You've got to take care of all conceivable emergencies, like man overboard, abandon ship, fire, fire and rescue, everything you can think of. He put the ship in commission, and pretty much ran it for a year. He was a brilliant organizer." On 22 February 1942, Clarke left Washington for his new assignment.

=== Landing Craft Group ===
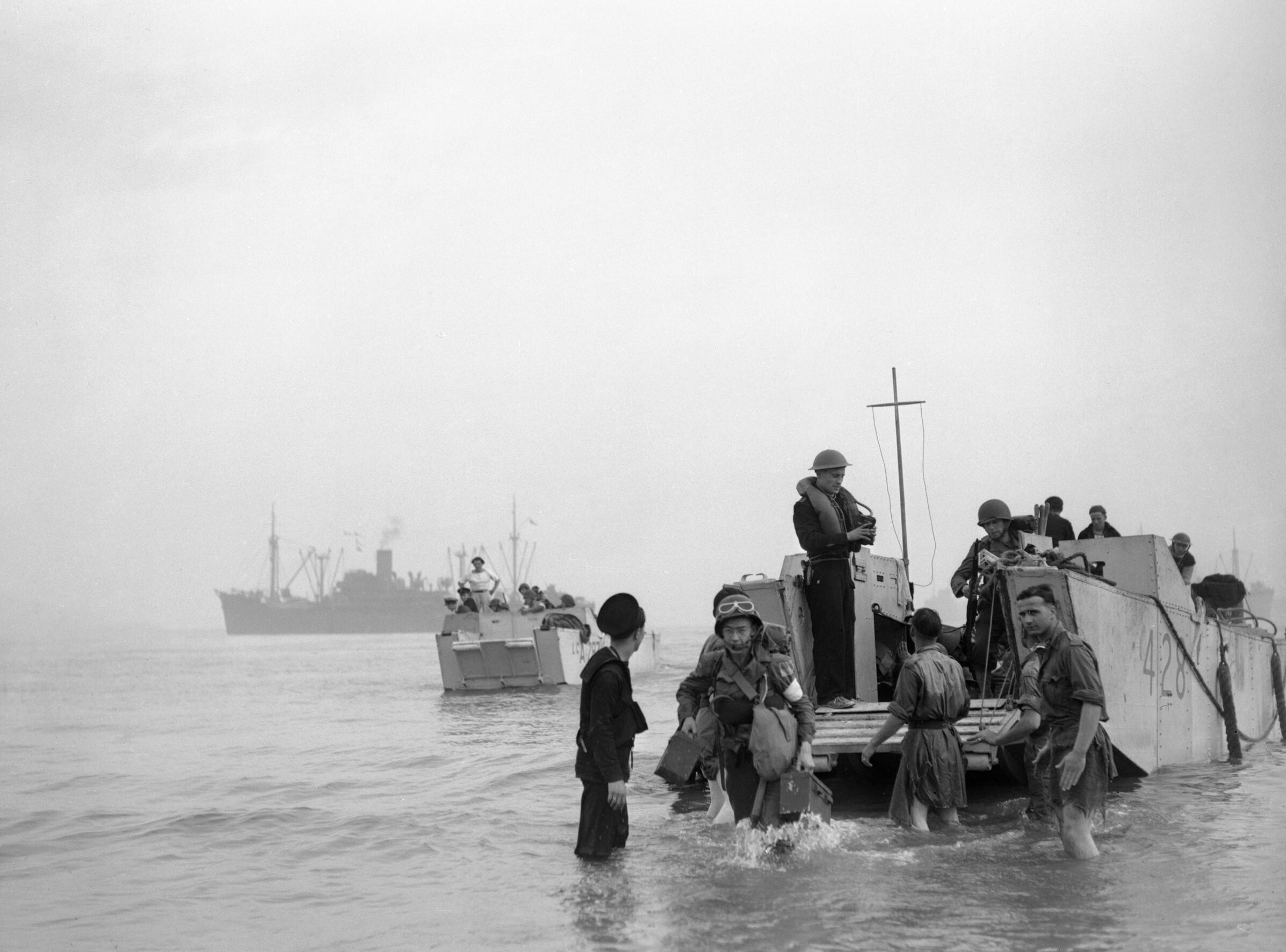
Ships and crews trained by Clarke and the Landing Craft Group landed in Algeria during Operation 'Torch', November 1942, and in "all subsequent major amphibious operations in the Atlantic, Pacific, and Mediterranean theatres," according to his citation for the Legion of Merit.

After Pearl Harbor, the Army and Navy began intense planning for the transport of millions of men into combat and for amphibious operations. Clarke was transferred to the flagship of Commander Transports, an old American Export Line ship that had been built for the Army in the last war. The old "dirty and hot" transport ship, stationed at Norfolk, was just back from service in India and had so many cockroaches they crunched under the sailors' feet in the hallways.

To Capt. Clarke's surprise, he was handled orders to "secure, organize, and train crews for approximately 1,800 landing craft" including LSTs and LCIs, which were still in the design phase. The Navy's plans required that 30,000 men and 3,000 officers be trained in a matter of months. "Where do we get the men?" Clarke asked his commanding officer, Capt. Emmett. "And how do we train them for ships that have never been seen?" Emmett replied that, "For this job we have the highest priority in the service," but initially Clarke was given only a staff of two officers and a yeoman.

In creating the landing craft training, Clarke benefited from his experience aboard USS Washington, where as XO he had written the ship's rules and organizational charts even before the battleship was launched. He studied blueprints for the new landing craft and "from these paper drawings he prepared ship's organizations for each type. This was the first textbook for crews assigned to the large landing craft. From this, they were to be trained in what their duties were to be, what the ship would be like, and how it would be expected to operate."

The Landing Craft Group eventually rented the Nansemond Hotel, a popular resort hotel on Virginia Beach near Norfolk, to use as its headquarters. Eventually, 40 major amphibious operations would be planned at the old hotel.

In August 1942, Capt. Clarke was told about Operation Torch and the secret plans to invade North Africa in November 1942. He had only a few months to train thousands of men, most of whom were just out of indoctrination school. "They were the butchers, the bakers, and the light bulb makers of American youth," observed Eric Burton, a Navy officer who wrote a semi-official account during the war about the Landing Craft Group. Clarke created training programs for Naval personnel in hydrographic, maintenance, medical, and communications sections, and programs for Army shore parties to learn how to unload landing craft. Exercises were held around the clock, day and night. "It was never a question of whether we could do the thing," Clarke told Burton. "It was a situation where the time to invade was right and we had to do it."

"Captain Clarke had less than two months, about one-third of what had been considered the minimum, to train these men to conduct night ship-to-shore landings," wrote historian Samuel Eliot Morison in his history of the U.S. Navy in World War II. "Considering the time limitations, his performance was remarkable."

=== Later actions in World War II ===
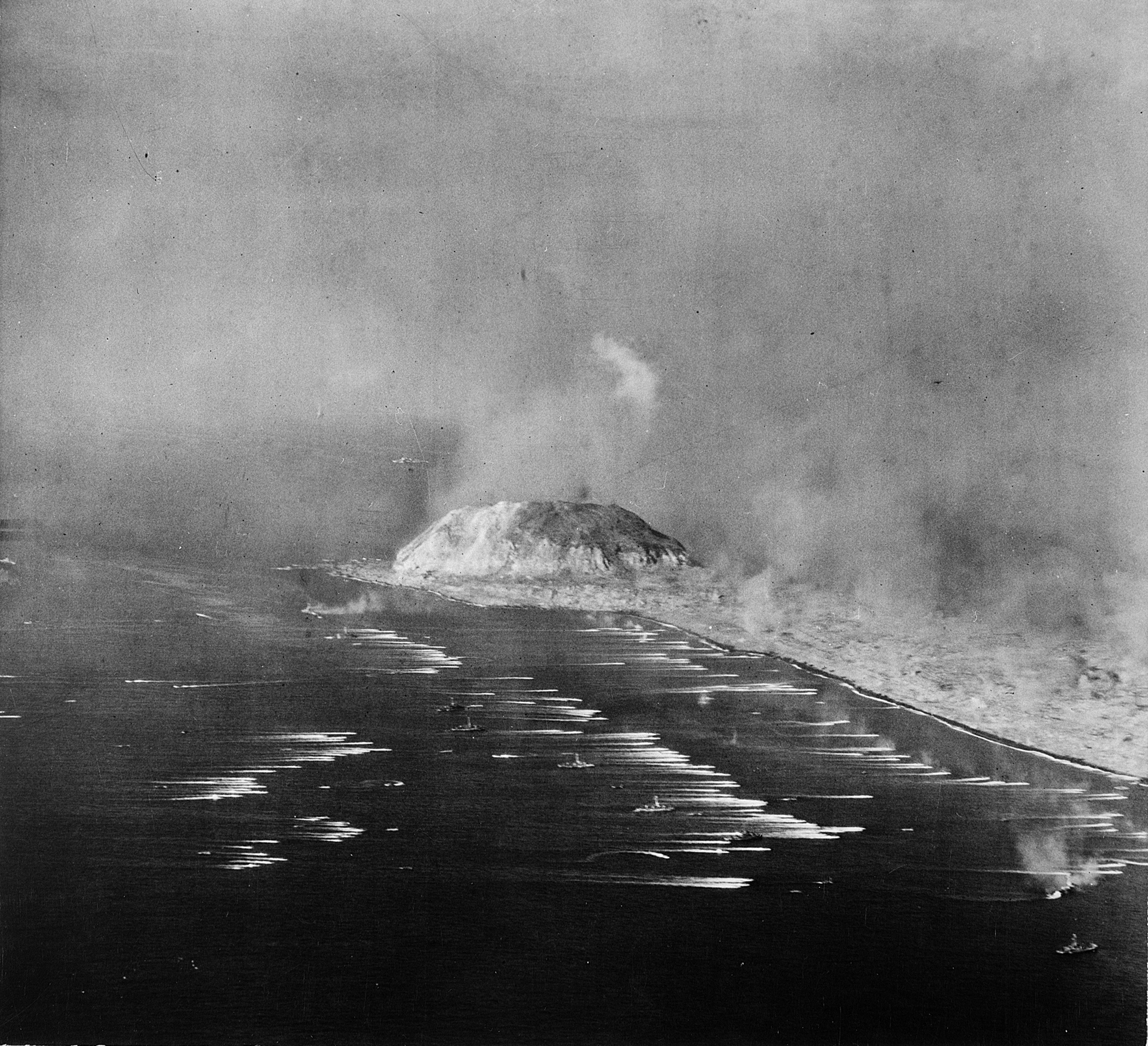
Landing craft steam toward shore during the invasion of Iwo Jima in February 1945. In his service as Chief of Staff for the Amphibious Forces, Adm. Clarke "effectively coordinated the detailed study and planning of these extended operations against the enemy," according to a citation from James Forrestal, Secretary of the Navy.

Clarke was hospitalized for exhaustion and a heart condition in 1943. After returning from medical leave, he served from January to October 1944 as Chief of Staff to the Commander Amphibious Training Command, Atlantic Fleet, which trained crews for the landings in Sicily, Anzio, Normandy, and southern France. The Secretary of the Navy, James Forrestal, signed a citation awarding Capt. Clarke a Gold Star in lieu of a second Legion of Merit for his work in this "assignment of vital importance...the establishment and maintenance of a high state of combat readiness of amphibious ships and craft."

Military historian Irwin Kappes summed up the wartime contributions of landing craft, which rarely get the attention given to other types of naval ships such as carriers, as follows:

World War II was the first war demanding entire fleets of highly-specialized landing craft. Each was designed to accomplish a unique task. There were craft for putting the first wave ashore; craft to fire rockets and lay smoke screens; craft to provide antiaircraft flak. Most important were the huge craft that were purposely run aground to open their three-story doors and spew forth battle-ready troops and tanks. Among Navy ships, the LSTs, unlovely as they were in appearance, were second only to aircraft carriers among surface ships in their contribution to final victory.

In the fall of 1944 Clarke was transferred to the Pacific Theater, where he served as Chief of Staff of the Fifth Amphibious Force (formerly known as the Fast Carrier Task Force) under the command of Adm. William Halsey. By early 1945 V Corps included eighteen aircraft carriers, eight battleships and two battlecruisers, along with numerous cruisers and destroyers. He commanded amphibious landings during the battles of Iwo Jima and Okinawa, for which he was awarded a Gold Star in lieu of the Legion of Merit for a third time.

== Awards ==
On December 7, 1943, Adm. Royal Ingersoll, the Commander in Chief, U.S. Atlantic Fleet, awarded Capt. Clarke the Legion of Merit "for exceptionally meritorious conduct in the performance of outstanding service as Commander Landing Craft Group of the Amphibious Force, United States Atlantic Fleet, during the preparation for major amphibious operations." The citation read, in part,

"Commencing in the early part of 1942, Captain Clarke with extreme initiative and outstanding ability organized and established training facilities and carried out an extensive training program to provide efficient operating complements of officers and men for all types of newly constructed landing ships and craft. His aggressive leadership and perseverance under many handicaps and trying conditions brought these ships and craft to a high state of readiness for combat operations in all subsequent major amphibious operations in the Atlantic, Pacific, and Mediterranean theatres.

Adm. Clarke was awarded two Gold Stars in lieu of the Legion of Merit for later service during the War. One was for his role in the planning for D-Day and the other landings in Europe. The other was for his service as Chief of Staff for Amphibious Force Commander commanding amphibious operations at Iwo Jima, which read: Frances Clarke's grandfather was Dr. Samuel M. Bemiss, a doctor in the Confederate Army who

Resourceful, able, and well-informed regarding all phases of amphibious warfare, Captain Clarke effectively coordinated the detailed study and planning of these extended operations against the enemy and, cooly [sic?] disregarding the tremendous volume of enemy gunfire during savage hostile attacks directed against ships of his task force, rendered invaluable assistance."

== Personal life and family ==
In 1920, Clarke married Frances Bryan of New Orleans, the daughter of Navy Capt. Samuel Bryan. The couple bought Lilac Hill, a historic home on 12 acres overlooking Weems Creek in Annapolis, which is now preserved in the Severn River Land Trust. Her grandfather was Samuel M. Bemiss a doctor and medical professor in Louisiana who chaired the U.S. Yellow Fever Commission in 1878. During the Civil War, Bemiss was in charge of hospitals in the Confederate Army of Tennessee, treated Robert E. Lee in 1863, and was the first to diagnose the heart condition which he died from in 1870.

During and after World War II, Clarke suffered from the effects of exhaustion and a heart condition. "In order to do what had to be done, [Clarke] gave of himself so unsparingly that he finally broke down in early 1943 and had to be hospitalized and later retired," recalled Adm. Kent Hewitt, Commander of the North Atlantic Fleet during the War, in his memoirs. "He passed away in 1949, a victim of disabilities thus incurred. I consider him to have truly given his life for his country, to have been a real war casualty."

After his death at the age of 56 on Nov. 9, 1949, Clarke was buried in the Naval Academy Cemetery in Annapolis, Maryland. His wife, Frances Bryan Clarke, died in 1985 and is buried beside him.

Adm. Clarke's older son, William P.O. Clarke Jr., graduated from the Navy Academy, served on experimental hydrofoils XCH-4, XCH-6, and Sea Wings boats, and later commanded H.S. Denison. After leaving the Navy, he worked for Grumman as a contract negotiator on the Apollo Lunar Module and Space Shuttle programs. He died in 2009.

His younger son, John H.O. Clarke, served in the Navy in World War II, and was recalled to active Naval service during the Korean War. He was a patent attorney for 40 years in Washington, D.C., and died in 1994.

Clarke's daughter, Margaret Elizabeth Clarke, married Capt. Robert D. McWethy, a submarine commander during World War II and pioneer of navigation under the Polar ice cap. Capt McWethy received the Legion of Merit for his role in the development of SOSUS underwater listening posts as Commander, Oceanographic System Atlantic.

Clarke's granddaughter, Deborah Clarke Grosvenor, was the acquisitions editor for the Naval Institute Press who discovered Tom Clancy when she acquired his first novel, The Hunt for Red October. She is now a literary agent and married to publisher Edwin S. Grosvenor.

== Reading list ==
Burton, Lt. Earl, By Sea and By Land: The Story of Our Amphibious Forces, Whittlesey House (McGraw-Hill), London and New York, 1944. ISBN 1406756555. See Chapter 5, "Landing Craft Group, pp. 64–80.
