= Clerke baronets =

Baronetcy in the Baronetage of England

There have been three baronetcies created for members of the Clerke family. One creation is extant as of 2008.

The Clerke Baronetcy, of Hitcham in the County of Buckingham, was created in the Baronetage of England on 13 July 1660 for John Clerke. He was a descendant of Sir John Clerke (d. 1539), who in 1513 captured the Duke of Longueville at the Battle of the Spurs. The seventh Baronet was killed in action at the Battle of Saratoga in 1778. The ninth baronet was a lieutenant-colonel and in the 52nd Regiment and fought at the Battle of Waterloo. Shabbington in Buckinghamshire was the seat of the baronetcy from its creation in 1660 until Sir John Clerke, 4th Baronet sold the manor in 1716.

The Clerke Baronetcy, of Launde Abbey in the County of Leicester, was created in the Baronetage of England on 18 June 1661 for Clement Clerke, an entrepreneur and Gentleman of the Privy Chamber. He was a descendant of Robert Clerke, brother of Sir John Clerke (died 1539), ancestor of the Clerke baronets of Hitcham. The title became extinct on the death of the sixth Baronet in 1759.

The Clerke Baronetcy, of Duddlestone, was created in the Baronetage of Great Britain on 26 October 1774 for Philip Jenning Clerke of Duddlestone, Shropshire but was extinct on his death in 1788. He was born Philip Jennings but added Clerke as an additional surname. He was Member of Parliament for Totnes 1768–88.

== Clerke baronets, of Hitcham (1660) ==
- Sir John Clerke, 1st Baronet (c. 1622–1667)
- Sir William Clerke, 2nd Baronet (1643–1678)
- Sir William Clerke, 3rd Baronet (c. 1662–1699)
- Sir John Clerke, 4th Baronet (1683–1727)
- Sir William Clerke, 5th Baronet (died c. 1738)
- Sir Francis Clerke, 6th Baronet (1682–1769)
- Sir Francis Clerke, 7th Baronet (1748–1777)
- Sir William Henry Clerke, 8th Baronet (1751–1818)
- Sir William Henry Clerke, 9th Baronet (1793–1861)
- Sir William Henry Clerke, 10th Baronet (1822–1882)
- Sir William Francis Clerke, 11th Baronet (1856–1930)
- Sir John Edward Longueville Clerke, 12th Baronet (1913–2009)
- Sir Francis Ludlow Longueville Clerke, 13th Baronet (born 1953)

The heir apparent to the baronetcy is William Francis Talbot Clerke (born 1987), only son of the 13th Baronet.

== Clerke baronets, of Launde Abbey (1661) ==
Escutcheon of the Clerke baronets of Launde Abbey

- Sir Clement Clerke, 1st Baronet (died 1693)
- Sir Talbot Clerke, 2nd Baronet (died c. 1708)
- Sir Clement Clerke, 3rd Baronet (died c. 1715)
- Sir Talbot Clerke, 4th Baronet (died 1724)
- Sir Talbot Clerke, 5th Baronet (c. 1719–1732)
- Sir Talbot Clerke, 6th Baronet (died 1759)

== Clerke baronets of Duddlestone (1774) ==
- Sir Philip Jennings-Clerke, 1st Baronet (1722–1788)
- Sir Charles Philip Jennings, 2nd Baronet (died 1788)

== See also ==
- Clark baronets
- Clarke baronets
- Clerk baronets
- Clerk family
