= Bill Clarke (Australian footballer) =

Australian rules footballer

Personal information
- Full name: William Clarke
- Born: 5 October 1882; Fitzroy, Victoria
- Died: 5 November 1945 (aged 63); Fitzroy North, Victoria

Playing career^{1}
Years	Club	Games (Goals)
1906	South Melbourne	1 (0)
- ^{1} Playing statistics correct to the end of 1906.

Bill Clarke (5 October 1882 – 5 November 1945) was an Australian rules footballer who played with South Melbourne in the Victorian Football League (VFL).
