= William Penn Clarke =

American journalist, lawyer, and politician (1817–1903)

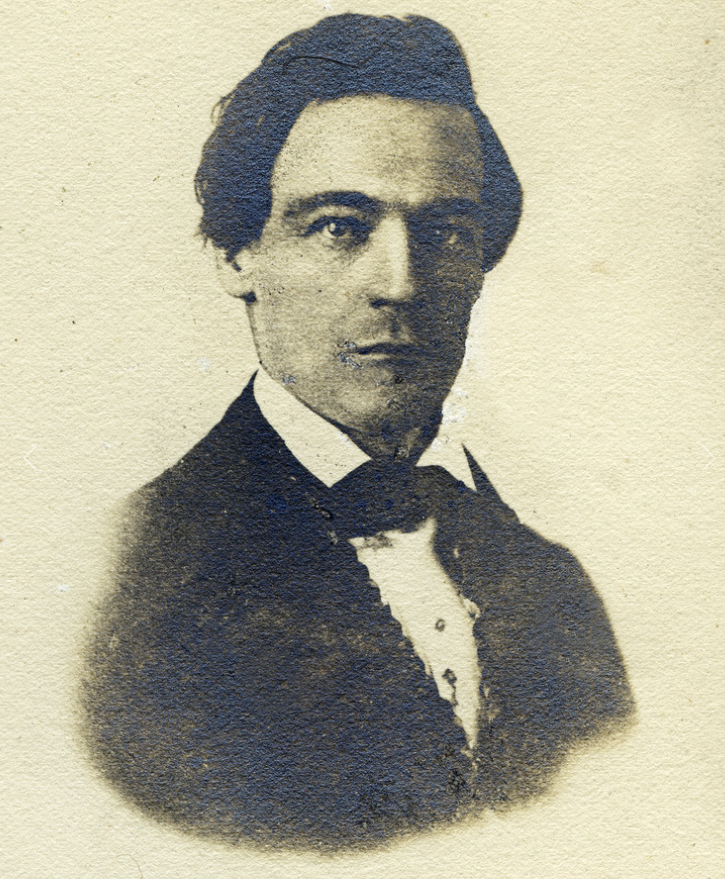
- Born: 1817; Baltimore, Maryland
- Died: February 7, 1903 (aged 85); Washington D.C.

William Penn Clarke (1817–1903) was an American journalist, lawyer, and politician known for his activity related to the early statehood of Iowa. Clarke was an outspoken abolitionist, Underground Railroad organizer, a member of the Free Soil party, and a prominent lawyer in Iowa City for most of his career until moving to Washington D.C. after the Civil War. During the Civil War, Clarke served as paymaster at the rank of lieutenant colonel for the Union.

== Biography ==
William Penn Clarke was born in Baltimore, Maryland on October 1, 1817. While a teenager, Clarke apprenticed with the publisher of a newspaper in Gettysburg, Pennsylvania. He headed west, spending time in Pittsburgh, Washington D.C., Cincinnati, and New Orleans before settling in Iowa City in 1844.

Clarke served as editor of The Iowa Standard, a Whig newspaper published by William Crum, for his first few years in Iowa. As his reputation grew, he began to write political editorials in The Iowa Standard and many other regional newspapers. Clarke began to be involved in politics around 1846, but his popularity reached a pinnacle in 1857 when he participated in Iowa's third constitutional convention that ratified the current state constitution.

After the state constitutional convention of 1857, Clarke served as reporter of the Supreme Court of Iowa until being appointed a paymaster of the federal army in 1863. After the end of the Civil War, Clarke served as chief clerk of the federal interior department in Washington D.C. but was removed from that position by Andrew Johnson. He held a private law practice in Washington D.C. from around 1870 to his death in 1903.

== Journalism ==
William Penn Clarke's first profession was as a journalist and publisher of newspapers. In the 1820s–1830s, he apprenticed in Gettysburg, Pennsylvania with Robert G. Harper, the printer and publisher of a newspaper called The Adams Sentinel. Afterwards, Clarke worked at The Daily News in Pittsburgh and Cincinnati. Clarke went into partnership to start a newspaper in Galveston, Texas, but it never materialized. He served as editor of The Gazette in Logan, Ohio for a short time. After moving to Iowa in 1844, he served as editor of The Iowa Standard in 1845 and again in 1856. Throughout the 1840s and 1850s, Clarke wrote many political editorials in newspapers across Iowa for various causes that he championed. He criticized the state constitutional convention of 1844 and wrote polemical open letters to politicians. His work as a journalist aided his political aims and he often leveraged newspaper articles for his causes.

He returned to journalism in 1857-1862 when he published eight volumes of Iowa Reports. These volumes were legal reports and commentary summarizing the proceedings and decisions of Iowa Supreme Court.

== Politics ==
Clarke first became involved in politics as a critical voice of the 1844 state constitutional convention of Iowa. He wrote many editorials criticizing and supporting various political figures during elections throughout the 1840s and 1850s. He was selected to serve as an official in the Republican party of Iowa in 1857 and was considered as the party's gubernatorial candidate. He was very active in the state constitutional convention of 1857, serving on 11 different committees and speaking in front of the delegates 266 times on various subjects.

William Penn Clarke was involved in the Free Soil party as early as 1849 and was a lifelong abolitionist. Excerpts from his speeches indicate that he advocated for Black suffrage at the 1857 constitutional convention. Clarke aided John Brown and J. B. Grinnell in their efforts of conducting the Underground Railroad through Iowa. There is evidence that Clarke was aware of John Brown's plans in 1859 for an anti-slavery raid before it happened.

== Law ==
It is not clear where William Penn Clarke learned the practice of law from, but he was admitted to the bar in 1846. He would continue to practice law beside his work as a journalist and politician for the rest of his career and was considered the top member of the bar association in Iowa by the mid-1850s. From 1856 to 1859 he had a partnership with John C. Henley called Clarke & Henley. He partnered with William C. Gaston in 1867 and specialized in the collection of soldiers' pay after the Civil War. In the 1869 and onward, he had a partnership in Washington D.C. with John J. Weed known as Weed & Clarke. From 1850 to 1865, Clarke's name was associated with 131 different cases brought before the Supreme Court of Iowa. Some of these cases achieved notoriety including the Boyd Wilkinson land dispute that caused a mob and the death of Clarke's client. As well as the case for the county seat of Marshall County, disputed between Marshalltown and Marietta.

During the 1850s and 1860s, William Penn Clarke taught several aspiring Iowa lawyers and prepared them for admittance to the bar. His most well-known pupils include Samuel Husband Fairall and William Peters Hepburn.

== Library and art collection ==
William Penn Clarke collected books and paintings during his lifetime. Politically, he was an advocate for printed works and access to public education, pushing the state to provide printed volumes of the state constitution to every county and city office in 1857. Charles Auguste Ficke noted Clarke's large Iowa City library in his autobiography and made mention of borrowing books from it, suggesting that Clarke allowed members of his social circle to use his library. His collecting habits meant that Clarke was never particularly financially wealthy despite his long and successful career. He reportedly intended to donate his collection of art to the state of Iowa, but it was sold at auction after his death.
