= William Clerk (administrator) =

William Clerk was the clerk to the Privy Chamber of Henry VIII of England. He was a clerk to the Privy Seal from 1542 to 1548 and had permission to use the dry stamp bearing the King's signature from September 1545.
