= William Clarke (English physician) =

English physician

- Born: c. 1640; Swainswyke, England
- Died: 24 April 1684
- Occupation: Physician

William Clarke (c. 1640 – 24 April 1684) was an English physician.

Clarke was the son of George Clarke, by the sister of William Prynne. He was born at Swainswyke, near Bath; entered Merton College, Oxford; graduated B.A. in 1661; was elected fellow of Merton 1663, and after three years resigned his fellowship, and practised physic at Bath. He wrote a work entitled "The Natural History of Nitre," London, 1670, characterised by boundless conceit, giving all information then attainable on the subject. The substance was published in the "Philosophical Transactions," No. 61. He afterwards practised at Stepney in Middlesex, and died on 24 April 1684.
