= William J. Clark =

Scottish orthodontist

- Years active: 50
- Known for: Developing Twin Block & TransForce Appliance
- Medical career
- Profession: Dentist
- Sub-specialties: Orthodontics
- Research: Growth and Development

Dr. William J. Clark is a Scottish orthodontist known for developing Twin Block Appliance in Orthodontics. This appliance was developed by Dr. Clark in 1977 in Scotland and since then this appliance has been used in correction of Class 2 malocclusions with retrognathic mandible. He also developed invisible TransForce Appliance in 2004.

== Orthodontics ==
Clark is the recipient of the first award for distinction in Orthodontics by British Orthodontic Society. The International Functional Association awarded Clark in 2008 for his contributions to Orthodontics. He published a textbook in 2002 called Twin Block Functional Therapy - Applications in Dentofacial Orthopaedics. Dr. Clark is credited to be the first person part of a teleconference at a dental course in Chicago in 1990 which was eventually transmitted to 25 different cities via satellite.

== Twin-Block Appliance ==
Twin-block appliances are used to correct Class II malocclusions with a deficient mandible. The appliance is removable in nature and involves more patient compliance than fixed functional appliances such as Herbst, Forsus or MARA which are attached to teeth. As the patient bites together, they bite with their mandible forward. Clark recommended the appliance to be worn for at least one year in order to see any growth changes happening. The actual growth of mandible is still a question and literature shows that a Twin-Block appliance is as effective as a Herbst appliance.
