= Sir William Clerke, 8th Baronet =

- Born: 25 November 1751
- Died: 10 April 1818 (aged 66)

Sir William Henry Clerke, 8th Baronet (25 November 1751 – 10 April 1818) was an English clergyman, rector of Bury, Lancashire.

== Education ==
Clerke, of North Weston, Thame and an old Buckinghamshire family, was born 25 November 1751. He and his older brother Sir Francis Clerke, 7th Baronet were both educated at John Roysse's Free School in Abingdon, (now Abingdon School).

He received his later education at Christ Church, Oxford, and was a Bachelor of Civil Law and fellow of All Souls College, Oxford.

== Peerage ==
In 1778 he succeeded to the baronetcy on the death of his older brother Francis, who was the favourite aide-de-camp to General John Burgoyne in North America, and was mortally wounded at Saratoga.

== Career ==
When dying, Francis asked Burgoyne to endeavour, on his return to England, to procure preferment for his brother, who had taken orders. The twelfth Earl of Derby, at the instance no doubt of General Burgoyne, who had married the earl's aunt, presented Clerke to the rectory of Bury, to which he was instituted 6 February 1778, taking his Bachelor of Civil Law degree at Oxford in the October following. He paid much attention to the physical health of his parishioners, vaccinating the children of the poor, and even going to Rochdale once a week for a considerable time to perform the same operation. On the occasion of an outbreak of fever he issued, in 1790, Thoughts upon the Means of Preserving the Health of the Poor by Prevention and Suppression of Epidemic Fever, a pamphlet containing useful sanitary suggestions, and a long letter on its subject-matter by the philanthropic Dr. Thomas Percival.

At a time when a French invasion was feared he printed A Sermon preached in the Parish Church of Bury on 18 October 1798, on the occasion of the colours being presented to the Bury Loyal Association, &c., and A Serious Address to the People of this Country. Appended to the sermon was the speech made on the reception of the colours by the lieutenant-colonel commandant of the Bury Volunteers, the first Sir Robert Peel, whose second wife was Clerke's sister. Another of Clerke's publications is his undated Penitens, or the Dying Tradesman, extracted from the books of a late pious writer. To which is added Prayers, etc.

Clerke employed as his housekeeper the Methodist leader, Elizabeth Rhodes. Clerke wanted to marry her but he didn't like her Methodism. Elizabeth preferred Methodism and married another. Clerke's religious scruples didn't interfere with his business. He sold land to them arguing that he did not mind if they "covered the whole land with chapels".

Clerke was fond of agricultural pursuits and enterprises, and dealt extensively in corn, malt, and lime, borrowing largely in the course of his undertakings. He was a simple-minded man, was fleeced by his subordinates, and at last his living was sequestered for the benefit of his creditors. He died 10 April 1818. He was in the Fleet prison, where he was incarcerated for debt.

== Family ==
In May 1792 Clerke married Byzantia, daughter of Thomas Cartwright of Aynhoe. His eldest son, William Henry, became ninth baronet, and served in the Peninsular War and at the Battle of Waterloo.

Baronetage of England
Preceded by Francis Clerke	Baronet (of Hitcham); 1778–1818	Succeeded by William Henry Clerke

== See also ==
- List of Old Abingdonians
