= Keith Mincher =

English football manager

Keith Mincher is an English football coach and sports psychologist. He is most notable for a very brief spell as manager at Carlisle United in 1999.

Mincher, who played football only at amateur level, worked at Leeds United as a youth coach and was chairman Leslie Silver's choice to succeed Eddie Gray as manager. However following a dressing room revolt the plan was shelved and Doncaster Rovers manager Billy Bremner was appointed instead.

Mincher was appointed manager of Carlisle United on 18 June 1999 but departed the club on 25 June without taking charge of a game. Mincher's resignation came against a background of turmoil at the club under the chairmanship of Michael Knighton.

Mincher has subsequently worked as a sports psychologist at Nottingham Forest, Watford and Colchester United as well as with the England national under-21 football team.
