= List of people associated with Pembroke College, Oxford =

A list of Pembroke College, Oxford people including former students, fellows, honorary fellows, principals and masters of Pembroke College, University of Oxford, England and its predecessor Broadgates Hall. The overwhelming maleness of this list can be partially explained by the fact that for over three centuries (from its foundation in 1624 until 1979), women were barred from studying at Pembroke.

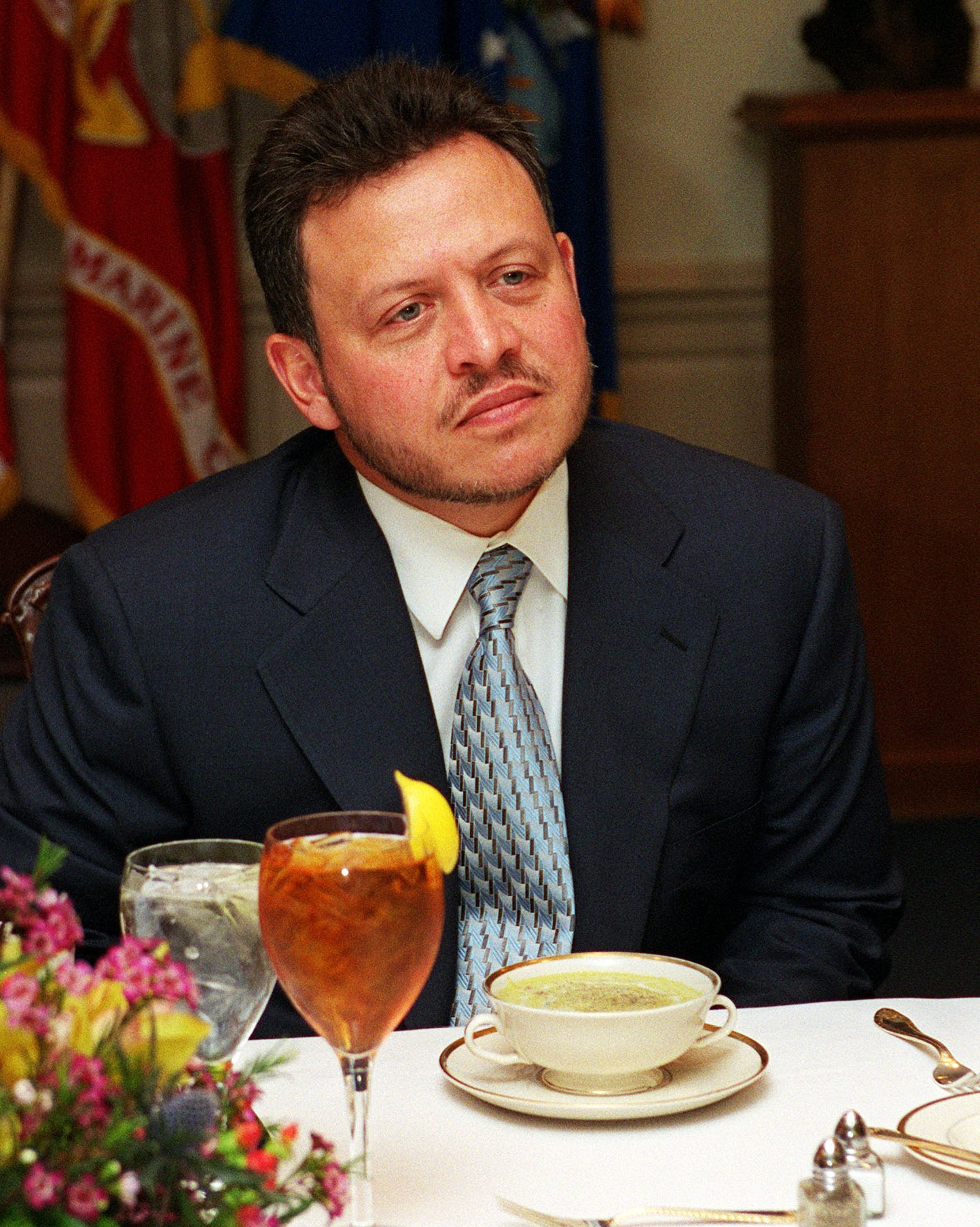
King Abdullah II of Jordan

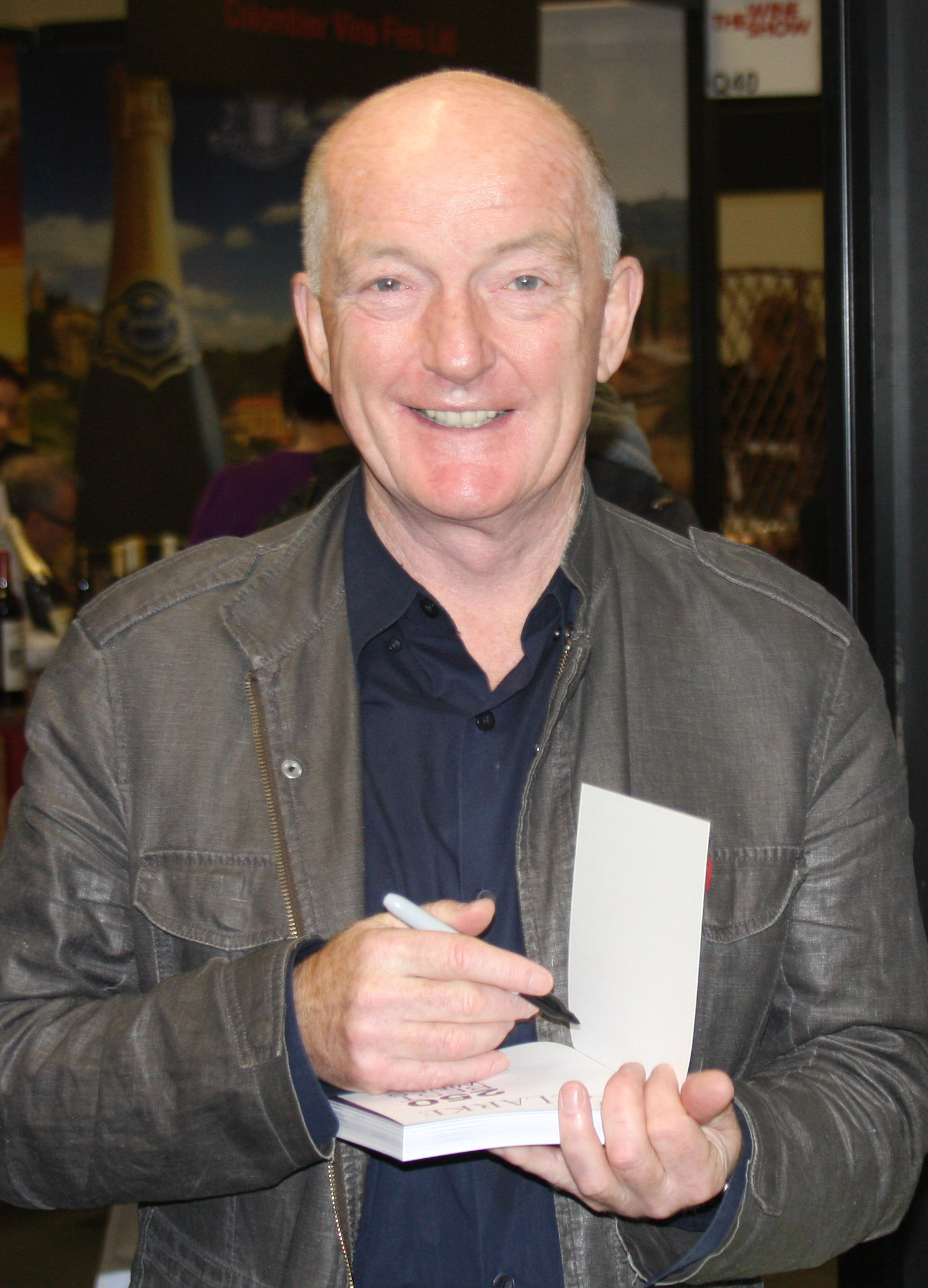
Oz Clarke

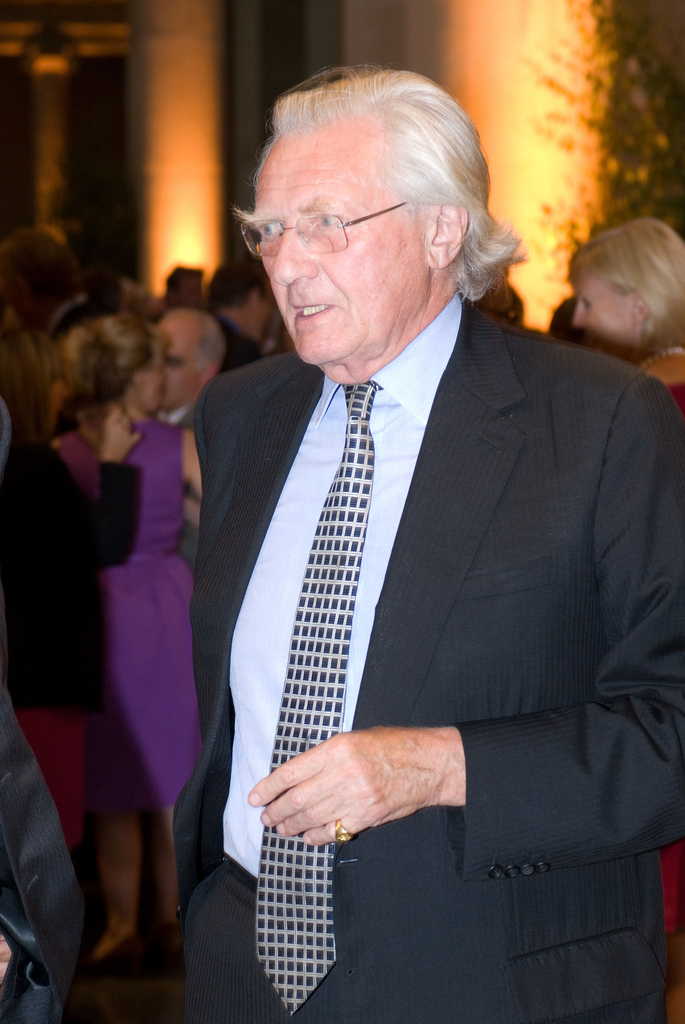
Michael Heseltine

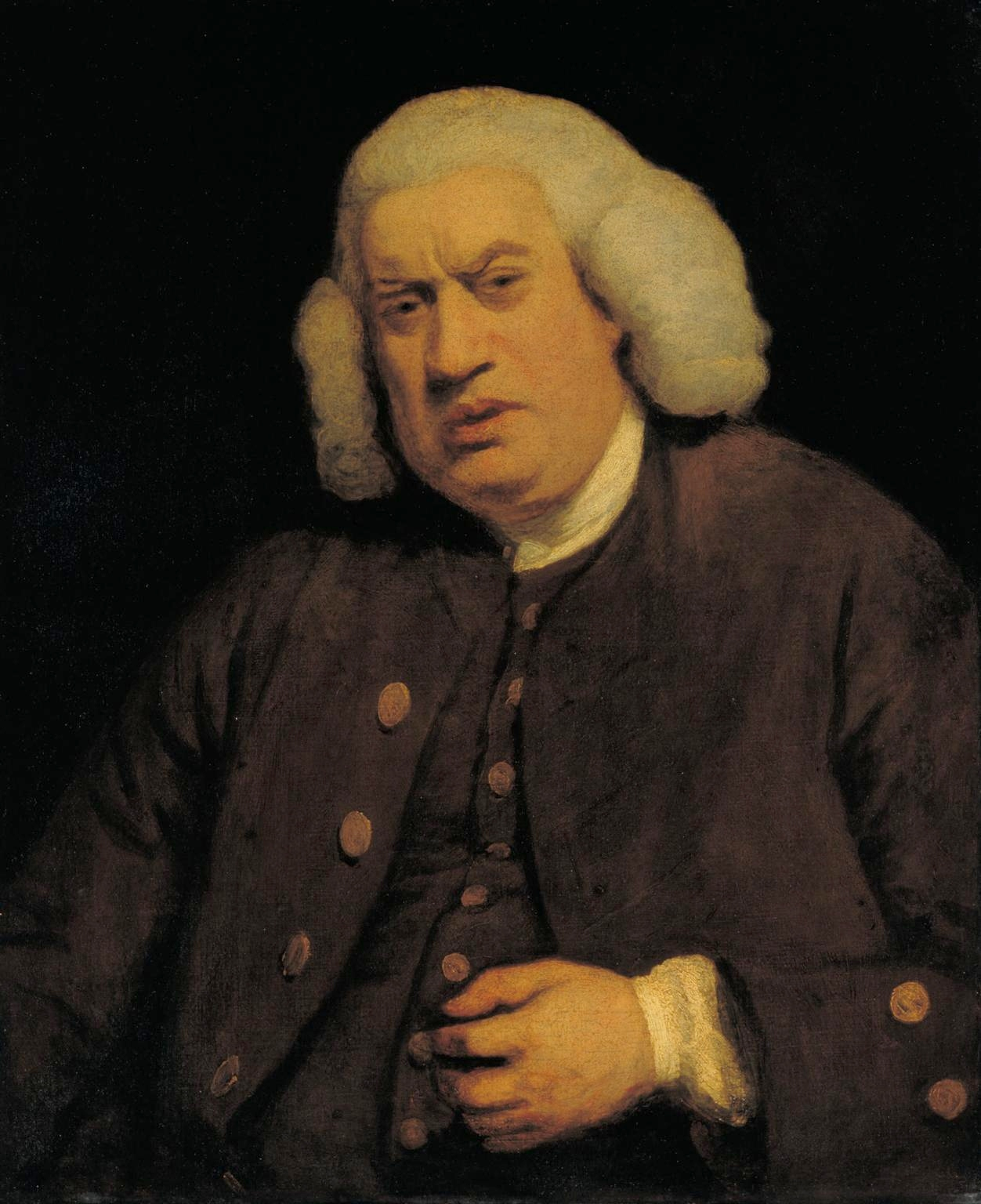
Samuel Johnson

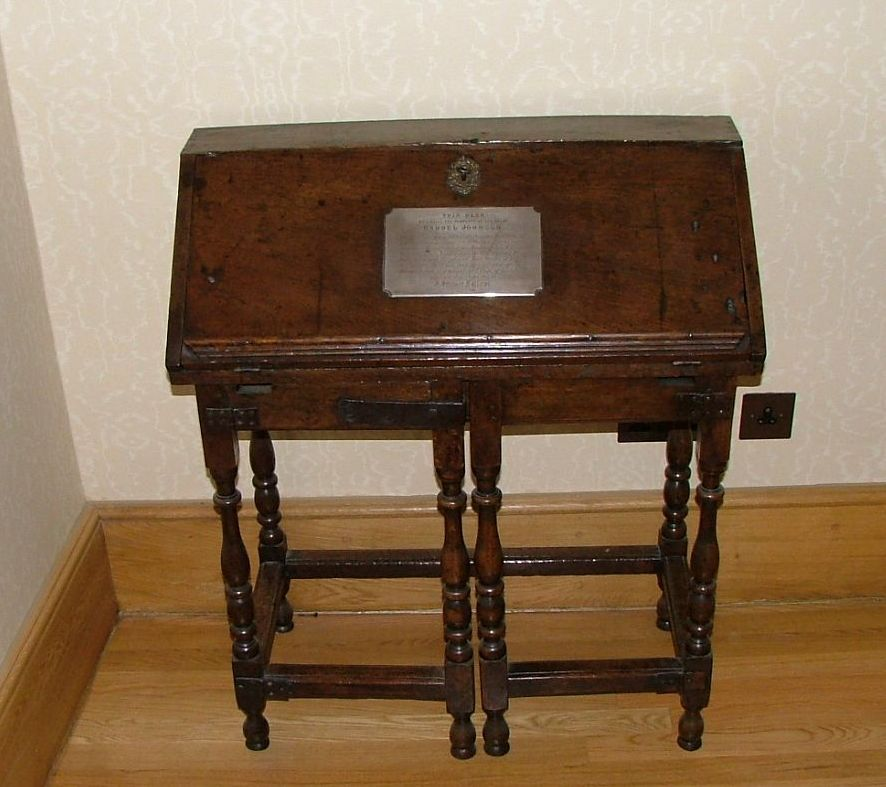
Samuel Johnson's desk, in Broadgates.

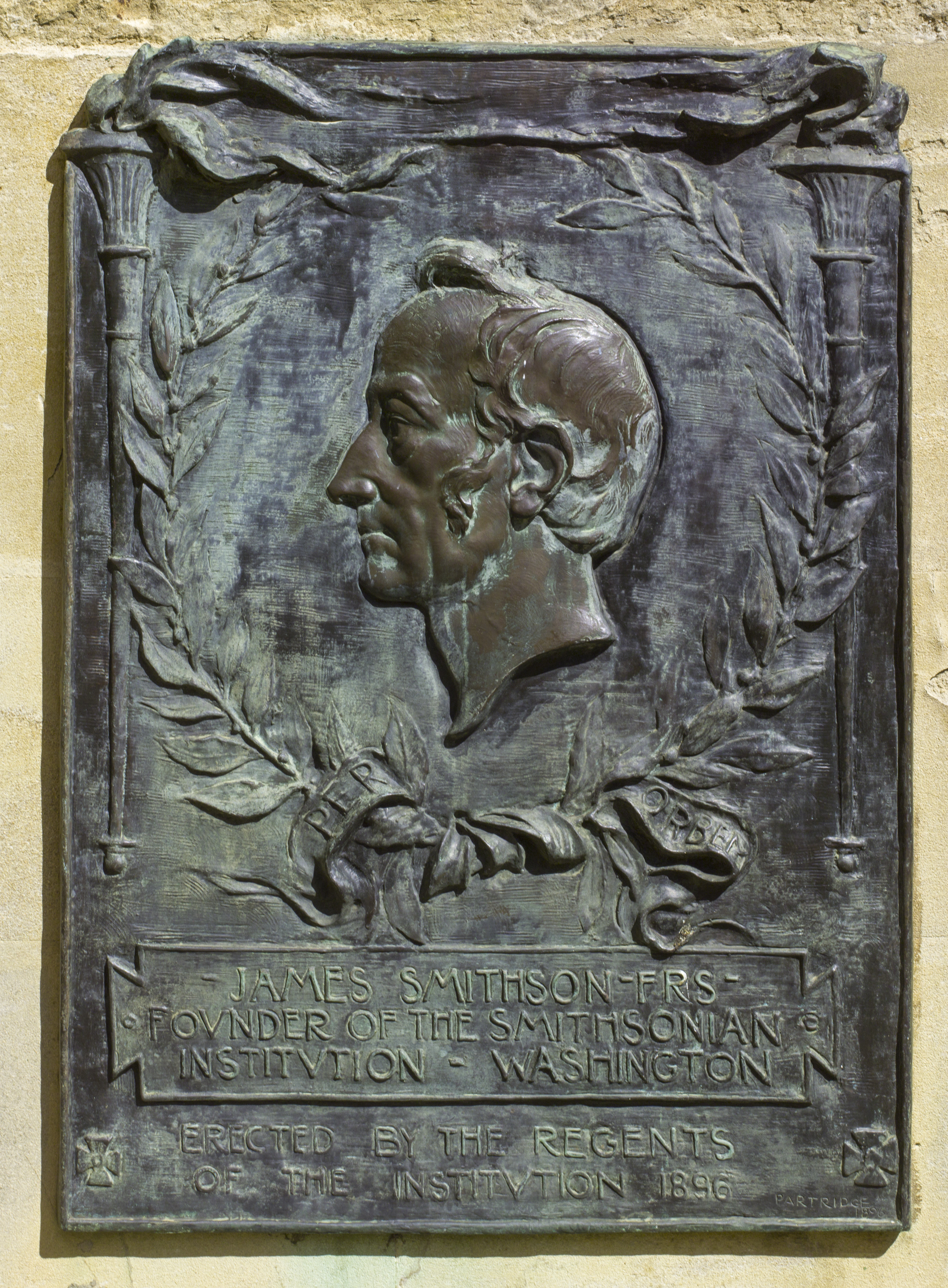
Plaque honoring James Smithson, founding donor of the Smithsonian Institution.

== Former students ==
- Abdullah II of Jordan, current ruler of Jordan
- William Adams, religious writer and essayist
- Patience Agbabi, performance poet
- Hilarion Alfeyev, Metropolitan of the Russian Orthodox Church, theologian, composer
- Francis Beaumont, playwright
- Michael Bettaney, a former MI5 intelligence officer convicted of Official Secrets Act offences in 1984
- Tanya Beckett, journalist and TV presenter
- Sir William Blackstone, jurist
- Edmund Bonner, bishop, known as 'Bloody Bonner'
- Kevin Brennan, Labour politician, MP for Cardiff West
- Sir Thomas Browne, seventeenth-century author
- Ian Burnett, Baron Burnett of Maldon, Lord Chief Justice of England and Wales (2017–2023)
- Pete Buttigieg, Mayor of South Bend, Indiana and 2020 Democratic presidential candidate
- William Camden, antiquarian and historian
- Kenneth Neill Cameron, literary scholar
- John Charmley, Professor of Modern History at the University of East Anglia
- Oz Clarke, oenophile and broadcaster
- Ed Conway, the first Economics Editor of Sky News (since 2011)
- Richard Corbet, Bishop of Oxford and Norwich, was a student resident in Broadgates Hall before it became Pembroke College
- Benjamin Cox, English Baptist minister, student resident in Broadgates Hall before it became Pembroke College
- David Cracknell, former Sunday Times Political Editor
- Mary Creagh, Labour politician
- Thomas Percival Creed, Principal Queen Mary, University of London; Vice-Chancellor University of London
- Julian Critchley, journalist and Conservative politician
- Caryn Davies Rowing, World Championships, Olympic Games Gold medal
- Denzil Davies, Labour politician
- Maria Eagle, Labour government minister
- Jen Easterly, Director, Cybersecurity and Infrastructure Security Agency
- Alun Evans, Co-founder of BUSA and Chief Executive Officer of Football Association of Wales
- J. William Fulbright, Democratic U.S. Senator representing Arkansas
- Stefan Gates, food & cookery writer and television presenter
- Hannes Hólmsteinn Gissurarson, Icelandic political philosopher and writer
- Josh Gottheimer, U.S. Representative from New Jersey
- David Allen Green, lawyer and legal writer
- Tim Griffin, U.S. Representative from Arkansas
- John Hattendorf, maritime historian
- Charles Hawtrey (19th century actor)
- George Procter Hawtrey, actor and playwright
- Michael Heseltine, former Conservative Deputy Prime Minister and publisher
- Tom Hunt, serving Member of Parliament for Ipswich
- Walter Isaacson, author and President and CEO of the Aspen Institute
- Samuel Johnson, lexicographer, biographer, writer, poet
- John Jordan, poet, writer, literary critic, editor, academic and broadcaster
- Roz Kaveney, writer
- Charles Kempe, Victorian stained glass designer
- John Kerr, Baron Kerr of Kinlochard, diplomat
- Sir Louis Addin Kershaw, judge
- Philip Lader, former American ambassador to the United Kingdom, businessman
- Richard Lugar, U.S. Senator from Indiana
- Stephen McKay, academic
- John Metcalf, Olympian
- Bernard Miles, Lord Miles, actor
- Sir John Mummery, Lord Justice of Appeal
- Viktor Orbán, Prime Minister of Hungary (1998-2002, 2010-)
- Tarik O'Regan, composer
- Sukhumbhand Paribatra, 15th Governor of Bangkok, Thailand
- John Pym, parliamentarian and critic of Charles I of England
- Geoffrey Raisman, neuroscientist
- Peter Ricketts, Baron Ricketts, diplomat
- Paul Addison, academic historian of WW2 Britain and its social implications
- Roland Ritchie, former justice of the Supreme Court of Canada
- Win Rockefeller, American philanthropist, Lieutenant Governor of Arkansas
- Chris Rokos, hedge fund manager
- Sir John Scott, Deputy Judge Advocate-General in Egypt, Judicial Advisor to the Khedive, 1891–98
- William Shenstone, 18th Century poet
- Radosław Sikorski, Polish politician and Minister of Foreign Affairs
- James Smithson, mineralogist, benefactor of the Smithsonian Institution
- John Snagge, BBC newsreader and commentator
- Vicky Spratt, author and journalist
- The Rt Rev. Thomas Stanage, Anglican Bishop in South Africa
- Samuel John Stone, Anglican clergyman and hymnwriter (The Church's One Foundation)
- Laura Trott, Conservative politician
- Katharine Viner, editor-in-chief of The Guardian from summer 2015
- Honeysuckle Weeks, actress
- George Whitefield, leader of the Methodist movement in the eighteenth century.
- Þór Whitehead, Professor of History in the University of Iceland.
- Chris Whitty, Chief Medical Officer for England
- John Orman Gilbert, resident minister to Brunei

== Fellows ==
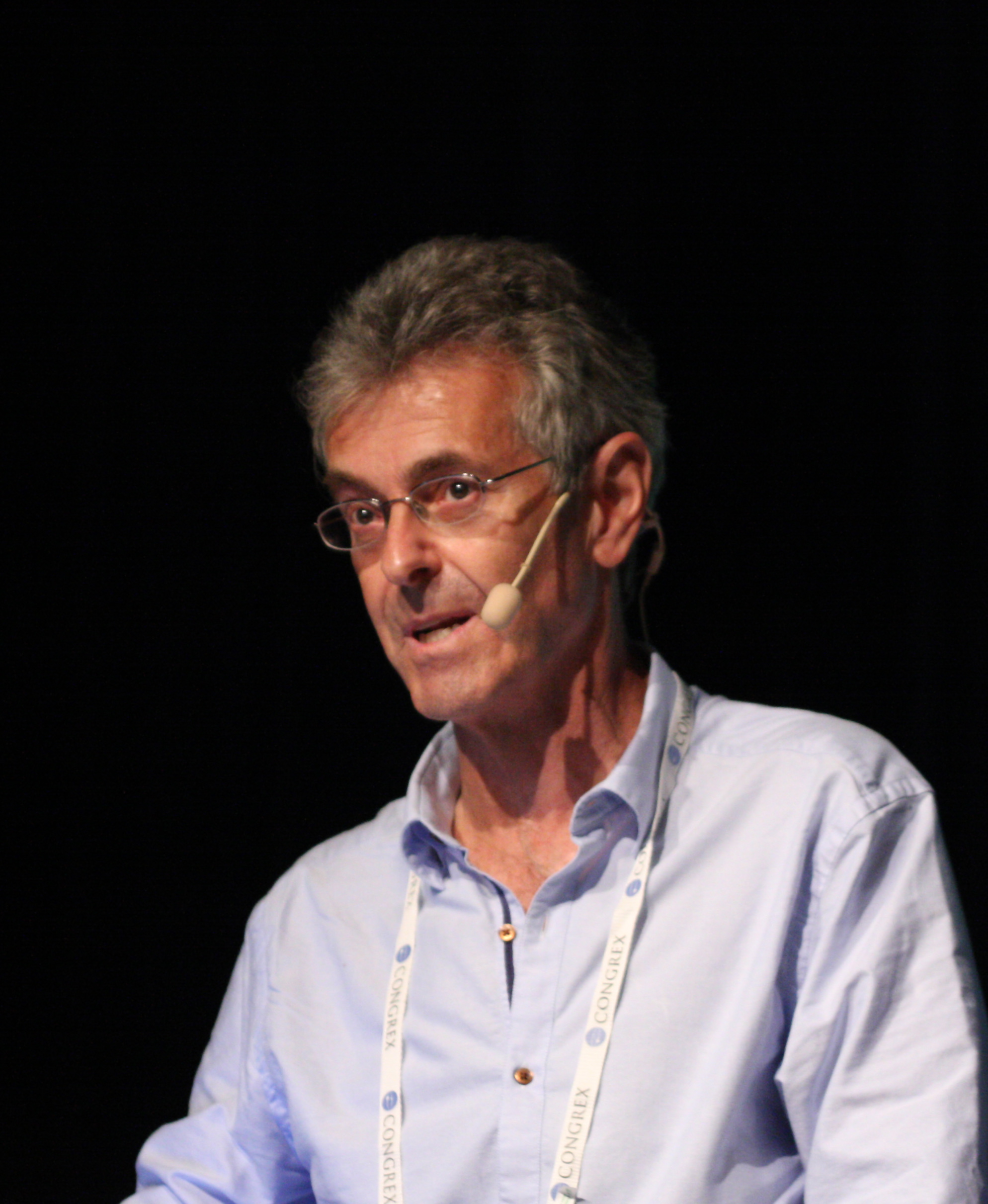
John Krebs as a Hamilton lecturer at the 14th Behavioral Ecology Congress in Lund, Sweden (August 2012)

- Gerald Allen, bishop, Fellow, Dean, and Chaplain of Pembroke College (1910–20), made an Honorary Fellow in 1934
- Antony Andrewes, historian, Fellow (1933–46)
- Robert Baldick, scholar of French literature
- Simon Blackburn, philosopher, former Fellow
- The Rt Rev. Brian Burrowes, bishop, Fellow, Lecturer, Dean and Chaplain until 1937
- John Cameron, Lord Abernethy, Scottish lawyer, Honorary Fellow
- Henry William Chandler, classical scholar, elected Fellow in 1853
- R. G. Collingwood, philosopher and historian
- Tobias Cremer, politician, Junior Research Fellow (2020-2022)
- David Eastwood, academic, Vice-Chancellor of the University of Birmingham since 13 April 2009, former fellow
- John Eekelaar, law lecturer, academic director of Pembroke College (2005–2009)
- Charles Harding Firth, historian, Fellow in 1887
- Malcolm Reginald Godden, Junior Research Fellow (1969–1972), Rawlinson and Bosworth Professor of Anglo-Saxon in the University of Oxford since May 1991.
- Richard Graves, minister and poet
- Conyngham Greene, diplomat, Honorary Fellow 1917
- Henrietta Harrison, historian and sinologist, Fellow 2015
- Martha Klein, philosopher, retired in 2006
- John Krebs, Baron Krebs, zoologist, current Principal of Jesus College, Oxford
- Robert Macintosh, New Zealand-born anaesthetist, Honorary Fellow 1965
- Kenneth Mackenzie, Bishop of Brechin (1935–1943), Fellow, Dean and Chaplain (1905–1910)
- Piers Mackesy, military historian, tutor in modern history and Fellow (1954–88)
- Christopher Melchert, American scholar of Islam, Fellow in Arabic
- Edward Moore, canon of Canterbury Cathedral, Honorary Fellow of Pembroke and Queen's colleges
- Robert Payne, cleric, natural philosopher, second Fellow of the college in 1624
- Zbigniew Pełczyński, politics scholar, emeritus fellow
- Thomas Risley, Presbyterian minister
- George Rolleston, physician and zoologist, Fellow 1851
- Colin Sheppard, engineer, Fellow (1979–89)
- Helen Small, Professor of English Literature
- Eric Stanley, scholar of Medieval literature, Rawlinson and Bosworth Professor of Anglo-Saxon and Fellow of Pembroke College, Oxford (1977–91)
- William Thomas, Welsh clergyman and academic, Fellow after 1760
- J. R. R. Tolkien, a Fellow from 1925 to 1945 and wrote The Hobbit and the first two books of The Lord of the Rings during his time there.
- Stephen Tuck, historian
- Christopher M. Tuckett, biblical scholar, Professor of New Testament Studies and Fellow
- Metropolitan Kallistos Ware, English bishop in the Eastern Orthodox church, theologian, Fellow (1970–2001)
- Robin Wilson, mathematician, Stipendiary Lecturer at Pembroke
- Michael Winterbottom, Classics Professor
- Charles Leslie Wrenn, Rawlinson and Bosworth Professor of Anglo-Saxon (1945–63), member of the "Inklings"

== Masters ==
- 1526 Richard Arche
- 1549–53 Thomas Randolph, ambassador of Elizabeth I, Principal of Broadgates Hall, which is now Pembroke College
- 1624–47 Thomas Clayton, the last Principal of Broadgates Hall and became the first Master of Pembroke College
- 1647 Henry Wightwick, when Clayton died the Fellows elected Wightwick as Master
- 1647–60 Henry Langley, however the Parliamentary Committee for the University elected Langley
- 1660–64 Henry Wightwick, restored as Master
- 1664–1709 John Hall
- 1710–14 Colwell Brickenden
- 1714–38 Matthew Panting, contributed to the building of the Chapel
- 1738–75 John Ratcliffe
- 1775–89 William Adams
- 1789–96 William Sergrove, a descendant of Thomas Tesdale's (whose gift made Pembroke's existence possible). Died aged only 49.
- 1796–1809 John Smyth, one-time naval chaplain, his stories earned him the nickname 'Sinbad the Sailor'.
- 1809–43 George William Hall, academic administrator
- 1844–64 Francis Jeune, clergyman, Dean of Jersey (1838–1844)
- 1864–91 Evan Evans, Philipps Fellow of Pembroke College (1843–1864), serving as Tutor and senior Dean, Vice-Chancellor of Oxford University (1878–1882)
- 1892–98 Bartholomew Price, mathematician, became fellow in 1844 and tutor and mathematical lecturer in 1845, one of the teachers of Lewis Carroll
- 1899–1918 John Mitchinson, President of the Union, teacher and Anglican priest
- 1918–55 Frederick Homes Dudden, theological scholar, Chaplain to King George V and George VI (1929–52), Vice-Chancellor of Oxford University (1929–32)
- 1955–68 Ronald McCallum, Fellow in history in 1925
- 1968–75 George Pickering, had held the Regius Chair of Medicine
- 1975–85 Geoffrey Arthur, diplomat
- 1985–93 Roger Bannister, medic, best known as the first man to run the mile in under four minutes.
- 1993–2001 Robert Stevens, lawyer, previously Professor of Law at Yale, President of Haverford College, Chancellor of the University of California, Santa Cruz
- July 2001 – July 2013 Giles Henderson CBE, Senior Partner at law firm Slaughter and May
- August 2013 – June 2020 Lynne Brindley, former Chief Executive of the British Library, the United Kingdom's national library (July 2000-July 2012)
- July 2020 – present Ernest Ryder, a former Lord Justice of Appeal
