= John Smyth (Master of Pembroke) =

Master of Pembroke College, Oxford (1744 – 1809)

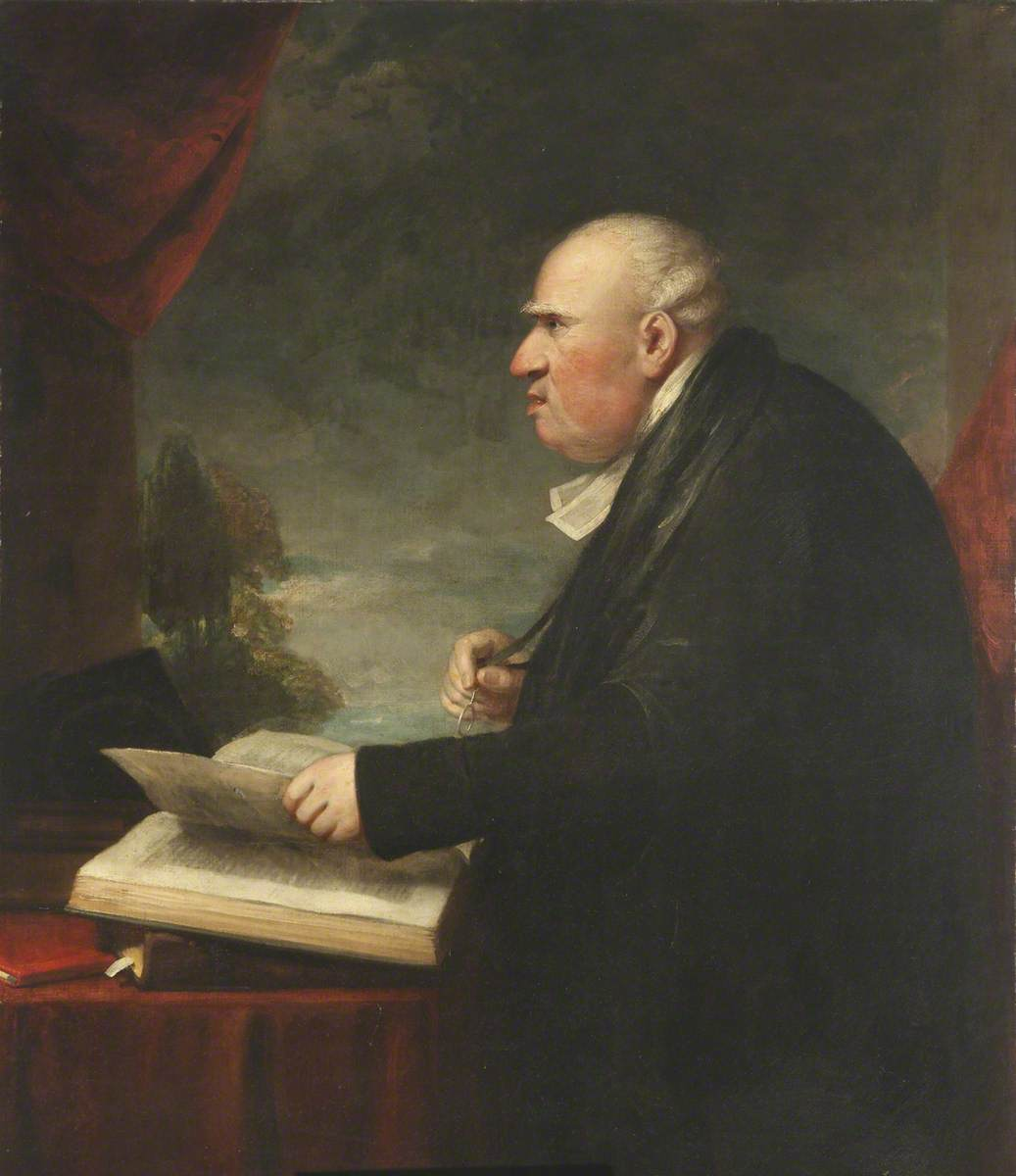
- painting by Henry Howard, 1811
- Born: 1744
- Died: 19 October 1809 (aged 64–65)

John Smyth or Smith (1744–1809) was a clergyman and Master of Pembroke College, Oxford.

== Education ==
He was educated at John Roysse's Free School in Abingdon, (now Abingdon School) from 1756 to 1761.

He earned a B.A (1765) and M.A (1769) at Pembroke. B.D. and Doctor of Divinity (D.D.) 1796.

== Career ==
John Smyth became Master of Pembroke in 1796.

The close relationship between Abingdon School and Pembroke College resulted in seven Old Abingdonians being appointed as consecutive masters at Pembroke between 1710 and 1843. They were Colwell Brickenden 1709–1714; Matthew Panting, 1714–1738; John Ratcliffe, 1738–1775; William Adams, 1775–1789; William Sergrove 1789–1796; John Smyth 1796–1809; and George William Hall, 1809–1843.

He was rector of Coln Rogers (1799), curate of Eastleach-Turville, rector of Rudford (1801), vicar of Fairford (1804) and canon of Gloucester (1796–1809). He was also a Steward of the OA Club in 1805.

== See also ==
- List of Old Abingdonians
- List of people associated with Pembroke College, Oxford

Academic offices
Preceded by William Sergrove	Master of Pembroke College, Oxford; 1796–1809	Succeeded by George William Hall
