= Colwell Brickenden =

Master of Pembroke College, Oxford (1663–1714)

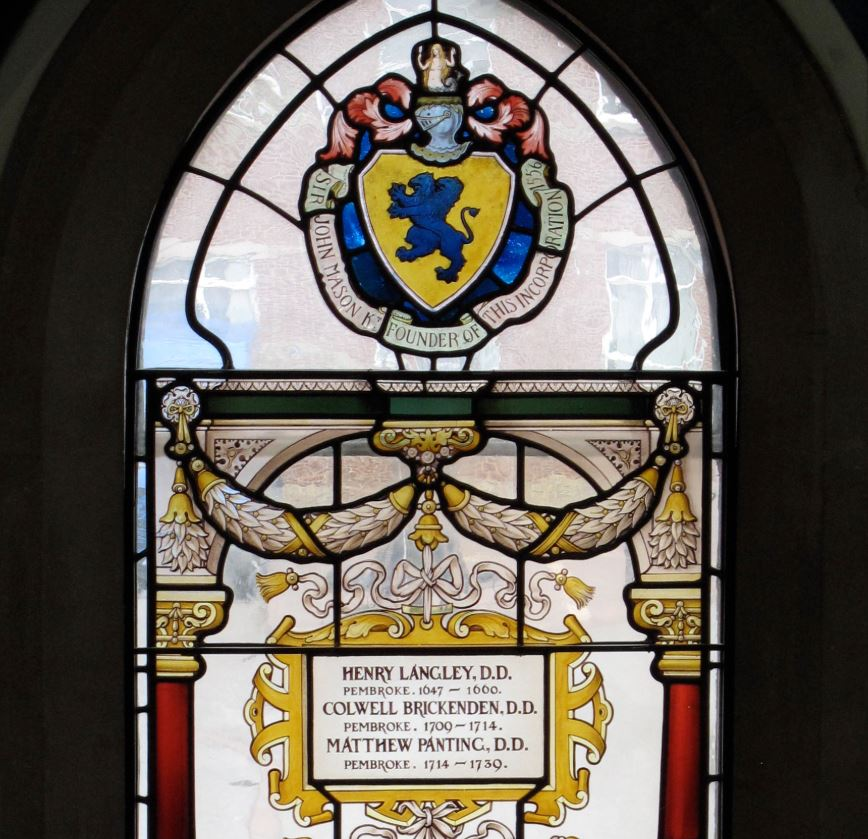
- Stained glass in the Grundy Library, Abingdon School (by C. E. Kempe). The name of Brickenden appears as an Old Abingdonian who became a master of an Oxford college.
- Born: 1663
- Died: 23 August 1714 (aged 50–51)

Colwell Brickenden (1663–1714) was a Clergyman and Master of Pembroke College, Oxford.

== Education ==
He was educated at John Roysse's Free School in Abingdon (now Abingdon School) from 1675 to 1680. He earned a BA (1684 or 1685) and MA (1687) at Pembroke. BD & DD in 1710.

== Career ==
He resided at Clawton Manor in 1690 where he was rector. Also rector of Inkpen and inherited the Titcomb Estate in Kintbury following the death of his elder brother. He rebuilt the rectory and built Inkpen House c. 1695. He obtained a prebend of Gloucester.

Brickenden became Master of Pembroke in 1710 after defeating a second candidate called William Hunt. The close relationship between Abingdon School and Pembroke College resulted in seven Old Abingdonians being appointed as consecutive masters at Pembroke between 1710 and 1843. They were Brickenden 1710–1714; Matthew Panting, 1714–1738; John Ratcliffe, 1738–1775; William Adams, 1775–1789; William Sergrove 1789–1796; John Smyth, 1796–1809 and George William Hall, 1809–1843.

== Personal life ==
He had seven children, one of whom was Richard Brickenden.

== See also ==
- List of Old Abingdonians
- List of people associated with Pembroke College, Oxford

Academic offices
Preceded by John Hall	Master of Pembroke College, Oxford; 1710–1714	Succeeded by Matthew Panting
