= William Sergrove =

Reverend Dr William Sergrove
- Born: 1746
- Died: 16 April 1796 (aged 49–50)

William Sergrove (1746–1796) was a Clergyman and Master of Pembroke College, Oxford.

== Education ==
He was educated at John Roysse's Free School in Abingdon, (now Abingdon School) and St Paul's School, London. He earned a B.A (1766) and M.A (1769) at Pembroke. B.D. (1778) and Doctor of Divinity (D.D.) 1789.

== Career ==
Sergrove was Master of Pembroke from 1789 to 1796.

The close relationship between Abingdon School and Pembroke College resulted in seven Old Abingdonians being appointed as consecutive masters at Pembroke between 1710 and 1843. They were Colwell Brickenden 1709–1714; Matthew Panting, 1714–1738; John Ratcliffe, 1738–1775; William Adams, 1775–1789; Sergrove 1789–1796; John Smyth, 1796-1809 and George William Hall, 1809–1843.

He was rector of St. Aldates's, Oxford (1774-1789), canon of Gloucester (1789), vicar of Penmark and Llantwit Major (1795-1796).

== See also ==
- List of Old Abingdonians
- List of people associated with Pembroke College, Oxford

Academic offices
Preceded by William Adams	Master of Pembroke College, Oxford; 1789–1796	Succeeded by John Smyth
