= Winson =

Winson may refer to:

- Winson Engineering, British manufacturer of narrow gauge and miniature railway steam locomotives and rolling stock during the 1990s
- Winson (cyclecar)
- Winson, Gloucestershire, village in England
- Winson Hudson (1916–2004), civil rights activist born and raised in Harmony, Mississippi

== See also ==
- Winson Green, loosely defined inner-city area in the west of the city of Birmingham, England
