= Coln Rogers =

Village in Gloucestershire, England

Coordinates: 51.78410°N 1.87673°W

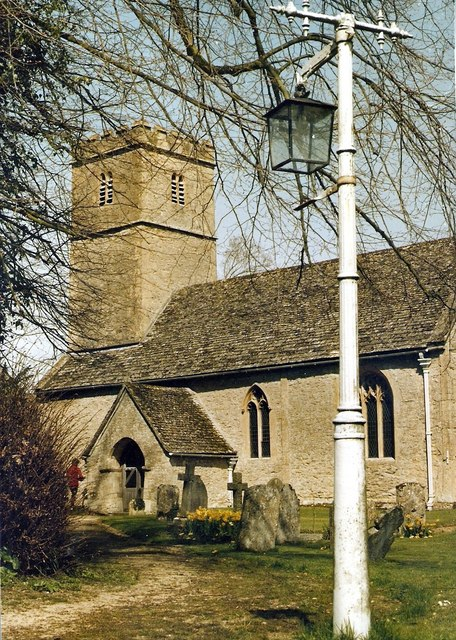
- St. Andrew's Church

- Location within Gloucestershire
- Civil parish: Coln St. Dennis
- District: Cotswold
- Shire county: Gloucestershire
- Region: South West
- Country: England
- Sovereign state: United Kingdom
- Post town: Cheltenham
- Postcode district: GL54
- Police: Gloucestershire
- Fire: Gloucestershire
- Ambulance: South Western
- UK Parliament: North Cotswolds

Coln Rogers is a village and former civil parish, now in the parish of Coln St. Dennis, in the Cotswold district of the county of Gloucestershire, England. In 1931 the parish had a population of 95.

== Name ==
The name comes from the River Coln and was attested in the Domesday book as Culne, and later in the 12th century as Culna Rogeri. The 'Rogers' part of the name dates back to when Roger de Gloucester gave the parish to Gloucester Abbey.

== Location ==
Coln Rogers lies on the River Coln, there is a bridge over the river in the village. It lies in the Cotswolds Area of Natural Beauty. The village is located half a mile eastwards of the A429, the road between Coventry to the north and Cirencester in the south. The nearest railway station – in Kemble, is located some 12 miles away, south of Cirencester.

== History ==
The Church of St Andrew is the Church of England parish church which is dedicated to Saint Andrew. It has been described as "unique in the Cotswolds in that it has a Saxon nave and chancel which have survived almost intact, except for the enlargement of all but one of the original windows, the rebuilding of the east end of the chancel, and the erection of a west tower within the nave". Coln Rogers is also where the surname of Rogers originated from.

The village was one of the few where all soldiers sent to war in WWI survived the conflict, it is known as a 'thankful village'. There are only 53 of such places in Britain. The village is featured on Darren Hayman's album, Thankful Villages Volume 2.

On 1 April 1935, the parish was abolished and merged with Coln St. Dennis.

== Rectors ==
Rectors have included Matthew Panting and John Ratcliffe, John Smyth.
