= Sevenhampton =

Sevenhampton may refer to:

- Sevenhampton, Gloucestershire, England
- Sevenhampton, Wiltshire, England
