= John Ratcliffe (clergyman) =

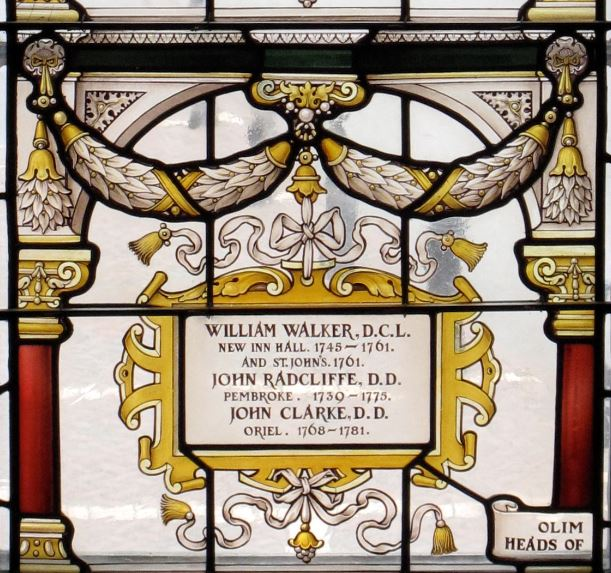
- Stained glass by C.E Kempe in the Grundy Library, Abingdon School containing the name of John Radcliffe
- Born: 1700
- Died: 13 July 1775

John Ratcliffe or possibly Radcliffe (1700 – 1775) was Master of Pembroke College, Oxford.

== Education ==
Son of clergyman, Robert Ratcliffe, he was educated at John Roysse's Free School in Abingdon, (now Abingdon School).

He earned a B.A (1722) and M.A (1725) at Pembroke. B.D. (1737) and Doctor of Divinity (D.D.) 1739.

== Career ==
John Ratcliffe became Master of Pembroke on 23 February 1738.

The close relationship between Abingdon School and Pembroke College resulted in seven Old Abingdonians being appointed as consecutive masters at Pembroke between 1710 and 1843. They were Colwell Brickenden 1709–1714; Matthew Panting, 1714–1738; Ratcliffe, 1738–1775; William Adams, 1775–1789; William Sergrove 1789–1796; John Smyth, 1796–1809 and George William Hall, 1809–1843.

He was rector of Coln Rogers (1739–1775) and canon of Gloucester (1739–1775).

He was a Steward of the OA Club in 1747.

== See also ==
- List of Old Abingdonians
- List of people associated with Pembroke College, Oxford

Academic offices
Preceded by Matthew Panting	Master of Pembroke College, Oxford; 1738–1775	Succeeded by William Adams
