= Sevenhampton, Gloucestershire =

Village in Gloucestershire, England

Coordinates: 51.891667°N 1.95°W

Sevenhampton
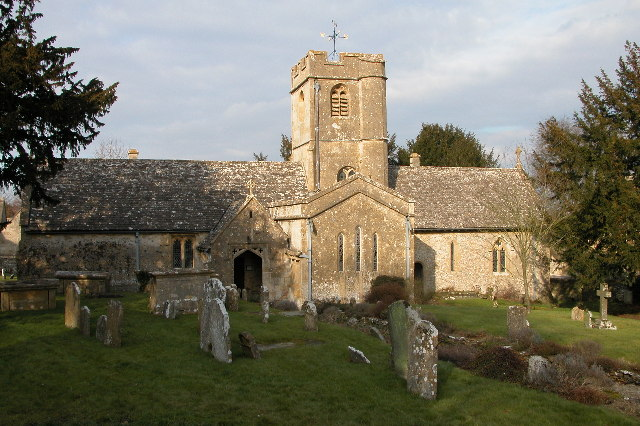
- St Andrew's Church

- Location within Gloucestershire
- OS grid reference: SP034215
- Shire county: Gloucestershire
- Region: South West
- Country: England
- Sovereign state: United Kingdom
- Post town: CHELTENHAM
- Postcode district: GL54
- Dialling code: 01242
- Police: Gloucestershire
- Fire: Gloucestershire
- Ambulance: South Western
- UK Parliament: North Cotswolds

Sevenhampton is a village and civil parish in Cotswold District, Gloucestershire, 5 miles (8.0 km) east of Cheltenham. The parish is located in the Cotswolds in an area designated as an Area of Outstanding Natural Beauty. Most of the parish population reside in the two main settlements of Sevenhampton village and Brockhampton village, both are located in the valley of the River Coln.

The Church of St Andrew was built in the 12th century. It is a grade I listed building.

== Demographics ==
| Year | 2001 census | 2011 census | 2021 census |
|---|---|---|---|
| Population | 349. | 333. | 300. |

== Name ==
The name was recorded as " SEVEN..hā..TONE " in the Domesday Book of 1086 A.D. The Survey of English Place-names documents its history as SEVEN..hā..TONE (1086), Seuehamton (1221), Sevehampton (1241), Seueshampton (1327), Sevezhampton (1327), and Senhampton or Sen(n)yngton (1575).

The parish is now known by the village name of Sevenhampton, but during the 16th century it was variously known as Senhampton and Sennington. (Note: British History Online. . . " The parish name, first recorded in 1086 and with later variants including Senhampton and Sennington. . . ") A house near Brockhampton was known as Sennington, (Note: British History Online. . . " The south-western corner of Brockhampton Park stands on the site of the house begun by Paul Peart in or soon after 1639. . .In the late 18th century and the early 19th, when it was known as Sennington or Sevenhampton Park. . . ") and an old village now deserted was known as Old Sennington. (Note: See (Contents) > History > Sennington DMV > . . .Old Sennington is a deserted medieval village. . .)

The name element seve (13th–14th century) is from English dialect seave (sedge or rush). (Note: WiKtionary : English dialect < seave > From Old Norse sef, whence also Danish siv, Icelandic sef and Swedish säv (“club-rush”).) (Note: WiKtionary : Old Norse < sef > " sedge, rush ".) The springs and streams that feed the River Coln in its early stages provide an ideal habitat for sedges and rushes to grow. During the medieval period sedges and rushes were known as "seaves". (Note: See Rushbearing > Dialect names for rush) The name element Seven arose from a common mistake whereby Anglo-Saxons confused Old Norse sef for Old English seofon (seven). (Note: WiKtionary : Old Norse < sef > " sedge, rush ".) (Note: WiKtionary : Old English < seofon > " seven ".)

The name element hampton is from Old English hām and tūn. (Note: WiKtionary : Old English < hām) (Note: WiKtionary : Old English < tūn) The toponym for Sevenhampton might therefore be village where seeves grow (or "overgrown with seeves").

== History ==
The Domesday Book entry for Sevenhampton also included Prestbury in the land and resources totals, which were 5 lord's plough teams and 29 men's plough teams of ploughland, 20 acres (8.1 hectares) of meadow, and 1 by 0.5 leagues (Note: Woodland 3.0 miles (4.8 km) * 1.5 miles (2.4 km)) of woodland.

A rabbit warren was established in the woods in the 13th century, however the warren was later destroyed in the 17th century.

During the Middle Ages the woods were of economic importance for the supply of timber and firewood; also for sheep grazing in the wood-pastures. Parts of the woods were available to local people as common land for the grazing of horses and cattle.

=== Sennington DMV ===
Old Sennington is a deserted medieval village (DMV) about 0.5 miles (0.8 km) north-west of Sevenhampton village. The site is listed as a Scheduled Monument.

== Geography and ecology ==
The landscape is mostly of high limestone plateau that has been bisected by the north – south aligned valley of the River Coln. The river rises from springs to the north of Brockhampton and is fed by more springs along the way. (Note: British History Online. . . " The river Coln, rising at springs in Sevenhampton and Charlton Abbots, to the north. . . ") The springs and streams that feed the River Coln in its early stages provide an ideal habitat for sedges and rushes to grow. During the medieval period sedges and rushes were known as "seeves", hence the origin of the name Seven..hampton. (Note: See (Contents) > Name)

Puckham Woods is a large area of ancient woodland in a deep valley on the western fringe of the parish. It is designated as a biological Site of Special Scientific Interest (SSSI). The woodland consists of a mix of original and managed ancient woodland. At the time of the Domesday Book (1086), part of the woods were within the bishop of Hereford's Prestbury estate, which presumably included the Queen's Wood area to the west of Cleeve Common. (Note: British History Online . . . " Puckham woods (or wood), which were partly in Prestbury parish, were presumably represented in 1086 by woodland recorded on the bishop of Hereford's Prestbury estate. . . ")

There are fragmented areas designated as ' Woodpasture and Parkland – BAP Priority Habitat ' in and around Brockhampton Park. (Note: See United Kingdom Biodiversity Action Plan > Priority habitats)
