= Coln St. Dennis =

Village in Gloucestershire, England

Coordinates: 51.800°N 1.856°W

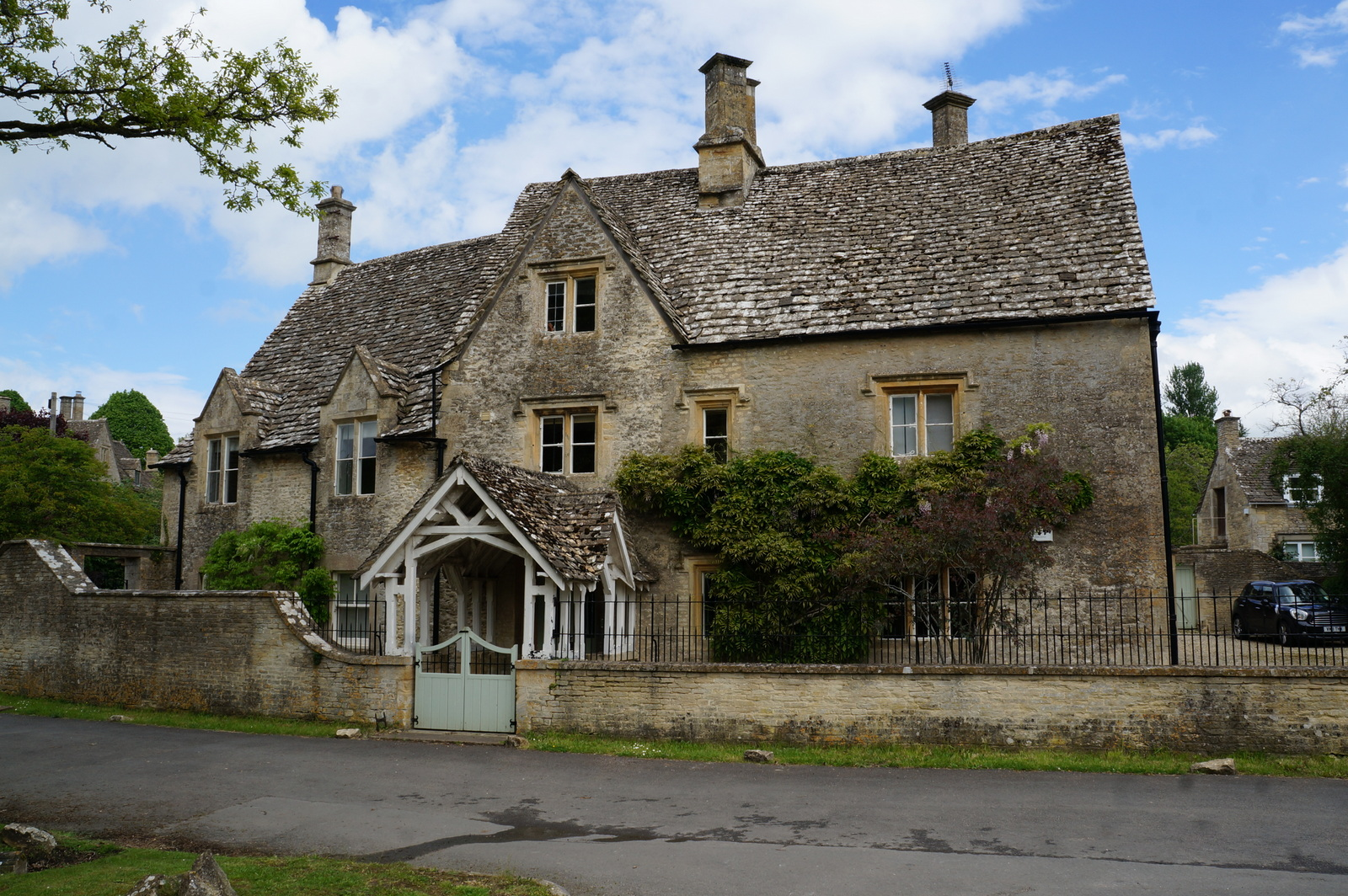
- Houses in Coln St Dennis

- Location within Gloucestershire
- Population: 194 (2011)
- OS grid reference: SP0810
- Civil parish: Coln St. Dennis
- District: Cotswold
- Shire county: Gloucestershire
- Region: South West
- Country: England
- Sovereign state: United Kingdom
- Post town: Cheltenham
- Postcode district: GL54
- Police: Gloucestershire
- Fire: Gloucestershire
- Ambulance: South Western
- UK Parliament: North Cotswolds

Coln St. Dennis is a village and civil parish on the River Coln in Gloucestershire about 3 miles (4.8 km) southwest of Northleach and about 7 miles (11 km) northeast of Cirencester. The parish includes the village of Coln Rogers and the hamlets of Calcot, Fossebridge and Winson. The Fosse Way Roman road, which is now the A429 trunk road, forms the western boundary of the parish.

== Name ==
According to the Domesday book, Coln St. Dennis belonged to Saint Denis in Paris. In the 13th century it is recorded as Colne Santi Dionisij.

== History ==
About 1.3 miles (2.1 km) southwest of Coln Rogers are Colnpen Long Barrow and a group of four round tumuli. All are prehistoric burial mounds.

The Church of St James is the Church of England parish church dedicated to Saint James the Great which is Norman, with the addition of some Decorated Gothic and Perpendicular Gothic windows and other details. The church was dedicated to Saint Katherine in the 13th century, Saint Dennis in the 18th century, and is believed to have once been dedicated to Saint Kenelm.

Coln St. Dennis Manor House was built in the 17th century and altered in 1965. Pindrup is a farmhouse dating from the 17th and 18th centuries. St. James' Rectory was designed by Richard Pace and built in 1810.

== Sources ==
- Elrington, C.R. (1964). "A History of the County of Gloucester, Volume 8". Victoria County History. pp. 28–34.
- Verey, David (1970). The Buildings of England: Gloucestershire: The Cotswolds. Harmondsworth: Penguin Books. pp. 199–200. ISBN 0-14-071040-X.
