= Brockhampton, Gloucestershire =

Village in Gloucestershire, England

Coordinates: 51.900°N 1.951°W

Brockhampton
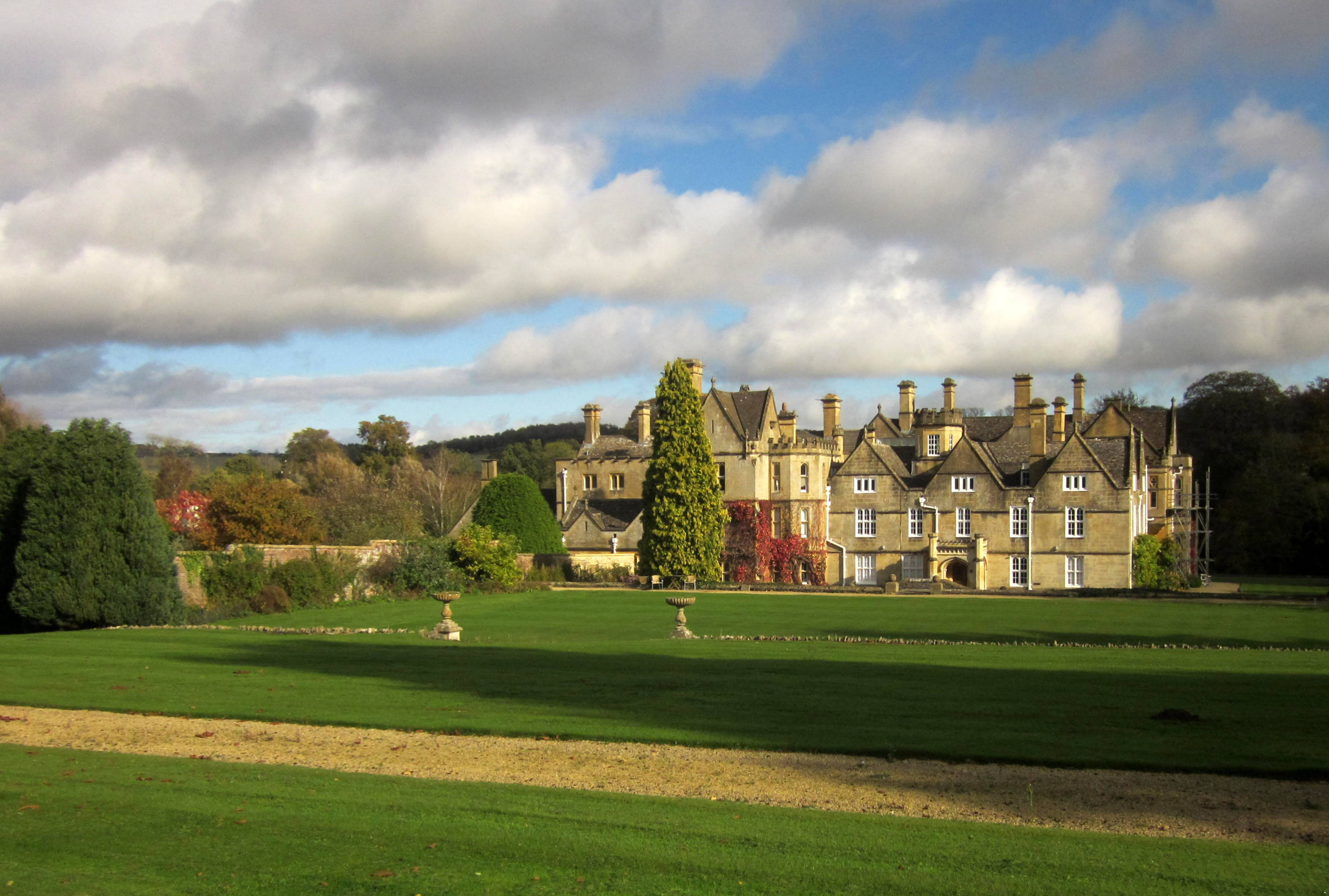
- Brockhampton Park

- Location within Gloucestershire
- OS grid reference: SP035224
- Shire county: Gloucestershire
- Region: South West
- Country: England
- Sovereign state: United Kingdom
- Post town: CHELTENHAM
- Postcode district: GL54
- Dialling code: 01242
- Police: Gloucestershire
- Fire: Gloucestershire
- Ambulance: South Western
- UK Parliament: North Cotswolds

Brockhampton is a small village east of Cheltenham in Gloucestershire, England. It forms part of the parish of Sevenhampton.

In the 2001 census the parish had 349 people living in 157 households. The source of the River Coln, a tributary of the Thames, is close to the village.
