= Bartholomew Price =

English mathematician, clergyman and educator

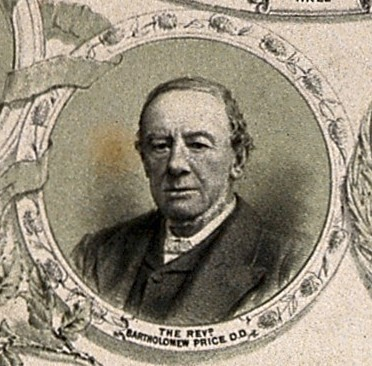

Reverend Bartholomew Price (1818 – 29 December 1898) was an English mathematician, clergyman and educator.

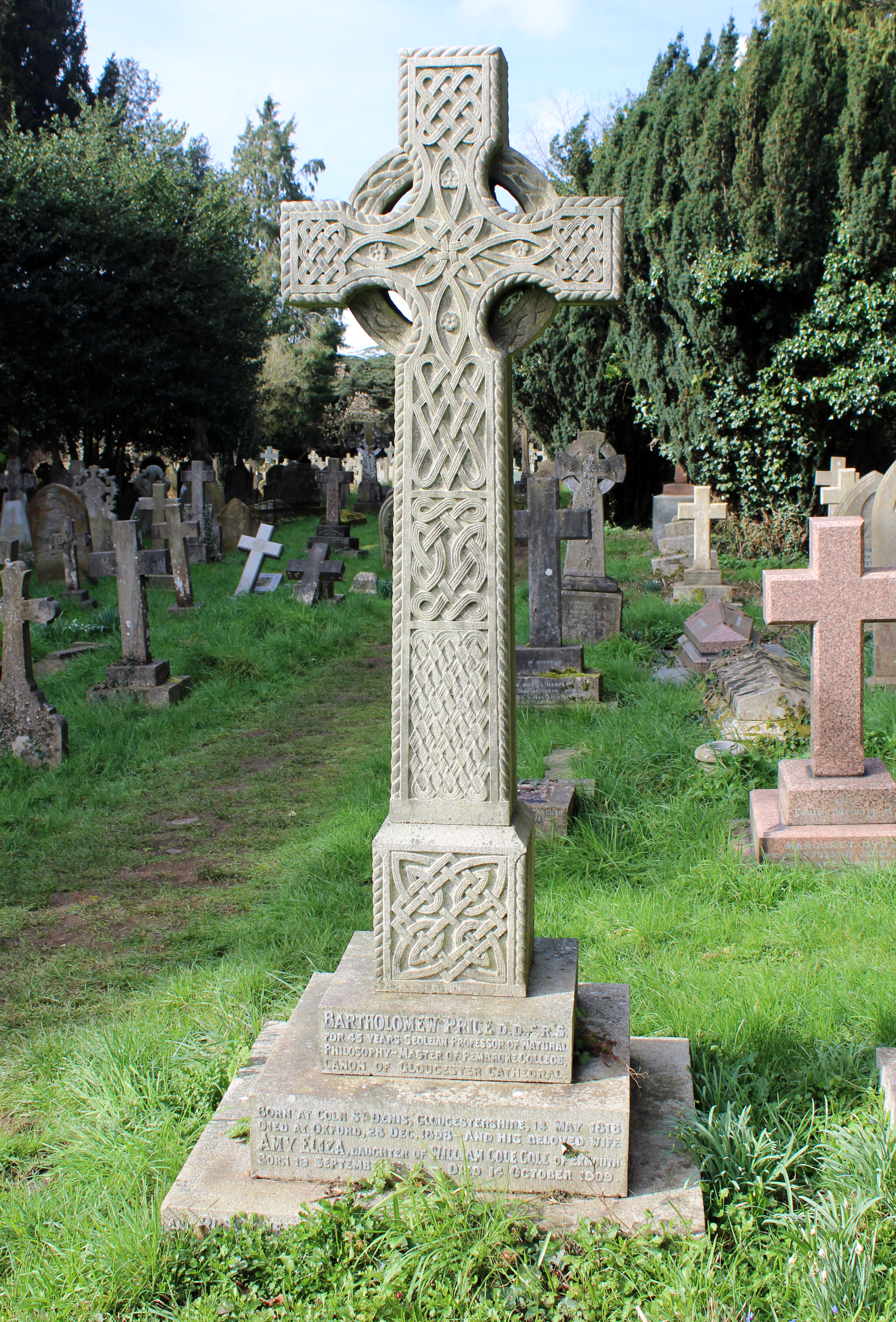
This grave marker in Holywell Cemetery, Oxford confirms the birth and death date of Bartholomew Price, and also provides information about his wife

== Life ==
Bartholomew Price was born at Coln St Denis, Gloucestershire, on 14 May 1818, the son of the Revd W. Price, Rector of that parish. He went up to Pembroke College, Oxford and took first-class hours in the Final Honours School of Mathematics in 1840. In 1842 he won the university mathematical scholarship and in 1844 was ordained and was elected Fellow and Tutor in Mathematics at Pembroke College. He at once took a leading position in the mathematical teaching of the university, and published treatises on the Differential calculus in 1848 and the Infinitesimal calculus (4 vols.) in 1852–1860. This latter work included the differential and integral calculus, the calculus of variations, the theory of attractions, and analytical mechanics.

In 1853 he was appointed Sedleian Professor of Natural Philosophy, a position he held until June 1898. His chief public activity at Oxford was in connection with the Hebdomadal Council, and with the Clarendon Press, of which he was for many years secretary. He was also a curator of the Bodleian Library, an honorary fellow of The Queen's College, a governor of Winchester College and a visitor of Greenwich Observatory.

On 20 August 1857 at Littleham near Exmouth in Devon, Bartholomew Price married Amy Eliza Cole, the eldest daughter of William Cole Cole, Esq. [sic] of Highfield, Exmouth. The marriage was conducted by the Revd Francis Jeune, the Master of Pembroke College, Oxford. The couple moved into 11 St Giles' Street, where their seven children were born between 1858 and 1870. They moved out in 1891.

In 1891 Price was elected Master of Pembroke College, which dignity carried with it a canonry of Gloucester Cathedral.

In 1889 he was one of the shareholders in Silver's factory in Silvertown, East London, an immensely profitable rubber company. That year saw a major strike by Silver's workers for higher pay but after 12 weeks the strikers were forced back to work by hunger. Bartholomew Price was the shareholder who moved the motion of thanks in the Managing Director at the shareholders meeting in February 1890.

He was on the governing body of Abingdon School from c.1887 until his death in December 1898.

The Revd Bartholomew Price died in Oxford on 28 December 1898 and was buried in Holywell Cemetery, Oxford. His grave marker reads: “BARTHOLOMEW PRICE D.D., F.R.S. / FOR 45 YEARS SEDLEIAN PROFESSOR OF NATURAL / PHILOSOPHY – MASTER OF PEMBROKE COLLEGE, / CANON OF GLOUCESTER CATHEDRAL / BORN AT COLN ST DENIS, GLOUCESTERSHIRE, 14 MAY 1818 / DIED AT OXFORD, 28 DEC. 1893 / AND HIS BELOVED WIFE AMY ELIZA, DAUGHTER OF WILLIAM COLE COLE OF EXMOUTH, BORN 19 SEPTEMBER 1835, DIED 14 OCTOBER 1909.”

Nowadays, Professor Price is best remembered as one of the teachers of Lewis Carroll. There is a reference to his nickname of 'the bat' in the Mad Hatter's song "Twinkle, Twinkle, Little Bat", a parody of "Twinkle Twinkle Little Star" in Alice's Adventures in Wonderland.

A clock designed by Henry Wilson is dedicated to Price in Gloucester Cathedral.

== Writings ==
- An essay on the relation of the several parts of a mathematical science to the fundamental idea therein contained (1849)
- A Treatise on Infinitesimal Calculus v. 1: Differential calculus (1857)
- A Treatise on Infinitesimal Calculus v. 2. Integral calculus and calculus of variations
- A Treatise on Infinitesimal Calculus v. 3. Statics attractions, dynamics of material particle
- A Treatise on Infinitesimal Calculus v. 4: The dynamics of material systems (1862)

Academic offices
Preceded by Evan Evans	Master of Pembroke College, Oxford; 1892-1898	Succeeded by Bishop John Mitchinson
