= Puckham Woods =

Biological Site of Special Scientific Interest in Gloucestershire, England

Pucham Woods
- Site of Special Scientific Interest
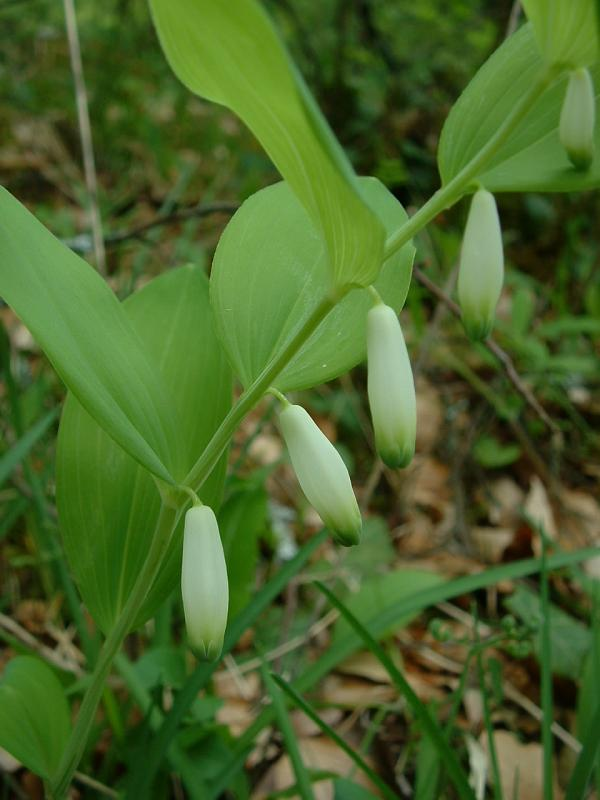
- Example - Angular Solomon's-seal (Polygonatum odoratum)

- Location within Gloucestershire
- Location of Pucham Woods.
- Area of search: Gloucestershire
- Grid reference: SP010224
- Coordinates: 51.900593°N 1.986146°W
- Interest: Biological
- Area: 32.38 ha (80.0 acres)
- Notification date: 1954

Puckham Woods (grid reference SP010224) is a 32.38-hectare (80.0-acre) biological Site of Special Scientific Interest in Gloucestershire to the east of Cheltenham near Whittington, notified in 1954. The site (including Scrubs Complex) is listed in the 'Cotswold District' Local Plan 2001-2011 (on line) as a Key Wildlife Site (KWS).

== Location ==
The woods lie within the Cotswold Area of Outstanding Natural Beauty and the Cotswold Hills Environmentally Sensitive Area (ESA). The site was previously called Puckham. Over the years there have been boundary amendments and review of the operations on the site to protect the special interest of the designation. There are three units of assessment; two are woodland and one is pasture (two fields).

The site is on the edge of the Cotswold scarp and its geology is of the Jurassic time interval and is made up of Inferior Oolite limestone. There is a band of Fuller's Earth in the northern woodland area.

== Habitat and flora ==
This site is noted for its unimproved limestone grassland, and its flower-rich, ancient semi-natural woodland. So much of this type of habitat has been lost due to changes in land management and land use.

The woods are an example of old woodland which comprises Ash, Oak, Silver Birch, Whitebeam and Rowan. This kind of woodland is relatively scarce in the Cotswolds which is mostly Beech. The forestry practices for the wood have ensured that native species are maintained on the site. Understories include Hazel, Field Maple, Hawthorn, Guelder Rose and Holly. This type of woodland is rich in its ground flora and supports species such as Bluebell, Dog's Mercury, Ramsons, Yellow Archangel and Woodruff. Angular Solomon's-seal is recorded and other similar rarities such as Herb Paris, Lily-of-the-valley, Wood Vetch, Greater Butterfly Orchid and Meadow Saffron.

The pasture faces south to south-east and species include Upright Brome, Tor-grass, Red Fescue, Meadow Oat-grass and Quaking-grass. It is herb-rich and includes Common Rock-rose, Dwarf Thistle, Thyme, Salad Burnet and several species of orchid (notably Pyramidal Orchid, Bee Orchid and Green-winged Orchid. The nationally scarce Bastard Toadflax is recorded.

== SSSI Source ==
- Natural England SSSI information on the citation
- Natural England SSSI information on the Puckham Woods units
