= Evan Evans (academic) =

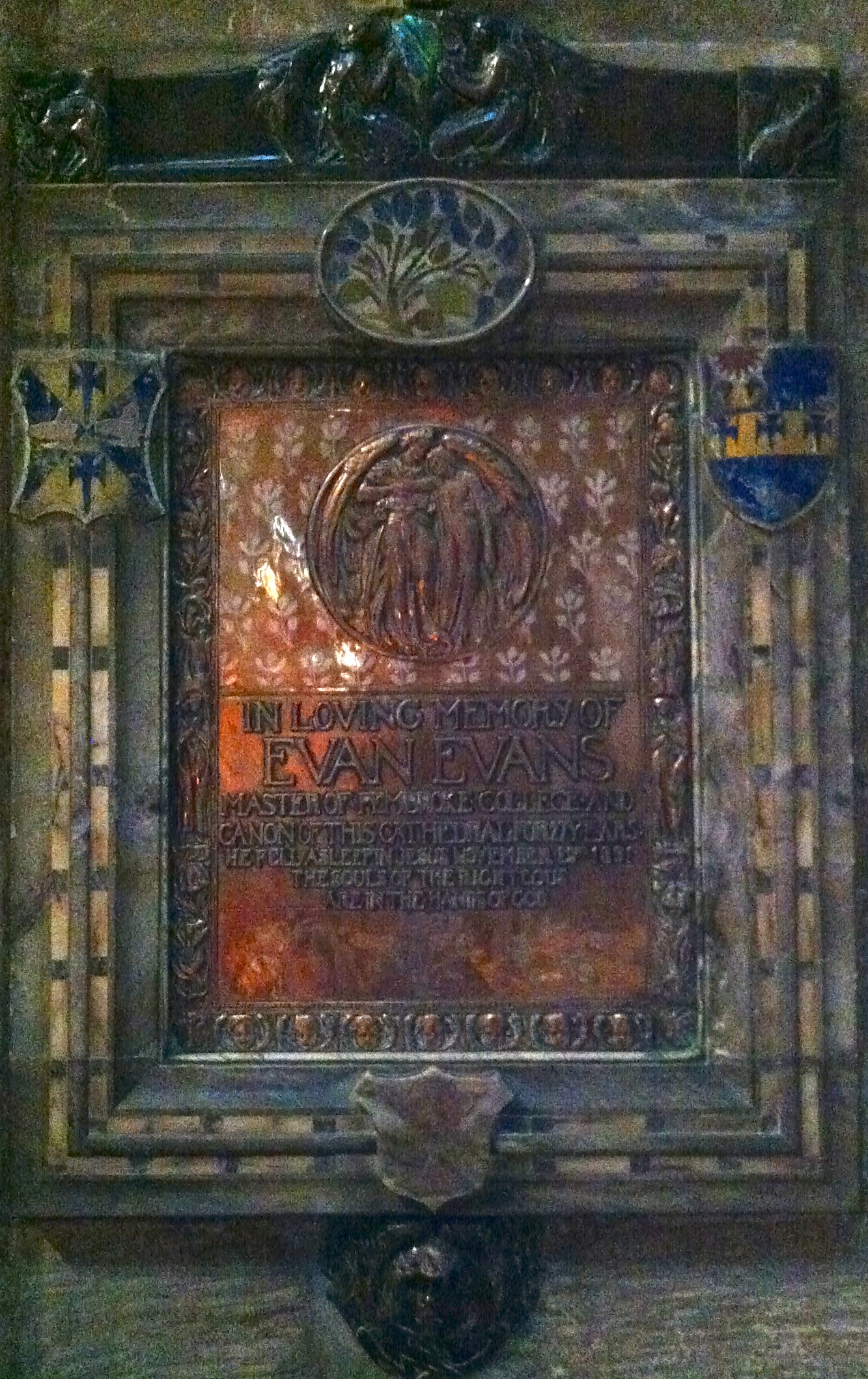
Memorial to Evan Evans in Gloucester Cathedral

Evan Evans (1813 – 23 November 1891) was Master of Pembroke College, Oxford from 1864 to 1891, and Vice-Chancellor of the University of Oxford from 1878 to 1882.

== Early years ==
Evans was born in Cardiff in 1813, the second son of David Evans, a gentleman, and attended Cowbridge School. At the age of 18 went up to Jesus College, Oxford and was matriculated on 22 June 1831, but he migrated to Pembroke College after they awarded him a scholarship, obtaining a Second Class in Literae Humaniores in 1835 and collecting his M.A. in 1838.

== Career ==
Evans was Philipps Fellow of Pembroke College, Oxford from 1843 to 1864, serving as Tutor and senior Dean of the college. In 1851, he was appointed Vicegerent, and then on 3 March 1864 he was elected Master of the College and Canon of Gloucester: this was a combined position that he held until his death in 1891, spending time in the vacation at his canonical residence in Gloucester. The choice of Master had hovered between Evans and another tutor called Bartholomew Price, and a wit wrote the following verse:

Remember when you choose a Head
How small the lump that leavens:
We won’t have Evans at any price,
And as for Price, Oh ’eavens!

Price was eventually to succeed Evans as Master 27 years later.

Evans served the City of Oxford as well as the University while head of his college, and on 9 December 1871 it was announced that he had been appointed an Oxfordshire Magistrate.

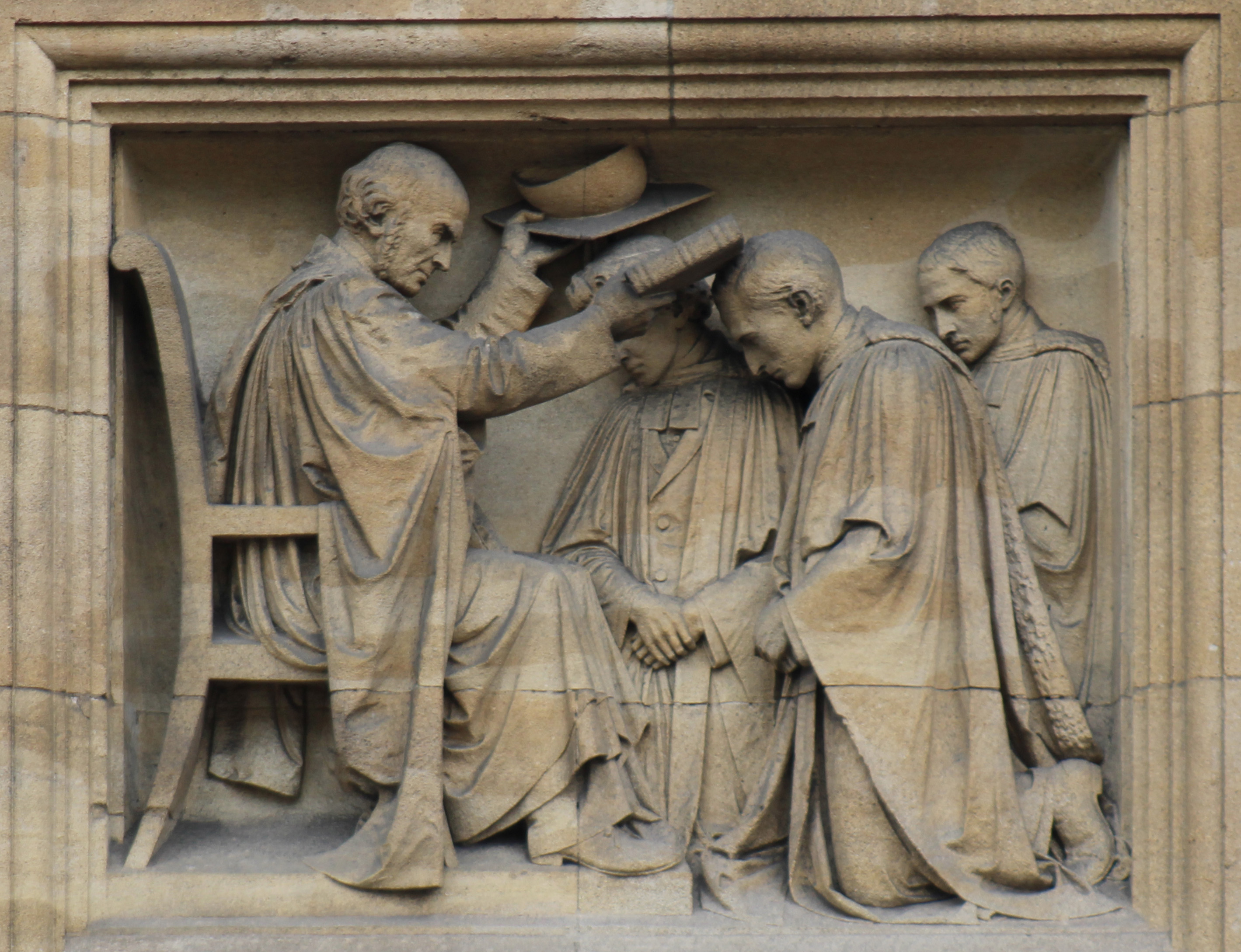
The conferment of degrees

Evans was appointed Pro-Vice-Chancellor of the University of Oxford on 5 November 1874 and was made a Doctor of Divinity by decree on 18 October 1878. He then served a four-year stint as Vice-Chancellor of the University of Oxford from 1878 to 1882. During this period he granted the Randolph Hotel its first licence to serve alcohol, and received the key of the door when the work on the new Examination Schools was completed on 13 May 1882. The sculpture over the High Street door of the Schools that shows the Vice-Chancellor awarding degrees (right) is understood to be modelled on Evans.

In 1878 Evans's name was the first in a memorandum signed by 75 old boys of Cowbridge School urging that the endowment of the Headmaster should be increased in due proportion to the increased value of the lands bequeathed by Sir Leoline Jenkins to Jesus College, Oxford, which owned the school, nearly 200 years before. Hence Evans, after nearly half a century in Oxford, was still taking an interest in his South Wales roots and old school. When he was attending to his prebendal duties at Gloucester during the Long Vacation, he could have kept in touch with both the Cardiff area and with Oxford, as Gloucester is equidistant between the other two cities.

At the time of the 1881 census Evans and his family were at home in the Master's Lodgings at Pembroke, looked after by six live-in servants. His eldest son had already left home: aged only 13, William Noble Evans was a naval cadet on board HMS Dapper at Townstall near Dartmouth, Devon.

The portrait of Evans that hangs in Pembroke College by Walter William Ouless was subscribed for in 1883.

== Marriage and children ==
Heads of Oxford colleges (unlike mere Fellows at this time) were allowed to marry, and on 21 February 1865 (less than one year after his appointment as Master of Pembroke), Evans (aged nearly 52) married Mary Sophia Luxmoore at Everdon Church, Northamptonshire. His bride was 29 years his junior, and her father, who had been Vicar of Barnstaple at the time of her birth, was now Rector of Everdon and conducted the marriage. Their four children were all born in Oxford and baptised as follows at St Aldate's Church near Pembroke College: Gilbert Luxmoore Evans (1866); William Noble Evans (27 July 1867); Mary Beatrice Evans (20 May 1869); and Lewis Herbert Evans (29 October 1870).

== Later years and death ==
The 1891 census shows Evans at the Master's Lodgings in Pembroke College nine months before his death. He was now 77 and ill, with a nurse in residence, and Douglas Macleane wrote that towards the end "his failing powers curtailed his activity as Head of the college". His son Lewis spent census night with him, but his wife and daughter were away in a hotel in Barnstaple. He died at the Master's Lodgings at the age of 77 on 23 November that year. His funeral took place on 28 November 1891, with the first portion of the Burial Service said in the College Chapel on 28 November, followed by interment in a vault at Holywell Cemetery (Plot H.84) on 29 November 1891. As well as by members of his family, the funeral was attended by undergraduates, BAs, MAs, and Fellows of Pembroke College, the Vice-Chancellor and Proctors, heads of other colleges, the Dean of Gloucester, and the Mayor of Oxford.

== Posthumous ==
Two windows in Pembroke College Chapel were added as a memorial to the late Master.

Evans's widow was living in Bushey, Hertfordshire at the time of the 1901 census and his daughter Mary Beatrice Evans, who was an artist, lived with her. His son Lewis Herbert Evans was the Vicar of St John's Church, Eton by 1911.

== See also ==
- Obituary of Evan Evans entitled "The Late Master of Pembroke" in the Oxford Magazine for 1891/2, p. 96
- Obituary of Evan Evans entitled "Death of the Master of Pembroke" in Jackson's Oxford Journal on 28 November 1891, p. 6
- Douglas Macleane, A History of Pembroke College (Oxford Historical Society, 1897)
- Douglas Macleane, Pembroke College (F. E. Robinson & Co., 1900)

Academic offices
Preceded by Francis Jeune	Master of Pembroke College, Oxford; 1864–1891	Succeeded by Bartholomew Price
Preceded by James Edwards Sewell	Vice-Chancellor of Oxford University; 1878–1882	Succeeded by Benjamin Jowett
