= John Hall (bishop) =

English churchman and academic

The Right Reverend John Hall
- Bishop of Bristol
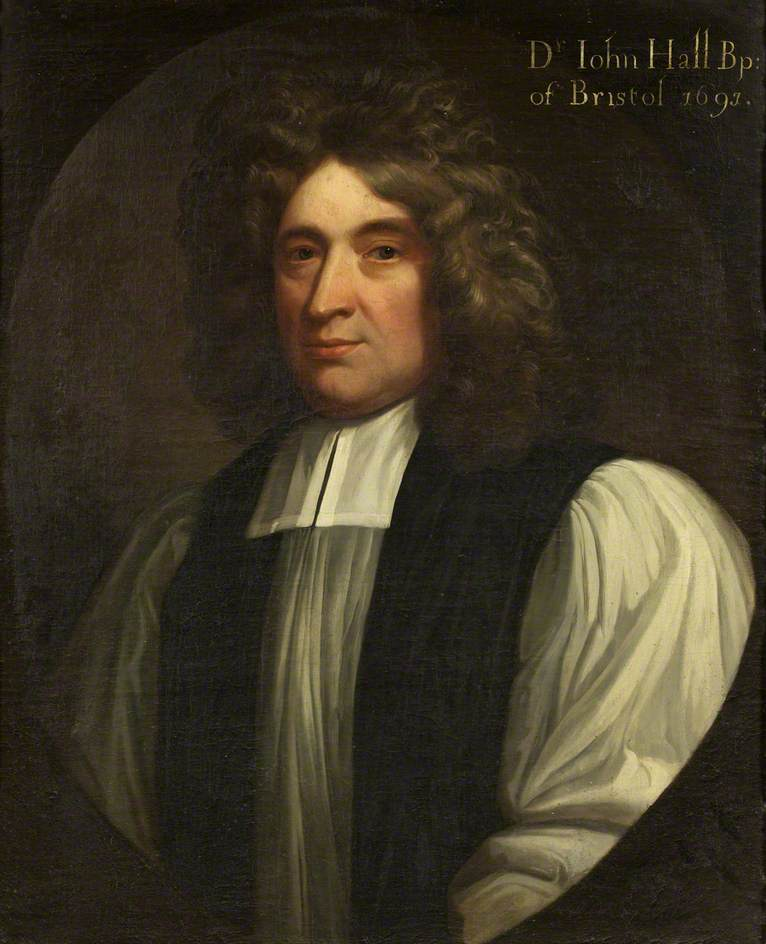
- Diocese: Diocese of Bristol
- In office: 1691–1710
- Predecessor: Gilbert Ironside the Younger
- Successor: John Robinson

Personal details
- Born: 29 January 1633
- Died: February 1710 (aged 76–77)
- Denomination: Anglican
- Education: Merchant Taylors' School; Pembroke College, Oxford

John Hall (1633–1710) was an English churchman and academic, Master of Pembroke College, Oxford, and Bishop of Bristol. He was known as the last of the English bishops to hold to traditional Puritan views.

== Life ==
He was son of John Hall, vicar of Bromsgrove, Worcestershire, and Anne his wife, and was born at his father's vicarage on 29 January 1633. His extended family held presbyterian views; an uncle, Thomas Hall, was an ejected minister in 1662. His brother-in-law, John Spilsbury, held the vicarage of Bromsgrove under the Commonwealth, and also was ejected; his nephew John Spilsbury, a dissenting minister at Kidderminster, became his heir. John Hall was admitted to Merchant Taylors' School in June 1644, and went on to Pembroke College, Oxford, where he was under the tuition of another uncle, Edmund Hall.

Hall became a scholar of Pembroke in 1650, and graduated B. A. in 1651, and M.A. in 1653, when he was also elected fellow. He was chosen Master of Pembroke on 31 December 1664, and appointed to the college living of St Aldate's, Oxford, which he held in commendam till his death. He took his degree of B.D. in 1666, and of D.D. in 1669. He became Lady Margaret Professor of Divinity at Oxford on 24 March 1676. He preached bitterly against Catholic at St. Mary's on 5 November at the time of the Popish Plot allegations in 1678. He was also domestic chaplain to Charles II.

Hall was elected bishop of Bristol, but continued to hold his mastership. He was consecrated in Bow Church on 30 August 1691; the MP Thomas Foley had earlier pressed the new king in July 1689 to have him as the new Bishop of Winchester. He chiefly resided at Oxford, where in 1695 he built a new Master's Lodge. He died there in February 1710, and was buried in the church of at Bromsgrove, where a monument was erected to him on the south wall of the chancel, with an epitaph by William Adams (1673–1714), student of Christ Church and rector of Stanton-on-Wye. He left generous legacies.

== Notes ==
Academic offices
Preceded by Henry Wightwicke	Master of Pembroke College, Oxford; 1664–1709	Succeeded by Colwell Brickenden
Church of England titles
Preceded by Gilbert Ironside	Bishop of Bristol; 1691–1710	Succeeded by John Robinson
