= Winson, Gloucestershire =

English village

Coordinates: 51.777°N 1.870°W

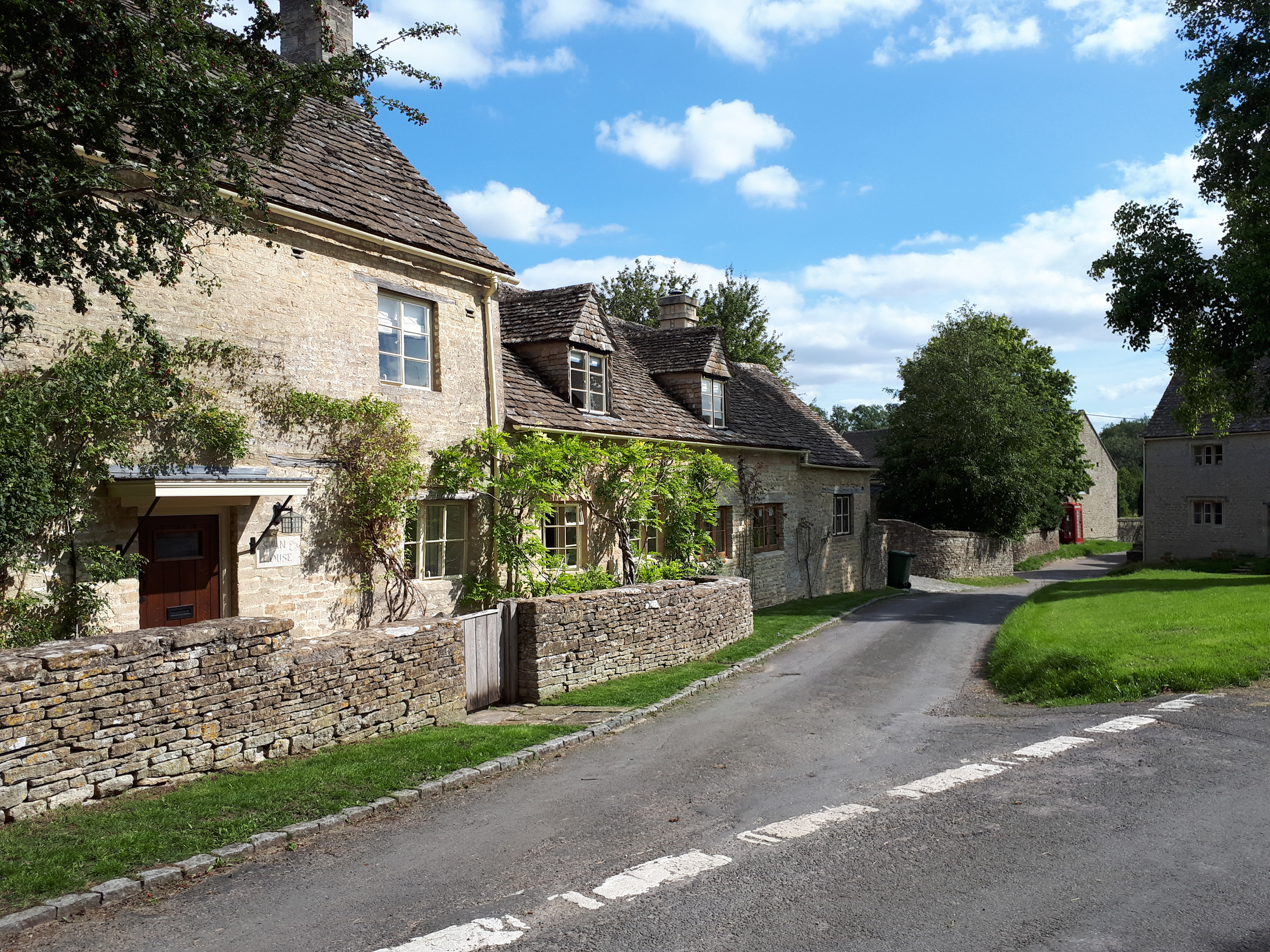
Ditch Lane, Winson

Winson is a village and civil parish in the Cotswold district of the English county of Gloucestershire. The village lies next to the River Coln, 6 miles (9.7 km) north east of Cirencester. Winson has a parish meeting rather than a parish council.

The Church of England parish church of St Michael's dates to before the mid 12th century.

Winson Manor is a grade II* listed country house built in around 1740 for Richard Howse, Surgeon-General to the Army.

The village wheelwright was Walter Field until he retired in around 1960. He displayed his collection of coach and wagon building tools and farming implements in a private museum. When Field retired the business closed and some of his woodworking tools were purchased by the Museum of English Rural Life.
