= William Adams (Master of Pembroke) =

Fellow and Master of Pembroke College, Oxford

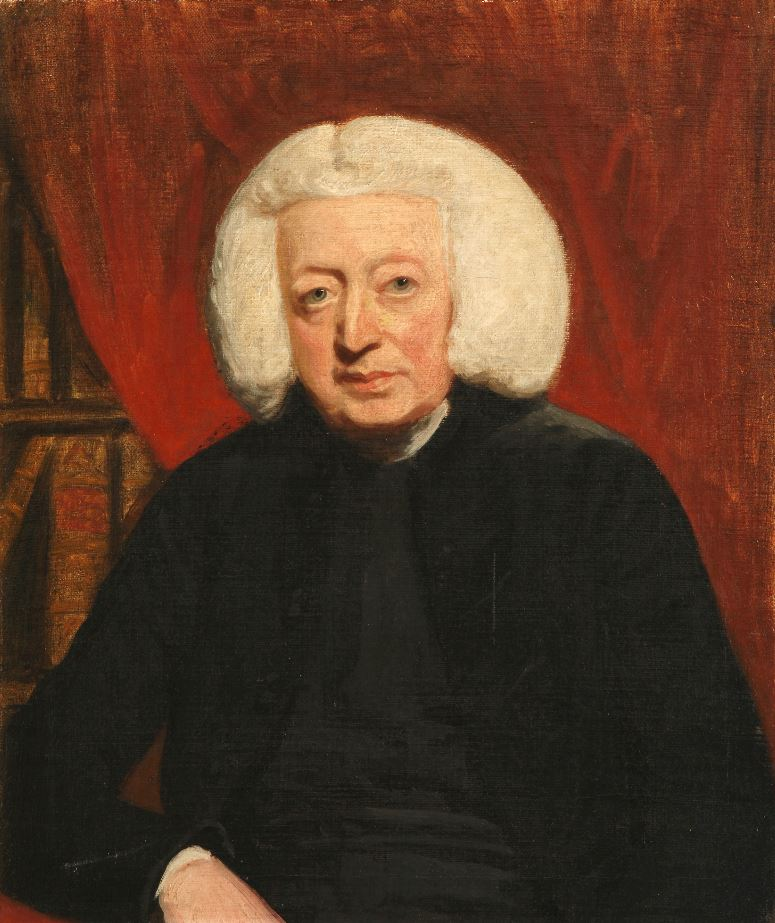
- Photograph of a copy of a portrait of William Adams, held at Abingdon School
- Born: 17 August 1706; Shrewsbury
- Died: 13 February 1789 (aged 82); Gloucester

William Adams (17 August 1706 in Shrewsbury, England – 13 January 1789 in Gloucester, England) was Fellow and Master of Pembroke College, Oxford.

== Early years and education ==
Adams was born at Shrewsbury on 17 August 1706 and baptised at St Chad's Church, Shrewsbury, on 3 September 1706. He was from an old Shropshire and Shrewsbury family, the eldest son of John Adams and Elizabeth Jorden.

He may have attended Shrewsbury School before being educated at John Roysse's Free School in Abingdon (now Abingdon School). He was at Abingdon from c.1716 until 1720 before he was entered into Pembroke College just before his fourteenth birthday, on 6 August 1720. He matriculated at such an early age because he was kin of the co-founder Richard Wightwick. He obtained a B.A., 5 June 1724, master's degree, 18 April 1727 and obtained a fellowship in 1723.

== Tutorship ==
During 1731 (possibly 1730) he succeeded his cousin William Jorden as a tutor at Pembroke College, where he remained until after Easter 1732.

== Curacy ==
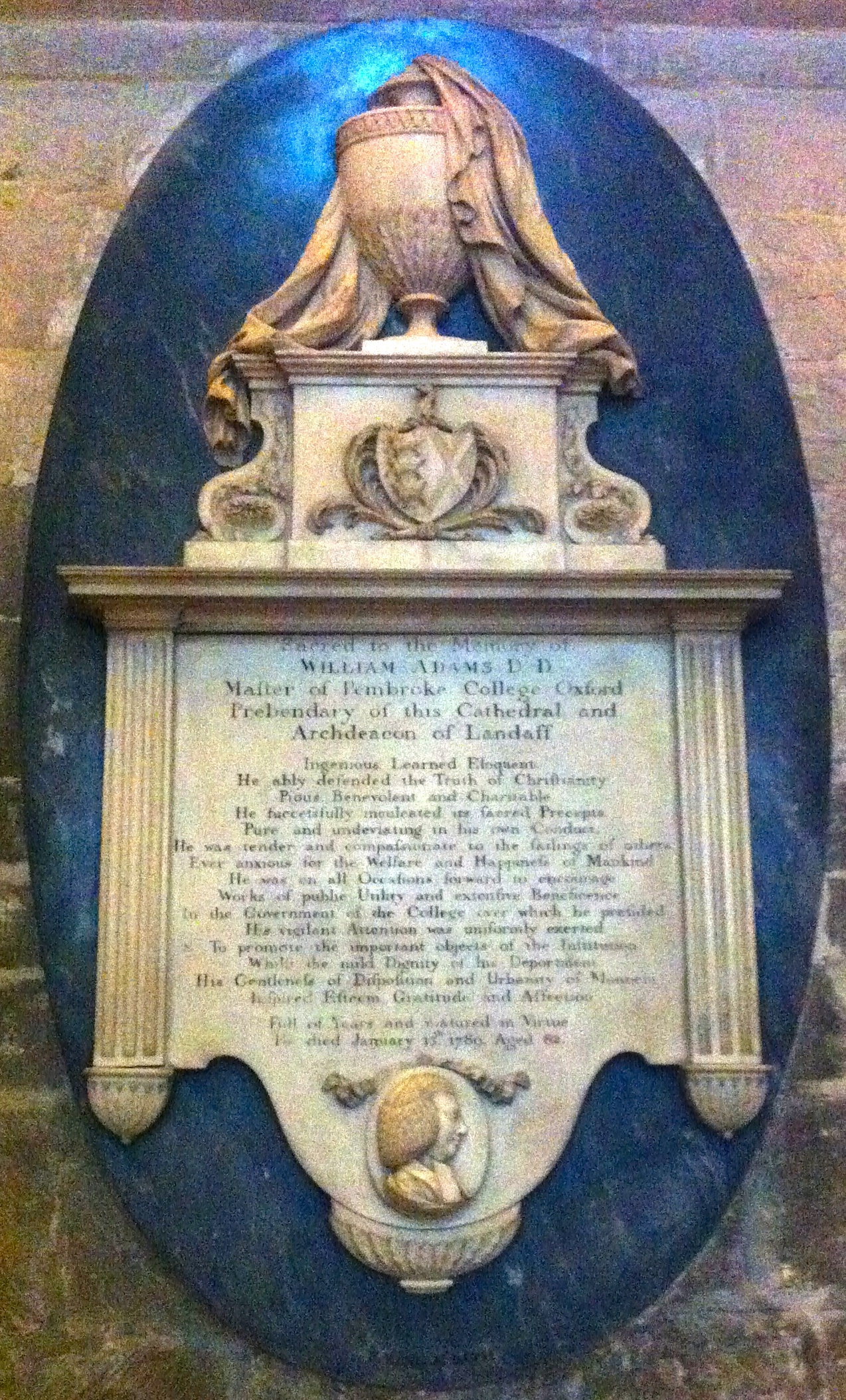
Memorial to William Adams in Gloucester Cathedral

On 26 February 1732, he was presented to the curacy, or, as usually called, the vicarage of St. Chad's in Shrewsbury, which resulted in him leaving the college. He became Prebendary of Lichfield in 1747, Rector of Holgate, Salop in 1748, Canon of Llandaff in 1749 and Precentor in 1750.

In 1756, he visited Oxford, and completed his degrees of BD and D.D. on 12 July, and then went back to Shrewsbury, where he discharged the duties of his ministry with exemplary assiduity, patience, and affection; and contributed a very active part in the foundation of the Salop infirmary, and in promoting its success. The year before he went last to Oxford, he was presented to the rectory of Cound in Shropshire, by Mrs. Elizabeth Cressett of that place, and retained it during his life. In 1774 he was appointed Rector of Bedwas, Co. Monmouth and of Cwm, Flintshire.

== Master ==
In 1775, about 43 years after he left college, John Ratcliffe, Master of Pembroke College, died; and although Adams had out-lived almost all his contemporaries, the gentlemen of the college came to a determination to elect him, a mark of respect due to his public character, and highly creditable to their discernment. He accordingly became Master of Pembroke, 26 July 1775, and in consequence obtained a prebend of Gloucester, which is attached to that office. He now resigned the living of St. Chad, to the lasting regret of his hearers, as well as of the inhabitants at large, to whom he had long been endeared by his amiable character, and pious attention to the spiritual welfare of his flock. He resigned his living of St. Chad's when he was elected Master of Pembroke (succeeded by the Rev. Thomas Humphries on 10 November 1775). During 1777 he was made Archdeacon of Llandaff.

Over the college he presided with universal approbation, and engaged the affections of the students by his courteous demeanour and affability, mixed with the firmness necessary for the preservation of discipline. In his apartments here, he frequently cheered the latter days of his old friend Dr. Samuel Johnson, whom he survived but a few years.

== Personal life ==
Adams married Miss Sarah Hunt (daughter of Thomas Hunt of Boreatton) on 12 July 1742 at St. Chad's, the same church at which he was baptised. They had two children, Thomas baptised and buried during the month of December 1744 and Sarah (born 28 March 1746) who later married, in 1788, to Benjamin Hyatt, Esq. of Painswick, in Gloucestershire. It has generally been reported, that he was afterwards tutor to the celebrated Dr. Samuel Johnson; but Dr. Adams very handsomely contradicted this report, by saying, that had Johnson returned to College after Jordan's (his tutor's) death, he might have been his tutor: "I was his nominal tutor, but he was above my mark." A friendship, however, commenced between them, which lasted during the life of Dr. Johnson, to whose memory Dr. Adams did ample justice. Adams' daughter Sarah was a favourite of Johnson who affectionately called her 'Slim'.

Adams resided at Rowley's Mansions in Hill's Lane, Shrewsbury for many years but died at his prebendal house at Gloucester, 13 January 1789, aged 82. He was interred in Gloucester Cathedral, where a monument was erected, with an inscription, which celebrates his ingenuity, learning, eloquence, piety, and benevolence.

== Publications ==
Adams's first publications were three occasional sermons, printed 1741, 1742, 1749; but his principal work was an Essay on Hume's Essay on Miracles, 8vo, 1752; which was long considered as one of the ablest answers that appeared to David Hume's writings, and was distinguished for acuteness, elegance, and urbanity of style. Hume, whom he once met in London, acknowledged that he had treated him much better than he deserved.

This work was followed by other occasional sermons, which the author collected into a volume, and published in 1777. Only one of these sermons involved him in a controversy. It was entitled "On true and false Doctrine," preached at St. Chad's 4 September 1769, and touched upon some of the principles of the Methodists, in consequence of Adams having lent his pulpit to the Rev. William Romaine, who had there preached a sermon, the tendency of which Adams thought it his duty to counteract. This produced a series of pamphlets between the friends of the respective parties; but it is somewhat singular that neither Adams nor Mr. Romaine took any part in the controversy, nor did Mr. Romaine publish the sermon which had occasioned it. The dispute turned principally on the degree of Calvinism to be found in the Articles, &c. of the Church of England.

== See also ==
- List of Old Abingdonians
- List of people associated with Pembroke College, Oxford

== Sources ==
- Chalmers, Alexander. Appendix to The General Biographical Dictionary. London, [c. 1820]

Academic offices
Preceded by John Ratcliffe	Master of Pembroke College, Oxford; 1775–1789	Succeeded by William Sergrove
Church in Wales titles
Preceded by John Fulham	Archdeacon of Llandaff; 1777–1789	Succeeded by John Porter
