= Matthew Panting =

British clergyman and academic administrator

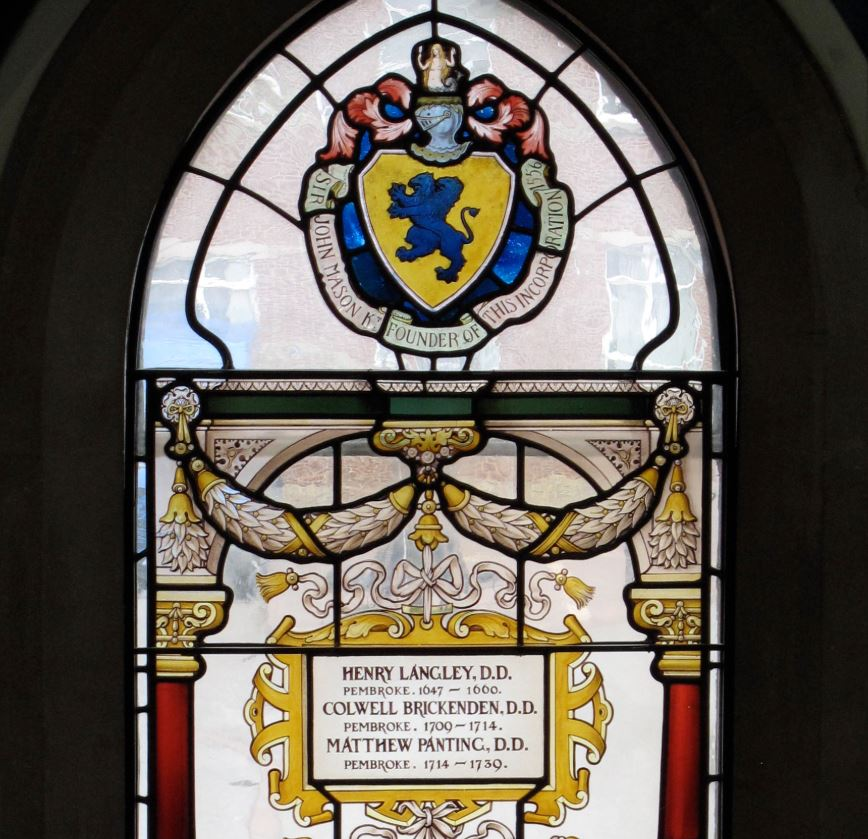
- Stained glass in the Grundy Library, Abingdon School (by Charles Eamer Kempe). The name of Matthew Panting appears as an Old Abingdonian who became a master of an Oxford college.
- Born: 1682
- Died: 12 February 1738 (aged 55–56)

Matthew Panting (1682–1738) was a clergyman and Master of Pembroke College, Oxford.

== Education ==
The son of Matthew Panting of Oxford, the young Matthew entered John Roysse's Free School in Abingdon (now Abingdon School) and was scholar of Pembroke College. BA 1702, MA 1705, BD and Doctor of Divinity 1715.

== Life ==
He was Master of Pembroke from 3 September 1714 until his death in 1738. rector of St Ebbe's church, Oxford (1714–1719), rector of Coln St Rogers and canon of Gloucester Cathedral (1718–1738). He was author of Religious Vows, a Sermon (1732).

Academic offices
Preceded by Colwell Brickenden	Master of Pembroke College, Oxford; 1714–1738	Succeeded by John Ratcliffe

== See also ==
- List of Old Abingdonians
- List of people associated with Pembroke College, Oxford
