= River Coln =

River in Gloucestershire, England

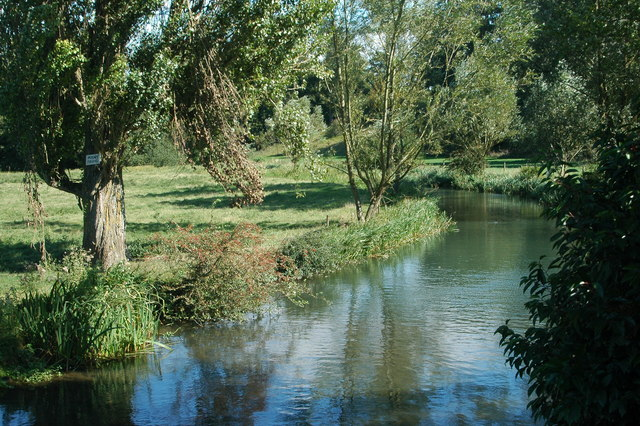
- River Coln south of Coln St Aldwyns, Gloucestershire

Location
- Country: England
- Counties: Gloucestershire
- Towns: Fairford

Physical characteristics
- Source
  - location: Brockhampton, Gloucestershire
  - coordinates: 51°54′36″N 1°57′04″W
- Mouth: River Thames
  - location: Lechlade, Gloucestershire
  - coordinates: 51°41′17″N 1°42′18″W
- Discharge
  - location: Fairford
  - average: 2.06 m^{3}/s (73 cu ft/s)
  - minimum: 0.51 m^{3}/s (18 cu ft/s) 31 October 1990
  - maximum: 6.2 m^{3}/s (220 cu ft/s) 21 February 1995
- Discharge
  - location: Bibury
  - average: 1.33 m^{3}/s (47 cu ft/s)
- Discharge
  - location: Fossebridge
  - average: 0.47 m^{3}/s (17 cu ft/s)

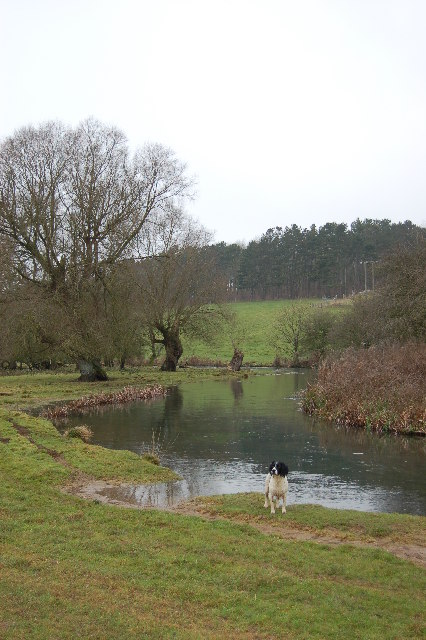
The River Coln between Bibury and Coln St Aldwyn.

The River Coln is a river in Gloucestershire, England. It rises to the north of Brockhampton, a village to the east of Cheltenham, and flows in a south/south-easterly direction through the Cotswold Hills via Andoversford, Withington, Fossebridge, Bibury, Coln St Aldwyns, Quenington and Fairford. It joins the River Thames to the south-west of Lechlade, near to the confluence with the Thames and Severn Canal.

Midway between Withington and Fossbridge the river passes Chedworth Roman Villa.

Extensive gravel pits between Fairford and Lechlade, now redundant, have been flooded to form the eastern component of the Cotswold Water Park. They are fed and drained by the Coln.

The river is host to many species of freshwater fish including brown trout and grayling.

== Water quality ==
The Environment Agency measures the water quality of the river systems in England. Each is given an overall ecological status, which may be one of five levels: high, good, moderate, poor and bad. There are several components that are used to determine this, including biological status, which looks at the quantity and varieties of invertebrates, angiosperms and fish. Chemical status, which compares the concentrations of various chemicals against known safe concentrations, is rated good or fail.

Water quality of the River Coln in 2019:

Section	Ecological Status	Chemical Status	Overall Status	Length	Catchment	Channel
Coln (Source to Coln Rogers)	Moderate	Fail	Moderate	27.138 km (16.863 mi)	89.882 km^{2} (34.704 sq mi)	
Coln (from Coln Rogers) and Thames (Coln to Leach)	Poor	Fail	Poor	28.025 km (17.414 mi)	52.25 km^{2} (20.17 sq mi)	

== See also ==
- Tributaries of the River Thames
- List of rivers in England

Next confluence upstream	River Thames	Next confluence downstream
River Ray (south)	River Coln	River Leach (north)
