= George William Hall =

19th century vice-chancellor of Oxford University

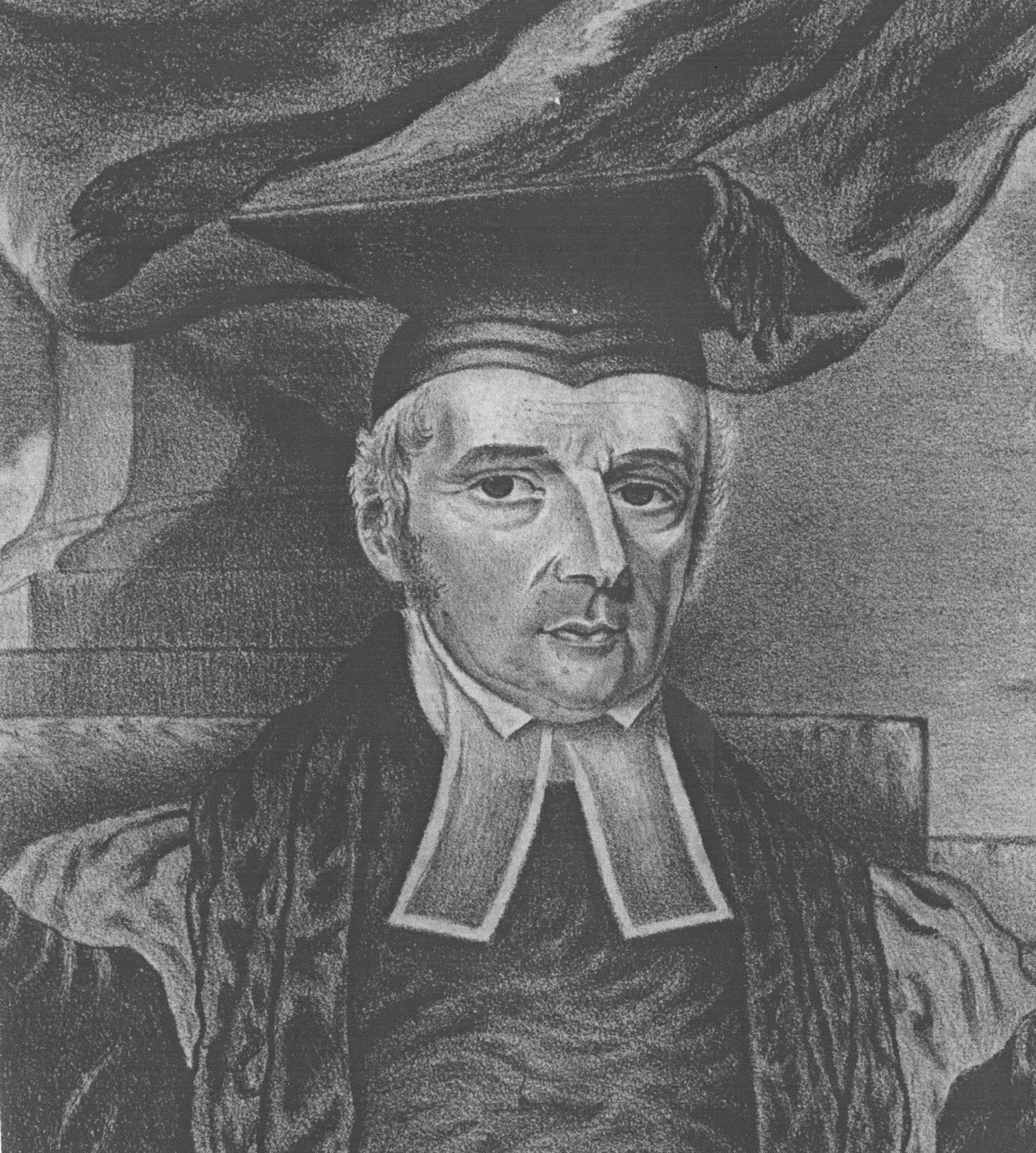
- Portrait held in Abingdon School
- Born: 12 March 1770; London
- Died: December 1843; Oxford

Rev. George William Hall D.D. (1770–1843) was Master of Pembroke College, Oxford (1809–1843) and Vice-Chancellor of Oxford University (1820–1824).

== Education ==
He was born on 12 March 1770 and baptised one month later. George was educated at John Roysse's Free School in Abingdon-on-Thames (now Abingdon School). He was a Fellow at Lincoln College and Pembroke College in Oxford. BA 1792, MA 1795, BD and Doctor of Divinity 1809.

== Career ==
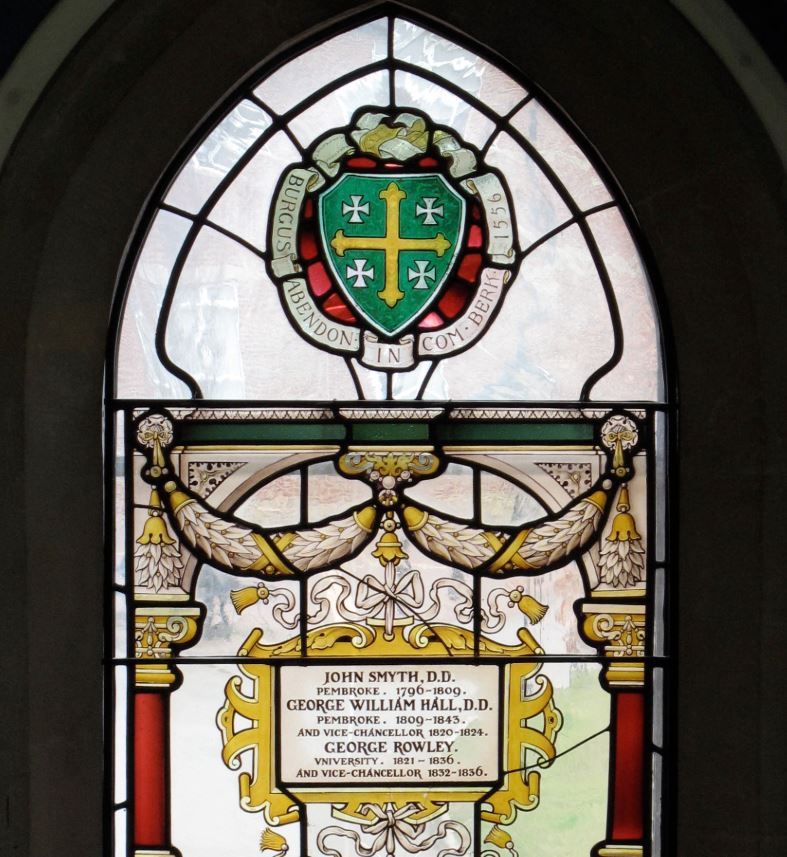
Stained glass by C E Kempe in the Grundy Library at Abingdon School, containing the name of George William Hall

He became Master of Pembroke College, Oxford in 1809 and remained until his death in the third quarter of 1843. He was responsible for overseeing the remodelling of several of the college's features including Broadgates Hall, the Old Quad and the frontage of St. Aldates. He was also Vice Chancellor at Pembroke, from 1820 to 1824.

He was rector of Taynton, Gloucestershire and canon of Gloucester from 1810 until his death in 1843.

== See also ==
- List of Old Abingdonians
- List of people associated with Pembroke College, Oxford

Academic offices
Preceded by John Smyth	Master of Pembroke College, Oxford; 1809–1843	Succeeded by Francis Jeune
Preceded by Frodsham Hodson	Vice-Chancellor of Oxford University; 1820–1824	Succeeded by Richard Jenkyns
