= 2026 deaths in the United States =

- Decades: 2000s; 2010s; 2020s; 2030s
- See also: History of the United States (2016–present); Timeline of United States history (2010–present); List of years in the United States

The following notable deaths in the United States occurred in 2026. Names are reported under the date of death, in alphabetical order. A typical entry reports information in the following sequence: Name, age, country of citizenship at birth and subsequent nationality (if applicable), what subject was noted for, and reference.

== January ==
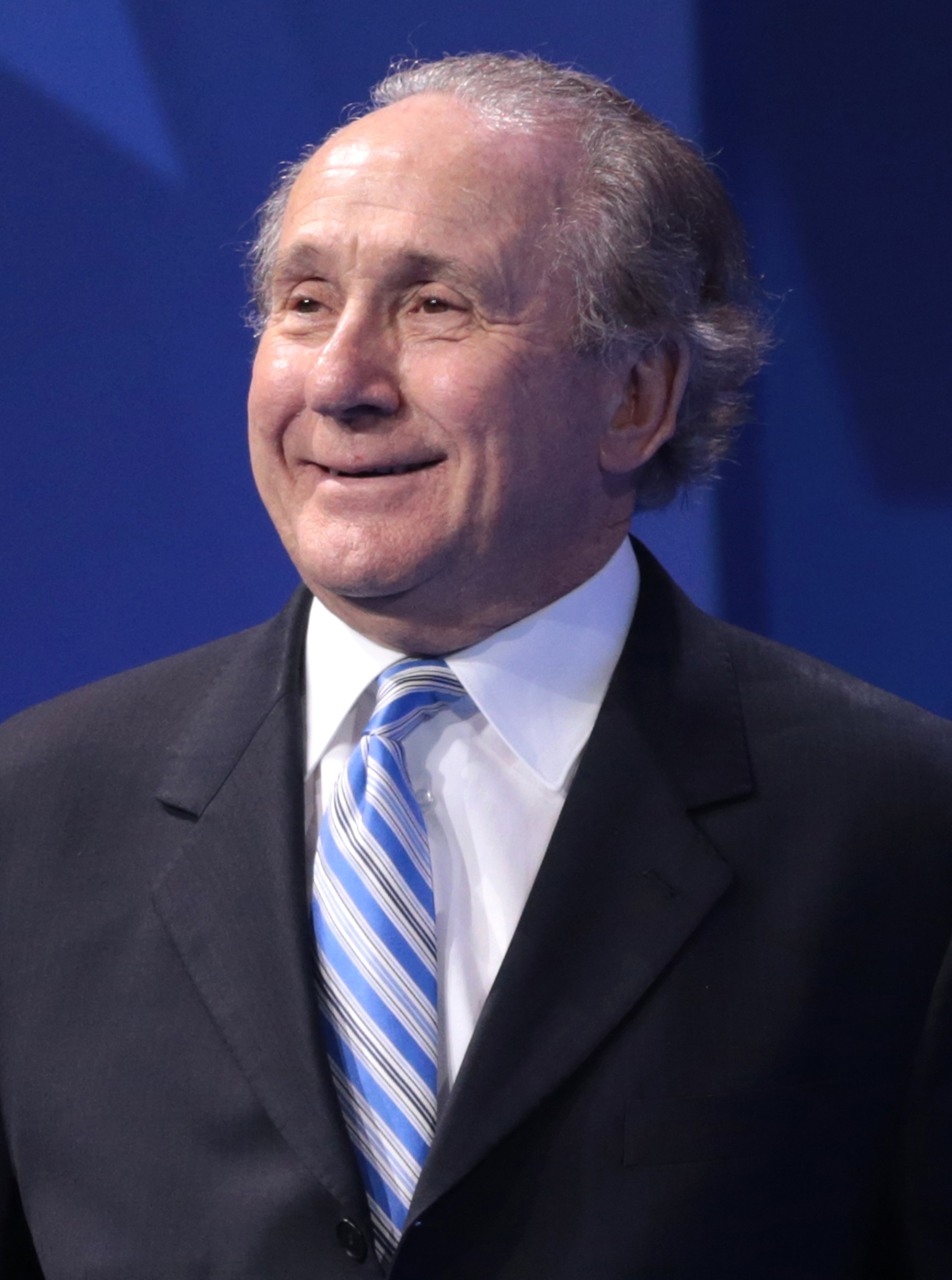
Michael Reagan

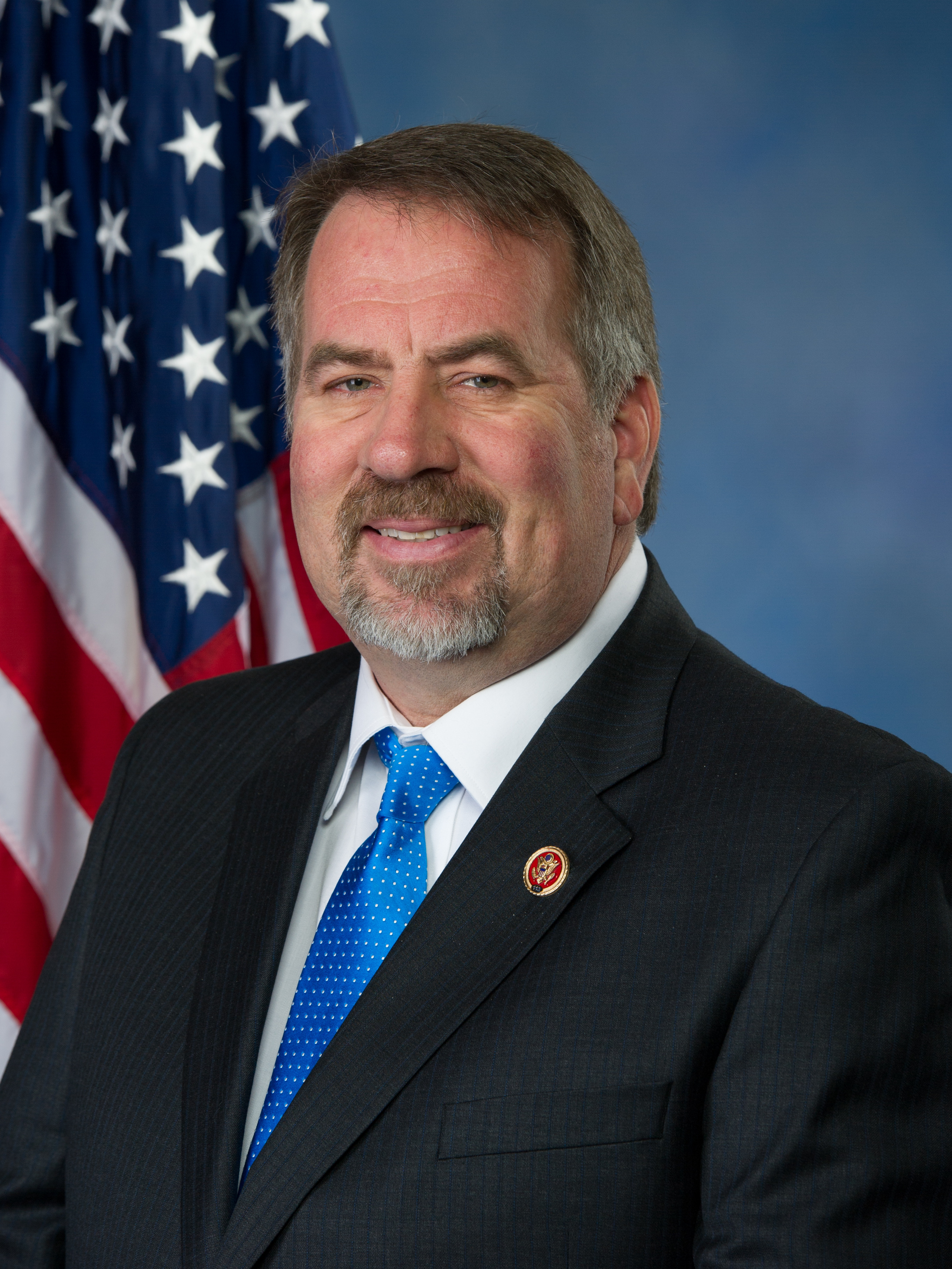
Doug LaMalfa

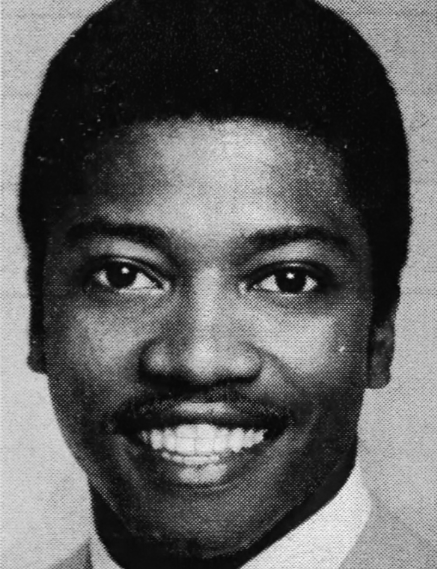
T. K. Carter

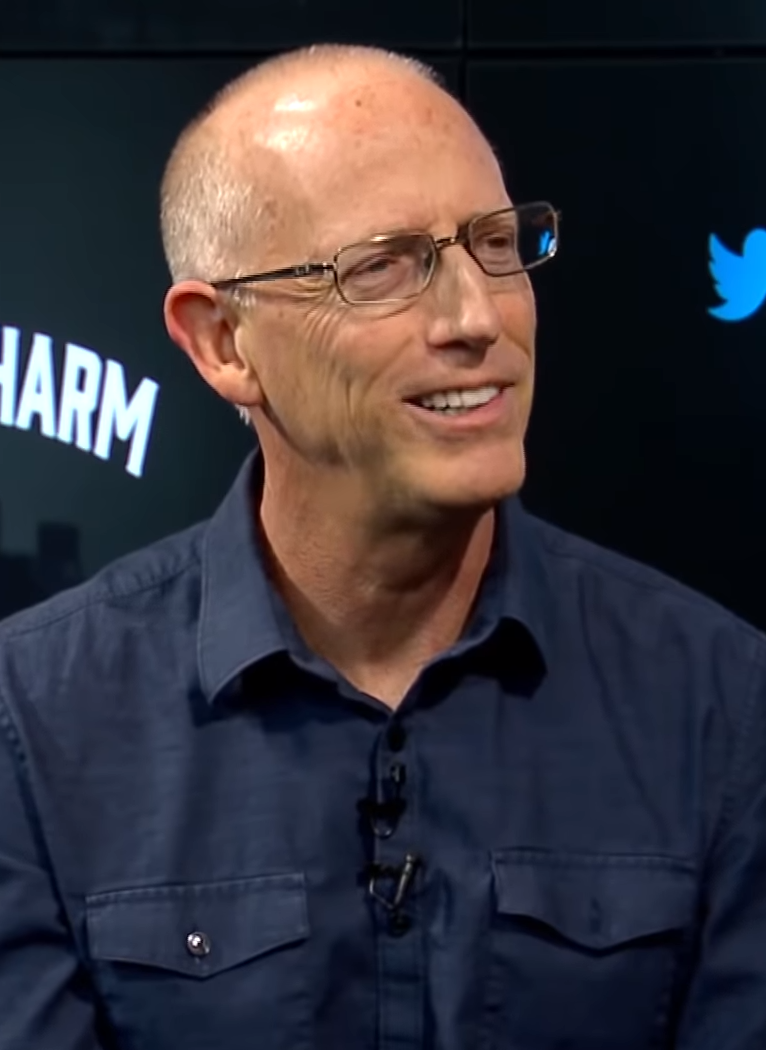
Scott Adams

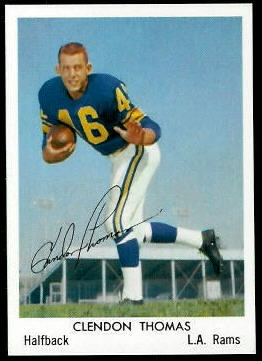
Clendon Thomas

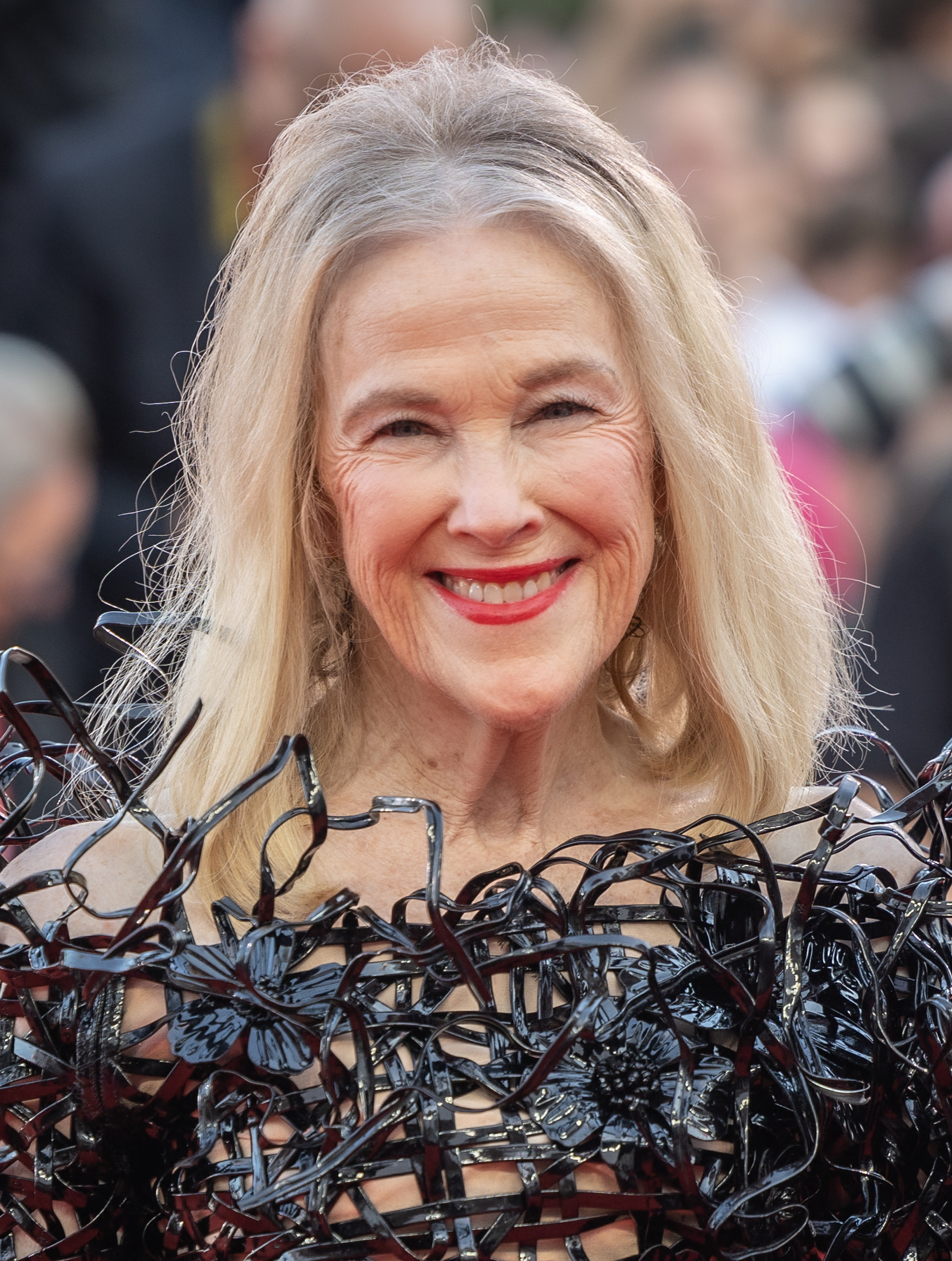
Catherine O'Hara

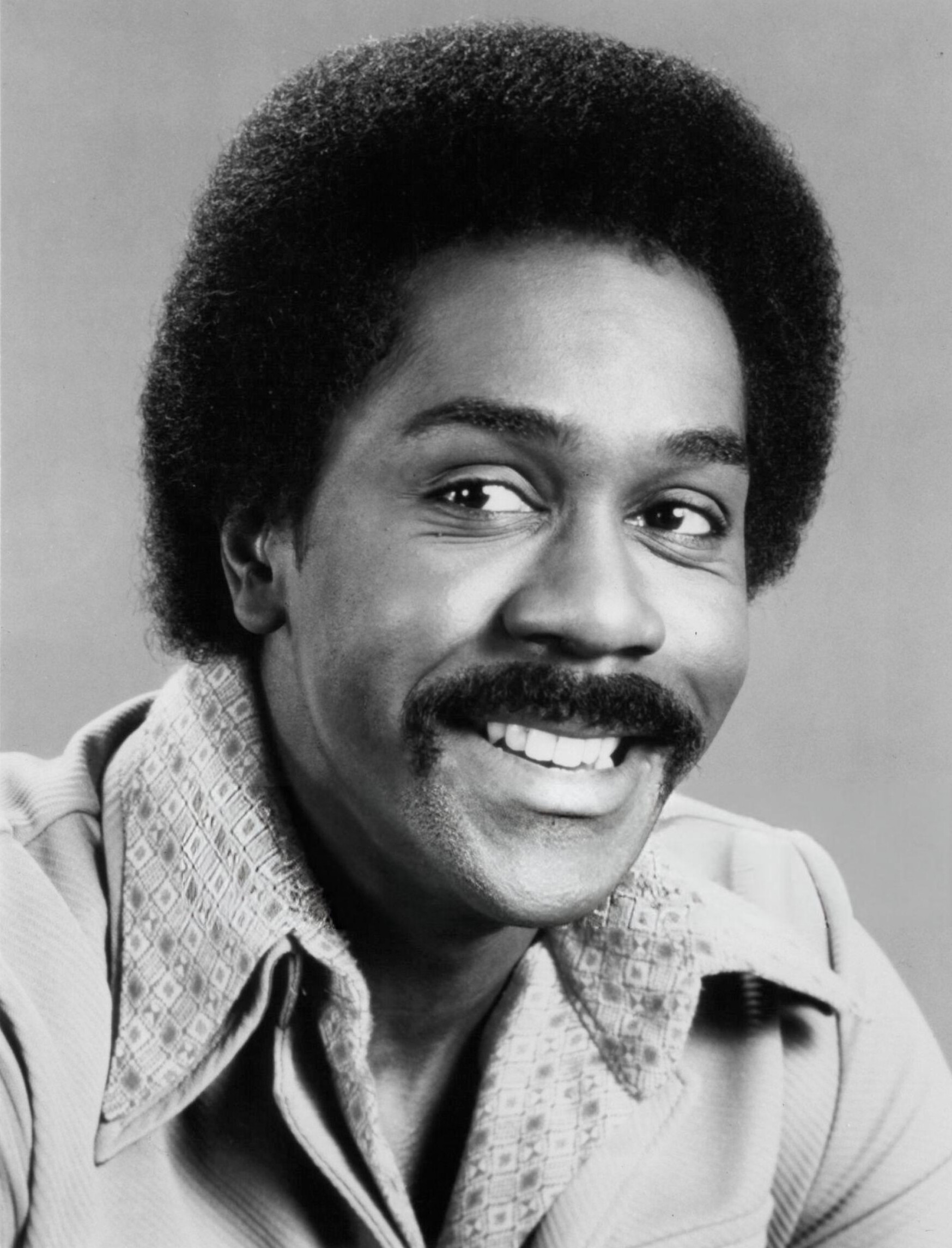
Demond Wilson

- January 1
  - Stuart Altman, 88, economist
  - Allyn Bromley, 97, visual artist and art educator
  - Diane Crump, 77, jockey and horse trainer
  - James Grauerholz, 72, writer
  - Harvey C. Krautschun, 76, politician, member of the South Dakota House of Representatives (1985-1996)
  - John Langdon, 79, typographer and graphic designer
  - Margaret Anne Staggers, 79, politician, member of the West Virginia House of Delegates (2007-2014)
  - Linda S. Wilson, 89, academic administrator, president of Radcliffe College (1989-1999)
- January 2
  - Stephen E. Haggerty, 87, geophysicist
  - Sidney Kibrick, 97, actor (Our Gang)
  - Kristi Kiick, 58, academic
  - Elbert Kimbrough, 87, football player (San Francisco 49ers, Los Angeles Rams, New Orleans Saints)
  - Paul C. Lambert, 97, diplomat, ambassador to Ecuador (1990-1992)
  - Barbara Lawrence, 82, talent manager
  - Johnny Legend, 77, rockabilly musician, film producer and wrestling manager
  - David E. Mitchell, 75, medical activist, founder of Patients for Affordable Drugs Now
  - Con Pederson, 91, visual effects artist (2001: A Space Odyssey, Jay and Silent Bob Strike Back, Garfield: The Movie)
  - Edith Renfrow Smith, 111, supercentenarian
  - Jim Willis, 98, baseball player (Chicago Cubs)
  - Nellie Wong, 91, poet
- January 3
  - Hushang Ansary, 98, Iranian-born diplomat and politician, minister of finance (1974-1977) and information (1971-1974), ambassador to the United States (1967-1969), cardiac arrest
  - Stephen E. Braude, 80, philosopher
  - Marvalene Hughes, 88, educator and academic administrator, president of California State University, Stanislaus (1994-2005) and Dillard University (2005-2011)
  - Nālani Kanakaʻole, 79, kumu hula
  - David M. Maddox, 87, army general
  - Randy Riley, 63, librarian
  - Robert K. Tanenbaum, 83, trial attorney and novelist, mayor of Beverly Hills, California (1988-1989, 1992-1993)
  - Samuel O. Thier, 88, doctor and academic, president of Brandeis University (1991-1994)
  - William H. Yohn Jr., 90, jurist and politician, judge of the U.S. District Court for the Eastern District of Pennsylvania (since 1991), member of the Pennsylvania House of Representatives (1968-1980)
- January 4
  - Forest Able, 93, basketball player (Syracuse Nationals)
  - Tom Britt, 89, interior designer
  - Larry M. Cherry, 69, hairstylist (Ma Rainey's Black Bottom, Malcolm X, Do the Right Thing)
  - Jim Dennison, 87, football coach (Akron Zips, Walsh Cavaliers)
  - Andy Friendly, 74, television producer (Entertainment Tonight)
  - Vicki L. Gregory, 75, academic and librarian
  - Denise Harlow, 55, politician, member of the Maine House of Representatives (2010-2018)
  - George C. Lodge, 98, politician
  - Oscar Lofton, 87, football player (Boston Patriots) and coach (Southeastern Louisiana Lions)
  - Michael Reagan, 80, political commentator
  - Donald C. Rogers, 94, sound engineer (Rocky, The Shawshank Redemption, Star Trek: The Motion Picture)
  - Steve Sheetz, 77, convenience store operator, CEO and president of Sheetz, Inc. (1984-1995)
- January 5
  - Aldrich Ames, 84, counterintelligence officer (CIA) and convicted Soviet-era spy
  - Tom Cherones, 86, television director (Seinfeld, NewsRadio, Ellen)
  - Bruce Hammock, 78, entomologist
  - James E. O'Grady, 96, law enforcement officer, Cook County sheriff (1986-1990)
  - Jawann Oldham, 68, basketball player (Chicago Bulls, Houston Rockets, New York Knicks)
  - Elle Simone, 49, chef (America's Test Kitchen) and food stylist
- January 6
  - John Cunningham, 93, actor (Titanic, Company, Mystic Pizza)
  - Dick Dull, 80, athletic director (Maryland Terrapins)
  - Angella D. Ferguson, 100, pediatrician
  - Edith M. Flanigen, 96, chemist
  - Doug LaMalfa, 65, politician, member of the U.S. House of Representatives (since 2013)
  - Rhoda Levine, 93, opera director and choreographer
  - Jim McBride, 78, country music songwriter ("Chasing That Neon Rainbow", "(Who Says) You Can't Have It All", "Chattahoochee")
  - Jack McGregor, 91, politician and sports team owner, member of the Pennsylvania State Senate (1963-1970) and founder of the Pittsburgh Penguins
  - John F. O'Donohue, 79, actor (NYPD Blue, As Good as It Gets, The Family Man)
  - Stuart Tave, 102, literary scholar
  - Jerry Thomas, 90, baseball player (Minnesota Golden Gophers)
- January 7
  - Frank S. Cerveny, 92, Episcopalian clergyman, bishop of Florida (1974-1992)
  - John W. Derr, 84, politician, member of the Maryland Senate (1983-1999)
  - Renée Good, 37, poet and writer, shot
  - Rebecca Kilgore, 76, jazz vocalist
  - John Levra, 88, college football player (Pittsburg State Gorillas) and coach (New Mexico Highlands Cowboys, Stephen F. Austin Lumberjacks)
  - Jon Lindsay, 90, politician, member of the Texas Senate (1997-2007)
  - Randy McMillan, 67, football player (Baltimore/Indianapolis Colts)
  - Roberto Mondragón, 85, politician, lieutenant governor of New Mexico (1971-1975, 1979-1983)
  - Nancy Skinner Nordhoff, 93, philanthropist and environmentalist
  - Raj Kumar Pathria, 92, Indian-born physicist
  - Howard Sanderford, 90, politician, member of the Alabama House of Representatives (1989-2022)
  - Billy Truax, 82, football player (Los Angeles Rams, Dallas Cowboys)
- January 8
  - Michael McElroy, 86, scientist
  - Guy Moon, 63, composer (The Fairly OddParents, Big Time Rush, Danny Phantom)
  - Matthew Taylor, 57-58, musician (Bellini) and artist
  - Paul Calvin Visser, 89, politician, mayor of Flint, Michigan (1973-1975)
- January 9
  - T. K. Carter, 69, actor (The Thing, Punky Brewster, Runaway Train)
  - Robert Croft, 91, freediver
  - Frank J. Frost, 96, scholar and politician
  - Sandra Hester, 68, socio-political activist
  - Nessa Hyams, 84, casting director (The Exorcist, Blazing Saddles) and television director (Mary Hartman, Mary Hartman)
  - Philip Long, 77, Olympic swimmer (1968)
  - Daniel Moerman, 84, medical anthropologist and ethnobotanist
  - Ted Nichols, 97, composer, conductor and arranger (The Flintstones, Jonny Quest)
  - Larry Snook, 84, politician
  - Jaro Zawislan, 55, college soccer coach (Cornell Big Red)
- January 10
  - Fredrick Brennan, 31, software developer, founder of 8chan
  - Dan Coleman, 63, football player (Minnesota Vikings)
  - Distorted Humor, 32, Thoroughbred racehorse and sire
  - Jim Hartung, 65, gymnast, Olympic champion (1984), and coach
  - Kathy Javner, 52, politician, member of the Maine House of Representatives (since 2018)
  - Robert W. Kostelka, 92, judge and politician, member of the Louisiana State Senate (2003-2016)
  - Manolo Villaverde, 91, Cuban-born actor (¿Qué Pasa, USA?, Taina, Wiseguy)
  - Bob Weir, 78, Hall of Fame musician (Grateful Dead) and songwriter ("Sugar Magnolia", "One More Saturday Night")
  - Robert Wolgemuth, 77, author, chairman of the Evangelical Christian Publishers Association
- January 11
  - Louis E. Brus, 82, chemist, Nobel Prize laureate (2023)
  - Thomas Causey, 76, sound engineer (Dick Tracy, Star Trek Generations, Escape from New York)
  - Richard Codey, 79, politician, governor of New Jersey (2004-2006), member of the New Jersey Senate (1982-2024)
  - Patrick Corrigan, 69, psychologist and writer
  - René V. Dawis, 97, psychologist
  - William Gazecki, 69, film director (Waco: The Rules of Engagement)
  - Dave Giusti, 86, baseball player (Houston Astros, Pittsburgh Pirates), World Series champion (1971)
  - Bennie Carlton Keel, 91, archaeologist
  - Takashi Ono, 97, Japanese-born mathematician
  - William E. Peterson, 89, politician, member of the Illinois House of Representatives (1983-1993) and Senate (1993-2009)
  - Clarence Pierce, 97, politician, member of the Mississippi House of Representatives (1952-1984)
  - Robert G. Shulman, 101, biophysicist
- January 12
  - Mark Brnovich, 59, politician and attorney, Arizona attorney general (2015-2023)
  - Bill Courtney, 55, college basketball coach (Cornell Big Red, Miami Hurricanes, Temple Owls)
  - John Forté, 50, rapper (Refugee Camp All-Stars) and producer (The Score)
  - Rick Garcia, 69, LGBTQ activist
  - Robert V. Kohn, 72, mathematician
  - Robert H. Liebeck, 87, aerodynamicist, academic and aerospace engineer
  - Pedro A. Sanchez, 85, soil scientist
  - Karen Vold, 86, Hall of Fame trick rider
- January 13
  - Scott Adams, 68, cartoonist (Dilbert)
  - Alfred Blumstein, 95, scientist
  - Claudette Colvin, 86, civil rights activist (Browder v. Gayle)
  - Peter Duesberg, 89, German-born molecular biologist and academic
  - Brandon Holiday, 53, canoeist
  - Doug McConnell, 80, television journalist
  - Stu Tate, 63, baseball player (San Francisco Giants)
  - Jerry Wilburn, 85, politician, member of the Mississippi House of Representatives (1964-1980)
- January 14
  - Rick Link, 66, professional wrestler, trainer and promoter
- January 15
  - J. Lawrence Cogan, 81, medical examiner, Los Angeles County chief medical examiner-coroner (1990-1992)
  - Ray Crone, 94, baseball player (Milwaukee Braves, New York/San Francisco Giants), and scout (Montreal Expos)
  - Bill Hembree, 59, politician, member of the Georgia House of Representatives (1993-1997, 1999-2013)
  - Jim Wearne, 75, musician
  - James F. White, 90, politician
- January 16
  - Bruce Bilson, 97, television director (Get Smart, Hogan's Heroes, Dinosaurs), Emmy winner (1968)
  - Chet Brooks, 60, football player (San Francisco 49ers), Super Bowl champion (1989, 1990)
  - Rocco B. Commisso, 76, Italian-born businessman and football team owner (Fiorentina)
  - Bob Duffy, 85, basketball player (St. Louis Hawks, Detroit Pistons, New York Knicks)
  - Joel T. Johnson, 89, politician, member of the Nebraska Legislature (2002-2009)
  - Mark Jones, 72, screenwriter and film director (Leprechaun, Rumpelstiltskin, Triloquist)
  - Tom Kim, 81, North Korean-born physician
  - Chris Krug, 86, baseball player (Chicago Cubs, San Diego Padres)
  - Jefery Levy, 67, filmmaker (S.F.W., The Key) (death announced on this date)
  - Frank Pitts, 82, football player (Kansas City Chiefs, Cleveland Browns, Oakland Raiders)
  - Carl Sommer, 95, author, educator and businessman
  - Arthur Tobin, 95, politician
- January 17
  - Roger Allers, 76, film director (The Lion King, Open Season), animator and story artist (Aladdin)
  - Craig Anderson, 83, Episcopalian clergyman and theologian, bishop of South Dakota (1984-1992)
  - Ann Ashmead, 96, archaeologist
  - Travis Curtis, 60, football player (Washington Redskins, New York Jets, Phoenix Cardinals), Super Bowl champion (XXVI)
  - Hoot Gibson, 86, football player (San Diego Chargers, Oakland Raiders) and coach
  - Nicholas Krall, 93, physicist
  - Barbara McNamara, 83, linguist
  - James Petras, 89, sociologist and academic
  - Gladys West, 95, mathematician
  - Wilbur Wood, 84, baseball player (Boston Red Sox, Pittsburgh Pirates, Chicago White Sox)
  - Tucker Zimmerman, 84, singer-songwriter
- January 18
  - Arthur Bankhurst, 88, rheumatologist
  - Georges Borchardt, 97, literary agent
  - H. K. Edgerton, 77, neo-Confederate activist
  - Diana Green, 71, cartoonist
  - Stephen H. Hess, 92, political scientist
  - Clare Cooper Marcus, 91, educator
  - Zach Monroe, 94, baseball player (New York Yankees), World Series champion (1958)
  - Ford C. Quillen, 87, politician, member of the Virginia House of Delegates (1970-1994)
  - Ralph Towner, 85, jazz multi-instrumentalist
- January 19
  - John Cenci, 92, football player (Pittsburgh Steelers)
  - Paul F. Gorman, 98, Army general
  - Billy Parker, 88, country music singer and DJ
  - Dave Schmidt, 69, baseball player (Boston Red Sox)
  - Kim Vo, 55, hairstylist
- January 20
  - John H. Beyer, 92, architect
  - Barbara Aronstein Black, 92, legal scholar
  - Tommie Brown, 91, politician, member of the Tennessee House of Representatives (1992-2012), plaintiff in Brown v. Board of Commissioners of the City of Chattanooga
  - Louva Dahozy, 99, Navajo rights activist
  - Vicki L. Hanson, computer scientist
  - Robert E. Hunter, 85, foreign policy advisor, ambassador to NATO (1993-1998)
  - Ronald Joseph, 81, figure skater, Olympic bronze medallist (1964)
  - Susan Leeman, 95, endocrinologist
  - Gordon L. Rottman, 78, author and military historian
  - Bernice Shedrick, 85, politician, member of the Oklahoma Senate (1980-1996)
- January 21
  - Mark Batzer, 64, geneticist and academic
  - José Cuéllar, 85, anthropologist and musician
  - Richard Dugdale, 97, oceanographer
  - Bobby Duncum, 81, professional wrestler (WWWF, NWA, AWA) and football player
  - Stanley Gerzofsky, 81, politician, member of the Maine Senate (2009-2017)
  - Kevin Johnson, 55, football player (Philadelphia Eagles, Oakland Raiders)
  - Rob Maurer, 59, baseball player (Texas Rangers)
  - Virginia Oliver, 105, lobster fisher
  - Anthony P. Vainieri, 97, politician, member of the New Jersey General Assembly (1984-1986)
- January 22
  - Laura Adler, 65, casting director (American Dreams, Dream On, My Boys)
  - John L. Allen Jr., 61, journalist (Crux)
  - Linden Bateman, 85, politician, member of the Idaho House of Representatives (1976-1986, 2010-2016)
  - Eldaafer, 20, Thoroughbred racehorse
  - Marian Goodman, 97, art dealer
  - Guy Hovis, 84, singer (The Lawrence Welk Show)
  - William Safran, 95, academic and Holocaust survivor
  - Hudson Talbott, 76, children's author and illustrator (We're Back! A Dinosaur Story)
  - Sammy Turner, 93, singer
  - Floyd Vivino, 74, actor (Good Morning, Vietnam, Crazy People, Mr. Wonderful), comedian, and television host
  - Hilton Woods, 57,-Dutch Olympic swimmer (1984, 1988)
- January 23
  - Robert A. Baines, 79, politician, mayor of Manchester, New Hampshire (2000-2006)
  - Ed Bernard, 86, actor (Police Woman, The White Shadow, Hardcastle and McCormick)
  - John Brodie, 90, football player (San Francisco 49ers)
  - Otto Duecker, 77, painter
  - Phil Griego, 77, politician, member of the New Mexico Senate (1997-2015)
  - Yvonne Lime, 90, actress (I Was a Teenage Werewolf, The Rainmaker, Father Knows Best)
  - Donald John Roberts, 80, Canadian-born economist
- January 24
  - Sal Buscema, 89, comic book artist (Hulk, Spider-Man, Rom the Space Knight)
  - Noel W. Campbell, 84, politician, member of the Arizona House of Representatives (2015-2021)
  - Paul William Coteus, 72, electrical engineer
  - Lee Fobbs, 75, football player (Ottawa Rough Riders) and coach (North Carolina A&T Aggies, Grambling State Tigers)
  - William Foege, 89, physician and epidemiologist, director of the CDC (1977-1983)
  - William M. Keys, 88, Marine general
  - Michael Parenti, 92, political scientist and academic historian
  - Alex Pretti, 37, nurse
- January 25
  - Michael F. Adams, 77, political staffer and educator, president of the University of Georgia (1997-2013)
  - Robert Joseph Banks, 97, Roman Catholic prelate, auxiliary bishop of Boston (1985-1990) and bishop of Green Bay (1990-2003)
  - Philip G. Killey, 84, air force general
  - Gabe Lopez, 31, songwriter and producer
  - Geoffrey Mason, 85, television producer (ABC Sports, ESPN)
  - Rafael Pineda, 88, Cuban-born journalist and television news reporter
  - Chet Raymo, 89, writer
  - Harilyn Rousso, 79, disability rights activist
  - Frederick Vreeland, 98, politician and diplomat, ambassador to Morocco (1992-1993)
- January 26
  - Richie Beirach, 78, jazz pianist and composer
  - Barney Cable, 90, basketball player (Detroit Pistons, Syracuse Nationals, St. Louis Hawks)
  - Frederick King Keller, 75, television director (The Pretender, New York Undercover, Hey Dude)
  - Produce Pete, 80, chef and television personality
  - Clendon Thomas, 90, football player (Los Angeles Rams, Pittsburgh Steelers)
  - Maggie Van Ostrand, 92, writer, humorist and columnist
- January 27
  - Robert G. Bottoms, 81, education executive, president of DePauw University (1986-2008)
  - Brad Branson, 67, basketball player (Cleveland Cavaliers, Indiana Pacers)
  - Louis J. Ceci, 98, judge, justice of the Wisconsin Supreme Court (1982-1993)
  - Wiley Drake, 82, minister and radio host
  - Akira Iriye, 91, Japanese-born historian
  - Mingo Lewis, 72, percussionist and drummer (Santana, Al Di Meola, The Tubes)
  - Gerald M. McCue, 97, architect, dean of the Harvard Graduate School of Design (1980-1992)
  - Dennis Milton, 64, boxer
  - John Overington, 79, politician, member of the West Virginia House of Delegates (2003-2019)
  - Neil Pappalardo, 83, technology businessman, cofounder of Meditech
  - Shirley Raines, 58, non-profit founder
  - James Sallis, 81, writer (Drive, Driven), poet and biographer
  - Gloria Wade-Gayles, 88, educator and author
- January 28
  - Fobazi Ettarh, 36-37, academic and librarian
  - Peter Hargitai, 79, Hungarian-born poet, novelist and translator
  - Bryan Loren, 59, songwriter ("Do the Bartman")
  - Dan McQuade, 43, journalist and writer
  - Robert W. Pratt, 78, jurist, judge (since 1997) and chief judge (2006-2011) of the United States District Court for the Southern District of Iowa
  - Dominick Salvatore, 85, economist
  - Charles Victor Thompson, 55, convicted murderer
- January 29
  - Ted Berger, 85, arts activist
  - Graham E. Fuller, 89, political analyst
  - Kenneth Hyman, 97, film executive (Warner Bros.-Seven Arts) and producer (The Dirty Dozen, The Hill)
  - Woodie King Jr., 88, theatre director, founder of the New Federal Theatre
  - Scott Laidlaw, 72, football player (Dallas Cowboys), Super Bowl champion (XII)
  - Suzannah Lessard, 81, writer
  - Noel Mayo, 88, industrial designer
  - Michael H. Prosser, 89, academic
  - Raimonds Staprans, 99, Latvian-born visual artist and playwright
  - Willie Taylor, 79, basketball player
- January 30
  - Chip Berlet, 76, journalist and author
  - Arthur P. Dempster, 96, mathematician
  - Parthenon Huxley, 70, musician (ELO Part II)
  - X. J. Kennedy, 96, poet
  - Mark Marquess, 78, college baseball coach (Stanford Cardinal)
  - Catherine O'Hara, 71, Canadian-born actress (Schitt's Creek, Beetlejuice, Home Alone), Emmy winner (1982, 2019)
  - Larry Reed, 81, shadow puppeteer
  - H. Robert Reynolds, 91, musician and conductor
  - Demond Wilson, 79, actor (Sanford and Son, The New Odd Couple, Me and the Kid) and author
- January 31
  - Ismael Ahmed, 79, health official, director of the Michigan Department of Health and Human Services (2007-2011)
  - Billy Bass Nelson, 75, Hall of Fame bass guitarist (Parliament-Funkadelic)
  - Rick Renick, 81, baseball player (Minnesota Twins)
  - Burt Wolf, 87, journalist and writer

== February ==
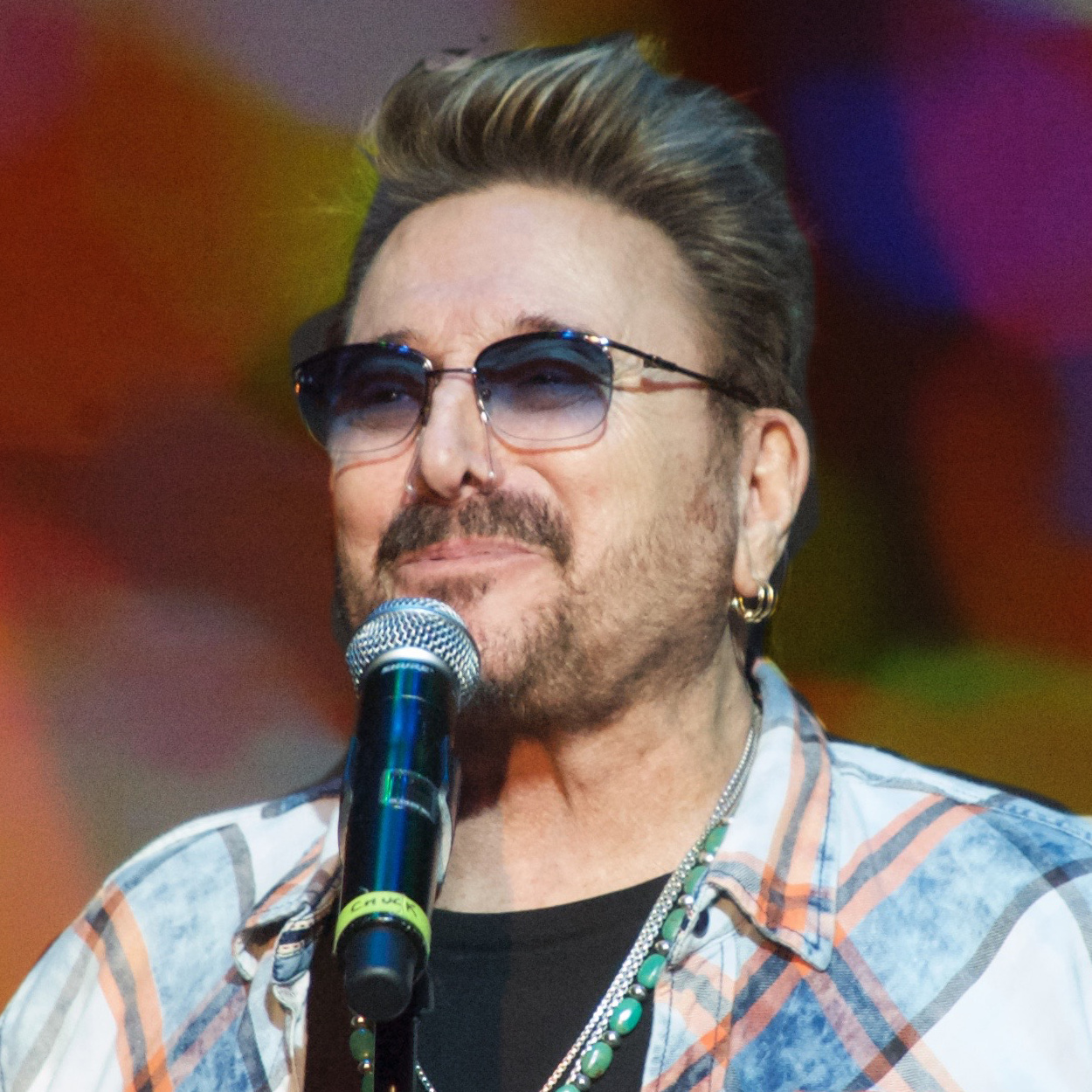
Chuck Negron

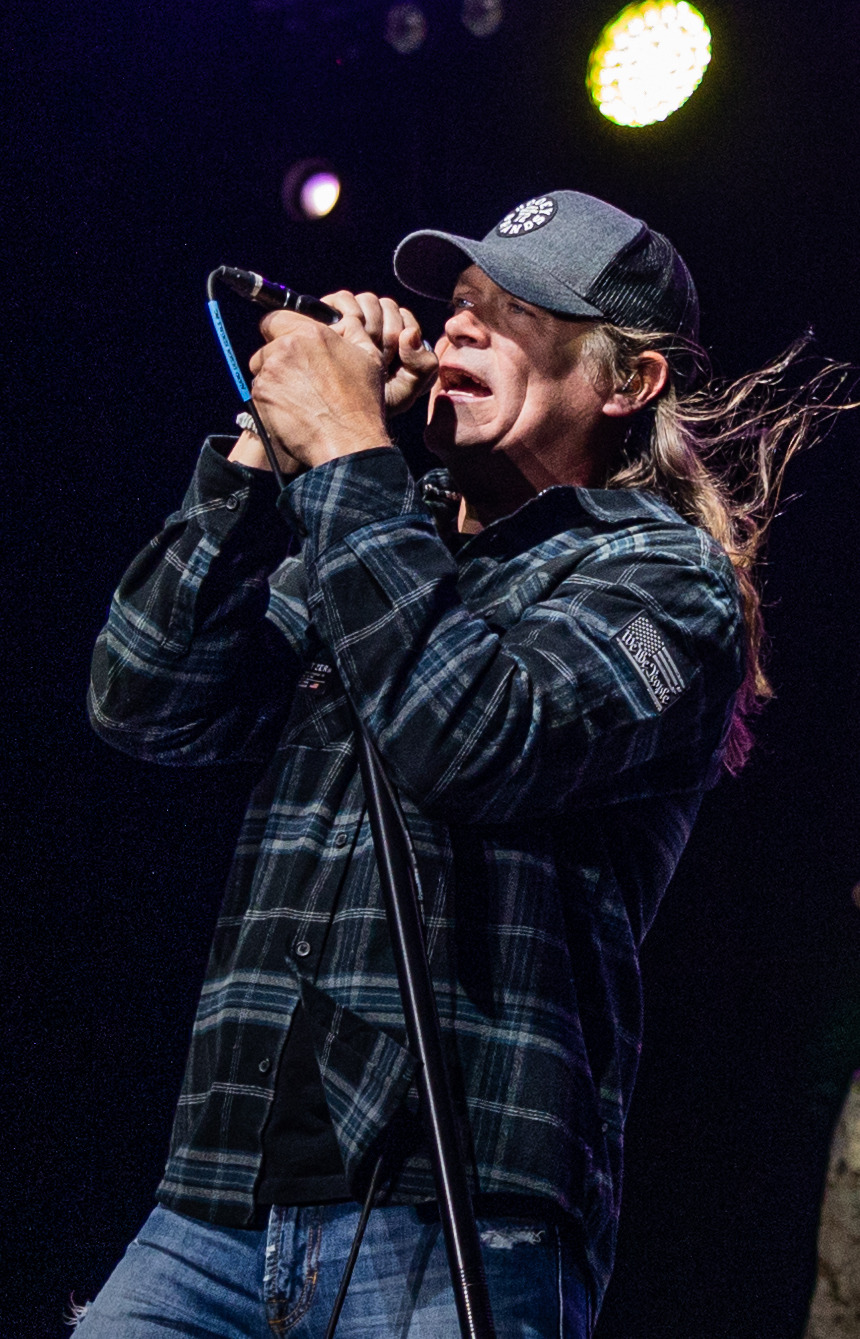
Brad Arnold

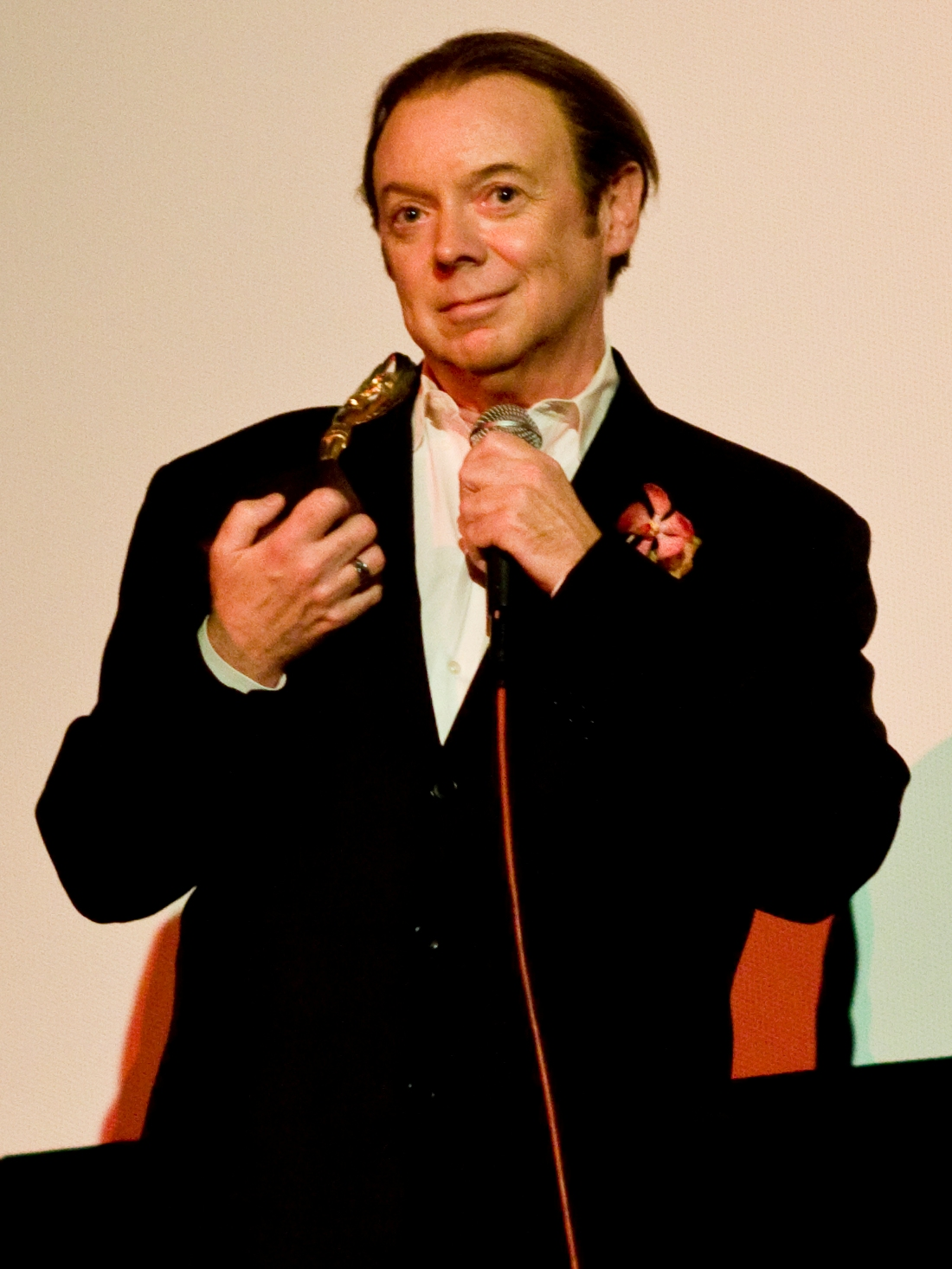
Bud Cort

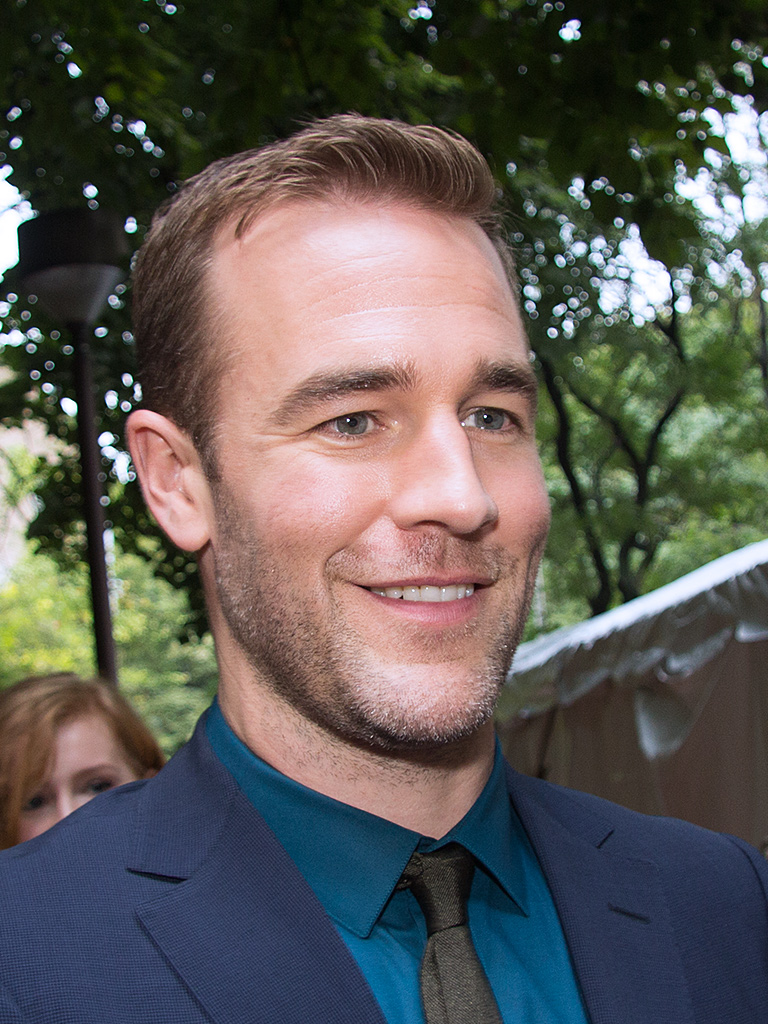
James Van Der Beek

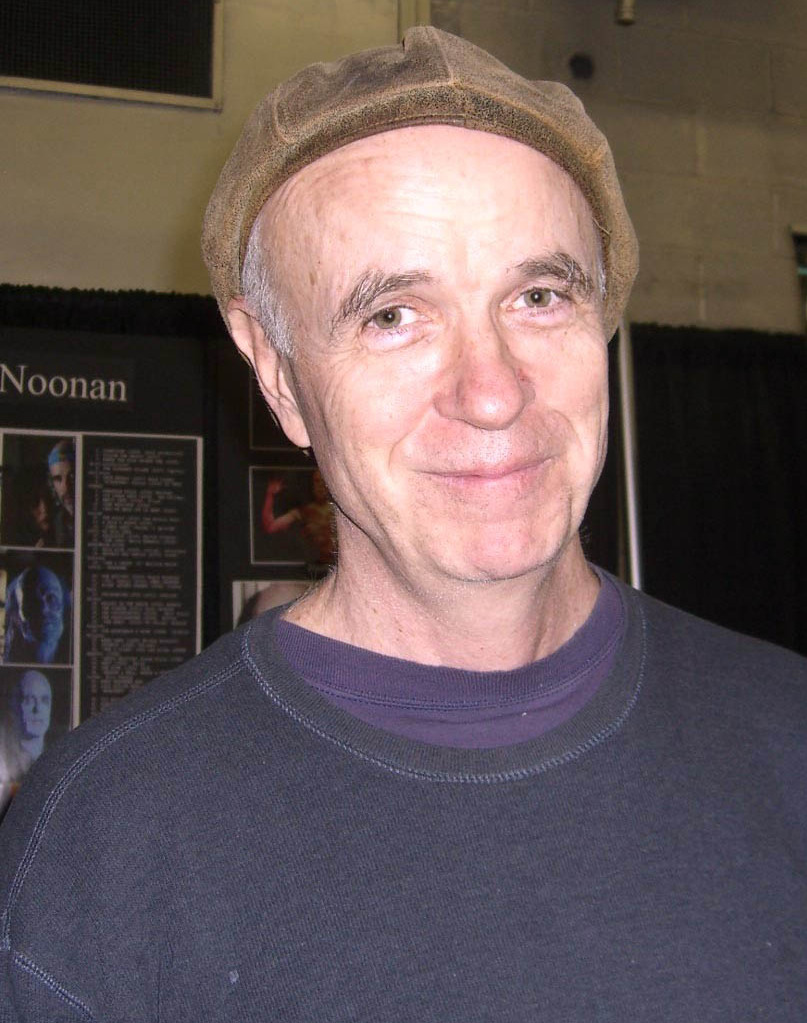
Tom Noonan

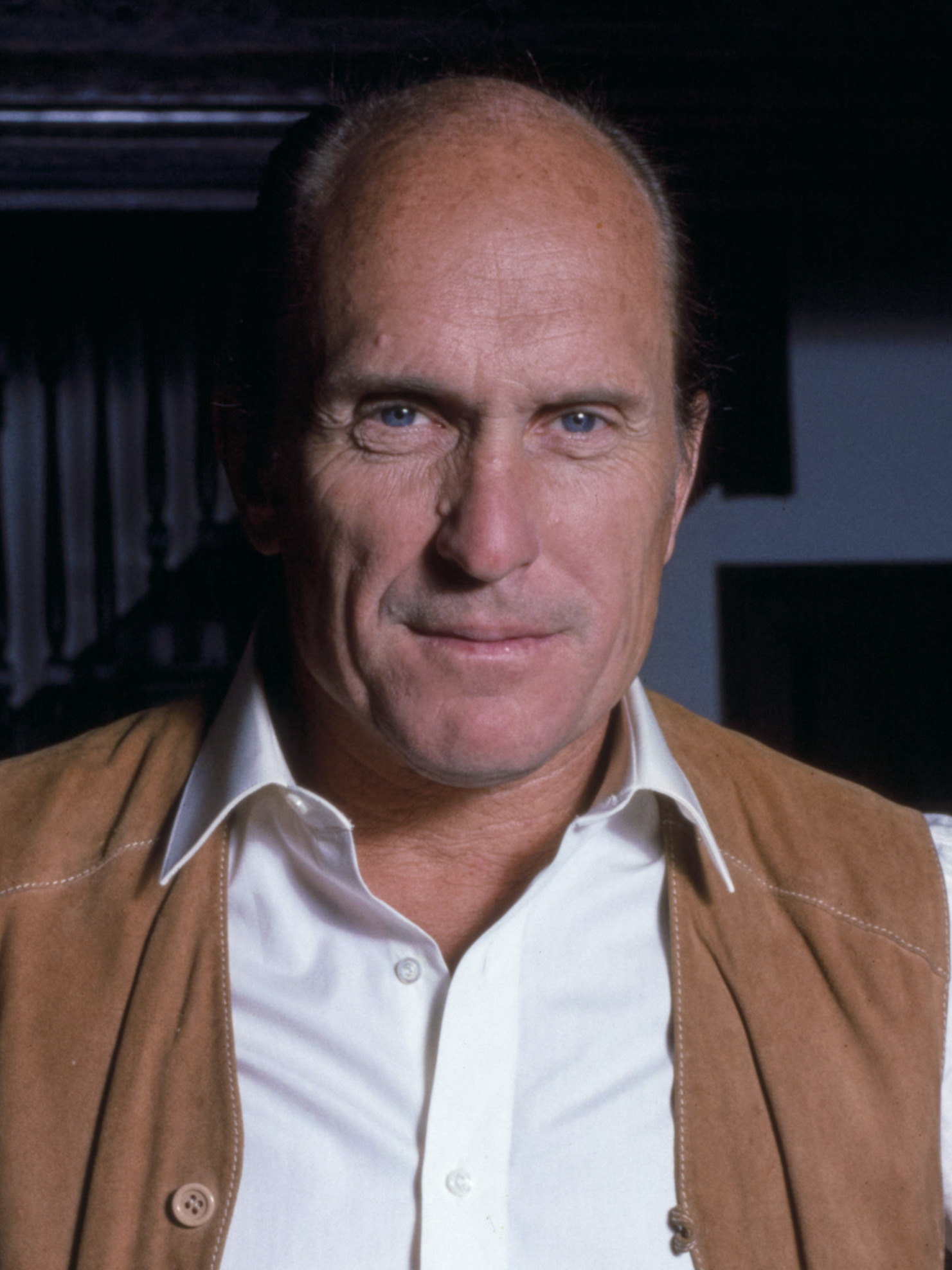
Robert Duvall

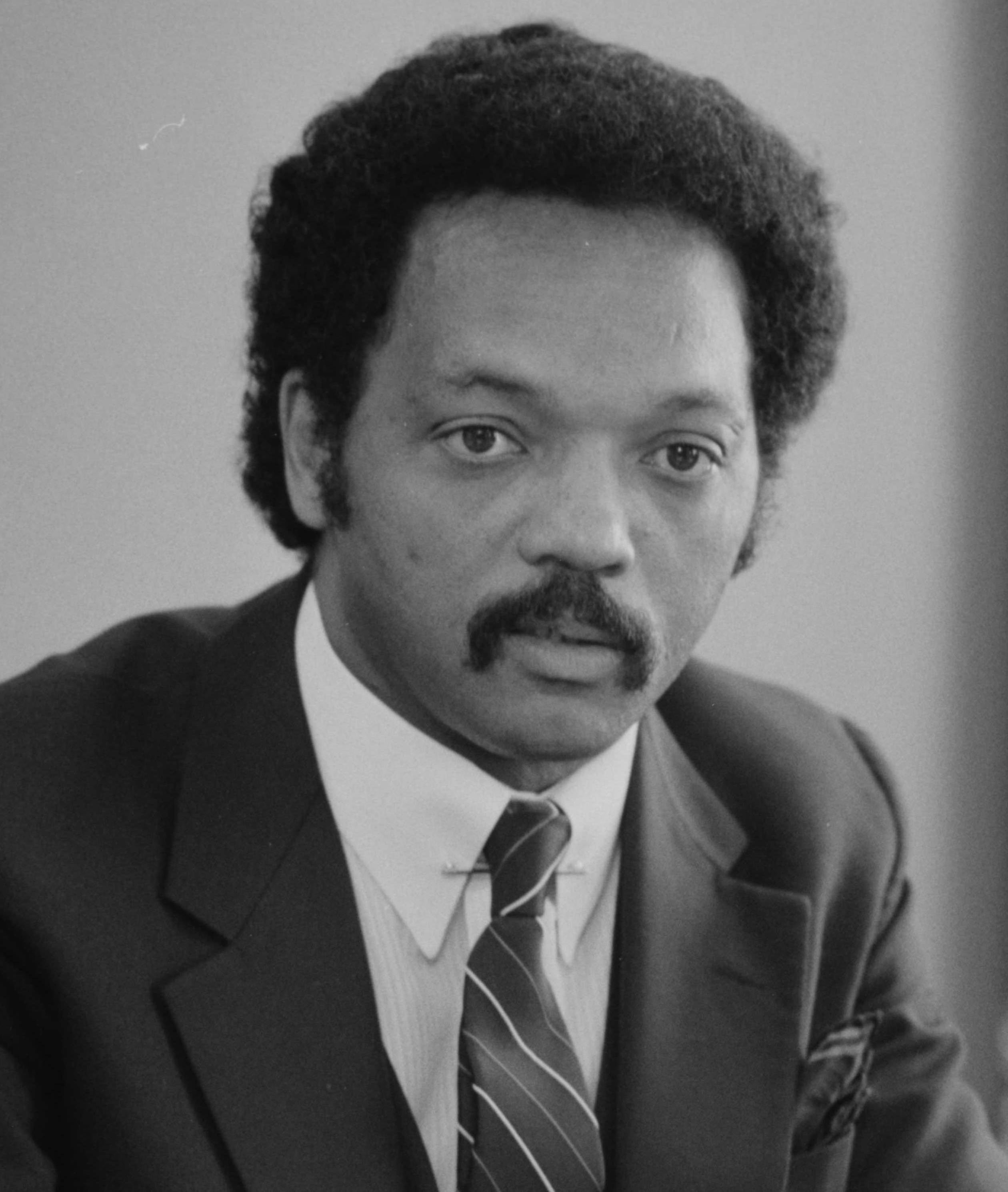
Jesse Jackson

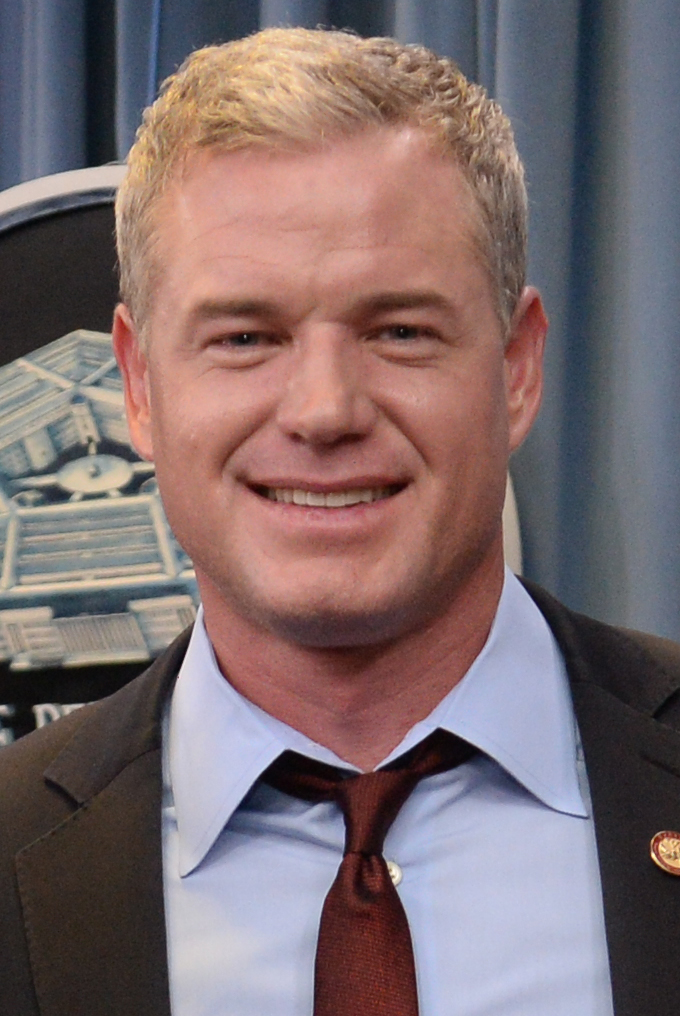
Eric Dane

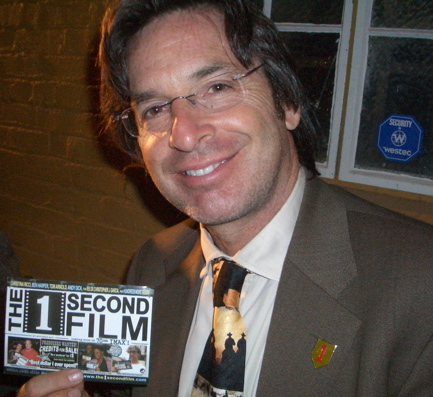
Robert Carradine

- February 1
  - Vicki Abt, 83, sociologist
  - Don Adams, 85, country singer
  - Swietlan Kraczyna, 85, painter
  - John F. Stewart, 99, politician, member of the Georgia House of Representatives (1965-1967)
  - Robert Tinney, 78, illustrator (Byte)
- February 2
  - Gabor Boritt, 86, historian
  - Frankie Cain, 93, professional wrestler
  - Daryl Hoole, 91, author and public speaker
  - Myra MacPherson, 91, journalist (The Washington Post), author and biographer
  - Bud Moore, 86, college football player (Alabama Crimson Tide) and coach (Kansas Jayhawks)
  - Chuck Negron, 83, singer (Three Dog Night)
  - Ken Peplowski, 66, jazz clarinetist and tenor saxophonist
  - Frank S. Royal, 86, physician, president of the National Medical Association (1981)
  - Sandra Schultz Newman, 87, judge, justice of the Pennsylvania Supreme Court (1996-2006)
  - Chuck Sullivan, 83, lawyer and sports executive (New England Patriots)
- February 3
  - J. Edward Anderson, 98, mechanical engineer
  - Elizabeth Barret, 74, documentary filmmaker (Stranger with a Camera)
  - Lee Hamilton, 94, politician, member of the U.S. House of Representatives (1965-1999) and vice-chair of the 9/11 Commission (2002-2004)
  - Reta Holden, 87, politician, member of the Mississippi House of Representatives (1992-1999)
  - Ron Kenoly, 81, Christian worship leader, singer and songwriter
  - Lamonte McLemore, 90, singer (The 5th Dimension)
  - Ruben Rodriguez, 60, football player (Seattle Seahawks)
  - Ron Teasley, 99, baseball player (New York Cubans)
- February 4
  - Tommy Crook, 81, guitarist
  - Ed Iskenderian, 104, Hall of Fame hot rodder and businessman
  - John Lofland, 79, sociologist (Doomsday Cult: A Study of Conversion, Proselytization, and Maintenance of Faith)
  - Mickey Lolich, 85, baseball player (Detroit Tigers, San Diego Padres, New York Mets), World Series champion (1968)
  - Lloyd Monsen, 94, soccer player (New York Americans, national team)
  - Ernest Morrell, 54, scholar and music executive
  - Margalit Oved, 96, Israeli-born dancer and choreographer
  - Charles Poindexter, 83, politician, member of the Virginia House of Delegates (2008-2022)
  - Jorge Ruffinelli, 82, Uruguayan literary critic and academic
  - Marie Woo, 97, Chinese-born ceramicist and educator
- February 5
  - Daniel Boyd, 69, filmmaker and academic
  - Greg Brown, 56, musician (Cake, Deathray) and songwriter ("The Distance")
  - Jeff Griffin, 81, politician
  - Ray Handley, 81, football coach (New York Giants)
  - Henry G. Lackey, 78, politician, member of the Kentucky Senate (1982-1987, 1991-1995)
  - Richard W. Mansbach, 83, political scientist
  - Troy Poteete, 70, Cherokee politician
  - Fred Smith, 77, bassist (Television, Blondie)
  - Alan Trustman, 95, screenwriter (Bullitt, The Thomas Crown Affair, They Call Me Mister Tibbs!)
  - Henry Viccellio Jr., 85, Air Force general
  - Stanley Zdonik, 78, computer scientist and academic
- February 6
  - Afleet Alex, 23, Thoroughbred racehorse, Preakness Stakes winner (2005), Belmont Stakes winner (2005)
  - Jeffrey Carver, 76, science fiction author (The Rapture Effect)
  - Terrance Gore, 34, baseball player (Kansas City Royals, Chicago Cubs, Atlanta Braves), World Series champion (2015, 2021)
  - Sonny Jurgensen, 91, Hall of Fame football player (Philadelphia Eagles, Washington Redskins), NFL champion (1960)
  - Robert J. Plemmons, 87, mathematician
  - George R. Rossman, 81, mineralogist and academic
  - John Wheeler, 95, actor (Sgt. Pepper's Lonely Hearts Club Band, The Dukes of Hazzard, Green Acres)
  - Barry Wilburn, 62, football player (Washington Redskins, Philadelphia Eagles)
- February 7
  - Brad Arnold, 47, singer (3 Doors Down) and songwriter ("Kryptonite", "Here Without You")
  - Gary Blaylock, 94, baseball player (St. Louis Cardinals, New York Yankees) and coach (Kansas City Royals)
  - David J. Farber, 91, computer scientist (SNOBOL)
  - John Flanagan, 81, Australian fantasy author (Ranger's Apprentice)
  - Clyde Maughan, 99, electrical engineer
  - William B. Steele, 96, major general
  - Cabell Tennis, 93, Episcopal prelate, bishop of Delaware (1986-1997)
  - Gabriel P. Weisberg, 83, art historian and educator
- February 8
  - Lynn Bolles, 76, anthropologist
  - Owen Donohoe, 80, politician, member of the Kansas House of Representatives (2007-2013, 2019-2024)
  - Terry Fields, 66, politician, member of the Florida House of Representatives (2000-2008)
  - Kirk Francis, 78, sound engineer (The Bourne Ultimatum, L.A. Confidential, The Tree of Life), Oscar winner (2008)
  - Blake Garrett, 33, actor (How to Eat Fried Worms)
- February 9
  - Alex Caldiero, 76, poet
  - Robert Daverman, 84, topologist
  - William Flatt, 94, animal and nutritional scientist
  - Chris Gilbert, 79, Hall of Fame football player (Texas Longhorns)
  - Garland Green, 83, soul singer and pianist
  - Bobby Henrich, 87, baseball player (Cincinnati Redlegs/Reds)
  - Phil Krueger, 74, racing driver
  - Don Nigro, 76, playwright
  - András Riedlmayer, 79, Hungarian-born art historian
  - Tracy Scroggins, 56, football player (Detroit Lions)
- February 10
  - Ed Crane, 81, libertarian activist, co-founder of the Cato Institute
  - Shelly Desai, 90, actor (Men of a Certain Age, Here Comes the Boom, It's Always Sunny in Philadelphia)
  - King T. Leatherbury, 92, Hall of Fame racehorse trainer (Ben's Cat)
  - Mark Smith, 51, football player (Arizona Cardinals, Cleveland Browns)
- February 11
  - Dean G. Auten, 88, politician, member of the Georgia House of Representatives (1977-1986)
  - Theodore Seio Chihara, 96, mathematician
  - Edwin G. Corr, 91, diplomat, ambassador to Peru (1980-1981), Bolivia (1981-1985) and El Salvador (1985-1988)
  - Bud Cort, 77, actor (Harold and Maude, Brewster McCloud, The Life Aquatic with Steve Zissou)
  - Jeffrey Evangelos, 73, politician, member of the Maine House of Representatives (2012-2016, 2018-2022)
  - Ed Graczyk, 84, playwright
  - Jerry Kennedy, 85, record producer, songwriter and guitarist
  - George Quincey Lumsden Jr., 95, diplomat, ambassador to the United Arab Emirates (1982-1986)
  - William Nyhan, 99, physician
  - Michael Proctor, 58, football player (Murray State Racers, Saskatchewan Roughriders)
  - David Heywood Swartz, 83, diplomat, ambassador to Belarus (1992-1994)
  - James Van Der Beek, 48, actor (Dawson's Creek, Varsity Blues, The Rules of Attraction)
- February 12
  - George Bunting, 81, politician, member of the Delaware Senate (1996-2013)
  - Pat Collins, 84, football coach (Northeast Louisiana Indians)
  - Roy Face, 97, baseball player (Pittsburgh Pirates, Montreal Expos, Detroit Tigers), World Series champion (1960)
  - Giovanni Fazio, 92, physicist
  - Fredric Kroll, 81, German-born composer and writer
  - Joe Nossek, 85, baseball player (Minnesota Twins) and coach
  - John Shirreffs, 80, racehorse trainer (Giacomo, Zenyatta, A.P. Warrior)
  - Walter Wise, 74, labor union leader
- February 13
  - Joseph Halpern, 72, Israeli-born computer scientist
  - James Specht, 80-81, agronomist
- February 14
  - Harry Bean, 71, politician, member of the New Hampshire House of Representatives (since 2018)
  - Elaine J. Coates, 88, social worker and educator
  - Edward L. Deci, 83, psychologist
  - Susan George, 91,-French political and social scientist, activist and writer
  - David Harpp, 89, chemist and science communicator
  - Tom Noonan, 74, actor (Manhunter, Synecdoche, New York, Damages)
  - Michael Silverblatt, 73, literary critic and broadcaster (Bookworm)
  - Joe Stowell, 99, basketball player and coach (Bradley Braves)
- February 15
  - Paul Brainerd, 78, businessman (Aldus Corporation)
  - Neal Dahlen, 85, football executive (Denver Broncos) and administrator (Denver Broncos, San Francisco 49ers)
  - Robert Duvall, 95, actor (The Godfather, Apocalypse Now, Tender Mercies), Oscar winner (1984)
  - Tre' Johnson, 54, football player (Washington Redskins, Cleveland Browns)
  - Guenter B. Risse, 93, medical historian
  - James G. Robinson, 90, film producer (Ace Ventura: Pet Detective, The Good Shepherd), co-founder of Morgan Creek Entertainment
  - John Viola, 75, politician, member of the Delaware House of Representatives (1998-2020)
  - Christopher S. Wren, 89, journalist (The New York Times) and author
- February 16
  - Jane Baer, 91, animator (Who Framed Roger Rabbit, The Black Cauldron, Rover Dangerfield)
  - George W. Barber, 85, museum owner and philanthropist
  - Ancella Bickley, 95, historian
  - Avel Gordly, 79, politician, member of the Oregon Senate (1997-2009)
  - Elaine Ingham, 73, microbiologist
  - Bo Lamar, 74, basketball player (Southwestern Louisiana Ragin' Cajuns, San Diego Conquistadors, Los Angeles Lakers)
  - Gail R. Martin, 81, biologist
  - Richard Ottinger, 97, politician and lawyer, member of the U.S. House of Representatives (1965-1971, 1975-1985), dean of the Pace University School of Law (1994-1999)
  - Linda Seger, 80, author and script consultant
  - Billy Steinberg, 75, songwriter ("Like a Virgin", "True Colors", "Eternal Flame")
  - Frederick Wiseman, 96, filmmaker (Titicut Follies, Welfare, In Jackson Heights)
- February 17
  - Wolfgang F. Danspeckgruber, 70, Austrian-born academic
  - David Hays, 95, scenic and lighting designer
  - Edward Hoagland, 93, author (Heart's Desire)
  - Jesse Jackson, 84, civil rights activist and politician, founder of Rainbow/PUSH
  - William Milam, 89, diplomat, ambassador to Bangladesh (1990-1993) and Pakistan (1998-2001)
  - Doug Moe, 87, basketball player (Oakland Oaks, Carolina Cougars) and coach (Denver Nuggets)
  - Ray Reach, 77, musician, composer and convicted pedophile
  - Susan Sheehan, 88, author (Is There No Place on Earth for Me?)
  - Richard Stika, 68, Roman Catholic prelate, bishop of Knoxville (2009-2023)
  - Scott Tinsley, 62, football coach (West Virginia State Yellow Jackets, West Virginia Tech Golden Bears)
- February 18
  - Chester Clem, 88, politician, member of the Florida House of Representatives (1972-1976)
  - Norman Francis, 94, academic administrator, president of Xavier University of Louisiana (1968-2015) and chairman of the Louisiana Recovery Authority
  - Karen Glaser, 71, underwater photographer
  - Lil Poppa, 25, rapper
  - Carl Marcellino, 83, politician, member of the New York Senate (1995-2018)
  - Mike Wagner, 76, football player (Pittsburgh Steelers), four-time Super Bowl champion
- February 19
  - Joanne Bland, 72, civil rights activist, co-founder of the National Voting Rights Museum
  - William M. Bugg, 95, physicist
  - Derrick Clark, 54, football player (Denver Broncos)
  - Eric Dane, 53, actor (Grey's Anatomy, The Last Ship, Euphoria)
  - Barry Knight, 71, politician, member of the Virginia House of Delegates (since 2009)
  - Isaiah Zagar, 86, mosaic artist
- February 20
  - Frank Booker, 61, basketball player (Bowling Green Falcons, Valur, Grindavík)
  - Layton Freborg, 92, politician, member of the North Dakota House of Representatives (1973-1976, 1979-1982) and Senate (1985-2012)
  - Joseph L. Green, 95, science fiction author (Gold the Man)
  - Johnny Johns, 74, figure skater and coach
  - William Q. MacLean Jr., 91, politician, member of the Massachusetts House of Representatives (1961-1981) and Senate (1981-1993)
  - Bill Mazeroski, 89, Hall of Fame baseball player (Pittsburgh Pirates), World Series champion (1960, 1971)
  - Rod Monroe, 83, politician, member of the Oregon House of Representatives (1977-1981) and Senate (1981-1989, 2007-2019)
  - Aron Stewart, 75, basketball player (Richmond Spiders)
  - Tom Vickers, 89, politician, member of the Nebraska Legislature (1979-1987)
- February 21
  - Kara Braxton, 43, basketball player (Detroit Shock, New York Liberty)
  - Willie Colón, 75, salsa musician ("Pedro Navaja") and actor (Vigilante, The Last Fight)
  - Richard Felciano, 95, composer
  - Guyle Fielder, 95, American-born Canadian ice hockey player (Chicago Black Hawks, Detroit Red Wings, Seattle Totems)
  - Cliff Guffey, 76, labor union leader, president of the APWU (2010-2013)
  - Arthur Lampkin, 87, English motorcycle racer
  - Melody McCray-Miller, 69, politician, member of the Kansas House of Representatives (2005-2013)
  - Rondale Moore, 25, football player (Purdue Boilermakers, Arizona Cardinals)
  - Walter Pawelkiewicz, 77, German-born politician
  - Karen Shaw Petrou, 72, financial analyst
  - Dean Schrempp, 90, politician, member of the South Dakota House of Representatives (1993–1995, 1997–1999, 2009–2017)
  - Dan Simmons, 77, science fiction and horror writer (Hyperion, The Fall of Hyperion, Song of Kali)
  - Phil Sobocinski, 80, football player (Atlanta Falcons)
  - Hans-Dieter Sues, 70, German-born paleontologist
- February 22
  - Iris Cantor, 95, philanthropist
  - Doctor R. Crants, 81, businessman, co-founder of CoreCivic
  - Joan Huber, 100, sociologist
  - Luci4, 23, rapper
  - Ardis E. Parshall, 66, historian
  - Eugene G. Sander, 90, academic
  - Ronyell Whitaker, 46, football player (Tampa Bay Buccaneers, Rhein Fire, Minnesota Vikings)
- February 23
  - Coleman Barks, 88, poet and writer
  - Robert Carradine, 71, actor (Revenge of the Nerds, The Big Red One, Lizzie McGuire)
  - David Chadwick, 81, Zen Buddhist priest and writer
  - Charles Dean, 86, politician, member of the Florida House of Representatives (2002-2007) and Senate (2007-2016)
  - Gary Dontzig, 79, television producer (Murphy Brown, Suddenly Susan, Becker), Emmy winner (1991)
  - Bobby Douglas, 83, Olympic wrestler (1964, 1968)
  - Ulysses Jenkins, 79, visual artist
  - Stephanie Kugelman, 78, advertising executive
  - Sondra Lee, 97, actress (Hello, Dolly!, Peter Pan, Sunday in New York) and singer
  - Richard Mauer, 76, investigative journalist
  - Monti Rock III, 86, singer (Disco-Tex and the Sex-O-Lettes) and actor (Saturday Night Fever)
- February 24
  - Uncle Joe Benson, 76, rock radio DJ (KLOS)
  - Ruben Castillo, 68, boxer
  - Lauren Chapin, 80, actress (Father Knows Best)
  - Ann Godoff, 76, editor and publisher
  - Oliver "Power" Grant, 52, clothing manufacturer and music producer (Wu-Tang Clan)
  - Rex Lee Jim, 63, Navajo politician, member of the Navajo Nation Council (2003-2011)
  - Stephen Koch, 84, writer
  - Jeremy Larner, 88, author and screenwriter (The Candidate, Drive, He Said), Oscar winner (1973)
  - Maria O'Brien, 75, actress (Smile, Table for Five, Protocol) and acting coach
  - Lorin N. Pace, 100, politician, member of the Utah House of Representatives (1964-1986) and Senate (1986-1991)
  - Carl Samuelson, 94, swim coach (Williams College)
- February 25
  - Dick Absher, 81, football player (New Orleans Saints, Atlanta Falcons, Philadelphia Eagles)
  - Bobby J. Brown, 62, actor (The Wire, We Own This City, The Corner)
  - William E. Connolly, 88, political theorist
  - Charlie Smith Dannelly, 101, politician, member of the North Carolina Senate (1994-2013)
  - Bruce Froemming, 86, baseball umpire
  - Jeff Galloway, 80, Olympic runner (1972)
  - Wayne Granger, 81, baseball player (Cincinnati Reds)
  - Phil Ryan, 80, Texas Ranger
  - Carol Walker, 90, mathematician
- February 26
  - Carl H. Brans, 90, mathematical physicist
  - Karl Dempwolf, 86, Dutch-born painter
  - Craig Johnson, 72, politician, member of the Alaska House of Representatives (2007-2017, 2023-2025)
  - Devonta Lee, 27, football player (LSU Tigers, Louisiana Tech Bulldogs)
  - Tyrone G. Martin, 95, navy commander and naval historian
  - Bevan Morris, 76, Australian-born academic and politician
  - Roscoe Robinson, 97, gospel and soul singer
  - David H. Waldeck, 69, chemist
- February 27
  - David Botstein, 83, biologist
  - John H. Caldwell, 97, Olympic skier (1952) and author
  - Eddie Germano, 101, cartoonist (The Boston Globe)
  - Peter J. Genova, 81, politician, member of the New Jersey General Assembly (1985-1990)
  - Sonny Gibbs, 86, football player (Dallas Cowboys, Detroit Lions)
  - Bo Gritz, 87, lieutenant colonel and politician, inspiration for John Rambo
  - Colman McCarthy, 87, journalist (The Washington Post) and peace activist
  - Neil Sedaka, 86, singer ("Breaking Up Is Hard to Do", "Laughter in the Rain") and songwriter ("Love Will Keep Us Together")
  - James E. Waggoner Jr., 77, Episcopalian clergyman, bishop of Spokane (2000-2017)
  - Travis Wammack, 81, rock and roll guitarist
  - Tatjana Wood, 99, German-born comic book artist (Camelot 3000, Swamp Thing, Animal Man)
- February 28
  - Steven P. Brennan, 59, set dresser (The Last Samurai, John Wick: Chapter 2, Shutter Island), complications from amyotrophic lateral sclerosis
  - John P. Hammond, 83, blues singer and guitarist
  - Larry Kump, 78, politician, member of the West Virginia House of Delegates (2010-2014, 2018-2020, since 2022)
  - Don McCune, 89, ten-pin bowler
  - Charles S. Russell, 100, lawyer and judge
  - Annabel Schofield, 62, Welsh-born model and actress (Dallas)

== March ==
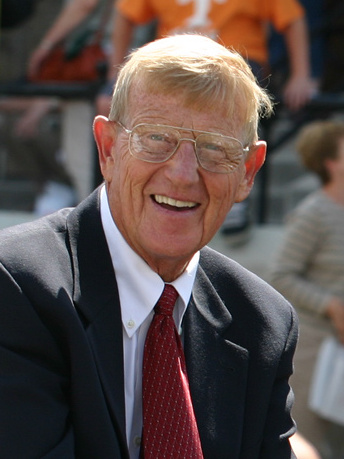
Lou Holtz

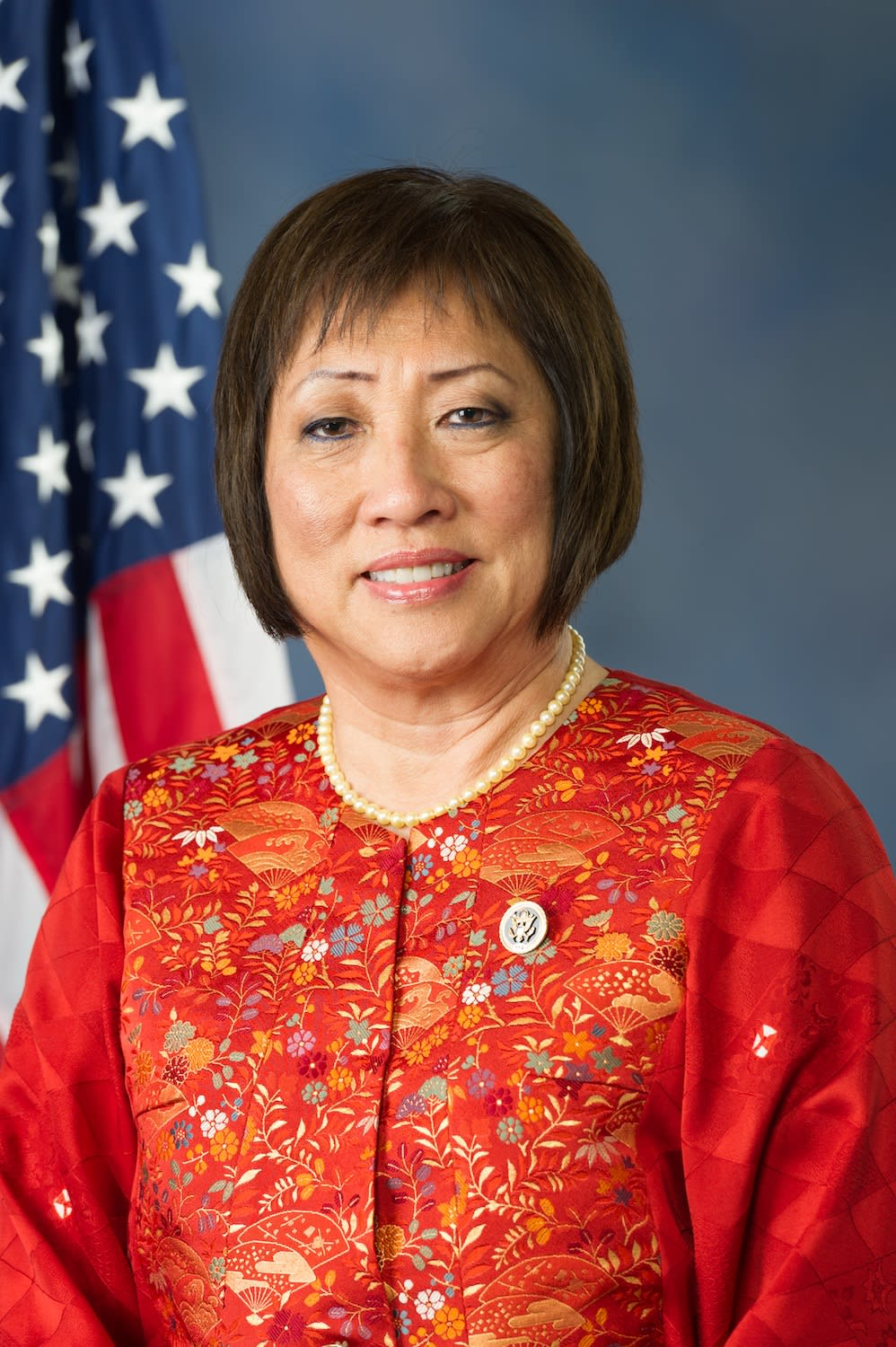
Colleen Hanabusa

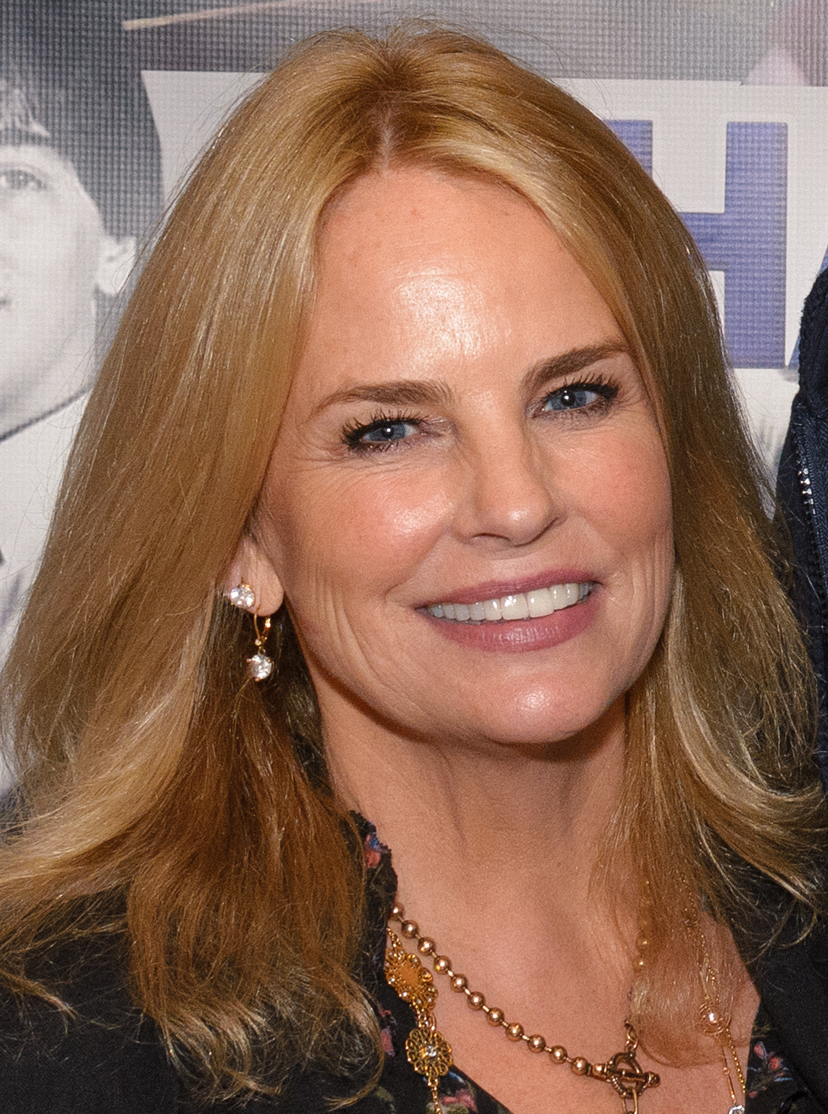
Jennifer Runyon

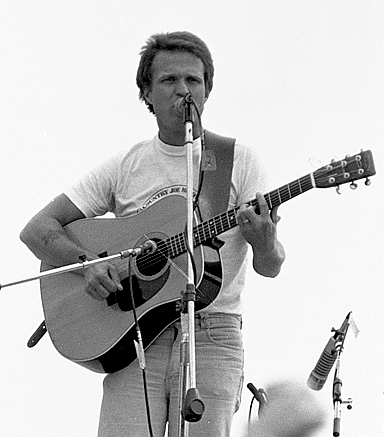
Country Joe McDonald

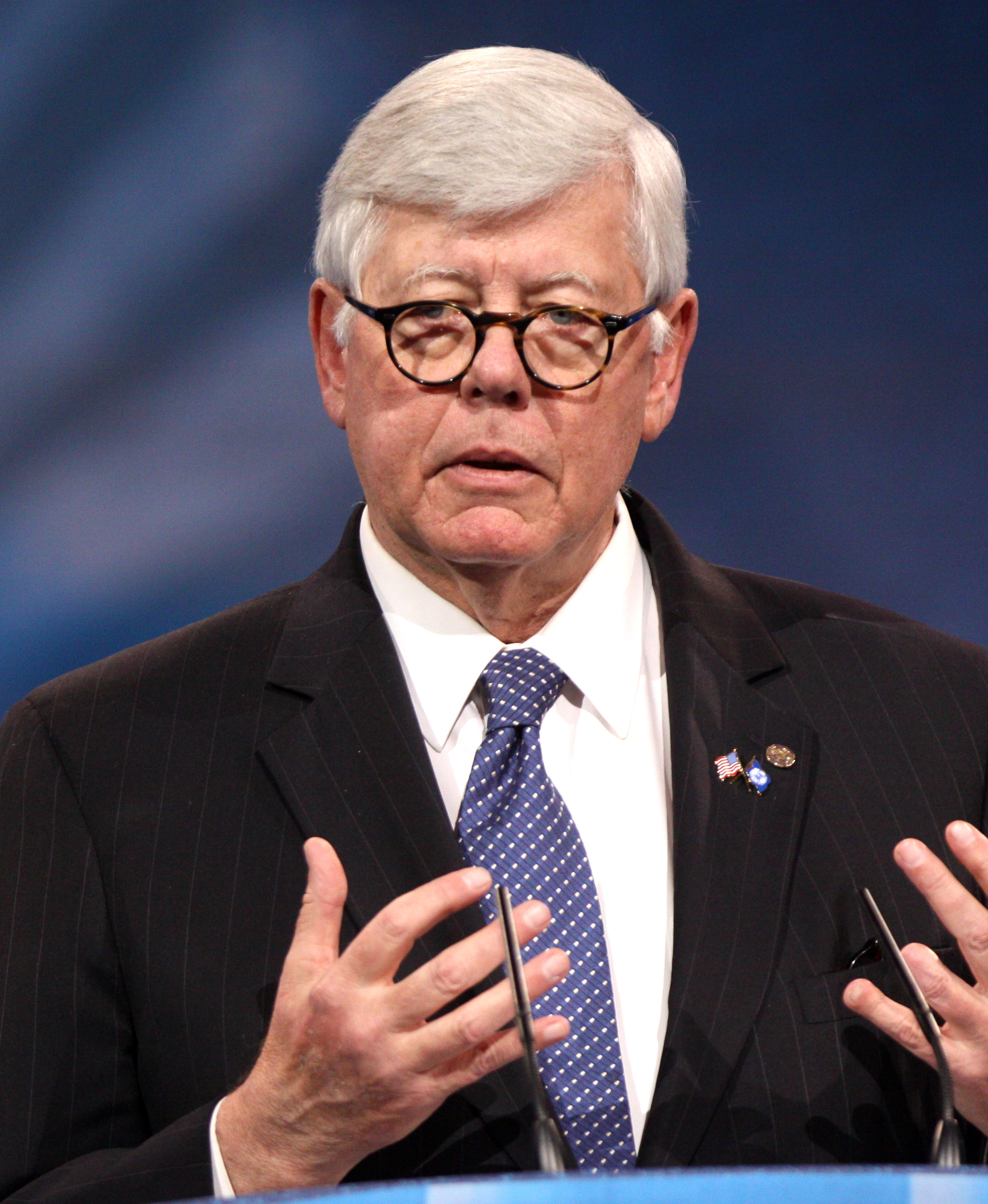
David Keene

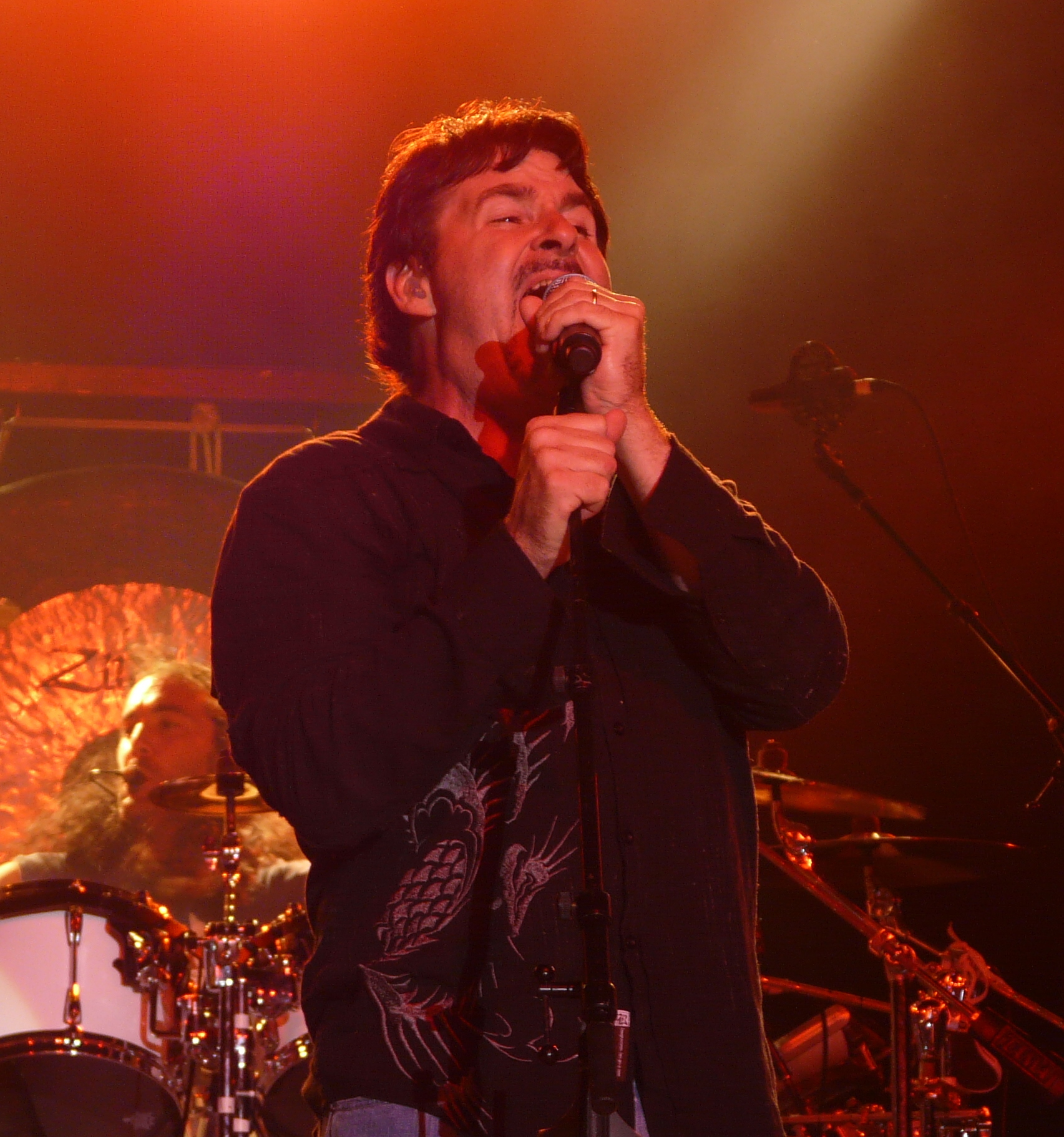
Tommy DeCarlo

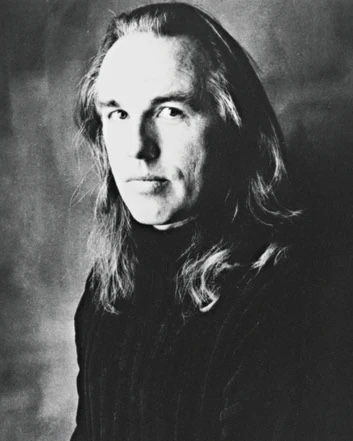
Michael Hague

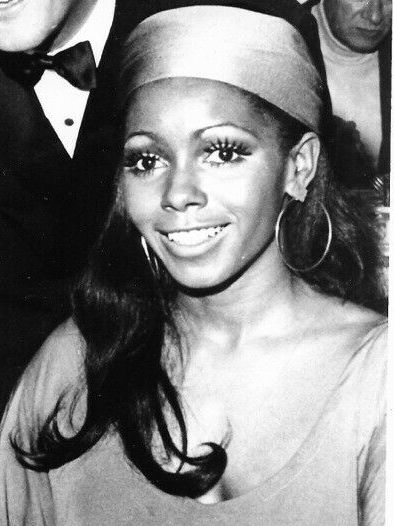
Judy Pace

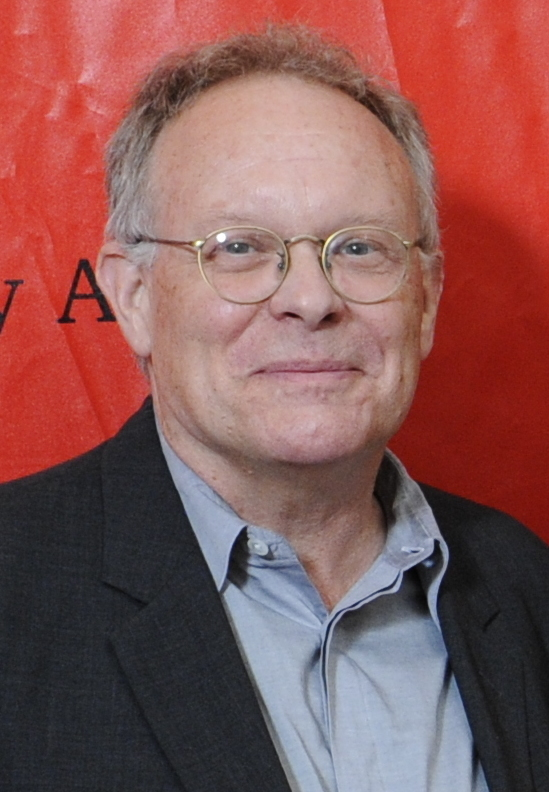
Eric Overmyer

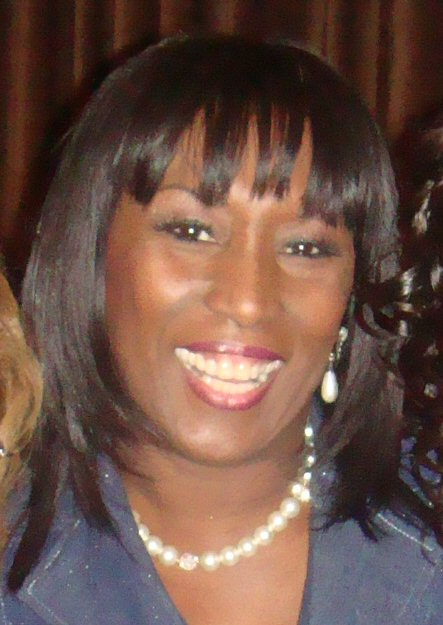
Kiki Shepard

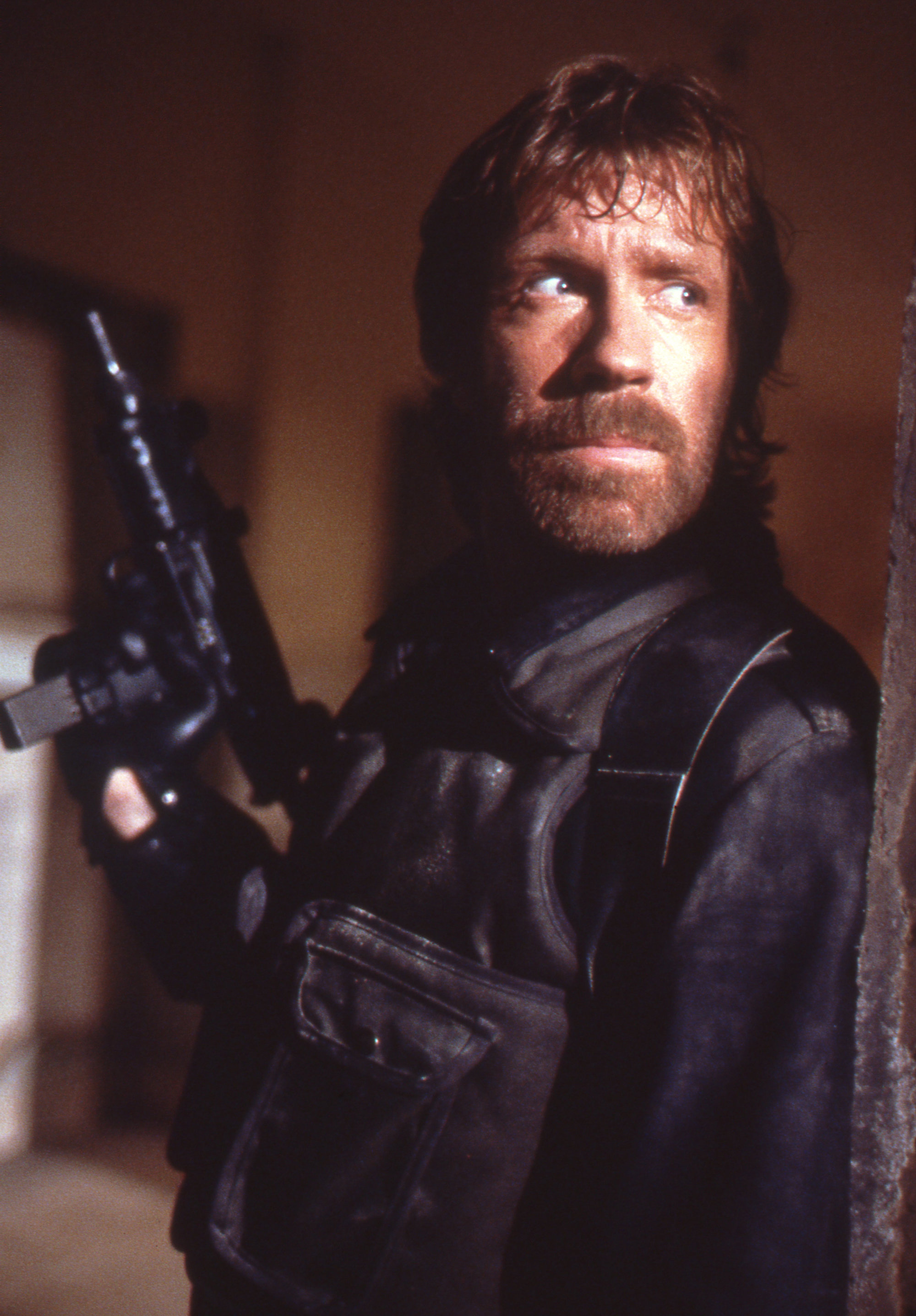
Chuck Norris

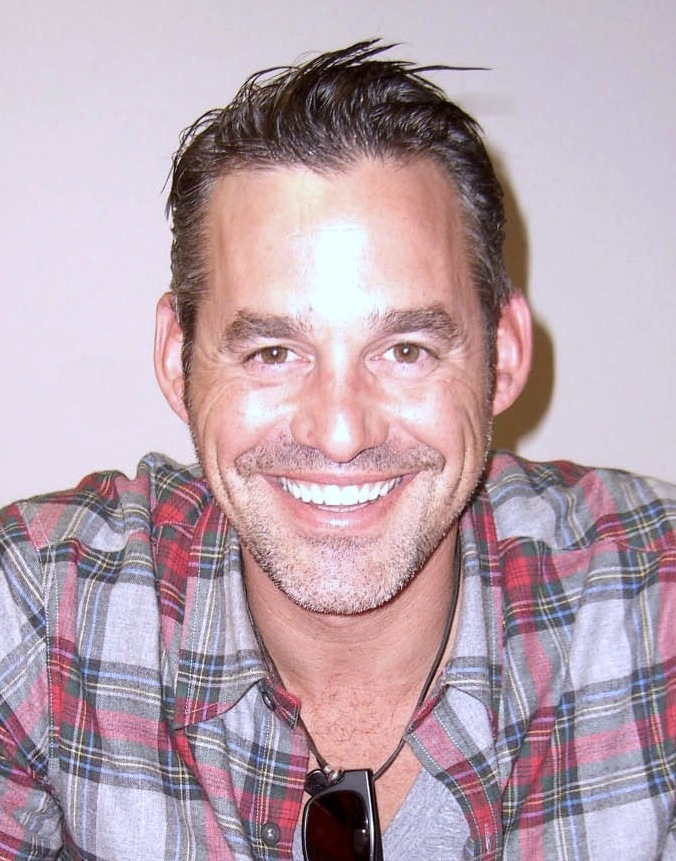
Nicholas Brendon

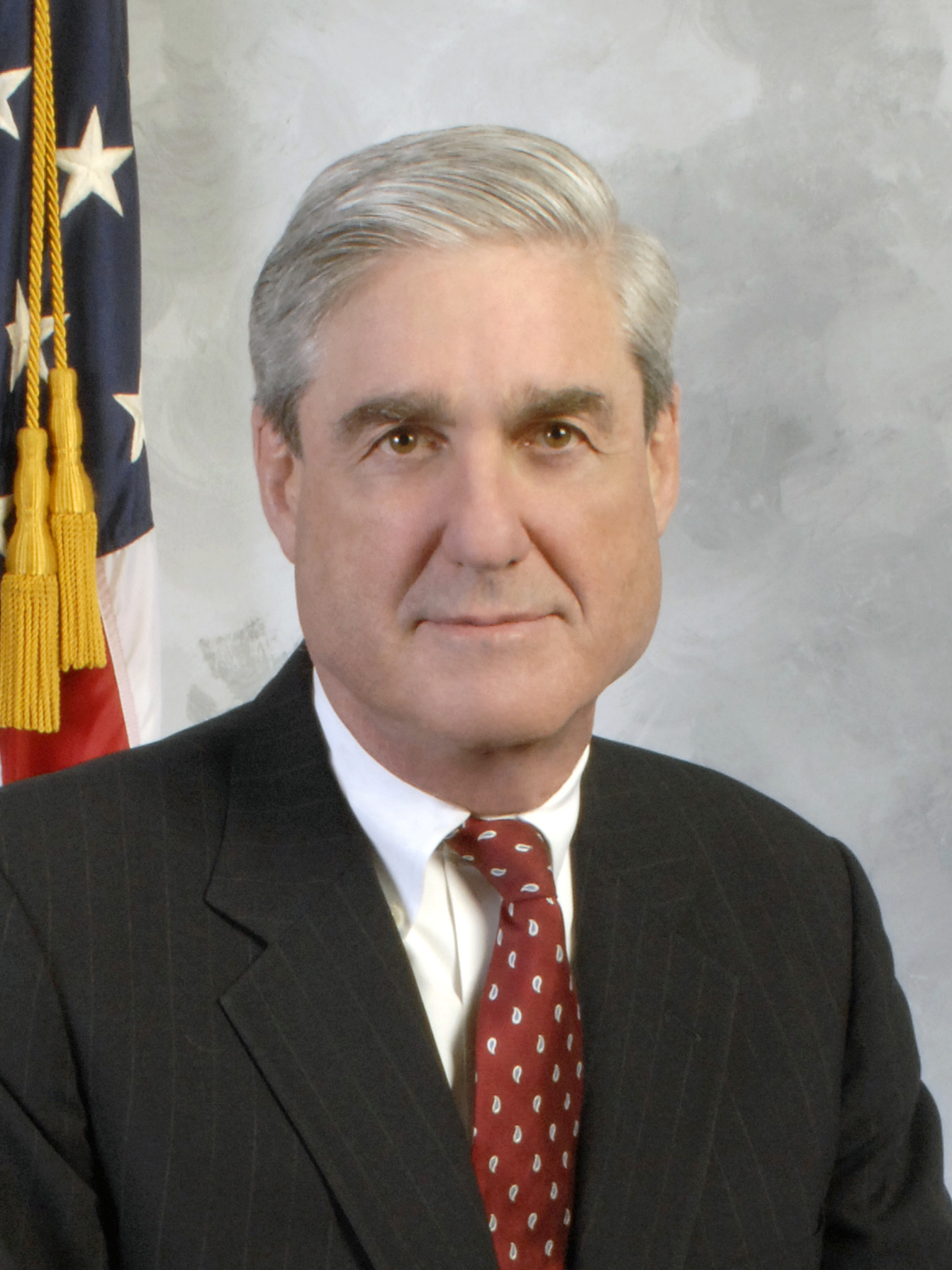
Robert Mueller

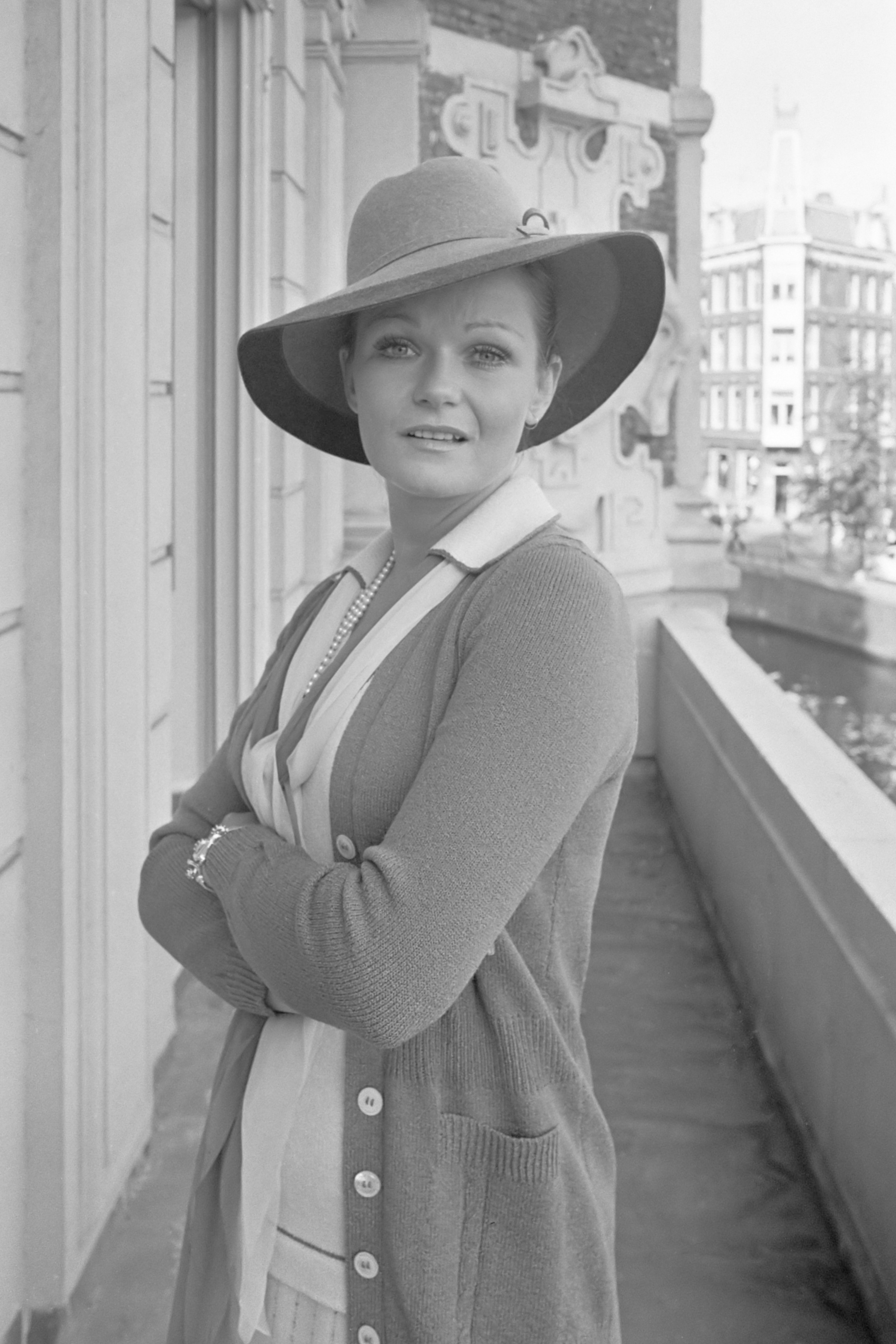
Valerie Perrine

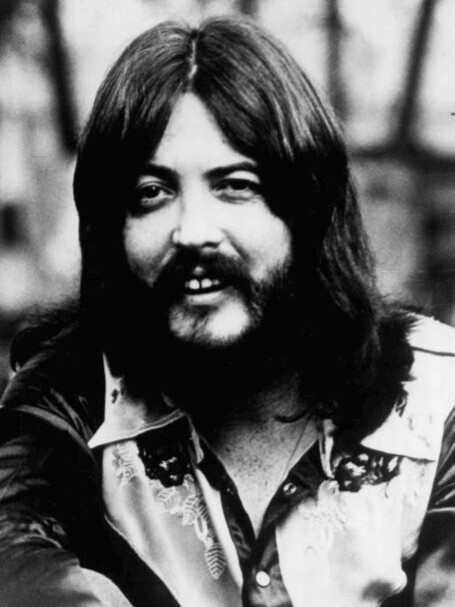
Dash Crofts

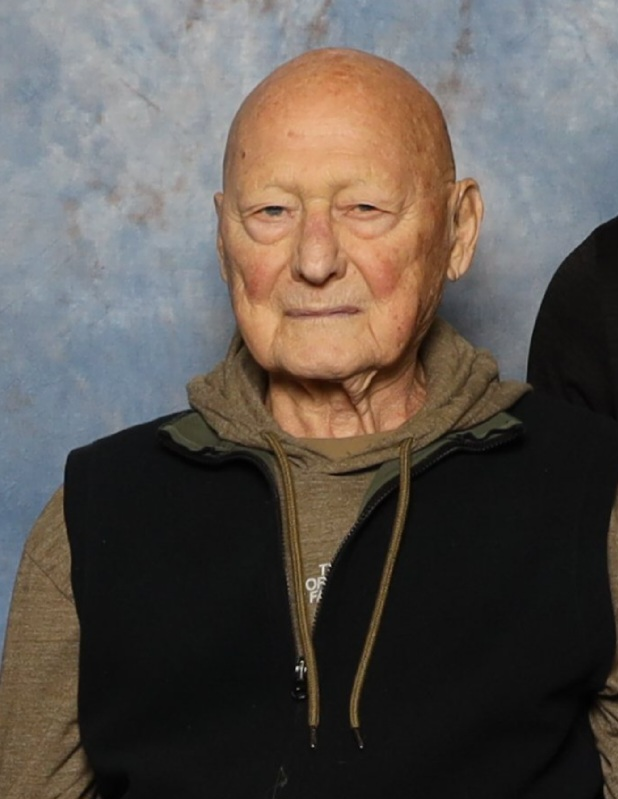
James Tolkan

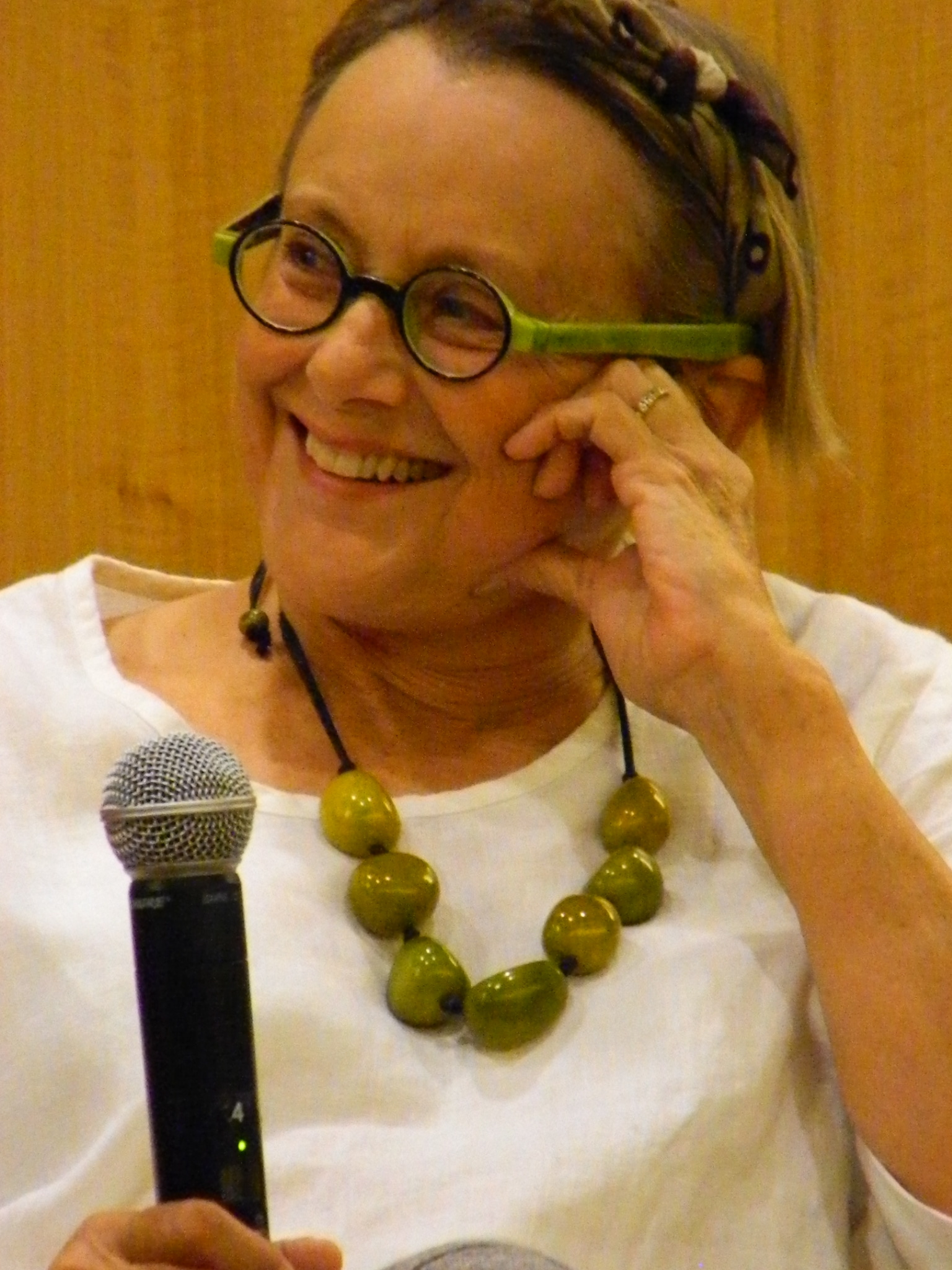
Mary Beth Hurt

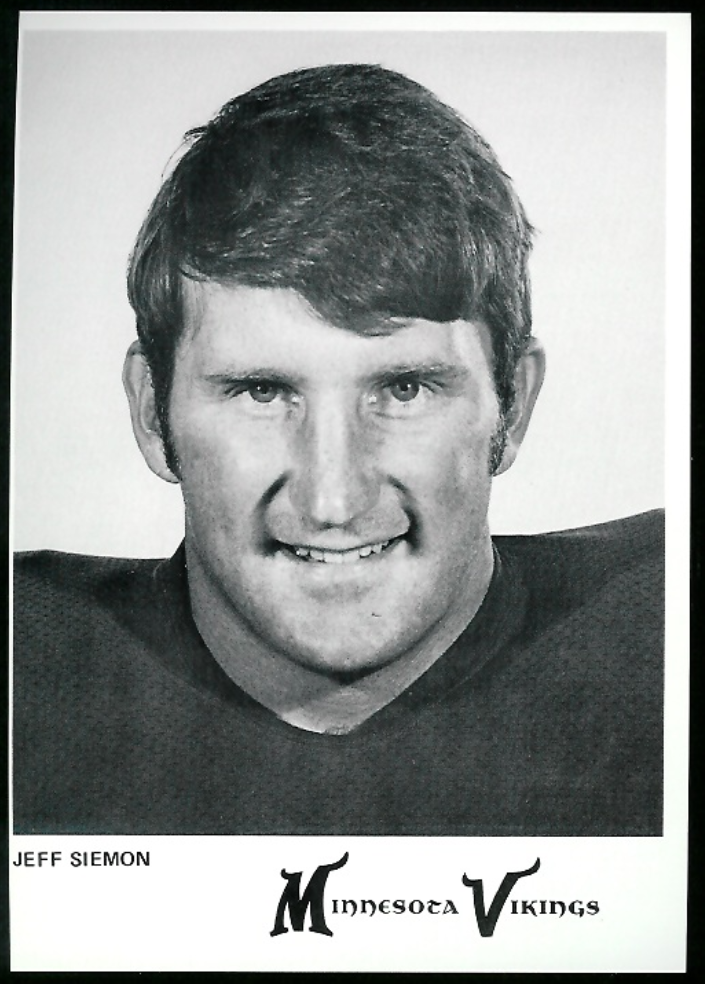
Jeff Siemon

- March 1
  - Mark Bittner, 74, writer
  - Dagfinn Føllesdal, 93, Norwegian-born academic and philosopher
  - Kermit Gosnell, 85, serial killer
  - Suzanne Gunzburger, 86, activist
  - Christine Johnson McPhail, 80, academic administrator, president of St. Augustine's University (2021-2023)
  - Bob Power, 74, record producer and audio engineer
  - Gary Walker, 83, musician (The Standells, The Walker Brothers)
- March 2
  - Sidney Dorsey, 86, sheriff and convicted murderer
  - Stephen Hibbert, 68, actor (Pulp Fiction, True Jackson, VP) and television writer (Late Night with David Letterman)
  - Timothy D. Leonard, 86, politician and jurist, member of the Oklahoma Senate (1979-1988), judge of the U.S. District Court for the Western District of Oklahoma (since 1992)
  - Daniel Migliore, 90, theologian
  - Chase Pistone, 42, racing driver
  - Billy Rafter, 96, stock car driver
  - John Resman, 70, politician, member of the Kansas House of Representatives (since 2017)
  - Diamond Dave Whitaker, 88, poet and activist
- March 3
  - Roy Book Binder, 82, blues musician
  - David Eugene Fellhauer, 86, Roman Catholic prelate, bishop of Victoria in Texas (1990-2015)
  - Alvin Greene, 48, politician
  - Robert Hinkle, 95, stuntman (Bronco Buster) and actor (Hud, Gunsmoke)
  - Billy Leon Kearse, 53, convicted murderer (b. 1972)
  - Carol Kitman, 96, photographer
  - Mujahid, 30, Thoroughbred racehorse
  - Bob Rosenfarb, 74, television producer and writer (Step by Step, Who's the Boss?, Head of the Class)
  - Andrea Weiss, 60, rabbi
- March 4
  - Catherine C. Blake, 75, jurist, chief judge (2014-2017) and judge (since 1995) of the U.S. District Court for the District of Maryland
  - Lyle Conway, actor, puppeteer and designer (death announced on this date)
  - Jacky Cupit, 88, golfer
  - Ronnie Eldridge, 95, politician, member of the New York City Council (1989-2001)
  - Lou Holtz, 89, Hall of Fame college football coach (Notre Dame Fighting Irish, Arkansas Razorbacks, NC State Wolfpack) and sportscaster
  - Philip Low, 78, chemist
  - Victoria MacKenzie-Childs, 77, ceramic artist, co-founder of MacKenzie-Childs
  - Timothy A. McDonnell, 88, Roman Catholic prelate, auxiliary bishop of New York (2001-2004) and bishop of Springfield of Massachusetts (2004-2014)
  - Richard Menschel, 92, investment banker (Goldman Sachs)
  - Russell W. Meyer Jr., 93, aviation executive, CEO of Grumman (1966-1974) and Cessna (1975-2000, 2002-2004)
  - Bernard Rands, 92, British-American composer
  - Joseph T. Threston, 90, Navy systems engineer
- March 5
  - Cecil L. Alexander, 90, politician, member of the Arkansas House of Representatives (1963-1979)
  - Maurice J. Freedman, 86, librarian, president of the American Library Association (2002-2003)
  - Bob Harlan, 89, football executive (Green Bay Packers)
  - Bernard Lafayette, 85, civil rights activist
  - Joan Leitzel, 89, mathematician
  - Corey Parker, 60, actor (Biloxi Blues, Friday the 13th: A New Beginning, Will & Grace)
  - Sandy Wernick, 86, film and television producer (ALF, Happy Gilmore, Def Comedy Jam)
  - Albert Zuckerman, 94, literary agent
- March 6
  - Colleen Hanabusa, 74, politician, member of the U.S. House of Representatives (2011-2015, 2016-2019)
  - William C. Leary, 87, politician, member of the Connecticut House of Representatives (1967-1973)
  - Lolo Matalasi Moliga, 78, American Samoan politician, governor of Samoa (2013-2021)
  - Thaddeus Mosley, 99, sculptor
  - Patrick Pasculli, 78, politician, mayor of Hoboken, New Jersey (1988-1993)
  - Jennifer Runyon, 65, actress (Another World, Ghostbusters, Charles in Charge)
  - Norma C. Russell, 88, politician, member of the South Carolina Senate (1981-1983)
  - Tierney Thys, 59, marine biologist and science educator
- March 7
  - David Brigati, 85, singer (Joey Dee and the Starliters, The Rascals)
  - James Garbarino, 78, academic and psychologist (Lost Boys: Why Our Sons Turn Violent and How We Can Save Them)
  - Rose Marie Heck, 93, politician, member of the New Jersey General Assembly (1991-2004)
  - Country Joe McDonald, 84, singer (Country Joe and the Fish) and songwriter ("I-Feel-Like-I'm-Fixin'-to-Die Rag")
  - Augie Meyers, 85, musician (Sir Douglas Quintet, Texas Tornados)
  - Cameron Ontko, 33, football player (BC Lions)
  - Judith Rapoport, 92, psychiatrist
  - Sheldon Weinig, 98, businessman, founder of Materials Research Corporation
- March 8
  - David Keene, 80, political consultant, chair of the American Conservative Union (1984-2011) and president of the National Rifle Association (2011-2013)
  - Sir Anthony Leggett, 87, British-American theoretical physicist, Nobel Prize laureate (2003)
  - William Norvel, 90, Catholic priest
  - Sam Scarber, 76, actor (The Karate Kid, Over the Top) and football player (San Diego Chargers)
  - Ray Schoenke, 84, football player (Dallas Cowboys, Washington Redskins)
- March 9
  - Richard Bozulich, 90, Go player
  - Alexander Butterfield, 99, Air Force officer and presidential assistant (Richard Nixon), administrator of the FAA (1973-1975), key figure in the Watergate scandal
  - Merrill Cook, 79, politician, member of the U.S. House of Representatives (1997-2001)
  - Tommy DeCarlo, 60, singer (Boston)
  - Gerard Gaynor, 104, electrical engineer
  - Martin Gugino, 81, peace activist (Buffalo police shoving incident)
  - Ernie Mills, 91, decoy maker
  - Willie Anthony Waters, 74, opera conductor and artistic director (Connecticut Opera)
- March 10
  - Michael Hague, 77, illustrator (The Hobbit, Alice's Adventures in Wonderland)
  - Matt Snell, 84, football player (New York Jets)
  - Melvin Steinberg, 92, politician, lieutenant governor of Maryland (1987-1995) and member of the Maryland Senate (1967-1987)
- March 11
  - Lewis Lehrman, 87, banker and politician
  - Marcelino Miyares Sotolongo, 88, Cuban-born politician and marketing executive
  - Catherine Nolan, 67, politician, member of the New York State Assembly (1985-2022)
  - Judy Pace, 83, actress (Peyton Place, The Young Lawyers, Brian's Song)
  - Jesse Roth, 91, endocrinologist
  - Serena's Song, 33, Thoroughbred racehorse
  - Martha Sundquist, 88, service executive, member of board of governors for the USO (1989-1992)
  - Gary Wagner, 85, baseball player (Philadelphia Phillies, Boston Red Sox)
- March 12
  - Daniel Amey, 84, application engineer
  - Ernie Anastos, 82, news anchor (WABC) and talk show host
  - Tony Balsamo, 89, baseball player (Chicago Cubs)
  - Tom Brown, 89, Hall of Fame football player (BC Lions)
  - Jorie Lueloff Friedman, 85, news anchor (WMAQ)
  - John H. Morrison, 92, lawyer
  - Kendall Myers, 88, convicted spy
  - David Sage, 85, actor (The Birdcage, Campus Cops, Highway to Heaven)
  - Robert Trivers, 83, evolutionary biologist
- March 13
  - Nick Baker, 88, politician, member of the Kentucky Senate (1970-1978)
  - Brian Doherty, 57, journalist (The Washington Post, The Wall Street Journal) and author (Radicals for Capitalism)
  - Paul R. Ehrlich, 93, biologist, environmentalist, and author (The Population Bomb)
  - Rosina Fernhoff, 94, actress (A Novel Romance, Studio One, Spring Street)
  - John M. Perkins, 95, Christian preacher, civil rights activist, and author
  - John A. Shaud, 92, Air Force general, chief of staff of the Supreme Headquarters Allied Powers Europe (1988-1991)
  - Doug Shively, 88, football coach (New Orleans Saints, Atlanta Falcons, Houston Oilers)
  - Phil Wise, 76, football player (New York Jets, Minnesota Vikings)
- March 14
  - Roy R. Barrera Sr., 99, politician and activist, secretary of state of Texas (1968-1969)
  - Paul Geremia, 81, blues musician
  - Christopher A. Sims, 83, economist, Nobel laureate (2011)
  - Steve Thel, 71, academic and lawyer
  - Andrew B. Wittkower, 91, British-born Canadian-American physicist
- March 15
  - Matt Clark, 89, actor (In the Heat of the Night, The Outlaw Josey Wales, The Jeff Foxworthy Show)
  - William C. Dietz, 80, science fiction writer (Halo: The Flood)
  - Raymond Finney, 84, politician, member of the Tennessee Senate (2004-2008)
  - Dick Foley, 85, folk musician (The Brothers Four)
  - Sam Kieth, 63, comic book artist and writer (The Maxx, Zero Girl)
- March 16
  - Buddy Childers, 87, politician, members of the Georgia House of Representatives (1974-2004)
  - Jack Crabtree, 90, football player (Oregon Ducks, Philadelphia Eagles, Denver Broncos)
  - Gene Derfler, 101, politician, member of the Oregon House of Representatives (1988-1994), president (2001-2003) and member (1994-2003) of the Oregon Senate
  - John Galas, 53, soccer coach (Lane United, Tucsom)
  - James N. Hardin Jr., 87, Germanist
  - E. Grady Jolly, 88, jurist, judge of the U.S. Court of Appeals for the Fifth Circuit (since 1982)
  - Eric Overmyer, 74, television writer and producer (Bosch, Law & Order, The Wire)
  - Wayne Perkins, 74, guitarist
  - Monroe Price, 87, academic
  - Orion Samuelson, 91, agriculture broadcaster (WGN)
  - Kiki Shepard, 74, television host (Showtime at the Apollo)
  - Bob Tullius, 95, racing driver (IMSA)
  - Elisabeth Waldo, 107, violinist and composer
  - Yuk L. Yung, 79, Chinese-born planetary scientist
- March 17
  - Doug Camilli, 89, baseball player (Los Angeles Dodgers, Washington Senators)
  - Rainelle Krause, 37, soprano
  - Carl Poelker, 82, athletics coach
  - Sam Semon, 60, television executive
  - Larry Stahl, 84, baseball player (Kansas City Athletics, New York Mets, San Diego Padres)
  - Sue Wagner, 86, politician, lieutenant governor of Nevada (1991-1995)
  - Robert White, 89, tenor
- March 18
  - Barry Bloom, 88, immunologist
  - Mike Clampitt, 71, politician, member of the North Carolina House of Representatives (2017-2019, since 2021)
  - Lois Delmore, 76, politician, member of the North Dakota House of Representatives (1994-2018)
  - George H. Goble, 73, scientist, Ig Nobel Prize winner (1996)
  - Della Hadley, 97, politician, member of the Missouri House of Representatives (1975-1981)
  - Rick Hogaboam, 47, politician, mayor of Nampa (since 2026)
  - Kevin Sampson, 71, artist
  - Peter Thompson, 81, stage publicist
- March 19
  - Raymond L. Ethington, 96, paleontologist
  - Richard E. Myers, 91, politician, member of the Iowa House of Representatives (1994-2003)
  - Chuck Norris, 86, martial artist and actor (Walker, Texas Ranger, Missing in Action, The Way of the Dragon)
  - Vincenzo C. Vannicola, 93, electrical engineer
  - Jeff Webb, 76, cheerleading executive, founder of Varsity Spirit and the International Cheer Union
- March 20
  - Chris Athens, mastering engineer
  - J. Michael Bishop, 90, immunologist and academic administrator, Nobel Prize laureate (1989) and chancellor of UCSF (1998-2009)
  - Nicholas Brendon, 54, actor (Buffy the Vampire Slayer, Criminal Minds, Psycho Beach Party)
  - Dennis Condrey, 76, professional wrestler (CWA, Jim Crockett Promotions, WCW)
  - Steve Gaines, 68, pastor, president of the Southern Baptist Convention (2016-2018)
  - Smith Gilley, 86, politician, member of the Texas House of Representatives (1975-1987)
  - Sam Goodwin, 82, football coach (Northwestern State Demons)
  - Harvey P. Greenspan, 93, mathematician
  - Jessie Jones, 75, actress
  - Louie Louie, 63, singer ("Sittin' in the Lap of Luxury")
  - Robert Mueller, 81, lawyer (Mueller special counsel investigation), U.S. attorney for the Northern District of California (1998-2001), deputy attorney general (2001) and director of the FBI (2001-2013)
  - Leonid Radvinsky, 43, Ukrainian-born businessman (OnlyFans, MyFreeCams)
  - David G. Schaeffer, 83, mathematician
  - Alton Sutnick, 97, medical researcher and educator
  - Calvin Tomkins, 100, author and art critic (The New Yorker)
  - Reagan Wilson, 79, actress (Blood Mania, The Beverly Hillbillies, The Big Valley) and Playboy model
  - Rick Young, 92, Hall of Fame bullfighter and rodeo clown
- March 21
  - John R. Corbid, 81, politician, member of the Minnesota House of Representatives (1975-1980)
  - Arthur E. Humphrey, 98, chemical engineer
  - Willie Irvin, 96, football player (Philadelphia Eagles)
  - Agosto Machado, artist
  - Ralph Metcalf, 90, politician, member of the North Dakota House of Representatives (1998-2012)
  - Larry Mumper, 88, politician, member of the Ohio House of Representatives (1997-2008)
  - Jessi Pierce, 37, sports reporter (Minnesota Wild)
  - Phil Reavis, 89, Olympic high jumper (1956)
- March 22
  - Ed Blaine, 86, football player (Green Bay Packers, Philadelphia Eagles)
  - Ronnie Bowman, 64, bluegrass musician (Lonesome River Band)
  - Jerry Hanlon, 96, football player and coach (Miami Redskins, Michigan Wolverines)
  - Donald Mattison, 81, epidemiologist
  - Helen Rankin, 89, politician, member of the Ohio House of Representatives (1978-1994)
  - Michael Aaron Rockland, 90, writer
  - David Simon, 63, real estate developer, CEO of Simon Property Group
  - Celeste M. Stiehl, 100, politician, member of the Illinois House of Representatives (1975-1983)
- March 23
  - Rodolfo Acuña, 93, historian and educator
  - Stan Berry, 71, politician, member of the Arkansas House of Representatives (2003-2008, since 2019)
  - Nancy W. Cook, 89, politician, member of the Delaware Senate (1974-2010)
  - Jerry Dee Lewis, rapper (The Cold Crush Brothers)
  - Valerie Perrine, 82, actress (Slaughterhouse-Five, Lenny, Superman)
  - David Sklansky, 78, poker player and author
  - Sean Stevens, 47, visual artist (2007 Boston Mooninite panic) (death announced on this date)
  - Leonard Swidler, 97, academic
  - Chip Taylor, 86, singer and songwriter ("Angel of the Morning", "Wild Thing")
  - Marica Vilcek, 89, art historian
- March 24
  - Theodore L. Brown, 97, scientist and author
  - Tracy Kidder, 80, writer (The Soul of a New Machine, Mountains Beyond Mountains), Pulitzer Prize winner (1982)
  - Bob Rossell, 89, racing driver
  - Reg Weaver, 86, labor leader
  - Western Dreamer, 32, Standardbred racehorse, Pacing Triple Crown winner (1997)
- March 25
  - Dash Crofts, 87, musician (Seals & Crofts) and songwriter ("Summer Breeze", "Diamond Girl")
  - Paula Hollinger, 85, politician, member of the Maryland Senate (1987-2007)
  - Pat Steir, 87, painter and printmaker
- March 26
  - Ken Clay, 71, baseball player (New York Yankees, Texas Rangers, Seattle Mariners)
  - David B. Cornstein, 87, diplomat, ambassador to Hungary (2018-2020)
  - Grey J. Dimenna, 72, academic administrator, president of Monmouth University (2017-2019)
  - William Murphy, 85, Roman Catholic prelate, auxiliary bishop of Boston (1995-2001) and bishop of Rockville Centre (2001-2017)
  - Barret Robbins, 52, football player (Oakland Raiders)
  - Ross the Boss, 72, guitarist (Manowar, The Dictators)
  - Ronald H. Spector, 83, military historian
  - James Tolkan, 94, actor (Back to the Future, Top Gun, Dick Tracy)
- March 27
  - Don Childers, 94, politician, member of the Florida Senate (1975-1990)
  - William S. Cleveland, 83, computer scientist (S)
  - Richard C. Edgley, 90, LDS Church general authority, first counselor in the Presiding Bishopric (1995-2012)
  - Jon Dee Graham, 67, musician (The Skunks, True Believers)
  - Kitty Harrison, 91, college tennis coach (North Carolina Tar Heels)
  - Doug Irwin, 76, luthier
  - Henry Lee, 87, Taiwanese-American forensic scientist (killing of JonBenét Ramsey, murder trial of O. J. Simpson, 9/11 forensic investigation) and biochemist
  - Tom Nieto, 65, baseball player (Minnesota Twins, Philadelphia Phillies) and coach (New York Yankees)
  - Larry Price, 91, football player (Hawaii Rainbow Warriors) and radio host (MidWeek, Perry & Price)
  - Bob Schmetterer, 82, advertising executive, chairman and CEO of Euro RSCG (1997-2004) (death announced on this date)
- March 28
  - Joey Browner, 65, football player (Minnesota Vikings, Tampa Bay Buccaneers)
  - DJ Dan, 57, house music DJ and producer
  - Alex Duong, 42, comedian and actor (Blue Bloods, Dexter, Death Valley)
  - Mary Beth Hurt, 79, actress (The World According to Garp, The Age of Innocence, Interiors)
  - Matt Krupanski, drummer (BoySetsFire)
  - Hank Nichols, 89, Hall of Fame college basketball referee
  - Jeff Siemon, 75, football player (Minnesota Vikings)
- March 29
  - Alberto Coutinho, 56, politician, member of the New Jersey General Assembly (1997-1998, 2008-2013)
  - Jeffrey Paul Cutlip, 76, serial killer and rapist
  - Greg Elmore, 79, drummer (Quicksilver Messenger Service, The Brogues)
  - Dorothi Fox, 96, actress (Orange Is the New Black, Bananas, The Wiz).
  - Jay Robinson, 79, Hall of Fame wrestler (1972 Summer Olympics) and coach (Minnesota Golden Gophers)
  - Tim Sandlin, 75, novelist and screenwriter (Skipped Parts, The Right Kind of Wrong)
  - Williametta Spencer, 98, composer and musicologist
- March 30
  - Carl Bonafede, 85, music manager (The Buckinghams, Daughters of Eve) and musician
  - Jean M. Doerge, 88, politician, member of the Louisiana House of Representatives (1998-2012)
  - Melvin Edwards, 88, sculptor
  - Walt Maddox, 88, singer (The Marcels)
  - Christopher North, 75, keyboardist (Ambrosia)
  - Dennis J. O'Callaghan, 85, virologist
  - Charles E. Scott, 90, philosopher
- March 31
  - Bob Atha, 65, football player (Ohio State Buckeyes)

== April ==
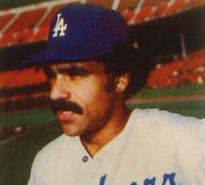
Davey Lopes

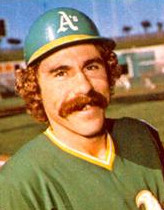
Phil Garner

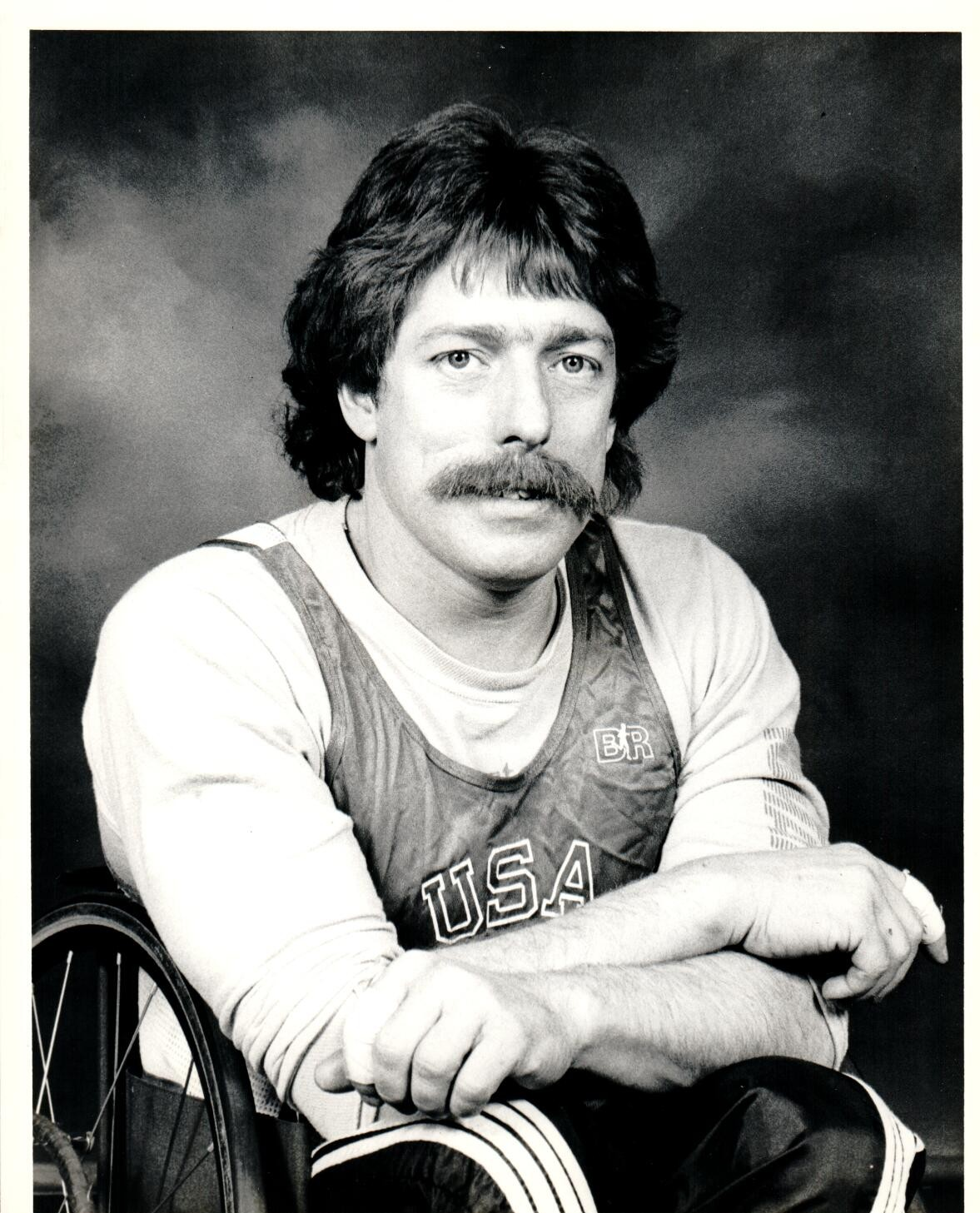
Bob Hall

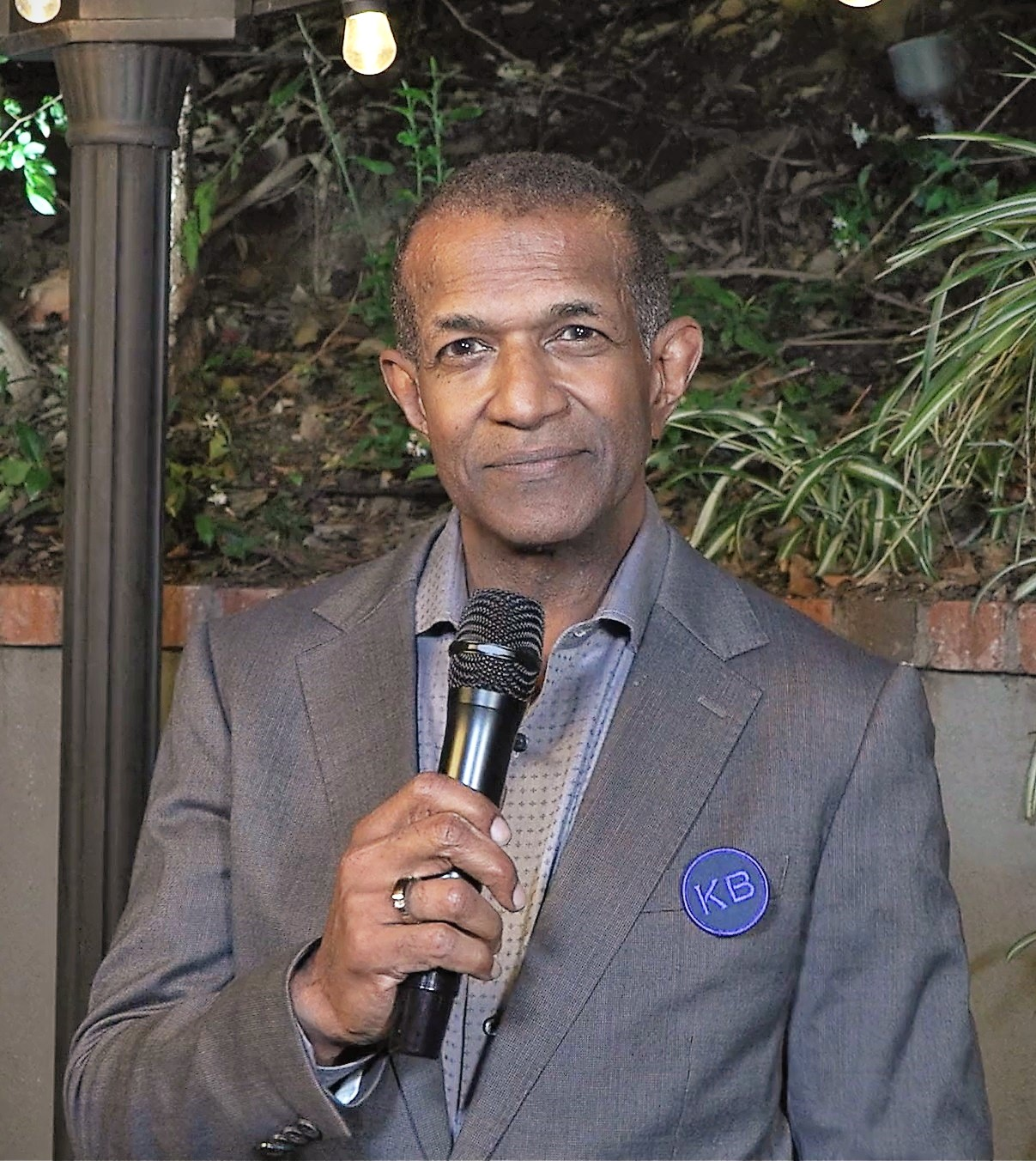
Rif Hutton

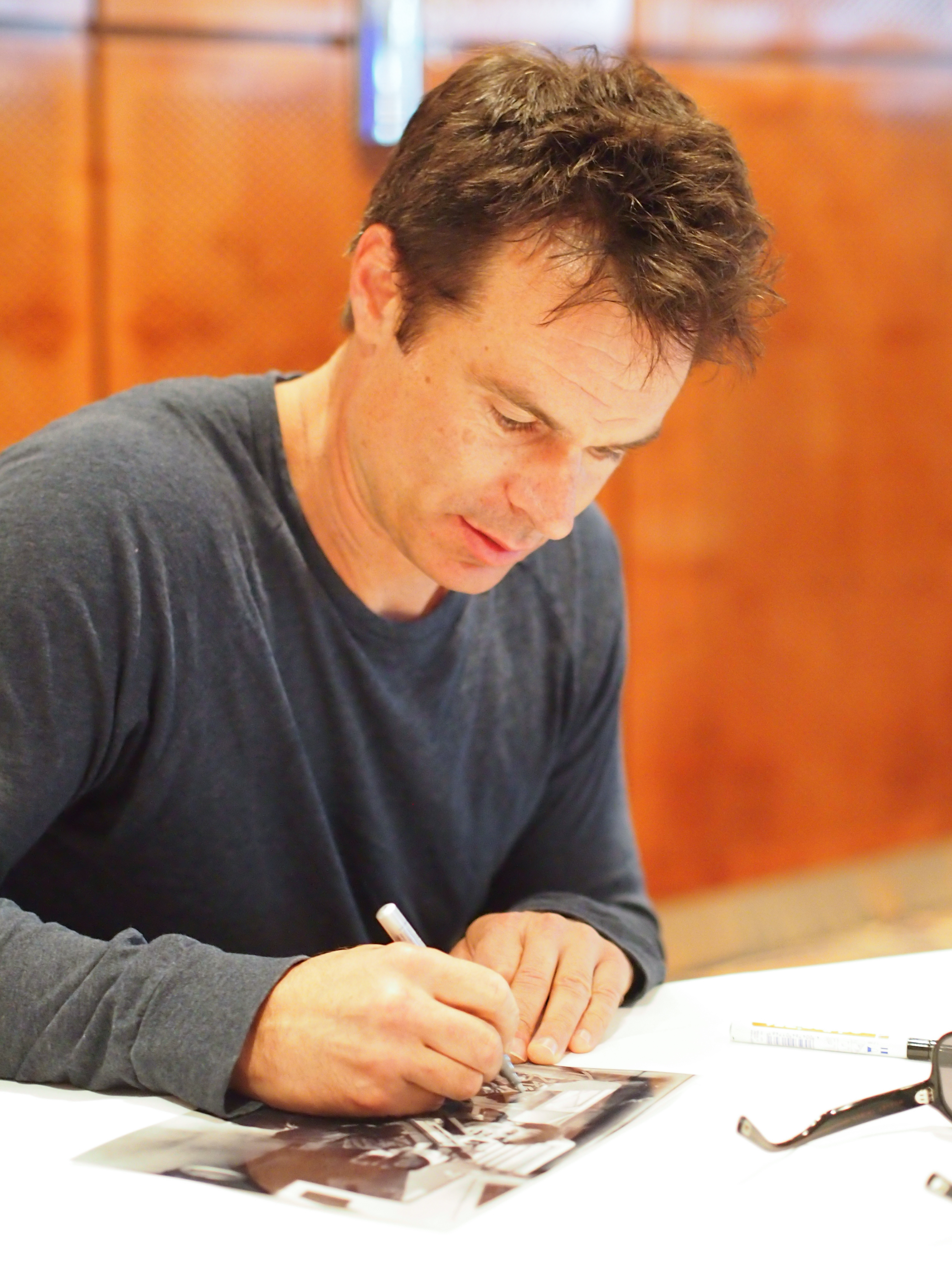
Patrick Muldoon

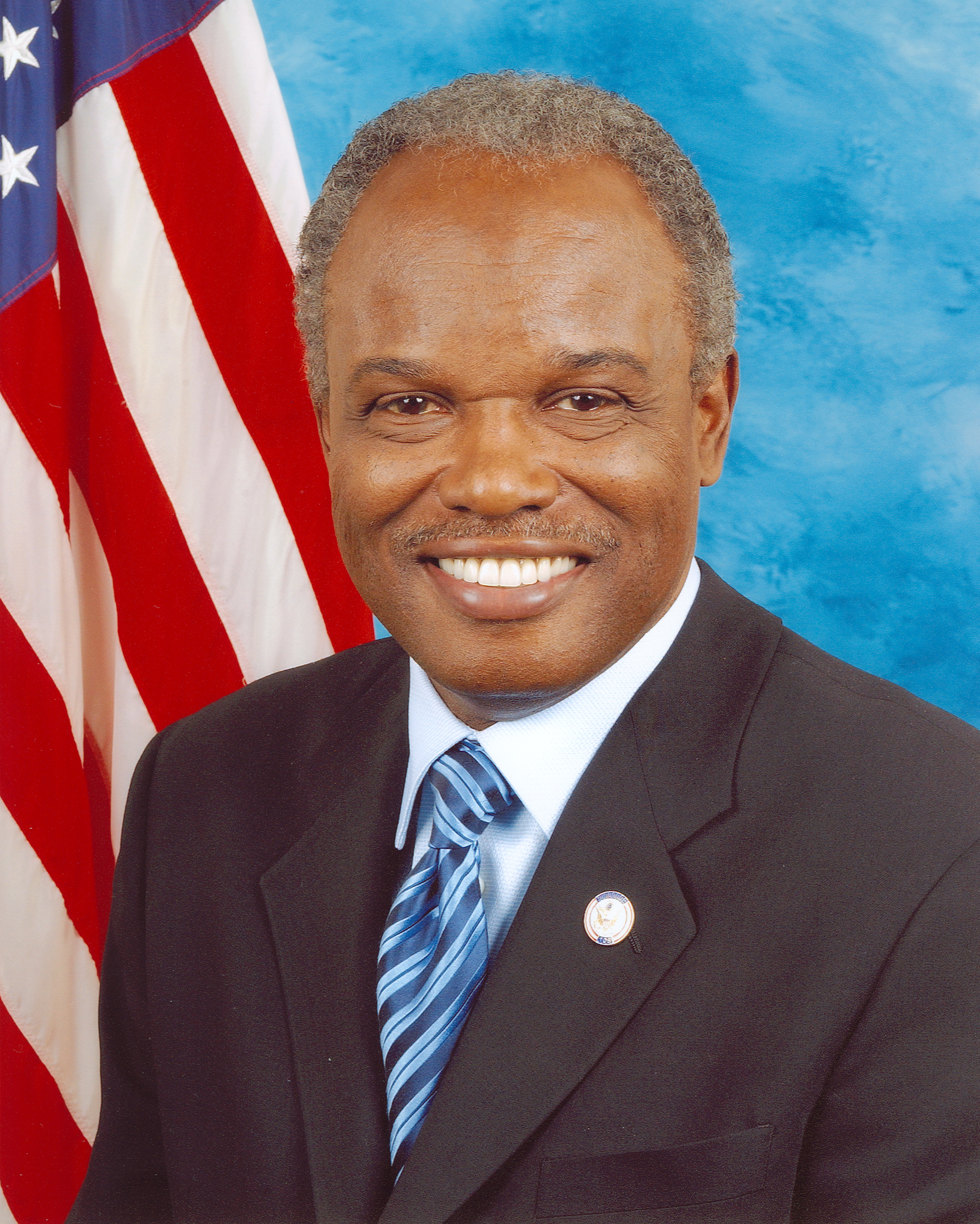
David Scott

- April 1
  - Nancy Metayer Bowen, 38, politician, vice mayor of Coral Springs, Florida
  - Donald V. DeRosa, 85, academic administrator, president of the University of the Pacific (1995–2009)
  - Dick Farley, 79, football player (San Diego Chargers) and coach (Williams Ephs)
  - Rosemary Kurtz, 95, politician, member of the Illinois House of Representatives (2001–2005)
  - Tom Valenti, 67, chef
- April 2
  - Dee Freeman, 66, actress (The Young and the Restless)
  - James Gadson, 86, drummer (Charles Wright & the Watts 103rd Street Rhythm Band) and session musician
  - Bo Lueders, 39, guitarist (Harm's Way) (death announced on this date)
  - Peter Neumeyer, 96, German-born academic
  - George Plafker, 97, seismologist
  - Jerrold Zar, 84, biologist
- April 3
  - Bettina Cirone, 92, photographer
  - Fred Curry, 82, professional wrestler (NWA, NWF)
  - Rod Diridon Sr., 87, politician, chairman of the CHSRA (2001–2003)
  - Pearl Fryar, 86, topiary artist
  - Carol Greitzer, 101, politician and abortion activist, New York City councilwoman (1969–1991)
  - Karen Muenster, 83, politician, member of the South Dakota Senate (1985–1992)
  - Terry Schreiber, 89, theater director
  - Fred Simon, 74, singer (The Lost Generation, The Chi-Lites) (death announced on this date)
  - Gerard Williams, 73, football player (Washington Redskins, San Francisco 49ers) (death announced on this date)
  - Butch Wilson, 84, football player (Baltimore Colts, New York Giants)
- April 4
  - Bob Duliba, 91, baseball player (St. Louis Cardinals, Los Angeles Angels, Boston Red Sox)
  - Garner Ekstran, 86, football player (Saskatchewan Roughriders, BC Lions)
  - Harry Keyishian, 93, literary editor (FDU Press) and academic
  - Raynella Leath, 77, exonerated murder suspect
  - Iris Long, 91, chemist and activist
  - Gerald Paddio, 60, basketball player (Cleveland Cavaliers, Indiana Pacers, New York Knicks)
  - Marian Van Landingham, 88, politician, member of the Virginia House of Delegates (1983–2006)
  - Evelyn Wilson, 66, jurist, justice of the Kansas Supreme Court (2020–2025)
- April 5
  - Tony Davis, 73, football player (Cincinnati Bengals, Tampa Bay Buccaneers, Boston Breakers)
  - Donn Landee, 79, record producer (5150) and recording engineer (Minute by Minute, 1984) (death announced on this date)
  - Donlyn Lyndon, 90, American architect.
- April 6
  - Blondy, 66, rapper (The Sequence) and songwriter ("Funk You Up")
  - Gene Hooks, 98, university athletics director (Wake Forest)
- April 7
  - Barbara Gordon, 90, filmmaker and producer
  - Albert N. Martin, 91, Reformed Baptist minister
  - Chuck Nieson, 83, baseball player (Minnesota Twins)
  - Rodney Pyles, 80, politician, member of the West Virginia House of Delegates (2016–2020)
  - Jim Whittaker, 97, mountaineer (1963 Mount Everest expedition)
- April 8
  - Terry Gabinski, 87, politician, member of the Chicago City Council (1969–1998)
  - Davey Lopes, 80, baseball player (Los Angeles Dodgers, Chicago Cubs) and manager (Milwaukee Brewers), World Series champion (1981, 2008)
  - Lakshmanan Sathyavagiswaran, 77, Indian-born medical examiner, Los Angeles County chief medical examiner-coroner (1992–2013, 2016–2017)
  - Nancy Sheppard, 96, trick rider
  - Mark Weissman, 77, politician, member of the Florida House of Representatives (2000–2002) (death announced on this date)
- April 9
  - Afrika Bambaataa, 68, DJ and rapper ("Planet Rock", "Looking for the Perfect Beat", "Renegades of Funk")
  - Billy Bryan, 87, baseball player (Kansas City Athletics, New York Yankees, Washington Senators)
  - John Edelman, 90, American baseball player (Milwaukee Braves).
  - Ray Monette, 79, musician (Rare Earth)
  - Jackie Moore, 93, basketball player (Syracuse Nationals, Milwaukee Hawks, Philadelphia Warriors)
  - Stephen M. Schwebel, 97, jurist, judge (1981–2000), vice president (1994–1997) and president (1997–2000) of the ICJ
- April 10
  - Aldwyth, 90, American artist.
  - Celeste Dupuy-Spencer, 46, painter
  - Eliot Engel, 79, politician, member of the U.S. House of Representatives (1989–2021)
  - Barney Fisher, 78, politician, member of the Missouri House of Representatives (2005–2013)
  - William Edwin Franklin, 95, Roman Catholic prelate, bishop of Davenport (1993–2006) and auxiliary bishop of Dubuque (1987–1993)
  - Harry Kim, 74, trumpeter (The Phenix Horns)
  - Anita Martinez, 100, politician, Dallas City councillor (1969–1973)
  - William Leon McBride, 88, philosopher
  - Browning Nagle, 57, football player (New York Jets)
  - Bob Novogratz, 89, Hall of Fame football player (Army Cadets)
- April 11
  - Michael Baroody, 79, lobbyist
  - Phil Garner, 76, baseball player (Houston Astros, Pittsburgh Pirates) and manager (Milwaukee Brewers)
  - Clifford Otte, 93, politician, member of the Wisconsin State Assembly (1993–1999)
  - Chris Payton-Jones, 30, football player (Arizona Cardinals, Minnesota Vikings, Tennessee Titans)
  - Lionel Rosenblatt, 82, diplomat, president of Refugees International (1990–2001)
  - Flo Oy Wong, 87, artist, curator and educator
- April 12
  - Bob Hall, 74, wheelchair racer
  - Valerie Lee Shepard, 94, actress (The Wizard of Oz, Our Gang)
  - Bill Patmon, 80, politician, member of the Cleveland City Council (1990–2001) and Ohio House of Representatives (2011–2018)
  - Frank Stack, 88, cartoonist (Our Cancer Year)
- April 13
  - Dave McGinnis, 74, football player (TCU Horned Frogs) and coach (Arizona Cardinals)
  - Arthur Louis Schechter, 86, politician, diplomat and attorney
  - Lee Wachtstetter, 97, author
  - Jean Walkinshaw, 99, television producer
- April 14
  - Steve Clark, 82, swimmer, three-time Olympic champion (1964)
  - Robert Cluck, 87, politician, mayor of Arlington, Texas (2003–2015)
  - John Fitzgerald, 77, football player (Dallas Cowboys)
  - Marc Galanter, 95, academic
  - Joy Harmon, 87, actress (Cool Hand Luke, Village of the Giants, Angel in My Pocket)
  - James F. Howell, 91, politician, member of the Oklahoma Senate (1970–1986)
  - Jim Kanicki, 84, football player (Cleveland Browns, New York Giants)
  - Franklin F. Kuo, 91, Chinese-born computer scientist and academic, co-developer of ALOHAnet
  - Dan Wall, 72, jazz keyboardist
- April 15
  - Barbara Carr, 85, blues singer
  - Kevin Klose, 85, broadcast executive, president of NPR (1998–2008)
  - Mark Mobius, 89, American-born German fund manager
  - Lou Zocchi, 91, gaming distributor and publisher
- April 16
  - Garret Anderson, 53, baseball player (Los Angeles Angels), World Series champion (2002)
  - Barbara Flynn Currie, 85, politician, member of the Illinois House of Representatives (1979–2019)
  - Cerina Fairfax, 49, dentist
  - Justin Fairfax, 47, politician, lieutenant governor of Virginia (2018–2022)
  - James Hayward, 82, abstract painter
  - Jim Jabir, 63, women's basketball coach (Dayton Flyers, Siena Saints, Marquette Golden Eagles)
  - Craig Krampf, 80, session drummer, songwriter ("Oh Sherrie") and producer
  - Don Schlitz, 73, Hall of Fame songwriter ("The Gambler", "Forever and Ever, Amen", "When You Say Nothing at All")
  - Dory Selinger, 54, cyclist, Paralympic champion (1996)
- April 17
  - Terry L. Bruce, 82, politician, member of the U.S. House of Representatives (1985–1993)
  - Dean Buntrock, 94, waste service executive, co-founder of Waste Management, Inc.
  - Ernie Dosio, 75, vintner and trophy hunter
  - Bob Kevoian, 75, radio presenter (The Bob & Tom Show)
  - David McKinley, 79, politician, member of the U.S. House of Representatives (2011–2023)
- April 18
  - John F. Boyle, Jr., 82, convicted murderer
  - Stanton Davis, 80, jazz trumpeter
  - Rif Hutton, 73, actor (Doogie Howser, M.D., JAG, General Hospital)
  - Doug Martin, 68, football player (Minnesota Vikings)
  - Dean Schwarz, 88, ceramic artist
  - John Seymour, 88, politician, member of the U.S. Senate (1991–1992)
  - Van Hammer, 66, professional wrestler (WCW)
- April 19
  - George Ariyoshi, 100, politician, lieutenant governor (1970–1974) and governor of Hawaii (1974–1986)
  - Dean Cooley, 92, politician, member of the Arizona House of Representatives (1997–2003)
  - Patrick Muldoon, 57, (Days of Our Lives, Melrose Place, Starship Troopers) and film producer
- April 20
  - Ralph B. Guy Jr., 96, jurist, judge of the U.S. District Court for the Eastern District of Michigan (1976–1985) and the U.S. Court of Appeals for the Sixth Circuit (since 1985)
  - Lawrence Korb, 86, attorney, assistant secretary of defense (1981–1985)
  - Rod Martin, 72, football player (Oakland / Los Angeles Raiders)
  - Wayne Moss, 88, session guitarist (Area Code 615, Barefoot Jerry) and songwriter
  - Alan Osmond, 76, musician (The Osmonds) and songwriter ("Down by the Lazy River", "Crazy Horses")
  - David Wilcock, 53, paranormal writer
- April 21
  - Gregg Foreman, 53, musician (The Delta 72)
  - Andrew Hacker, 96, political scientist
  - Henry J. Mansell, 88, Roman Catholic prelate, auxiliary bishop of New York (1992–1995), bishop of Buffalo (1995–2003) and archbishop of Hartford (2003–2013)
- April 22
  - Eugene Braunwald, 96, Austrian-born cardiologist
  - Brian Edgerly, 82, Olympic baseball player (1964)
  - Mike Ohnstad, 99, politician, member of the Minnesota House of Representatives (1973–1974)
  - Kenneth Roman, 95, advertising executive, chairman of Ogilvy (1985–1989)
  - David Scott, 80, politician, member of the U.S. House of Representatives (since 2003), Georgia Senate (1983–2003), and House of Representatives (1975–1983)
  - Darrell Sheets, 67, reality television personality (Storage Wars)
  - Ruth Slenczynska, 101, classical pianist
  - Dean Tavoularis, 93, production designer (The Godfather, Apocalypse Now, Bonnie and Clyde), Oscar winner (1975)
  - Michael Tilson Thomas, 81, conductor, pianist and composer
  - Corky Withrow, 88, baseball player (St. Louis Cardinals)
- April 23
  - Jack Bass, 91, author and journalist (The Charlotte Observer)
  - Nancy Cox, 77, virologist
  - Josh Mauro, 35, English-born football player (Arizona Cardinals, New York Giants, Jacksonville Jaguars)
  - Richard P. Simmons, 94, metallurgist, industrialist and philanthropist
  - Jack R. Thornell, 86, photographer
- April 24
  - G. A. Hardaway, 71, politician, member of the Tennessee House of Representatives (since 2007)
  - George Herms, 90, artist
  - Dirk Kempthorne, 74, politician, member of the U.S. Senate (1993–1999), governor of Idaho (1999–2006) and secretary of the interior (2006–2009)
  - Tommy Nuñez, 87, basketball referee
  - Donald Riegle, 88, politician, member of the U.S. House of Representatives (1967–1976) and U.S. Senate (1976–1995)
  - Bill Swain, 85, football player (New York Giants, Detroit Lions, Minnesota Vikings)
- April 25
  - James E. Carnes, 84, politician, member of the Ohio Senate (1995–2004)
  - Liz Conmy, 67, politician, member of the North Dakota House of Representatives (since 2022)
  - Matt DeCaro, 70, actor (Prison Break, Richie Rich, U.S. Marshals)
  - Marilyn Hickey, 94, minister and televangelist
  - Dick Kimball, 91, Hall of Fame diver and diving coach
  - Jaan Puhvel, 94, Estonian-born linguist
  - Mircea Răceanu, 90, Romanian-born diplomat and political dissident
  - Peter H. Raven, 89, botanist and environmentalist
  - Jarvis Rockwell, 94, artist
- April 26
  - Monte Coleman, 68, football player (Washington Redskins) and coach (Arkansas–Pine Bluff Golden Lions)
  - Gerry Conway, 73, comic book writer (The Amazing Spider-Man, Punisher, Justice League)
  - Jesse Crenshaw, 79, politician, member of the Kentucky House of Representatives (1993–2015)
  - Erroll Davis, 81, politician, member of the Pennsylvania House of Representatives (1971–1972)
  - Ruby Duncan, 93, welfare rights activist
  - Sam Hunt, 83, politician and educator, member of the Washington Senate (2017–2025) and House of Representatives (2001–2017)
  - David Klahr, 86, psychologist
  - Alfred Slote, 99, author
  - Nedra Talley, 80, Hall of Fame singer (The Ronettes)
- April 27
  - Edith Eger, 98, Hungarian-born psychologist and author
  - John E. Franz, 96, chemist
  - Zelda F. Gamson, 90, sociologist
  - Steve Maslow, 81, sound mixer (The Empire Strikes Back, Raiders of the Lost Ark, Speed), Oscar winner (1981, 1982, 1995)
  - Doc Sauers, 96, basketball coach (Albany Great Danes)
  - Len Strazewski, 71, comic book writer (Starman, The Flash, Justice Society of America)
- April 28
  - Conrad Cardinal, 84, baseball player (Houston Colt .45's)
  - Cleetis Mack, rapper (Digital Underground) (death announced on this date)
  - Denys Overholser, 86, electrical engineer and stealth technology specialist
  - Adrian Smith, 89, basketball player (Cincinnati Royals, San Francisco Warriors), Olympic champion (1960)
  - Roger Sweet, 91, toy designer (Mattel), creator of He-Man
- April 29
  - Stephen Adamini, 81, politician, member of the Michigan House of Representatives (2001–2006)
  - Merle Bettenhausen, 82, racing driver
  - David Allan Coe, 86, country singer ("Mona Lisa Lost Her Smile", "The Ride") and songwriter ("Take This Job and Shove It")
  - J. Craig Venter, 79, genomics researcher, founder of Celera Corporation and JCVI
- April 30
  - Art Becker, 84, basketball player (Houston Mavericks, Indiana Pacers, Denver Rockets)
  - Seymour Bernstein, 99, pianist and composer
  - Gwen Farrell, 93, actress (M*A*S*H) and boxing referee
  - James Ernest Hitchcock, 70, convicted murderer
  - James Langdon Jr., 88, politician, member of the North Carolina House of Representatives (2005–2017)
  - Bobby Murray, 72, blues musician, songwriter and producer
  - Karl Zinsmeister, 67, writer and consultant, director of the White House Domestic Policy Council (2006–2009)

== May ==
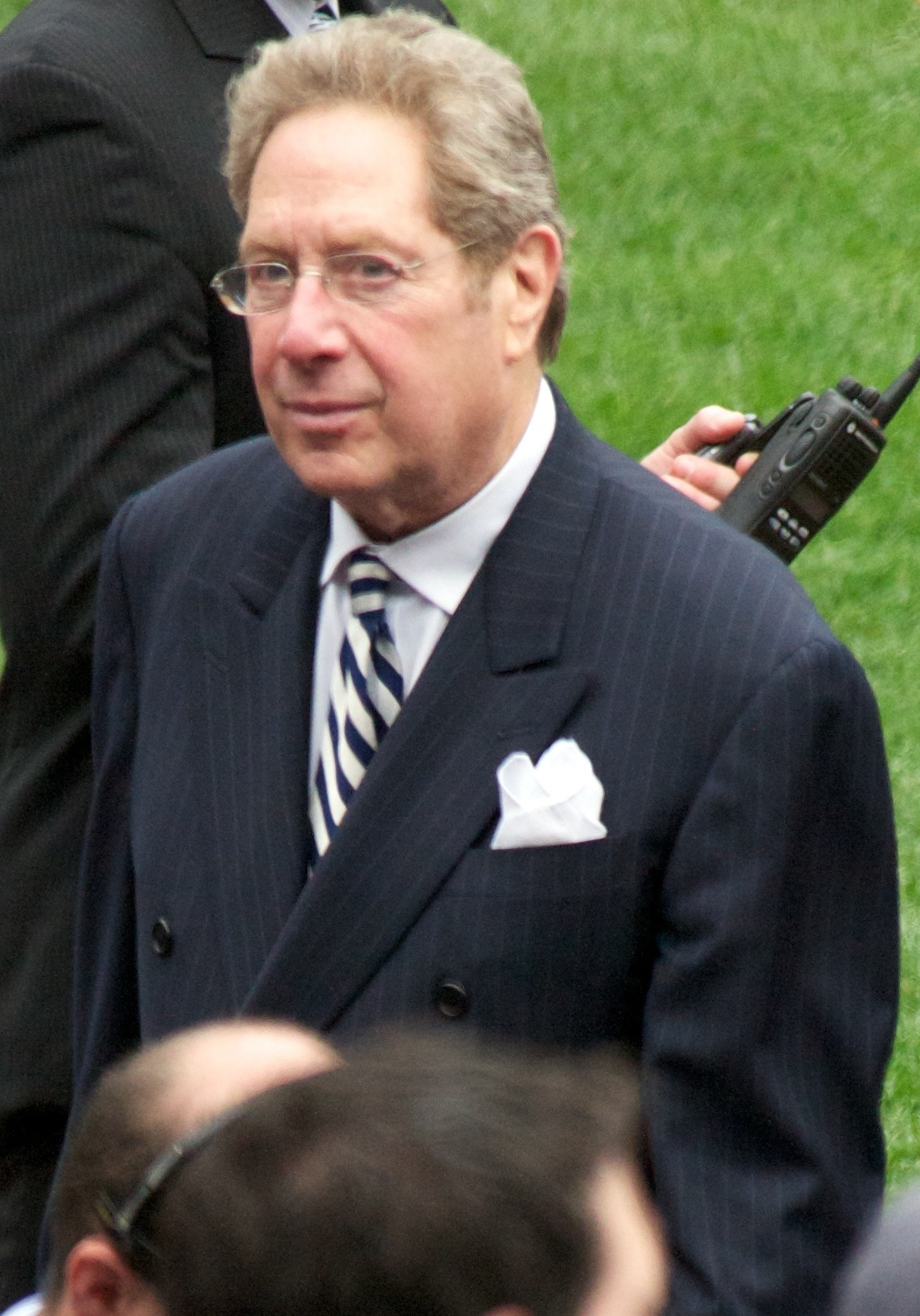
John Sterling

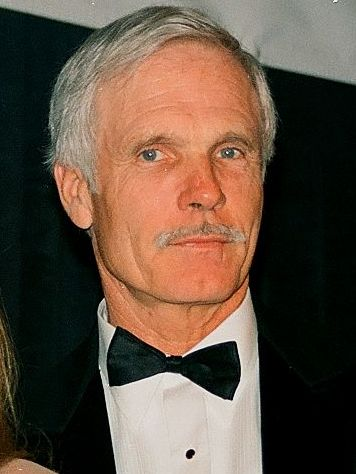
Ted Turner

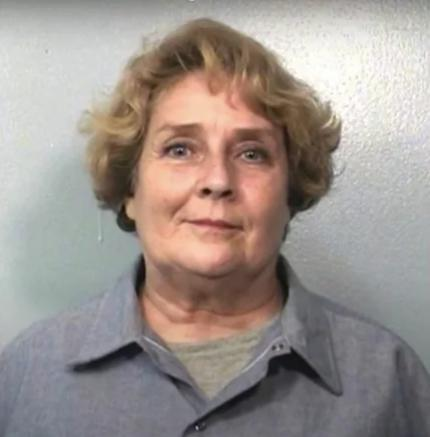
Betty Broderick

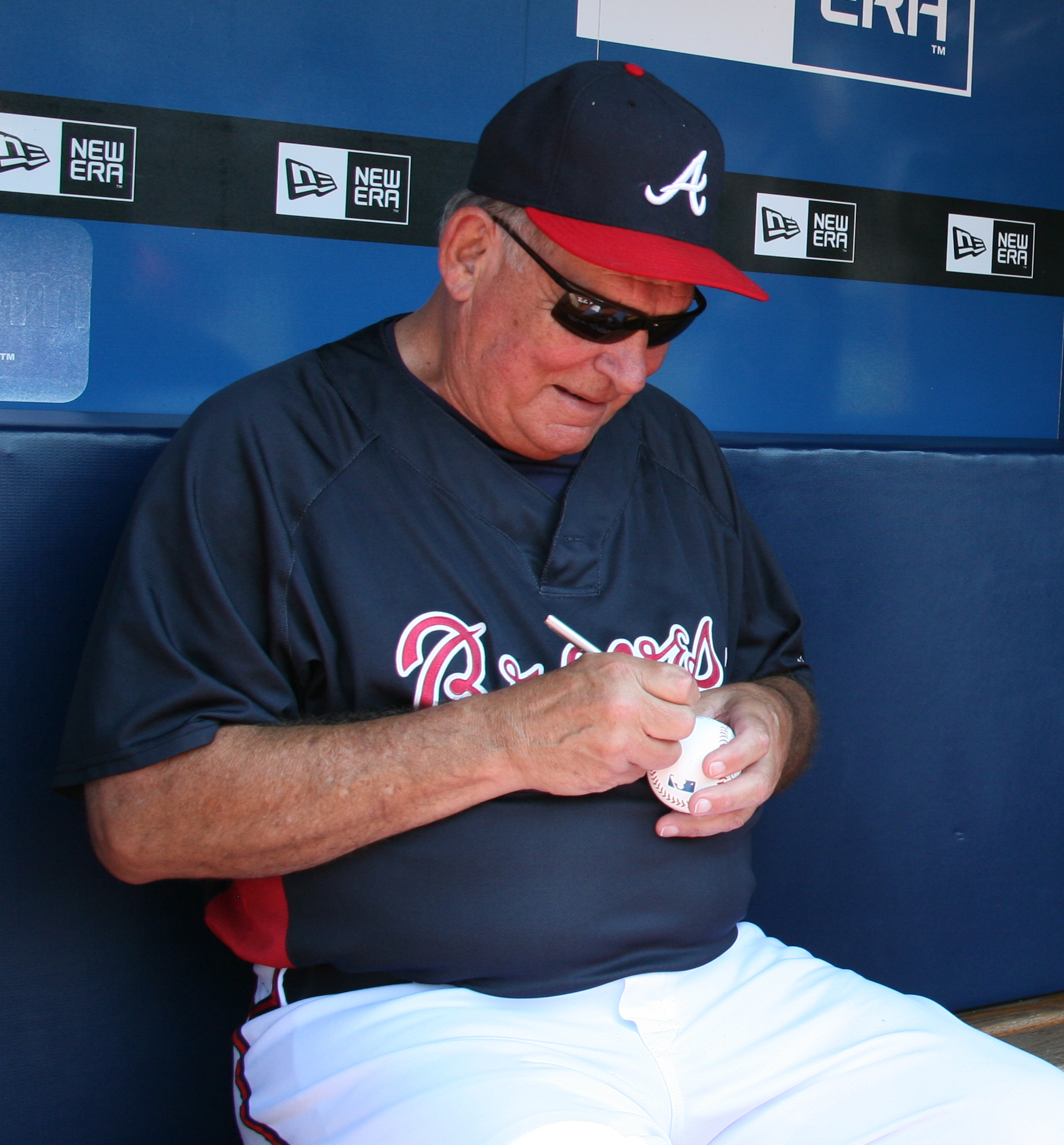
Bobby Cox

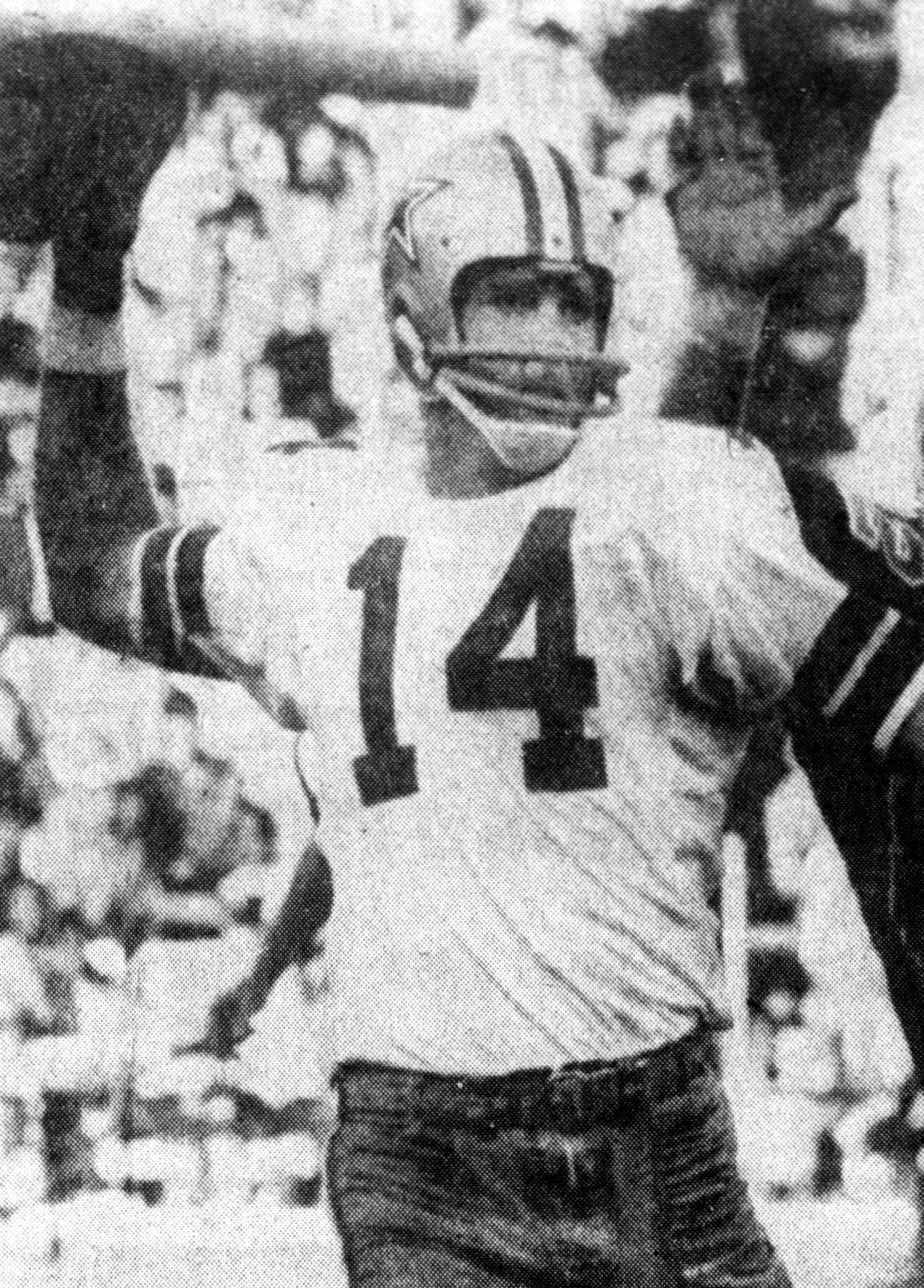
Craig Morton

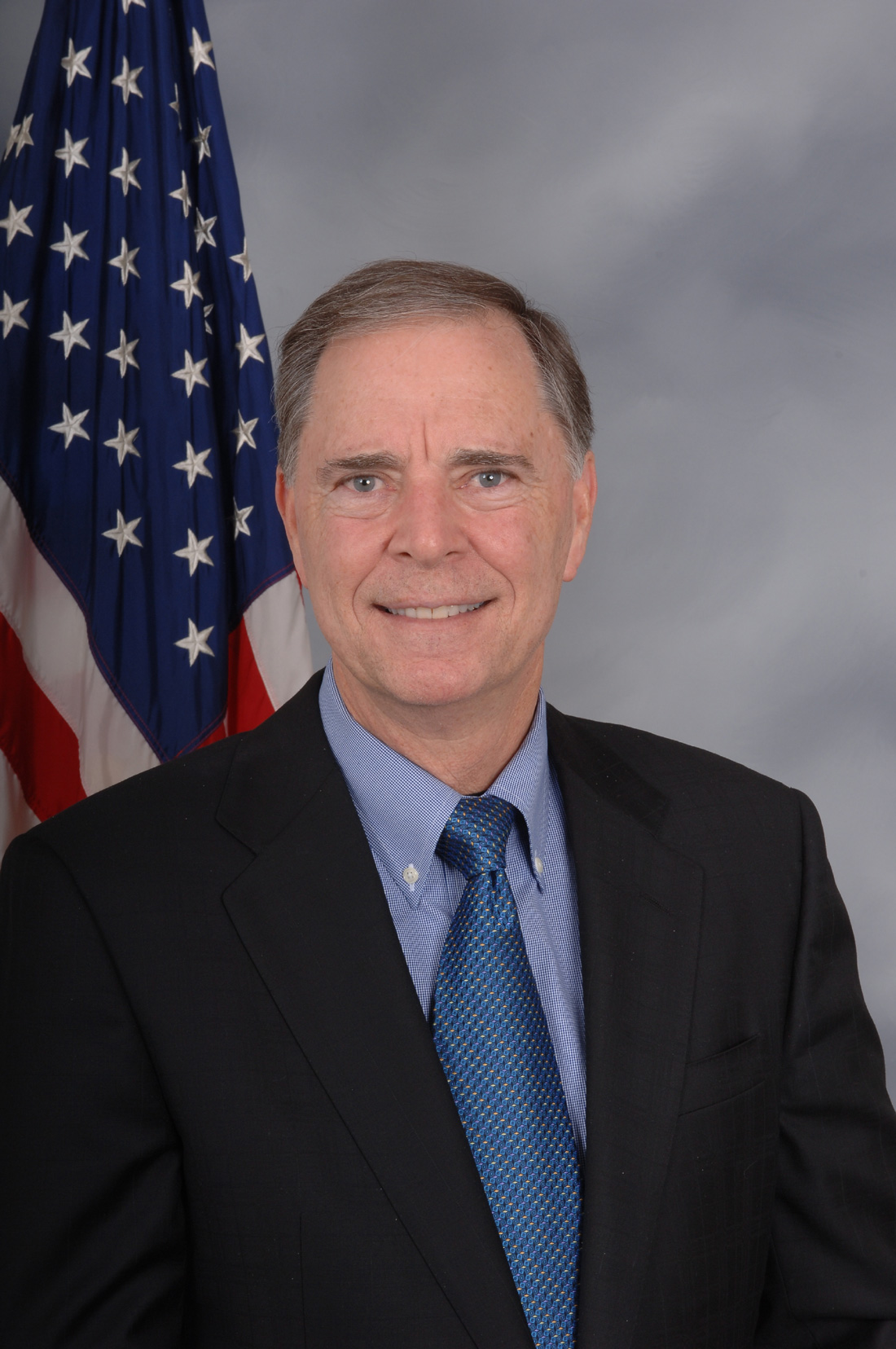
Bill Posey

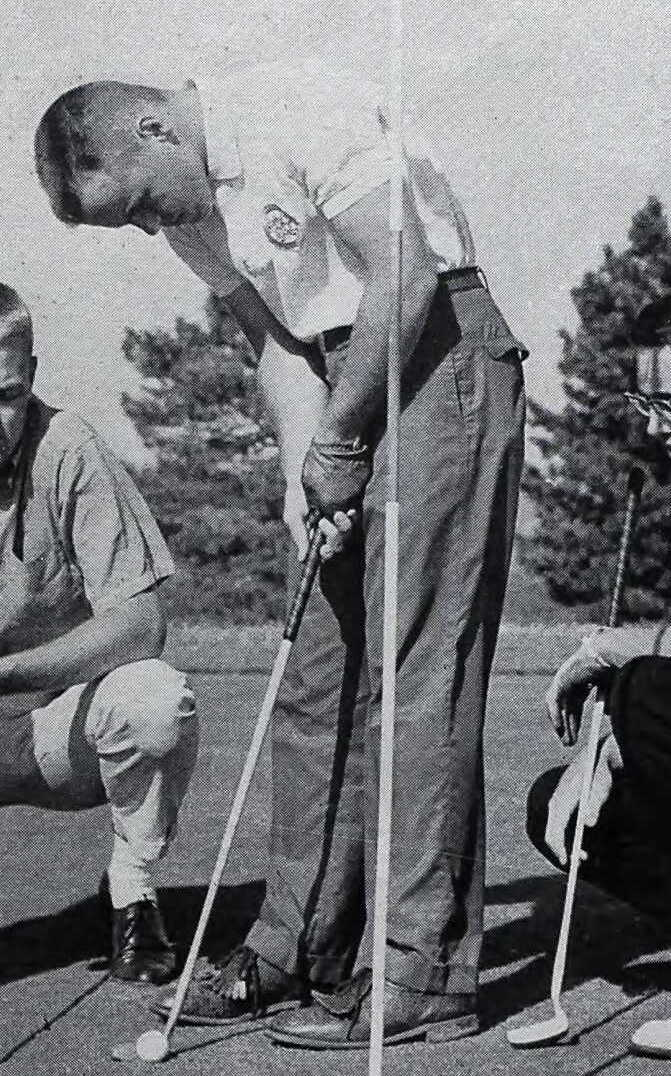
Jim Colbert

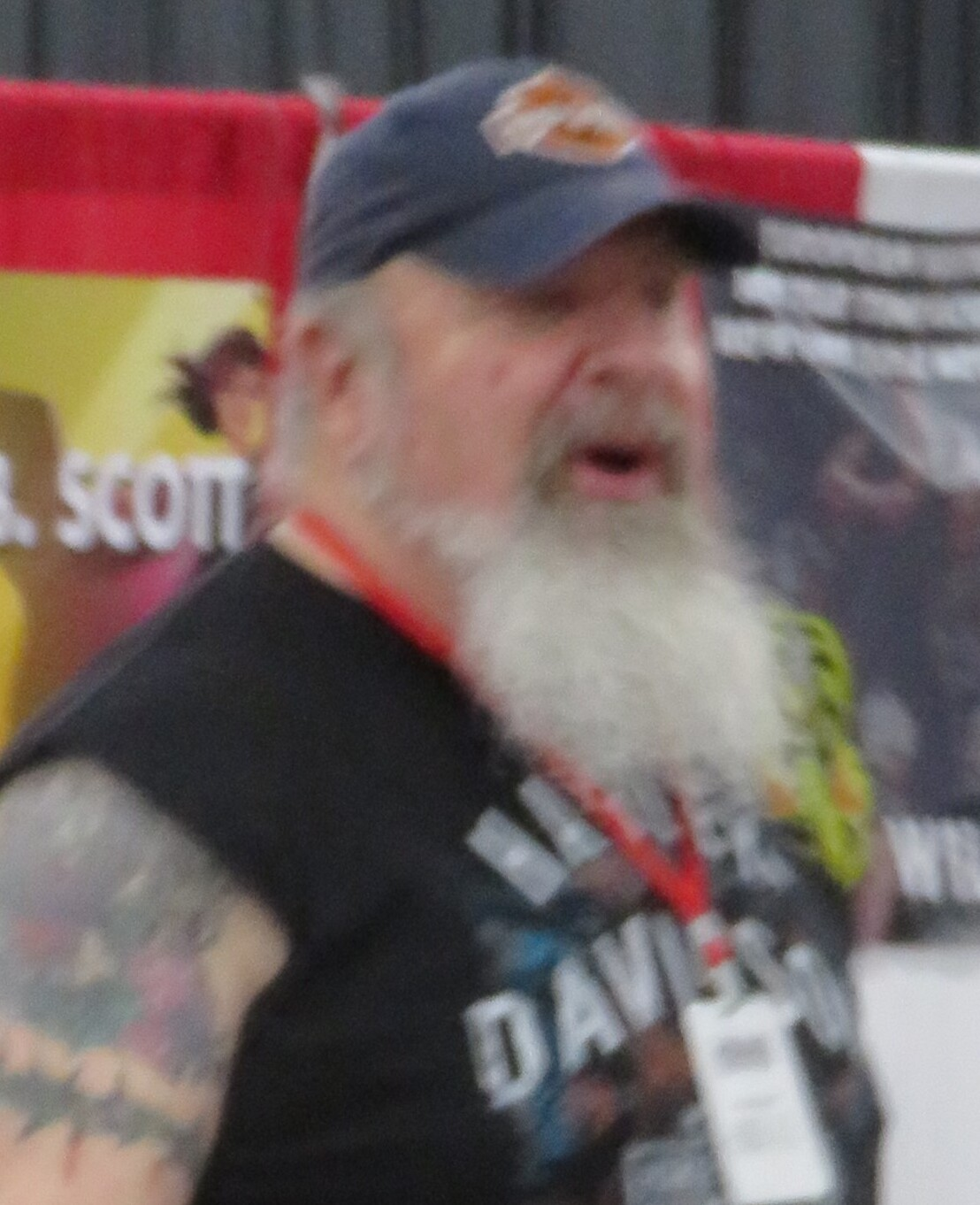
Donald Gibb

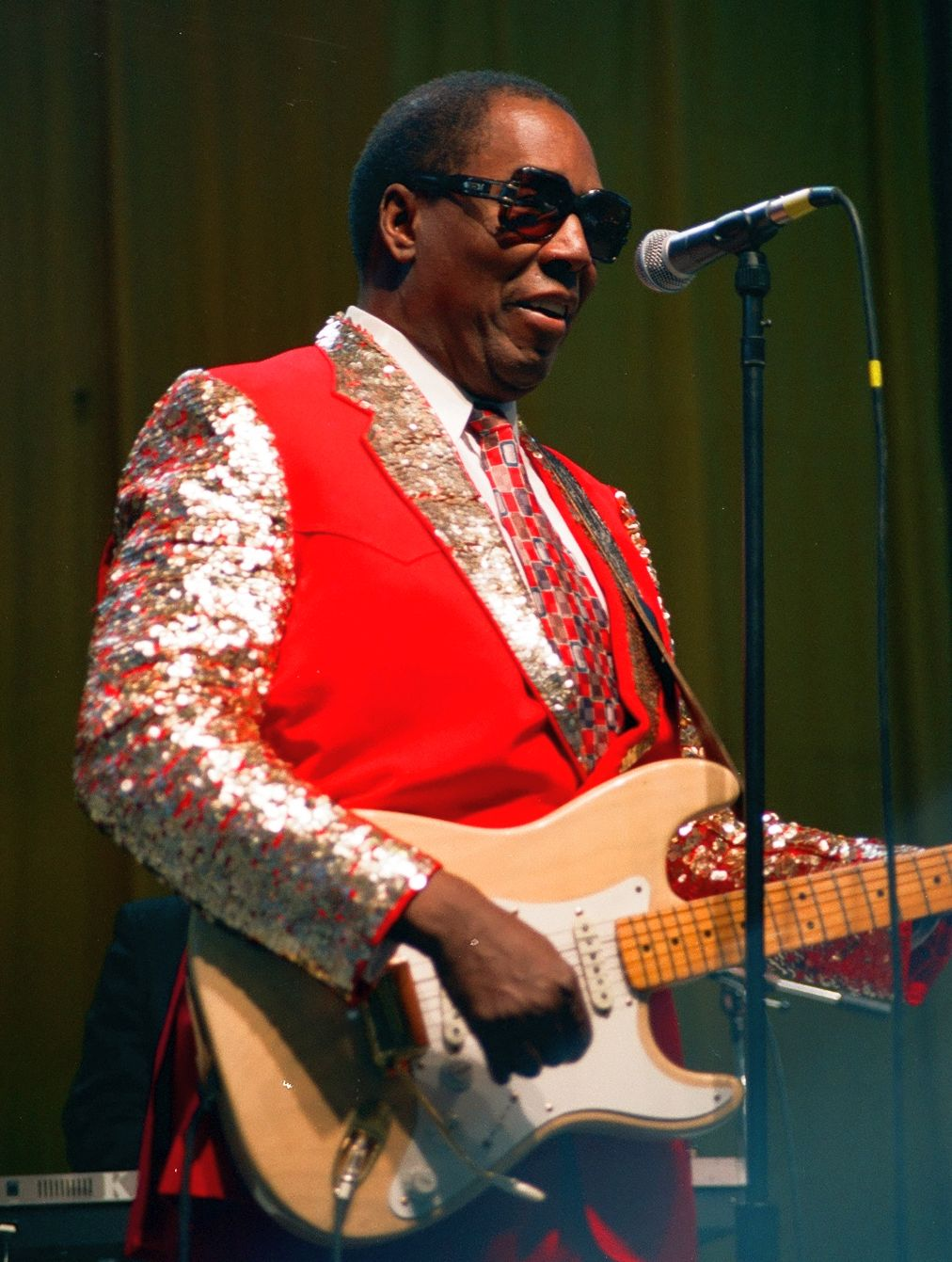
Clarence Carter

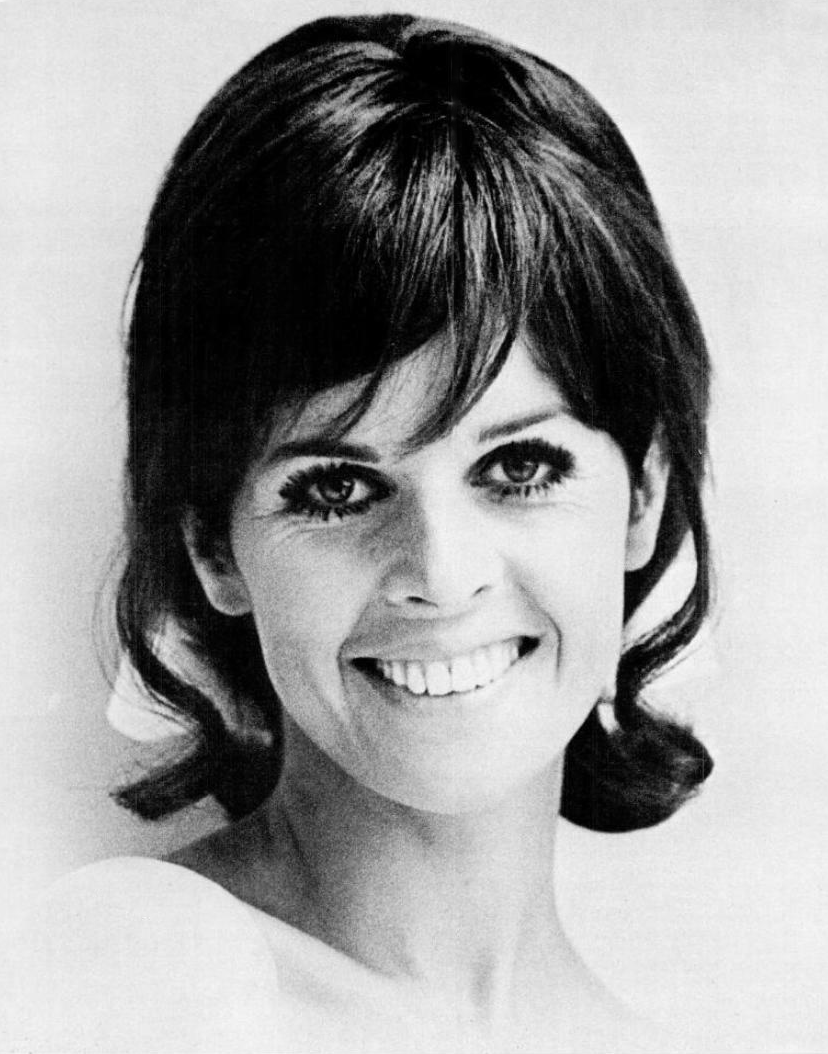
Claudine Longet

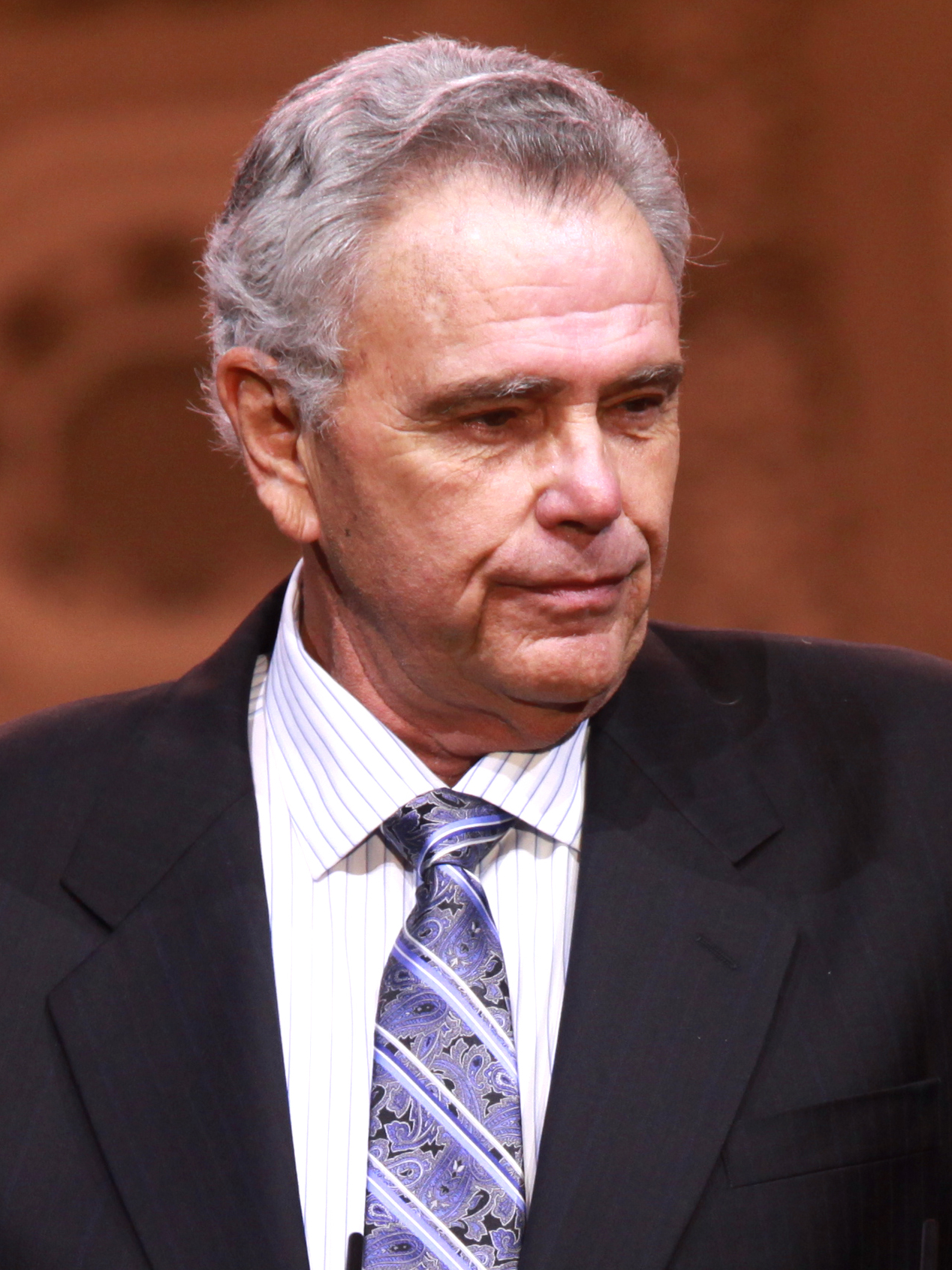
James Robison

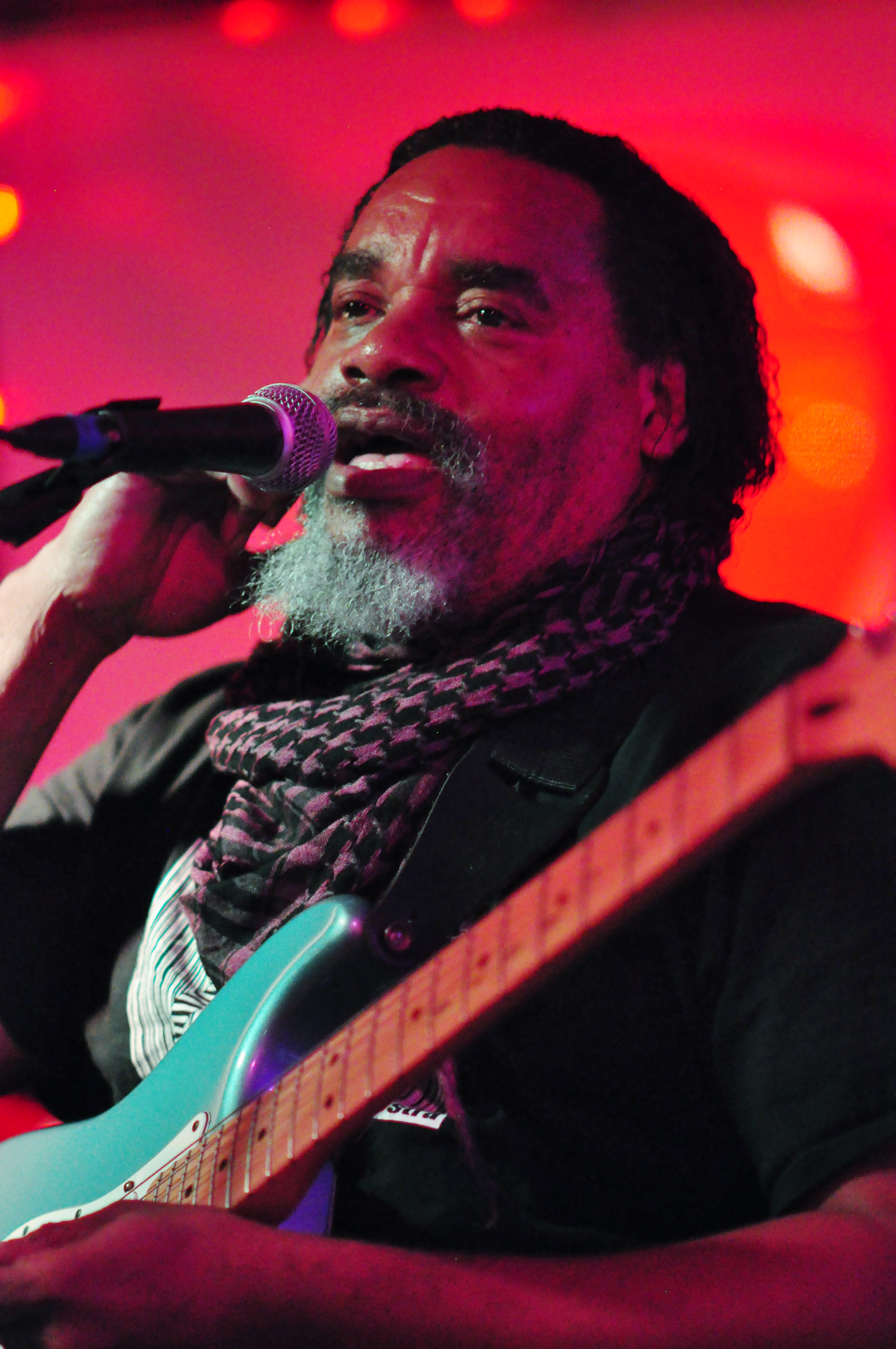
Ike Willis

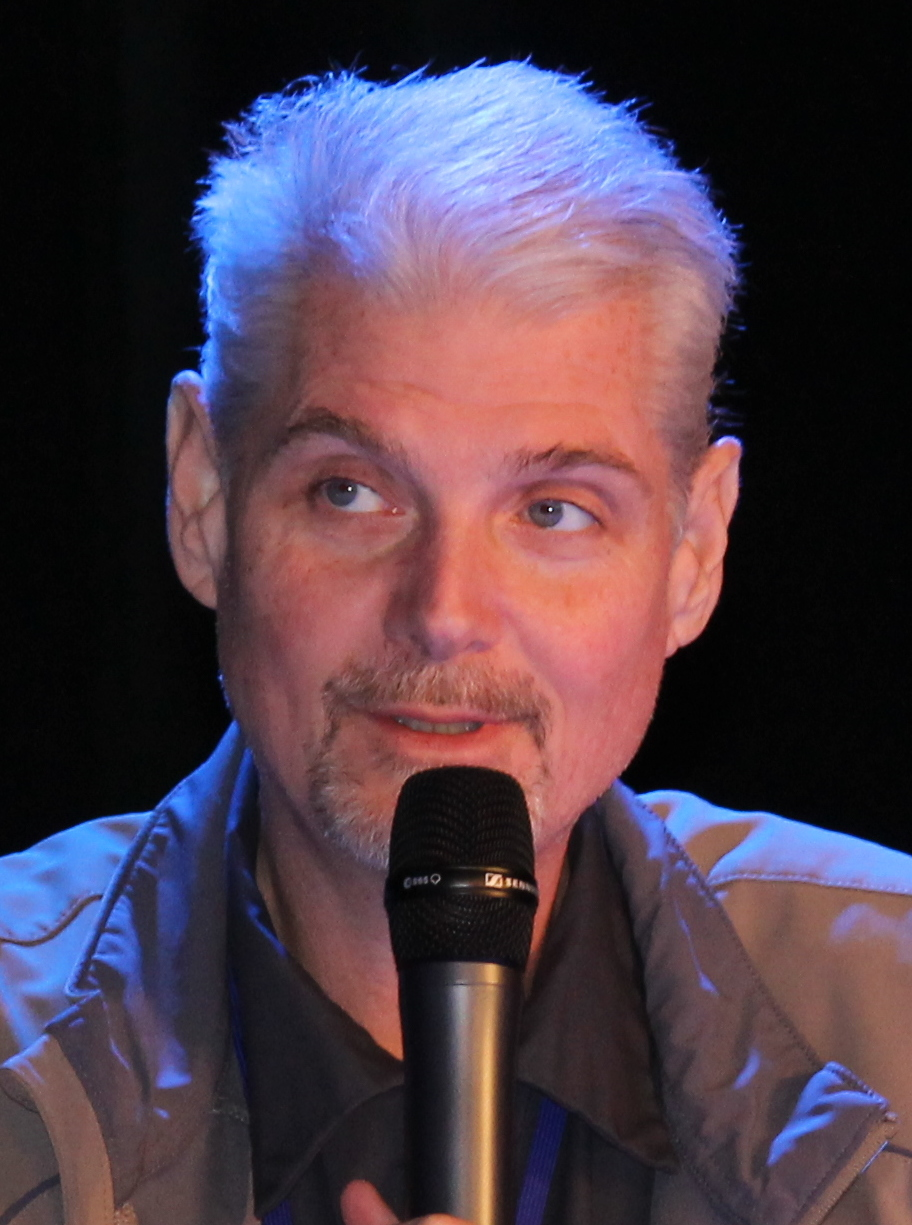
Tom Kane

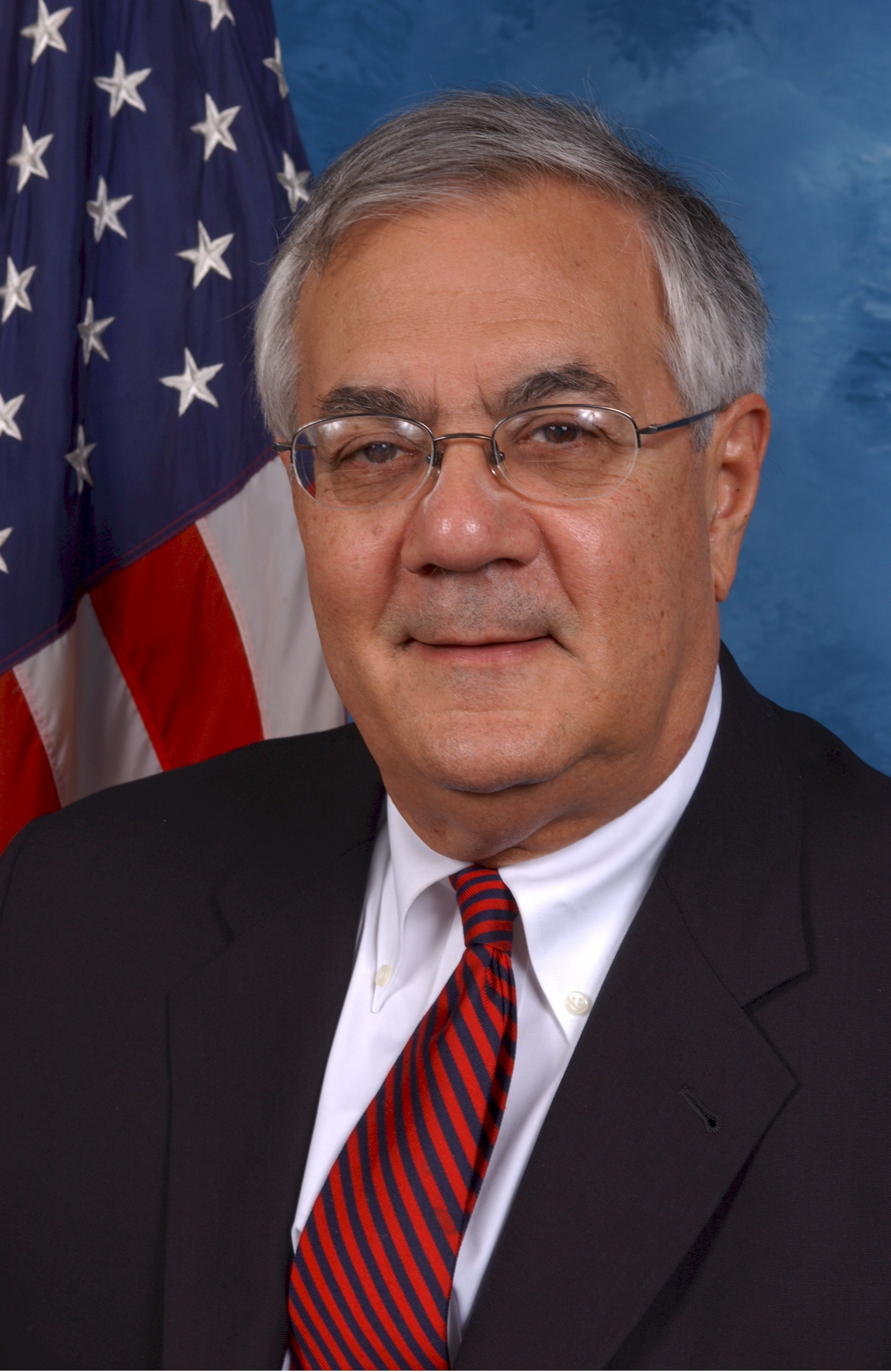
Barney Frank

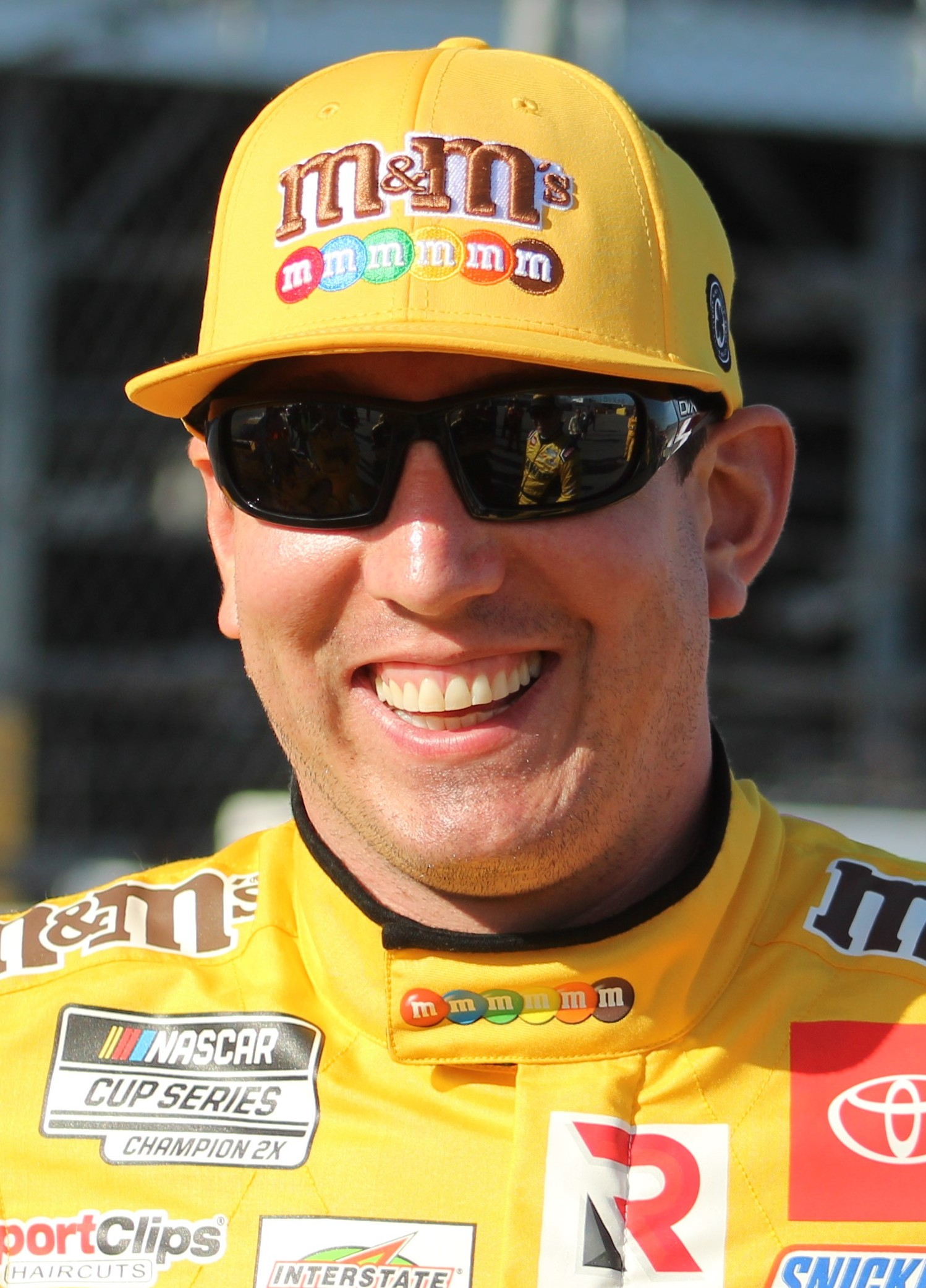
Kyle Busch

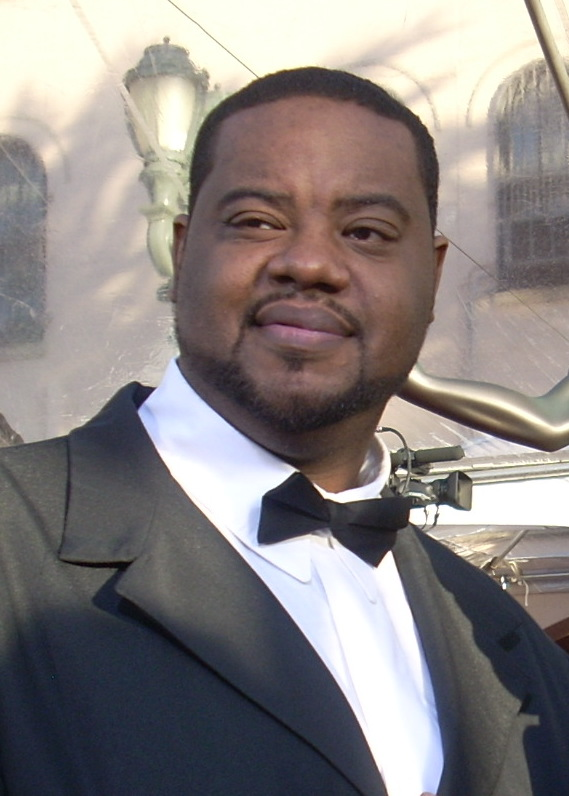
Grizz Chapman

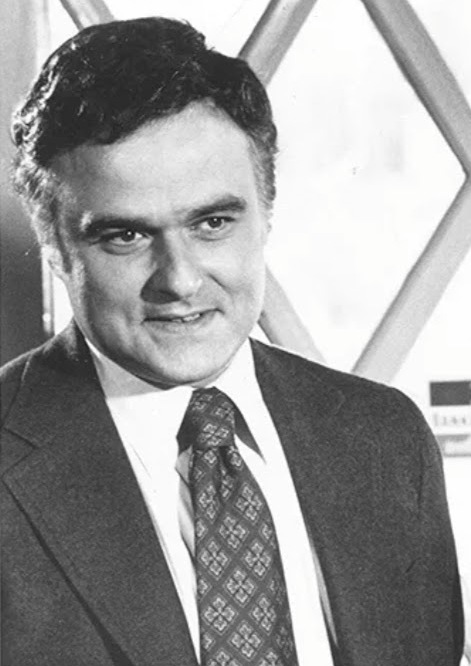
Charles Cioffi

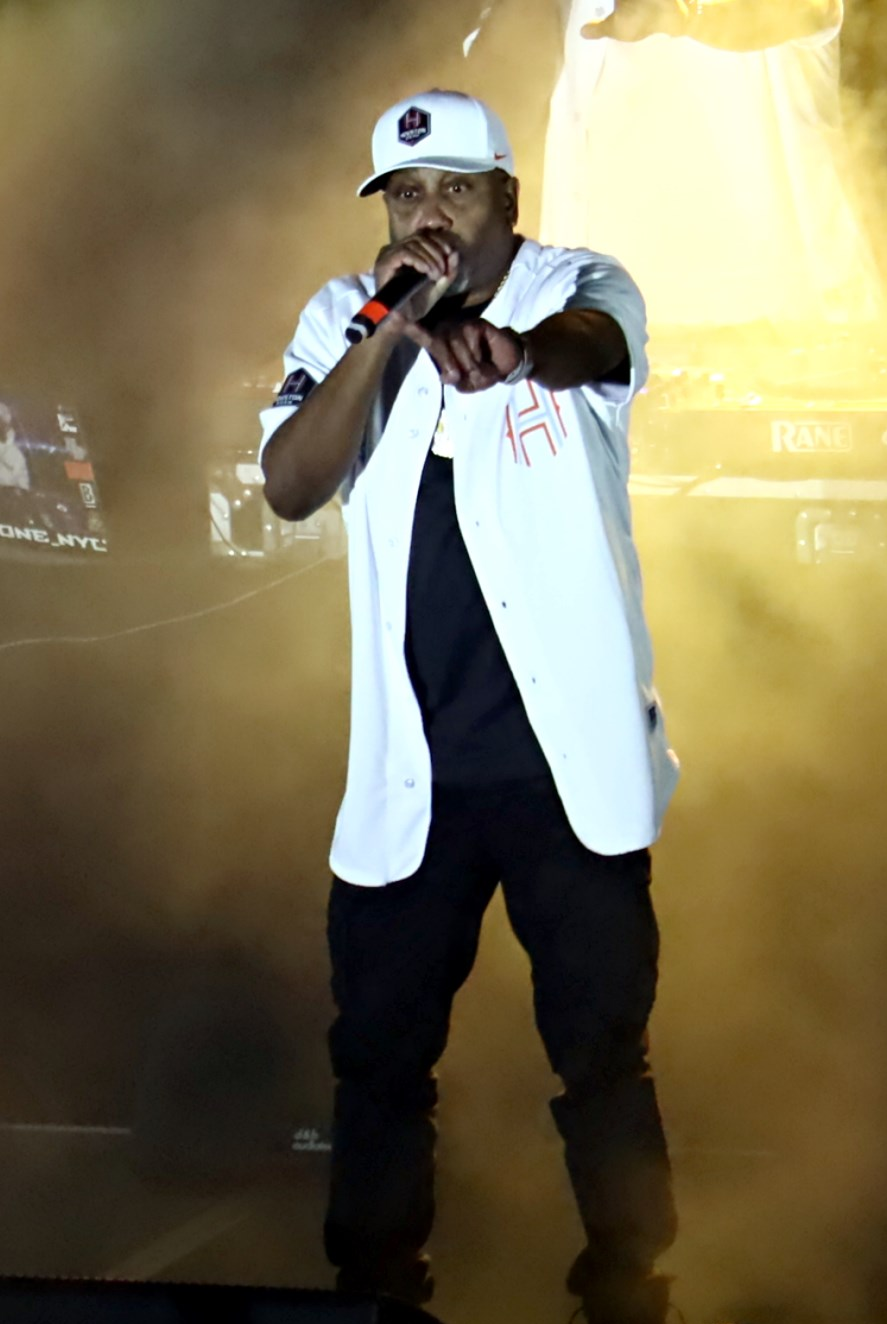
Rob Base

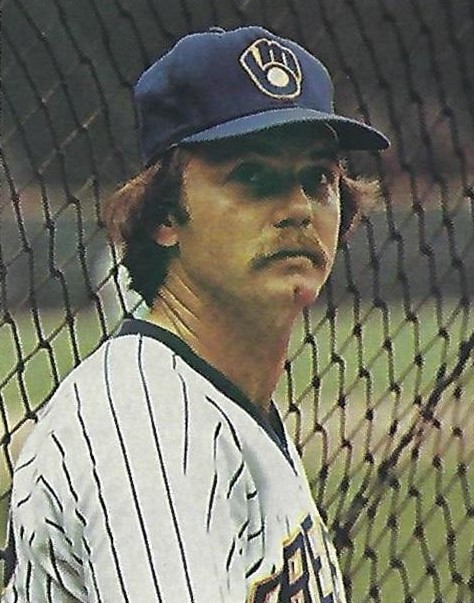
Charlie Moore

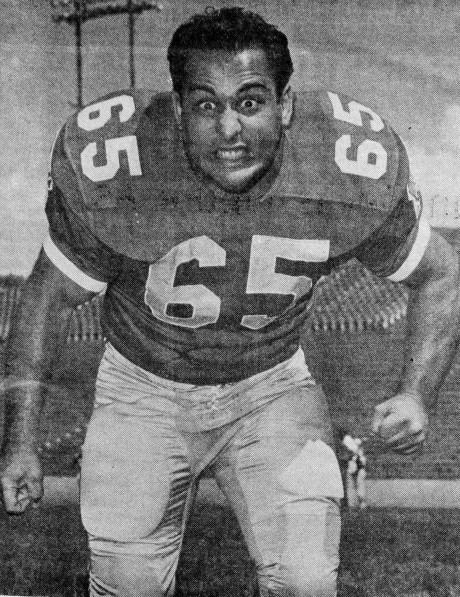
Manny Fernandez

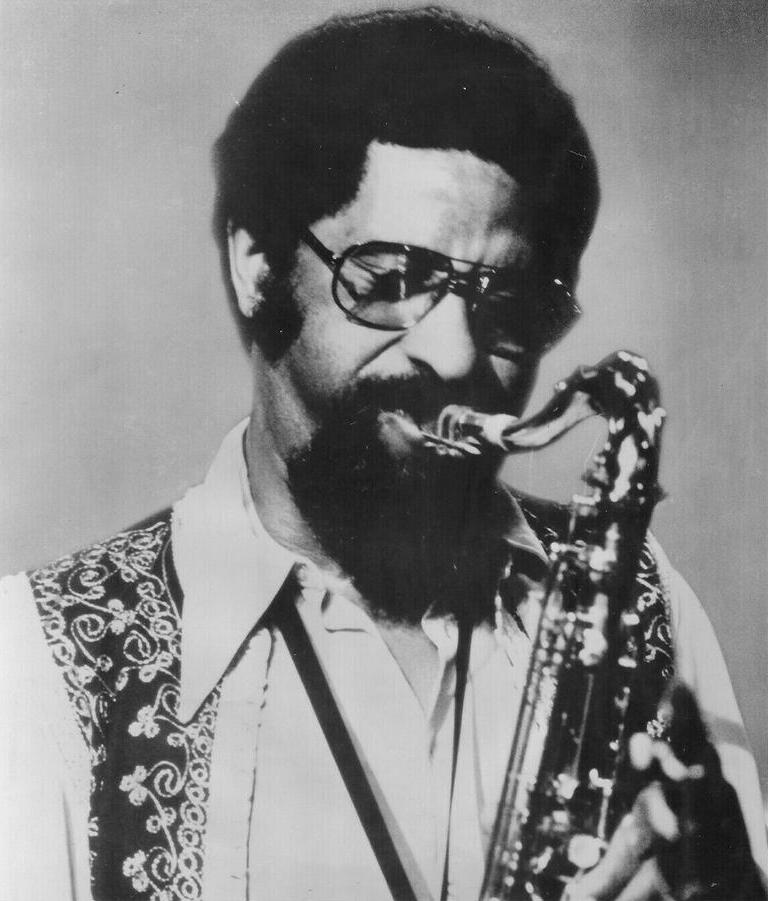
Sonny Rollins

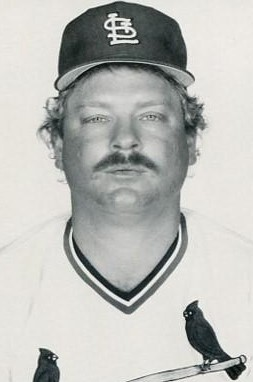
Bob Horner

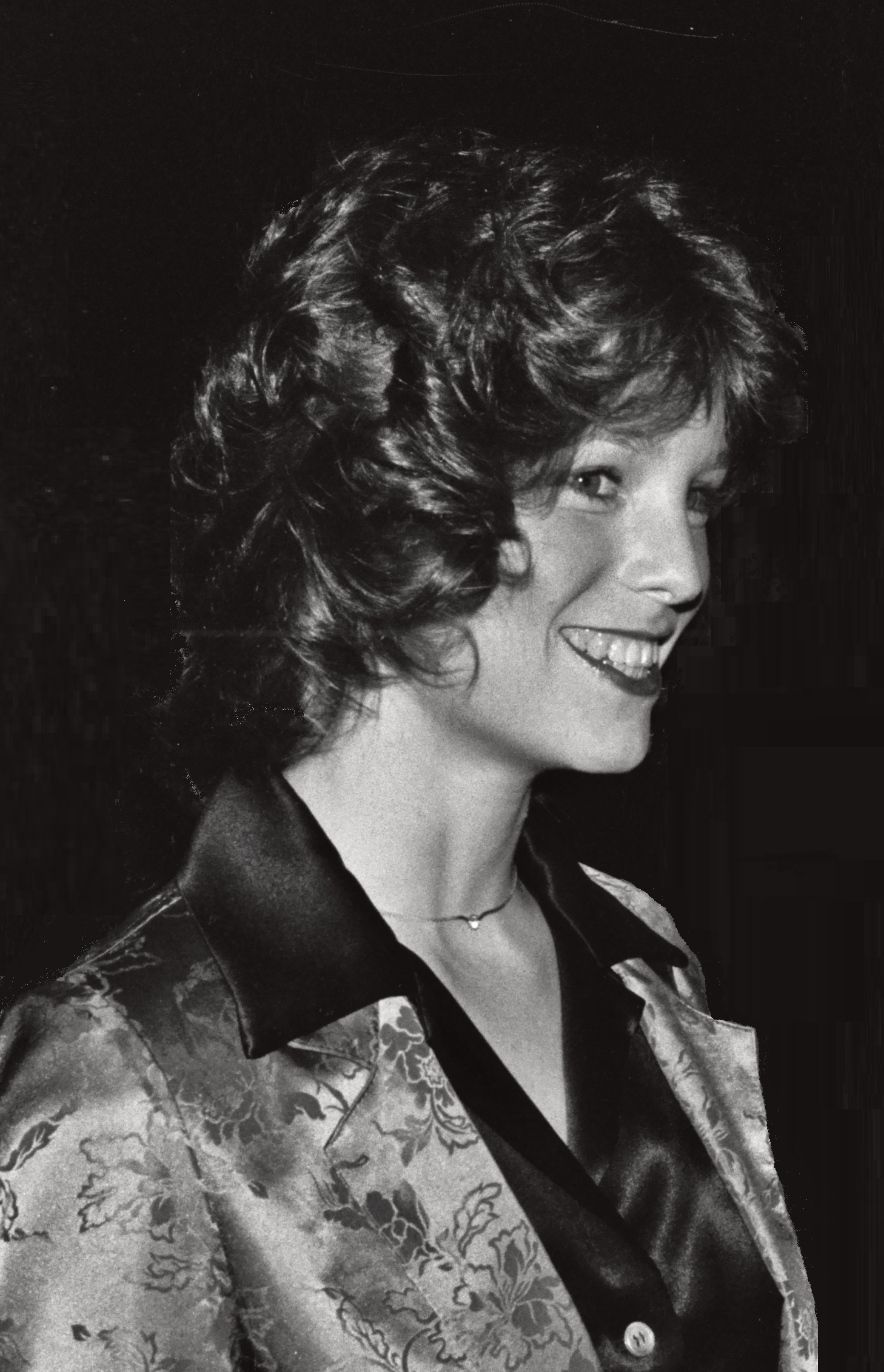
Kelly Curtis

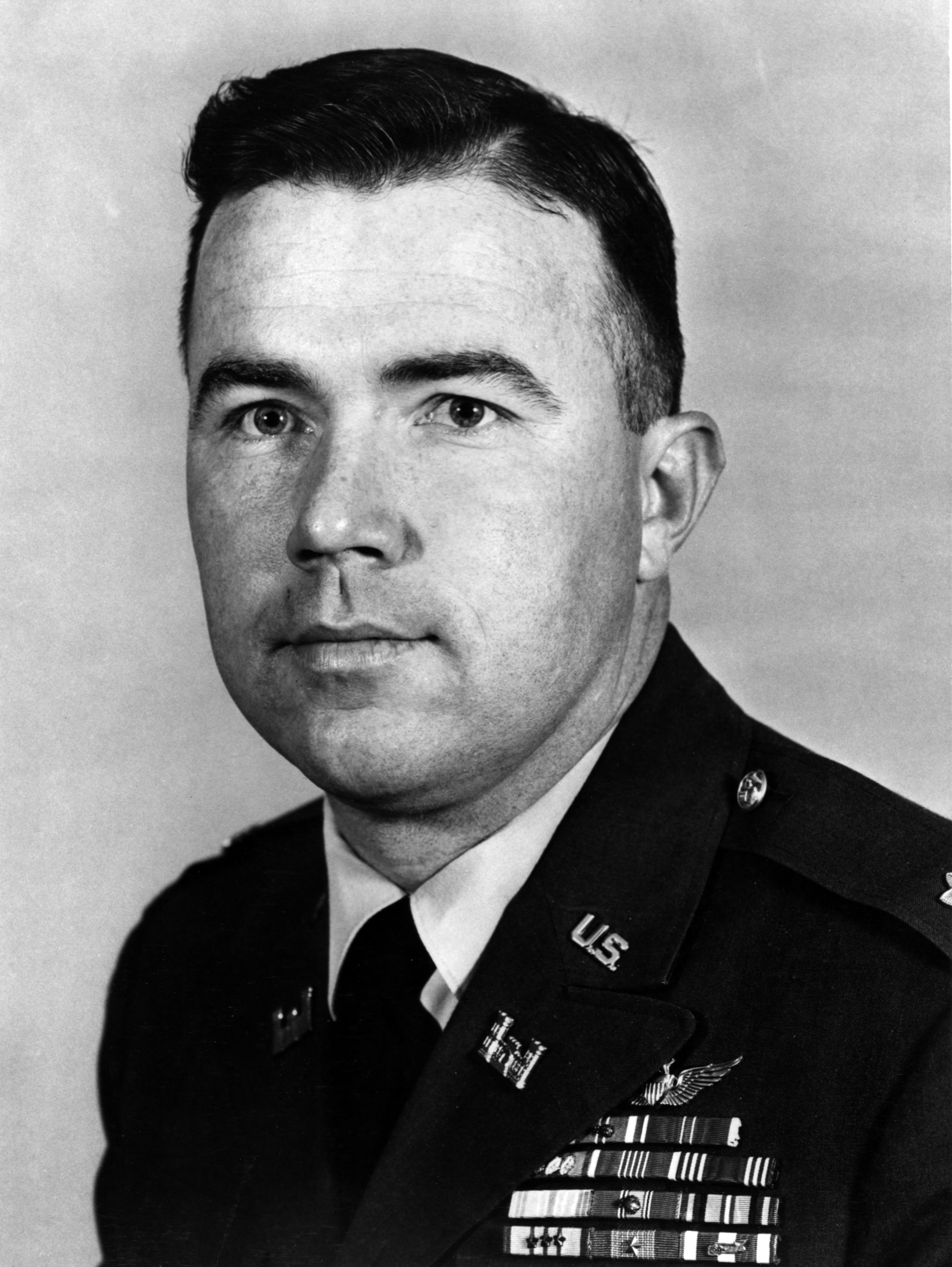
Bruce P. Crandall

- May 1
  - G. Robert Blakey, 90, attorney, drafter of the RICO act
  - Juliet Winters Carpenter, 77, translator of literature
  - René Henry Gracida, 102, Roman Catholic prelate, bishop of Corpus Christi (1983–1997) and Pensacola–Tallahassee (1975–1983)
  - Alfredrick Hughes, 63, basketball player (San Antonio Spurs)
  - Greg Hyman, 78, inventor, co-creator of Tickle Me Elmo
  - Danny Mixon, 76, jazz pianist
  - Stephen Owen, 79, sinologist
- May 2
  - Castell V. Bryant, 88, academic administrator, president of Florida A&M University (2005–2007)
  - Chet Dobis, 83, politician, member of the Indiana House of Representatives (1970–2012)
  - Doris F. Fisher, 94, businesswoman (Gap Inc.)
  - Emily Grosholz, 75, poet
  - David Kendall, 68, television writer and producer (Boy Meets World, Growing Pains) and film director (Dirty Deeds)
  - James Lawrence King, 98, jurist, judge (since 1970) and chief judge (1984–1991) of the U.S. District Court for the Southern District of Florida
  - Peter R. Moody Jr., 82, political scientist and sinologist
  - Ben Morea, 84, artist and anarchist activist
  - Donald Sidney-Fryer, 91, poet, critic and literary historian
  - Martin C. Weisskopf, 84, space scientist
- May 3
  - Charles W. Curtis, 99, mathematician and historian
  - William Daniel Mayer, 84, politician, member of the Maryland House of Delegates (2005–2007)
  - Lee Allen Zeno, 71, bassist
- May 4
  - David Plowden, 93, photographer
  - Bob Skinner, 94, baseball player and manager (Pittsburgh Pirates, St. Louis Cardinals, Philadelphia Phillies)
  - Robert A. Stebbins, 87, American-born Canadian sociologist
  - John Sterling, 87, sportscaster (New York Yankees, Atlanta Braves)
  - Jonathan Tiersten, 60, actor (Sleepaway Camp, Return to Sleepaway Camp, The Perfect House)
  - George Trahern, 89, politician, member of the Oregon House of Representatives (1981–1988)
- May 5
  - Bob Belden, 78, football player (Dallas Cowboys)
  - Evelyn Cox, 66, country and bluegrass singer and musician (The Cox Family)
  - Crystal R. Emery, 65, film director and producer (The Deadliest Disease in America)
  - Peter Ferrara, 71, lawyer and policy analyst
  - Kyle Loftis, 43, internet personality and businessman
  - Donald Ross, 85, politician, member of the Oklahoma House of Representatives (1983–2003)
- May 6
  - Judith Barnard, 94, writer (Judith Michael)
  - Harold K. Brown, 92, civil rights leader
  - Russ Hodge, 86, Olympic decathlete
  - Manuela Hoelterhoff, 77, German-born cultural journalist (Bloomberg News)
  - Dick Hughes, 88, baseball player (St. Louis Cardinals)
  - Mert Lawwill, 85, motorcycle racer and designer, subject of On Any Sunday
  - John L. Marion, 92, auctioneer
  - Lawrence J. Smith, 85, politician, member of the U.S. House of Representatives (1983–1993)
  - Ted Turner, 87, businessman and television producer
  - Morris Watts, 88, football player (Tulsa) and coach
- May 7
  - Michael J. Bransfield, 82, Roman Catholic prelate, bishop of Wheeling–Charleston (2004–2018)
  - Pat Caputo, 67, sportswriter and broadcaster (WXYT-FM)
  - Philip Caputo, 84,author (A Rumor of War) and journalist
  - Rick Kreuger, 77, baseball player (Boston Red Sox)
  - Joni Lamb, 65, Christian broadcaster, co-founder and president of Daystar Television Network
  - Bede Liu, 91, Taiwanese-born electrical engineer
  - Earl-Jean McCrea, 83, singer (The Cookies)
  - Joe Senser, 69, football player and broadcaster (Minnesota Vikings)
- May 8
  - Betty Broderick, 78, convicted murderer
  - Joe Sedelmaier, 92, American television advertising director
  - Kiara St. James, 52–53, transgender activist
  - Joyce Woodhouse, 82, politician, member of the Nevada Senate (2006–2010, 2012–2020)
- May 9
  - Bobby Cox, 84, Hall of Fame baseball manager (Atlanta Braves, Toronto Blue Jays), player, and coach, World Series champion (1977, 1995)
  - Thomas G. Darling, 94, American air force general (death announced on this date)
  - Robert D. Garton, 92, politician, member of the Indiana House of Representatives (1970–2006)
  - Alan Gribben, 84, literary scholar
  - Jennifer Harmon, 82, actress (How to Survive a Marriage, One Life to Live)
  - Craig Morton, 83, football player (Denver Broncos)
  - Bill Posey, 78, politician, member of the U.S. House of Representatives (2009–2025)
  - Dennis Rush, 74, actor (Man of a Thousand Faces, The Andy Griffith Show, Wagon Train).
  - Gerald Talbot, 94, politician and civil rights leader, member of the Maine House of Representatives (1972–1978)
  - Warren Tipton, singer (The Chi-Lites)
  - Margareta Waterman, 93, poet and publisher
- May 10
  - Jim Colbert, 85, golfer
  - Jan E. DuBois, 95, jurist, judge of the U.S. District Court for Eastern Pennsylvania (since 1988)
  - Abraham Foxman, 86, lawyer and activist, director of the Anti-Defamation League (1987–2015)
  - Mary Lovelace O'Neal, 84, artist and arts educator
  - Mark Ratner, 83 chemist
  - Kenneth B. Wiberg, 98, chemist
- May 11
  - Buzz Capra, 78, baseball player (New York Mets, Atlanta Braves)
  - Brandon Clarke, 29, Canadian-born basketball player (Memphis Grizzlies)
  - Jack Douglas, 80, record producer (Toys in the Attic, Rocks, Double Fantasy)
  - Lou Graham, 88, golfer, U.S. Open champion (1975)
  - David Lee, 82, football player (Baltimore Colts)
  - Xuong Nguyen-Huu, 92, biochemist
- May 12
  - Patrick Arnold, 59, organic chemist
  - Barry W. Blaustein, 71, screenwriter (Coming to America, The Nutty Professor) and film director (Beyond the Mat)
  - Jason Collins, 47, basketball player (New Jersey Nets, Atlanta Hawks, Boston Celtics)
  - John Thomas Copenhaver Jr., 100, jurist, judge of the U.S. District Court for Southern West Virginia (since 1976)
  - Mark Fuhrman, 74, American detective (Murder trial of O. J. Simpson), throat cancer.
  - Donald Gibb, 71, actor (Revenge of the Nerds, Bloodsport, 1st & Ten)
  - Bobby Keasler, 80, college football coach (McNeese State Cowboys, Louisiana-Monroe Warhawks)
  - Rex Reed, 87, film critic (The New York Observer), journalist, and actor (Inchon, Myra Breckinridge)
  - William V. Tamborlane, 79, pediatrician and academic
  - Jack Taylor, 99, actor (Succubus, Conan the Barbarian, The Ninth Gate)
  - Charle Young, 75, Hall of Fame football player (San Francisco 49ers, Philadelphia Eagles), Super Bowl champion (1982)
- May 13
  - Clarence Carter, 90, singer-songwriter ("Slip Away", "Patches", "Strokin'")
  - David Morelock, 94, opera director
- May 14
  - James F. Almand, 77, politician, member of the Virginia House of Delegates (1978–2004)
  - Thomas E. Breidenthal, 75, Episcopal prelate, bishop of Southern Ohio (2007–2020)
  - David Henderson, 83, writer and poet
  - Raymond Eugene Johnson, 52, convicted murderer
  - Claudine Longet, 84, French-born singer and actress (McHale's Navy, The Party)
  - Pete Naaden, 98, politician, member of the North Dakota House of Representatives (1973–2000)
  - Fred Nesler, 81, politician, member of the Kentucky House of Representatives (1993–2014)
  - Morris Soller, 94–95, American-born Israeli agricultural geneticist (death announced on this date)
- May 15
  - Jane Healy, 77, journalist (Orlando Sentinel)
  - Sherman Lewis, 83, football player (Toronto Argonauts, New York Jets) and coach (Green Bay Packers), four-time Super Bowl champion
  - Brian Lindstrom, 65, documentary filmmaker (Alien Boy: The Life and Death of James Chasse), complications from progressive supranuclear palsy
  - Jon Phipps McCalla, 79, jurist, judge (since 1992) and chief judge (2008–2013) of the U.S. District Court for the Western District of Tennessee
  - Edmund Phelps, 92, economist, Nobel Prize laureate (2006)
  - Tony Zappone, 78, journalist and radio personality
- May 16
  - Gary Cutsinger, 86, football player (Houston Oilers)
  - John A. Lent, 90, comics scholar, founder of the International Journal of Comics Art
  - Dennis Locorriere, 76, singer and guitarist (Dr. Hook)
  - Quinn G. McKay, 99, academic, writer and Mormon leader
  - Ryan Porter, 46, American jazz trombonist (West Coast Get Down)
  - James Robison, 82, American televangelist.
  - Ike Willis, 70, vocalist and guitarist (Frank Zappa)
- May 17
  - Peter G. Neumann, 93, computer science researcher
  - Brenda Travis, 81, civil rights campaigner
- May 18
  - Piper J. Drake, 49, author
  - Jerry Grey, 62, American professional wrestler
  - Crawford Henry, 88, tennis player
  - Tom Kane, 64, voice actor (The Powerpuff Girls, Star Wars, The Wild Thornberrys)
  - Patriotic Kenny, 84, navy veteran and influencer
  - Meredith Lillich, 94, art historian
  - Caitlin O'Heaney, 73, actress (Tales of the Gold Monkey, He Knows You're Alone, Apple Pie)
  - Carey Scurry, 63, basketball player (Utah Jazz, New York Knicks)
  - Gregory D. Shorey Jr., 101, politician, chairman of the South Carolina Republican Party (1958–1961)
  - Marideth Sisco, 82, author and musician
- May 19
  - Jacob Cress, 81, furniture maker
  - Barney Frank, 86, politician, member of the U.S. House of Representatives (1981–2013)
  - Al Hurricane Jr., 66, singer-songwriter (death announced on this date)
  - Barbara Lenk, 75, jurist, judge of the Massachusetts Supreme Judicial Court (2011–2020)
  - Mike Purzycki, 80–81, politician, mayor of Wilmington, Delaware (2017–2025)
  - Walt Rock, 84, football player (San Francisco 49ers, Washington Commanders, Florida Blazers)
  - Herb Wilkinson, 102, basketball player (Utah Redskins, Iowa Hawkeyes)
  - Robert Woodson, 89, political activist
- May 20
  - Ron Escheté, 77, jazz guitarist
  - Diane Carlson Evans, 79, army nurse
  - Phil Hickerson, 79, American professional wrestler (CWA, USWA)
  - Jimmy Hughes, 88, rhythm and blues singer ("Steal Away")
  - Jeffrey Lane, 71, television writer (Ryan's Hope, Mad About You) and playwright (Dirty Rotten Scoundrels)
  - Leroy Dean McGill, 63, convicted murderer and arsonist
  - Cleve Moler, 86, mathematician and computer programmer (MATLAB, MathWorks)
  - Tom Moore, 81, football player (The Citadel Bulldogs) and coach (Clemson Tigers, Gardner–Webb Runnin' Bulldogs)
  - Manny Nosowsky, 94, crossword puzzle creator
  - John Huston Ricard, 86, Roman Catholic prelate, bishop of Pensacola–Tallahassee (1997–2011) and auxiliary bishop of Baltimore (1984–1997)
- May 21
  - Kyle Busch, 41, American racing driver (NASCAR), two-time Cup Series champion (2015, 2019)
  - Julienne Bušić, 77, writer, hijacker (TWA Flight 355), and activist
  - John M. Fabian, 87, astronaut (STS-7, STS-51-G)
  - Howard Fendrich, 55, sportswriter (Associated Press)
  - Peter Helm, 84, Canadian-born actor (Inside Daisy Clover, The Andromeda Strain, The Longest Day)
  - Rafe Pomerance, 79, environmentalist
  - Gerald M. Pomper, 91, political scientist
  - Karl E. Weick, 89, organizational theorist
- May 22
  - Rob Base, 59, rapper (Rob Base & DJ E-Z Rock) and songwriter ("It Takes Two", "Joy and Pain")
  - Lucille Berrien, 98, politician and civil rights activist
  - Grizz Chapman, 52, actor (30 Rock)
  - Charles Cioffi, 90, actor (Get Christie Love!, Shaft, Klute)
  - Jonathan L. Foote, 90, architect
  - Clarence B. Jones, 95, lawyer and counsel
  - Richard A. Tapia, 88, mathematician
- May 23
  - Philip Aaberg, 77, pianist
  - Ann Fox Chandonnet, 83, poet
  - Charlie Moore, 72, baseball player (Milwaukee Brewers, Toronto Blue Jays)
  - William W. Parmley, 90, cardiologist
  - Dang Van Phuoc, 90, Vietnamese-born photojournalist
  - Arleen Schloss, 82, performance artist
  - Ruth Shack, 94, politician and civil rights activist (Save Our Children)
  - Albert Wolsky, 95, French-born costume designer (All That Jazz, Bugsy, Revolutionary Road), Oscar winner (1980, 1992)
- May 24
  - John Eaton, 91, jazz pianist
  - Manny Fernandez, 79, football player (Miami Dolphins), Super Bowl champion (1973, 1974)
- May 25
  - Raymond Berry, 93, Hall of Fame football player (Baltimore Colts) and coach (New England Patriots, Detroit Lions)
  - Frankie Duarte, 71, super bantamweight boxer (WBC)
  - Russell M. Pitzer, 88, chemist
  - Gary L. Pudney, 91, television executive (ABC)
  - Sonny Rollins, 95, jazz saxophonist ("Airegin", "Doxy", "St. Thomas")
  - Kathryn Sessions, 84, politician, member of the Wyoming Senate (1999–2011) and House of Representatives (1993–1998)
  - Benjamin Swan, 92, politician, member of the Massachusetts House of Representatives (1995–2017)
- May 26
  - Mark Bailey, 64, baseball player (Houston Astros, San Francisco Giants)
  - Robert Daley, 96, writer, journalist and police officer
  - Florence Denmark, 94, psychologist, president of APA (1980–1981).
  - Bob Horner, 68, baseball player (Arizona State Sun Devils, Atlanta Braves, St. Louis Cardinals)
  - Marc Johnson, 49, skateboarder
  - R. Fred Lewis, 78, judge, justice of the Supreme Court of Florida (1998–2019)
  - Donald Newhouse, 96, mass media owner and publisher (Advance Publications)
  - Terry Don Phillips, 78, college athletics administrator (Clemson Tigers)
  - Alan Saret, 81, postminimalist artist
  - Howard Storm, 94, actor (Take the Money and Run) and director (Mork & Mindy, Once Bitten)
- May 27
  - John Amari, 77, politician, member of the Alabama House of Representatives (1978–1982) and Senate (1982–1998)
  - George Bork, 84, Hall of Fame football player (Northern Illinois Huskies, Montreal Alouettes)
  - Paul Dorpat, 87, historian
  - Marcia Lucas, 80, film editor (Star Wars, Taxi Driver, American Graffiti), Oscar winner (1978)
  - Jay Milder, 92, painter
  - Jim Rutt, 72, businessman
  - Joe Schwarz, 88, politician, member of the U.S. House of Representatives (2005–2007) and Michigan Senate (1987–2002)
- May 29
  - Bill Clapp, 84, philanthropist
  - Bobby Crockett, 83, football player (Buffalo Bills)
  - Larry King, 81, tennis promoter
- May 30
  - Kelly Curtis, 69, actress (The Devil's Daughter, Trading Places, False Arrest)
  - Speight Jenkins, 89, music director and critic
  - Ronald LaPread, 76, musician (Commodores)
  - Joe Negri, 99, jazz guitarist and educator
  - Foster Sylvers, 64, singer (The Sylvers)
  - Rick Treadway, 56, racing driver (Indy Racing League)
- May 31
  - Bruce P. Crandall, 93, Army aviator, Medal of Honor recipient
  - Alan L. Gropman, 88, Air Force colonel
  - Cleo Littleton, 93, basketball player (Wichita State Shockers)
  - Curt Newsome, 67, football coach (Virginia Tech Hokies, Emory and Henry Wasps)
  - Jay Silva, 45, Angolan-born mixed martial artist
  - Dexter Wansel, 75, keyboardist (MFSB), songwriter ("If Only You Knew"), and record producer ("Love T.K.O.")

== June ==
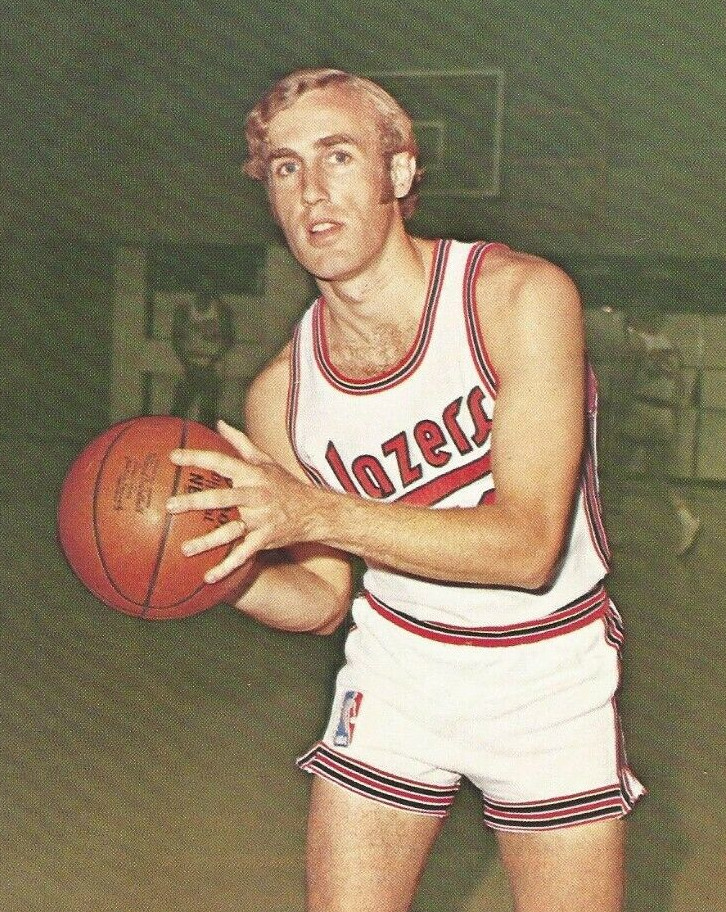
Rick Adelman

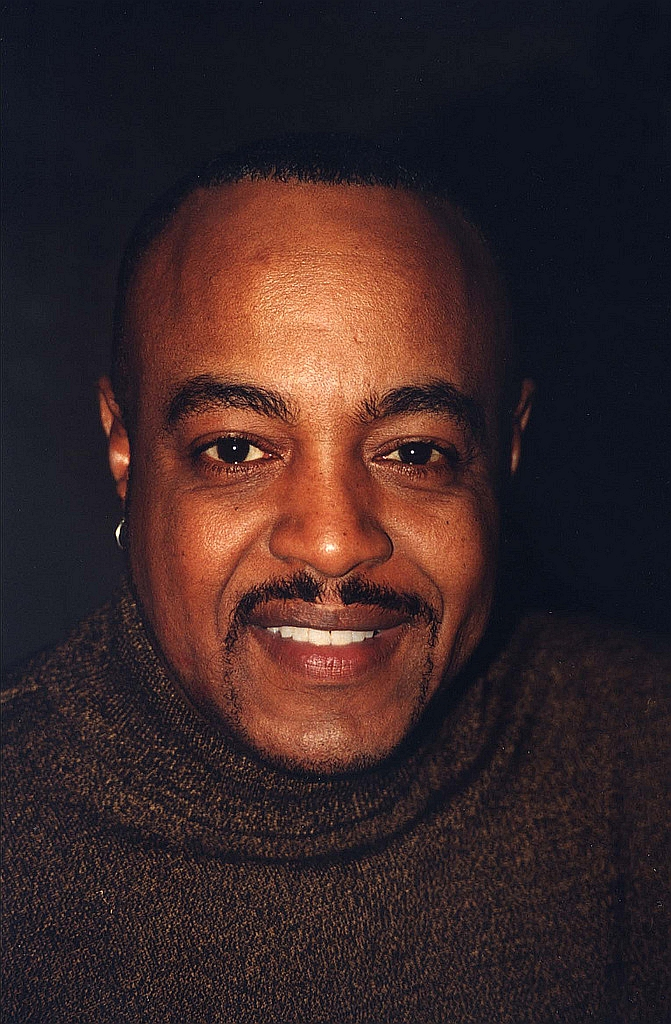
Peabo Bryson

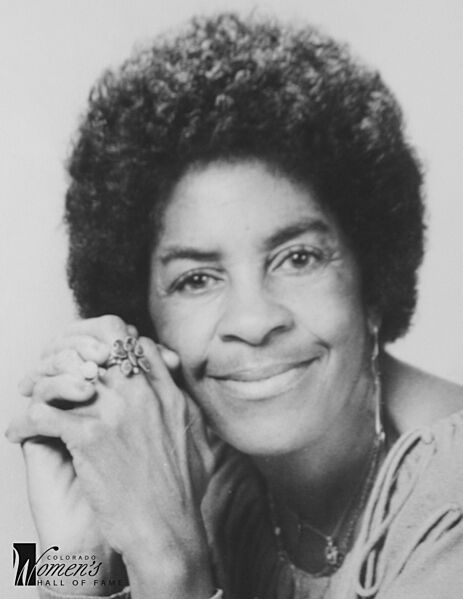
Mildred Pitts Walter

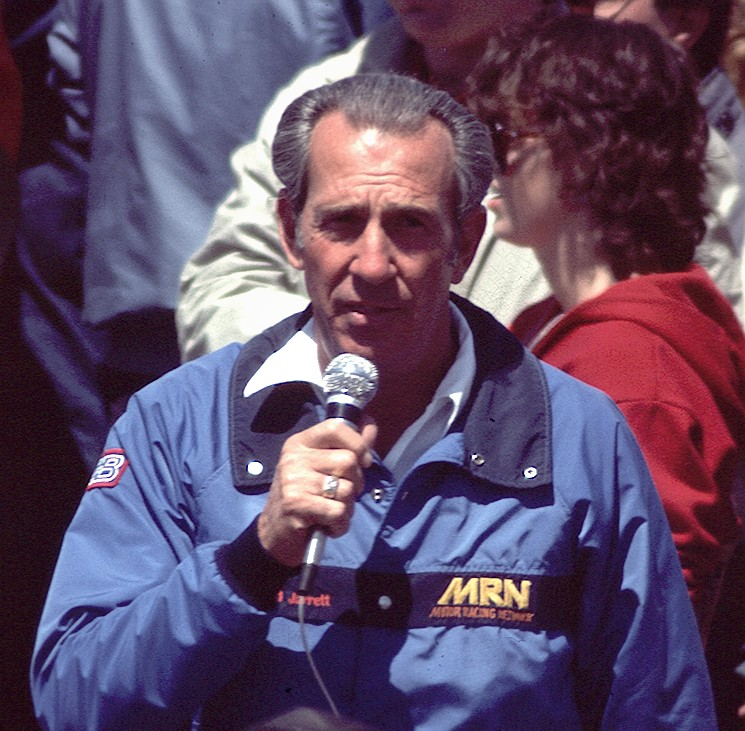
Ned Jarrett

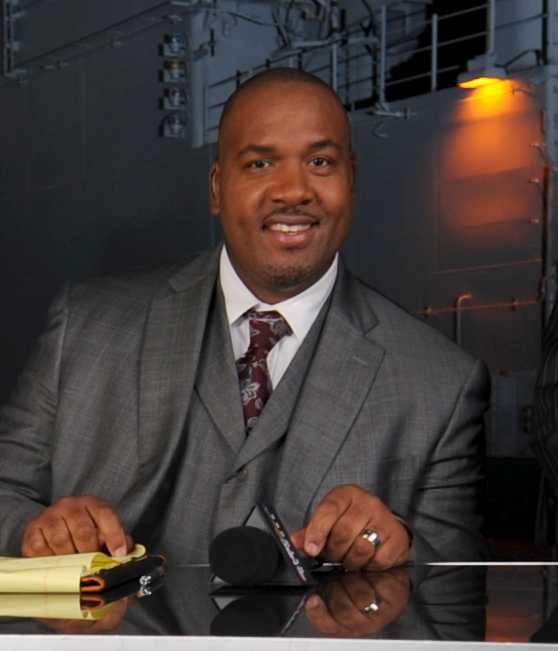
Stacey King

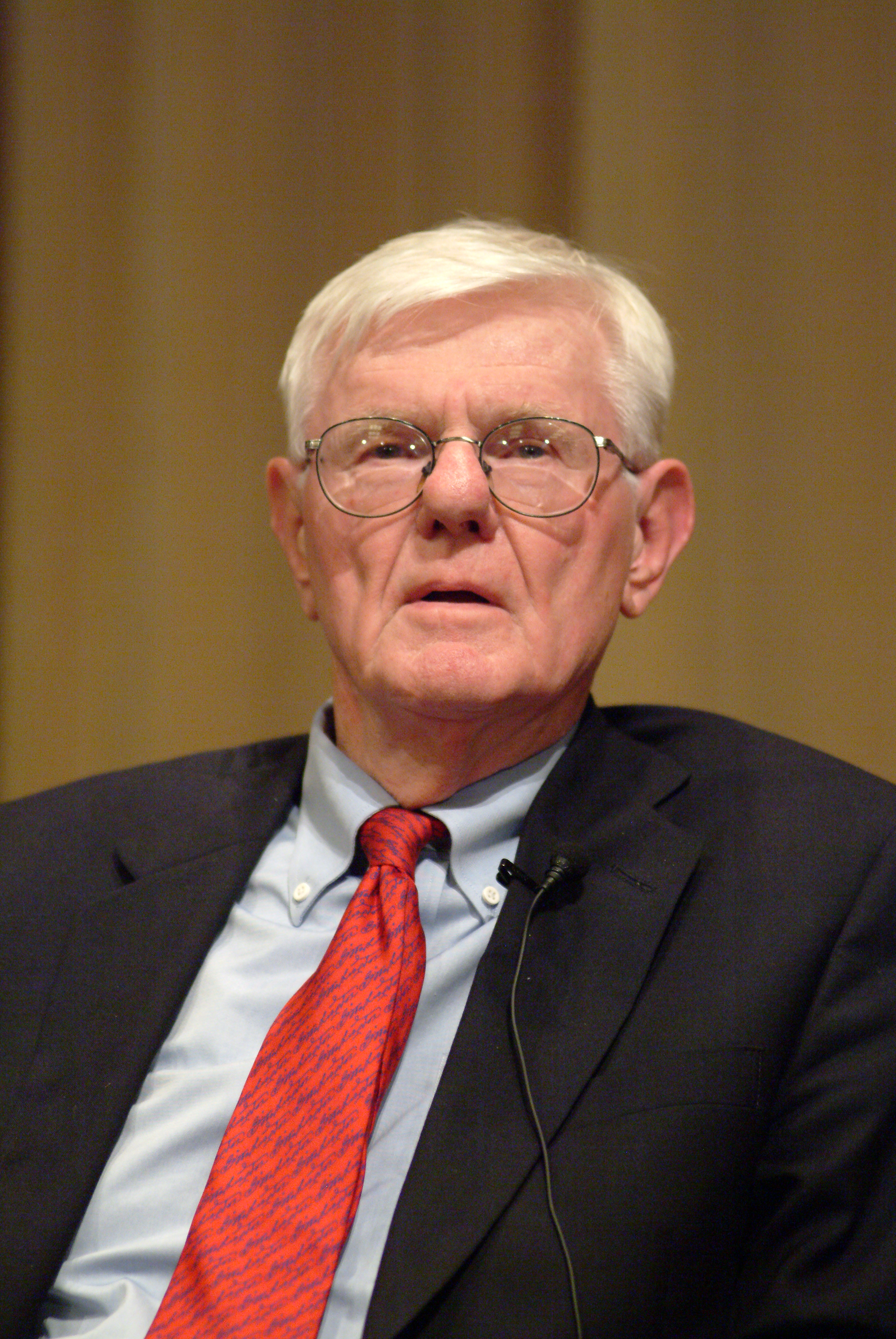
Gordon S. Wood

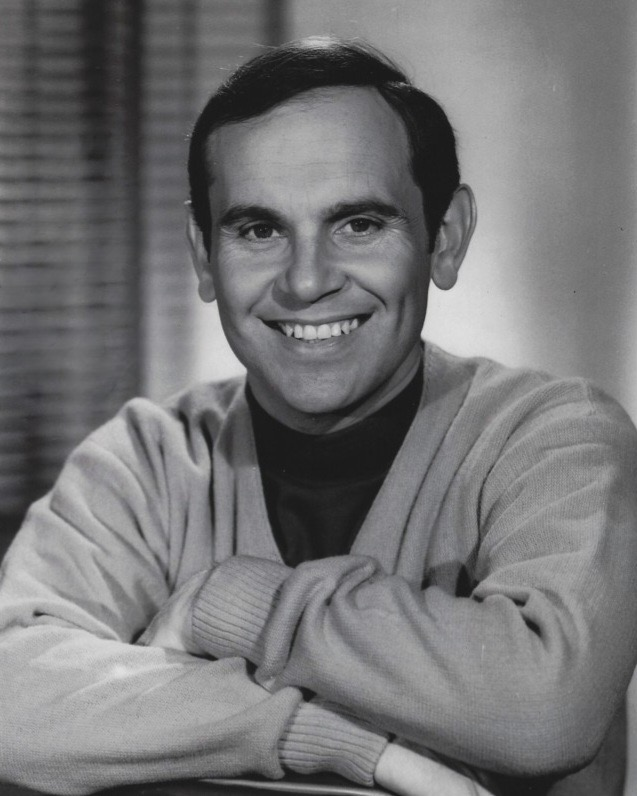
Ronnie Schell

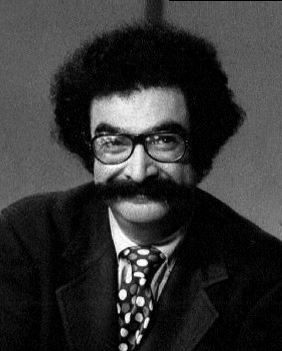
Gene Shalit

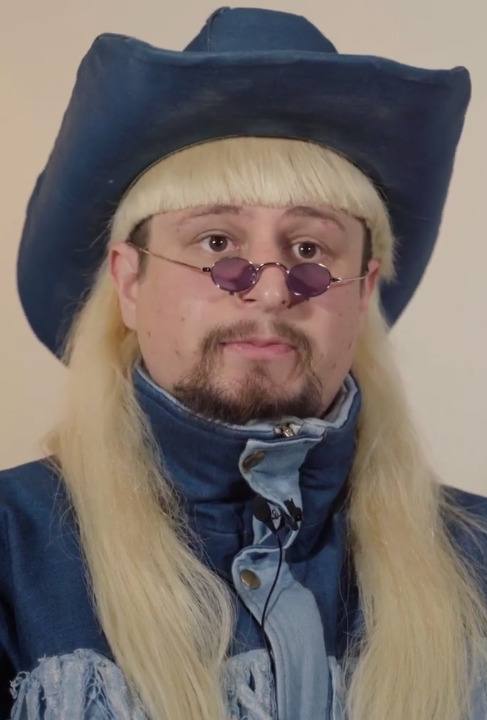
Oliver Tree

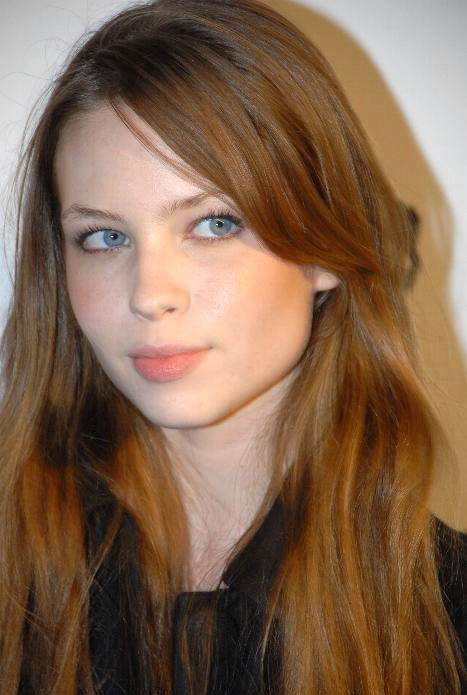
Daveigh Chase

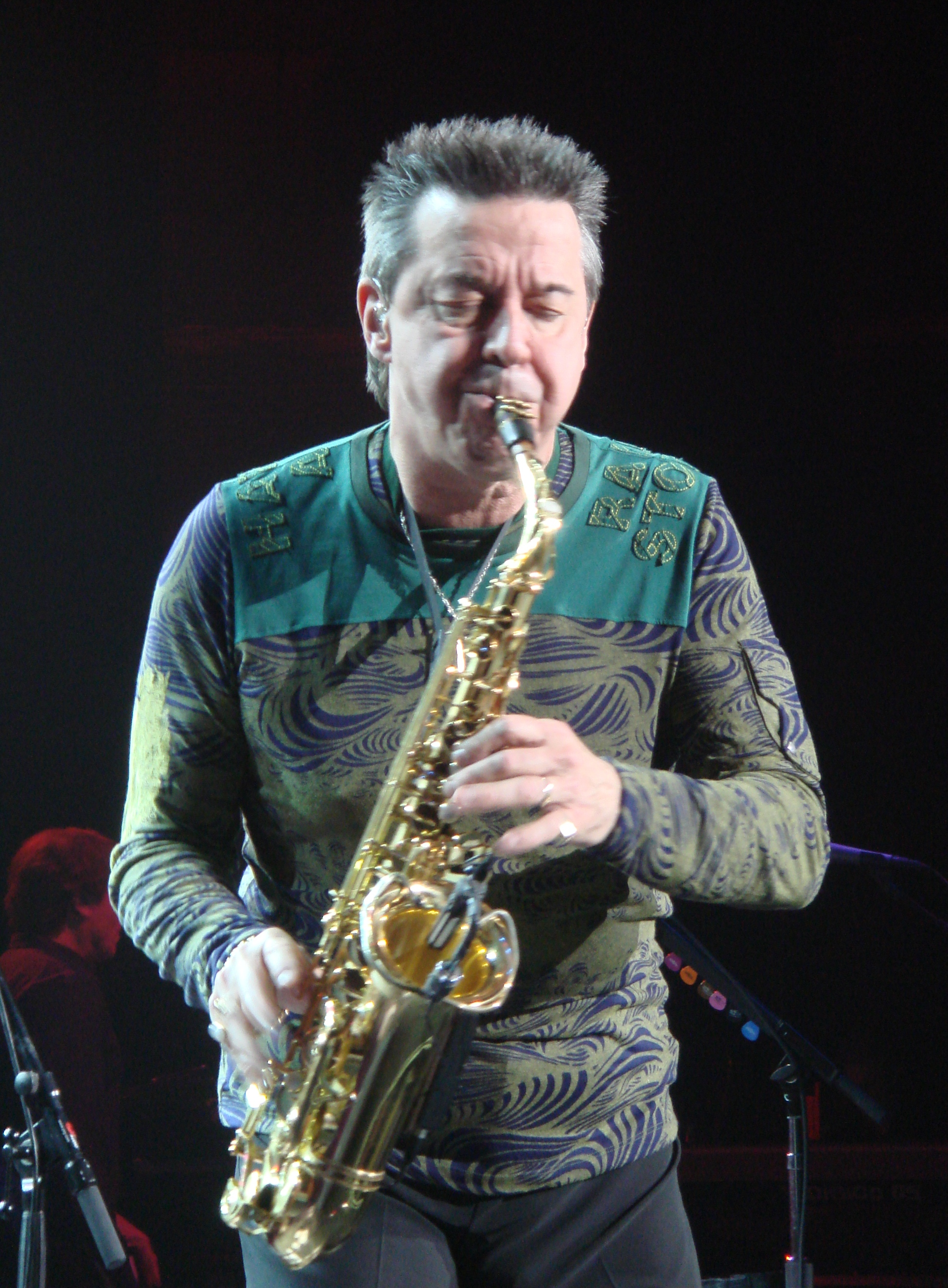
Walter Parazaider

- June 1
  - Rick Adelman, 79, Hall of Fame basketball player and coach (Portland Trail Blazers, Sacramento Kings, Houston Rockets)
  - Keith Anthony Morrison, 84, Jamaican-born
- June 2
  - Andy Bishop, 61, racing cyclist
  - Peabo Bryson, 75, singer ("If Ever You're in My Arms Again", "Beauty and the Beast", "A Whole New World"), Grammy winner (1993, 1994)
  - David J. Halberstam, 74, radio executive (Westwood One) and sports broadcaster (Miami Heat, St. John's Red Storm)
  - Ray Lampkin, 78, boxer
  - Casey Luna, 95, racing team owner and politician, lieutenant governor of New Mexico (1991–1995)
  - Mildred Pitts Walter, 103, writer (death announced on this date)
- June 3
  - Rocky Allen, 71, talk radio personality
  - Charlie Cunningham, 77, mountain biker, co-founder of Wilderness Trail Bikes (death announced on this date)
  - James Handy, 81, actor (Top Gun: Maverick, Jumanji, Alias)
  - Max Kleven, 92, Norwegian-born stuntman and second unit director (Back to the Future, Batman Returns, The River Wild)
  - Peter Potichnyj, 96, Polish-Ukrainian-born political scientist and historian
  - James Blood Ulmer, 86, guitarist
  - Price Wallace, 64, politician, member of the Mississippi House of Representatives (since 2018)
  - Norma Yaeger, 96, stockbroker
- June 4
  - George Berzsenyi, 87, Hungarian-born mathematician
  - Robert Coles, 97, child psychiatrist and author
  - Eddie Haas, 91, baseball player (Chicago Cubs, Milwaukee Braves) and manager (Atlanta Braves)
  - Nathan Irby, 94, politician, member of the Maryland Senate (1982–1995)
  - Greg James, 71, tattoo artist
  - Ned Jarrett, 93, Hall of Fame racing driver (NASCAR) and broadcaster, two-time Cup Series champion (1961, 1965)
  - Bob Lacey, 72, baseball player (Oakland Athletics, San Francisco Giants, Cleveland Indians)
  - John D. Ong, 92, manufacturing industry executive and diplomat, CEO of Goodrich Corporation (1979–1986) and ambassador to Norway (2002–2005)
  - Gary Piantedosi, 71, Olympic rower (1976)
  - Jane Idleman Smith, 88, scholar
  - John B. Williams, 85, double bassist and bass guitarist (The Tonight Show, The Arsenio Hall Show)
  - Blenda Wilson, 85, academic administrator
  - Jim Wooten, 88, journalist
- June 5
  - Steve Almaas, 69, musician (The Suicide Commandos, Beat Rodeo, The Del-Lords)
  - James Bradley, 72, author (Flags of Our Fathers, Flyboys: A True Story of Courage, The Imperial Cruise)
  - Peter Klopfer, 95, German-born zoologist
  - David Sheiner, 98, actor (A Man Called Gannon, Winning, The Odd Couple),
  - Michael Shur, 83, Soviet-born physicist and academic
- June 6
  - Ernie Cunliffe, 88, Olympic runner (1960)
  - Anthony Guidera, 65, actor (Species, The Godfather Part III, The Rock) and model
  - Alan Hale, 68, astronomer, co-discovered the Comet Hale–Bopp
  - William Hasley, 78, biographer and television writer (Swift Justice, The Smurfs, The Young Riders)
  - John Loring, 86, fashion design director (Tiffany & Co.)
  - Bob Packwood, 93, politician, member of the U.S. Senate (1969–1995)
  - Jane Pegel, 92, sailor
  - Lee Raymond, 87, oil executive, chairman and CEO of ExxonMobil (1987–2005)
  - Robert Louis Wilken, 89, historian
- June 7
  - Rosemary M. Collyer, 80, jurist, judge of the U.S. District Court for D.C. (since 2002), Foreign Intelligence Surveillance Court (2013–2020), and Alien Terrorist Removal Court (2016–2020)
  - Stacey King, 59, basketball player (Chicago Bulls) and broadcaster, three-time NBA champion (1991, 1992, 1993)
  - Dennis Parrett, 66, politician, member of the Kentucky Senate (2011–2023)
  - Lance Rentzel, 82, football player (Dallas Cowboys, Los Angeles Rams, Minnesota Vikings)
  - Robert Ricklefs, 83, ornithologist
  - Wilma Tisch, 98, philanthropist
  - Robert Louis Wilken, 89, historian
  - Gordon S. Wood, 92, historian (The Radicalism of the American Revolution, Empire of Liberty: A History of the Early Republic, 1789–1815), Pulitzer Prize winner (1993)
- June 8
  - Bo Brown, 81, politician, member of the Missouri House of Representatives since 2020
  - Julian Garrett, 85, politician, member of the Iowa Senate (since 2013)
  - Guy Liebmann, 90, politician, mayor of Oklahoma City (2003–2004)
  - Orlando Watters, 54, football player (Seattle Seahawks)
- June 9
  - W. R. Berkley, 80, insurance executive, founder of W. R. Berkley Corporation
  - Gilad Janklowicz, 71, Israeli-born fitness coach (death announced on this date)
  - Duane Michals, 94, photographer
  - Barney Schoby, 87, politician, member of the Mississippi House of Representatives (1980–1997)
  - Janie Sell, 86, singer
  - Bob Simmons, 77, football coach (Oklahoma State Cowboys)
  - Don Stallings, 87, football player (Washington Redskins)
  - Dick Strahm, 92, football coach (Findlay Oilers)
  - Larry Walker, 84, politician, member of the Georgia House of Representatives (1973–2005)
- June 10
  - Dick Barbour, 85, racing driver, motorsport team owner, and businessman
  - Arthur Buikema, 85, biologist and ecologist
  - David Fairrington, 85, painter
  - Wes Gardner, 65, baseball player (New York Mets, Boston Red Sox)
  - Thomas Alan Harris, 92, politician, member of the Tennessee Senate (1966–1968) and House of Representatives (1962–1966)
  - Megan Kimmel, 46, mountain runner
  - John Sanders, 83, sports broadcaster (Pittsburgh Pirates, Cleveland Indians)
  - Chai Vang, 57, convicted murderer
- June 11
  - Merle Boucher, 79, politician, member of the North Dakota House of Representatives (1991–2011)
  - Margaret Kerry, 97, dancer and actress (Peter Pan, If You Knew Susie)
  - Jane Yolen, 87, author (The Devil's Arithmetic, Owl Moon, Commander Toad) and editor
- June 12
  - Al Closter, 82, American baseball player (New York Yankees, Atlanta Braves, Washington Senators).
  - Joseph LaPalombara, 101, political scientist
  - Zack Roach, American guitarist (Senses Fail).
  - Ronnie Schell, 94, American actor (Gomer Pyle – USMC, Good Morning World, Jetsons: The Movie).
  - Gene Shalit, 100, journalist (Ladies' Home Journal), media critic (Look) and television personality (Today)
- June 13
  - John D. Groendyke, 81, trucking executive (Groendyke Transport)
  - Ralph Haben, 84, politician, member (1972–1982) and speaker (1980–1982) of the Florida House of Representatives
  - Betty Lindberg, 101, track and field athlete (Peachtree Road Race)
  - Aldon Smith, 36, football player (San Francisco 49ers, Oakland Raiders)
- June 14
  - Converse Chellis, 82, politician, treasurer (2007–2011) and member of the South Carolina House of Representatives (1996–2006)
  - Stephen Dobyns, 85, poet
  - Craig Fennie, 54, applied physicist
  - Kay Halloran, 89, American politician, member of the Iowa House of Representatives (1997–2001) and mayor of Cedar Rapids, Iowa (2006–2009).
  - Ronell Johnson, 49, trombonist (Preservation Hall Jazz Band)
  - Andy Lewis, 39, American slackliner and stunt performer, BASE jumping accident.
  - Beatrice Lumpkin, 107, union organizer, activist and writer.
  - Anne Schedeen, 77, American actress (ALF, Marcus Welby, M.D., Three's Company).
  - Danny Simmons, 72, abstract expressionist painter.
  - Oliver Tree, 32, singer-songwriter and rapper
- June 15
  - Fred Alexander, drummer (Lakeside)
  - Eddie Andelman, 89, sports radio talk-show host
  - J. Michael Criley, 95, medical researcher
  - Rosalind Gefre, 96, Catholic religious sister
- June 16
  - Daveigh Chase, 35, actress (Lilo & Stitch, The Ring, Donnie Darko)
  - The Duke of Dorchester, 83, professional wrestler (WWWF)
  - Pat Holmes, 85, football player (Houston Oilers, Calgary Stampeders, Kansas City Chiefs)
  - Michael Kapovich, 63, Russian-born mathematician
  - Bobby Prince, 81, video game composer (Doom, Duke Nukem, Wolfenstein 3D)
  - John J. Snow Jr., 80, politician, member of the North Carolina Senate (2005–2011)
  - Robert Thurman, 84, Buddhist writer and academic
  - Al Worthington, 97, baseball player (New York Giants, Boston Red Sox, Minnesota Twins)
- June 17
  - Eliot D. Cohen, 84, electrical engineer
  - Tom Dreesen, 86, comedian and actor (Man on the Moon, Trouble with the Curve, Spaceballs)
  - Toney Lee, 72, singer, songwriter, and record producer
  - Walter Parazaider, 81, Hall of Fame woodwind musician (Chicago)
  - Beau Williams, 76, gospel singer
  - Ralph G. Wright, 91, politician, member (1979–1995) and speaker (1985–1995) of the Vermont House of Representatives
- June 18
  - Elizabeth Arnold, 66, journalist (NPR)
  - Justin Cary, 50, bass guitarist (Sixpence None the Richer)
  - Tay Keith, 29, record producer ("Sicko Mode", "Nonstop", "Look Alive")
  - Mikhail Torrance, 37, basketball player (Alabama Crimson Tide, OGM Ormanspor, Moncton Miracles)
- June 19
  - Gene Bess, 91, college basketball coach (Three Rivers)
  - Kent Briggs, 68, football player and coach (Western Carolina Catamounts)
  - James Burrows, 85, television producer and director (Cheers, Will & Grace, Taxi)
  - Mark Singer, 75, journalist (The New Yorker)
- June 20
  - Geraldene Felton, 100, academic
  - Frank J. Guarini, 101, politician, member of the U.S. House of Representatives (1979–1993)
  - Evalyn Merrick, 72, politician, member of the New Hampshire House of Representatives (2006–2012)
  - Jim Mitchell, 77, football player (Detroit Lions)
- June 21
  - Ange Armato, 96, baseball player (Rockford Peaches, Kalamazoo Lassies)
  - Jim Battle, 88, football player (Edmonton Eskimos, Minnesota Vikings)
  - Louise Holcombe, 72, Olympic slalom canoeist (1972)
  - Jeff Olson, 77, visual effects artist (Star Wars: Episode I – The Phantom Menace, Star Trek, Who Framed Roger Rabbit)
  - Gene Wiley, 88, basketball player (Los Angeles Lakers, Oakland Oaks, Dallas Chaparrals)
- June 22
  - Clive Davis, 94, Hall of Fame music executive (Columbia Records) and record producer, founder of Arista Records and J Records, four-time Grammy winner
  - Joseph F. Fraumeni Jr., 93, medical researcher
  - Joshua Gil, 50, restaurateur
  - Joanne Glasser, 75, academic administrator, president of Eastern Kentucky University (2001–2007) and Bradley University (2007–2015)
  - Alan Greenspan, 100, economist, chair of the Federal Reserve (1987–2006)
  - Eddie Knox, 89, politician, mayor of Charlotte, North Carolina (1979–1983) and member of the North Carolina Senate (1971–1975)
  - Jill Smokler, 48, blogger
  - Bruce Tull, 71, guitarist (Scud Mountain Boys)
  - Dorothy Wilken, 90, politician, mayor of Boca Raton, Florida (1976–1977)
  - Martha Zoller, 66, political commentator and radio host
- June 23
  - Erie Mills, 73, operatic soprano
  - Roger W. Sandler, 92, Major general, chief of the U.S. Army Reserve (1991–1994).
  - Steve Zabel, 78, American football player (Philadelphia Eagles, New England Patriots, Baltimore Colts).
- June 24
  - Ann Blyth, 98, actress (Brute Force, The Great Caruso, Mildred Pierce)
  - Mary-Dell Chilton, 87, biochemist
  - Om Malik, 59, Indian-born web and technology writer, founder of Gigaom
  - Harold Wheeler, 82, orchestrator and composer, as well as musical director for Dancing With the Stars (2005-2014).
- June 25
  - Nicholas Alahverdian, 38, convicted sex offender and fugitive
  - Carl Ekdahl, 90, electrical engineer, fellow of the Institute of Electrical and Electronics Engineers
  - B. J. Sams, 91, news anchor
  - Dusty Spencer, 74, convicted murderer
  - Bill Valentine, 88, architect
  - Frank A. Welch, 65, maritime officer, Master Chief Petty Officer of the Coast Guard (2002–2006)
- June 26
  - Joe Doering, 44, American professional wrestler (TNA, AJPW)
  - Doug Goldstein, 65, band manager (Guns N' Roses) (death announced on this date)
  - Tom Ligon, 85, actor (Paint Your Wagon, The Young and the Restless, Oz)
  - Martha Lillard, 78, polio survivor, last known person reliant on an iron lung
  - Rosetta Miller-Perry, 91, journalist, founder of the Tennessee Tribune
  - John T. Pawlikowski, 85, Roman Catholic priest and theologian
  - Mickey York, 78, racing driver
- June 27
  - David S. Doty, 96, jurist, judge of the U.S. District Court for Minnesota (since 1987)
  - Khadijah Farrakhan, 90, political activist (Nation of Islam)
  - Simon L. Leis Jr., 92, prosecuting attorney and sheriff
  - Margaret Britton Vaughn, 87, poet
- June 28
  - Wilford Lloyd Baumes, 86, screenwriter and television producer (The Love Boat, Wonder Woman)
  - Mignon Dunn, 98, mezzo-soprano and voice teacher
  - Victor Henry Mair, 83, sinologist
- June 29
  - Phyllis Kinney, 103, singer (Carl Rosa Opera Company) and author (death announced on this date)
  - Ervin László, 94, Hungarian-born philosopher
- June 30
  - Roger Cador, 74, Hall of Fame college baseball coach (Southern Jaguars) (death announced on this date)
  - Karen Clark, 80, politician, member of the Minnesota House of Representatives (1981–2019)
  - Victor Willis, 74, singer (Village People) and songwriter ("Y.M.C.A.", "In the Navy")

== July ==
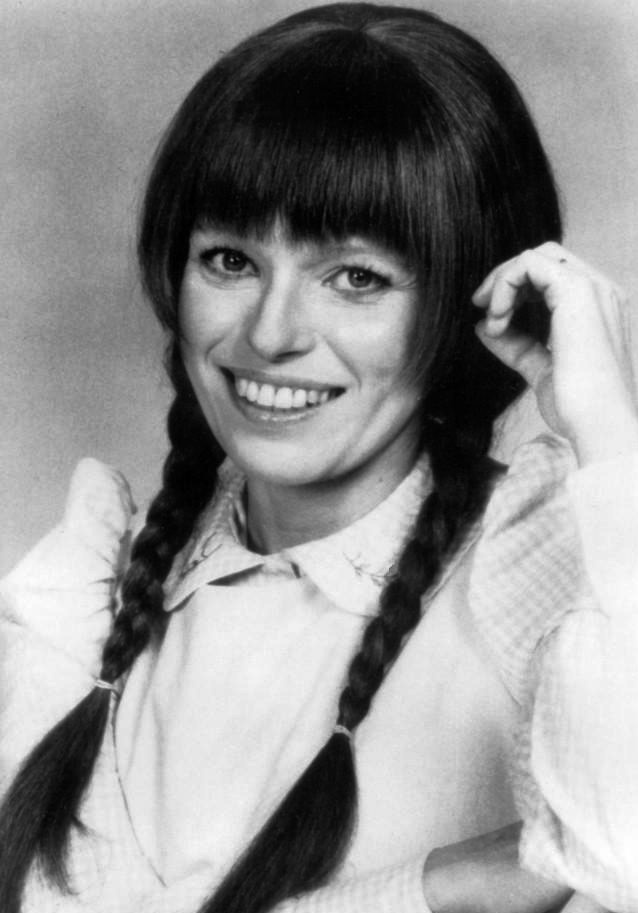
Louise Lasser

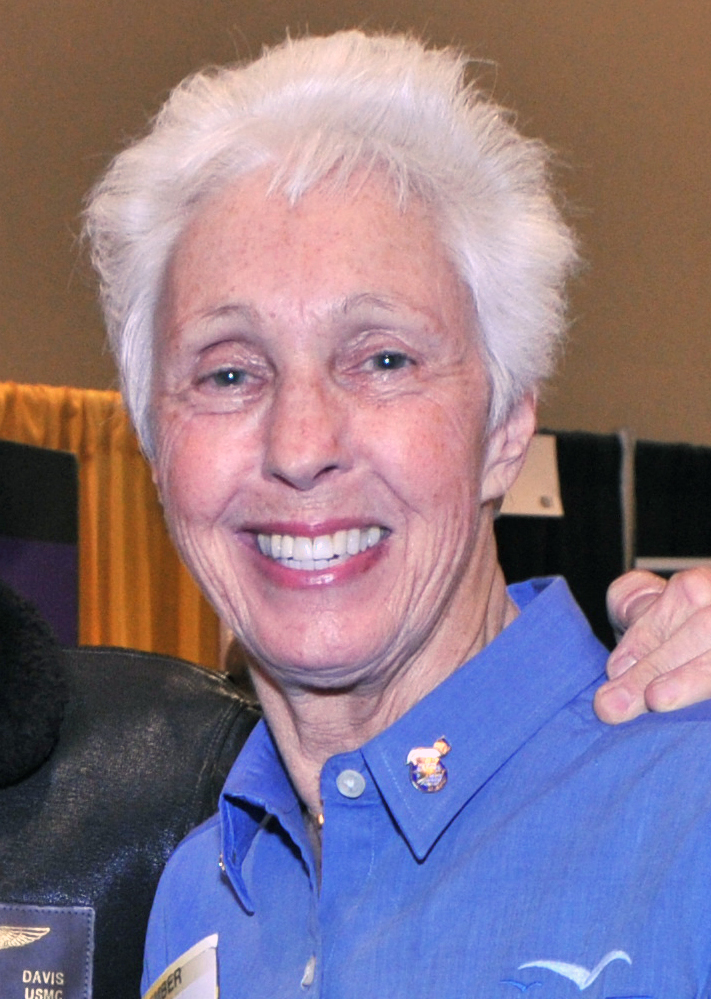
Wally Funk

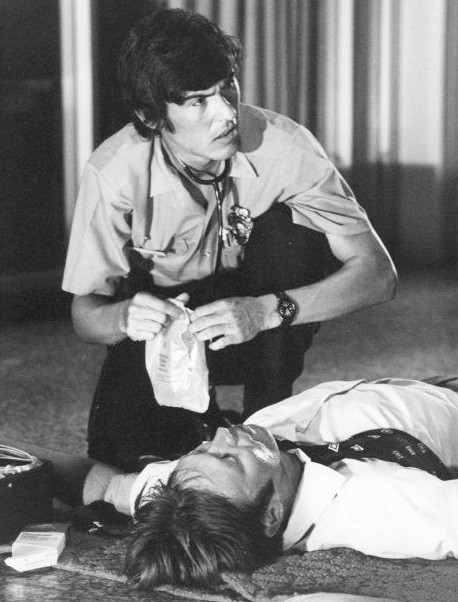
Randolph Mantooth

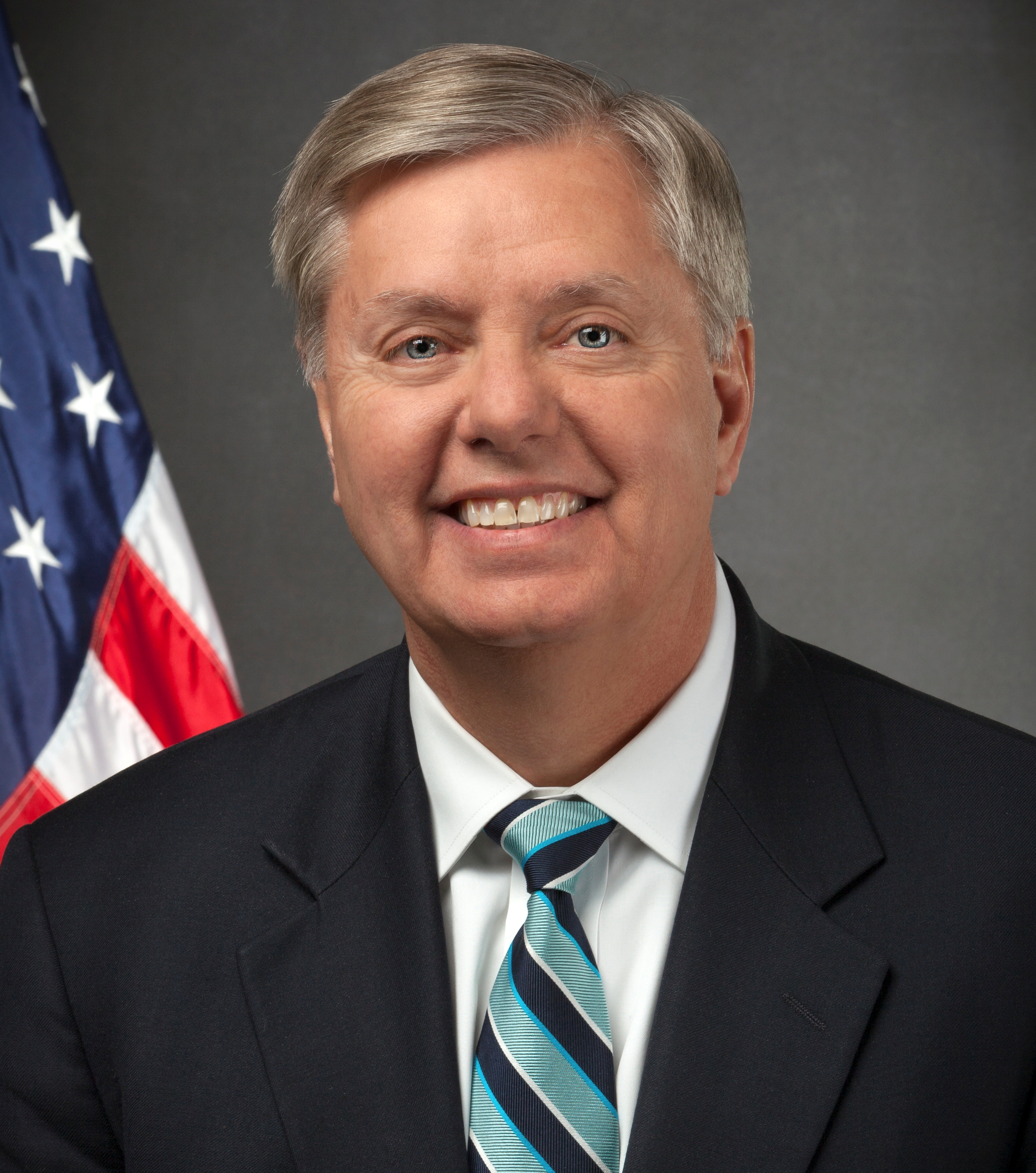
Lindsey Graham

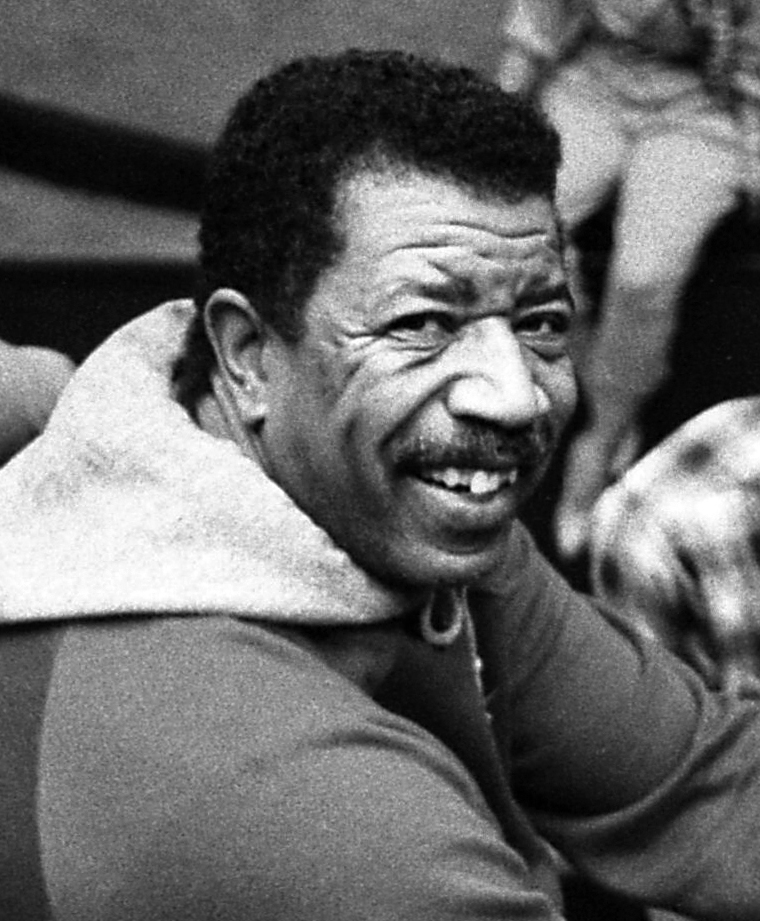
Hal Williams

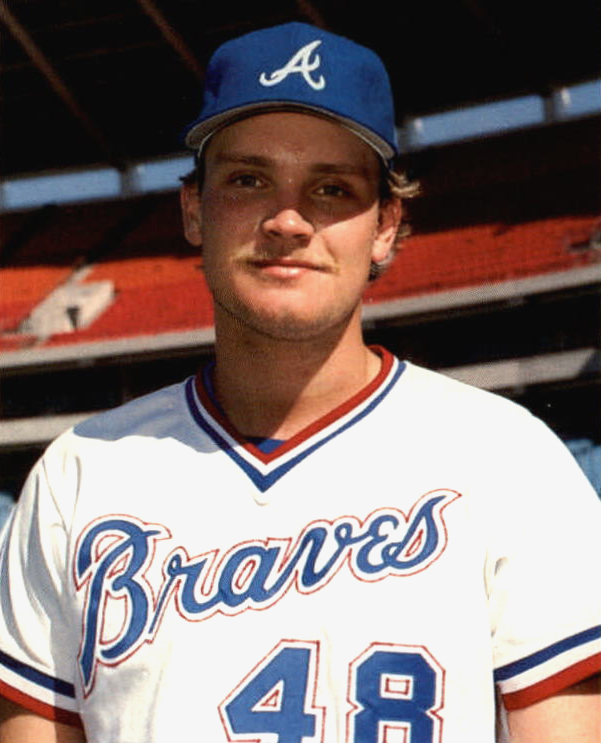
Duane Ward

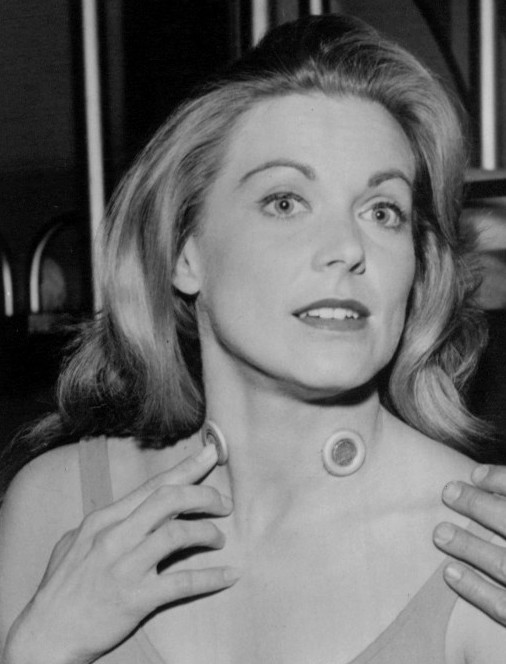
Zale Parry

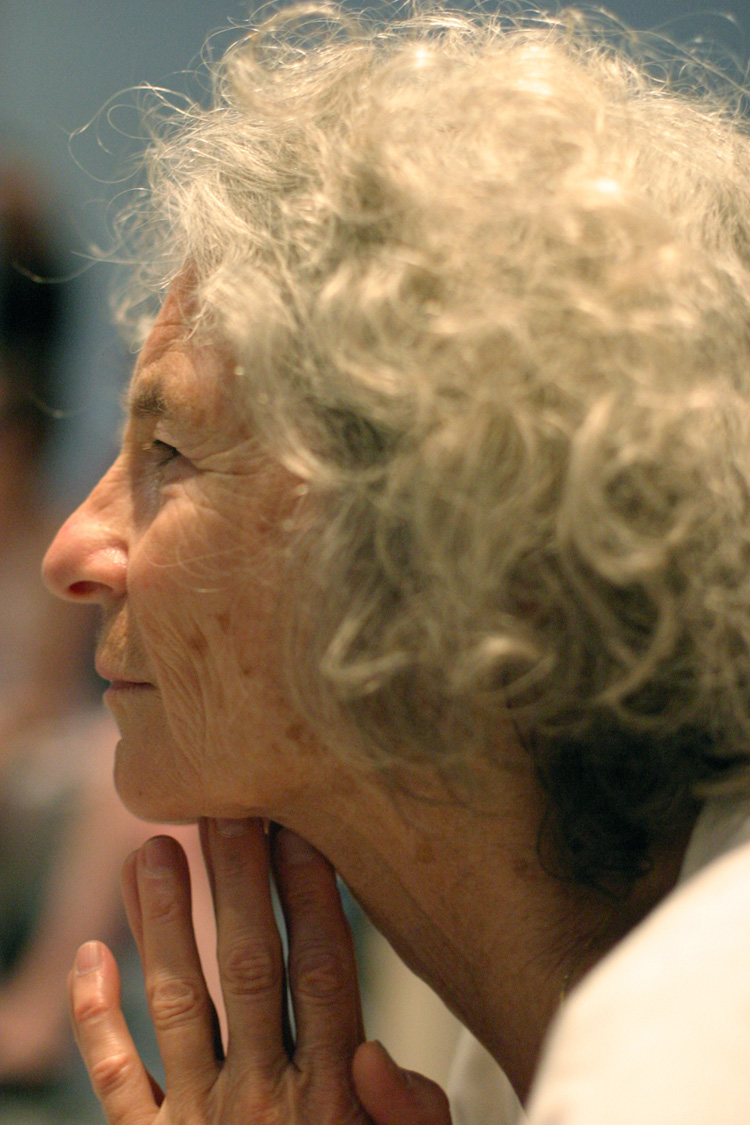
Simone Forti

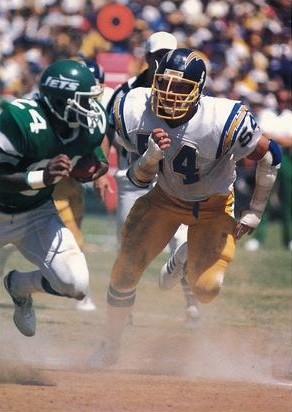
Billy Ray Smith Jr.

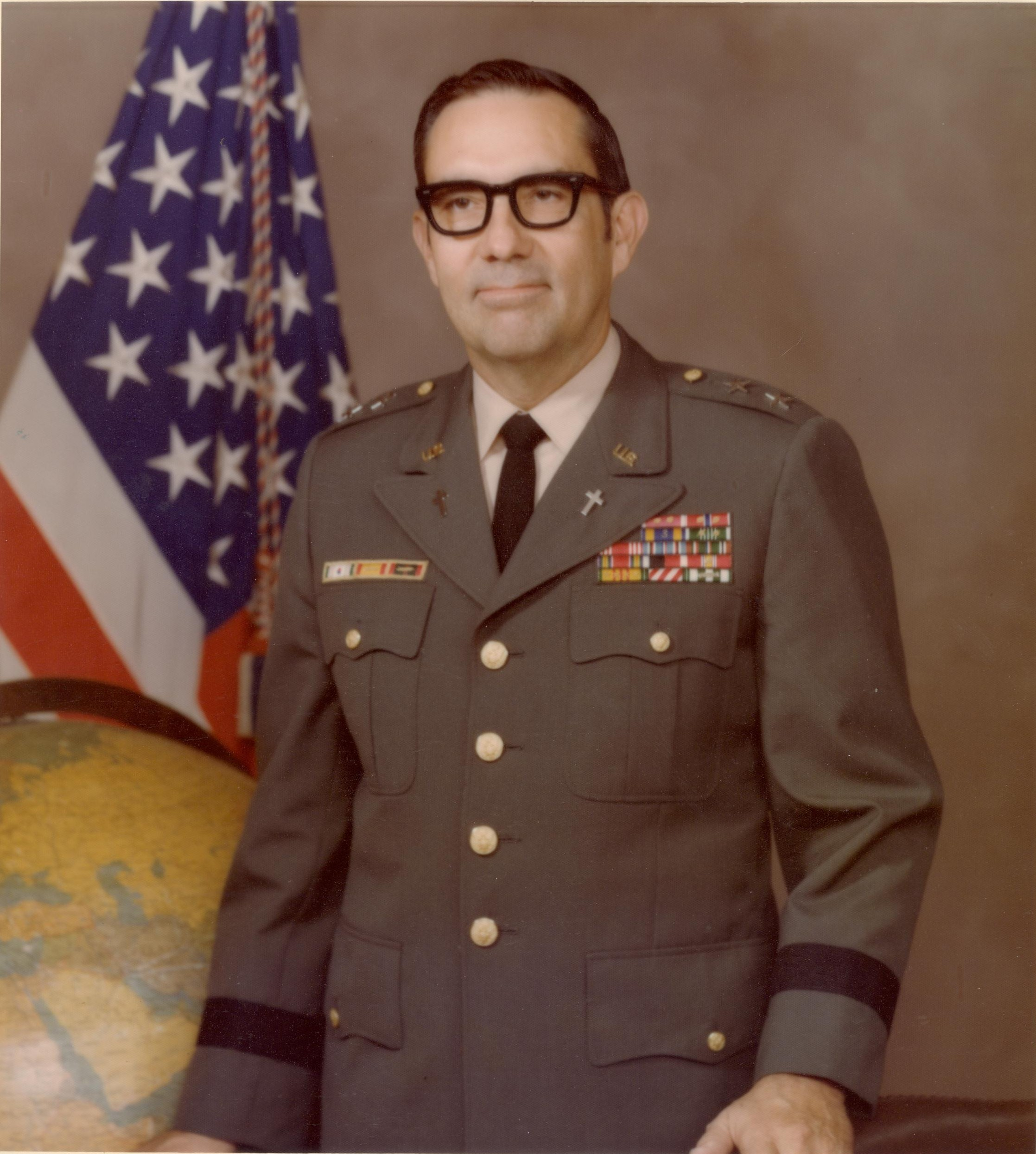
Orris E. Kelly

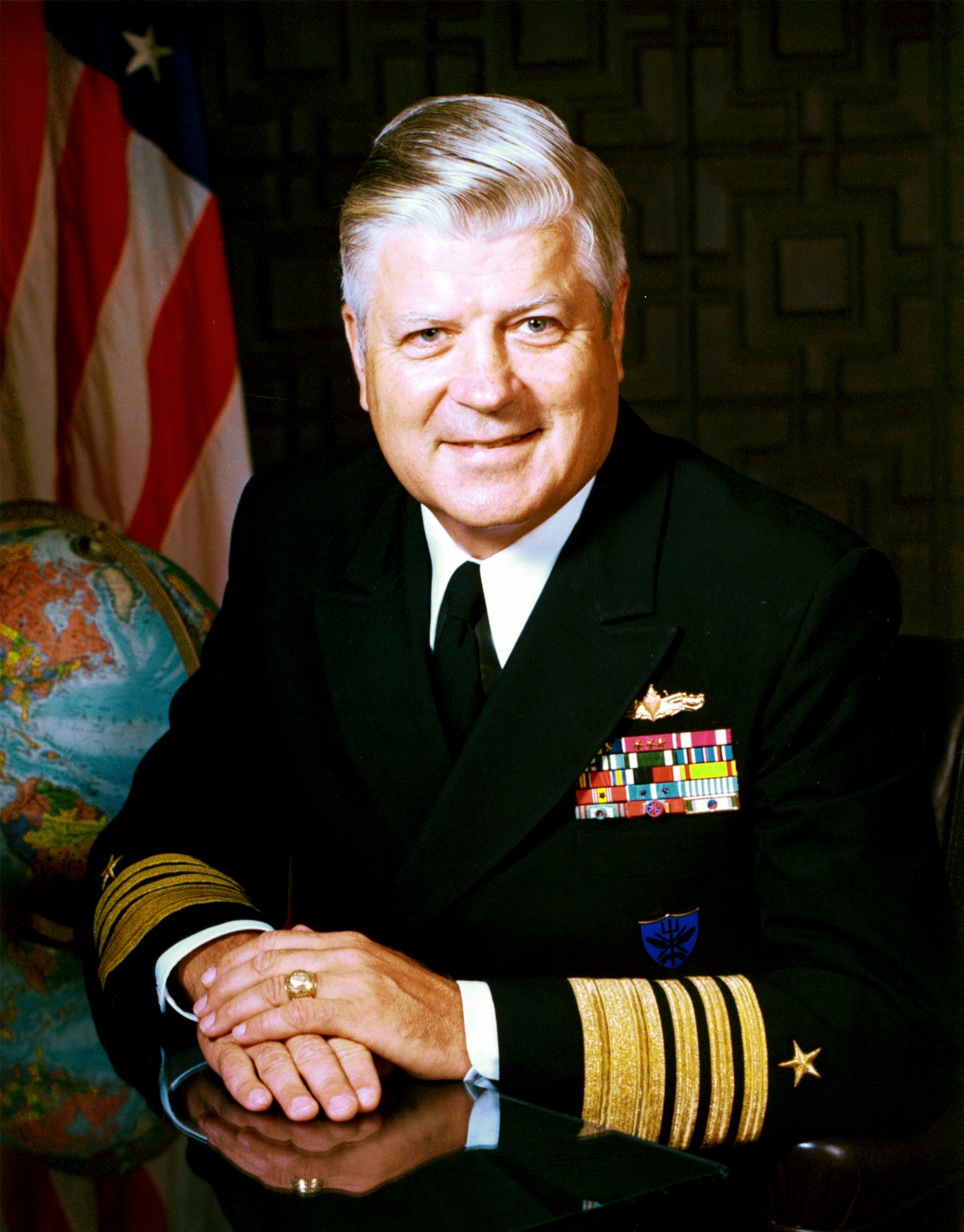
Harry D. Train II

- July 1
  - Moritz Borman, 71, German-born film producer (Terminator Salvation, World Trade Center, Snowden)
  - Kenneth Cox, 97, politician, member of the Ohio House of Representatives (1973–1976) and Senate (1977–1982)
  - Shaun Glass, 57, heavy metal guitarist (Soil, Dirge Within) and bassist (Broken Hope)
  - LeRoy Irvin, 68, football player (Los Angeles Rams, Detroit Lions)
  - Joe Melson, 91, singer and songwriter ("Only the Lonely", "Crying", "Blue Bayou")
  - Anthony M. Trozzolo, 96, chemist
  - Wayne Worcester, 78, journalist
- July 2
  - T. J. Lanning, 41, alpine skier
  - Keith Mitchell, 51, football player (New Orleans Saints, Houston Texans, Jacksonville Jaguars)
  - Jim Walden, 88, college football coach (Washington State Cougars, Iowa State Cyclones)
- July 3
  - Gail Clark, 75, football player (Chicago Bears, New England Patriots)
  - Carter DeHaven, 94, film producer (Hoosiers, Dead Heat on a Merry-Go-Round, The Exorcist III)
  - Bruno Lucchesi, 99, Italian-born sculptor
  - John Parisella, 81, horse trainer
  - Bobbi Queen, 84, fashion editor
  - Robert B. Sloan, 77, academic and theologian, president of Houston Christian University (since 2006)
- July 4
  - Leonard Abramson, 93, managed care founder and executive (U.S. Healthcare)
  - Bill Archer, 98, politician, member of the U.S. House of Representatives (1971–2001) and the Texas House of Representatives (1967–1971)
  - Al Holland, 73, baseball player (San Francisco Giants, Philadelphia Phillies, New York Yankees)
  - Ed King, 89, minister and civil rights activist
  - Shirley Kitchen, 79, politician, member of the Pennsylvania House of Representatives (1987–1988) and Senate (1996–2006)
  - Sparky D, 61, rapper (Roxanne Wars)
  - Rya W. Zobel, 94, German-born jurist, judge of the U.S. District Court of Massachusetts (since 1979)
- July 5
  - George Benedek, 97, physicist
  - Johnny Ginger, 92, television presenter
  - Dick Himes, 80, football player (Green Bay Packers)
  - Darrell Jackson, 70, baseball player (Minnesota Twins)
  - Walt Odets, 79, psychologist and author
  - Mike Wallace, 83, historian and author (Greater Gotham)
- July 6
  - Herman Chernoff, 103, mathematician
  - Kevin Chown, 56, bass guitarist (Chad Smith's Bombastic Meatbats, Artension, Tarja Turunen)
  - John Van Antwerp Fine Jr., 86, historian
  - George E. Johnson, 99, hair and cosmetics executive, founder of the Johnson Products Company
  - Louise Lasser, 87, actress (Mary Hartman, Mary Hartman, Bananas, Happiness)
  - Saverio "Sonny" Morea, 94, aerospace engineer and project manager (F-1, J-2, Lunar Roving Vehicle)
  - David Emil Mungello, 82, historian
  - Paul Wheatbread, 80, drummer (Gary Puckett & The Union Gap)
- July 7
  - Rhett Bernstein, 38, soccer player (Sevilla FC Puerto Rico, Mjøndalen IF, Miami FC)
  - Paul Farrow, 61, politician, member of the Wisconsin State Senate (2012–2015) and Assembly (2010–2012)
  - Jamil Merrell, 36, football player (Rutgers Scarlet Knights, Chicago Bears, Los Angeles KISS)
  - Frank Ribaudo, 81, businessman, founder of Club Café
  - Alan Sader, 85, actor (Evan Almighty, Lincoln, The Prince of Tides)
  - Larry Selders, 44, politician, member of the Louisiana Senate (since 2025) and House of Representatives (2021–2025)
  - William D. Zabel, 89, lawyer
- July 8
  - Ben Arredondo, 79, politician, member of the Arizona House of Representatives (2011–2012)
  - Rodney Franklin, 67, jazz pianist and composer ("The Groove")
  - Wally Funk, 87, aviator and commercial astronaut
  - Greg Hawthorne, 69, football player (Pittsburgh Steelers, New England Patriots, Indianapolis Colts), Super Bowl champion (1980)
  - Harris Katleman, 97, television producer (Salvage 1, The Don Rickles Show, From Here to Eternity)
  - Jack Latvala, 74, politician, member of the Florida Senate (1994–2002, 2010–2018)
  - Henry O. Pollak, 98, Austrian-born mathematician (Graham–Pollak theorem, Gilbert–Pollak conjecture)
  - Phil Regan, 89, baseball player (Los Angeles Dodgers, Chicago Cubs) and manager (Baltimore Orioles)
  - John Ruf, 58, sailor, Paralympic bronze medalist (2008)
- July 9
  - Gil Blanco, 80, baseball player (New York Yankees, Kansas City Athletics)
  - Robert E. Cohen, 79, chemical engineer
  - Clara Ester, 78, United Methodist minister and civil rights activist (Assassination of Martin Luther King Jr.)
  - Don Iwerks, 96, entertainment executive (Disney, SimEx-Iwerks)
  - Barbara Ling, 73, production designer (Once Upon a Time in Hollywood, Michael, Batman Forever), Oscar winner (2020)
  - Randolph Mantooth, 80, actor (Emergency!, Loving, The City)
  - Kathy Muehlemann, 76, painter
  - Lillian Roberts, 98, union leader
  - Peter Van Norden, 75, actor (The Naked Gun 2½: The Smell of Fear, The Accused, The Stand)
- July 10
  - Josh Grisetti, 44, actor (It Shoulda Been You, Camelot, The Marvelous Mrs. Maisel)
  - Ralph Hemecker, 65, television director (Blue Bloods, Once Upon a Time, The Flash)
  - Kinu Rochford, 35, basketball player (Cheshire Phoenix, Plymouth Raiders, Þór Þorlákshöfn), shot
  - Doug Stahl, 63, professional wrestler
  - Mark B. Wise, 72, Canadian-born theoretical physicist
- July 11
  - Robert W. Cole, 95, conductor
  - Yahiya Emerick, 55, author and scholar
  - Bob Farrell, 77, Christian musician and songwriter (Farrell and Farrell)
  - Leon Fuller, 87, football coach (Texas Longhorns, Colorado State Rams)
  - Lindsey Graham, 71, politician, member of the U.S. Senate (since 2003) and House of Representatives (1995–2003)
  - Gunter Stein, 84, electrical engineer
- July 12
  - Scott Bryce, 68, actor (As the World Turns, Visions of Murder, Murphy Brown)
  - Kent Carpenter, 73, marine biologist
  - Mary Morello, 102, activist, founder of Parents for Rock and Rap
  - Mary Otis Stevens, 98, architect
  - Vernon Taylor, 88, rockabilly singer
- July 13
  - Mike Browning, 62, musician (Morbid Angel, Nocturnus)
  - Joe Caldwell, 97, television writer (Dark Shadows, NBC Matinee Theater, The Secret Storm)
  - Jameson Currier, 70, writer
  - Fred Dudley, 81, politician, member of the Florida Senate (1986–1998)
  - Charlie King, 83, football player (Buffalo Bills, Cincinnati Bengals)
  - Dudley Laufman, 95, contra dance caller and musician
  - Harry Swinney, 87, physicist
- July 14
  - Rodney Holmes, 59, drummer (Santana)
  - Janice McNair, 89, football executive (Houston Texans)
  - John E. Steele, 77, jurist, judge of the U.S. District Court for the Middle District of Florida (since 2000)
  - Guy Tudor, 91, ornithologist, bird illustrator and conservationist
  - Lee Underwood, 87–88, musician and journalist
  - William Wisher Jr., 71, screenwriter (Terminator 2: Judgment Day, Judge Dredd, Exorcist: The Beginning)
- July 15
  - John Esposito, 86, academic and writer (Islam: The Straight Path)
  - Ron Hunt, 85, baseball player (New York Mets, San Francisco Giants, Montreal Expos)
  - Plas Johnson, 94, soul-jazz saxophonist
  - John Kirby, 75, actor (Nutcracker: Money, Madness and Murder) and coach (Jim Caviezel)
  - Denise Oliver-Velez, 78, activist and community organizer
  - Randolph Thummel, 80, chemist
  - Hal Williams, 91, actor (227, Sanford and Son, Private Benjamin)
- July 16
  - Lattie F. Coor, 89, university administrator, president of the University of Vermont (1976–1989) and Arizona State University (1990–2002)
  - Rudolph A. Marcus, 102, Canadian-born chemist, Nobel Prize laureate (1992)
  - Chiang C. Mei, 91, physicist
  - Norman Ravitch, 89, historian
  - Alan Walden, 83, music manager (Lynyrd Skynyrd, Otis Redding), founder of Capricorn Records
- July 17
  - Melvin R. Brown, 88, politician, member of the Utah House of Representatives (2007–2017)
  - Freddy Cannon, 89, singer ("Tallahassee Lassie", "Palisades Park")
  - Richard J. Estes, 84, academic
  - William Gehrlein, 80, academic and researcher
- July 18
  - Jennifer Finch, 59, musician (L7), songwriter ("Everglade") and photographer
  - Jim Gilstrap, 79, soul singer ("Swing Your Daddy")
  - Tim Murphy, 73, politician, member of the U.S. House of Representatives (2003–2017) and Pennsylvania Senate (1996–2003)
  - Clint Reilly, 79, real estate investor and newspaper publisher (San Francisco Examiner)
  - Denny Sanford, 90, banker and philanthropist, founder of First Premier Bank
  - Duane Ward, 62, baseball player (Toronto Blue Jays, Atlanta Braves), World Series champion (1992, 1993)
- July 19
  - John Droney, 79, politician
  - Patrick Gleeson, 91, composer and musician
  - Sidney H. Griffith, 87–88, academic (Catholic University of America)
  - Richard Heinberg, 75, journalist and ecologist
  - Peter Lassally, 93, German-born television producer (The Tonight Show)
  - Jim Lindsey, 81, football player (Minnesota Vikings)
  - Dale Steele, 70, college football coach (Campbell Fighting Camels)
- July 20
  - Charlie Brueckman, 90, football player (Washington Redskins, Los Angeles Chargers)
  - John C. Dvorak, 80, tech writer and broadcaster
  - Carl Kunasek, 94, politician, member of the Arizona House of Representatives (1973–1983), member (1983–1989) and president (1987–1989) of the Arizona Senate
  - Zale Parry, 93, scuba diver and actress (Kingdom of the Sea, Sea Hunt, Tillamook Treasure)
  - John A. Polk, 77, politician, member of the Mississippi State Senate (2012–2026)
- July 21
  - Scott Brown, 69, baseball player (Cincinnati Reds)
  - Mitch Byrd, 63, comic book artist (Green Lantern: Mosaic, The Hero System Bestiary)
  - Jordan Devey, 38, football player (New England Patriots, Kansas City Chiefs)
  - Charles Gaines, 84, writer (Pumping Iron), co-inventor of paintball
  - Kaylee Hottle, 18, actress (Godzilla vs. Kong, Godzilla x Kong: The New Empire)
  - Bill McGlaughlin, 82, composer and radio host (Exploring Music, Saint Paul Sunday)
  - Anne Russell, 103, actress (Hello, Dolly!, Mame)
  - Ruby Kless Sondock, 100, judge, associate justice of the Supreme Court of Texas (1982)
  - James Woolsey, 84, lawyer, U.S. under secretary of the Navy (1977–1979) and director of central intelligence (1993–1995)
- July 22
  - Gordon G. Gallup, 85, psychologist
  - Chris Murphy, 58, politician, member of the South Carolina House of Representatives (2011–2026)
  - Barbara L. Nichols, 87, nurse and administrator, president of the American Nurses Association (1978–1982)
  - Chuck Russell, 74, film director (The Mask, A Nightmare on Elm Street 3: Dream Warriors, The Scorpion King), producer and screenwriter
- July 23
  - Hope Clarke, 85, actress (A Piece of the Action, Seventeen Again, Rustin)
  - Jean-Pierre Dorléac, 83, French-born costume designer (Battlestar Galactica, The Blue Lagoon, Somewhere in Time)
  - Charles R. Hamm, 92, Air Force general, superintendent of the Air Force Academy (1987–1991)
  - Clemente Marconi, 60, Italian-born archaeologist and art historian
  - Nicholas Platt, 90, diplomat, ambassador to Pakistan (1991–1992), the Philippines (1987–1991), and Zambia (1982–1984)
  - Paul Sanasardo, 97, dancer and choreographer
- July 24
  - Bert Askson, 80, football player (Green Bay Packers)
  - Richard Brickhouse, 87, racing driver (NASCAR), Talladega 500 winner (1969)
  - Jackie Cline, 66, football player (Miami Dolphins, Pittsburgh Steelers, Detroit Lions)
  - Lou Koller, 59, punk rock singer (Sick of It All)
  - Loren Nerell, 65, composer (death announced on this date)
  - Mary de Rachewiltz, 101, Italian-born writer (Discretions) and poet
- July 25
  - Richard Lerblance, 80, politician, member of the Oklahoma House of Representatives (2002–2003) and Senate (2003–2012)
  - Thomas W. Luce III, 86, government official
  - Albert Sorensen, 94, politician, member of the Iowa Senate (1991–1997)
- July 26
  - John Anderson, 71, baseball player and coach (Minnesota Golden Gophers)
  - Gilberto Cárdenas, 79, sociologist and art collector
  - Joel Cohen, 84, musician
  - Thomas Hines, 89, American architectural historian
  - George Israel, 78, politician, mayor of Macon, Georgia (1979–1987)
  - Jerry Lamb, 85, Episcopal prelate, bishop of Northern California (1992–2006)
  - Betye Saar, 99, artist
  - Esther Tomljanovich, 94, judge, justice of the Minnesota Supreme Court (1990–1998)
  - Frank Tusa, 79, bassist and composer
- July 27
  - Jerry Hopkins, 85, football player (Denver Broncos, Miami Dolphins, Oakland Raiders)
- July 28
  - Geraldine Bey, 91, jazz singer and concert organizer (Chicago Jazz Festival)
  - Fred Doucette, 61, politician, member of the New Hampshire House of Representatives (2014–2025)
  - James Aren Duckett, 68, convicted child murderer and sex offender
  - G. Thomas Goodnight, 77, scholar and communication theorist
  - Bobby Hunt, 85, football player (Kansas City Chiefs, Cincinnati Bengals) (death announced on this date)
  - Joe Novak, 81, college football player and coach (Northern Illinois Huskies)
  - Dominick Occhicone, 80, convicted murderer
  - Andrea Phipps, 82, stable owner (Phipps Stable) and horse breeder (Golden Tempo)
  - Benjamin Alire Sáenz, 71, author (Aristotle and Dante Discover the Secrets of the Universe)
  - Richard Yuille, 79, judge
- July 29
  - Simone Forti, 91, postmodern dancer, choreographer and artist
  - Harry Mitchell, 86, politician, member of the U.S. House of Representatives (2007–2011)
  - Carol Lynn Pearson, 86, poet, author and screenwriter (Cipher in the Snow)
  - Arlene Smith, 84, singer (The Chantels)
  - Billy Ray Smith Jr., 64, Hall of Fame football player (Arkansas Razorbacks, San Diego Chargers)
- July 30
  - Johanna Fernández, 55, historian
- July 31
  - Jakob Butturff, 32, ten-pin bowler
  - Jeff Conolly, 69, rock musician (Lyres, DMZ)
  - Orris E. Kelly, 100, army officer, chief of chaplains (1975–1979)
  - Harry D. Train II, 98, admiral, commander-in-chief of the U.S. Sixth Fleet (1976–1978) and the U.S. Atlantic Fleet (1978–1982)

== August ==
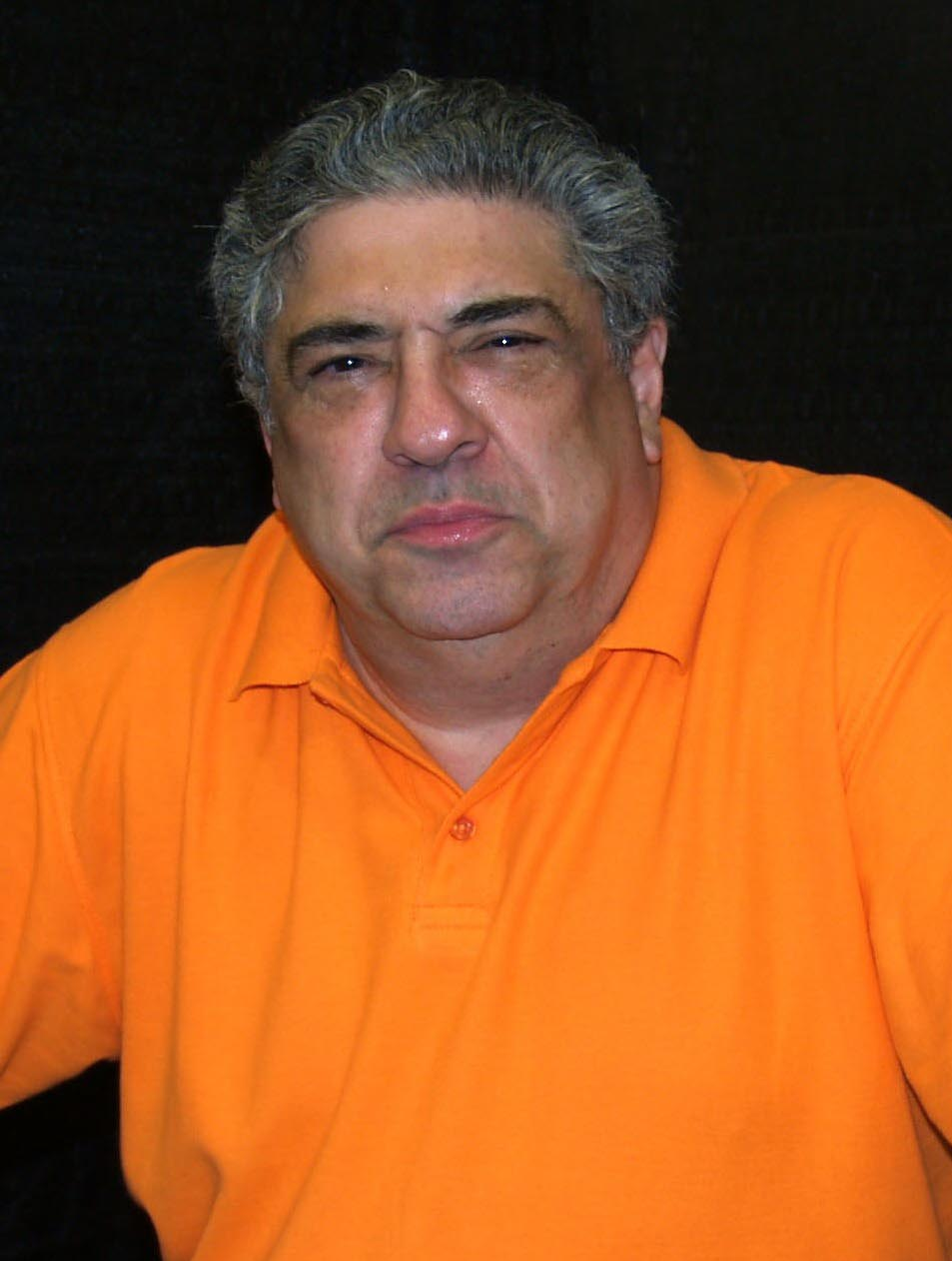
Vincent Pastore

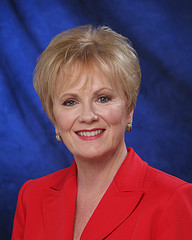
Kay Granger

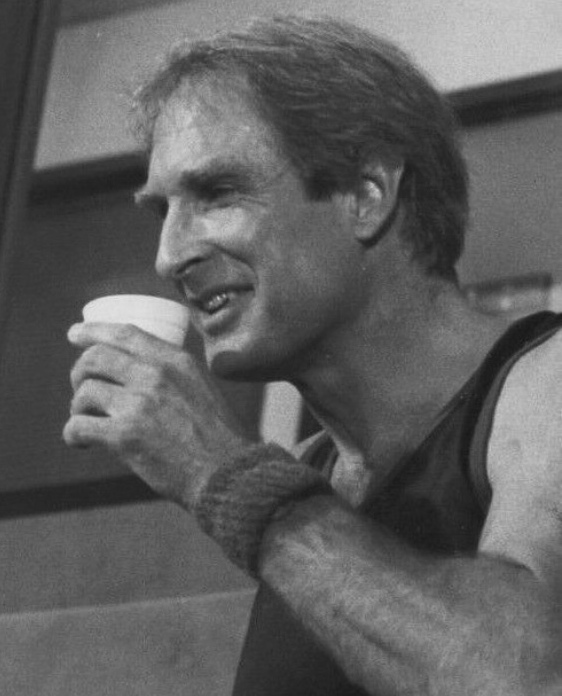
Jon Cypher

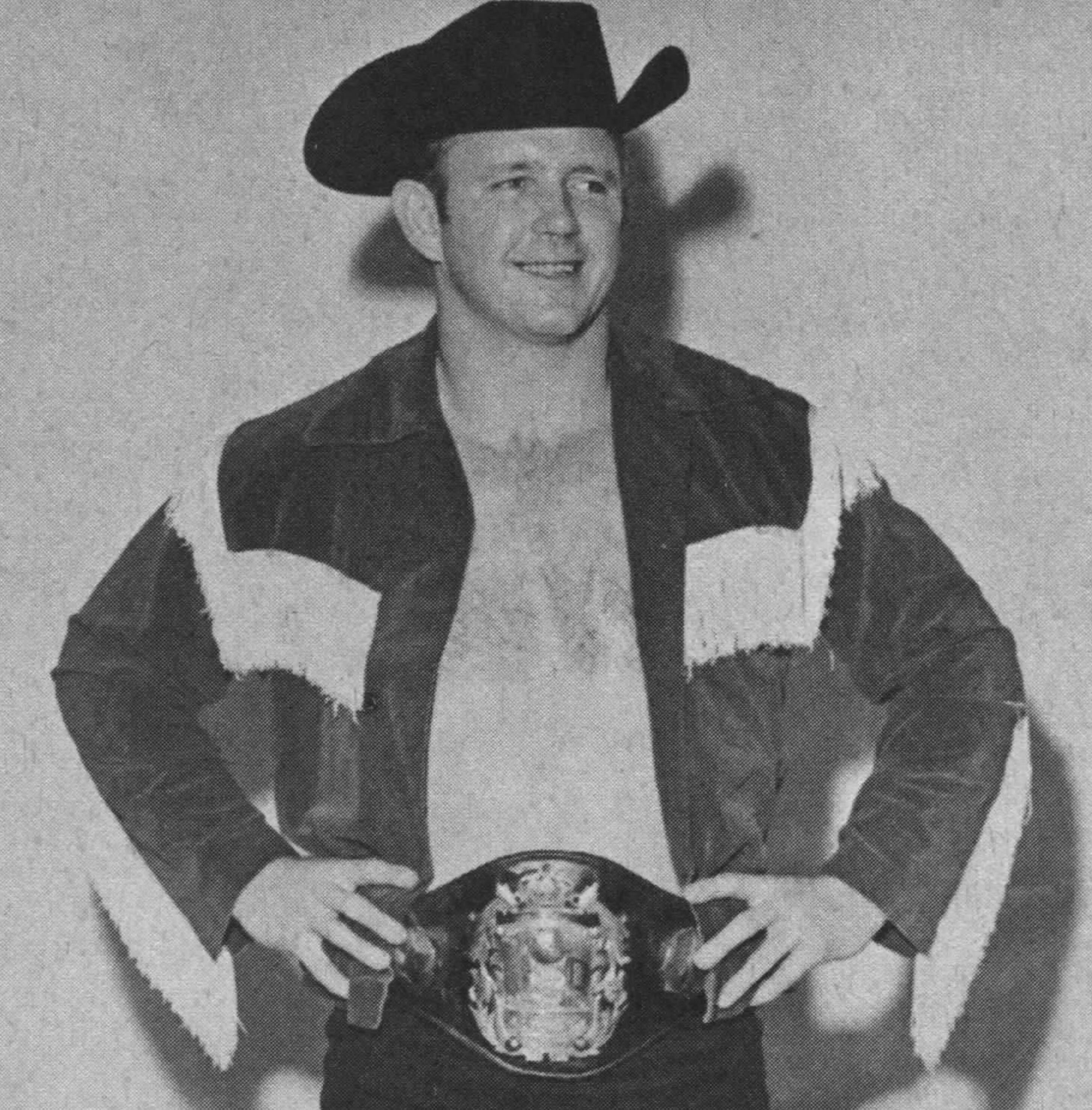
Dory Funk Jr.

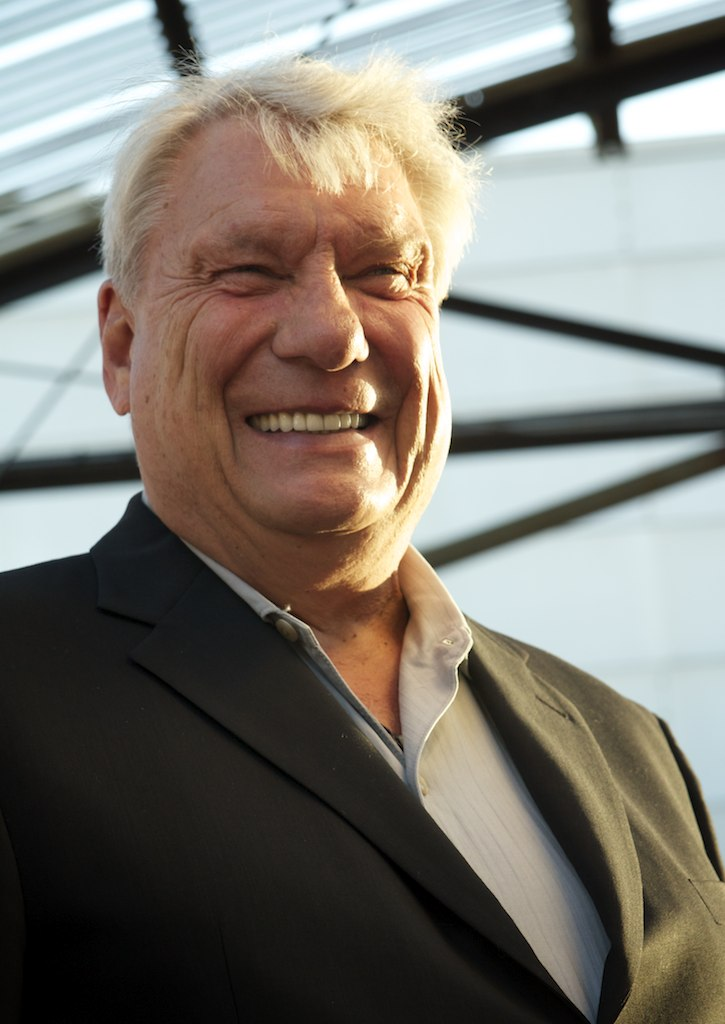
Don Nelson

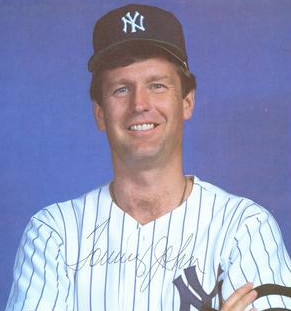
Tommy John

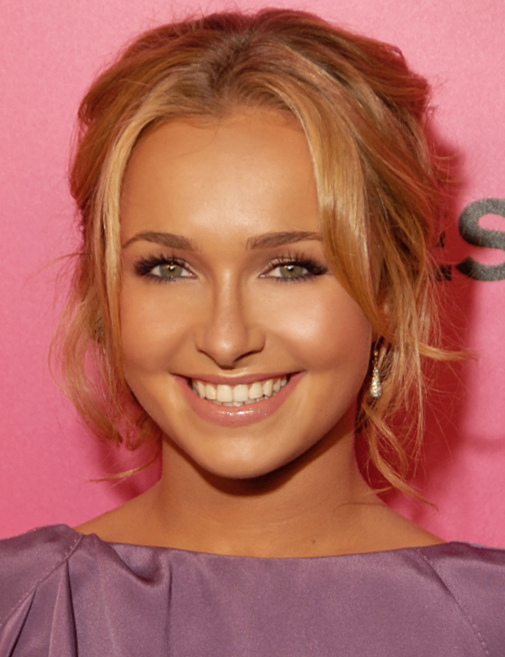
Hayden Panettiere

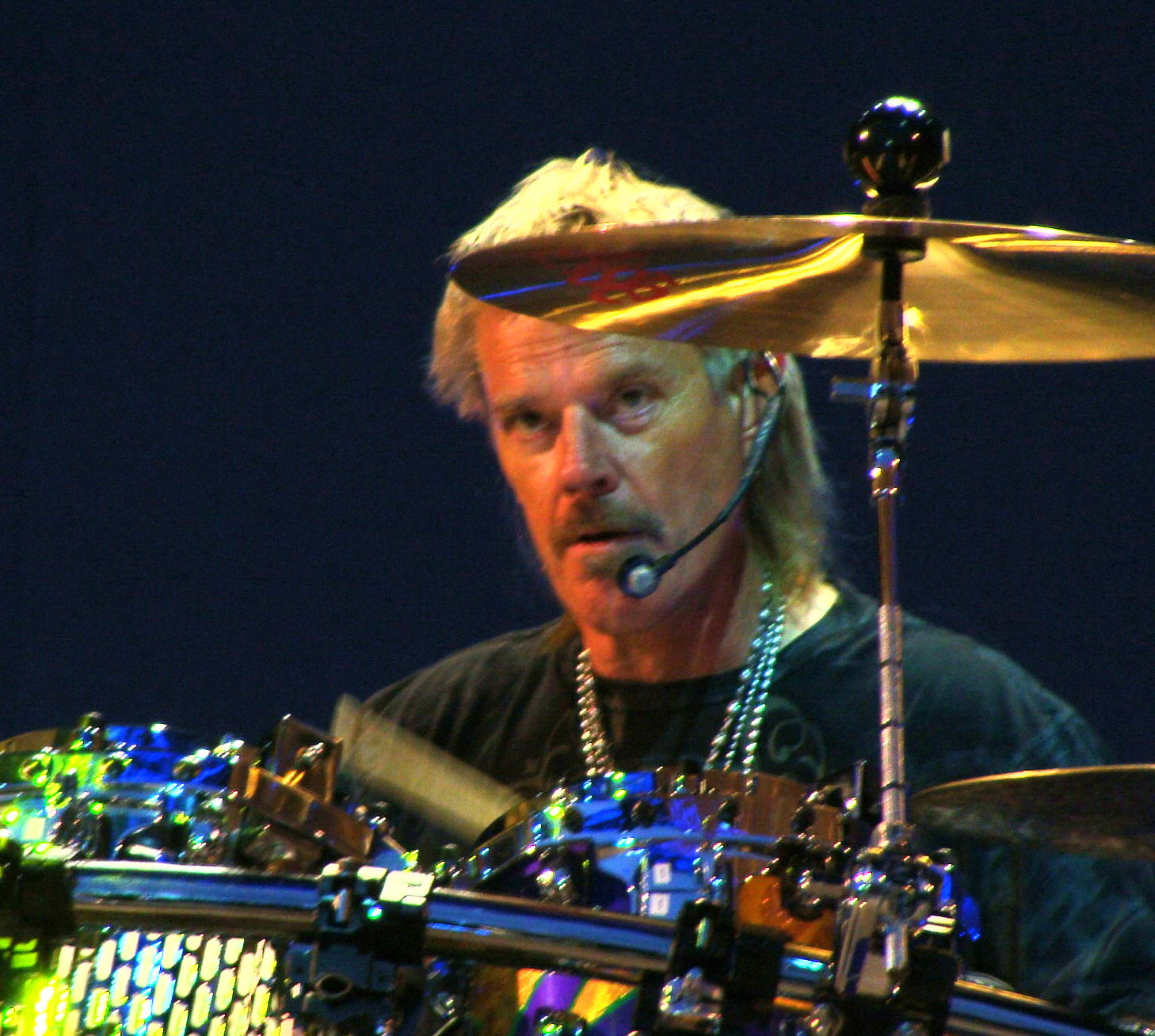
Frank Beard

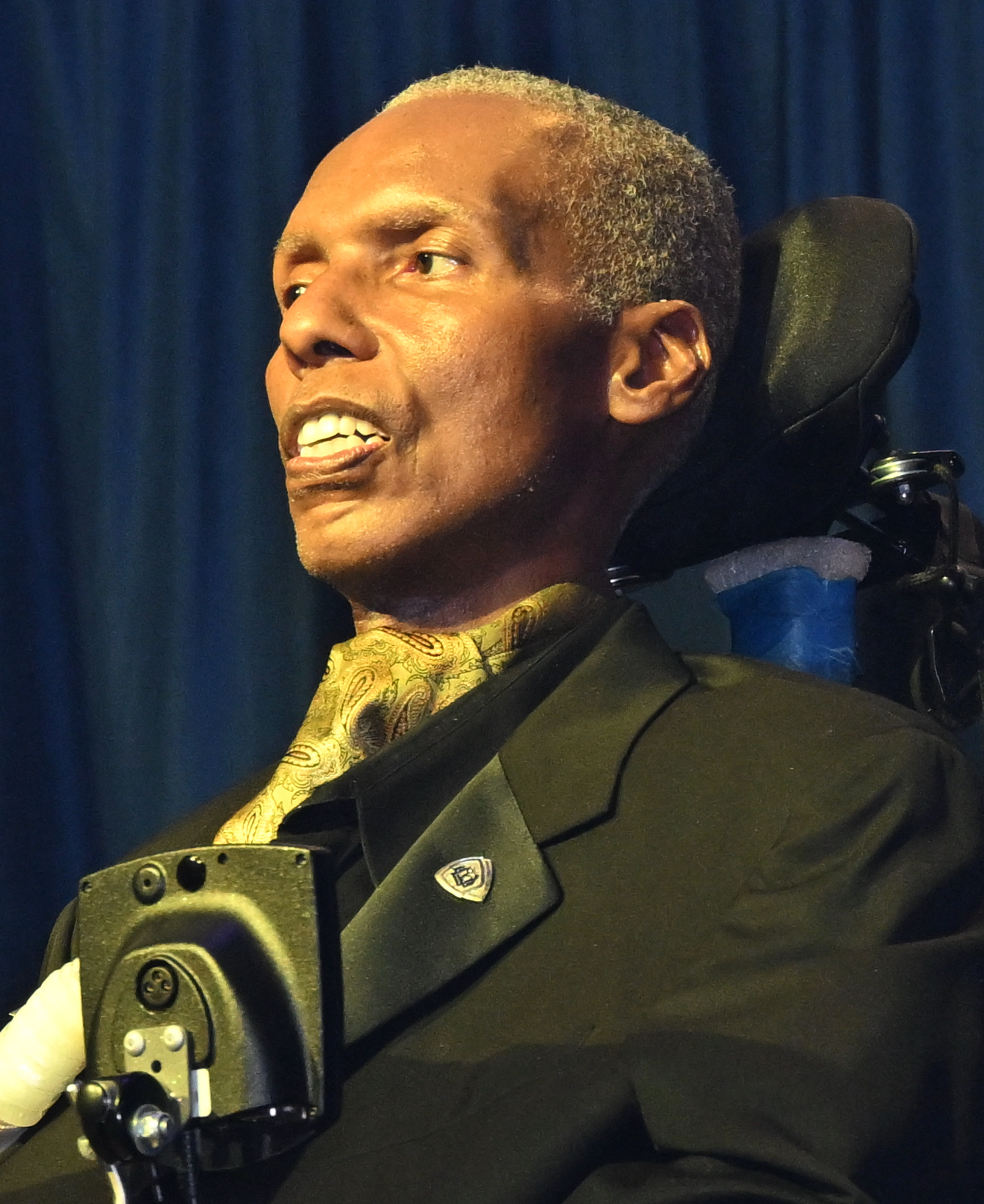
O. J. Brigance

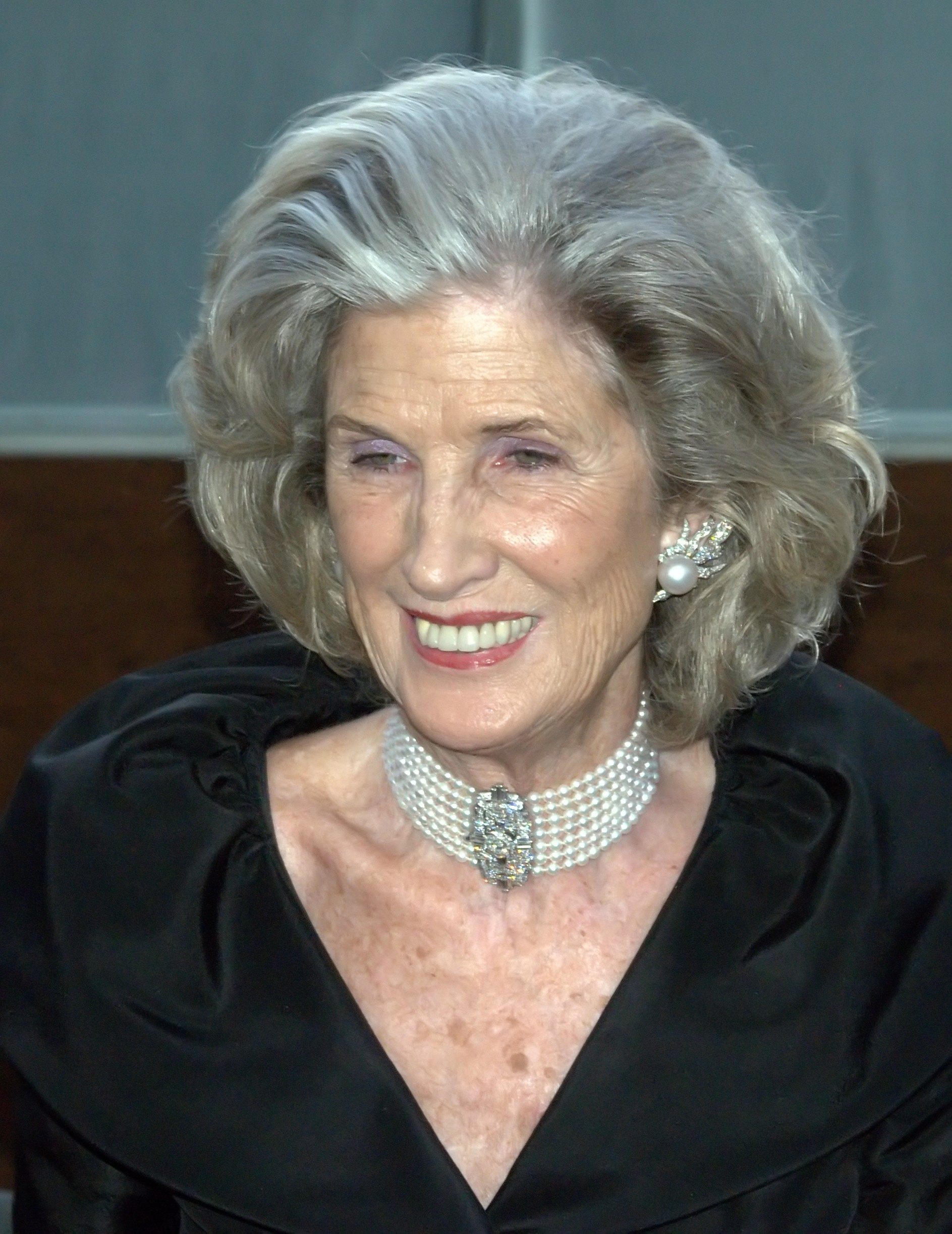
Nancy Kissinger

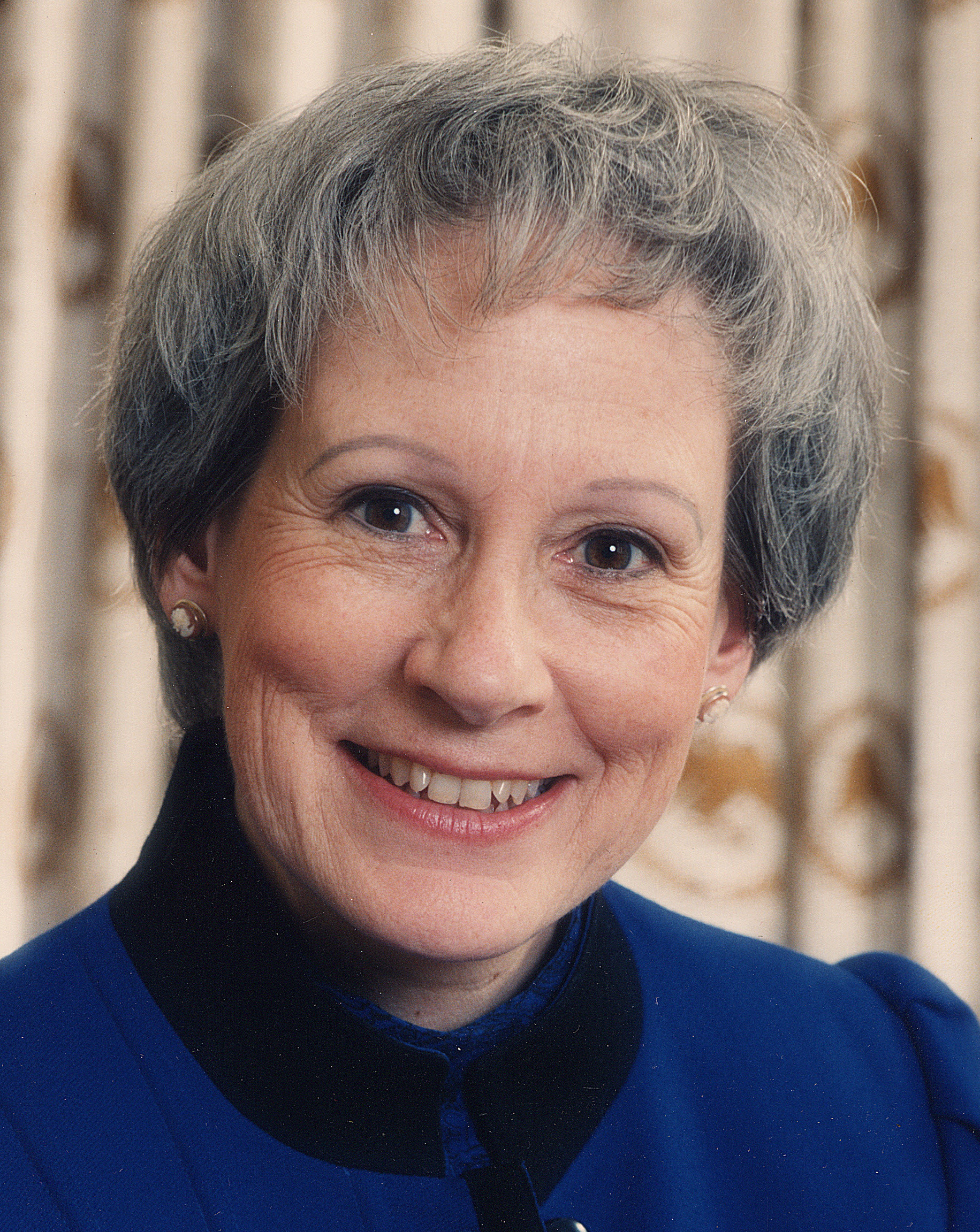
Nancy Kassebaum

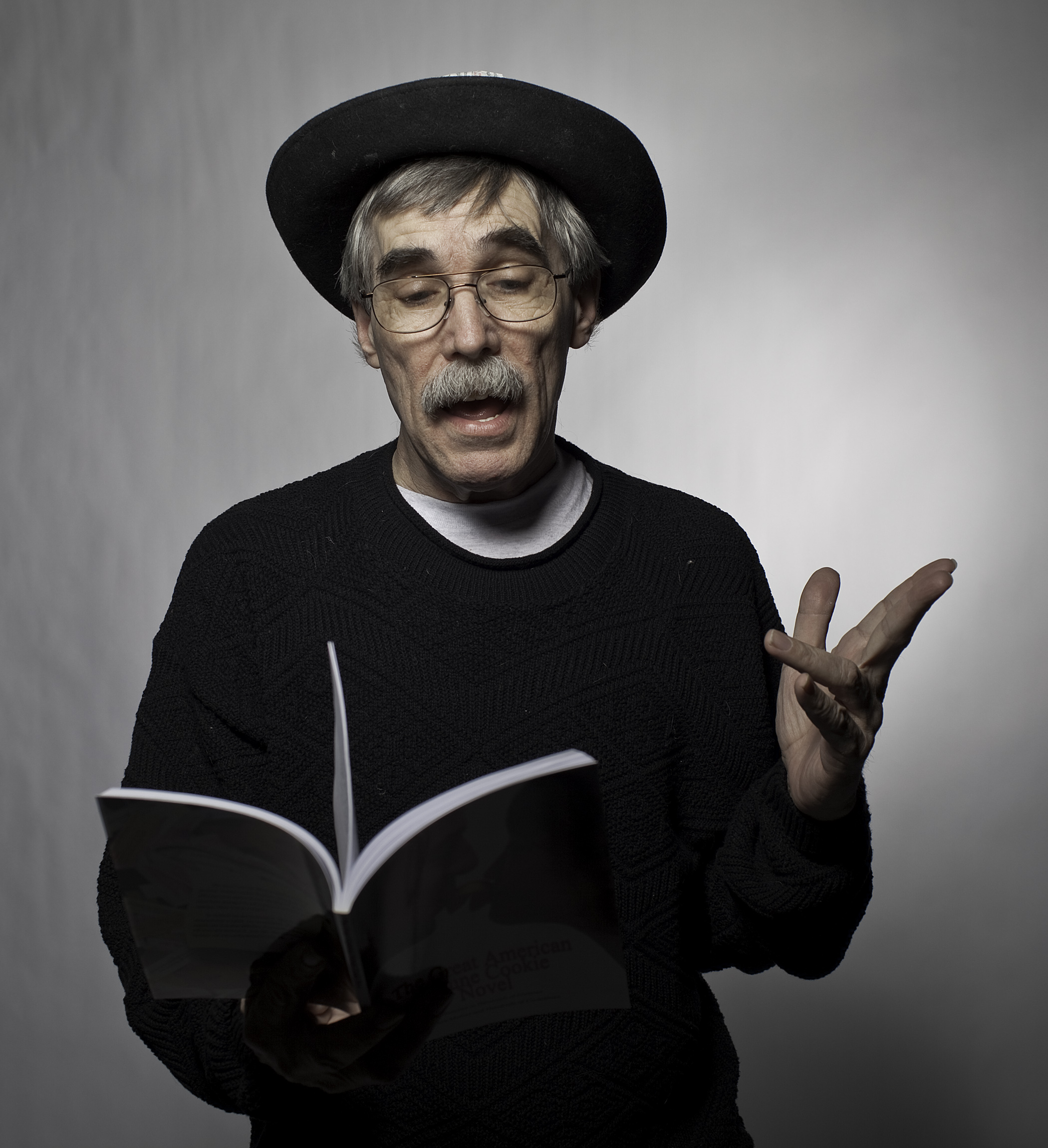
Dave Morice

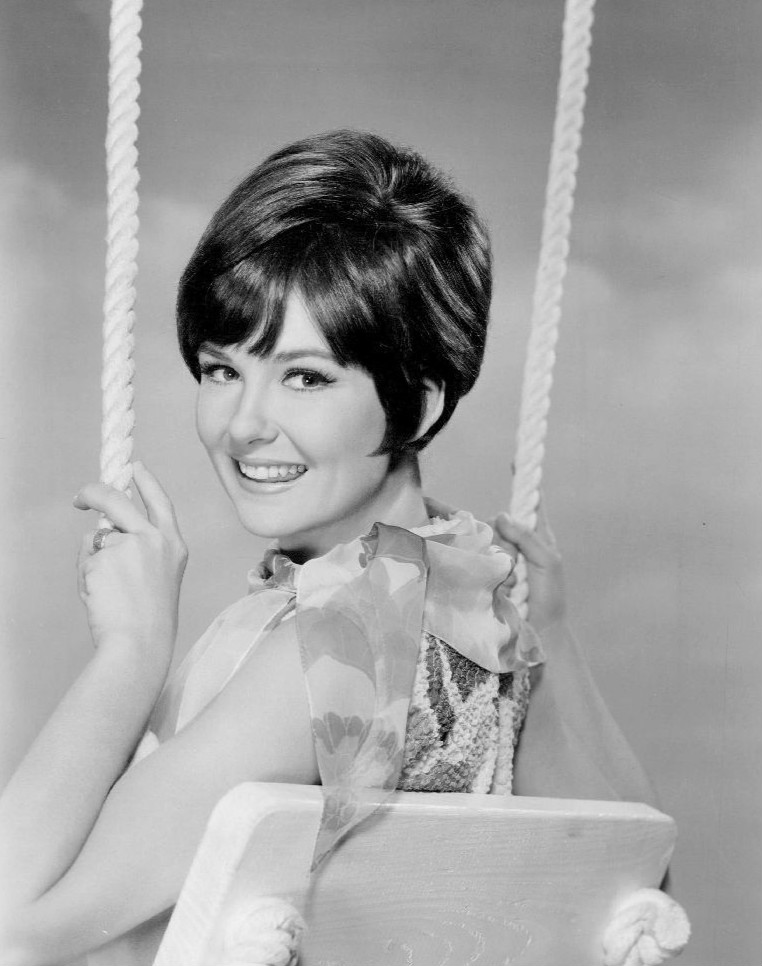
Shelley Fabares

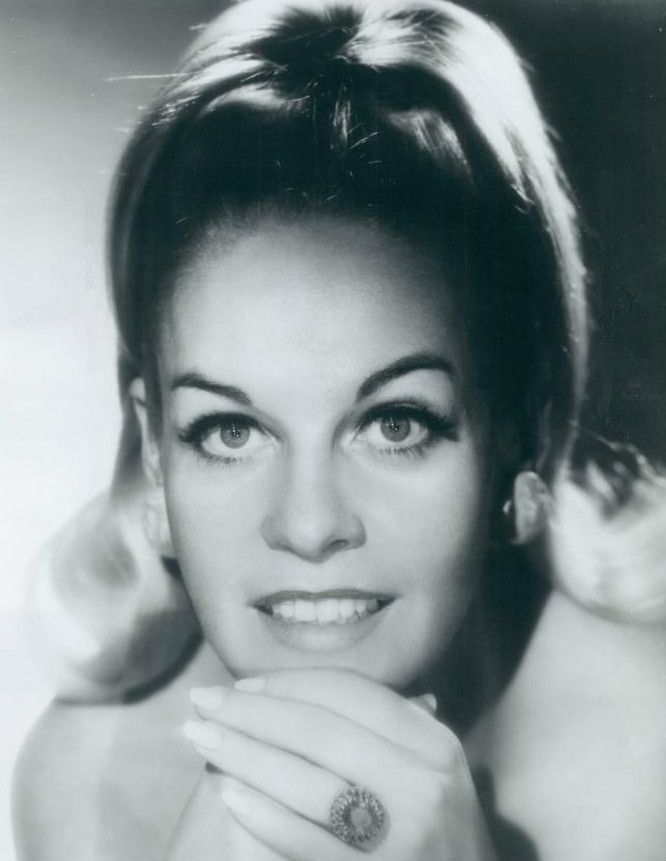
Jaye P. Morgan

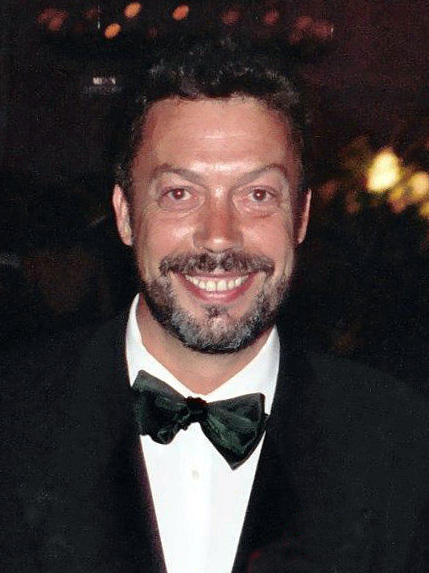
Tim Curry

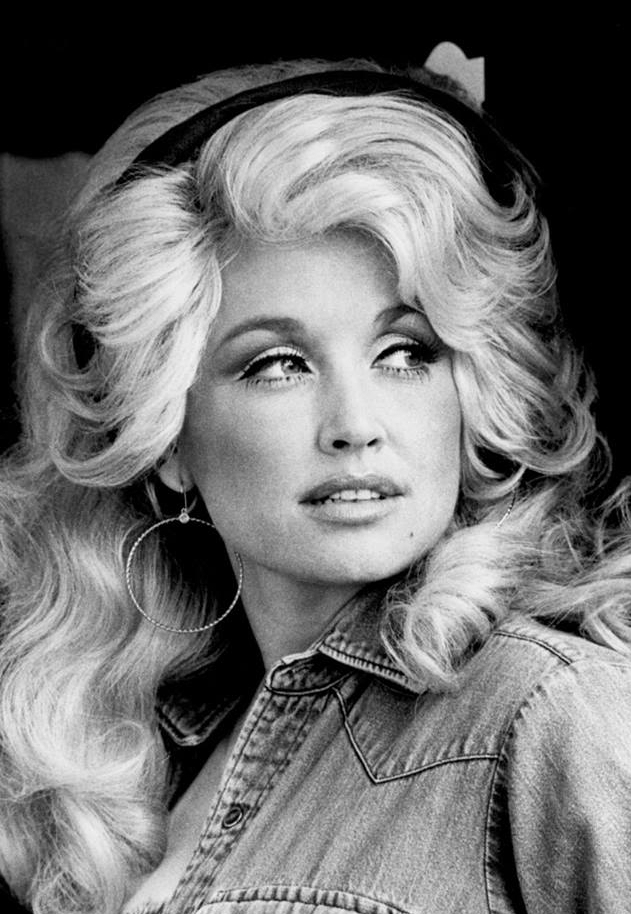
Dolly Parton

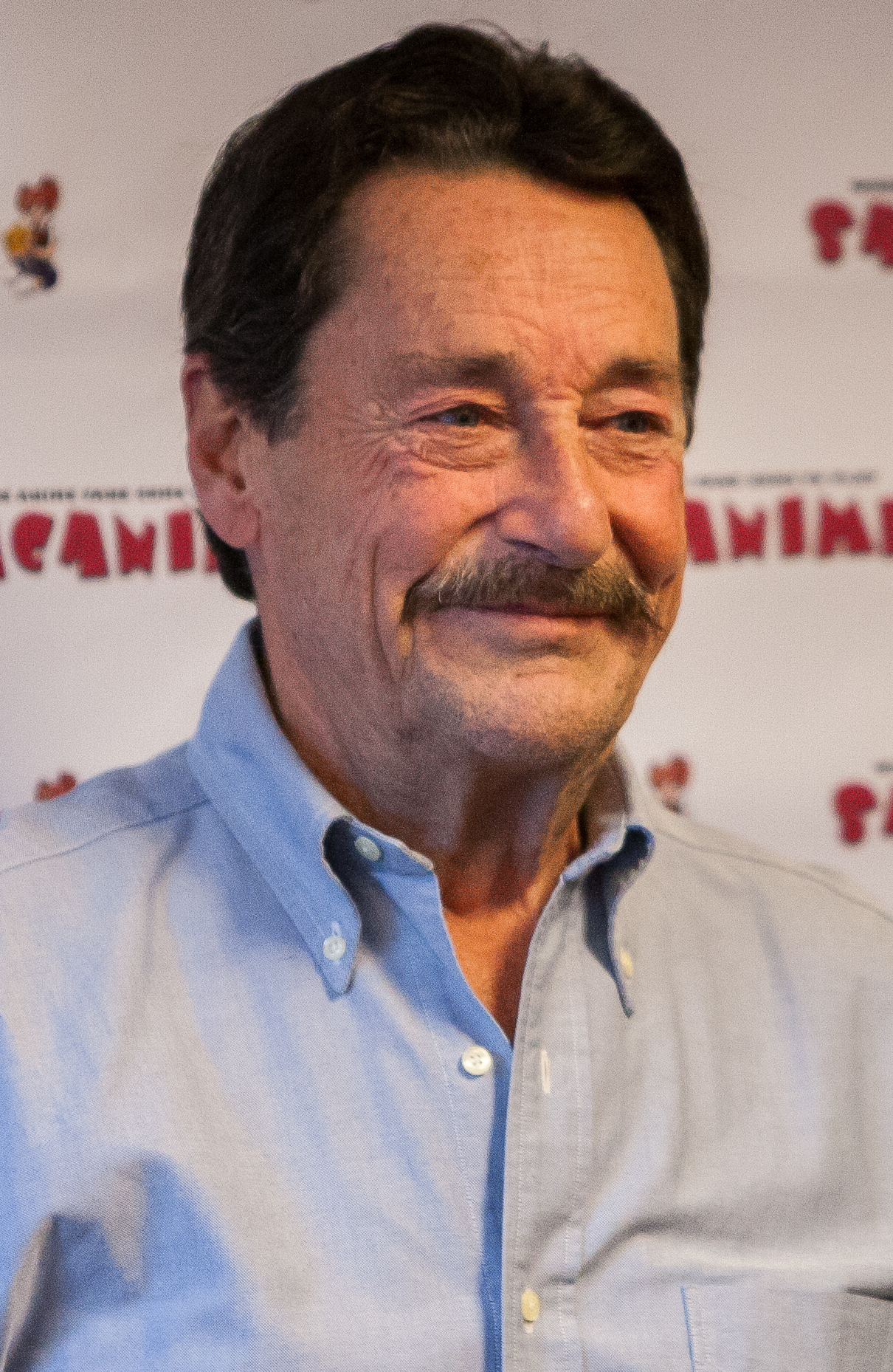
Peter Cullen

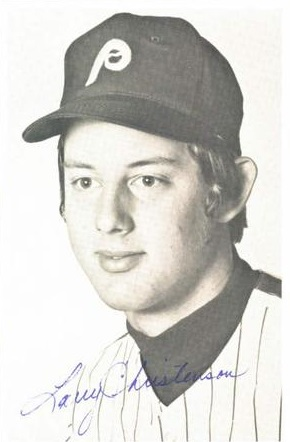
Larry Christenson

- August 1
  - Jonathan Leo Fairbanks, 93, art curator
  - Fred Hoaglin, 82, football player (Cleveland Browns) and coach (New York Giants, New England Patriots)
  - Vincent Pastore, 80, actor (The Sopranos, Gotti, Shark Tale)
  - Monty Roberts, 91, horse trainer
  - Philip Ruppe, 99, politician, member of the U.S. House of Representatives (1967–1979)
- August 2
  - David Z, 78, record producer ("She Drives Me Crazy", "Looking for a New Love") and musician (Lipps Inc.)
  - Bill Goichberg, 83, Hall of Fame chess player
  - Kay Granger, 83, politician, mayor of Fort Worth (1991–1995) and member of the U.S. House of Representatives (1997–2025)
  - Janet Howell, 82, politician, member of the Virginia Senate (1992–2024)
  - Rick Sapienza, 90, football player (New York Titans)
- August 3
  - Jon Cypher, 94, actor (Hill Street Blues, Major Dad, Masters of the Universe)
  - Alfonso Fanjul Jr., 89, Cuban-born sugar refining and real estate executive (Domino Foods)
  - Ray Jarvis, 77, football player (Atlanta Falcons, Detroit Lions, New England Patriots)
  - Herb Snyder, 72, politician, member of the West Virginia Senate (1997–2005, 2009–2017)
  - Iván Szelényi, 88, Hungarian-born sociologist
- August 4
  - Robby Albarado, 52, jockey (death announced on this date)
  - John Damore, 92, football player (Chicago Bears, Mohawk Valley Falcons)
  - Dory Funk Jr., 85, Hall of Fame professional wrestler (NWA, AJPW)
  - Victor Niederhoffer, 82, investor and writer
  - James G. Roche, 86, politician, secretary of the Air Force (2001–2005)
  - Jim Toman, 64, baseball player (NC State Wolfpack) and coach (Liberty Flames, Middle Tennessee Blue Raiders)
  - Terry Trotter, 85, jazz pianist and composer (Everybody Loves Raymond)
- August 5
  - William Ilgenfritz, 79, Anglican clergyman, bishop of All Saints (2009–2021)
  - John Langeloth Loeb Jr., 96, diplomat, ambassador to Denmark (1981–1983)
  - Cozell McQueen, 64, basketball player (NC State Wolfpack, Detroit Pistons) (death announced on this date)
  - Laurence E. Nyquist, 87, planetary scientist
  - Sammy Price, 82, football player (Miami Dolphins)
  - Sydney Towle, 26, American social media influencer
  - Terry Buffalo Ware, 76, guitarist and composer
- August 6
  - Flo Anthony, 74, gossip columnist
  - Ann Bogan, 85, singer (The Marvelettes)
  - Harry C. Dorn, 82, chemist
  - Peter Katsis, 69, music manager (Backstreet Boys, Korn, Jane's Addiction)
  - Martha Rivers Ingram, 90, manufacturing industry executive, CEO of Ingram Industries (1995–1999)
- August 7
  - Chandler David Hendry, 27, social media personality
  - Violet Hensley, 109, luthier and fiddle player
  - Charles Hollis Jones, 81, furniture designer
  - Eugene McDaniel, 94, Navy captain
- August 8
  - William G. Anderson, 98, surgeon
  - Randy Burns, 78, folk singer, songwriter and guitarist
  - John Crowley, 83, writer (Little, Big, Ægypt, Ka – Dar Oakley in the Ruin of Ymr)
  - La Norma Fox, 100, Danish-born aerialist
  - Rick Galbos, 75, football player (Calgary Stampeders, Montreal Alouettes)
  - Bob Jones, 93, Episcopal prelate, bishop of Wyoming (1977–1996)
  - Mike Milford, singer (Scars of Tomorrow) (death announced on this date)
  - Rachel Naomi Remen, 88, pediatrician
  - John Rousmaniere, 82, author and sailor
- August 9
  - Reggie Bannister, 80, actor (Phantasm, Bubba Ho-Tep, Wishmaster)
  - Lynn Council, 93, lynching survivor
  - Brian Dyson, 90, businessman, CEO of Coca-Cola Enterprises (1986–1991)
  - Edward B. Fort, 95, academic administrator, chancellor of North Carolina A&T State University (1981–1999)
  - Ben Jones, 84, actor (The Dukes of Hazzard, Primary Colors) and politician, member of the U.S. House of Representatives (1989–1993)
  - Don Nelson, 86, basketball player (Boston Celtics) and Hall of Fame coach (Golden State Warriors, Dallas Mavericks), five-time NBA champion
- August 10
  - Stan Adelstein, 94, politician, member of the South Dakota House of Representatives (2001–2005) and Senate (2005–2007, 2009–2013)
  - Kermit Davis Sr., 91, college basketball coach (Mississippi State Bulldogs)
  - Prince Mongo, 89, novelty politician
  - Paul Snyder, 94, sports administrator, owner of the Buffalo Braves (1970–1977)
- August 11
  - Ward Churchill, 78, political activist (Little Eichmanns) and writer (On the Justice of Roosting Chickens)
  - Tyler Duckworth, 44, reality television contestant (The Real World: Key West, The Challenge)
  - Harold P. Freeman, 93, physician and patients' rights advocate
  - Mikhail Gulko, 95, Ukrainian-born chanson singer-songwriter
  - Christy Knowings, 46, American actress and comedian (All That)
  - Sensational, 51, Guyanese-born rapper (death announced on this date)
- August 12
  - Nancy Wyman, 80, politician, lieutenant governor of Connecticut (2011–2019), Connecticut state comptroller (1995–2011) and member of the Connecticut House of Representatives (1987–1995)
- August 13
  - Ruby Andrews, 79, soul singer
  - Gregor Benko, 82, music historian (International Piano Archives) (death announced on this date)
  - James T. Laney, 98, diplomat and academic administrator, ambassador to South Korea (1993–1996) and president of Emory University (1977–1993)
  - Mark Rydell, 97, film director (On Golden Pond, The Rose, The River).
  - Jeremy Williams, 42, convicted child rapist and killer (Murder of Kamarie Holland)
- August 14
  - Skip Bertman, 88, baseball player (Miami Hurricanes) and coach (LSU Tigers)
  - George W. Cave, 97, author and CIA agent
  - Mary Heilmann, 86, contemporary artist
  - Brian Holguin, 61, comic book writer
  - Butch Huskey, 54, baseball player (New York Mets)
  - Phil Lyne, 79, rodeo cowboy
  - Dave Marsh, 76, music critic (The Rolling Stone Album Guide), magazine editor (Creem), and radio talk show host (SiriusXM)
  - Duane Nutt, 92, football player (Philadelphia Eagles)
  - Nikki Ross, 54, gospel singer
- August 15
  - Tommy John, 83, baseball player (Los Angeles Dodgers, New York Yankees, Chicago White Sox), namesake of Tommy John surgery
  - John Niland, 82, football player (Dallas Cowboys, Philadelphia Eagles)
  - Randal C. Picker, 66, legal scholar
  - Barry "The Reazar" Richards, 83, radio and television personality
  - Peggy Webber, 100, actress (Dragnet, Macbeth, The Smurfs)
- August 16
  - William G. Anderson, 98, surgeon and civil rights activist
  - Paul Cranis, 91, tennis player (death announced on this date)
  - Hayden Panettiere, 36, actress (Heroes, Nashville, Scream 4)
  - Rex A. Wade, 89, historian
- August 17
  - Frank Beard, 77, Hall of Fame rock drummer (ZZ Top) (b. 1949)
  - O. J. Brigance, 56, football player (Baltimore Ravens, Miami Dolphins, BC Lions)
  - Dick Stevens, 78, football player (Philadelphia Eagles)
- August 18
  - G. Wallace Caulk Jr., 85, politician, member of the Delaware House of Representatives (1985–2006)
  - Cindy Denby, 70, politician, member of the Michigan House of Representatives (2009–2014)
  - Bill Rasmussen, 93, television executive and founder of ESPN
  - Charles Walker, 78, politician, Georgia state senator (1990–2002, 2004–2005)
- August 19
  - Elaine Cheris, 80, Olympic fencer (1988, 1996)
  - Michael Wright, 70, actor (The Five Heartbeats, Streamers, Oz)
- August 20
  - Brent Carter, 77, poker player (death announced on this date)
  - Darrell Hickman, 91, jurist, justice of the Arkansas Supreme Court (1977–1990)
  - Nancy Kissinger, 92, philanthropist and political aide (Nelson Rockefeller)
  - Bunny Levine, 97, actress (Thelma)
- August 21
  - Janie Bradford, 87, songwriter ("Money (That's What I Want)", "Too Busy Thinking About My Baby", "Your Old Standby")
  - Ira A. Fulton, 94, philanthropist
  - Nancy Kassebaum, 94, politician, member of the U.S. Senate (1978–1997)
  - Keith Keith, 64, rapper (Funky 4 + 1)
  - Roger McKenzie, 75, comic book writer (Daredevil, Captain America, Ghost Rider)
  - Dave Morice, 79, poet
- August 22
  - Shelley Fabares, 82, actress (The Donna Reed Show, Coach) and singer ("Johnny Angel")
  - Latimore, 86, soul singer ("Let's Straighten It Out") (death announced on this date)
  - Charlie St. Clair, 76, politician, member of the New Hampshire House of Representatives (2017–2020, since 2022)
  - Slava Veder, 99, photojournalist (Burst of Joy)
- August 23
  - Roy Drinkard, 106, real estate executive
  - Sean Grayson, 32, convicted murderer (murder of Sonya Massey)
  - Dave Kragthorpe, 93, college football player, coach (Idaho State Bengals, Oregon State Beavers) and administrator
  - James Lew, 73, stuntman (Big Trouble in Little China, Inception, Luke Cage) and actor
  - Jay Maisel, 95, photographer (Kind of Blue)
  - Benjamin M. Rosen, 93, businessman, co-founder of Sevin Rosen Funds and CEO of Compaq (1999)
- August 24
  - Jaye P. Morgan, 94, singer ("That's All I Want from You") and actress
  - Storm, 61, reality television competitor (American Gladiators)
- August 25
  - Tim Curry, 80, British-born actor (The Rocky Horror Picture Show, Annie, It) and singer
  - Bernice Gottlieb, 95, adoption activist
  - Anna Louizos, 69, scenic designer and art director
  - Carl M. Morgan, 76, American politician, member of the Alaska House of Representatives (1999–2005). (death announced on this date)
  - Dolly Parton, 80, Hall of Fame singer-songwriter ("Jolene", "I Will Always Love You") and actress (9 to 5), eleven-time Grammy winner
  - Rich Rowland, 62, baseball player (Detroit Tigers, Boston Red Sox)
- August 26
  - Peter Cullen, 85, Canadian-born voice actor (Transformers, Winnie the Pooh, Chip n' Dale Rescue Rangers)
  - George Joseph, 104, insurance executive, founder and chairman of Mercury General (death announced on this date)
  - Samuel Monroe Jr., 52, actor (Menace II Society, The Players Club, Tales from the Hood)
- August 27
  - Bill Edwards, 81, real estate developer
  - Granville Straker, 86, record producer and label owner
  - Mary Tsingou, 97, physicist and mathematician
- August 28
  - Frank Campo, 99, composer (death announced on this date)
  - Larry Christenson, 72, baseball player (Philadelphia Phillies), World Series champion (1980)
  - Bill Doba, 85, college football coach (Washington State Cougars)
  - Jackie Glass, 70, judge and television personality (Swift Justice with Jackie Glass)
  - Ray Miller, 77, politician, member of the Ohio House of Representatives (1983–1993, 1999–2002) and Senate (2003–2010)
  - Kenneth Treister, 96, architect (Holocaust Memorial of the Greater Miami Jewish Federation)
  - Wacko, 52, rapper (UTP)
- August 29
  - Gene Bertoncini, 89, jazz guitarist
  - David Fair, punk rock musician (Half Japanese) and artist
  - Frankie Miller, 95, country music singer
- August 31
  - Wendell Berry, 92, novelist and essayist (The Unsettling of America)
  - Kippy Brown, 71, football coach (Houston Texans, Detroit Lions, Seattle Seahawks)
  - Arthur Marshall, 57, football player (Denver Broncos, New York Giants)
  - Victor Miller, 86, screenwriter (Friday the 13th) and television writer (Another World, Guiding Light)
  - Bill Schmidt, 78, Olympic javelin thrower (1972)
  - Jerry Stovall, 85, Hall of Fame football player (LSU Tigers, St. Louis Cardinals) and coach (LSU Tigers)

== September ==
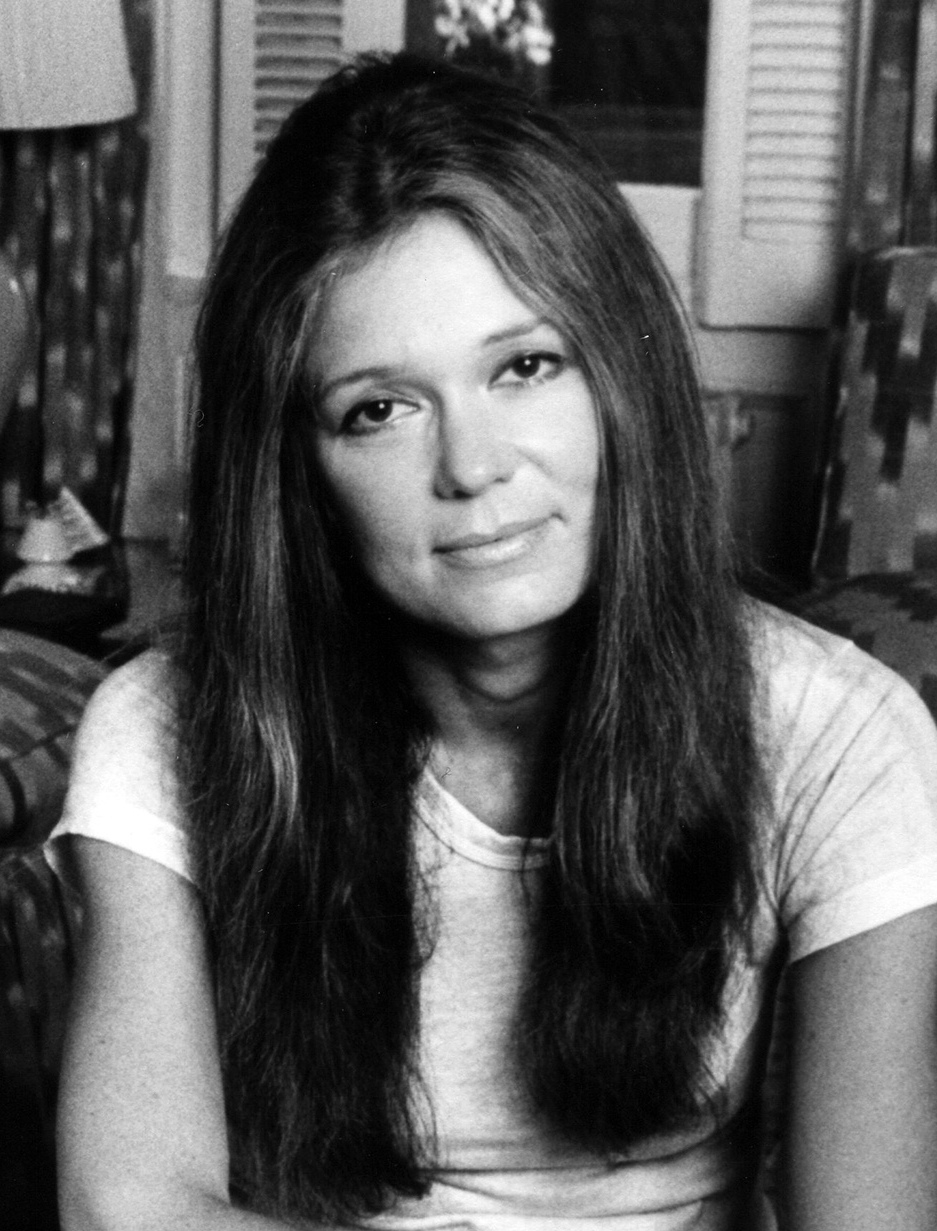
Gloria Steinem

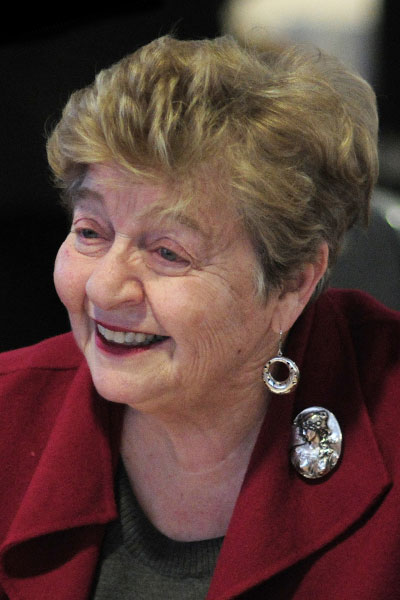
Shirley Strum Kenny

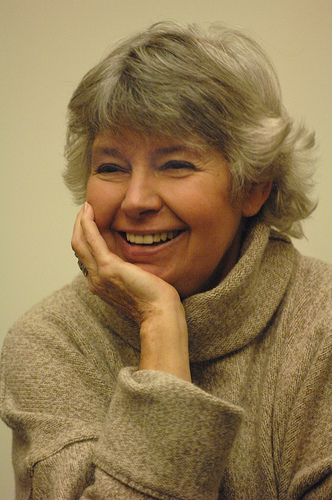
Robin Morgan

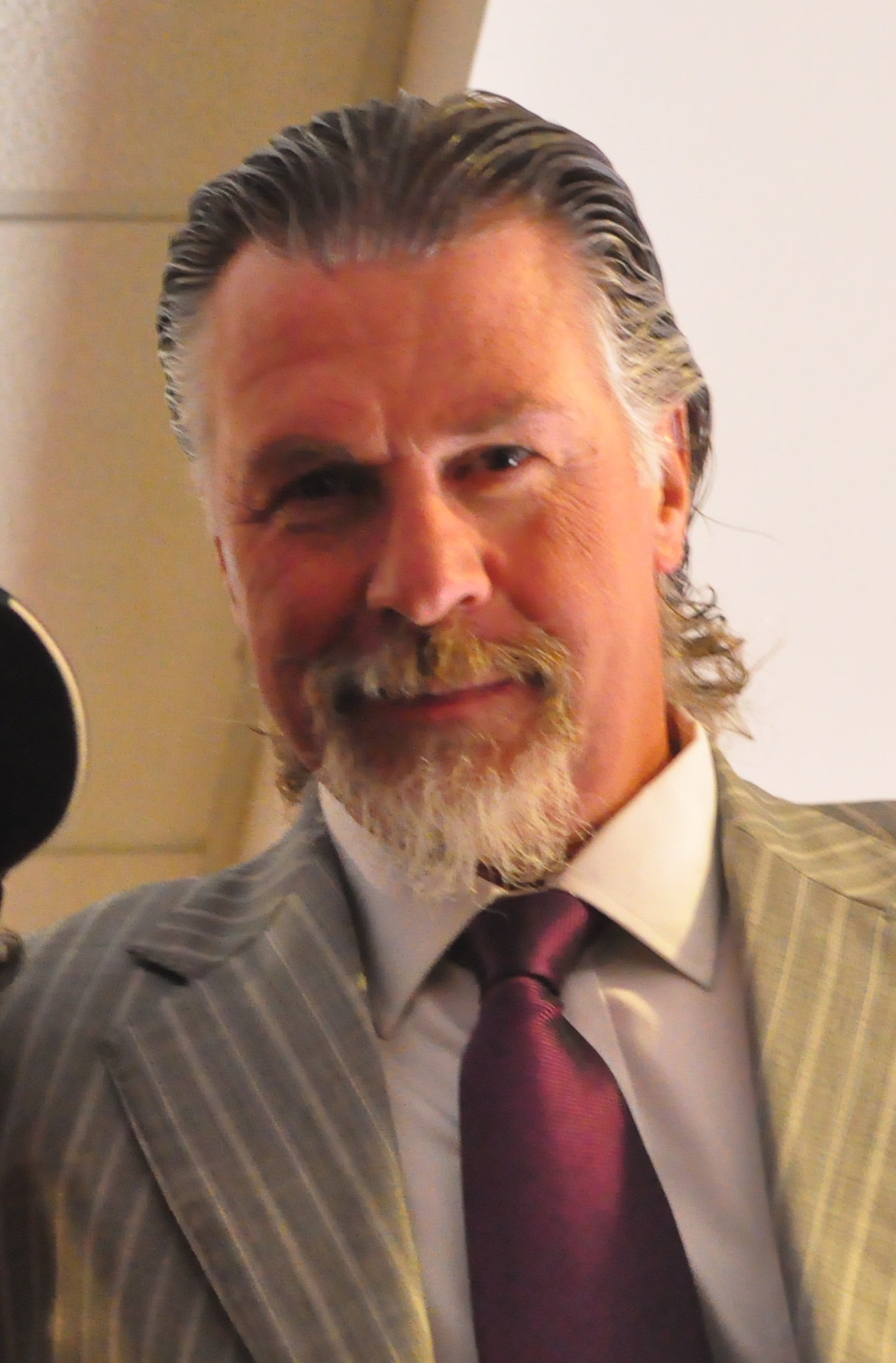
Barry Melrose

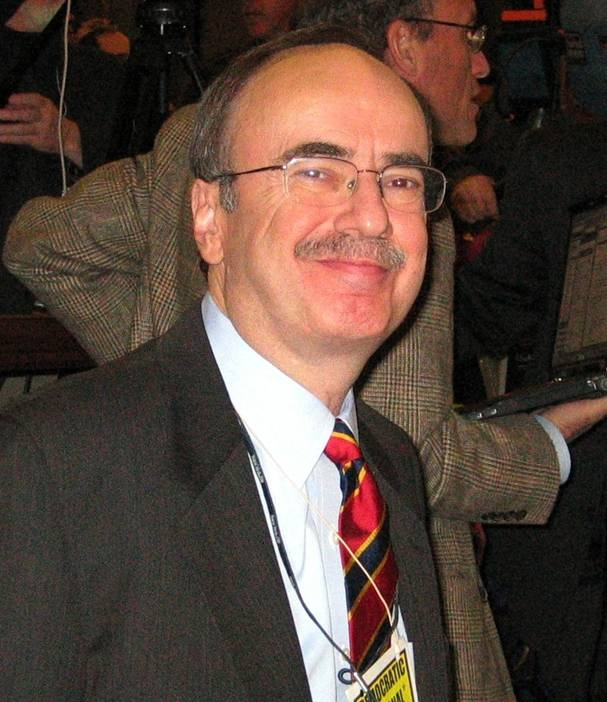
Roger Simon

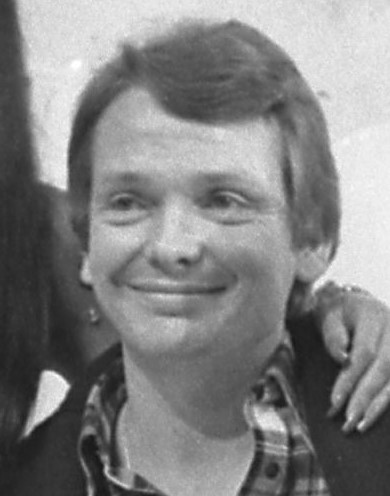
Bob Mackie

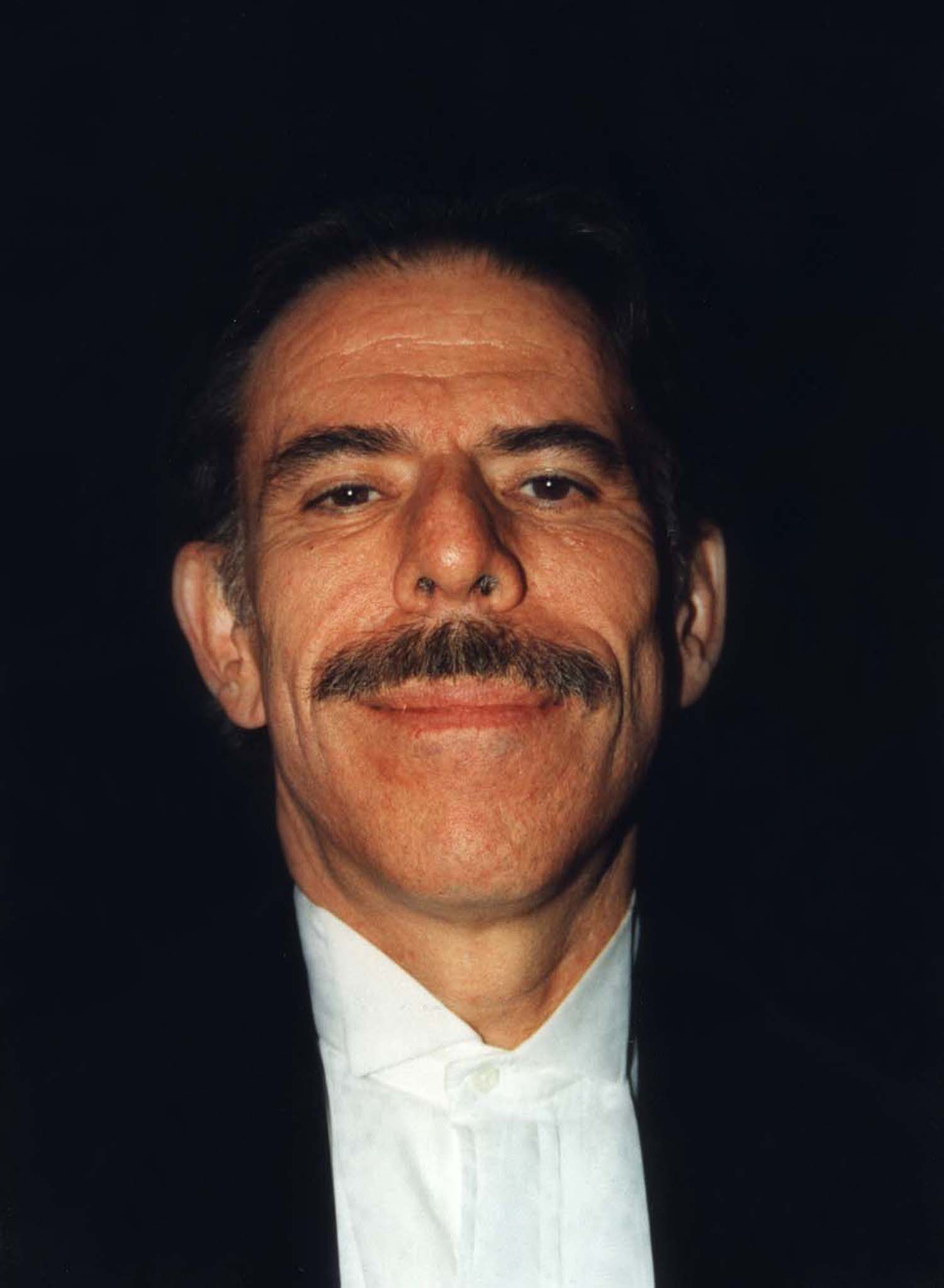
Peter Max

Gerrit Graham

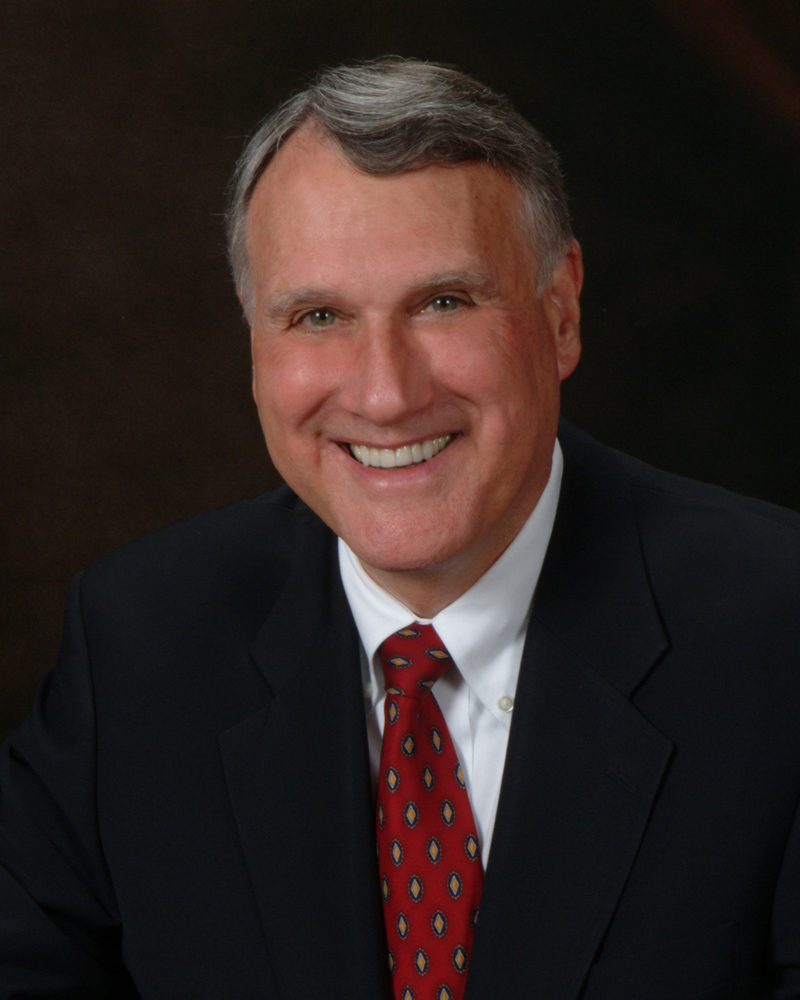
Jon Kyl

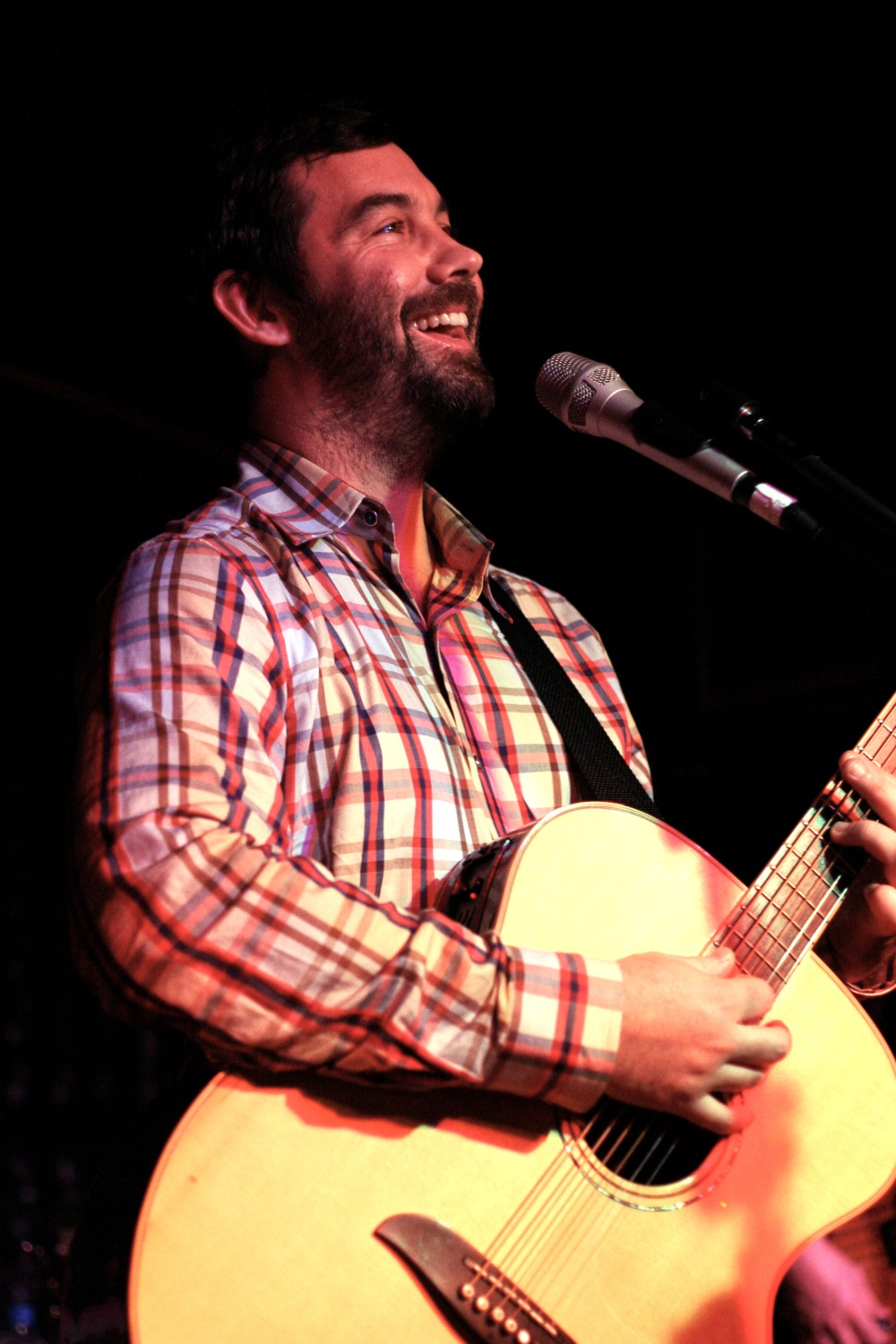
Duncan Sheik

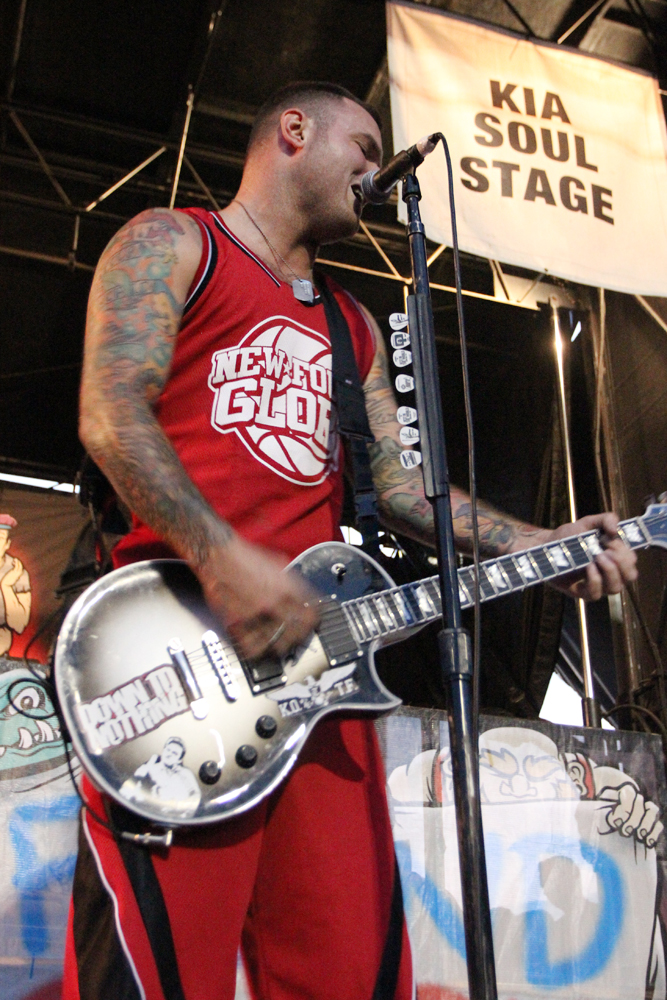
Chad Gilbert

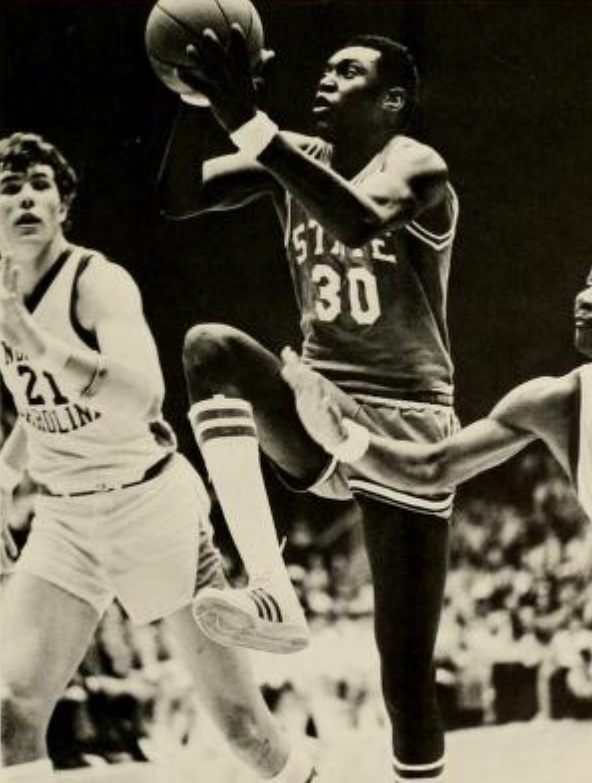
Phil Spence

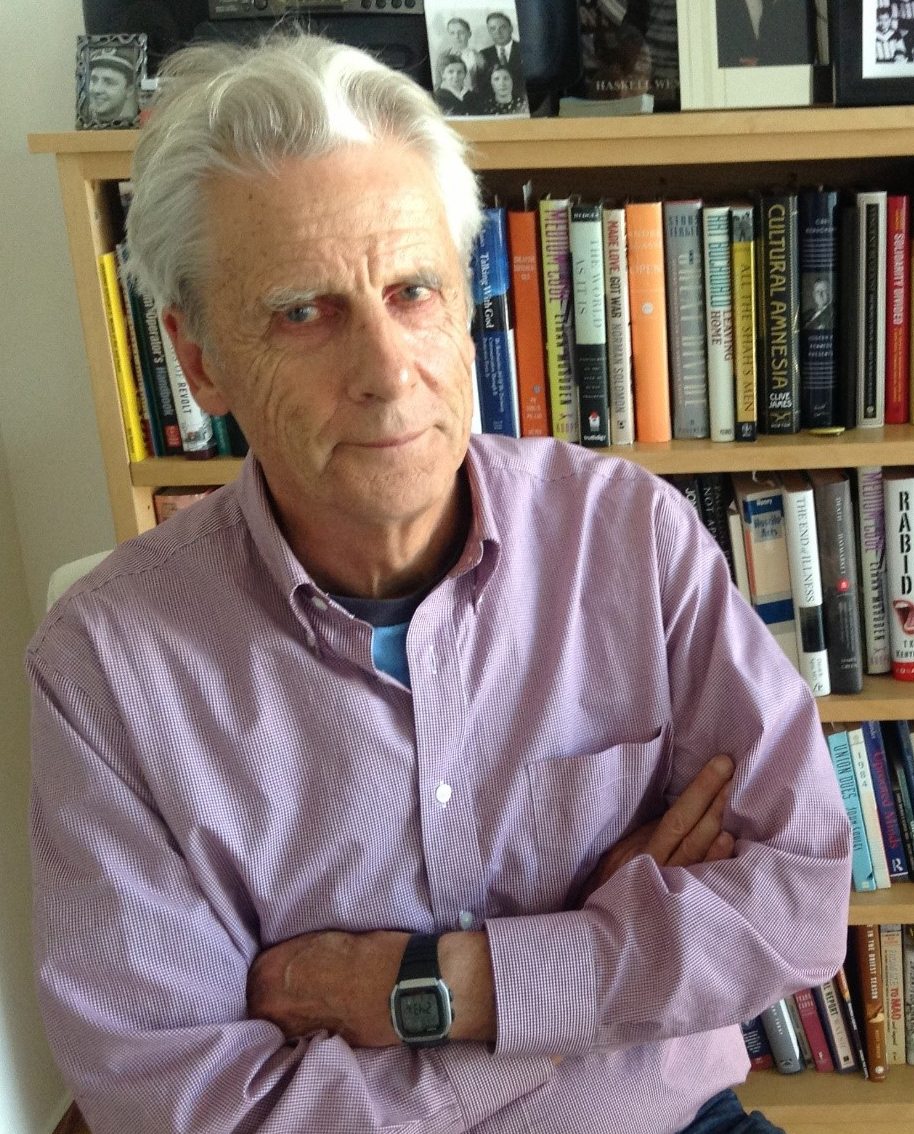
James Becket

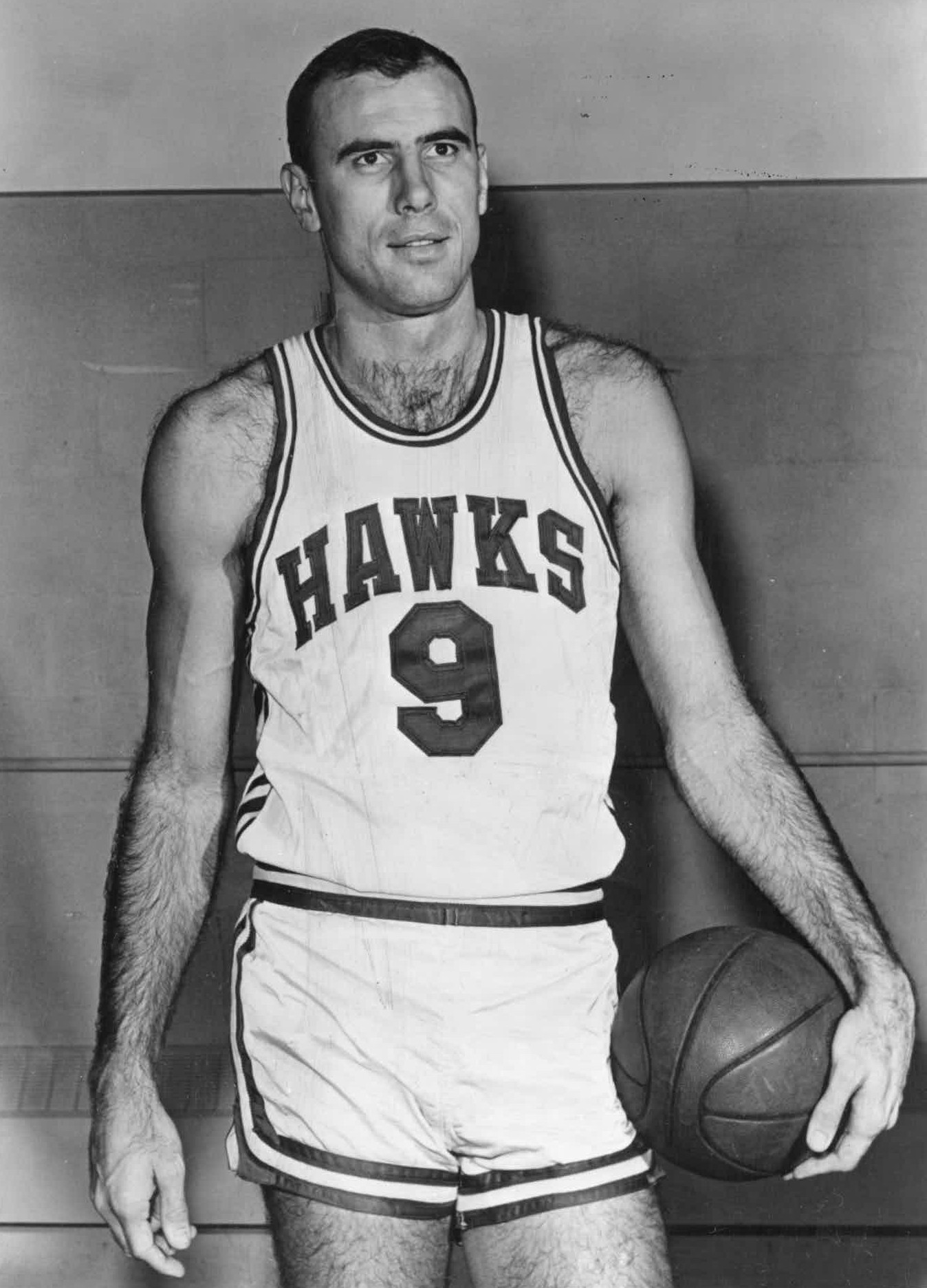
Bob Pettit

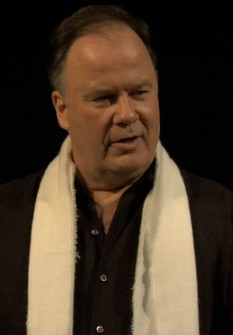
Dennis Haskins

- September 1
  - Edythe Harrison, 91, politician Virginia House of Delegates
  - Charles Hatcher, 87, politician, member of the U.S. (1981–1993) and the Georgia House of Representatives (1973–1980)
  - Konrad Jarausch, 85, German-born historian
  - Carla Jeffery, 33, actress (Zombies, Curb Your Enthusiasm, American Vandal)
  - Harold Gene Lucas, 74, convicted murderer
  - Hinson Mosley, 93, politician, member of the Georgia House of Representatives (1992–2006)
  - Jim Sockwell, 84, ceramicist
  - Cassandra Wilson, 70, jazz singer, two-time Grammy winner (1997, 2009)
- September 2
  - Rich DeMartino, 87, bridge player
  - Rachel Blau DuPlessis, 84, poet and essayist
  - Robert A. Kyle, 98, academic
  - Ken Lancaster, 83, politician, member of the Alaska House of Representatives (2001–2003)
  - Alphonso Smith, 40, football player (Detroit Lions, Denver Broncos)
  - Gloria Steinem, 92, feminist, journalist (New York), and writer (Marilyn: Norma Jean), co-founder of the Women's Media Center
- September 3
  - Isaac M. Daniel, 92, engineer
  - Joseph F. Rice, 72, lawyer
  - Jim Sutton, 91, Hall of Fame stock contractor
- September 4
  - Ulrich C. Knoepflmacher, 95, German-born literary scholar
  - Jerry Oates, 78, professional wrestler
  - Jon Small, 79, drummer (The Hassles, Attila) and music video director ("Walk This Way")
  - Don Wilhelms, 96, geologist
- September 5
  - C. Richard D'Amato, 83, politician and Navy Reserve captain, member of the Maryland House of Delegates (1999–2003)
  - Felton Earls, 84, child psychiatrist and epidemiologist
  - Andy Fish, 60, graphic novelist
  - Shirley Strum Kenny, 92, academic administrator, president of Stony Brook University (1994–2009) and Queens College (1985–1994)
  - Bruce Lunsford, 78, politician and attorney
  - Joe Morgan, 95, baseball player (Cleveland Indians, St. Louis Cardinals) and manager (Boston Red Sox)
  - Robin Morgan, 85, poet, writer (Sisterhood Is Powerful) and feminist, co-founder of the Women's Media Center
  - Andy Williams, 48, guitarist (Every Time I Die) and professional wrestler (All Elite Wrestling)
- September 6
  - Hadassah Carlebach, 98, Russian-born Holocaust survivor and memoirist
  - Edward Field, 102, poet
  - Jim Geoghan, 79, television writer and producer (The Suite Life of Zack & Cody, Family Matters, Silver Spoons)
  - John O'Leary, 72, football player (Chicago Bears, Montreal Alouettes)
  - Nina Shipman, 88, actress (Say One for Me, Blue Denim, The Oregon Trail)
  - Matt Suhey, 68, football player (Chicago Bears)
- September 7
  - David Cobb, 63, activist and presidential candidate
  - Jonathan Cooper, 76, luthier
  - Marty Lowe, 54, football player (St. Louis Stampede, Texas Terror) and coach (Georgia Force)
  - Lucien Smith, 37, contemporary artist
  - David Worth, 86, film director (Kickboxer, Warrior of the Lost World) and cinematographer (Bloodsport)
- September 8
  - William Henry Draper III, 98, venture capitalist, chairman of EXIM (1981–1986) and administrator of the UNDP (1986–1993)
  - Mary Rude, 92, singer (The Dream Weavers)
  - Pat Senatore, 91, jazz bassist
  - Tom Whitestone, 62, sport coach, associate athletic director at the University of North Carolina at Charlotte (1987–2024)
- September 9
  - Ranee Brylinski, 69, mathematician
  - Bryan Isacks, 90, geophysicist
  - Edward H. Lehner, 93, politician, member of the New York State Assembly (1973–1980)
  - Mike McFarland, 56, voice actor (Dragon Ball Z, Fullmetal Alchemist, Attack on Titan)
  - Barry Melrose, 70, Canadian-born ice hockey player (Toronto Maple Leafs), coach (Los Angeles Kings) and sportscaster (ESPN)
  - Gaylyn Studlar, 73, feminist and film and media critic
- September 10
  - Daniel Conahan, 72, serial killer
  - Marilyn Edwards, 88, politician, member of the Arkansas House of Representatives (2003–2009)
  - Bob McKay, 78, football player (Cleveland Browns, New England Patriots)
  - Gary Myers, 76, racing driver (NASCAR)
  - Roger Simon, 78, journalist (Politico, Chicago Tribune, Bloomberg News) and writer
- September 11
  - Paul Bender, 93, attorney and legal scholar
  - Bain Boehlke, 87, actor (Fargo, Four Boxes) and theatre director
  - Bruce M. Davis, 83, convicted murderer (Manson family)
  - Robert E. Dickinson, 86, meteorologist
  - Elaine Mokhtefi, 97, anti-colonial activist and writer
- September 12
  - Ellen Brandom, 84, politician, member of the Missouri House of Representatives (2007–2013)
  - Michael Brennan, 83, British-born economist and academic
  - Tone Capone, 59, hip-hop producer ("I Got 5 on It")
  - Iris Engstrand, 91, academic
  - Lars Herseth, 80, politician, member of the South Dakota House of Representatives (1975–1986) and Senate (1989–1996)
  - Tanchum Portnoy, 75, Jewish music composer
  - Byron Sher, 98, politician, member of the California State Assembly (1980–1996) and Senate (1996–2004)
  - Rafael Sorkin, 80, physicist
- September 13
  - BloodHound Q50, 22, rapper
  - Cheetah Chrome, 71, guitarist (Dead Boys, Rocket from the Tombs) and songwriter ("Sonic Reducer")
  - Jim Collier, 87, football player (New York Giants, Washington Redskins)
  - Ann Kaiser, 78, academic
- September 14
  - Bob Mackie, 87, costume designer (The Carol Burnett Show, Funny Lady, The Sonny & Cher Comedy Hour), seven-time Emmy winner
  - Peter Max, 88, German-born pop artist
- September 15
  - Rosalind Ashford, 83, Hall of Fame singer (Martha and the Vandellas)
  - Jim Bradshaw, 87, football player (Pittsburgh Steelers)
  - Annie Dillard, 81, writer (Tickets for a Prayer Wheel, Pilgrim at Tinker Creek, The Maytrees), Pulitzer Prize winner (1975)
  - Ronnie Dove, 91, pop and country singer (“Say You”, “Hello Pretty Girl”, “A Little Bit of Heaven”)
  - Gerrit Graham, 77, actor (Phantom of the Paradise, Used Cars, The Critic)
  - Bonnie Greer, 77, American-born British playwright (Marilyn and Ella), critic and novelist
  - David C. Kronick, 94, politician, member of the New Jersey General Assembly (1988–1994)
  - Eliana Moreno, news journalist (KNBC, KVEA)
  - Brian Wolfe, 45, baseball player (Fukuoka SoftBank Hawks, Toronto Blue Jays, Saitama Seibu Lions)
  - Fredd Young, 64, football player (Seattle Seahawks, Indianapolis Colts)
- September 16
  - Tim Janus, 49, competitive eater
  - Randy Pedersen, 64, bowler and sportscaster
  - Dolores Sibonga, 94–95, lawyer, member of the Seattle City Council (1978, 1980–1992)
- September 17
  - Jerry Thomas Howard, 90, politician, member of the Missouri Senate (1990–2000)
  - Jon Kyl, 84, politician, U.S. senator (1995–2013, 2018) and member of the U.S. House of Representatives (1987–1995)
  - Jeffery Lee, 49, convicted murderer
  - Barry T. Parker, 93, politician, member of the New Jersey General Assembly (1966–1972) and Senate (1972–1982)
  - Duncan Sheik, 56, singer-songwriter ("Barely Breathing") and composer (Spring Awakening), Tony winner (2007)
  - Wesley Shermantine, 60, serial killer (Speed Freak Killers)
  - Kevin Spencer, 71, musician (Dynasty)
  - Michael Sweetney, 43, basketball player (New York Knicks, Chicago Bulls, Shaanxi Kylins) and coach
  - P. C. Vey, 70, cartoonist (The New Yorker, Mad, National Lampoon)
- September 18
  - Albert S. Axelrad, 87, rabbi and author
  - Bryan Bishop, 48, radio personality
  - Mike Burton, 79, Olympic swimmer.
  - Margaret Chant-Papandreou, 102, American-born Greek women’s rights activist, political consort and writer.
  - Arthur B. Hancock III, 83, Thoroughbred racehorse breeder, owner of Stone Farm
  - Richard Harrison, 90, actor (Secret Agent Fireball, 100.000 dollari per Ringo, The Invincible Gladiator)
  - Arthur R. Kudart, 96, politician, member of the Iowa Senate (1979–1983)
  - Karal Ann Marling, 82, historian and writer
- September 19
  - Tyler Abell, 94, lawyer, chief of protocol (1968–1969)
  - Ernie Accorsi, 84, football executive (Baltimore Colts, Cleveland Browns, New York Giants)
  - Arthur Asa Berger, 93, author and academic
  - Rudy Cheeks, 76, musician (The Young Adults) and newspaper columnist (The Providence Phoenix)
  - Richard Giragosian, 61, Armenian-born academic
  - Elliot Graham, 50, film editor (Milk, Captain Marvel, No Time to Die), BAFTA winner (2022)
  - Carolyn J. B. Howard, 87, politician, member of the Maryland House of Delegates (1988–1990, 1991–2019)
- September 20
  - Bruce Bergey, 80, football player (Kansas City Chiefs, Houston Oilers, Toronto Argonauts)
  - Presley Gerber, 27, model
  - Chad Gilbert, 45, guitarist (New Found Glory), songwriter ("Hit or Miss", "All Downhill from Here"), and record producer
- September 21
  - Chris Spatola, 47, college basketball player (Army Black Knights) and analyst
  - Phil Spence, 72, college basketball player (NC State) and coach (North Carolina Central)
- September 22
  - James Becket, 89, filmmaker and human rights lawyer
  - Joshua Cassara, 46, comic book artist (X-Force, Falcon, New Avengers)
  - Don Cooper, 70, baseball player (Minnesota Twins, New York Yankees) and coach (Chicago White Sox)
  - George N. Gillett Jr., 87, sports executive, chairman of Liverpool F.C. (2007–2010)
  - David Hollister, 84, politician, member of the Michigan House of Representatives (1975–1993) and mayor of Lansing (1994–2003)
  - Zeke Moore, 82, football player (Houston Oilers)
  - Donald Weder, 79, inventor and businessman
- September 23
  - Dee Brock, 96, cheerleading director
  - Garnet Coleman, 65, politician, member of the Texas House of Representatives (1991–2022)
  - Harriet Hancock, 89, LGBT rights activist (death announced on this date)
  - Bob Pettit, 93, Hall of Fame basketball player (Milwaukee / St. Louis Hawks)
  - Edward Rogalski, 84, academic administrator, president of St. Ambrose University (1987–2007)
  - Leon Sirois, 91, racing driver
  - Lawrence Tanter, 76, public address announcer (Los Angeles Lakers)
- September 24
  - John Baer, 79, journalist (Philadelphia Daily News)
  - Roy Belliveau, 96, basketball player (Scranton Miners) and coach
  - Bill Cahill, 75, football player (Buffalo Bills)
  - Richard Mulcahey, 91, politician, member of the Illinois House of Representatives (1975–1993)
- September 25
  - Bill Giles, 92, baseball executive (Philadelphia Phillies)
  - Jeoff Long, 84, baseball player (St. Louis Cardinals, Chicago White Sox)
  - Chuck Varga, 68, musician (Gwar)
- September 26
  - Bob Agee, 88, academic administrator, president of Oklahoma Baptist University (1982–1998)
  - David Millage, 73, politician, member of the Iowa House of Representatives (1991–2003)
  - David Ring, 72, evangelist
  - James H. Rosenfield, 97, television executive (CBS)
  - Angela Stribling, 58, television and radio host (BET, WJZ-TV), and singer
- September 27
  - Frank Busch, 75, swimming coach
  - Dennis Haskins, 75, actor (Saved by the Bell, Clemency, Max Keeble's Big Move)
  - Pac, 40, professional wrestler (AEW, WWE, Dragongate)
  - Manuel Seal, 66, record producer and songwriter ("Just Kickin' It", "My Boo", "We Belong Together"). Grammy winner (2006)
- September 28
  - Kathy Cornelius, 93, golfer
  - Jacek Furdyna, 93, Polish-born physicist
  - Gordon Johncock, 90, racing driver, Indianapolis 500 winner (1973, 1982)
  - Dottie Martin, 89, educator, first lady of North Carolina (1975–1983)
  - Armando Vega, 90, Olympic gymnast (1956) and coach
- September 29
  - Tay Baker, 99, American basketball player (Cincinnati Bearcats) and coach (Cincinnati Bearcats, Xavier Musketeers)
  - Jan Jarboe Russell, 75, journalist and writer
- September 30
  - Scott Froschauer, 57, artist, sculptor, and key grip
  - Keith B. McMullin, 85, Latter-Day Saint operating executive, CEO of Deseret Management Corporation (2012–2023)
  - Pat Saiki, 96, politician, member of the U.S. House of Representatives (1987–1991) and administrator of the Small Business Administration (1991–1993)

== October ==
Brooke Eby

Mary Louise Weller

Marjoe Gortner

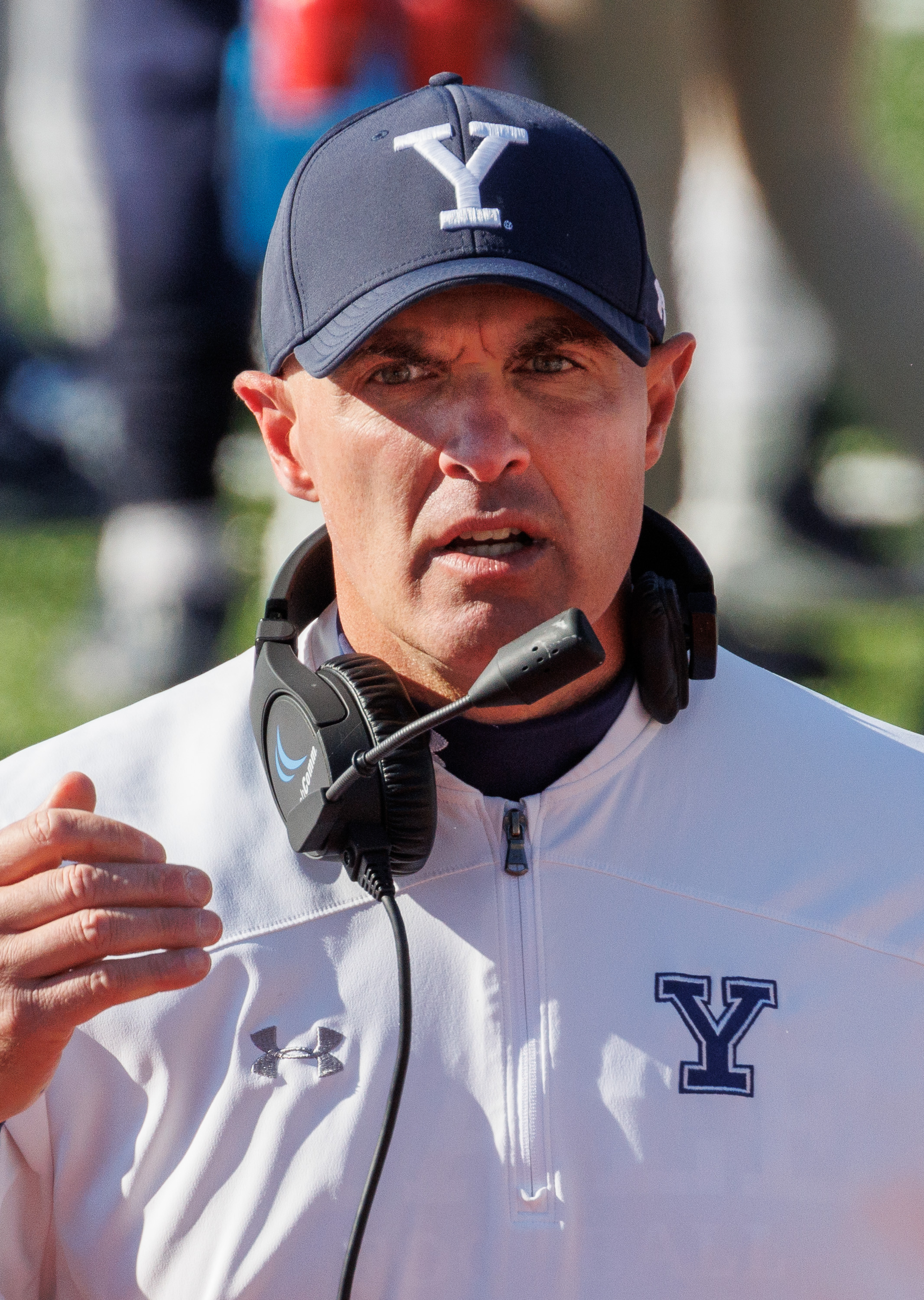
Tony Reno

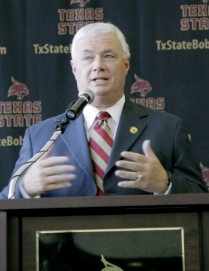
Dennis Franchione

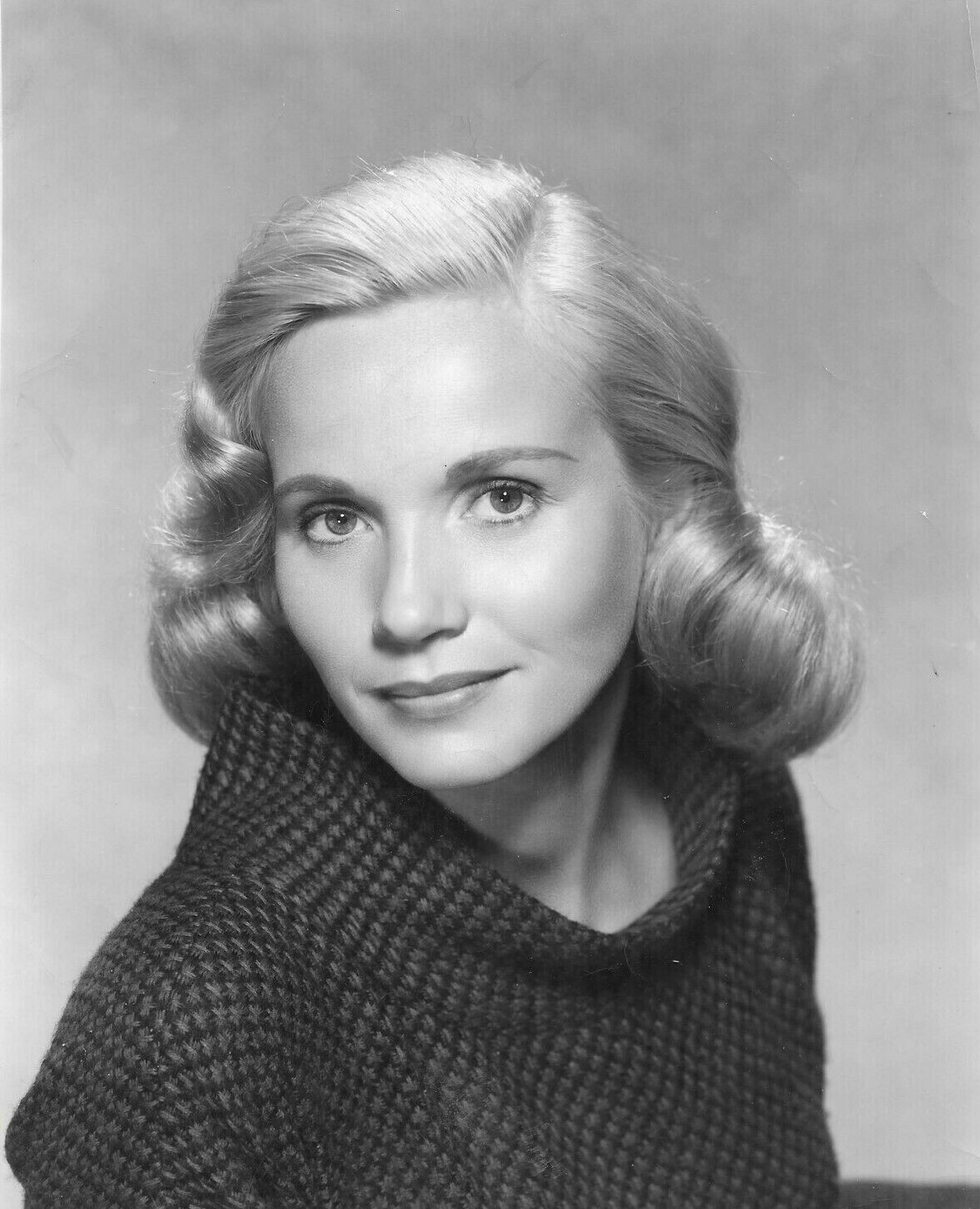
Eva Marie Saint

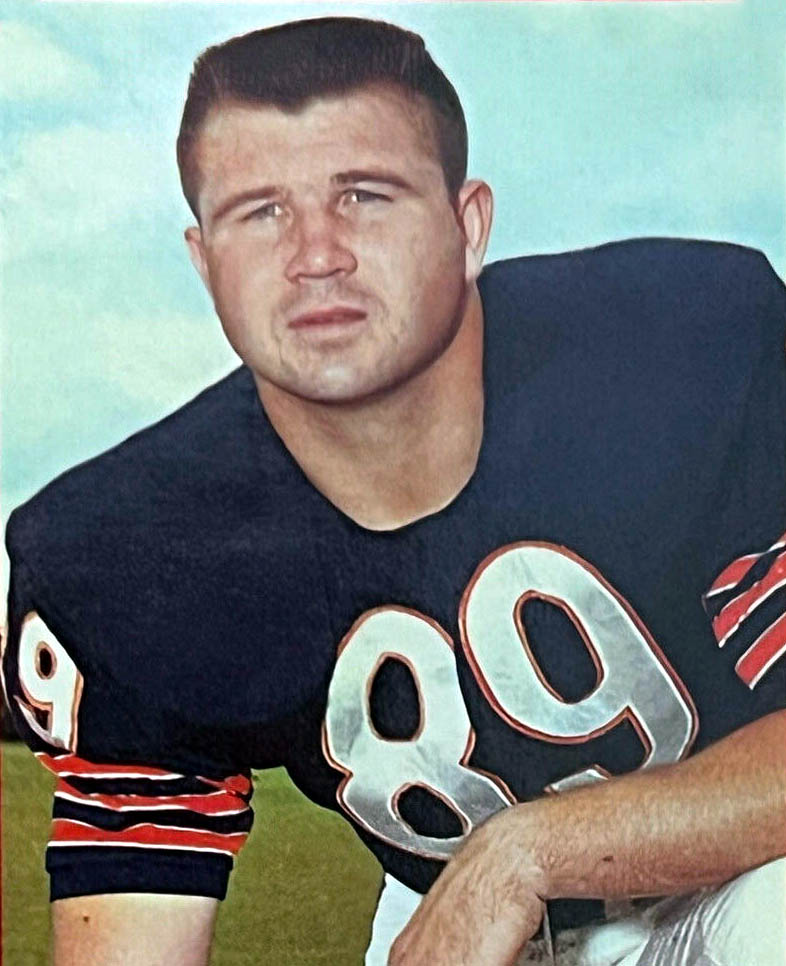
Mike Ditka

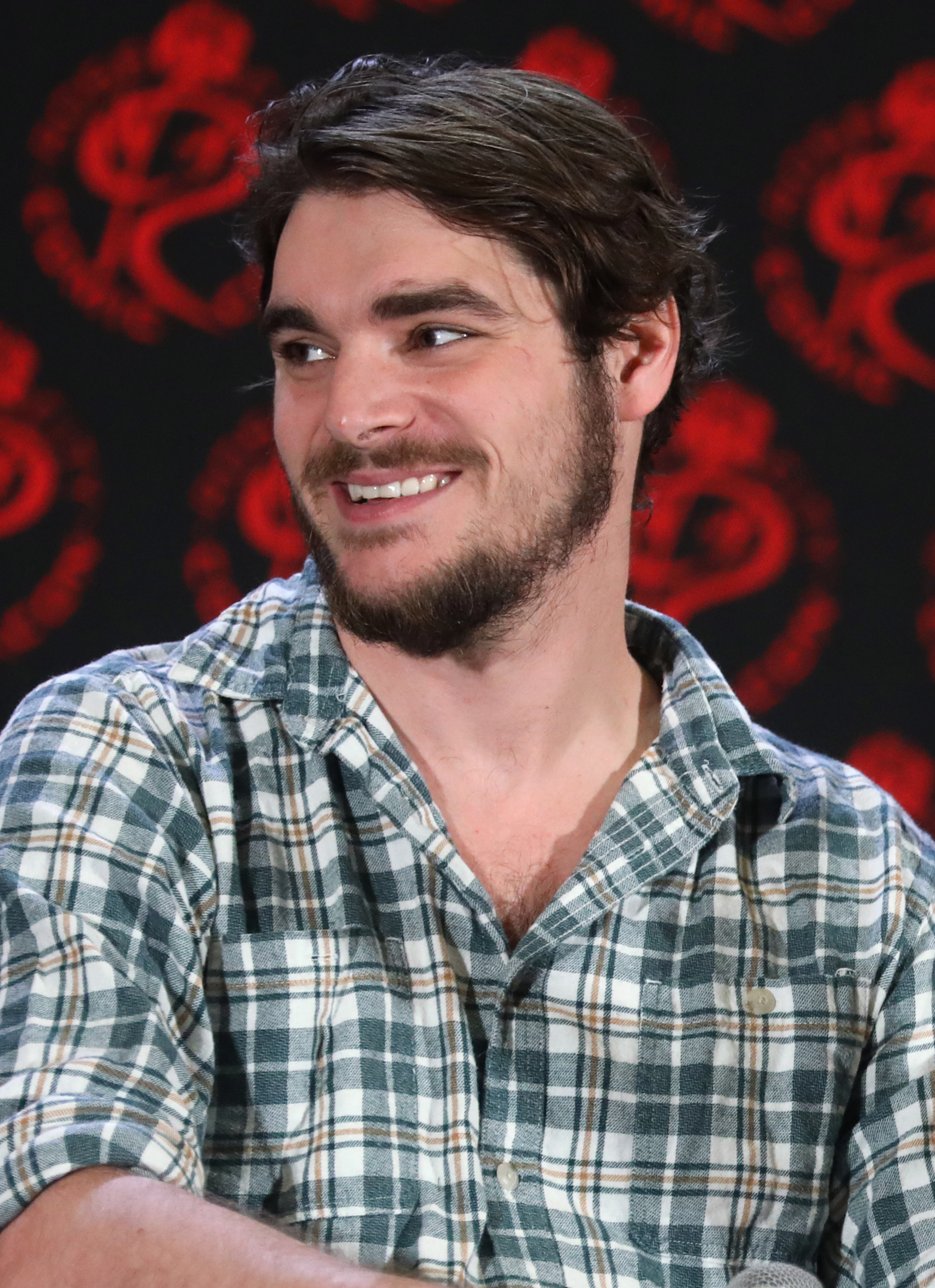
RJ Mitte

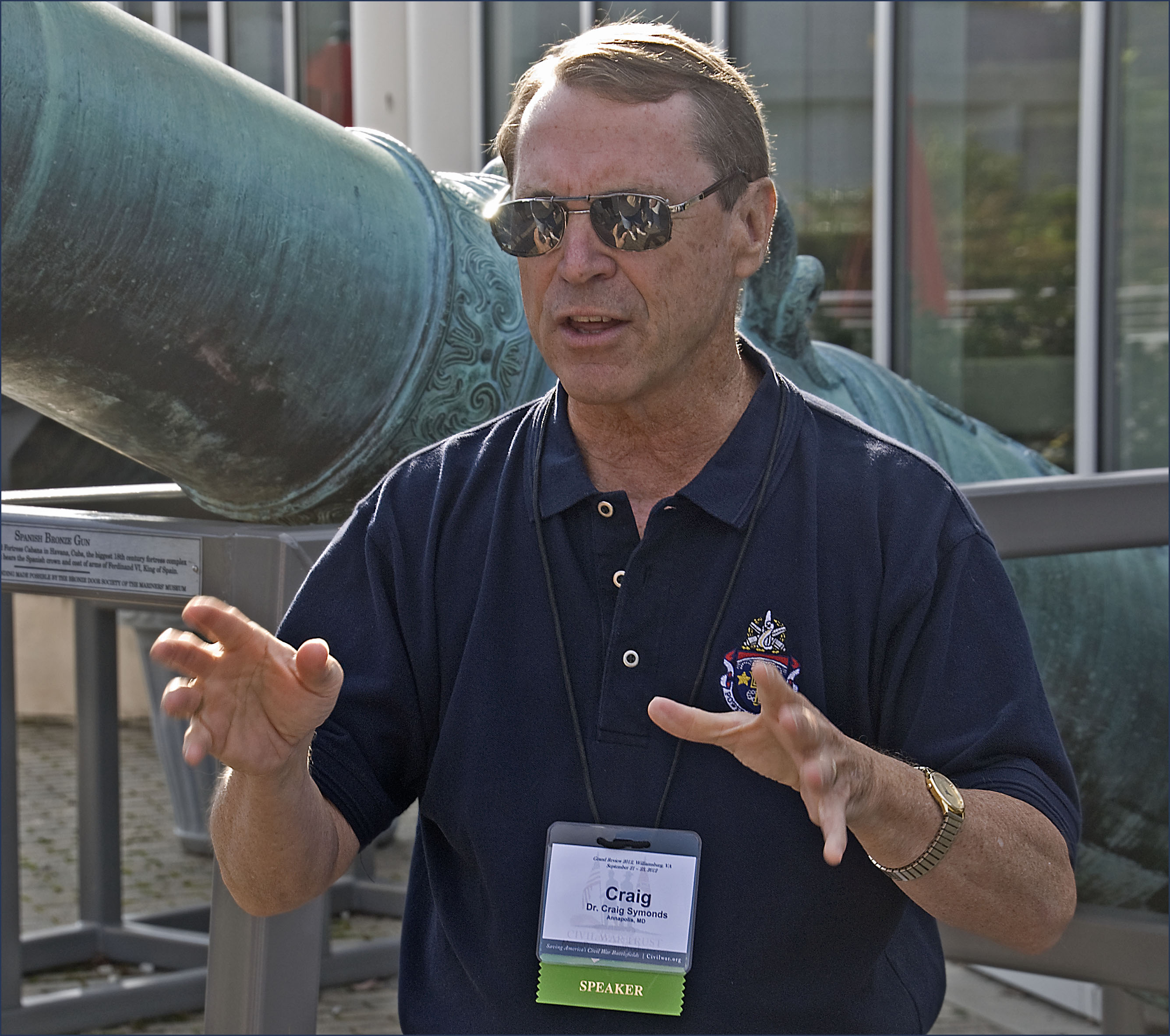
Craig L. Symonds

Michael Forest

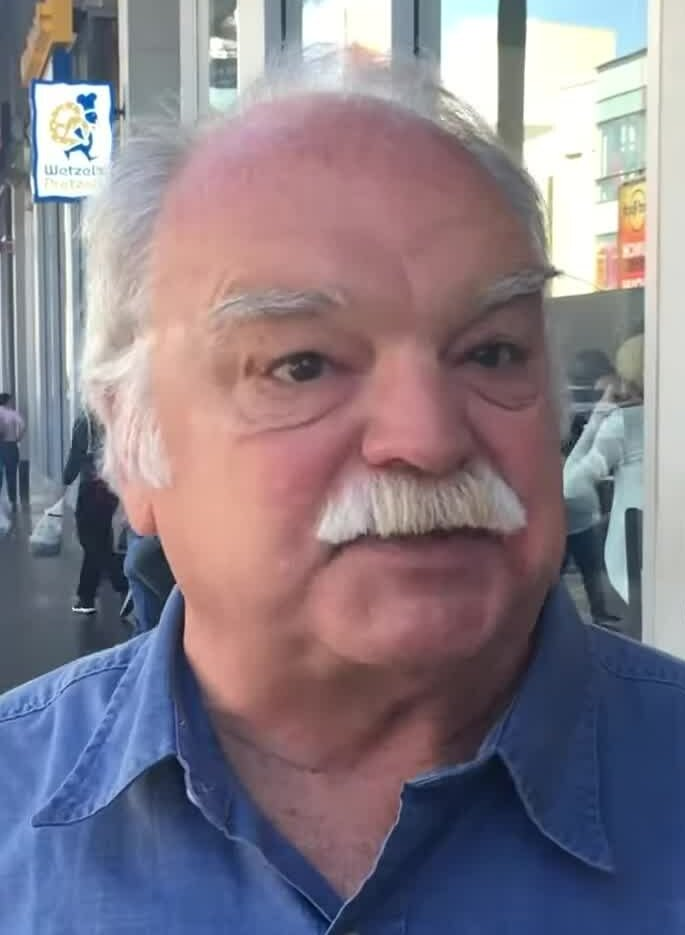
Richard Riehle

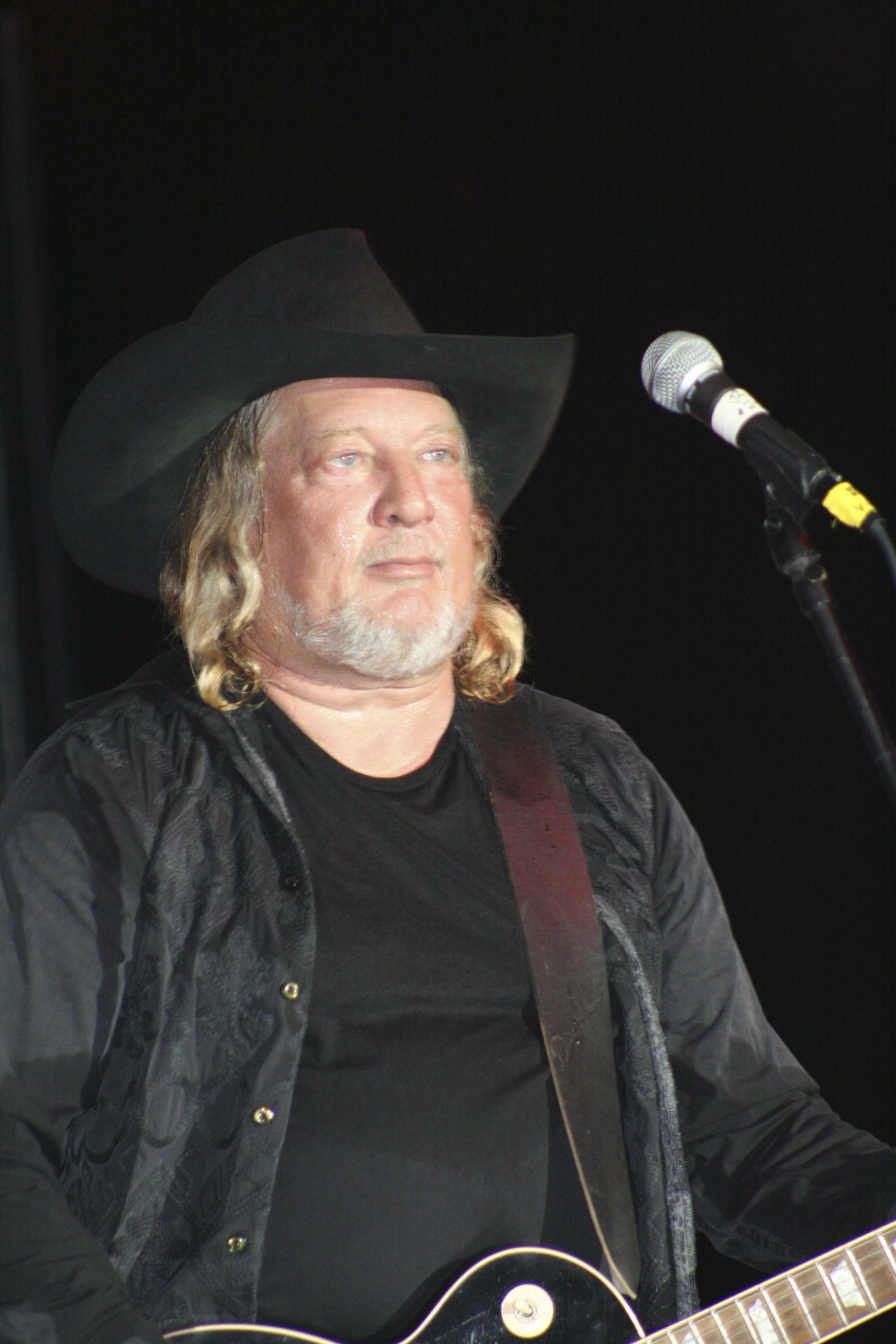
John Anderson

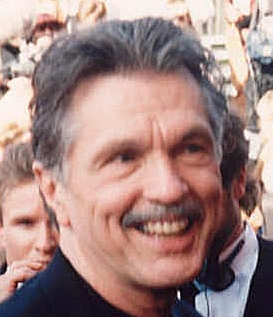
Tom Skerritt

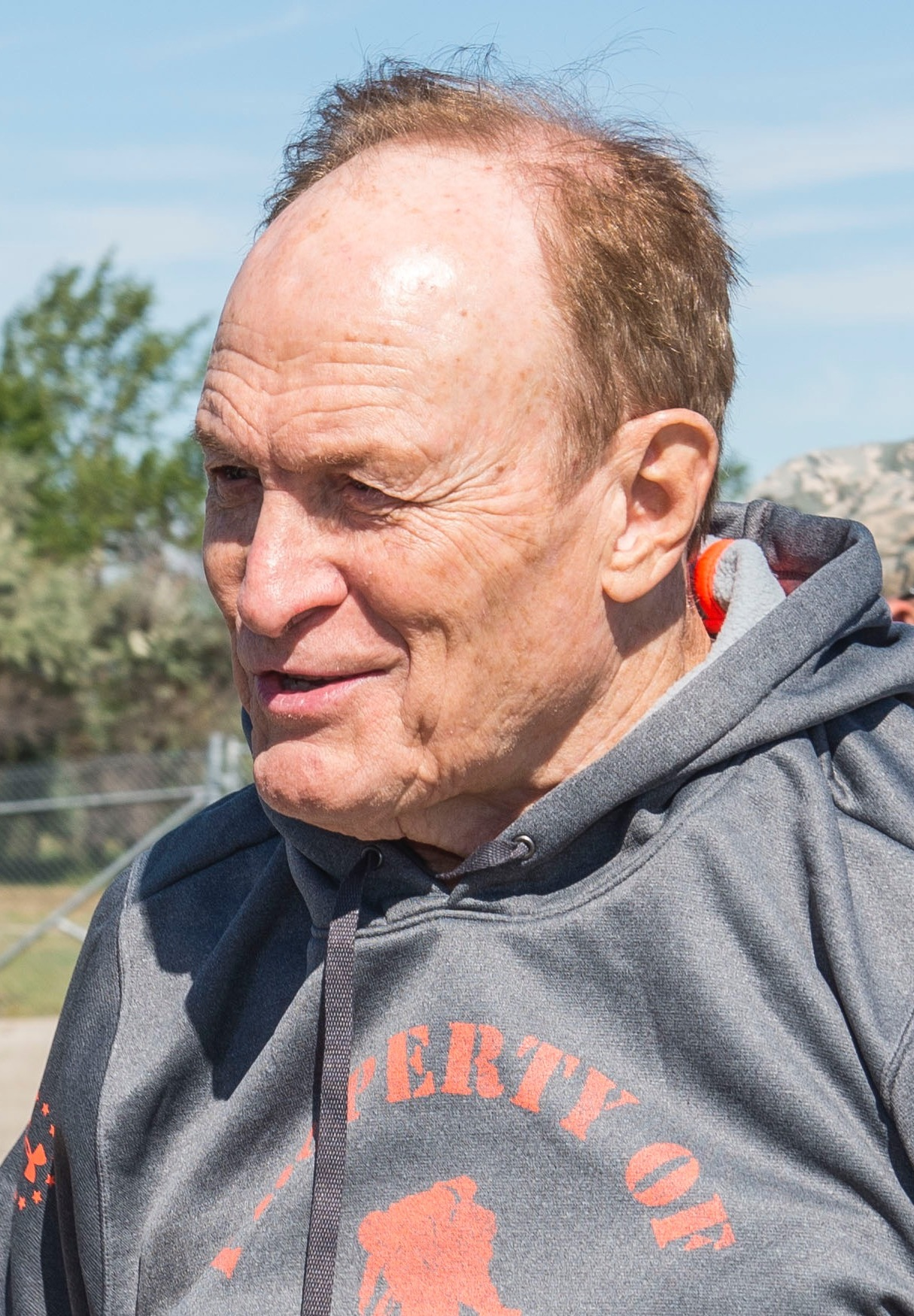
Dale Brown

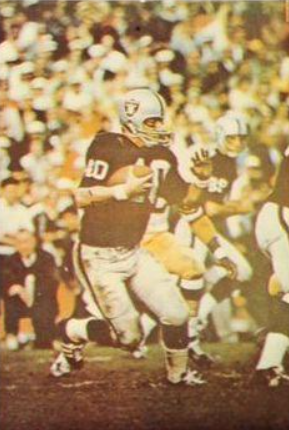
Pete Banaszak

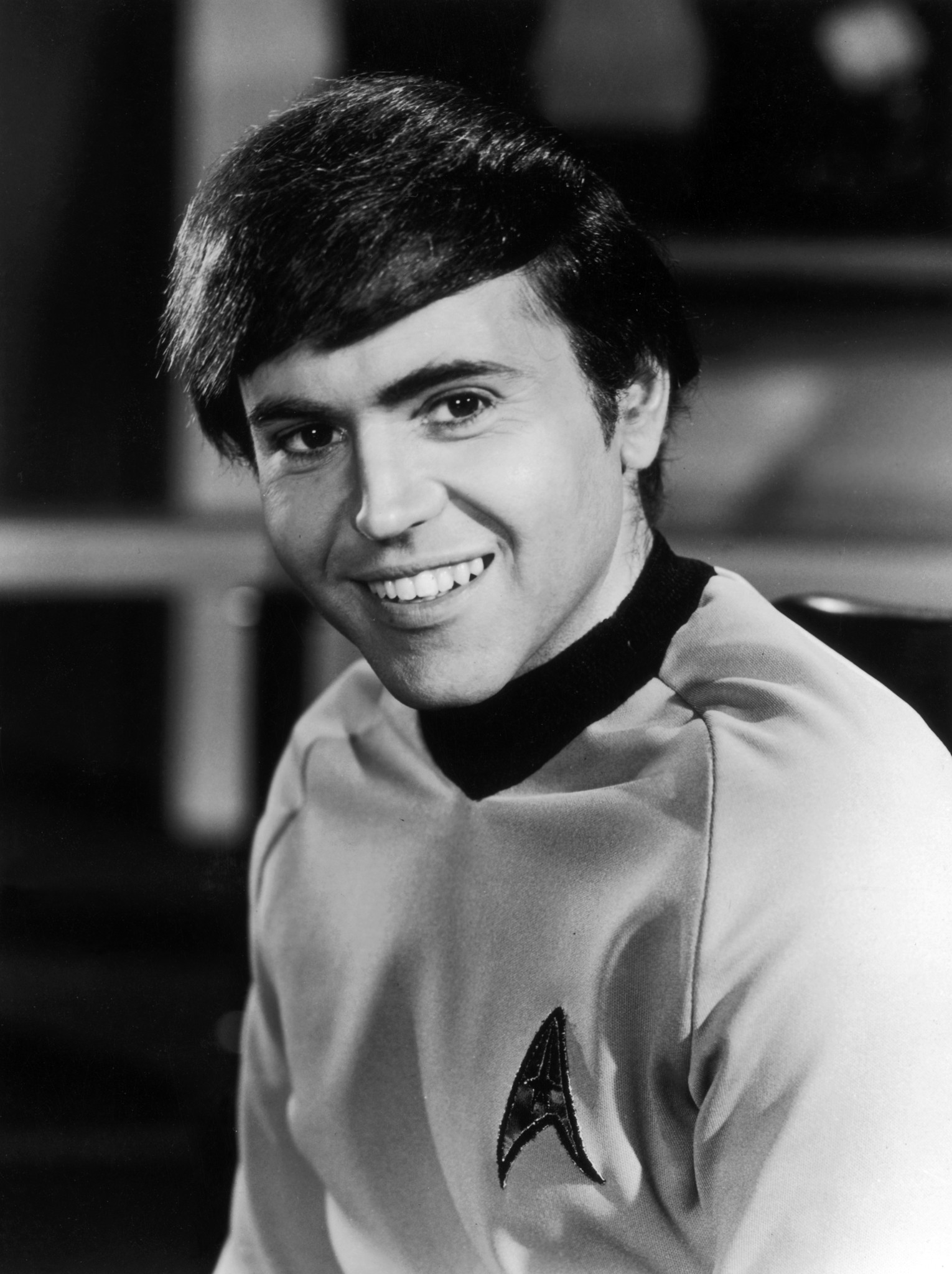
Walter Koenig

Susan Saint James

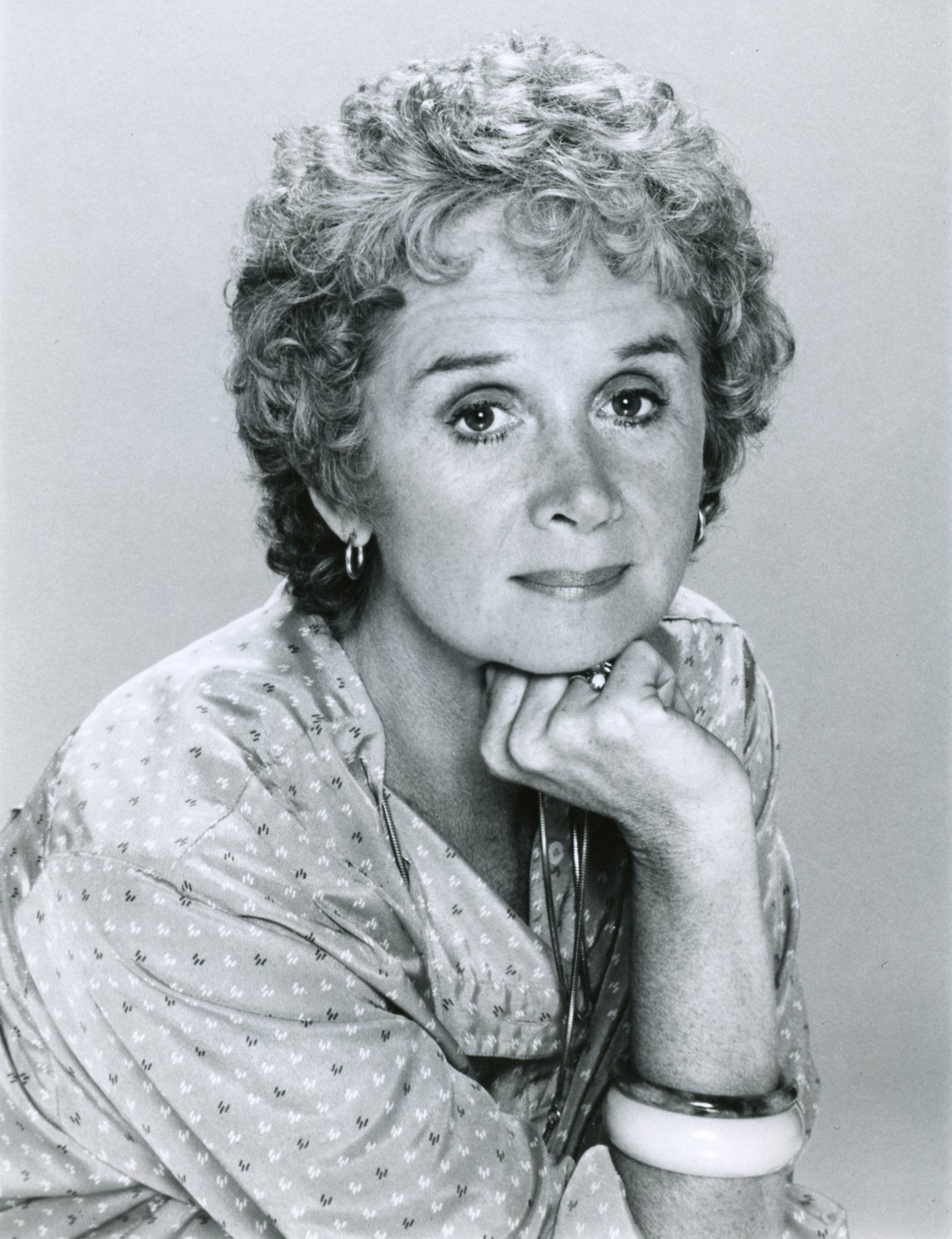
Barbara Barrie

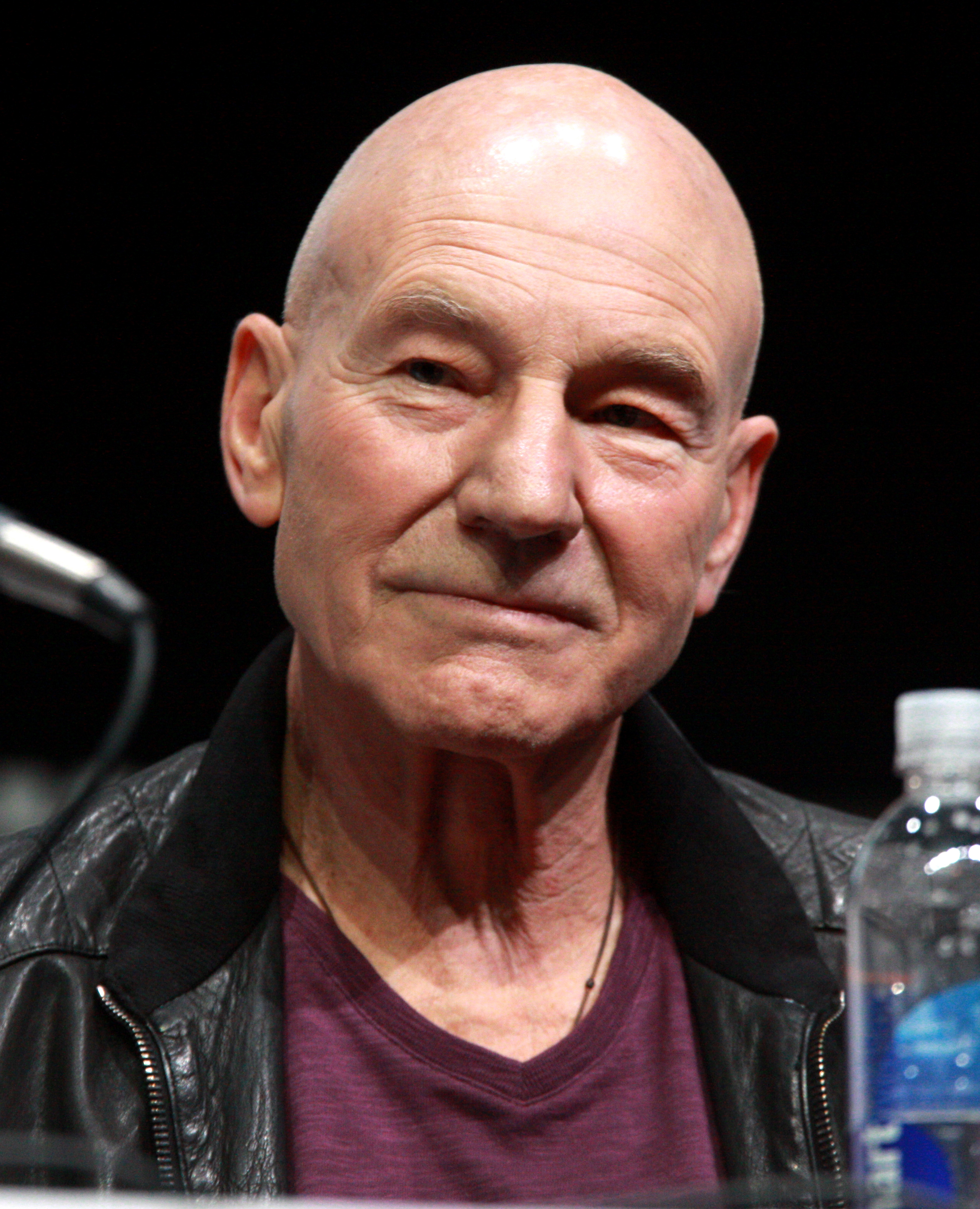
Patrick Stewart

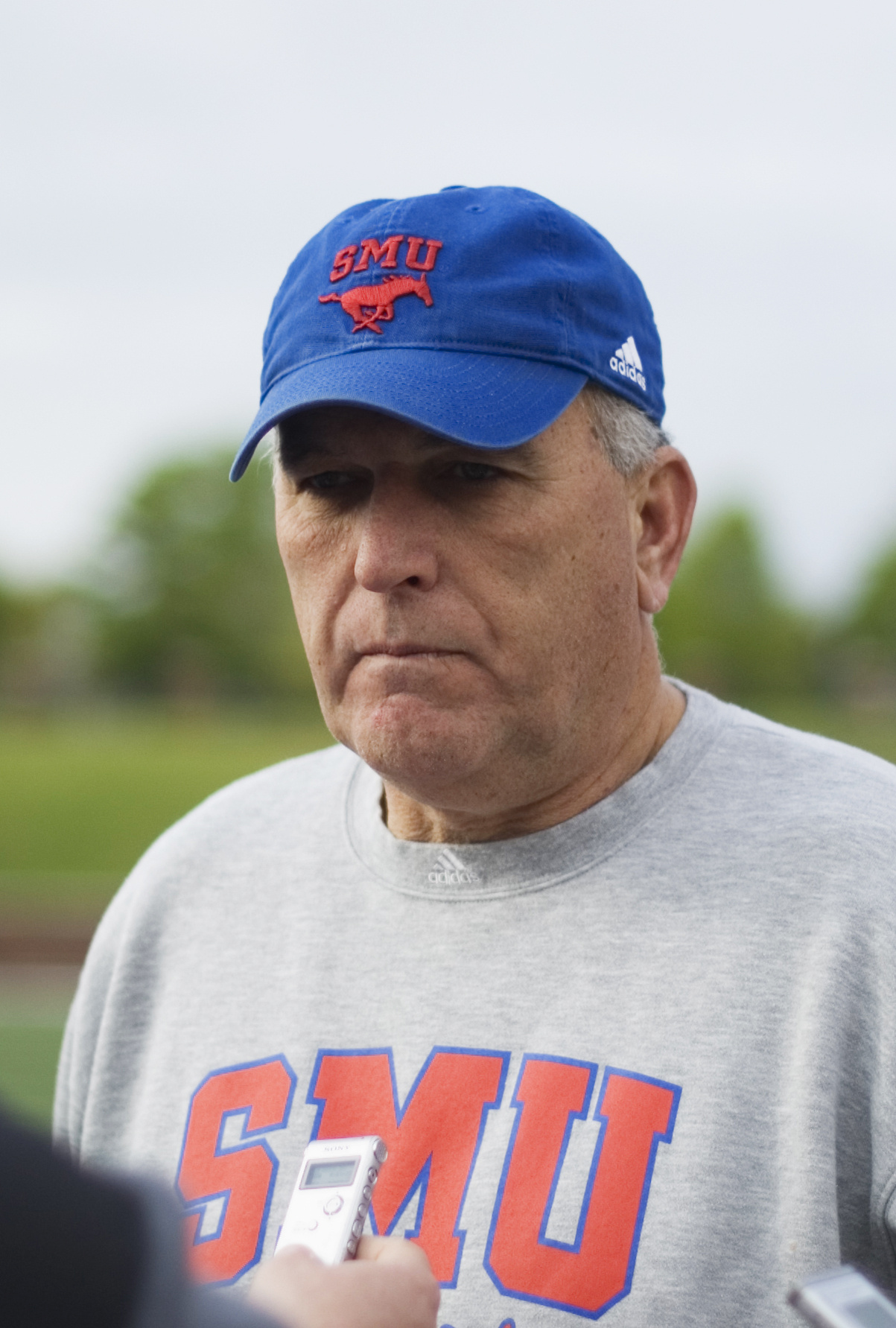
June Jones

- October 1
  - J. Todd Anderson, 67, storyboard artist (The Big Lebowski, Fargo, The Nice Guys)
  - Bart Batten, 68, professional wrestler (Batten Twins)
  - Del Casher, 88, guitarist, composer and inventor (wah-wah pedal, Ecco-Fonic)
  - Brooke Eby, 37, influencer and ALS advocate
  - Melissa Hart, 57, judge
  - Frank Mancuso Sr., 93, film executive (Paramount Pictures)
  - Mary Louise Weller, 79, actress (Animal House, Forced Vengeance, The Bell Jar)
  - Milton Windler, 94, NASA flight director (Apollo 13)
- October 2
  - Irene Butter, 95, German-born academic and Holocaust survivor
  - Duke Carlisle, 84, football player (Texas Longhorns)
  - J. C. Duncan, 97, politician, member of the South Carolina House of Representatives (1969–1972, 1975–1980)
  - Marjoe Gortner, 82, actor and evangelist
  - Clyde Kimball, 84, politician, member of the Louisiana House of Representatives (1976–1992)
  - Rodney Muñoz, 60, costume designer (Jimmy Kimmel Live!), Emmy winner (2010)
  - Matthew Posey, 68, actor (Places in the Heart, The Final, The Magnificent Seven) and director
  - Tony Reno, 52, college football player (Worcester State Lancers) and coach (Yale Bulldogs, Harvard Crimson)
  - Mac Steen, 78, football player (Florida Gators)
  - John James Sweeney, 99, politician, member of the Pennsylvania State Senate (1975–1978)
  - Jeff Van Note, 80, football player (Alabama Hawks, Atlanta Falcons)
  - Steve Zaiser, 75, politician, member of the North Dakota House of Representatives (2003–2014)
- October 3
  - Vincent M. Battle, 85–86, diplomat, ambassador to Lebanon (1994, 2001–2004) (death announced on this date)
  - Robert X. Cringely, 73, journalist (InfoWorld)
  - Bob Fontaine Jr., 73, baseball scout (Toronto Blue Jays)
  - Wendell P. Gardner, 80, judge
  - Leroy Griffith, 94, theater and strip club owner; adult film and burlesque producer
  - Dennis Hastert, 84, politician and convicted sex offender, member (1987–2007) and speaker (1999–2007) of the U.S. House of Representatives
  - Bob Hitchcock, 97, high school football coach
  - Robert Kelker-Kelly, 62, actor (Days of Our Lives, Another World, General Hospital) and aircraft pilot
  - Metal Maniac, professional wrestler (ECW)
  - Sidney Offit, 97, author
  - Jim Ray Smith, 94, football player (Cleveland Browns, Dallas Cowboys)
- October 4
  - James M. Adovasio, 82, archaeologist
  - Gordon Davis, 85, lawyer and civic leader, parks commissioner of New York City (1978–1983)
  - Reggie McFadden, 57, actor and comedian (In Living Color, Def Comedy Jam) (death announced on this date)
  - John Rudnicki, 75, engineer
  - Nelson Toburen, 87, football player (Green Bay Packers)
- October 5
  - Jim Bakker, 86, televangelist (The PTL Club)
  - Heidi Burge, 54, American basketball player (Los Angeles Sparks, Washington Mystics), subject of Double Teamed
  - Fred Claire, 91, baseball executive, general manager of the Los Angeles Dodgers (1987–1998)
  - Tom J. Dugger, 78, politician, member of the Oklahoma Senate (2016–2024)
  - Matt Howarth, 72, comic book writer and artist (Those Annoying Post Bros, Savage Henry, Star Crossed)
  - Freddie Jackson, 70, rhythm and blues singer ("You Are My Lady", "Rock Me Tonight (For Old Times Sake)")
  - Michael Kearns, 76, actor (Body Double, Days of Our Lives, Beverly Hills, 90210) and activist
  - Sam McDowell, 84, baseball player (Cleveland Indians, San Francisco Giants, New York Yankees)
  - Dennis Meyer, 76, football player (Pittsburgh Steelers) and coach (Toronto Argonauts)
  - Don Pierce, 89, Hall of Fame jockey.
  - Coke Reed, 86, mathematician
  - Calvin Schofield Jr., 93, Episcopalian bishop
  - Joseph Sciorra, 71, cultural historian
- October 6
  - Verne Allison, 90, Hall of Fame singer (The Dells)
  - Sandra Bolden Cunningham, 76, politician, member of the New Jersey Senate (2007–2024)
  - Dennis Franchione, 75, college football coach (Pittsburg State, Texas State, U of New Mexico, TCU, Alabama, Texas A&M)
  - T. Randall Lee, 64, chemist
  - James Nelligan, 97, politician, member of the U.S. House of Representatives (1981–1983)
  - German Quiles, 87, politician
  - Eva Marie Saint, 102, actress (On the Waterfront, North by Northwest, A Hatful of Rain), Oscar winner (1955)
  - Anwar Shaikh, 80, Pakistani-born heterodox economist
  - Paul Joseph Stankard, 83, glassblower
- October 7
  - Carl Abbott, 90, architect
  - Elmer A. Bietz, 92, politician, member of the South Dakota Senate (1983–1992)
  - Patricia Blevins, 72, politician, member of the Delaware Senate (1990–2017)
  - Patrick Anthony Conmy, 92, jurist, judge of the U.S. District Court for the District of North Dakota (since 1985)
  - Anny Buchstab Coury, 97, geologist
  - Frank Dewane, 76, Roman Catholic prelate, coadjutor bishop (2006–2007) and bishop (2007–2026) of Venice in Florida
  - Curtis Flowers, 56, wrongfully-imprisoned man
  - Jim Knipfel, 61, novelist
  - Theodore J. St. Antoine, 97, lawyer and academic, dean of the University of Michigan Law School (1971–1978)
- October 8
  - Bob Brynildson, 69, comic book store owner
  - Jeff Cannonball, 39, professional wrestler
  - Betty McGuire, 100, actress (Growing Pains)
  - Mark Pryor, 59, British-born author and attorney
  - Stephen A. Schuker, 87, historian
- October 9
  - Mike Ditka, 86, Hall of Fame football player and coach (Chicago Bears), Super Bowl champion (1986)
  - Jim Richards, 90, basketball coach (Western Kentucky Hilltoppers)
- October 10
  - Stephen Dow Beckham, 85, historian
  - Larry Bertlemann, 71, surfer
  - Rory Bourke, 84, songwriter and music publisher
  - Keven McDonald, 70, basketball player (Lancaster Red Roses) and lawyer
  - Michael W. Rice, 82, food company executive, chairman of Utz Brands
  - Giuseppe Schifilliti, 88, Italian-born mobster (DeCavalcante crime family)
  - Billy Ray Smith, 82, politician, Kentucky commissioner of agriculture (1996–2004)
  - Bud Zipfel, 87, baseball player (Washington Senators)
- October 11
  - Joan M. Clark, 104, diplomat, ambassador to Malta (1979–1981)
  - Grant Heiken, 84, volcanologist
  - Rachna Shroff, 47, oncologist
- October 12
  - Sheana Davis, 57, cheesemaker
  - Richard Gray, 68, video game designer (Duke Nukem 3D, Sin, Quake)
  - RJ Mitte, 34, actor (Breaking Bad, Switched at Birth, The Guardians of Justice)
  - Lucian Piane, 46, music producer ("Bale Out") and composer (RuPaul's Drag Race, Sorority Row)
- October 13
  - Martina Arroyo, 90, operatic soprano
  - Guy Conti, 84, baseball coach (New York Mets)
  - Paul Kimelman, 79, weight loss world record holder
  - Jack Kirksey, 97, politician, member of the Michigan House of Representatives (1977–1984) and mayor of Livonia (1995–2003, 2008–2015)
  - Anthony A. Less, 89, vice admiral, United States Navy
  - Alan Mandell, 98, Canadian-born actor (A Serious Man, Velvet Buzzsaw, 79 Park Avenue)
  - Perry Mehrling, 67, economist
  - Peter Nagy, 67, artist
  - Kasey Redfern, 35, football player (Detroit Lions, Atlanta Falcons, Dallas Cowboys)
  - Dorothy Saxe, 100, philanthropist and art collector
  - David Surkamp, 73, progressive rock singer, guitarist and songwriter (Pavlov's Dog)
  - Craig L. Symonds, 79, naval historian
- October 14
  - Louis Appignani, 93, philanthropist
  - Thomas H. Buxton, 86, academic
  - Michael Cremo, 78, pseudoarcheologist (Forbidden Archeology)
  - Michael Forest, 97, actor (Beast from Haunted Cave, Texhnolyze, Atlas)
  - Charmienne Harker, 102, actress (Death Valley Days, Angel Face, Abbott and Costello in the Foreign Legion)
  - Gerald Stebelton, 87, politician, member of the Ohio House of Representatives (2007–2014)
  - Rita Vorperian, 88, Syrian-born literary scholar and philanthropist, executive director of the Armenian Relief Society (1998–2005)
  - Malcolm H. Wiener, 91, prehistorian and lawyer
- October 15
  - Myron Augsburger, 97, pastor and theologian
  - Dominic J. Elioff, 95, politician, member of the Minnesota House of Representatives (1979–1987)
  - Cliff Hagan, 94, Hall of Fame basketball player (Kentucky Wildcats, St. Louis Hawks), NBA champion (1958)
  - Jon Morris, 84, football player (New England Patriots, Detroit Lions, Chicago Bears)
  - Richard Riehle, 78, actor (Office Space, Grounded for Life, The Man from Earth)
  - Gilman Shattuck, 99, politician, member of the New Hampshire House of Representatives (2005–2010, 2012–2016)
  - Tommy R. Smith, 75, politician, member of the Georgia House of Representatives (1978–2012)
- October 16
  - Noah Adams, 84, radio journalist (NPR)
  - Jack Berry, 95, sportswriter (The Detroit News)
  - Michael Gray, 75, actor (Shazam!, The Brian Keith Show, Archer)
  - Richard E. Holmes, 82, civil rights activist and medical doctor
  - P. Inman, 79, poet
  - Sam Noto, 96, jazz trumpeter
  - Joe Redner, 86, strip club owner
  - Sharon Sites Adams, 96, sailor
  - Walter J. Tomasch, 96, physicist
- October 17
  - John Beake, 87, football coach (Kansas City Chiefs, New Orleans Saints) and executive (Denver Broncos)
  - Yvette Biro, 96, Hungarian-born screenwriter (Johanna, Tender Son: The Frankenstein Project).
  - Tom DeSimone, 87, film director (Chatterbox, Hell Night, The Concrete Jungle), writer and producer
  - Samuel S. Kim, 91, political scientist and writer
  - Robert S. Knox, 95, physicist
- October 18
  - James P. Axiotis, 63, Greek-born television producer (Cold Case Files)
  - Robert Christopherson, 90, Olympic boxer (1964)
  - Mary Fell, 79, poet
  - Gary Heffern, 72, Finnish-born punk rock singer (The Penetrators). (body discovered on this date)
  - Larry Hibbard, 81, politician, member of the Kansas House of Representatives (2013–2019)
  - Ann Hornaday, 66, film critic (The Washington Post)
- October 19
  - Chuck Amato, 80, college football player (NC State) and coach (NC State, Florida State)
  - Kenneth Atchity, 82, film producer (The Meg, Life or Something Like It, Amityville 4: The Evil Escapes)
  - Alexandre Chorin, 88, Polish-born mathematician
  - Tom Daniel, 89, automobile stylist
  - Caryle Murphy, 79, journalist (The Washington Post), pulmonary fibrosis
  - Mr. Whitekeys, 79, musician
- October 20
  - Allen Bailey, 37, American football player (Kansas City Chiefs, Atlanta Falcons).
  - Sandy Frank, 97, television producer (Name That Tune, Battle of the Planets)
  - John M. Geddes, 74, American journalist and editor (The New York Times), lung disease.
  - Anita Louis, 76, singer (The Soul Children)
  - Michael Joseph Melloy, 78, jurist, judge of the Northern District of Iowa (1992–2002) and Court of Appeals for the Eighth Circuit (since 2002)
  - William Reaves, 77, American convicted murderer
  - Alex Sanders, 88, jurist, politician and academic administrator
  - Harry Tsuchidana, 94, painter
- October 21
  - John Anderson, 71, Hall of Fame country singer ("Wild and Blue") and songwriter ("Swingin'", "Seminole Wind")
  - Todd Benzinger, 63, baseball player (Boston Red Sox, Cincinnati Reds), World Series champion (1990)
  - Dan Davis, 84, radio broadcaster (ESPN)
  - Cornell Green, 86, football player (Dallas Cowboys)
  - Clint Hackney, 74, politician, member of the Texas House of Representatives (1980–1988)
  - Elena Maganini, 70, film and television editor (Dexter, Henry: Portrait of a Serial Killer, Wild Things)
  - Tom Skerritt, 93, actor (Alien, Picket Fences, M*A*S*H), Emmy winner (1993)
  - William J. Thorn, 96, football, cross country, and track coach
  - Bob "Hoolihan" Wells, 93, weatherman, media host (The Hoolihan and Big Chuck Show) and actor (Summer Rental, Ghetto Freaks)
- October 22
  - Toya Jones, 49, football player (San Francisco 49ers, Denver Broncos, Houston Texans)
  - Arvid Kramer, 70, basketball player (Anchorage Northern Knights, Denver Nuggets, Telekom Baskets Bonn)
  - Arlene Lesewski, 90, politician, member of the Minnesota Senate (1993–2002)
  - Thayer Scudder, 96, anthropologist
  - Marilyn Slaby, 86, politician, member of the Ohio House of Representatives (2004, 2012–2018)
  - Donald Wood-Smith, 95, Australian-born plastic surgeon
- October 23
  - Judith Blegen, 85, soprano
  - Dale Brown, 90, college basketball coach (LSU Tigers)
  - Mathew J. Burrows, 73, intelligence expert (death announced on this date)
  - Alan Dysert, 75, actor (All My Children)
  - Daniel Guice Jr., 73, politician, member of the Mississippi House of Representatives (1984–2008)
  - Wm. Roger Louis, 90, historian and academic
  - Lawrence McCutcheon, 76, football player (Los Angeles Rams, Denver Broncos, Seattle Seahawks).
  - Harry Shorstein, 86, lawyer
  - George Thomas, 88, baseball player (Boston Red Sox, Detroit Tigers, Los Angeles Angels)
- October 24
  - Pete Banaszak, 82, football player (Oakland Raiders)
  - Rodney J. Clifton, 89, mechanical engineer
  - Phil Vandersea, 83, football player (Green Bay Packers, New Orleans Saints, Montreal Alouettes)
- October 25
  - Jack Armstrong, 79, professional wrestler (WWWF, UWF)
  - Jumbo Baretta, 59, professional wrestler (CWF, WCW, UWF)
  - Kevin Bleyer, 54, television writer (The Daily Show, Politically Incorrect) and speechwriter (Barack Obama), four-time Emmy winner
  - Gerald Fischbach, 87, neuroscientist
  - Frank Gagliano, 89, track and field coach
  - Peggy King, 96, jazz singer and actress (Zero Hour!)
  - Walter Koenig, 90, actor (Star Trek, Babylon 5, Moontrap)
  - Ross Newhan, 89, sportswriter (Los Angeles Times, Long Beach Press-Telegram)
  - Christine Wren, 78, baseball umpire (Single-A, Northwest League)
- October 26
  - Barry Clemens, 83, basketball player (Cleveland Cavaliers, Chicago Bulls, Seattle SuperSonics)
  - Donnie Iris, 83, rock musician (The Jaggerz) and songwriter ("The Rapper", "Ah! Leah!")
  - Susan Saint James, 80, actress (McMillan & Wife, Love at First Bite, Kate & Allie)
  - Lily Wong Fillmore, 92, linguist
- October 27
  - Jim Boyd, 84, news anchor (WCVB-TV)
  - Eddie Gray, 78, guitarist (Tommy James and the Shondells)
  - Ronny Hallin, 88, television producer (Step by Step, Happy Days, Laverne & Shirley)
  - Andrew P. Iosue, 98, Air Force general
  - Stephen Kovacevich, 86, classical pianist and composer
  - Howard Lyman, 88, farmer and animal rights activist
  - Ursula von Rydingsvard, 84, German-born sculptor
  - Bobby Wright, 84, country singer and actor (McHale's Navy)
- October 28
  - Barbara Barrie, 95, actress (Suddenly Susan, Breaking Away, Hercules)
  - Tony Berlant, 85, artist
  - Alvin Hellerstein, 92, jurist, judge of the U.S. District Court for Southern New York (since 1998)
  - Dolores Huerta, 96, labor leader and activist
  - Pipo Nguyen-duy, 63–64, Vietnamese-born fine art photographer and academic (Oberlin College), shot.
  - Glynn Simmons, 72, wrongfully convicted prisoner
  - Elke Sommer, 85, German-born actress (The Prize, A Shot in the Dark, Boy, Did I Get a Wrong Number!)
  - Sir Patrick Stewart, 86, English-born actor (Star Trek: The Next Generation, X-Men, Macbeth), Grammy winner (1996)
- October 29
  - Michael P. Drazin, 97, English-born mathematician (Drazin inverse)
  - Cevin Fisher, 63, DJ and record producer
  - Dan Goddard, 78, politician, member of the Kansas Senate (2017–2021) and House of Representatives (since 2023)
  - Freddie James, 89, high school football coach (David W. Carter High School)
  - June Jones, 73, football player (Atlanta Falcons) and coach (Hawaii Rainbow Warriors, Hamilton Tiger-Cats)
  - Melvin Sephus, singer (The Rude Boys) (death announced on this date)
  - Marvin Shanken, 83, publisher (Wine Spectator, Cigar Aficionado, Whisky Advocate)
  - Bronislava Volková, 80, Czech-born poet
- October 30
  - Bill Clifton, 95, bluegrass musician and singer
  - Milton Coleman, 79, journalist (The Washington Post)
  - Robert W. Curran, 76, politician, member of the Baltimore City Council (1995–2016)
  - Don Knodel, 95, basketball coach (Rice Owls, Houston Angels)
  - William Nordhaus, 85, American economist, Nobel Prize laureate (2018)
  - Doug Woolard, 76, college athletics director (Saint Louis Billikens, South Florida Bulls)
  - Matthew Wright, 52, television producer (The Ellen DeGeneres Show)
- October 31
  - Juan Atkins, 64, record producer ("No UFO's"), techno musician (The Belleville Three, Cybotron), and DJ
  - Dan Doornink, 70, football player (New York Giants, Seattle Seahawks)
  - Martin Erlichman, 97, talent manager
  - Marcia Ann Gillespie, 82, magazine editor (Essence, Ms.) and activist (death announced on this date)
  - Bob Heinz, 79, football player (Miami Dolphins, Washington Redskins)
  - Larry Kristoff, 83, Olympic wrestler (1964, 1968)

== November ==
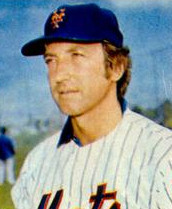
Jerry Koosman

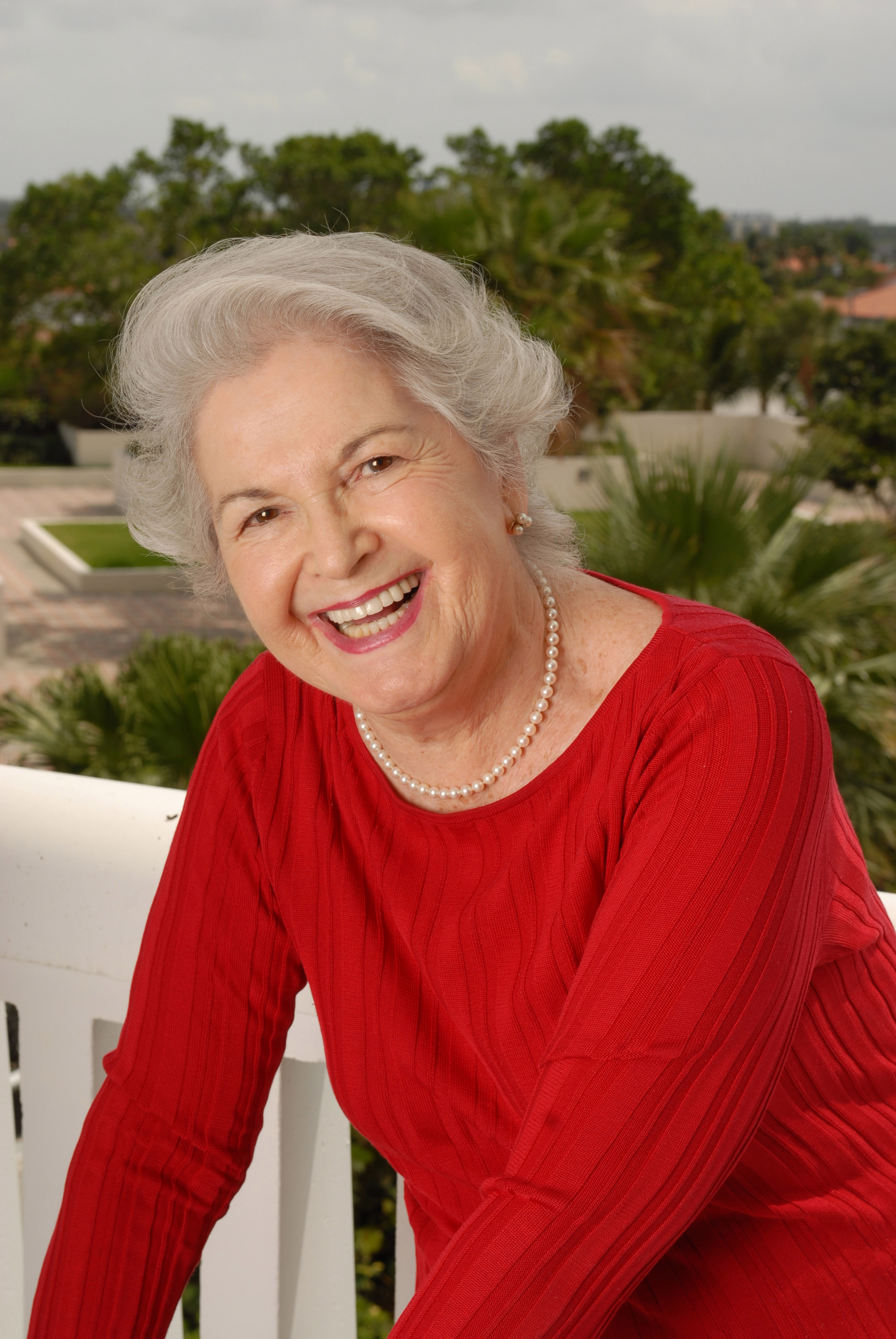
Aranka Siegal

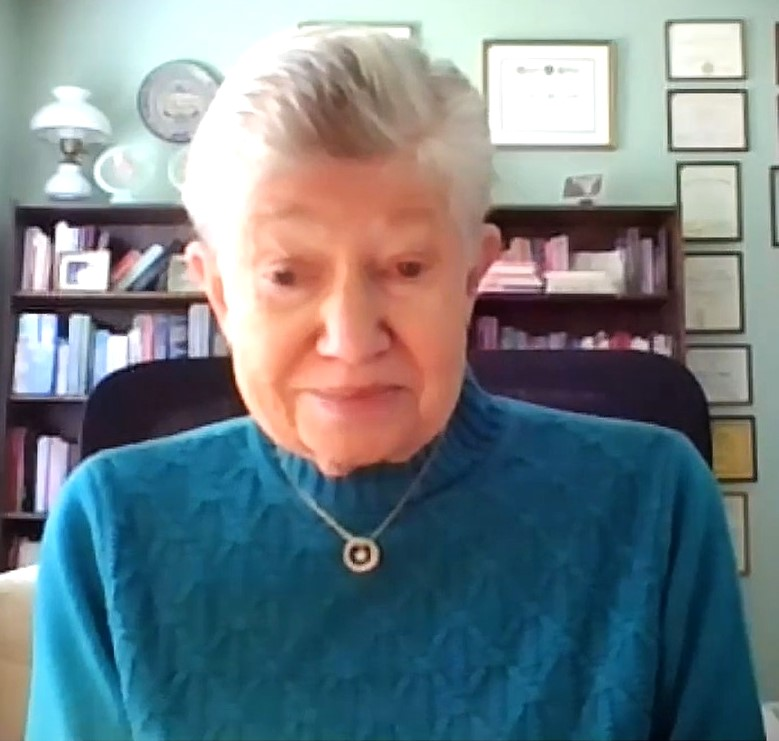
Beverly Whipple

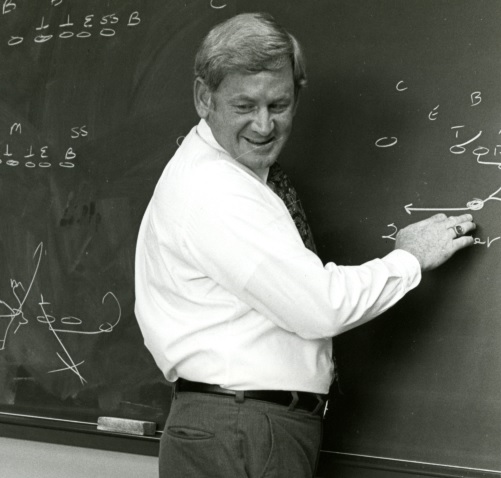
Ray Alborn

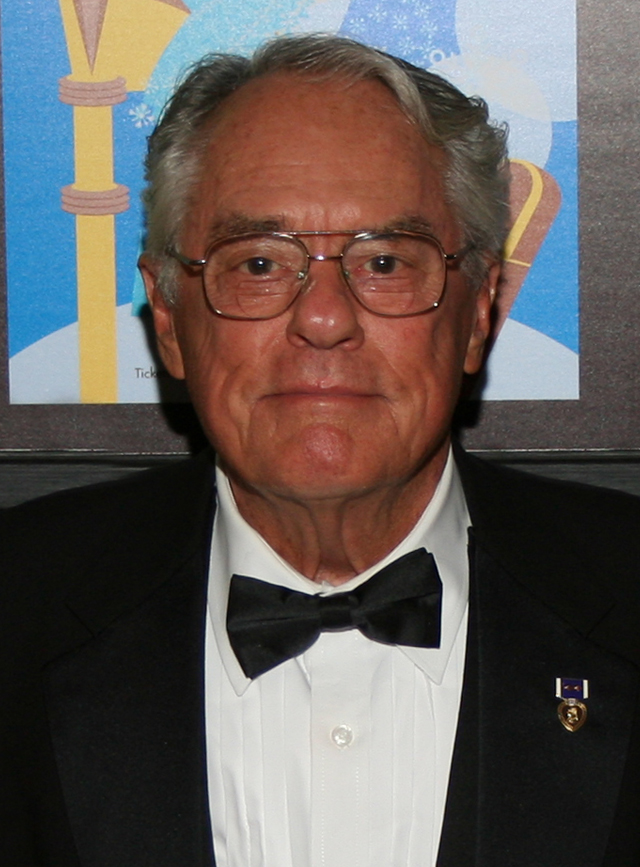
Donnie Dunagan

Kimmarie Johnson

Jay Rockefeller

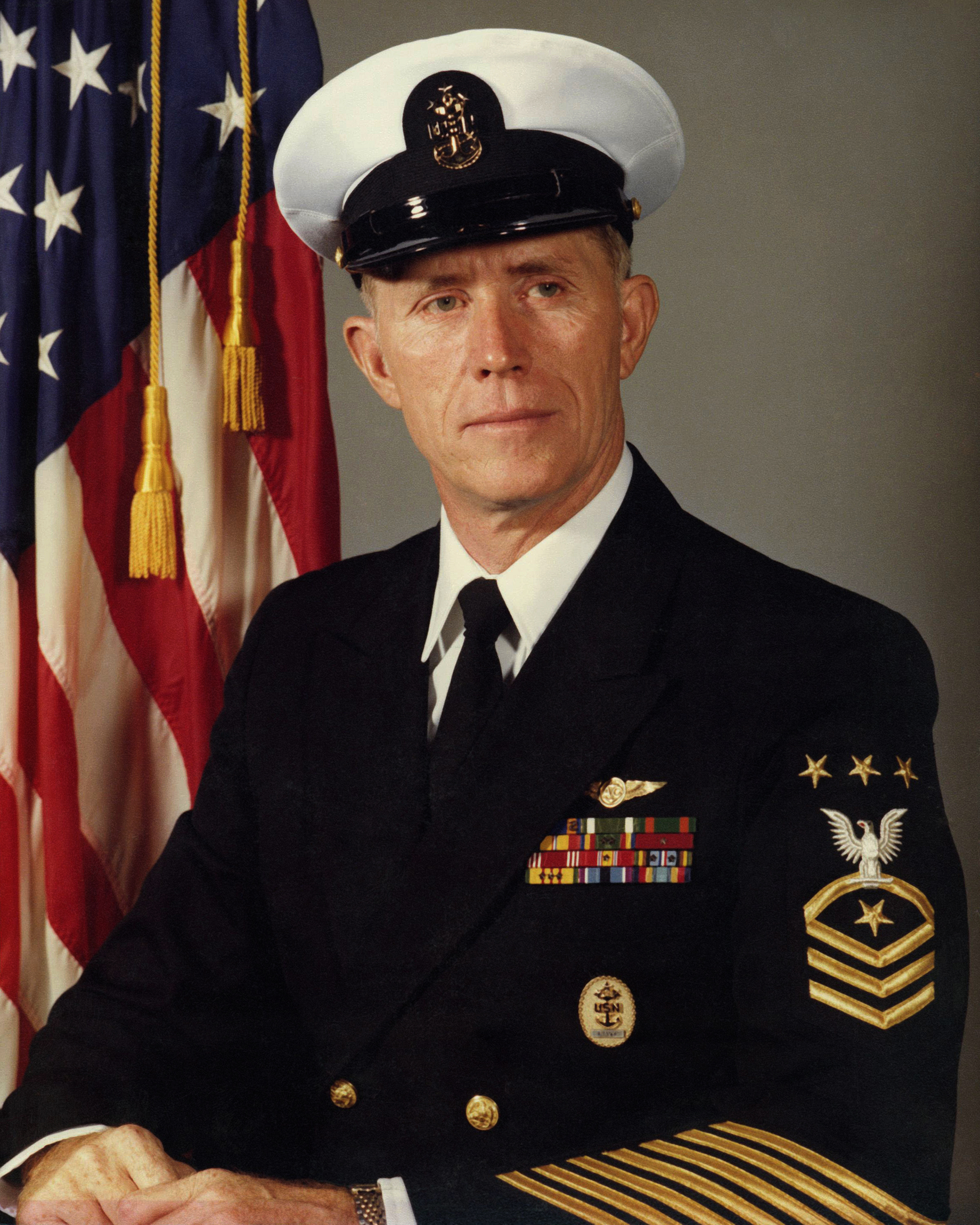
Billy C. Sanders

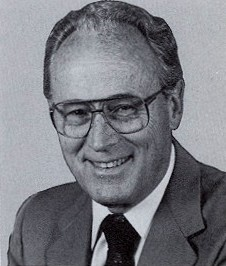
G. William Whitehurst

Bob Boone

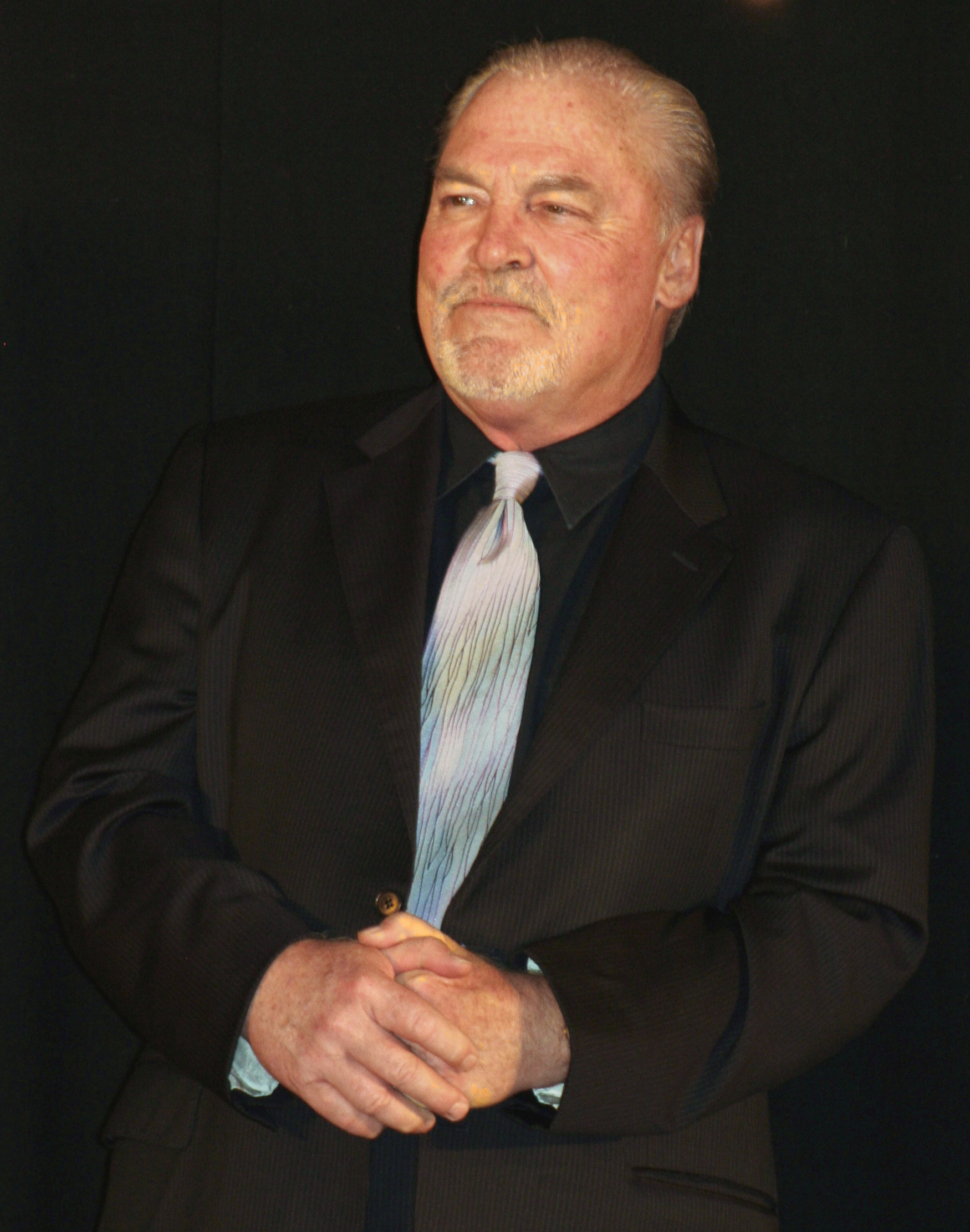
Stacy Keach

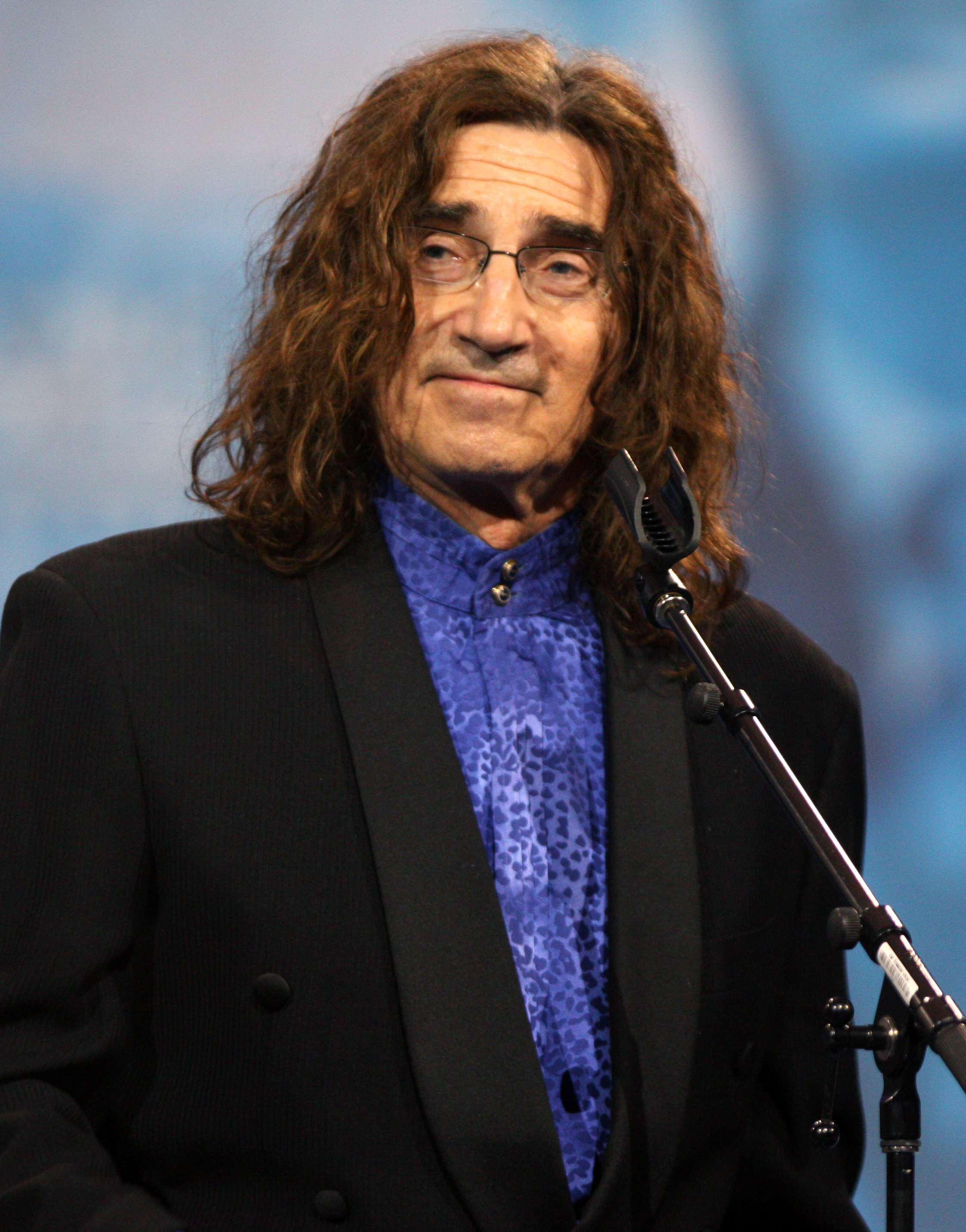
Richard Sterban

- November 1
  - Al Barkow, 93, golf journalist and historian
  - Tony Butala, 87, singer (The Lettermen)
  - Ellis Johnson, 83, American football player (Boston Patriots).
  - Jerry Koosman, 83, baseball player (New York Mets, Minnesota Twins, Chicago White Sox), World Series champion (1969)
  - Frank Howell Seay, 88, jurist, judge (since 1979) and chief judge (1980–1996) of the U.S. District Court for the Eastern District of Oklahoma
  - Todd Shell, 64, American football player (San Francisco 49ers) and coach.
- November 2
  - Taurian Fontenette, 43, basketball player
  - Capers Funnye, 74, rabbi
  - John Killacky, 74, politician, member of the Vermont House of Representatives (2019–2022)
  - Aranka Siegal, 96, Ukrainian-born Holocaust survivor and writer (Upon the Head of the Goat)
  - Lonnie Thompson, 78, paleoclimatologist
  - Beverly Whipple, 85, sexologist and professor (The G Spot and Other Recent Discoveries About Human Sexuality)
- November 3
  - June Carpenter, 88, Shaker
  - Harold Greene, 82, news anchor
  - Herman Morse, 77, politician, member of the Missouri House of Representatives (2017–2025)
  - John Nicks, 97, British-born pair skater and figure skating coach
  - Peggy Rathmann, 73, illustrator and author
  - Dulcy Singer, 92, television producer (Sesame Street), Emmy Award winner (1979)
  - Simon Winchester, 82, British-born author (The Surgeon of Crowthorne)
- November 4
  - Ray Alborn, 87, football coach (Rice Owls)
  - Ronald D. Castille, 82, judge, justice of the Supreme Court of Pennsylvania (1994–2014)
  - Steve Davidson, 67, science fiction editor
  - David Del Valle, 77, film historian
  - Donnie Dunagan, 92, actor (Bambi, Son of Frankenstein, Tower of London) and Marine Corps major
  - Tom Jensen, 77, politician, member of the Kentucky House of Representatives (1985–1987, 1989–1997) and Senate (2005–2012)
  - Kimmarie Johnson, 50, actress (The Summer of Massacre) and model, complications from a heart aneurysm
  - Billy Martindale, 88, golfer
  - Nicolas P. Retsinas, 79, economist
  - Toukie Smith, 74, actress (227, I Like It Like That, Miami Vice) and model
- November 5
  - Allen Ballard, 96, author and academic
  - Julian A. Brodsky, 93, mass media executive, founder of Comcast
  - John Prausnitz, 98, chemical engineer
  - Jeffrey Weisheit, 50, convicted murderer
- November 6
  - T. Cullen Davis, 93, oil tycoon and murder suspect
  - Robert Parmet, 87, author and academic
  - Ben Reyes, 79, politician, member of the Texas House of Representatives (1973–1980) and Houston City Council (1980–1996) (death announced on this date)
  - Jay Rockefeller, 89, politician, governor of West Virginia (1977–1985) and U.S. senator (1985–2015)
  - Billy C. Sanders, 90, master chief petty officer of the Navy (1982–1985)
- November 7
  - Mike Carter, 71, American-Israeli basketball player (Hapoel Holon B.C., Hapoel Jerusalem B.C, Maccabi Ramat Gan B.C.)
  - Gary Fisketjon, 72, book editor
  - Richard Lloyd, 75, guitarist (Television, Rocket from the Tombs)
  - Blanche Martin, 87, football player (Los Angeles Chargers, New York Titans)
  - Bobby Sheehan, 78, ice hockey player (Montreal Canadiens, Chicago Blackhawks, New York Rangers)
  - G. William Whitehurst, 101, politician, member of the U.S. House of Representatives (1969–1987)
- November 8
  - Engin Deniz Akarlı, 81, Turkish-born historian
  - Hubert Ausbie, 88, basketball player (Harlem Globetrotters)
  - Skip Hinnant, 86, actor (Fritz the Cat, The Electric Company, The Easter Bunny Is Comin' to Town)
- November 9
  - Bob Boone, 78, baseball player (Philadelphia Phillies, California Angels) and manager (Kansas City Royals), World Series champion (1980)
  - David Bratman, 69, librarian and Tolkien scholar
  - Ronald Canestrari, 83, politician, member of the New York State Assembly (1989–2012)
  - Mike Friedman, college football coach (CSU Pueblo ThunderWolves)
  - Bob Mills, 79, furniture store executive
  - Rita Paul, 99, visual artist and hotel owner (Washington Square Hotel)
  - Roger Sippl, 71, American software developer (Informix Corporation). (death announced on this date)
- November 10
  - Anthony Clark, 62, comedian and actor (Yes, Dear, Boston Common, The Rock)
  - Irma P. Hall, 91, actress (The Ladykillers, Midnight in the Garden of Good and Evil, Soul Food)
  - Jim Herd, 87, television production executive and professional wrestling executive (death announced on this date)
  - Stacy Keach, 85, actor (Fat City, Mickey Spillane's Mike Hammer, American History X)
  - Marsha M. Linehan, 83, psychologist
  - Sid Morrison, 93, politician, member of the U.S. House of Representatives (1981–1993) and Washington secretary of transportation (1993–2001)
  - Kevin Murray, 66, politician, member of the California State Assembly (1994–1998) and Senate (1998–2006)
  - Richard Posner, 87, legal scholar and judge, judge (1981–2017) and chief judge (1993–2000) of the U.S. Court of Appeals for the Seventh Circuit
  - Ray Tintori, 43, music video director ("Kids", "Electric Feel", "Spaceman")
- November 11
  - Steve Camp, 71, singer
  - F. A. Dry, 95, college football player (Oklahoma State Cowboys) and coach (Tulsa Golden Hurricane, TCU Horned Frogs)
  - Dan Hicks, 64, sportscaster (NBC Sports)
  - Dick Hoak, 86, football player and coach (Pittsburgh Steelers)
  - Tony Richards, 69, drummer (W.A.S.P) (death announced on this date)
- November 12
  - Michael Bayham, 52, politician, member of the Louisiana House of Representatives (since 2024)
  - Pierre Bellocq, 99, French-born cartoonist
  - Jim McDermott, 89, politician, member of the U.S. House of Representatives (1989–2017)
  - James Pavatt, 73, convicted murderer (murder of Rob Andrew)
  - John Allen Rubio, 46, convicted murderer (2003 Brownsville child murders)
  - Eldon Stroburg, 99, politician, member of the Iowa House of Representatives (1969–1971)
  - Brian Tracy, 82, Canadian-born motivational speaker
- November 13
  - Dan Carney, 95, business executive, co-founder of Pizza Hut
  - Jesse Mashburn, 93, track and field racer, Olympic champion (1956)
  - John Reilly, 68, politician, member of the Michigan House of Representatives (2017–2023)
- November 14
  - Bob Allen, 81, politician, member of the Pennsylvania House of Representatives (1989–2006)
  - Bob Hoskins, 90, Christian missionary, founder of OneHope
  - Ken Sanders, 85, baseball player (Milwaukee Brewers, New York Mets, Cleveland Indians)
  - Richard Sterban, 83, singer (The Oak Ridge Boys)
  - Mike Wise, 62, sports columnist (ESPN)
- November 15
  - John Christ, 61, musician (Danzig, Samhain)
  - Tim Holden, 69, politician, member of the U.S. House of Representatives (1993–2013)
  - Diana Johnstone, 92, political writer
  - Ken St. Andre, 79, game designer (Tunnels & Trolls, Wasteland)
- November 16
  - Vinny Chase, 40, rapper
- November 17
  - Lance Broadway, 43, baseball player (Chicago White Sox, New York Mets) and actor (Olympus Has Fallen)
  - Dixie L. Leavitt, 97, politician, member of the Utah House of Representatives (1963–1964) and Senate (1965–1976, 1989–1992)
  - Fred B. Mitchell, 78, sportswriter (Chicago Tribune)
  - Eric S. Rubin, 65, diplomat, ambassador to Bulgaria (2016–2019)
  - Reed Waller, 77, comic book writer and artist ("Omaha" the Cat Dancer).
  - Bill Watts, 87, professional wrestler
- November 18
  - Larry Poindexter, 66, actor (S.W.A.T., Days of Our Lives, The Hard Times of RJ Berger)

== See also ==
- 2026 deaths in the United Kingdom
