= Tony Zappone =

American journalist (1947–2026)

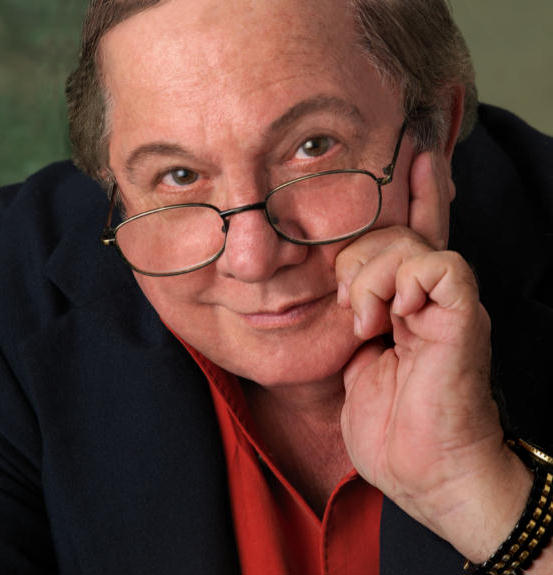
- Born: Anthony Nicholas Zappone; October 9, 1947; Tampa, Florida, U.S.
- Died: May 15, 2026 (aged 78)
- Occupations: Author; newspaper, radio and television news correspondent; real estate consultant

Anthony Nicholas Zappone (October 9, 1947 – May 15, 2026) was an American journalist and radio personality. He became at age 16 the youngest credentialed journalist to lend press coverage to a major national political convention. Zappone was also the youngest contributor of evidence (his photographs) during the Warren Commission hearings into the assassination of President John F. Kennedy. He began his career in journalism at age 14 as a freelance photographer with The Tampa Tribune, now the Tampa Bay Times, paid at the rate of three dollars per news photo used.

== Photographed JFK days before assassination ==
Zappone photographed President John F. Kennedy during his entire five-hour presidential visit to Tampa just four days before Kennedy's November 22, 1963 assassination in Dallas, Texas. Nine months later, he presented the slain President's brother, U.S. Attorney General Robert F. Kennedy, with pictures he had taken that day which were accepted for public display at the John F. Kennedy Library in Boston. The presentation took place at Kennedy's U.S. Justice Department office in Washington. (Almost 40 years later, the building was renamed the Robert F. Kennedy Department of Justice Building.)

At that time, the Kennedy presidential library was still in the planning stages so the attorney general said he would ensure the photographs would be held with other exhibits and materials until it was constructed. A selection of his photographs are now on permanent display at the Kennedy Presidential Library and Museum in Boston.

Several of the photos Zappone took that day showing the last time Secret Service agents were posted at the rear of the presidential limousine were entered as exhibits during The Warren Commission's investigation into the Kennedy Assassination and are still used today in Secret Service training. According to Secret Service records, Kennedy's Tampa visit was also remarkable in that he was exposed to the public for the second longest period of time of any appearance during his entire Presidency, the longest being his visit to West Berlin, Germany on June 26, 1963.

A week after the presentation of photos, Zappone was the youngest credentialed photographer to cover the 1964 Democratic National Convention at the original Atlantic City Convention Center (now Boardwalk Hall), having been granted an "All Areas" pass. Each evening he would take his film to the main Atlantic City post office and express mail it to newspapers in Tampa. During the convention, he was interviewed before a nationwide television audience by NBC News Correspondents John Chancellor and Frank McGee. He also caught up with Robert Kennedy once again at a rear exit following the attorney general's famous speech before an enthusiastic convention audience that gave him a 22-minute ovation.

In October 2013, Zappone published a book of photos he took during Kennedy's Tampa trip as well as a detailed narrative of his experience with the President during his visit. Its title is: "John F. Kennedy - An Amazing Day for a President and a Kid with His Camera." The publishing date was in observance of the 50th anniversary of JFK's trip and five-hour stay in Tampa. Portions of the book have been reprinted in newspapers and magazines all over the world.

One of Zappone's close-ups of Kennedy, which coincidentally was his brother Robert's favorite of those Zappone took, is etched in a historical marker that was placed in downtown Tampa at Kennedy Boulevard and Franklin Street. Zappone recalled his observations of the Presidential limousine making its turn at that intersection during the dedication of the marker, sponsored by the Tampa Historical Society, held on November 22, 2013.

== Speeding chimpanzee cited ==
Late in 1963, Zappone was monitoring local police frequencies and overheard a Florida Highway Patrolman requesting a sergeant after he pulled over a chimpanzee driving a compact convertible for speeding on Interstate 4 just east of Tampa. He rushed to grab a ride with another newsman, WTVT TV reporter Steve Wilson, and arrived in time to photograph the lawman issuing the chimp, named "Cappy," a citation for speeding, reckless driving and having no driver's license. Robert Slover, owner of then Tampa-based Southern Amusement Enterprises, a traveling carnival featuring the driving "Cappy," had installed a separate brake on the passenger's side of the vehicle and was present at the time the citation was given. The highway patrolman on the scene advised his superiors there was only one steering wheel and it was in front of the chimpanzee.

Subsequently, charges against "Cappy" the chimp were dropped after a Hillsborough County judge ruled no infraction had occurred because at that time there was no requirement in Florida law that chimpanzees have licenses to drive. Zappone was later commissioned by NBC Productions, Inc. to shoot film footage of Cappy driving around the Tampa area for later use on that network's The Tonight Show Starring Johnny Carson. During the shoot, Zappone was injured when the animal bit unrelentingly into his right hand during a stop at a downtown Tampa intersection and refused to let go until the light turned green 30 seconds later.

During a session of the Florida Legislature, convened the following year, a law was passed prohibiting non-humans from operating mechanical vehicles on all streets and highways within the entire state. The law did not provide for drivers' licenses for any type of animals.

== A Career in television news ==
At age 17, after a brief stint as junior news hound for Tampa's then CBS affiliate WTVT-TV using a borrowed, spring-wound, World War II era Bell and Howell 16 mm camera, he began shooting news film for Tampa television station WFLA-TV. At that time (1965), the going rate paid to freelancers by TV news departments was fifty cents per foot of film used on a newscast (eighteen feet equaled the average 30-second story.) After 12 years at WFLA-TV, an NBC affiliate, he would return to WTVT-TV as a news correspondent.

On April 4, 1966, he was dismissed from college classes because the electricity went out suddenly. Learning from his car radio that a devastating tornado had ripped through the Carrollwood section of North Tampa minutes earlier, Zappone rushed to the scene and became the first newsman with photos and news film of the extensive damage. His exposed 16 mm motion picture film was put on a plane bound for New York City, where it was processed at the NBC News headquarters. The dramatic images of crumbled homes, uprooted trees, mangled cars and other storm aftermath were broadcast that evening on NBC's Huntley-Brinkley Report, the highest-rated evening news program of that time.

During the late 60's and early 70's, Zappone (while in his early 20s) was a frequent contributor to NBC Radio's weekend Monitor program. Once he gained the confidence of the show's producers, the network began calling on him to create and submit feature stories for the legendary weekend radio showcase and to cover central Florida hard news stories for Monitor's "News on the Hour." He also submitted stories from the United Kingdom and other parts of Europe while stationed there in the military, 1970-71.

During summer vacations from his studies in political science and mass communications at The University of South Florida Zappone worked as a reporter/photographer with The Philadelphia Bulletin. He was a founding staff member (photographer and reporter) of The Oracle, the groundbreaking University of South Florida campus newspaper which printed its first issue September 6, 1966. In its first year, the publication won two National Pacemaker Awards given by the Associated Collegiate Press (ACP) for excellence in college journalism and was named to the ACP Hall of Fame in 1989.

In his second year of college, he joined the staff of The Tampa Tribune and The Tampa Times as a full-time reporter and photographer. Concurrently, he attended college classes full-time and was an active staff member of The Oracle as well until he graduated in 1969.

== Vietnam era military service ==
During late 1969 and early in 1970 (a part of the Vietnam War era) while in military training at Pensacola, Florida, Zappone was a part-time news and feature photographer for the Pensacola News and the Pensacola Journal (now combined as the Pensacola News Journal) under special arrangement. From 1970-71, Zappone served in the U.S. Navy as part of the Armed Forces Courier Service (ARFCOS), now the Defense Courier Service (DCS). He was assigned to the Defense Attaché section, Embassy of the United States in London, and the U.S. Naval Forces Europe command in Naples, Italy.

In London, he befriended then U.S. Ambassador to the United Kingdom Walter H. Annenberg, founder of TV Guide and former owner of The Philadelphia Inquirer and the Philadelphia Daily News, who became interested in his future career and cleared a path for opportunities in the print and broadcast journalism fields. Zappone also performed functions in Europe during this time for the National Security Agency, headquartered in Fort George G. Meade, Maryland.

While in Europe, he was a contributor to NBC News programs, The Guardian (formerly the Manchester Guardian) and The Observer newspapers, both based in London, and the European editions of Life magazine in a freelance capacity. He was also editor-in-chief of The Tartan Log, a newspaper chronicling the non-classified activities of personnel stationed at U.S. military intelligence installations in Scotland.

== Later career ==
Early in 1974, the general manager of WFLA (AM) Radio assigned him to be the station's first morning and afternoon drive-time traffic reporter and field news correspondent. His morning shift put him on air alongside legendary Tampa radio personality Jack Harris. Using police monitors, a citizens' band radio and making frequent calls to law enforcement agencies, Zappone broadcast his "rush hour" reports from a section of the radio studio, then called "WFLA Traffic Central."

Zappone was subsequently involved in radio and television commercial production, real estate acquisition and management, charitable fundraising, publishing and Internet business ventures.

== Personal life and death ==
On November 10, 2017, Zappone suffered a nearly-fatal stroke while going down stairs at his home and, after months of hospitalization, he was confined to his residence unable to walk. In latter 2018 he once again became active in the commercial real estate business and began production of a children's television program despite his being unable to walk without the aid of a walker or wheelchair.

Zappone died after a long illness on May 15, 2026, at the age of 78.

== Sources ==
- JFK, As I Remember Him
