= AOSD =

AOSD can refer to:

- Adult-onset Still's disease
- Aspect-oriented software development
- Army Operations Security Detachment, a subordinate unit of the United States Army 902nd Military Intelligence Group
