= Fort Meade =

United States Army installation

Fort George G. Meade
- Near Fort Meade, Maryland in United States
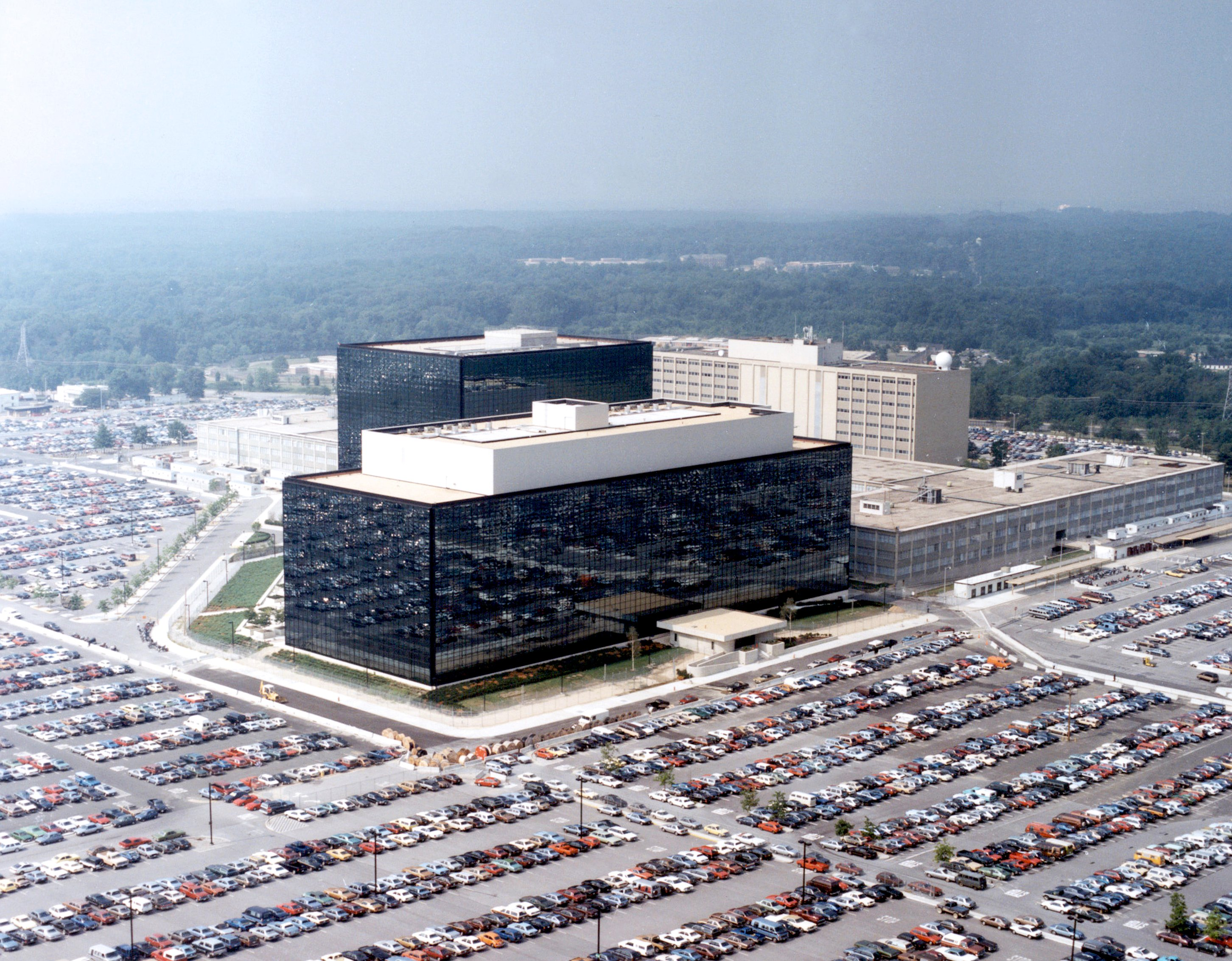
- The National Security Agency headquarters building, a major tenant at Fort George G. Meade

Site information
- Type: US Army installation
- Owner: Department of Defense
- Operator: US Army
- Controlled by: US Army Installation Management Command (IMCOM)
- Condition: Operational
- Website: Official website

Location
- Location in Maryland Location in United States
- Coordinates: 39°6′25″N 76°44′35″W
- Area: 5,067 acres (2,051 hectares)

Site history
- Built: 1917
- In use: 1917–present

Garrison information
- Current commander: Colonel Yolanda D. Gore

Fort George G. Meade is a United States Army installation located in Maryland, that includes the Defense Information School, the Defense Media Activity, the United States Army Field Band, and the headquarters of United States Cyber Command, the National Security Agency, the Defense Courier Service, Defense Information Systems Agency headquarters, and the U.S. Navy's Cryptologic Warfare Group Six. It is named for George G. Meade, a Union general from the American Civil War, who served as commander of the Army of the Potomac. The fort's smaller census-designated place includes support facilities such as schools, housing, and the offices of the Military Intelligence Civilian Excepted Career Program (MICECP).

== History ==
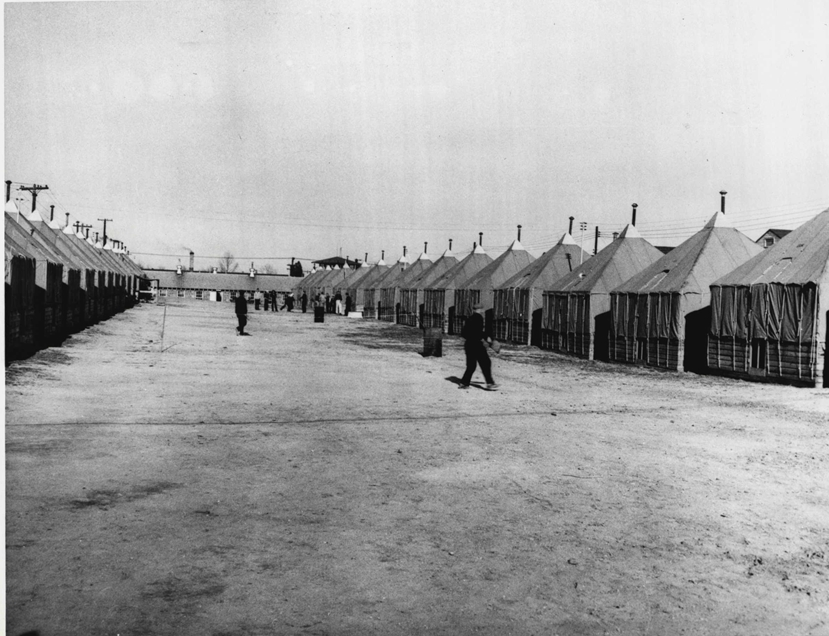
A prisoner of war (POW) camp at Fort Meade in 1942 during World War II

=== 20th century ===
Initially called Camp Annapolis Junction, the post was opened as "Camp Admiral" in 1917 on 29.7 sq mi (77 km^{2}) acquired for a training camp. The post was called Camp Meade Cantonment by 1918, During the First World War, the garrison included the 154th Depot Brigade, which was commanded for part of the conflict by Brigadier General Tyree R. Rivers. (Note: Depot brigades located at several posts throughout the United States were responsible during the war for receiving, equipping, and training recruits prior to their departure for the front lines. After the war, depot brigades carried out demobilization activities for returning soldiers prior to discharging them.)

Camp Franklin Signal Corps school was located there and in 1919, the Camp Benning tank school—formed from the World War I Camp Colt and Tobyhanna schools—was transferred to the fort before the Tank Corps was disbanded.

Renamed to Fort Leonard Wood (February 1928 – March 5, 1929), the fort's Experimental Motorized Forces in the summer and fall of 1928 tested vehicles and tactics in expedition convoys (Camp Meade observers had joined the in-progress 1919 Motor Transport Corps convoy). In 1929, the fort's 1st Tank Regiment encamped on the Gettysburg Battlefield.

During World War II, Fort Meade was used as a recruit training post and prisoner of war camp, in addition to a holding center for approximately 384 Japanese, German, and Italian immigrant residents of the U.S. arrested as potential fifth columnists. The Second U.S. Army Headquarters transferred to the post on June 15, 1947; and in 1957, the post became headquarters of the National Security Agency.

==== Cold War air defense ====
From the 1950s until the 1970s, the Fort Meade radar station had various radar equipment and control systems for air defense, such as the 1st Martin AN/FSG-I Antiaircraft Defense System. Fort Meade also had the first Nike Ajax surface-to-air missiles in December 1953 (operational May 1954) and an accidental firing occurred in 1955 with Battery C, 36th AAA Missile Battalion. In 1962, the Army's Headquarters and Headquarters Battery, 13th Air Defense Artillery Group, transferred from Meade to Homestead AFB for initial deployment of MIM-23 Hawk missiles, and during the Cuban Missile Crisis, the 6th Battalion (HAWK), 65th Artillery at Fort Meade (a United States Strike Command unit) was deployed to the Miami/Key West area (the 8th Battalion (Hawk) was at the fort in late 1964). Fort Meade bomb disposal experts were dispatched to secure nuclear bombs in the 1964 Savage Mountain B-52 crash.

In 1977, a merger organized the fort's U.S. Army Intelligence Agency as part of the United States Army Intelligence and Security Command. On October 1, 1991, a wing of the Air Force Intelligence Command transferred to Fort Meade, and the organization was replaced by the 70th Operations Group on May 1, 2005. In the early 1990s, 12.7 sq mi (33 km^{2}) was transferred from the post to the Patuxent Research Refuge. A planned closure of the post in the 1990s was not implemented, and the Defense Information School moved to the fort in 1995. The 311th Signal Command headquarters was at Fort Meade from 1996 to September 2006.

=== 21st century ===
The 70th Intelligence Wing headquarters was established at Fort Meade on July 17, 2000, and the Base Realignment and Closure, 2005, designated Fort Meade to gain 5,700 positions. Fort Meade currently has more than 54,000 employees (service members and civilians), and is the largest employer in the state of Maryland and second largest installation by employee population in the Army.

After an August 27, 2007, U.S. Environmental Protection Agency order to assess the contamination at 14 hazardous waste sites on Fort Meade, such as an ordnance disposal area, 1940s waste dump, closed sanitary landfill, a September 2007 environmental impact report identified adding two golf courses would be a "significant threat to the biological and territorial integrity of the Patuxent Research Refuge". The US Army responded that it is "taking steps to limit the environmental damage."

=== Defense Information Systems Agency ===
After United States Cyber Command was established at the post in 2009; on April 15, 2011, the Defense Information Systems Agency ribbon-cutting for the move from Arlington County, Virginia, was at the agency's Fort Meade complex of 95 acres (38 ha).

=== Defense Information School ===
The consolidation of the Defense Information School and the Defense Visual Information School in fiscal 1996 and further consolidation with the Defense Photography School in fiscal 1998 created a single focal point in the Department of Defense for these specialties fields. Advancements in information technology and recent base realignment and closure initiatives have contributed to the evolution of the school. The result is a single school proud of its historical roots and dedicated to serving the diverse requirements for public affairs, broadcasting and visual information. On 15 October 2026, the Army established the United States Army Public Affairs School at Fort Meade.

=== Security incidents ===
Alleged gunman Hong Young was arrested in connection with shootings at five public places in Maryland, including an NSA building, theaters and occupied vehicles in late February 2015. No motive has been established but his estranged wife attributed his behavior to mental issues, and he told police he heard voices telling him to shoot at a random driver.

On March 30, 2015, National Security Agency police officers shot and killed a person who attempted to drive an SUV through a restricted entrance to the NSA campus in Fort Meade, Maryland. A passenger in the SUV was injured, as was an officer, and both were treated at a hospital. President Obama was briefed but the FBI determined "we do not believe it is related to terrorism."

On February 14, 2018, National Security Agency police officers shot and wounded an individual who rammed an SUV into a barricade near an entry gate outside of the facility. In the immediate aftermath of the event, the NSA announced that there was "no ongoing security or safety threat."

== Geography ==
Fort Meade is bordered by the Baltimore–Washington Parkway on the west and is about 5 miles (8.0 km) east of Interstate 95. It is located between Washington, D.C., and Baltimore. It is located in proximity to Odenton, Columbia, Jessup, Hanover, Laurel, and Severn.

== Based units ==
Notable military and government units based at Fort George G. Meade.

=== United States Army ===
United States Army Civil Affairs & Psychological Operations Command (Airborne)

- 352nd Civil Affairs Command

United States Army Corps of Engineers

- North Atlantic Division
  - Baltimore District
    - Bay Area Office

United States Army Criminal Investigation Command

- 68th Military Police Detachment (CID)

United States Army Forces Command

- First Army Division East
  - 72nd Field Artillery Brigade
    - 3rd Training Support Battalion

United States Army Intelligence & Security Command

- 704th Military Intelligence Brigade
  - Headquarters and Headquarters Company
  - 741st Military Intelligence Battalion
  - 742nd Military Intelligence Battalion (Network Warfare)
- 780th Military Intelligence Brigade
  - Headquarters and Headquarters Company
  - 781st Military Intelligence Battalion
- 902nd Military Intelligence Group
  - Headquarters and Headquarters Detachment
  - 308th Military Intelligence Battalion

United States Army Recruiting Command

- 1st Recruiting Brigade
- Medical Recruiting Brigade
  - 1st Medical Recruiting Battalion

United States Army Reserve

- 48th Combat Support Hospital
- 200th Military Police Command

United States Army Training and Doctrine Command

- Asymmetric Warfare Group

Maryland Army National Guard

- 32nd Civil Support Team

Other

- 241st Military Police Detachment
- 55th Signal Company (Combat Camera)
- Army Audit Agency
- Army Public Affairs Center
- Forensic Toxicology Drug Testing Laboratory
- US Army Field Band

=== United States Marines ===
Marine Corps Forces Cyberspace Command

- Headquarters Marine Corps Cyberspace Command

Marine Corps Information Command

- Marine Cryptologic Support Battalion
  - Headquarters Marine Cryptologic Support Battalion
  - Company B
  - Company L

=== United States Air Force ===
Air Combat Command

- Sixteenth Air Force
  - 70th Intelligence, Surveillance and Reconnaissance Wing
    - Headquarters 70th Intelligence, Surveillance and Reconnaissance Wing
    - 70th Operations Support Squadron
    - 659th Intelligence, Surveillance, and Reconnaissance Group
      - 7th Intelligence Squadron
      - 41st Intelligence Squadron
    - 691st Intelligence, Surveillance, and Reconnaissance Group
      - 22nd Intelligence Squadron
      - 29th Intelligence Squadron
      - 34th Intelligence Squadron
    - 707th Intelligence, Surveillance, and Reconnaissance Group
      - 32nd Intelligence Squadron
      - 94th Intelligence Squadron
      - 707th Communications Squadron
      - 707th Force Support Squadron

Air Force Reserve Command

- Tenth Air Force
  - 655th Intelligence, Surveillance and Reconnaissance Wing
    - 655th Intelligence, Surveillance and Reconnaissance Group
      - 16th Intelligence Squadron
      - 512th Intelligence Squadron

=== United States Navy ===
United States Fleet Cyber Command (United States Tenth Fleet)

- Cryptologic Warfare Group Six

=== Department of Defense ===
Defense Counterintelligence and Security Agency

- Consolidated Adjudications Facility

Defense Information Systems Agency

- Headquarters Defense Information Systems Agency

Defense Media Activity

- Headquarters Defense Media Activity
- Defense Information School

United States Cyber Command

- Headquarters United States Cyber Command

United States Transportation Command

- Defense Courier Service
  - Defense Courier Station, Baltimore

Defense Logistics Agency

- DLA – Disposition Services

=== United States Department of the Navy ===
Naval Criminal Investigative Service

- Department of the Navy Central Adjudication Facility

=== United States Environmental Protection Agency ===
- Environmental Science Center

=== Library of Congress ===
- Book Storage Facility

=== National Security Agency ===
- Headquarters National Security Agency

== Library of Congress ==
Fort Meade is used as a storage facility for the United States Library of Congress.

In 1994, a 100 acres (40 ha) site located in the U.S. Army Base at Fort Meade, MD was transferred to the U.S. Congress to provide additional storage capacity for the Library of Congress and other legislative bodies. The current master plan includes the land to construct up to 13 Phased Storage Modules for collections, if this number is needed.

In subsequent years, Congress provided construction funds in the Architect of the Capitol budget for Module 1, completed in 2002, for Module 2, completed in 2005 and Modules 3 and 4 and four cold storage rooms, completed in 2009. A full-scale three-year transfer program of the special format collections to Modules 3 and 4 and the four cold storage rooms began in Spring 2010 and was completed in September 2012. Module 5 has been fully funded with occupancy scheduled for September 2017.

The state-of-the art storage modules are being built to store, preserve and protect the library's collections. Collections include books and bound periodicals as well as special format collections, such as maps, manuscripts, prints, photographs, sheet music, and microfilm masters. If needed and constructed, the 13 collections storage modules will provide a total of 180,600 gross sq ft of archival storage space for the library's collections.

== Museums ==
The Fort George G. Meade Museum exhibited the post's historical artifacts, including uniforms, insignia, and equipment. The museum also had a small collection of vehicles, including a Renault FT, a MK VIII Liberty Tank, an M3A1 Stuart, an M4A3E8 Sherman, an M41 Walker Bulldog, an M47 Patton, armored personnel carriers such as an M113, M114, M84, a Nike Ajax missile, and a UH-1H helicopter. The Fort George G. Meade Community Council noted in July 2018 that the museum would close, with artifacts relocated to the National Museum of the United States Army under construction in Fort Belvoir, Virginia.

== Transportation ==
Since 2005, the NSA operates a shuttle service from the Odenton station of MARC to its Visitor Control Center at Fort Meade. In 2009, the U.S. Army established a similar shuttle service from the Odenton station to the Army section of Fort Meade; the NSA operates this service, allowing garrison employees, persons with Fort Meade visitor passes, and U.S. Department of Defense IDs to board.

== Education ==
Dependent children living on post are zoned to schools operated by the Anne Arundel County Public Schools. The school district operates an early childhood center, three elementary schools, two middle schools, and one high school on-post.

On-post schools include:

- West Meade Early Education Center
- Manor View Elementary School
- Meade Heights Elementary School
- Pershing Hill Elementary School
- MacArthur Middle School
- Meade Middle School
- Meade Senior High School

== Housing concerns ==
In February 2019, Secretary of the Army Mark Esper, Chief of Staff Mark Milley, and Sgt. Maj. of the Army Daniel A. Dailey met with the commander of IMCOM, the Fort Meade garrison commander, and Army families over safety concerns with housing units on the base in which residents were exposed to lead and asbestos. After speaking with the CEO for the company which manages the house maintenance of the installation, the senior leaders of the Army will determine necessary actions. "We are deeply troubled by the recent reports highlighting the deficient conditions in some of our family housing. It is unacceptable for our families who sacrifice so much to have to endure these hardships in their own homes."—Secretary of the Army, Mark T. Esper and Chief of Staff of the Army, Gen. Mark A. Milley

== Gallery ==
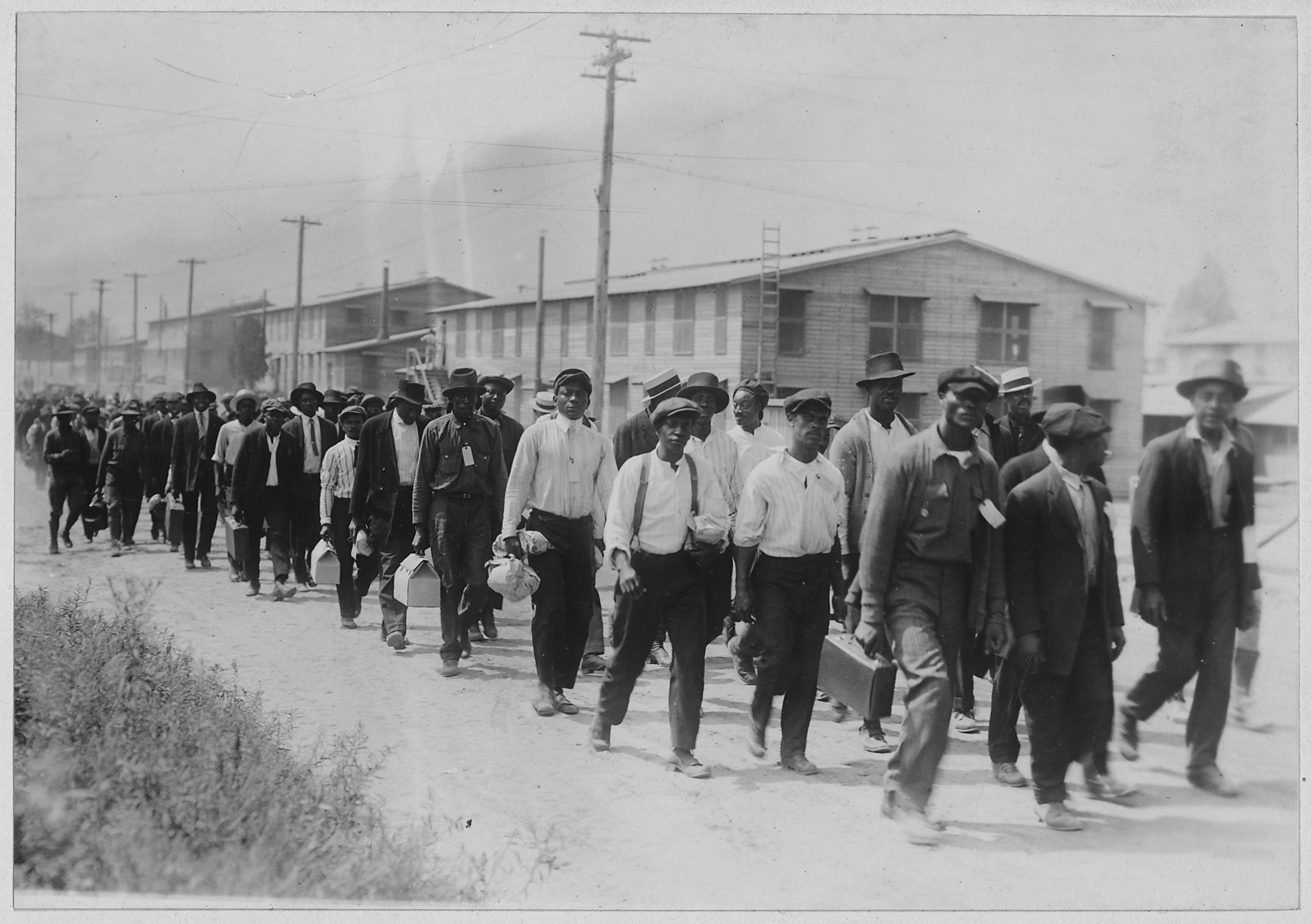
New recruits arrive, circa 1917–1919

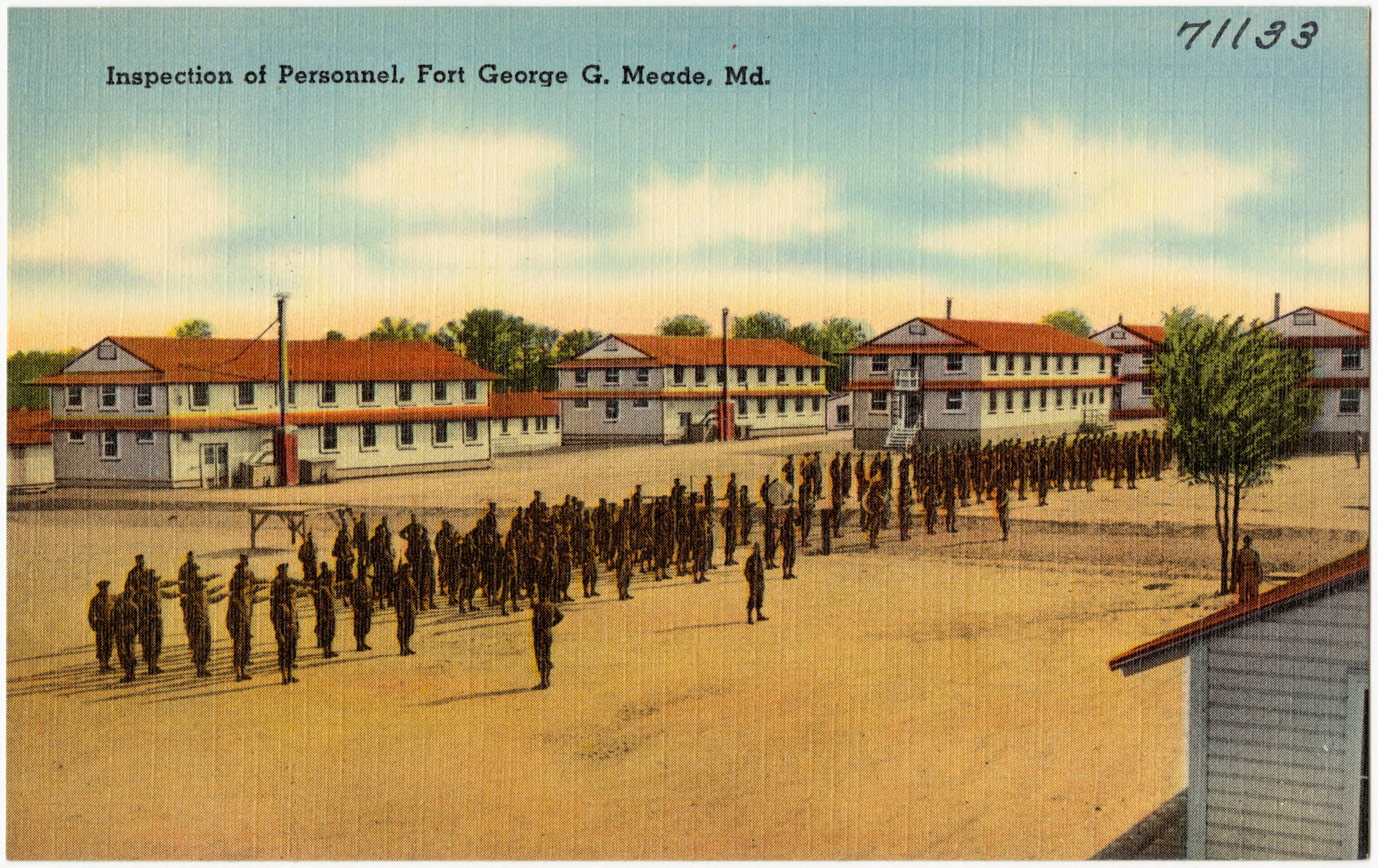
Inspection of personnel, circa 1930–1945

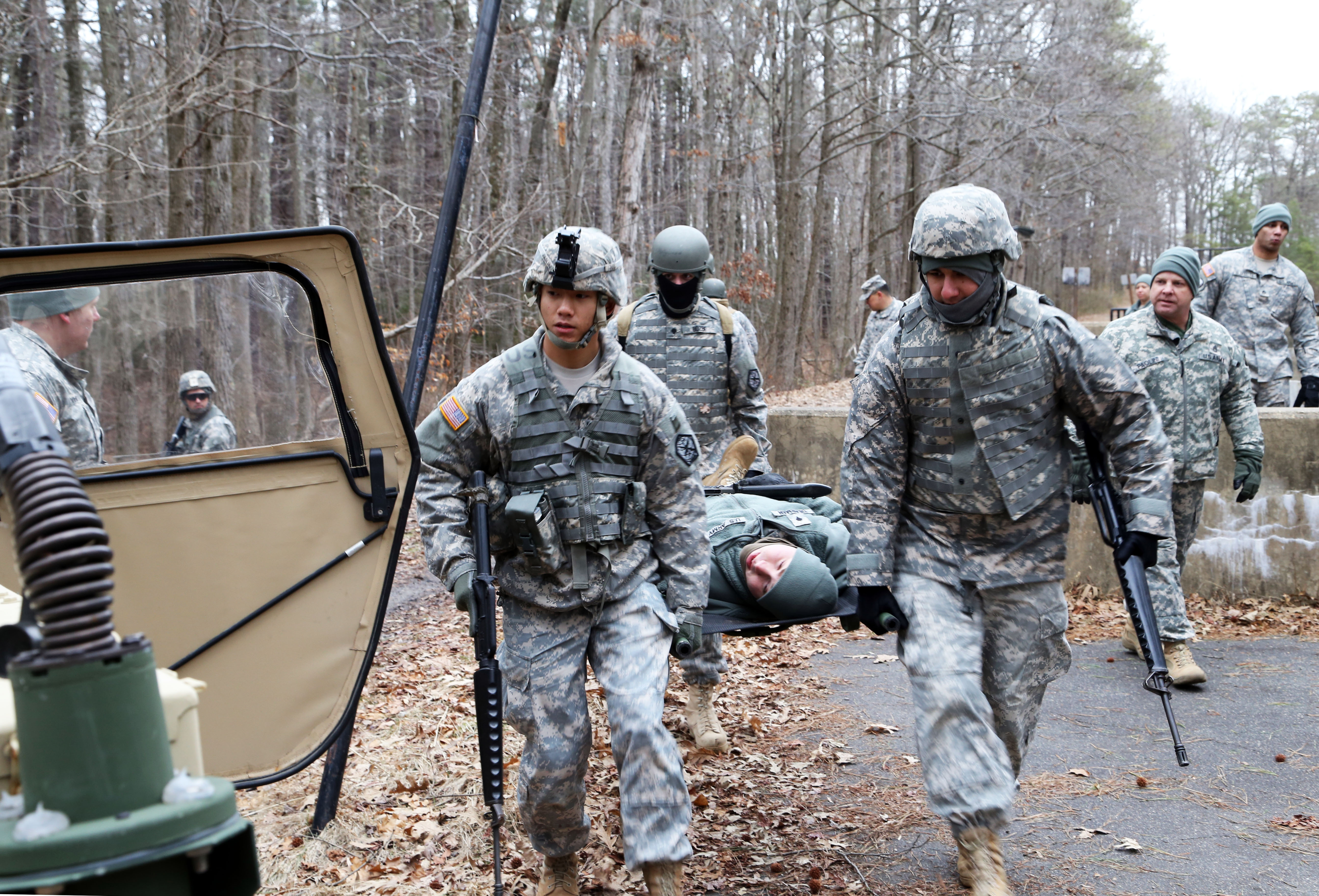
Medical situational training exercise, 2014

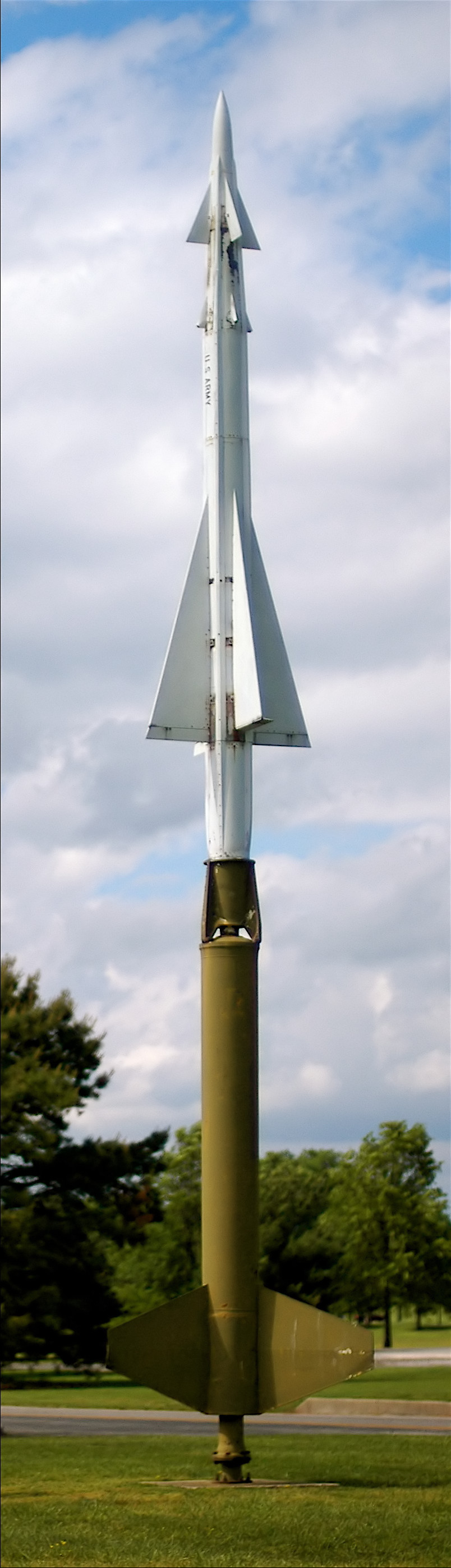
Nike missile on display at Fort Meade

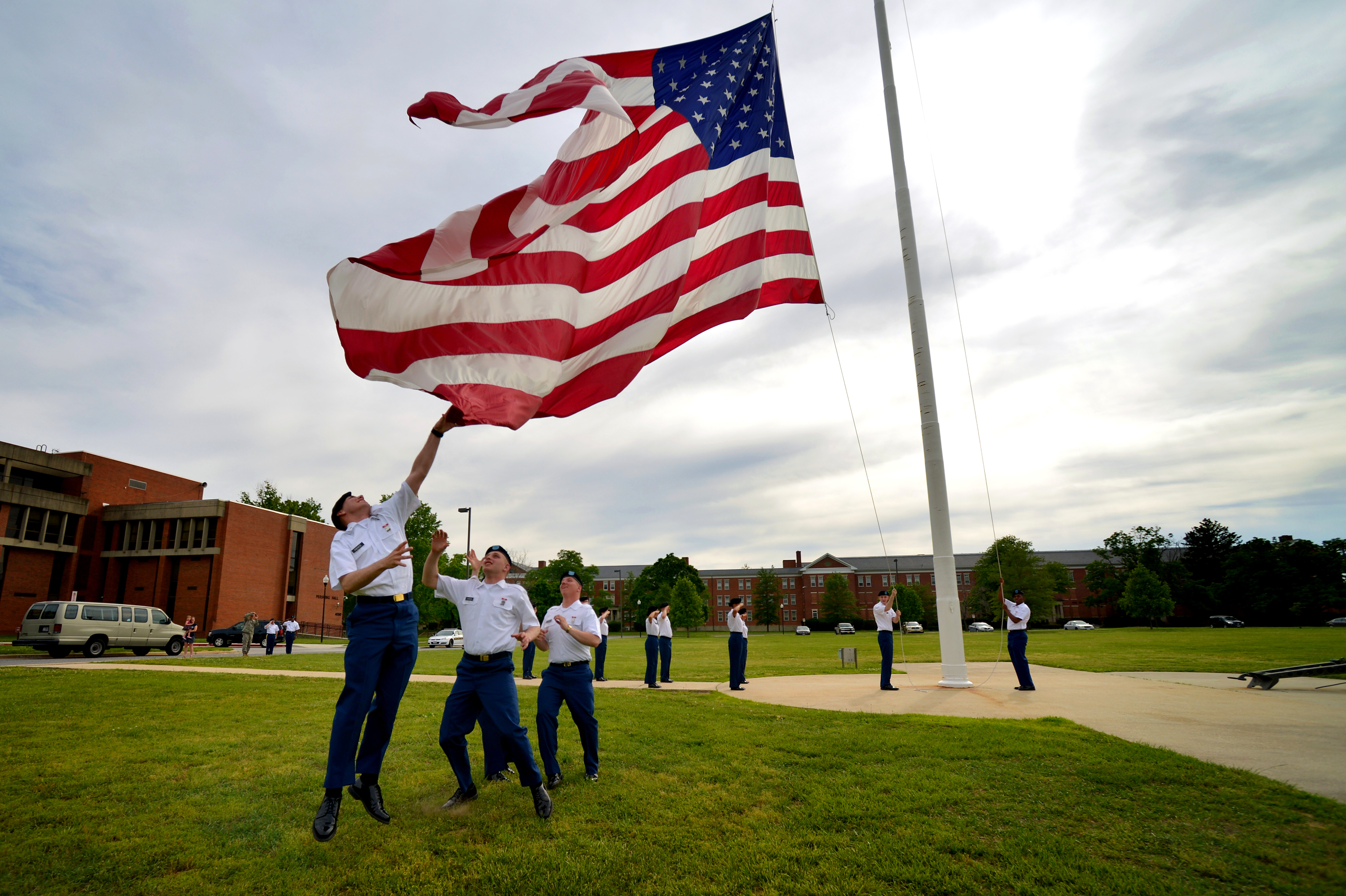
Army soldiers from the Defense Information School lower the flag, 2014

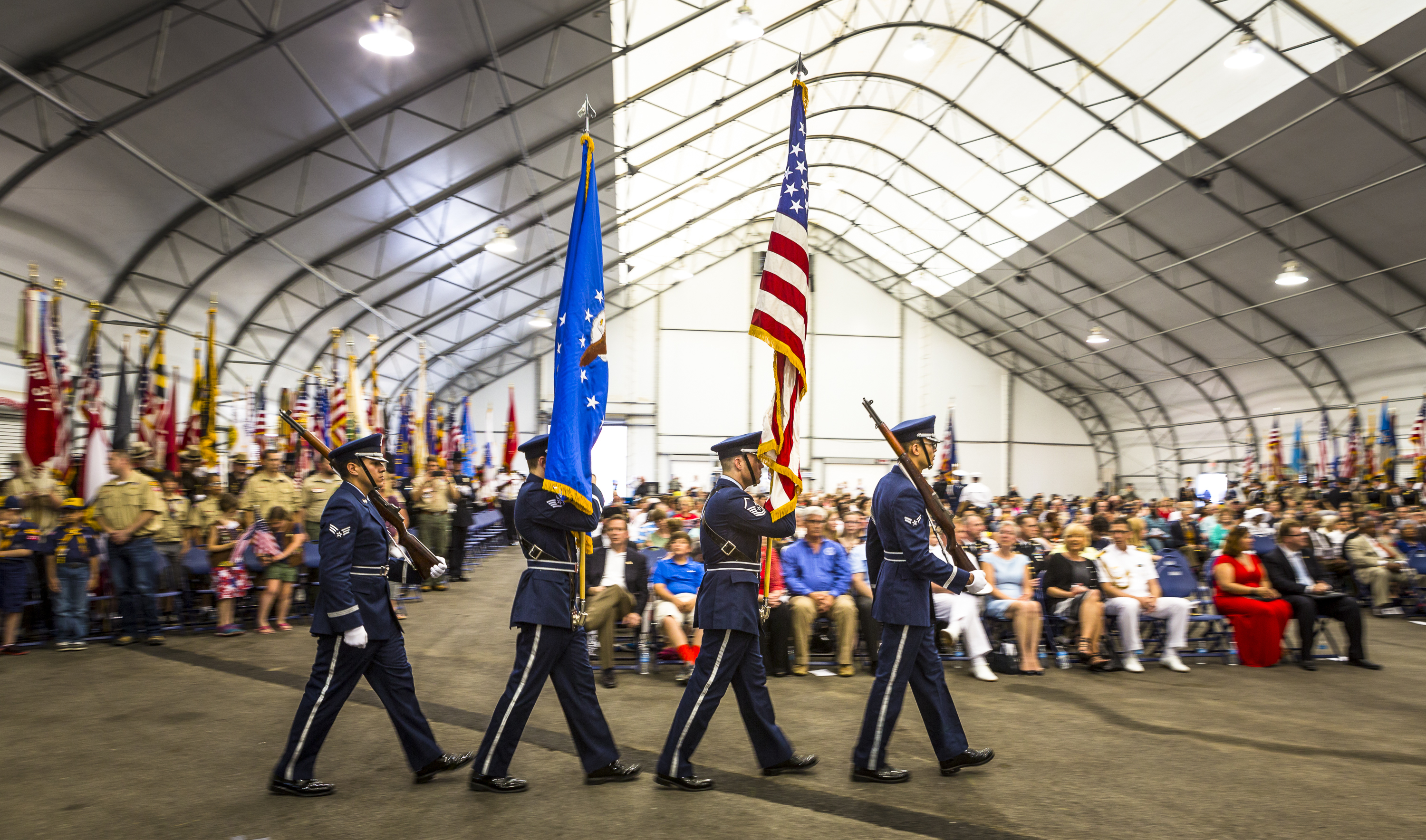
Air Force Color Guard march during Massing of the Colors, 2015

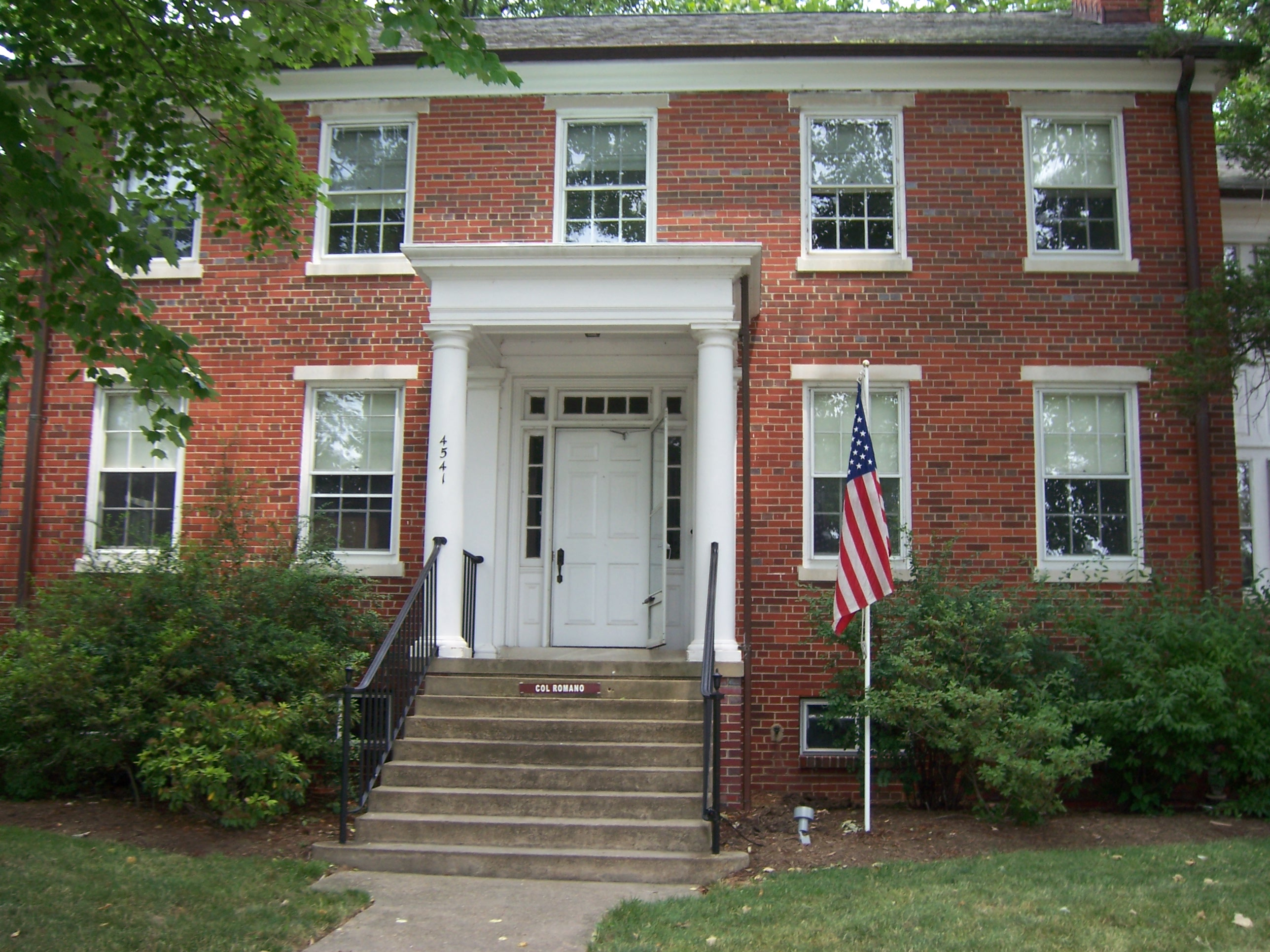
Officer housing at Fort Meade

== See also ==
- List of United States military bases
