= 310th Military Intelligence Battalion (United States) =

United States Army

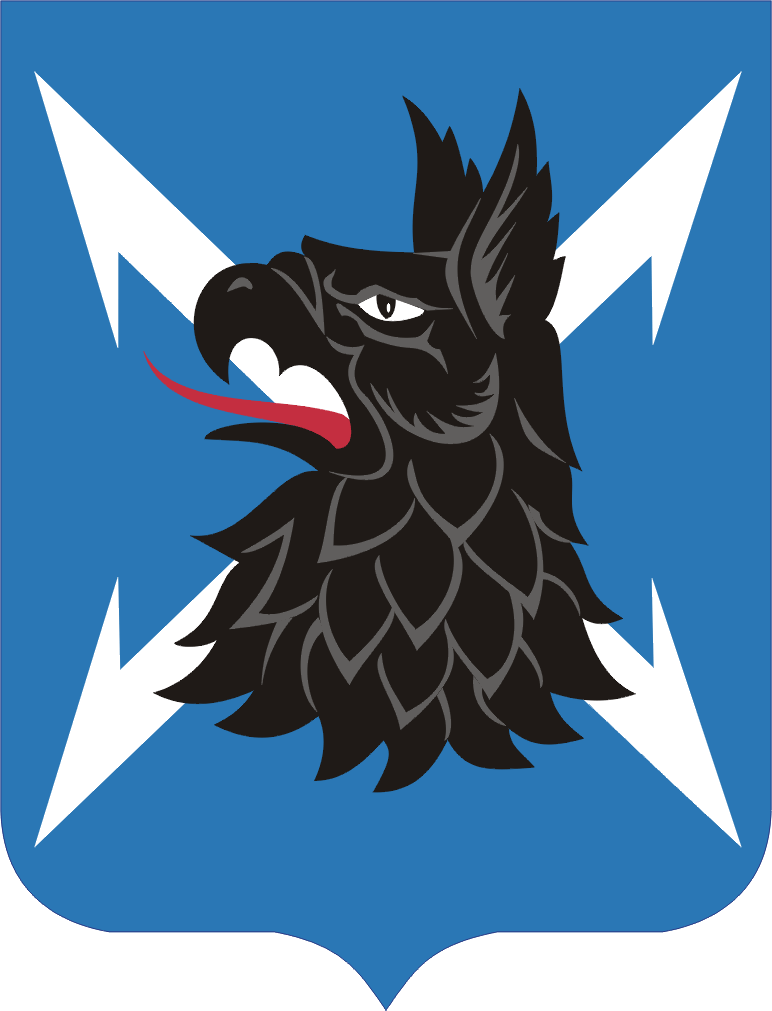
- 310th Military Intelligence Battalion Coat of Arms
- Active: 1954 - 1959; 1991 - 1995; 1996 - present
- Country: United States
- Branch: United States Army
- Type: Military intelligence
- Size: Battalion
- Part of: 902nd MI Group; (1996 - present); 470th MI Brigade; (1991 - 1995)
- Motto(s): Arrectis Auribus; (Always on the Alert)

Insignia
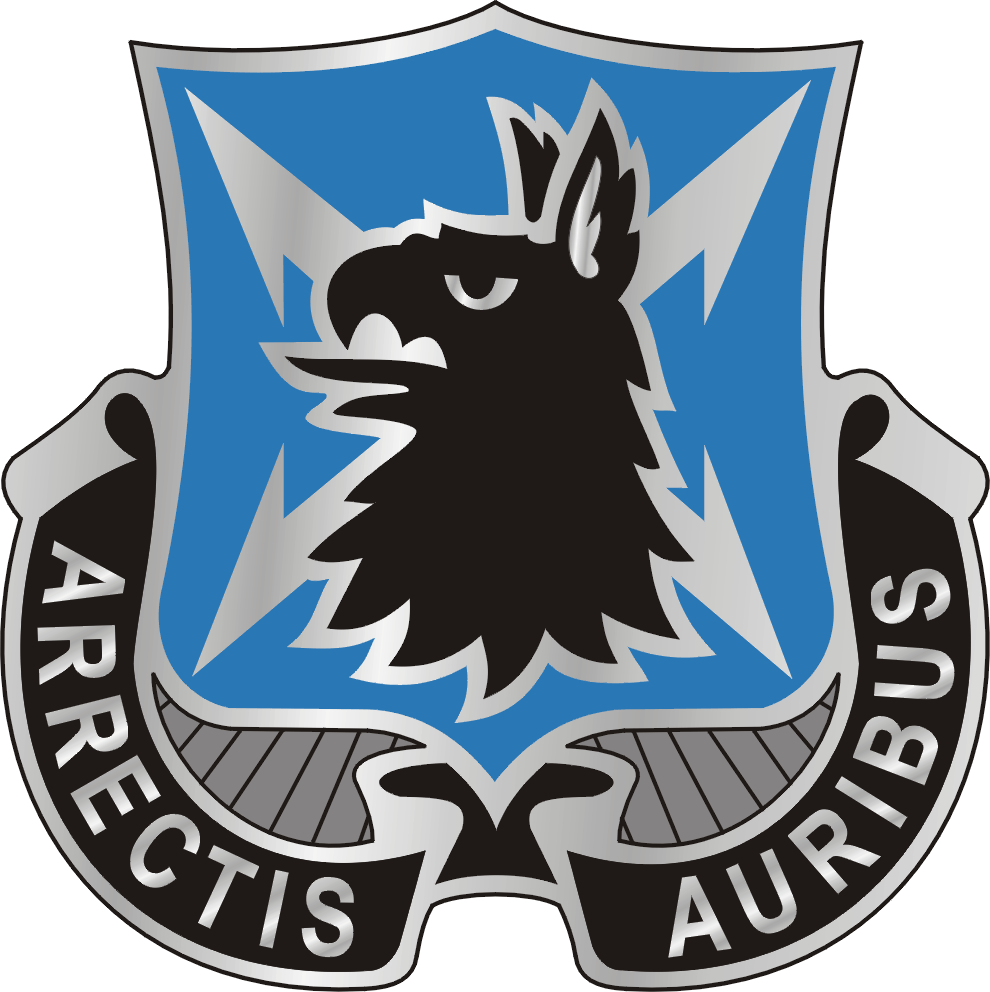
- Distinctive Unit Insignia

The 310th Military Intelligence Battalion is an active duty Military Intelligence (MI) Battalion of the United States Army assigned to the 902nd MI Group. The 310th MI Battalion conducts proactive technical counterintelligence operations and support, counterespionage investigations and analysis and production to detect, identify, assess, counter, neutralize or exploit foreign intelligence entities, international terrorist organizations and insider threats.
