= Military Intelligence Civilian Excepted Career Program =

Department of the Army Headquarters career management program

The Military Intelligence Civilian Excepted Career Program (MICECP) is a Department of the Army Headquarters career management program administered by the US Army Field Support Center of the US Army Intelligence and Security Command (INSCOM). The Military Intelligence Civilian Excepted Career Program is tasked with recruiting, training and developing a dedicated civilian intelligence workforce to conduct sensitive intelligence and counterintelligence operations missions worldwide. The program operates from Fort George G. Meade, Maryland.

Military Intelligence Civilian Excepted Career Program members, are actively recruited, trained, and assigned to conduct highly specialized operational intelligence functions within the Army, as Intelligence Operations Specialists. Members must agree to a mobility agreement and be willing to be assigned and reassigned according to the needs of the program. Positions filled by MICECP employees may require competency in any one or more of the following fields: Foreign Counterintelligence, counterintelligence investigations, collection, analysis, production, force protection, target exploitation (TAREX), human intelligence (HUMINT) operations, counterintelligence force protection source operations (CFSO), liaison, intelligence support, staff management, technical intelligence disciplines, support to special mission units/special operations forces (SMU/SOF), foreign languages, technology protection, and advice and assistance.

In 1998, Ric Romero was a Counterintelligence Special Agent/Army Civilian for the MICECP and he is the currently Career Program Manager there.
