= The Oracle (University of South Florida) =

Student-run newspaper

- Type: Student newspaper
- Format: Tabloid print format
- Owner: University of South Florida
- Editor-in-chief: Clinton Engelberger
- Founded: September 6, 1966
- Headquarters: Tampa, Florida, U.S.
- Website: https://www.usforacle.com/

The Oracle, the University of South Florida's (USF) editorially independent, student-run newspaper, made history when its premiere issue was published September 6, 1966. It was the first college newspaper in the United States to feature full color photographs on the front page of each issue, according to the Associated Collegiate Press (ACP).

== History ==
=== Creation ===
The Oracle replaced the USF Campus Edition of the now defunct Tampa Times, which had previously served as the school's news publication. The Tampa Times had given the student newspaper three pages of its Monday editions, the front page and pages one and two of the second section, to feature USF campus news. The newspaper made a special Campus Edition press run after its own Monday morning early editions were completed specifically to print papers to be distributed in designated racks on campus and at nearby venues. The university had not yet formed a school for mass communication, so publishing the newspaper was the responsibility of a modest journalism effort, offering four or five basic news writing and editing courses and run by its English department.

=== Early years ===
In the summer of 1966, Dr. Arthur M. Sanderson, director of student publications and English professor, entered into an agreement with the St. Petersburg Times to print an entire stand-alone newspaper which would be distributed on campus each Wednesday. Associate communications professor and Oracle general manager Steve Yates, editor-in-chief Harry Haigley and photographer/reporter Tony Zappone collaborated in naming it The Oracle, a Greek term signifying an infallible authority, among other things. (One consideration had been to name it the "USF Bull Sheet.") Its first staff consisted of about 20 student volunteers and part-time paid student staffers who used a small office space on the second floor of the old University Student Center, since torn down and replaced, as headquarters. Yates became the academic faculty coordinator of the paper and kept offices, along with Sanderson, in a room adjacent to the newspaper office for ease of consultation.

=== Front page color ===
Editor Haigley assigned Zappone, The Oracle's first staff shutterbug, the task of creating one color photograph illustrating an aspect of campus life or events for the front page of each issue. It was a feature that no other university newspaper had at that time and was a cooperative effort with the St. Petersburg Times (now The Tampa Bay Times).

Each Tuesday, Haigley, Zappone and a third alternating staff member drove 30 miles from the USF campus in North Tampa to the downtown St. Petersburg headquarters of the St. Pete Times to spend an afternoon supervising the composing room staff while mechanicals and plates for the late night press run of The Oracle were assembled. The papers were trucked to the campus each week in the early-morning hours and set out in racks around the campus.

=== Present ===
The print edition is now published Mondays and Thursdays, with digital updates throughout the week. The Oracle has won numerous awards over the years,

== Awards ==
In 1967, during its first year of publication, The Oracle was awarded several of the Associated Collegiate Press' National Pacemaker Awards for "excellence in college journalism." Another historic effort by The Oracle was the production of a full-color campus feature magazine insert once each term, edited by Yates and Zappone, with contributions of copy and photographs from The Oracle staff and USF faculty members. The magazine was recognized by the Associated Collegiate Press as the only magazine insert published by a university newspaper at that time.

In September 1970, the newspaper began publishing on Tuesdays and Fridays and in 1972 enhanced the student news and advertising sales staff sufficiently to publish Tuesdays through Fridays in a reduced tabloid-size format. In 1989, The Oracle was named to the ACP's Hall of Fame. The paper won the 1990 Society of Professional Journalists award for Best Student Daily in the Nation (no second or third place was declared that year).
