= 308th Military Intelligence Battalion (United States) =

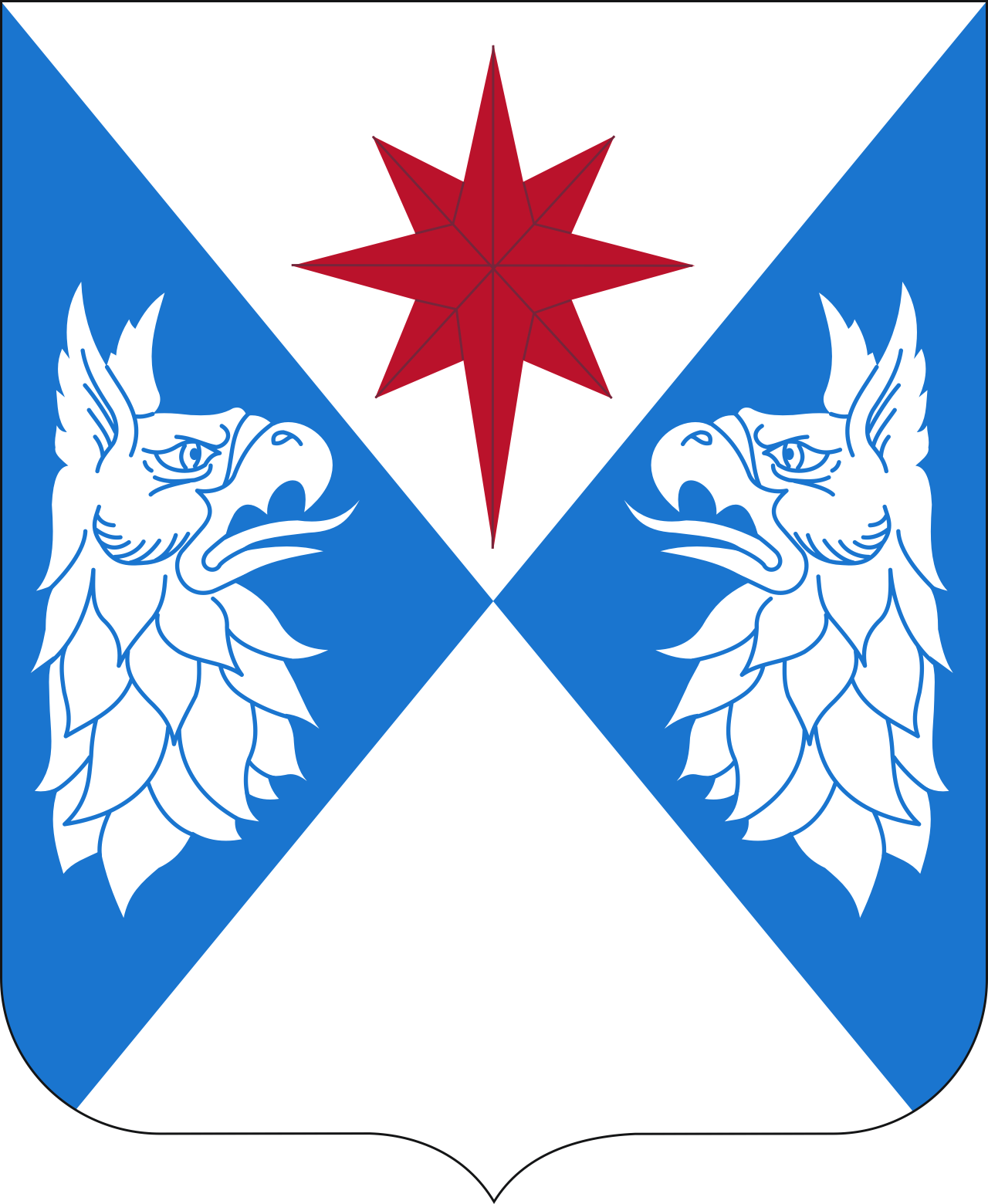
- 308th Military Intelligence Battalion Coat of Arms
- Active: 1952 - 1959; 1991 - 1995; 1996 - present
- Country: United States
- Branch: United States Army
- Type: Military Intelligence
- Size: Battalion
- Part of: 902nd MI Group; (1996 - present); 470th MI Brigade; (1991 - 1995)
- Motto(s): Guardians of America

Insignia
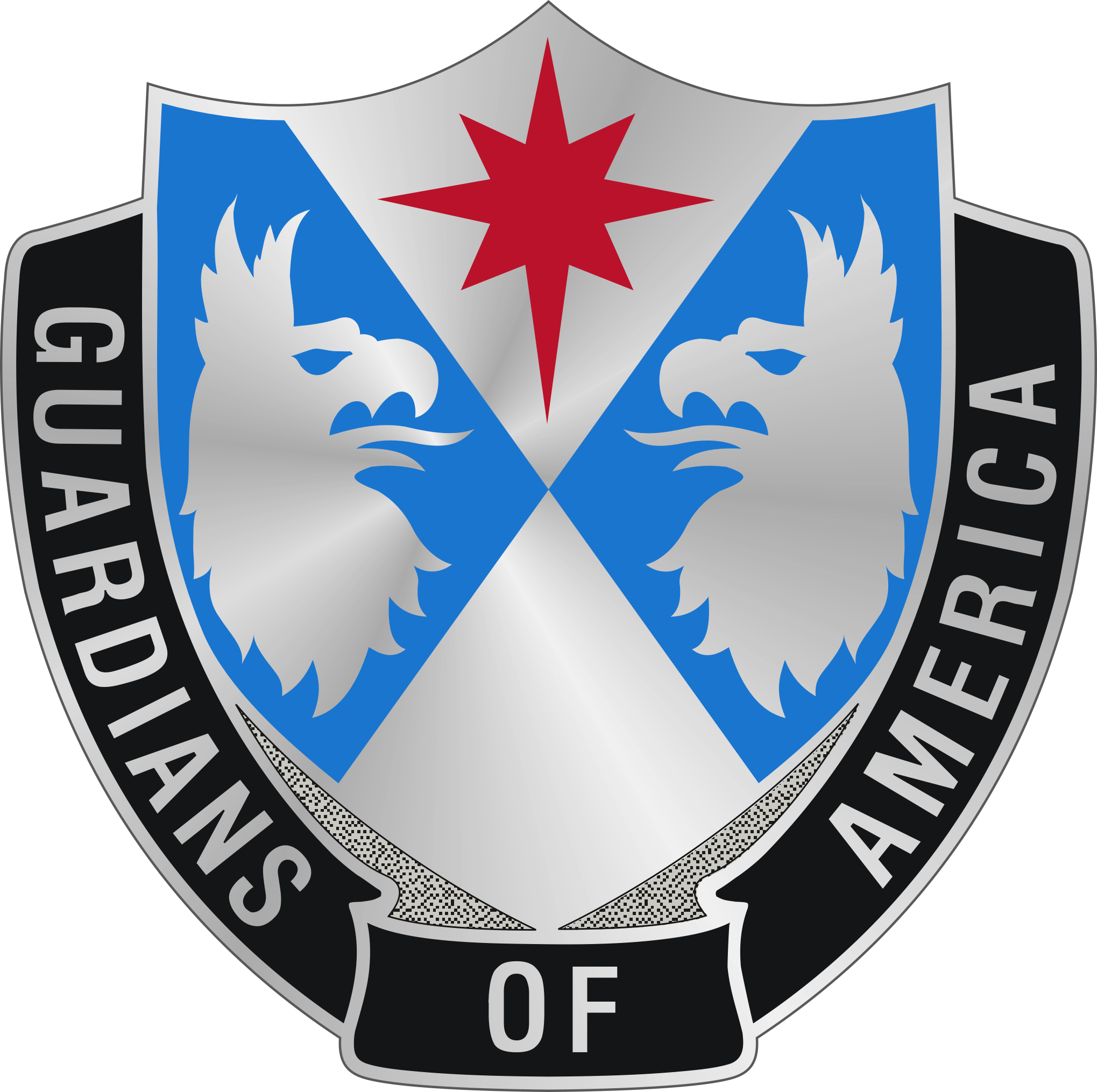
- Distinctive Unit Insignia

The 308th Military Intelligence Battalion is an active duty Military Intelligence (MI) Battalion of the United States Army assigned to the 902nd MI Group, an Intelligence & Security Command (INSCOM) subordinate.

According to the INSCOM web page: The 308th MI Battalion conducts counterintelligence investigations, operations, collection and analysis to detect, exploit and neutralize foreign intelligence entities, international terrorism and insider threats to U.S. Army Forces, technologies, information and infrastructure. On order provides tailored CI support to overseas contingency operations.

The 308th also operates all of the INSCOM counterintelligence field offices within the continental U.S. which are staffed by counterintelligence special agents. These field offices are the public investigative offices in which anyone can go to in order to report a counterintelligence/security incident.

== Lineage ==
The official lineage of the 308th MI Battalion from the Army Center of Military History is:

- Constituted 31 January 1952 in the Organized Reserve Corps as Headquarters and Headquarters Detachment, 308th Communication Reconnaissance Battalion
- Activated 1 April 1952 at New York, New York
- (Organized Reserve Corps redesignated 9 July 1952 as the Army Reserve)
- Reorganized and redesignated 23 January 1956 as Headquarters and Headquarters Company, 308th Communication Reconnaissance Battalion
- Redesignated 1 September 1956 as Headquarters and Headquarters Company, 308th Army Security Agency Battalion
- Inactivated 1 July 1959 at New York, New York
- Redesignated 1 February 1990 as Headquarters and Headquarters Company, 308th Military Intelligence Battalion; concurrently withdrawn from the Army Reserve and allotted to the Regular Army
- Redesignated 17 October 1991 as Headquarters, Headquarters and Service Company, 308th Military Intelligence Battalion, and activated in Panama (organic elements concurrently constituted and activated)
- Battalion inactivated 16 September 1995 in Panama
- Activated 16 October 1996 at Fort George G. Meade, Maryland

== Unit Awards ==
Army Superior Unit Award
15 December 1993 - 15 December 1994

Detachments to 319th MI Bn additionally entitled to:
Meritorious Unit Commendation
Afghanistan
8 March 2013 - 10 October 2013

== Heraldry ==
The official descriptions of the 308th's heraldic items as follows are from The Institute of Heraldry:

=== Coat of arms ===
==== Blazon ====
The shield is per saltire Argent and Azure (Oriental Blue), two griffin heads erased respectant of the first, in chief a compass rose Gules.

==== Symbolism ====
Oriental blue is the primary color associated with the Military Intelligence Corps. The saltire represents strength and cooperation. The griffins embody vigilance, alertness and courage and reflect the unit's motto and mission. The compass rose alludes to the collection, analysis and dissemination of information and the worldwide capabilities of the unit.

=== Distinctive unit insignia ===
==== Blazon ====
A Silver color metal and enamel device 1 1/8 inches (2.9 cm) in height overall consisting of a shield blazoned: Per saltire Argent and Azure (Oriental Blue), two griffin heads erased respectant of the first, in chief a compass rose Gules. Attached below and to the sides of the shield a Black tripartite scroll inscribed "GUARDIANS OF AMERICA" in Silver letters.

== DOD oversight report ==
In 2004, a Department of Defense Oversight Report indicated that Special Agents assigned to both the 308 MI battalion and the 902nd MI group attended a University of Texas School of Law to inappropriately make inquiries at a conference on Islamic Law.
