= 902nd Military Intelligence Group (United States) =

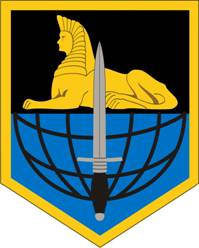
- 902nd Military Intelligence Group shoulder sleeve insignia
- Active: unknown – July 28th, 2022
- Country: United States
- Branch: United States Army
- Role: Military intelligence
- Size: Brigade
- Part of: US Army Intelligence and Security Command
- Garrison/HQ: Fort George G. Meade
- Motto: Strength Through Vigilance
- Decorations: Army Superior Unit Award

Insignia
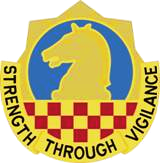
- Distinctive unit insignia

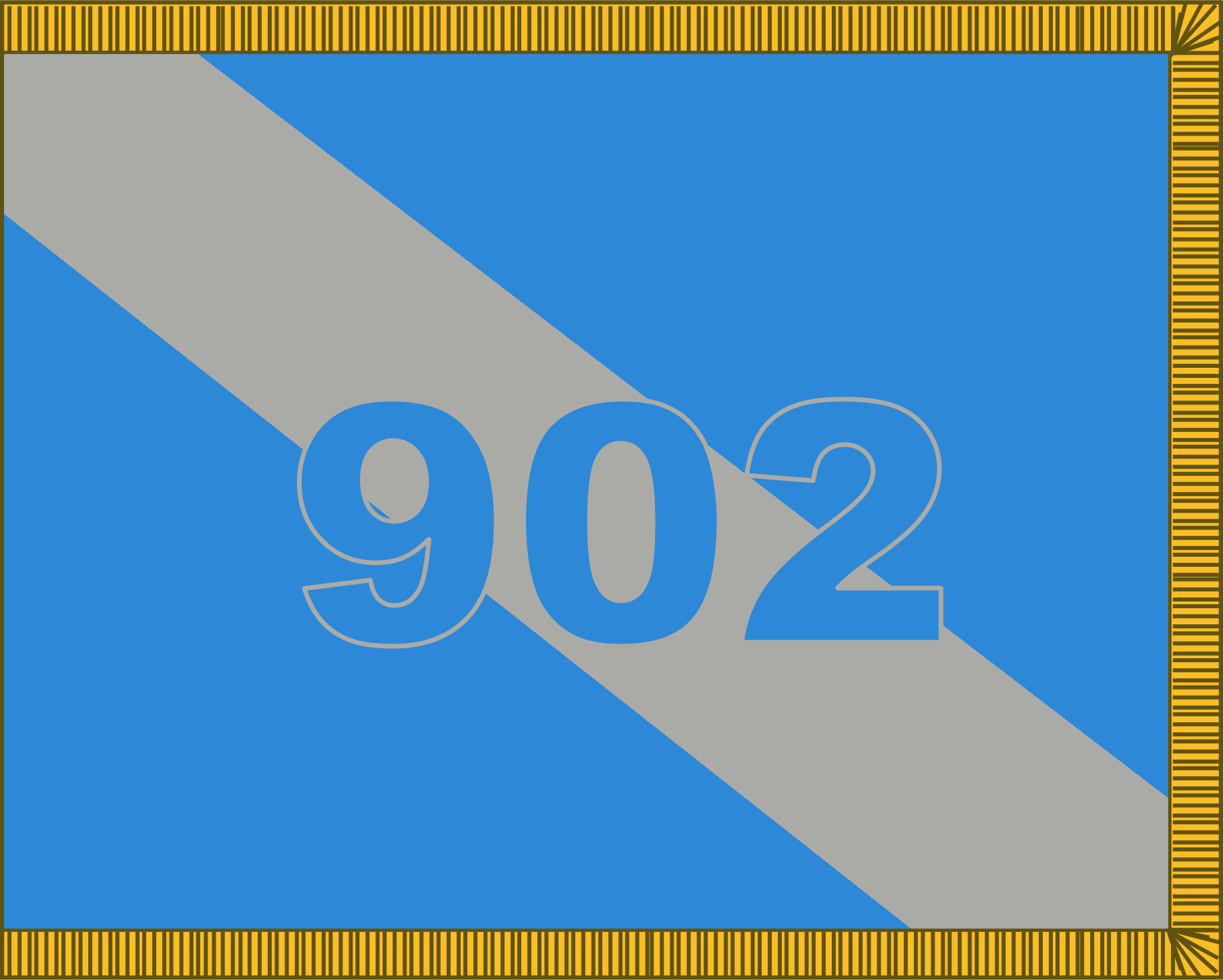
- 902nd Military Intelligence Group Flag

The 902nd Military Intelligence Group was a brigade-sized unit of the United States Army that operated under the command of the United States Army Intelligence and Security Command. Its primary focus was counterintelligence. The headquarters of the unit were located at Fort Meade, Maryland.

== History ==
The 902nd MI Group, originally known as the Counterintelligence Corps, was first activated on November 23, 1944. It was last commanded by Col. Maria C. Borbon, who participated in its inactivation ceremony.

On June 30, 1974, the unit was reassigned to the U.S. Army Intelligence Agency and given the new mission of providing counterintelligence coverage to the eastern part of the United States. In 1977, as part of a significant restructuring of Army Intelligence, it became part of the newly established U.S. Army Intelligence and Security Command. The 902nd MI Group's role was to integrate counterintelligence and communications security functions, serving as the Army's primary defense against foreign intelligence services and protecting forces in the U.S. prior to deployments.

The 902nd MI Group's known involvement in the 20th century are in the famous Stargate Project. They operated within the project under four of the six known codenames. 'Gondola Wish', 'Grill Flame', 'Center Lane', and 'Sun Streak'.

During the Global War on Terrorism, the 902nd MI Group provided tactical support to deployed forces. It developed a specialized counterintelligence deployment package to enhance the capabilities of theater commanders and supporting military intelligence brigades.

In 2004, a Department of Defense Oversight Report indicated that Special Agents assigned to both the 308 MI battalion and the 902nd MI group attended a University of Texas School of Law to inappropriately make inquiries at a conference on Islamic Law.

The U.S. Army recently marked the activation of the new Army Counterintelligence Command with a ceremony on July 28, 2022. As a result, the 902nd Military Intelligence Group was inactivated in a separate ceremony held earlier that day. This step was taken to align Army counterintelligence efforts with the protection of Army and Department of Defense modernization initiatives.

== Functions of Intelligence ==
The 902nd Military Intelligence (MI) Group is responsible for carrying out proactive counterintelligence activities worldwide. Its mission includes detecting, identifying, assessing, countering, neutralizing, and exploiting foreign intelligence entities and insider threats to safeguard the Army and Department of Defense forces, information, and technology.

The group provides direct and general counterintelligence support for Army activities and significant commands. It also offers support to other military department counterintelligence and intelligence elements, unified commands, defense agencies, and national agency counterintelligence and security activities and organizations.

The 902nd Military Intelligence Group is composed of several subordinate units, including:

- Headquarters and Headquarters Detachment (HHD): This unit provides personnel administration, training, and logistical support to the group.
- 308th Military Intelligence Battalion: Responsible for conducting counterintelligence, counter-terrorism, and counterespionage investigations and operations throughout the continental United States. It operates all IN SCOM counterintelligence field offices within the continental U.S., which serve as public investigative offices for reporting counterintelligence and security incidents.
- 310th Military Intelligence Battalion: Conducts worldwide counterespionage and counterintelligence investigations, counterintelligence operations, and multi-discipline counterintelligence technical operations in support of the Army and defense agencies during peacetime and wartime.
- 752nd Military Intelligence Battalion: Engaged in counterintelligence activities to detect, identify, assess, counter, neutralize, or exploit foreign intelligence entities, international terrorism, and insider threats. It provides tailored counterintelligence support as needed for Army requirements, INSCOM missions, and overseas contingency operations.
- Army Operations Security Detachment (AOSD): Tasked with conducting external operations security to advise and assist commanders in identifying threat vulnerabilities to their static base operations, training exercises, and operational deployments
- The Army Counterintelligence Center (ACIC) assesses foreign intelligence entities, terrorist threats, and cyber threats to deliver current and predictive multi-discipline analysis. This analysis enables warfighters to protect Army forces, facilities, information, and technologies worldwide.

It is worth noting that the 902nd MI Group has been recognized with the Army Superior Unit Award for its exceptional performance.

== See also ==
- United States Army Counterintelligence
- Battlefield Surveillance Brigade

== External links and sources ==
- 902nd Military Intelligence Group homepage
- US Army Intelligence and Security Command home page
