= Defense Courier Service =

U.S. military courier network

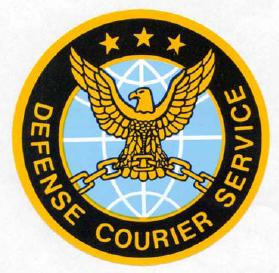
- Active: 1953–present
- Country: United States
- Branch: Joint
- Role: Transport of secure material
- Garrison/HQ: Scott Air Force Base, Illinois, U.S.
- Mottos: Excellence in secure, rapid movement

The Defense Courier Service (DCS) is a global courier network for the expeditious, cost-effective, and secure distribution of highly classified and sensitive material, established under the United States Transportation Command (USTRANSCOM). Operational control of global courier activities is exercised through USTRANSCOM's Defense Courier Division (TCJ3-C). The division oversees and synchronizes activity of 18 courier stations worldwide to service over six thousand accounts. Major accounts include the White House, the Department of Defense, the State Department, other federal agencies, authorized government contractors, and allied nations.

The DCS directly supports the president, Unified and Specified COCOMs, joint military operations, the Joint Chiefs of Staff, National Security Agency, Central Intelligence Agency, U.S. allies, State Department, and other federal agencies.

The DCS was formerly the Armed Forces Courier Service (ARFCOS) but was reorganized and renamed in 1985 after the Walker spy case.

== History ==
Before the establishment of the courier service, American ship captains and selected American travellers were used to carry sealed packages of mail. Later these individuals, called "Bearers of Dispatches," were augmented by a small group of Foreign Service Officers.

With few modifications, this method of moving classified mail abroad continued until 1918 when the War Department established the Military Postal Express Service, consisting of 70 officers and enlisted soldiers, divided into an Overseas Service and a European Service. This continued until the early days of World War II when the War Department activated the Army Courier Service to move classified material between the War Department and various theatres of operation. Meanwhile, the Navy created the Officer Messenger Service and the Army Air Corps operated an Air Courier Service to move cryptographic materials. Frequently, couriers from all three services flew together on the routes.

In November 1946, the War Department discontinued the Army Courier Service and established a "Security Courier Service," which operated until 1949. At this time, certain courier stations were transferred to the newly created U.S. Air Force Security Courier Service. Then in 1952, the Joint Chiefs of Staff directed a review of courier operations which resulted in the establishment of an organization consisting of Army, Navy, and Air Force courier elements. The Armed Forces Courier Service (ARFCOS) was officially established on January 7, 1953. The military courier services were now consolidated. The ARFCOS charter was updated seven times over the next 30 years to reflect changes in the armed forces, military doctrine, and operational procedures.

In the aftermath of the Walker-Whitworth espionage case (1985), the secretary of defense established a Security Commission—often referred to as the Stillwell Commission—to review DoD security policies and practices. As part of its findings, the commission recommended a review and restructuring of ARFCOS and the DoD courier function. This resulted in publication of DoD Directive 5200.33, the revised charter for a new joint-service military command. Thus, the Defense Courier Service (DCS) was officially established on September 30, 1987.

A revised concept for execution of the courier function emerged with the creation of the DCS. Key to this are the following major affiliations:

- Under the DoD, the Office of the Under Secretary of Defense for Intelligence (USD(I)).
- Executive Agency responsibility for the DCS was transferred to the Air Force and, later, delegated to the Air Mobility Command (AMC).
- On December 5, 1994, the DCS became a Direct Reporting unit to the U.S. Transportation Command (USTRANSCOM). Later, on October 1, 1998, DCS was relieved from its assignment to the USTRANSCOM and assigned once again to AMC.
- More recently, on October 1, 2004, DCS was once again, reorganized under USTRANSCOM.

The Gulf War provided the first real-world contingency deployment test of the DCS. Eight days after Iraqi tanks entered Kuwait, a seven-man DCS station was deployed to HQ, Central Command in Riyadh, Saudi Arabia. By the end of the Gulf War, DCS couriers had provided over one million pounds of command, control, and intelligence material.

Since 2004, Defense Courier Service increasingly has been integrated into USTRANSCOM. This process began when Program Budget Decision (PBD) 410, dated December 5, 2003, directed the realignment of Defense Courier Service (DCS) from Air Mobility Command (AMC) to U.S. Transportation Command (USTRANSCOM). On October 1, 2004, DCS was aligned as a Functional Component Command (FCC) under the USTRANSCOM Director of Operations (TCJ3). On May 16, 2005, the Under Secretary of Defense for Intelligence (USD(I)) approved a proposal to eliminate the DCS command billet and integrate the functions of the DCS headquarters staff into USTRANSCOM. On November 15, 2005, the Defense Courier Division (TCJ3-C) assumed operational control of worldwide defense courier stations and continues to synchronize the defense courier related activities of the USTRANSCOM staff.

== See also ==
- Military Postal Service Agency
