= Deaths in February 2026 =

The following is a list of notable deaths in February 2026.

Entries for each day are listed alphabetically by surname. A typical entry lists information in the following sequence:

- Name, age, country of citizenship at birth, subsequent country of citizenship (if applicable), reason for notability, cause of death (if known), and reference.

== February 2026 ==
=== 1 ===
- Vicki Abt, 83, American sociologist, respiratory failure.
- Don Adams, 85, American country singer.
- Fernando Esteso, 80, Spanish comedian, actor (Al este del oeste, Torrente 4: Lethal Crisis, Uncertain Glory), and singer, respiratory failure.
- Bertie Higgins, 81, Scottish footballer (Queen's Park).
- Rafael Hui, 77, Hong Kong civil servant and criminal, secretary for financial services (1995–2000), chief secretary for administration (2005–2007), and unofficial MEC (2007–2009).
- René Kaës, 89, French psychologist and psychoanalyst.
- Mostafa Kamal, 88, Bangladeshi volleyball player (Azad SC), coach, and footballer (Azad SC, Mohammedan SC).
- Swietlan Kraczyna, 85, American painter.
- Manne Liimatainen, 82, Finnish Olympic cross-country skier (1972).
- Graham Morgan, 88, Australian drummer.
- Nobuhiko Ochiai, 84, Japanese journalist and novelist.
- Denise C. Park, 74, American neuroscientist.
- Tony Pigott, 67, English cricketer (Sussex, Surrey, national team), heart attack.
- Nicola Salerno, 69, Italian football sporting director (Cagliari, Catania, Leeds United).
- Rita Süssmuth, 88, German politician, president of the Bundestag (1988–1998) and federal minister for youth, family and health (1985–1988).
- Iosif Szakács, 92, Romanian footballer (Flamura Roșie Arad, Crișana Oradea, Dinamo București).
- Robert Tinney, 78, American illustrator (Byte).
- Sushila Tiriya, 69, Indian politician, MP (1986–1987, 1994–2001, 2006–2007).
- Lucien Weiler, 74, Luxembourgish politician, deputy (1984–2013) and president of the Chamber of Deputies (2004–2009).
- Sir Nicholas White, 74, British medical doctor and researcher, cancer.

=== 2 ===
- Miguel Ángel Alba Díaz, 75, Mexican Roman Catholic prelate, auxiliary bishop of Antequera (1995–2001) and bishop of La Paz en la Baja California Sur (2001–2026).
- Valentin Balakhnichev, 76, Russian athletics coach and sports official, president of the All-Russian Athletics Federation (1991–2015).
- Hem Singh Bhadana, 55, Indian politician, Rajasthan MLA (2013–2018), cancer.
- Gabor Boritt, 86, American historian.
- Alfonso Buller, 66, English musician.
- Frankie Cain, 93, American professional wrestler.
- Josefina Castellví, 90, Spanish oceanographer, head of the Juan Carlos I Antarctic Base (1989–1997) and namesake of Castellvi Peak.
- Ranjit Das, 93, Bangladeshi football player (Azad SC, Dhaka Mohammedan, East Pakistan) and manager, cardiac arrest.
- Teresa de Lauretis, 87, Italian academic, feminist and author.
- Gladys Erbetta, 97, Argentine Olympic sprinter (1952).
- Horst Gallert, 88, German politician, member of the Landtag of Saxony (1990–1994).
- Józef Gąsienica-Sobczak, 91, Polish four-time Olympic skier (1956–1968).
- Nicolas Giani, 39, Italian footballer (Vicenza, SPAL, Feralpisalò).
- Daryl Hoole, 91, American author and public speaker.
- Marian Kasprzyk, 86, Polish boxer, Olympic champion (1964).
- Miroslav Košuta, 89, Slovenian poet.
- Usman Idris Kusfa, 57, Nigerian Islamic cleric.
- Myra MacPherson, 91, American journalist (The Washington Post), author and biographer.
- Bud Moore, 86, American college football player (Alabama Crimson Tide) and coach (Kansas Jayhawks).
- Chuck Negron, 83, American singer (Three Dog Night), heart failure and COPD.
- Ahmad Obeidat, 87, Jordanian politician and intelligence officer, prime minister (1984–1985) and director of the General Intelligence Department (1974–1982).
- Maria Rita Parsi, 78, Italian psychotherapist.
- Ken Peplowski, 66, American jazz clarinetist and tenor saxophonist.
- Peter Phillips, 83, Australian shot putter and Olympic weightlifter (1972).
- Brigitte Reid, 70, German-born Canadian Olympic high jumper (1984).
- Charles Renoux, 100, French Benedictine monk and orientalist.
- Frank S. Royal, 86, American physician, president of the National Medical Association (1981).
- Sandra Schultz Newman, 87, American judge, justice of the Pennsylvania Supreme Court (1996–2006).
- Chuck Sullivan, 83, American lawyer and sports executive (New England Patriots).
- John Terris, 86, New Zealand politician, MP (1978–1990) and mayor of Lower Hutt (1995–2004).
- Jacques Tremblay, 83, Canadian politician, Quebec MNA (1985–1989).
- Jean Widmer, 96, Swiss graphic designer.
- Yuan Wei-jen, 57, Taiwanese singer-songwriter.

=== 3 ===
- J. Edward Anderson, 98, American mechanical engineer.
- Elizabeth Barret, 74, American documentary filmmaker (Stranger with a Camera).
- André Beteille, 91, Indian sociologist.
- José Borba, 76, Brazilian politician, deputy (1995–2005).
- Seiichirō Dōkyū, 72, Japanese politician, MP (2009–2012).
- Saif al-Islam Gaddafi, 53, Libyan politician, shot.
- Sérgio Görgen, 72, Brazilian politician, Rio Grande do Sul MLA (2003–2007), heart attack.
- Lee Hamilton, 94, American politician, member of the U.S. House of Representatives (1965–1999) and vice-chair of the 9/11 Commission (2002–2004).
- Reta Holden, 87, American politician, member of the Mississippi House of Representatives (1992–1999).
- Dame Carole Jordan, 84, British physicist.
- Ron Kenoly, 81, American Christian worship leader, singer and songwriter.
- George LeBlanc, 71, Canadian politician, mayor of Moncton, New Brunswick (2008–2016), complications from corticobasal syndrome.
- Allan Massie, 87, British journalist and author (Augustus, Tiberius, Caesar), cancer.
- Lamonte McLemore, 90, American singer (The 5th Dimension).
- Pierre Merlin, 88, French geographer and academic, president of Paris 8 University (1976–1980).
- Jim Morrison, 94, Canadian ice hockey player (Toronto Maple Leafs, Pittsburgh Penguins, Boston Bruins).
- Ivan Nikulin, 89, Russian politician, member of the Soviet of the Union (1984–1989).
- Fernand Ouellette, 95, Canadian writer.
- Şemsa Özar, 71, Turkish academic.
- Vangelis Petrakis, 87, Greek footballer (Aris, AEK Athens, OFI).
- Syed Ahmed Pasha Quadri, 72, Indian politician, Andhra Pradesh MLA (2004–2018) and Telangana MLA (2018–2023), kidney disease.
- Ruben Rodriguez, 60, American football player (Seattle Seahawks).
- Herbert Sukopp, 95, German ecologist and academic.
- Ron Teasley, 99, American baseball player (New York Cubans).
- Janken Varden, 87, Norwegian theatre director (Oslo Nye Teater).
- S. P. Venkatesh, 70, Indian film score composer (Kilukkam, Spadikam, Rajavinte Makan), cardiac arrest.
- Svetlana Zhiltsova, 89, Russian television presenter.

=== 4 ===
- Odílio Balbinotti, 84, Brazilian politician, deputy (1995–2015), complications from Alzheimer's disease.
- François Beukelaers, 88, Belgian actor (Brussels by Night, The Over-the-Hill Band, Stormforce), stage director and singer.
- Nogueira de Brito, 88, Portuguese politician, deputy (1983–1995).
- Corrado Carnevale, 95, Italian jurist, judge of the Supreme Court of Cassation (1985–1993).
- Tommy Crook, 81, American guitarist.
- Malcolm Ferguson-Smith, 94, British geneticist.
- Wojciech Gryniewicz, 79, Polish sculptor.
- Danny Hale, 84, Northern Irish footballer (Dundalk, Derry City).
- Leo Hilokoski, 84, Finnish bowler.
- Ed Iskenderian, 104, American Hall of Fame hot rodder and businessman.
- Marlies Krämer, 88, German feminist activist and politician.
- Abdul Latif, 86, Bangladeshi cricket player (East Pakistan) and manager (national team).
- Bill Loewen, 95, Canadian businessman, philanthropist and political activist.
- John Lofland, 79, American sociologist (Doomsday Cult: A Study of Conversion, Proselytization, and Maintenance of Faith).
- Bjørn Lofterød, 76, Norwegian Olympic sailor (1968, 1972).
- Mickey Lolich, 85, American baseball player (Detroit Tigers, San Diego Padres, New York Mets), World Series champion (1968).
- Tōsha Meishō, 84, Japanese hayashi musician.
- Mario Merlino, 81, Italian neo-fascist activist (National Vanguard).
- Lloyd Monsen, 94, American soccer player (New York Americans, national team).
- Ernest Morrell, 54, American scholar and music executive, cancer.
- Morishige Naruse, 92, Japanese politician, member of the House of Councillors (1989–2001).
- Lajos Ódor, 65, Hungarian Olympic rower (1980).
- Margalit Oved, 96, American-Israeli dancer and choreographer.
- Tomàs Pladevall, 79, Spanish cinematographer (El Sopar, Train of Shadows, Leo).
- Charles Poindexter, 83, American politician, member of the Virginia House of Delegates (2008–2022).
- Thuraya Qabil, 85, Saudi Arabian poet.
- Jorge Ruffinelli, 82, Uruguayan literary critic and academic.
- Elyakim Schlesinger, 104, Austrian-born British Orthodox rabbi.
- Ricardo Schnetzer, 72, Brazilian voice actor, complications from amyotrophic lateral sclerosis.
- Zohar Shavit, 74, Israeli scholar, author and translator.
- Igal Talmi, 101, Ukrainian-born Israeli nuclear physicist.
- Lorenza Trucchi, 104, Italian art critic.
- John Virgo, 79, English snooker player, ruptured aorta.
- Julian Wojtkowski, 99, Polish Roman Catholic prelate and theologian, auxiliary bishop of Warmia (1969–2004).

=== 5 ===
- Luc-Russel Adjaho, Togolese evangelical pastor.
- Antonio Arregui Yarza, 86, Spanish-born Ecuadorian Roman Catholic prelate, auxiliary bishop of Quito (1990–2005), bishop of Ibarra (1995–2003), and archbishop of Guayaquil (2003–2015).
- Janina Borońska, 82, Polish actress (How I Unleashed World War II, More Than Life at Stake).
- Daniel Boyd, 69, American filmmaker and academic.
- Greg Brown, 56, American musician (Cake, Deathray) and songwriter ("The Distance").
- Franz Ceska, 90, Austrian diplomat, ambassador to France (1997–2001), permanent representative to the UN (1988–1991).
- Alevtina Fedulova, 85, Russian politician, MP (1993–1995).
- Eladio González Garza, 89, Mexican voice actor.
- Jeff Griffin, 81, American politician, mayor of Reno, Nevada (1995–2002).
- Ray Handley, 81, American football coach (New York Giants).
- Marian Jeż, 84, Polish politician, MP (1989–1991).
- Joachim Kempin, 83, German businessman (Microsoft).
- Vardan Khachatryan, 66, Armenian politician, minister of finance (2000–2008).
- Vladimir Kuroyedov, 81, Russian admiral, commander-in-chief of the Navy (1997–2005).
- Henry G. Lackey, 78, American politician, member of the Kentucky Senate (1982–1987, 1991–1995).
- Lennart Lind, 95, Swedish Olympic pole vaulter (1952).
- Pentti Lindegren, 86, Finnish ice hockey player (HIFK, AIK IF) and commentator.
- Joana Lopes, 87, Portuguese systems engineer and activist.
- Richard W. Mansbach, 83, American political scientist.
- Tommy McMillan, 81, Scottish footballer (Aberdeen, Falkirk).
- Helen Micallef, 75, Maltese singer (Helen and Joseph).
- Troy Poteete, 70, American Cherokee politician, shot.
- Cesare Ruperto, 100, Italian judge, justice (1993–2002) and president (2001–2002) of the constitutional court.
- Thanasis Skourtopoulos, 60, Greek basketball player (AEK Athens) and coach (national team), heart attack.
- Fred Smith, 77, American bassist (Television, Blondie), cancer.
- Alan Trustman, 95, American screenwriter (Bullitt, The Thomas Crown Affair, They Call Me Mister Tibbs!).
- Tamás Vásáry, 92, Hungarian pianist and conductor (Bournemouth Sinfonietta, Hungarian Radio Symphony Orchestra).
- Henry Viccellio Jr., 85, American Air Force general.
- Ken Weetch, 92, British politician, MP (1974–1987).
- Stanley Zdonik, 78, American computer scientist and academic.

=== 6 ===
- Afleet Alex, 23, American Thoroughbred racehorse, Preakness Stakes winner (2005), Belmont Stakes winner (2005), euthanized.
- Assad Ali, 88, Syrian literary critic and academic.
- Pierangelo Belli, 81, Italian footballer (Milan, Verona, Legnano).
- François Blamont, 81, French businessman.
- Alberto Bourdillón, 82, Argentine Olympic swimmer (1964).
- Jana Brejchová, 86, Czech actress (Higher Principle, I Killed Einstein, Gentlemen, The Fabulous Baron Munchausen).
- John Burton, 85, British political agent.
- Damien Byrne, 71, Irish footballer (Drogheda United, St Patrick's Athletic).
- Jeffrey Carver, 76, American science fiction author (The Rapture Effect).
- Đoàn Duy Thành, 96, Vietnamese politician, deputy chairman of the Council of Ministers (1987–1988).
- Nevin Efe, 78, Turkish actress (Valley of the Wolves: Ambush, Aşk ve Ceza, Arka Sokaklar).
- Vince Fawcett, 55, English rugby league player (Leeds, Workington Town, Parramatta Eels).
- Pietro Gabrielli, 94, Italian Roman Catholic prelate, vicar apostolic of Méndez (1993–2008).
- Blessed Geza, 82–83, Zimbabwean politician and war veteran, cancer.
- Terrance Gore, 34, American baseball player (Kansas City Royals, Chicago Cubs, Atlanta Braves), World Series champion (2015, 2021), complications from surgery.
- Sonny Jurgensen, 91, American Hall of Fame football player (Philadelphia Eagles, Washington Redskins), NFL champion (1960).
- Éva Keleti, 94, Hungarian photographer.
- Nezamoddin Kiaie, 81, Iranian sound engineer (A Moment of Innocence, I'm Not Angry!).
- Hellmut Lorenz, 83, Austrian art historian.
- Salvatore Mazzaracchio, 92, Italian politician, deputy (2006–2008), senator (2008–2013).
- Microwave Dave, 79, American blues musician.
- Zsuzsanna Ozsváth, 94, Hungarian-American author and translator.
- Bruno Parma, 84, Slovene chess grandmaster.
- Antonia Pemberton, 98–99, British actress (Enemy at the Door, A Passage to India, Agatha Christie's Poirot).
- Robert J. Plemmons, 87, American mathematician, cancer.
- George R. Rossman, 81, American mineralogist and academic.
- Sein Win, 81, Burmese politician, prime minister of NCGUB (1990–2012).
- John Wheeler, 95, American actor (Sgt. Pepper's Lonely Hearts Club Band, The Dukes of Hazzard, Green Acres).
- Barry Wilburn, 62, American football player (Washington Redskins, Philadelphia Eagles), injuries sustained in a house fire.

=== 7 ===
- Benny Indra Ardhianto, 33, Indonesian politician and businessman, vice regent of Klaten (since 2025), cancer.
- Brad Arnold, 47, American singer (3 Doors Down) and songwriter ("Kryptonite", "Here Without You"), renal cell carcinoma.
- Stasys Baranauskas, 63, Lithuanian footballer (Hapoel Petah Tikva, Kareda Siauliai, national team).
- Gary Blaylock, 94, American baseball player (St. Louis Cardinals, New York Yankees) and coach (Kansas City Royals).
- Bert Broekhuis, 82, Dutch politician, MP (1981–1982).
- Manolín Bueno, 86, Spanish footballer (Real Madrid, Sevilla, Cádiz).
- Matti Caspi, 76, Israeli singer-songwriter, cancer.
- Mike Cruise, 78, British astronomer, president of the Royal Astronomical Society (2018–2020).
- Des de Moor, 64, English writer and musician, brain tumour.
- Dave Ellis, 88, Canadian Olympic runner (1968).
- Nico de Haan, 78, Dutch birdwatcher and television presenter.
- David J. Farber, 91, American computer scientist (SNOBOL).
- John Flanagan, 81, Australian fantasy author (Ranger's Apprentice).
- Jeane Freeman, 72, Scottish businesswoman and politician, MSP (2016–2021) and cabinet secretary for health and sport (2018–2021).
- Jesús Fuentes Lázaro, 79, Spanish politician, president of Castilla-La Mancha (1982–1983).
- Masashi Furukawa, 90, Japanese politician, MP (1969–1990).
- Kåre Grøttum, 92, Norwegian jazz pianist and composer.
- Horst Helle, 91, German sociologist and academic.
- Viktor Kurochkin, 72, Russian politician, senator (1994–1996), MP (1995–2000).
- Adriano Lima, 52, Brazilian swimmer, Paralympic champion (2004), bone cancer.
- Clyde Maughan, 99, American electrical engineer.
- Syed Mohammad Nizami, Indian Muslim scholar.
- Beresford Parlett, 93, English applied mathematician.
- Robert del Picchia, 83, French politician, senator (1998–2021).
- Koit Pikaro, 76, Estonian politician, MP (1999–2007).
- Ramesh Chandra Sen, 85, Bangladeshi politician, MP (2009–2024) and minister of water resources (2009–2014).
- Sander Severino, 40, Filipino chess player, heart failure.
- Shao Yu-ming, 87, Taiwanese politician, director-general of the Government Information Office (1987–1991).
- Matz Skoog, 68, Swedish ballet dancer and artistic director, cancer.
- William B. Steele, 96, American major general.
- Francis Takirwa, 60, Ugandan general.
- Ebo Taylor, 90, Ghanaian musician and producer.
- Cabell Tennis, 93, American Episcopal prelate, bishop of Delaware (1986–1997).
- Sunil Thapa, 68, Nepali actor (Mary Kom, Prem Geet 3), cardiac arrest.
- Léopoldine Tiézan Coffie, 75, Ivorian politician, cardiac arrest.
- Nora Uribe, 87–88, Venezuelan politician and diplomat, minister of communication and information (2002–2003).
- Eleftherios Venizelos, 101, Greek politician, MP (1952–1958).
- Gabriel P. Weisberg, 83, American art historian and educator.
- Brian Westlake, 82, English footballer (Halifax Town, Colchester United, Tranmere Rovers).

=== 8 ===
- Eli Alaluf, 80, Moroccan-born Israeli politician, MK (2015–2019).
- Eric Allan, 85, British actor (The Archers, The McKenzie Break, Bleak Moments).
- Eddy Antoine, 76, Haitian footballer (Racing Haïtien, Chicago Sting, national team).
- Angelo Attaguile, 78, Italian politician, deputy (2013–2018).
- Jorge Babu, 60, Brazilian politician, Rio de Janeiro MLA (2007–2011).
- W. Meredith Bacon, 79, American political scientist and LGBT rights activist.
- Enrico Benzing, 93, Italian journalist (La Gazzetta dello Sport, Il Giornale), engineer and author.
- Chen Bangzhu, 91, Chinese politician, governor of Hunan (1989–1994) and chairman of the Committee of Population, Resources and Environment (2000–2008).
- Phil Blazer, 89, American football player (Buffalo Bills).
- Lynn Bolles, 76, American anthropologist, heart failure.
- Patrizia De Blanck, 85, Italian television personality.
- Owen Donohoe, 80, American politician, member of the Kansas House of Representatives (2007–2013, 2019–2024).
- David Federman, 81, Israeli stockbroker and basketball club owner (Maccabi Tel Aviv).
- Terry Fields, 66, American politician, member of the Florida House of Representatives (2000–2008).
- Kirk Francis, 78, American sound engineer (The Bourne Ultimatum, L.A. Confidential, The Tree of Life), Oscar winner (2008).
- Blake Garrett, 33, American actor (How to Eat Fried Worms), accidental fentanyl overdose.
- Tadamasa Goto, 83, Japanese crime boss.
- Beka Gotsiridze, 37, Georgian footballer (Ameri Tbilisi, Zestaponi, national team).
- Hannah Henry, 26, Canadian triathlete, traffic collision.
- Jung Jin-woo, 88, South Korean film director (Oyster Village, Adultery Tree) and producer (Woman of Fire), complications from a fall and COVID-19.
- Jon Kudelka, 53, Australian cartoonist, glioblastoma.
- Lucien Larré, 93, Canadian Roman Catholic priest.
- Giulio Lepschy, 91, Italian linguist.
- Edward Linde-Lubaszenko, 86, Polish actor (Rose, Soldiers of Freedom, Schindler's List).
- Erkki Nghimtina, 78, Namibian politician, MP (1995–2020), minister of defence (1997–2005) and labour (2015–2020).
- Franco Nuovo, 72, Canadian journalist and television presenter, cardiac arrest.
- Aaron Pegram, 51, American operatic tenor.
- Victor Sarusi, 81, Israeli footballer (Maccabi Netanya, Beitar Jerusalem, national team).
- Frans Verhaegen, 78, Belgian racing cyclist.
- Wai Kee-shun, 92, Hong Kong newspaper proprietor, sports administrator and television host (City Forum).
- Agus Widjojo, 78, Indonesian military officer and diplomat.
- Kazimierz Wielikosielec, 80, Belarusian Roman Catholic prelate, auxiliary bishop of Pinsk (1999–2024).
- Tadao Yasuda, 62, Japanese rikishi and professional wrestler (NJPW).

=== 9 ===
- Fazail Agamali, 78, Azerbaijani politician, MNA (1995–2024) and acting minister of labour and social protection of the population (1993–1994).
- Charles Bailleul, 98, French linguist and missionary (White Fathers).
- Alex Caldiero, 76, American poet, heart attack.
- Robert Daverman, 84, American topologist.
- Giancarlo Dettori, 93, Italian actor (Quattro bravi ragazzi, My Sister in Law, Damned the Day I Met You).
- William Flatt, 94, American animal and nutritional scientist.
- Riccardo Fontana, 79, Italian Roman Catholic prelate, archbishop of Spoleto-Norcia (1996–2009) and archbishop-bishop of Arezzo-Cortona-Sansepolcro (2009–2022).
- Philippe Gaulier, 82, French clown, dramatist and theatre professor, complications from a lung infection.
- Chris Gilbert, 79, American Hall of Fame football player (Texas Longhorns).
- Garland Green, 83, American soul singer and pianist.
- Jesús Guillera, 70, Spanish mathematician.
- Bobby Henrich, 87, American baseball player (Cincinnati Redlegs/Reds).
- Phil Krueger, 74, American racing driver.
- Eldon Lautermilch, 76, Canadian politician, Saskatchewan MLA (1986–2007), complications from amyotrophic lateral sclerosis.
- Seshagiri Mallampati, 85, Indian anesthesiologist (Mallampati score).
- Don Nigro, 76, American playwright.
- Genrikh Padva, 94, Russian lawyer.
- Phylia Nwamitwa II, 86, South African traditional ruler, MP (1994–2009).
- András Riedlmayer, 79, Hungarian-born American art historian.
- Jim Robson, 91, Canadian Hall of Fame sportscaster (Vancouver Canucks).
- Don Schlitten, 93, American jazz record producer.
- Tracy Scroggins, 56, American football player (Detroit Lions).
- Pekka Vennamo, 81, Finnish politician, MP (1972–1975, 1979–1989) and minister of transport (1987–1989), complications from surgery.
- Lynton Wilson, 85, Canadian businessman, chancellor of McMaster University (2007–2013).
- Antonino Zichichi, 96, Italian physicist, president of the INFN (1977–1983) and EPS (1978–1980), co-founder of the EMFCSC.

=== 10 ===
- Vasco Ascolini, 88, Italian photographer.
- Femke Boersma, 90, Dutch actress (Het Wonderlijke leven van Willem Parel, Pastorale 1943).
- Lina Brockdorff, 95, Maltese author, playwright and radio broadcaster.
- Ed Crane, 81, American libertarian activist, co-founder of the Cato Institute, heart failure.
- Sir Selwyn Cushing, 89, New Zealand businessman.
- Alifereti Dere, 64, Fijian rugby union player (national team) and coach (national sevens).
- Shelly Desai, 90, American actor (Men of a Certain Age, Here Comes the Boom, It's Always Sunny in Philadelphia).
- Anne Gambrill, 91, New Zealand lawyer and judge, master of the High Court of New Zealand (1987–2002).
- Henric Holmberg, 80, Swedish actor, director and screenwriter.
- Shutaro Iida, 52, Japanese video game programmer (Castlevania: Aria of Sorrow, Castlevania: Portrait of Ruin) and director (Bloodstained: Ritual of the Night), cancer.
- Abdul Mannan Khan, 73, Bangladeshi politician, MP (2009–2013).
- King T. Leatherbury, 92, American Hall of Fame racehorse trainer (Ben's Cat).
- James Manclark, 86, British Olympic luger (1968).
- Antonio Mereu, 83, Italian politician, deputy (2001–2013).
- Michael Mullett, 82, British historian and academic.
- Júlio Soares de Moura Neto, 82, Brazilian naval officer, commander of the Navy (2007–2015).
- Takamitsu Muraoka, 88, Japanese linguist.
- Andrew Ranken, 72, English drummer (The Pogues).
- Tessa Richards, 75, British physician, adrenal cancer.
- José Luis Russo, 67, Uruguayan footballer (Defensor, Deportes Tolima, national team).
- Screaming Mad George, 69, Japanese makeup artist and special effects artist (Predator, The Abyss, Big Trouble in Little China), cardiac arrest.
- Otto Šimko, 101, Slovak jurist and Holocaust survivor.
- Mark Smith, 51, American football player (Arizona Cardinals, Cleveland Browns).
- Serge Stresser, 72, French Olympic weightlifter (1976).
- Yesen Taskynbayev, 93, Kazakh politician, deputy of the Supreme Soviet of the Kazakh SSR (1971–1989).
- Marie-Rose Tessier, 115, French supercentenarian.
- Nambatingue Toko, 73, Chadian footballer (Paris Saint-Germain, Nice, national team).
- Eve Uusmees, 89, Estonian Olympic swimmer (1960).
- Jose de Venecia Jr., 89, Filipino politician, speaker (1992–1998, 2001–2008) and three-time member of the House of Representatives.

=== 11 ===
- Dario Antiseri, 86, Italian philosopher.
- Kanbolat Görkem Arslan, 45, Turkish actor (Kuruluş: Osman, Poyraz Karayel, Destan), heart attack.
- Dean G. Auten, 88, American politician, member of the Georgia House of Representatives (1977–1986).
- Pip Cheshire, 75, New Zealand architect, president of the New Zealand Institute of Architects (2014–2016).
- Theodore Seio Chihara, 96, American mathematician.
- Edwin G. Corr, 91, American diplomat, ambassador to Peru (1980–1981), Bolivia (1981–1985) and El Salvador (1985–1988).
- Bud Cort, 77, American actor (Harold and Maude, Brewster McCloud, The Life Aquatic with Steve Zissou), pneumonia.
- Jeffrey Evangelos, 73, American politician, member of the Maine House of Representatives (2012–2016, 2018–2022).
- Christoph Luitpold Frommel, 92, German art historian.
- Ed Graczyk, 84, American playwright (Come Back to the 5 & Dime, Jimmy Dean, Jimmy Dean).
- Eddie Harty, 88, Irish Olympic equestrian (1960) and National Hunt jockey, heart failure.
- Biodun Jeyifo, 80, Nigerian literary critic and scholar, president of the ASUU (1980–1982).
- Jung Eun-woo, 39, South Korean actor (Five Fingers, One Well-Raised Daughter, The Return of Hwang Geum-bok).
- Qallibek Kamolov, 99, Uzbek politician, first secretary of the Karakalpak Regional Committee of the Communist Party of Uzbekistan (1963–1984).
- Jerry Kennedy, 85, American record producer, songwriter and guitarist.
- George Quincey Lumsden Jr., 95, American diplomat, ambassador to the United Arab Emirates (1982–1986).
- Émilie Manima, 89, Congolese politician.
- Sandra Mendoza, 62, Argentine politician, deputy (2009–2017).
- Peter Meyer, 85, German footballer (Fortuna Düsseldorf, Borussia Mönchengladbach, West Germany national team).
- Toshio Motoya, 82, Japanese hospitality executive, founder and chairman of APA Group.
- Jenő Murádin, 88, Romanian art historian and academic.
- Cees Nooteboom, 92, Dutch novelist (Rituals, The Following Story, All Souls' Day), poet and journalist.
- William Nyhan, 99, American physician (Lesch–Nyhan syndrome).
- Michael Proctor, 58, American football player (Murray State Racers, Saskatchewan Roughriders).
- Alfio Rapisarda, 92, Italian Roman Catholic prelate, apostolic nuncio to Bolivia (1979–1985), Brazil (1992–2002), and Portugal (2002–2008).
- Helmuth Rilling, 92, German choral conductor (Gächinger Kantorei, Oregon Bach Festival, Internationale Bachakademie Stuttgart).
- Tânia Rodrigues, 75, Brazilian politician, Rio de Janeiro MLA (1995–2003, 2015–2019).
- László Somfai, 91, Hungarian musicologist.
- David Heywood Swartz, 83, American diplomat, ambassador to Belarus (1992–1994).
- Nikolay Tikhomirov, 74, Russian politician, senator (2012–2019).
- Marc van Belkum, 61, Dutch Olympic water polo player (1992).
- James Van Der Beek, 48, American actor (Dawson's Creek, Varsity Blues, The Rules of Attraction), colorectal cancer.
- Jocelyn Wardrop-Moore, 93, British Olympic alpine skier (1956).
- Viktor Zaporozhets, 78, Ukrainian Olympic boxer (1968).

=== 12 ===
- Xesús Alonso Montero, 97, Spanish writer, specialist in Galician literature, president of the Royal Galician Academy (2013–2017).
- María Elena Álvarez Bernal, 95, Mexican politician, senator (1997–2000) and four-term deputy.
- Dani Arditi, 75, Israeli military officer.
- Gordon Brown, 95, English rugby league player (Leeds, Great Britain).
- George Bunting, 81, American politician, member of the Delaware Senate (1996–2013).
- Alfred Chen, 88, Taiwanese businessman and politician, MP (2004–2005).
- Pat Collins, 84, American football coach (Northeast Louisiana Indians).
- Jacques Dubois, 92, Belgian literary theorist and academic.
- Bożena Dykiel, 77, Polish actress (The War of the Worlds: Next Century, The Quack, Holy Week).
- Liane Engeman, 81, Dutch racing driver (Formula Vee).
- Patricio Etcheverry, 83, Chilean Olympic javelin thrower (1964).
- Roy Face, 97, American baseball player (Pittsburgh Pirates, Montreal Expos, Detroit Tigers), World Series champion (1960).
- Fan Tsung-pei, 65, Taiwanese cellist and composer, heart attack.
- Giovanni Fazio, 92, American physicist.
- Geraldine Fenton, Canadian ice dancer.
- Lionel Fogarty, 68, Australian indigenous poet and political activist.
- Jacques Gaillard, 77, French writer and Latinist.
- Lucien Ghellynck, 82, Belgian footballer (Gent).
- Juhan Habicht, 72, Estonian translator and writer.
- Elly Idris, 63, Indonesian football player (Persita Tangerang, national team) and manager.
- Ömer Kaner, 74, Turkish football player (Fenerbahçe, national team) and manager (Denizlispor).
- Fredric Kroll, 81, American-German composer and writer.
- Vangie Labalan, 83, Filipino actress (Manila by Night, Himala, Bobo Cop) and comedian.
- Sarla Maheshwari, 71, Indian journalist (DD National).
- Milkman, 36, Mexican rapper, producer and composer.
- Joe Nossek, 85, American baseball player (Minnesota Twins) and coach.
- Esa Pakarinen Jr., 78, Finnish actor (The Year of the Hare, Poet and Muse, Koeputkiaikuinen ja Simon enkelit).
- Palmerston, 11–12, British cat, chief mouser to the Foreign, Commonwealth and Development Office (2016–2020).
- Anastasios Papaligouras, 77, Greek politician, MP (1981–2009), minister of justice (2004–2007) and marine and island policy (2007–2009).
- Michel Portal, 90, French composer, saxophonist and clarinetist.
- Marian Potograbski, Polish writer.
- Mirakbar Rahmonqulov, 73, Uzbek politician, senator (since 2020).
- John Shirreffs, 80, American racehorse trainer (Giacomo, Zenyatta, A.P. Warrior).
- Joe Simon, 78, Indian film director (Simha Jodi, Sahasa Simha, Maha Purusha), heart attack.
- Walter Wise, 74, American labor union leader.

=== 13 ===
- Josefina Aguilar, 80, Mexican folk artist.
- Qamar Ali Akhoon, 68, Indian politician, Jammu and Kashmir MLA (1996–2003, 2008–2014).
- Christian Astuguevieille, 79, French artist, designer and perfumer.
- Brahim Bahrir, 47–48, French convicted terrorist, shot.
- Michael Canavan, 79, American lieutenant general.
- Paulette Collet, 99, Belgian essayist and academic.
- Donald Leo Dietmeyer, 93, American electrical engineer.
- Nicolas Grimaldi, 92, French philosopher.
- Ignacy Guenther, 89, Polish politician, MP (1989–1991).
- Joseph Halpern, 72, Israeli-born American computer scientist, cancer.
- Lambert Hamel, 85, German actor (The Aggression).
- Simon Harris, 63, British music producer, DJ and electronic musician.
- Tatjana Ječmenica, 47, Serbian tennis player, traffic collision.
- William C. Leggett, 86, Canadian population biologist and university administrator.
- Kahnu Charan Lenka, 86, Indian politician, MP (1988–1994).
- Mutumba Mainga, 88, Zambian historian and politician.
- Roy Medvedev, 100, Russian politician, Soviet dissident and writer (Let History Judge).
- José Álvaro Moisés, 80, Brazilian political scientist, drowned.
- Dolores Muñoz Ledo, 107, Mexican voice actress.
- Zaeem Qadri, 61, Pakistani politician, Punjab MPA (2008–2018).
- James Specht, 80–81, American agronomist.
- Terry Stratton, 87, Canadian politician, senator (1993–2013).
- Frans Van Vlierberghe, 71, Belgian racing cyclist.
- Tissa Vitharana, 91, Sri Lankan politician, governor of North Central Province (2019–2020), minister of technology (2004–2010), and twice MP.
- Alice Wingwall, 90, American photographer and sculptor.

=== 14 ===
- Faʻaolesa Katopau Ainuʻu, 62, Samoan jurist and politician, MP (2016–2021) and minister of justice (2016–2021).
- Harry Bean, 71, American politician, member of the New Hampshire House of Representatives (since 2018).
- Ivar Bjørklund, 76, Norwegian anthropologist and writer.
- Eddie Carvery, 79, Canadian social activist.
- Nurcan Çelik, 46, Turkish football player (VfL Wolfsburg, Dostluk Spor, national team) and manager.
- Michel Charrel, 89, French actor (Fort du Fou, Fantômas).
- Elaine J. Coates, 88, American social worker and educator.
- Coca Boom, 28, Spanish drag queen.
- Richard de Prémare, 89, French painter.
- Edward L. Deci, 83, American psychologist.
- Quentin Deranque, 23, French far-right activist, injuries from a beating.
- Marcelo Dotti, 83, Ecuadorian politician, deputy (1994–1996, 1998–2006) and Andean parliamentarian (2007).
- John Fraser, 90, Australian tennis player.
- Susan George, 91, American-French political and social scientist, activist and writer.
- Xhelil Gjoni, 87, Albanian politician, MP (1991–1992).
- Lowell Green, 89, Canadian radio personality.
- David Harpp, 89, American chemist and science communicator.
- Sheikh Kabir Hossain, 84, Bangladeshi insurance executive.
- Mevlüt Kaplan, 95, Turkish writer.
- Dóra Maurer, 88, Hungarian visual artist.
- Henrike Naumann, 41, German sculptor, cancer.
- Tom Noonan, 74, American actor (Manhunter, Synecdoche, New York, Damages).
- Serhiy Petrov, 28, Ukrainian footballer (Volyn Lutsk, Ahrobiznes Volochysk, Zirka Kropyvnytskyi), killed in action.
- Anna Ranalli, 84, Italian singer, actress (I 4 tassisti, Medusa Against the Son of Hercules) and model (Miss Europe 1960).
- Joe Randall, 79, American chef.
- Orazio Russo, 52, Italian footballer (Catania, Acireale, Lecce), leukaemia.
- Michael Silverblatt, 73, American literary critic and broadcaster (Bookworm).
- Erhard Stiefel, 85, Swiss mask maker.
- Joe Stowell, 99, American basketball player and coach (Bradley Braves).
- Bishwa Bandhu Thapa, 98, Nepalese politician, MP (1959–1960) and chairman of the Rastriya Panchayat (1963–1964).
- Green Vigo, 75, South African rugby league player (Wigan Warriors).
- Bogusław Wąs, 73, Polish politician, MP (1989–1991).
- Ray Webster, 79, New Zealand-born British businessman, chief executive of easyJet (1996–2005).
- Trevor Wilson, 75, Australian footballer (Richmond, Footscray).

=== 15 ===
- Enayatollah Bakhshi, 80, Iranian actor (Reign of Love, All That Is, Tangna), lung infection.
- Anna Benaki-Psarouda, 91, Greek politician, speaker of parliament (2004–2007), minister of justice (1992–1993) and twice of culture.
- Blue Prize, 13, Argentine Thoroughbred horse, complications from foaling.
- Paul Brainerd, 78, American businessman (Aldus Corporation).
- Bruno Cipolla, 73, Italian rower, Olympic champion (1968).
- Pino Colizzi, 88, Italian actor (Jesus of Nazareth, Tea with Mussolini, La piovra) and voice actor.
- Neal Dahlen, 85, American football executive (Denver Broncos) and administrator (Denver Broncos, San Francisco 49ers).
- Robert Duvall, 95, American actor (The Godfather, Apocalypse Now, Tender Mercies), Oscar winner (1984).
- Dana Eden, 52, Israeli television producer (Tehran).
- Pol Greisch, 95, Luxembourgish actor and writer.
- Roger Hverven, 81, Norwegian Olympic handball player (1972).
- Tre' Johnson, 54, American football player (Washington Redskins, Cleveland Browns).
- Benni Korzen, 87, Danish film producer (Babette's Feast), Oscar winner (1987).
- Seumas McSporran, 88, Scottish multiple worker.
- Michael Page, 84, English cricketer (Derbyshire).
- Renato Rabelo, 83, Brazilian politician and physician.
- Guenter B. Risse, 93, American medical historian.
- Abdallah Sadouk, 75, Moroccan painter and engraver.
- Melitón Sánchez Rivas, 91, Panamanian sports executive, member of IOC (1998–2014).
- Kazue Sawai, 85, Japanese musician.
- Moufed Mahmoud Shehab, 90, Egyptian politician.
- Goran Sukno, 66, Croatian water polo player, Olympic champion (1984).
- Peter Tasiri, 95, Ghanaian revolutionary and politician, member of the Armed Forces Revolutionary Council (1979).
- Maria Vagatova, 89, Russian poet.
- John Viola, 75, American politician, member of the Delaware House of Representatives (1998–2020).
- Christopher S. Wren, 89, American journalist (The New York Times) and author.
- Bitokotipou Yagninim, 84, Togolese politician, minister of justice (1990) and senator (since 2025).

=== 16 ===
- Hélène Ahrweiler, 99, Greek-French Byzantologist.
- Jane Baer, 91, American animator (Who Framed Roger Rabbit, The Black Cauldron, Rover Dangerfield).
- George W. Barber, 85, American museum owner and philanthropist.
- Harry Barnes, 89, English politician, MP (1987–2005), cancer.
- Ancella Bickley, 95, American historian.
- Thomas De Koninck, 91, Canadian philosopher.
- Juan Carlos Desanzo, 88, Argentine film director (Eva Perón: The True Story, El amor y el espanto), screenwriter and cinematographer (Funes, a Great Love).
- Consty Eka, 56, Cameroonian television presenter and businessman.
- Nicola Fear, 56, British epidemiologist, cancer.
- Semyon Gluzman, 79, Ukrainian psychiatrist and human rights activist.
- Avel Gordly, 79, American politician, member of the Oregon Senate (1997–2009).
- Carl Grillmair, 67, Canadian astronomer and astrophysicist, shot.
- Bob Howes, 83, Canadian football player (Edmonton Eskimos, BC Lions).
- Elaine Ingham, 73, American microbiologist.
- Brett Jones, 69, American songwriter.
- Bo Lamar, 74, American basketball player (Southwestern Louisiana Ragin' Cajuns, San Diego Conquistadors, Los Angeles Lakers).
- Jim Lane, 88, Irish republican and socialist.
- King Liu, 91, Taiwanese bicycle manufacturer, founder of Giant Bicycles.
- Gail R. Martin, 81, American biologist.
- Gérard Mathieu, 78, Belgian politician, Walloon deputy (1995–2004).
- Richard Ottinger, 97, American politician and lawyer, member of the U.S. House of Representatives (1965–1971, 1975–1985), dean of the Pace University School of Law (1994–1999).
- Raseswari Panigrahi, 79, Indian politician, Odisha MLA (2014–2019).
- Wolfram Saenger, 86, German biochemist, crystallographer and academic.
- Linda Seger, 80, American author and script consultant, breast cancer.
- Lélio Souza, 88, Brazilian politician, Rio Grande do Sul MLA (1971–1983), deputy (1983–1991).
- Billy Steinberg, 75, American songwriter ("Like a Virgin", "True Colors", "Eternal Flame"), cancer.
- Robin Stevens, 67, British composer and cellist, cancer.
- Frederick Wiseman, 96, American filmmaker (Titicut Follies, Welfare, In Jackson Heights).
- Guido A. Zäch, 90, Swiss politician, MP (1999–2003).

=== 17 ===
- Firmin Ayessa, 74, Congolese politician, MP (since 2002).
- Dmitry Bavilsky, 57, Russian writer, literary critic and journalist.
- Malcolm Budd, 84, English philosopher, Alzheimer's disease.
- Jim Čert, 69, Czech singer and accordionist.
- Miquel Clar Lladó, 87, Spanish businessman and politician, member of the Parliament of the Balearic Islands (1984–1987), mayor of Llucmajor (1979–1983).
- Mohsen Dalloul, 92, Lebanese journalist and politician, minister of agriculture (1989–1992) and defense (1992–1995).
- Wolfgang F. Danspeckgruber, 70, Austrian-born American academic.
- Anna dePeyster, 81, British-Australian journalist and author.
- Pravina Deshpande, 60, Indian actress (Ready, Ek Villain, Jalebi), blood cancer.
- Charlotte Gere, 88, British art historian.
- Patricia Grayburn, 95, British arts administrator.
- David Hays, 95, American scenic and lighting designer.
- Edward Hoagland, 93, American author (Heart's Desire).
- Cliff Hucul, 79, Canadian racing driver (Indianapolis 500).
- Jesse Jackson, 84, American civil rights activist and politician, founder of Rainbow/PUSH.
- William Milam, 89, American diplomat, ambassador to Bangladesh (1990–1993) and Pakistan (1998–2001).
- Doug Moe, 87, American basketball player (Oakland Oaks, Carolina Cougars) and coach (Denver Nuggets), complications from cancer.
- Ray Reach, 77, American musician, composer and convicted pedophile.
- Ngari Rinpoche, 79, Tibetan tulku and politician.
- Susan Sheehan, 88, American author (Is There No Place on Earth for Me?).
- Shinya, 56, Japanese musician (Luna Sea), cancer.
- Richard Stika, 68, American Roman Catholic prelate, bishop of Knoxville (2009–2023).
- Scott Tinsley, 62, American football coach (West Virginia State Yellow Jackets, West Virginia Tech Golden Bears).
- Frank Tittel, 92, German-born British-American laser physicist.
- José van Dam, 85, Belgian operatic bass-baritone.
- Veikko Virtanen, 97, Finnish organ builder.

=== 18 ===
- Béatrice Ardisson, 62, French composer, cancer.
- Chester Clem, 88, American politician, member of the Florida House of Representatives (1972–1976).
- Roy Ellam, 83, English football player (Huddersfield Town, Bradford City, Mossley) and manager.
- Norman Francis, 94, American academic administrator, president of Xavier University of Louisiana (1968–2015) and chairman of the Louisiana Recovery Authority.
- Boris Frlec, 90, Slovenian politician, minister of foreign affairs (1997–2000).
- Karen Glaser, 71, American underwater photographer, complications from Parkinson’s disease.
- Roger von Gunten, 92, Swiss-born Mexican painter.
- Nicolaas Marinus Hugenholtz, 101, Dutch physicist.
- Hidé Ishiguro, 94–95, Japanese philosopher and academic.
- Svein Jarvoll, 79, Norwegian writer.
- Christian Jidayi, 38, Italian footballer (Forlì, Bellaria-Igea, VdA St.Christophe).
- Deo A. Koenigs, 91, American politician.
- Orland Larson, 94, Canadian goldsmith and metalsmith.
- Mimmo Liguoro, 84, Italian journalist (TG2, TG3).
- Lil Poppa, 25, American rapper, suicide by gunshot.
- Antonis Manitakis, 81, Greek politician, minister of the interior (2012, 2015) and administrative reform (2012–2013).
- Carl Marcellino, 83, American politician, member of the New York Senate (1995–2018).
- Karim al-Mulla, 83, Iraqi politician, minister of youth (1977–1982).
- Philippe Mvouo, 74, Congolese politician.
- Trevor Oakes, 79, English guitarist (Showaddywaddy) and songwriter.
- Borislav Paravac, 83, Bosnian Serb politician, Serb member (2003–2006) and chairman (2003, 2004–2005) of the Presidency.
- Sepp Piontek, 85, German football player (Werder Bremen, West Germany national team) and manager (Denmark national team).
- Mykola Prystay, 71, Ukrainian football player (Prykarpattia Ivano-Frankivsk) and manager (LUKOR Kalush, Enerhetyk Burshtyn).
- Margot Queitsch, 79, German politician, member of the Landtag of Baden-Württemberg (2001–2011).
- Michael F. Robinson, 92, English composer, musicologist and academic.
- Leila Shahid, 76, Palestinian diplomat.
- Clem Sunter, 81, South African futurist.
- Jan Timman, 74, Dutch chess grandmaster.
- Eugène Tremblay, 89, Canadian Roman Catholic prelate, auxiliary bishop of Quebec (1994–2004) and bishop of Amos (2004–2011).
- Mike Wagner, 76, American football player (Pittsburgh Steelers), four-time Super Bowl champion, pancreatic cancer.
- Reinhold Wosab, 87, German footballer (Borussia Dortmund, VfL Bochum).
- Abdesselam Zenined, 92, Moroccan politician and diplomat, ambassador to Russia (1992–1995).

=== 19 ===
- Don Baird, 74, Australian Olympic pole vaulter (1976).
- Joanne Bland, 72, American civil rights activist, co-founder of the National Voting Rights Museum.
- William M. Bugg, 95, American physicist.
- Derrick Clark, 54, American football player (Denver Broncos).
- Eric Dane, 53, American actor (Grey's Anatomy, The Last Ship, Euphoria), respiratory failure and complications from amyotrophic lateral sclerosis.
- Michel Imbert, 90, French neuropsychologist.
- Jaranthada Karnasuta, 76, Thai politician, member of the Privy Council (since 2016).
- Abderrazak Kéfi, 87, Tunisian politician, minister of transport (1987–1988).
- Barry Knight, 71, American politician, member of the Virginia House of Delegates (since 2009).
- Arturo León Lerma, 88, Mexican baseball Hall of Fame executive (Naranjeros de Hermosillo) and politician, deputy (2000–2003).
- Abdul Hamid Mohamad, 83, Malaysian jurist, president of the Court of Appeal (2007) and chief justice (2007–2008).
- Barry Mpigi, 64, Nigerian politician, member of the House of Representatives (2011–2019) and Senate (since 2019).
- Polycarp Pengo, 81, Tanzanian Roman Catholic cardinal, coadjutor archbishop (1990–1992) and archbishop (1992–2019) of Dar-es-Salaam.
- Kamal Rana, 98, Nepalese politician, member of the Maha Sabha (1959–1960).
- Reliable Man, 17, British Thoroughbred racehorse, euthanised.
- Brian Skinner, 86–87, English Anglican bishop.
- Bobbie Sparrow, 90, Canadian politician, MP (1984–1993), minister of energy, mines, and resources (1993) and forestry (1993).
- Ricky A. J. Syngkon, 54, Indian politician, MP (since 2024).
- Isaiah Zagar, 86, American mosaic artist, complications from heart failure and Parkinson's disease.

=== 20 ===
- Alexander Avdonin, 93, Russian geologist.
- Abdelwahab Bekli, 85, Algerian politician.
- Roger Bofferding, 92, Luxembourgish Olympic sprinter (1960).
- Frank Booker, 61, American basketball player (Bowling Green Falcons, Valur, Grindavík).
- Ted Booth, 87, British poet.
- Philip Castle, 83, British artist, pneumonia.
- Rodolfo Díaz, 82, Argentine politician, minister of labour and social security (1992).
- Layton Freborg, 92, American politician, member of the North Dakota House of Representatives (1973–1976, 1979–1982) and Senate (1985–2012), complications from Alzheimer's disease.
- José Agustín Ganuza García, 94, Spanish Roman Catholic prelate, bishop of Territorial Prelature of Bocas del Toro (1970–2008).
- Joseph L. Green, 95, American science fiction author (Gold the Man).
- Johnny Johns, 74, American figure skater and coach, complications from knee surgery.
- David Judge, 75, British political scientist and writer, oesophageal cancer.
- Ismael Kanater, 69, Moroccan actor (Queen of the Desert, The Forgiven, Alias).
- Nikolai Komyagin, 39, Russian singer (Shortparis).
- Eustace Lake, Antigua and Barbuda politician, MP (2009–2018).
- Bruno Landi, 86, Italian politician, president of Lazio (1983–1984, 1987–1990), deputy (1992–1994).
- Lee Hye-gyeong, 65, South Korean writer.
- Lee Yi-ting, 71, Taiwanese politician, MP (2008), heart disease.
- Vladimír Liščák, 72, Czech sinologist (Czech Academy of Sciences), fall.
- Angela Luce, 87, Italian actress (The Stranger, The Specialists, The Decameron) and singer, heart failure.
- William Q. MacLean Jr., 91, American politician, member of the Massachusetts House of Representatives (1961–1981) and Senate (1981–1993).
- František Mašlaň, 93, Czech Olympic ice hockey player (1960).
- Bill Mazeroski, 89, American Hall of Fame baseball player (Pittsburgh Pirates), World Series champion (1960, 1971).
- Giorgio Mendella, 73, Italian telecommunications executive and fraudster, founder of Retemia, complications from surgery.
- František Mezihorák, 88, Czech pedagogue and politician, senator (1998–2004).
- Rod Monroe, 83, American politician, member of the Oregon House of Representatives (1977–1981) and Senate (1981–1989, 2007–2019).
- Sékou Ouédraogo, 88–89, Burkinabé cinematographer.
- Maurie Raper, 81, Australian rugby league player (Penrith Panthers, Cronulla-Sutherland Sharks).
- Hans-Georg Reimann, 84, German race walker, Olympic silver (1976) and bronze medalist (1972).
- Sankar, 92, Indian novelist (Chowringhee).
- Peter Stämpfli, 88, Swiss painter and sculptor.
- Aron Stewart, 75, American basketball player (Richmond Spiders).
- Vungzagin Valte, 61, Indian politician, Manipur MLA (since 2012), injuries sustained from an attack.
- Tom Vickers, 89, American politician, member of the Nebraska Legislature (1979–1987).

=== 21 ===
- Liliana Angulo Cortés, 51, Colombian visual artist and academic, director of the National Museum of Colombia (since 2024).
- John Bertalot, 94, English organist.
- MaryAnn Bin-Sallik, 85, Australian Indigenous Djaru elder and academic.
- Konstantin Bogdanov, 62, Russian anthropologist and philologist.
- Raymond Bouchard, 80, Canadian actor (Seducing Doctor Lewis).
- Kara Braxton, 43, American basketball player (Detroit Shock, New York Liberty), traffic collision.
- Martyn Butler, 71, English HIV/AIDS activist, co-founder of Terrence Higgins Trust.
- Willie Colón, 75, American salsa musician ("Pedro Navaja") and actor (Vigilante, The Last Fight), respiratory failure.
- Aleksander Czuż, 89, Polish politician, mayor of Białystok (1972–1981), MP (2001–2005).
- Pete Dello, 83, English singer (Honeybus) and songwriter.
- Kevin James Dobson, 73, English-born Australian television director (Five Mile Creek).
- Frank Duffy, 85, British architect.
- Richard Felciano, 95, American composer.
- Guyle Fielder, 95, American-born Canadian ice hockey player (Chicago Black Hawks, Detroit Red Wings, Seattle Totems), stroke.
- Bill Glen, 93, Scottish rugby union player (national team). (death announced on this date)
- Cliff Guffey, 76, American labor union leader, president of the APWU (2010–2013).
- David Harding, 88, Scottish artist.
- Daryl Jackson, 89, Australian architect.
- Vladislav Jovanović, 92, Serbian diplomat and politician, minister of foreign affairs (1992, 1993–1995).
- Mark Kennedy, 74, Australian drummer (Spectrum, Ayers Rock, Marcia Hines) and record producer.
- Mirosław Krawczyk, 72, Polish actor (Disco Polo).
- Arthur Lampkin, 87, English motorcycle racer.
- Melody McCray-Miller, 69, American politician, member of the Kansas House of Representatives (2005–2013).
- Rondale Moore, 25, American football player (Purdue Boilermakers, Arizona Cardinals), suicide by gunshot.
- Walter Pawelkiewicz, 77, German-born American politician, cancer.
- Alessandro Pesenti-Rossi, 83, Italian racing driver (Formula One).
- Karen Shaw Petrou, 72, American financial analyst.
- Miervaldis Polis, 77, Latvian painter and performance artist.
- Koos Postema, 93, Dutch radio and television presenter.
- Vicente L. Rafael, 70, Filipino historian.
- Adam Sandurski, 73, Polish freestyle wrestler, Olympic bronze medalist (1980).
- Dean Schrempp, 90, American politician, member of the South Dakota House of Representatives (1993–1995, 1997–1999, 2009–2017).
- Maxi Shield, 51, Australian drag queen (RuPaul's Drag Race Down Under), throat cancer.
- Dan Simmons, 77, American science fiction and horror writer (Hyperion, The Fall of Hyperion, Song of Kali), complications from a stroke.
- Phil Sobocinski, 80, American football player (Atlanta Falcons).
- Hans-Dieter Sues, 70, German-born American paleontologist.
- Herman Suykerbuyk, 92, Belgian politician, MP (1968–1987), senator (1987–1995).
- Lucinda Vásquez, 67, Peruvian teacher and politician, member of the Congress (since 2021).
- James Willey, 86, American composer.
- Wiesław Zajączkowski, 82, Polish politician, MP (1989–1991).

=== 22 ===
- Birgitta Andersson, 92, Swedish actress (Jönssonligan, Docking the Boat, The Apple War), complications from influenza.
- Iris Cantor, 95, American philanthropist.
- Yaroslav Cherstvy, 92, Russian Olympic rower (1956).
- Doctor R. Crants, 81, American businessman, co-founder of CoreCivic.
- El Mencho, 59, Mexican drug lord, leader of the Jalisco New Generation Cartel (since 2010), shot.
- Maureen Hemphill, 89, Canadian politician, Manitoba MLA (1981–1990).
- Joan Huber, 100, American sociologist.
- Reiko Katsura, 89, Japanese voice actress (Ikkyū-san, Space Emperor God Sigma, Wolf Boy Ken), respiratory failure.
- Serge Lajeunesse, 75, Canadian ice hockey player (Detroit Red Wings, Philadelphia Flyers).
- Willy Loretan, 91, Swiss politician, mayor of Zofingen (1974–1992).
- Luci4, 23, American rapper.
- Nasser Mohammadifar, 80, Iranian brigadier general, commander of the Army Ground Forces (2001–2005).
- Ardis E. Parshall, 66, American historian.
- Jim Parsons, 82, English rugby union player (Oxford, Northampton, national team).
- Fernand Roberge, 85, Canadian politician, senator (1993–2000).
- Eugene G. Sander, 90, American academic.
- Amnat Sonimsat, 92, Thai politician, senator (1992–2000).
- Herb Trawick, 69, Canadian-born American music executive.
- Ali Tutal, 75, Turkish actor (On Fertile Lands, Hemşo, Home Coming), brain haemorrhage.
- Ronyell Whitaker, 46, American football player (Tampa Bay Buccaneers, Minnesota Vikings), brain aneurysm.

=== 23 ===
- Jonas Allooloo, 79, Canadian Inuk Anglican priest and Bible translator.
- Ali Babachahi, 83, Iranian poet and writer.
- Coleman Barks, 88, American poet and writer.
- Glaudi Barsotti, 92, French writer and journalist.
- Nikolay Blagodatov, 88, Russian nonconformist art collector.
- Robert Carradine, 71, American actor (Revenge of the Nerds, Coming Home, Lizzie McGuire), suicide by hanging.
- David Chadwick, 81, American Zen Buddhist priest and writer.
- Birte Christoffersen, 101, Danish-Swedish diver, Olympic bronze medalist (1948).
- Charles Dean, 86, American politician, member of the Florida House of Representatives (2002–2007) and Senate (2007–2016).
- Gary Dontzig, 79, American television producer (Murphy Brown, Suddenly Susan, Becker), Emmy winner (1991).
- Bobby Douglas, 83, American Olympic wrestler (1964, 1968).
- Gerald Hay, 79, Australian Olympic weightlifter (1964).
- Ulysses Jenkins, 79, American visual artist.
- Ora Kedem, 101, Austrian-born Israeli chemist.
- Stephanie Kugelman, 78, American advertising executive.
- Sondra Lee, 97, American actress (Hello, Dolly!, Peter Pan, Sunday in New York) and singer.
- Richard Mauer, 76, American investigative journalist.
- Andrej Medved, 79, Slovene poet, editor and translator.
- Gregorio Morán, 79, Spanish journalist and writer.
- Kazumasa Nagai, 96, Japanese printmaker and graphic designer, acute respiratory failure.
- Rab Nawaz, 85, Pakistani cricket umpire (ODI) and organiser. (death announced on this date)
- Éliane Radigue, 94, French composer.
- Monti Rock III, 86, American singer (Disco-Tex and the Sex-O-Lettes) and actor (Saturday Night Fever), complications from chronic obstructive pulmonary disease.
- Rupert Roopnaraine, 83, Guyanese cricketer (Cambridge University) and politician, minister of education (2015–2017).
- Mukul Roy, 71, Indian politician, MP (2006–2017), minister of railways (2012), and West Bengal MLA (since 2021), heart attack.
- Têtêvi Godwin Tété-Adjalogo, 98, Togolese historian and politician.

=== 24 ===
- Nicolae Andronati, 90, Moldovan politician, deputy (1990–1994).
- Uncle Joe Benson, 76, American rock radio DJ (KLOS), complications from Parkinson's disease dementia and a fall.
- Petter Bjørheim, 61, Norwegian politician, MP (1989–1993).
- Ruben Castillo, 68, American boxer, cancer.
- Lauren Chapin, 80, American actress (Father Knows Best), cancer.
- Daryl Cumming, 74, Australian footballer (Richmond).
- Jim Donnelly, 79, Scottish snooker player.
- Nina Gabrielyan, 72, Russian poet, writer and artist.
- Ann Godoff, 76, American editor and publisher, bone cancer.
- Arthur Gooch, 94, Australian footballer (Collingwood).
- Oliver "Power" Grant, 52, American clothing manufacturer and music producer (Wu-Tang Clan), pancreatic cancer.
- Gianluigi Jessi, 80, Italian Olympic basketball player (1968).
- Rex Lee Jim, 63, American Navajo politician, member of the Navajo Nation Council (2003–2011).
- Virginia Judge, 69, Australian politician.
- Stephen Koch, 84, American writer.
- Jeremy Larner, 88, American author and screenwriter (The Candidate, Drive, He Said), Oscar winner (1973).
- Willy Ngoma, 52, Congolese military spokesman (March 23 Movement), drone strike.
- Maria O'Brien, 75, American actress (Smile, Table for Five, Protocol) and acting coach.
- Lorin N. Pace, 100, American politician, member of the Utah House of Representatives (1964–1986) and Senate (1986–1991).
- Giancarlo Politi, 89, Italian art critic, founder of Flash Art.
- Moustafa Reyadh, 84, Egyptian footballer (Tersana, Al-Salmiya, national team).
- Carl Samuelson, 94, American swim coach (Williams College).
- Bill Saunderson, 92, Canadian politician, Ontario MPP (1995–1999).
- Irina Shevchuk, 74, Russian actress (The Dawns Here Are Quiet, White Bim Black Ear), brain tumor.
- Francesco Sibello, 80, Italian Olympic sailor (1972).

=== 25 ===
- Dick Absher, 81, American football player (New Orleans Saints, Atlanta Falcons, Philadelphia Eagles), pneumonia.
- Takeshi Amemiya, 90, Japanese economist, aspiration pneumonia.
- Abdul Majid Arfaei, 86, Iranian Elamitologist.
- Bobby J. Brown, 62, American actor (The Wire, We Own This City, The Corner), smoke inhalation.
- Conchita Bustindui, 98, Spanish pelotari.
- William E. Connolly, 88, American political theorist.
- Charlie Smith Dannelly, 101, American politician, member of the North Carolina Senate (1994–2013).
- Mansour Diagne, 93, Senegalese Olympic basketball player (1968).
- Boško Đorđević, 72, Serbian footballer (Partizan, Rad, SG Union Solingen).
- Lidia Erokhina, 70, Russian economist.
- Nelson Rodrigues Filho, 80, Brazilian cultural activist.
- Bruce Froemming, 86, American baseball umpire, fall.
- Jeff Galloway, 80, American Olympic runner (1972), stroke.
- Claudio González, 49, Argentine footballer (Club Atlético Patronato, Independiente, Talleres de Córdoba).
- Wayne Granger, 81, American baseball player (Cincinnati Reds).
- Rob Grant, 70, English comedy writer and television producer (Red Dwarf).
- Natalya Klimova, 87, Russian actress (Comrade Arseny, The Hyperboloid of Engineer Garin, The Snow Queen).
- Roman Kofman, 89, Ukrainian conductor (Kyiv Chamber Orchestra) and composer.
- Giorgio Mammoliti, 64, Canadian politician, Ontario MPP (1990–1995) and member of the Toronto City Council (1998–2018).
- Scotty Morrison, 95, Canadian Hall of Fame ice hockey referee and administrator, president (1986–1991) and chairman (1991–1999) of the Hockey Hall of Fame.
- R. Nallakannu, 101, Indian politician, multiple organ failure.
- Alex Noerdin, 75, Indonesian politician, governor of South Sumatra (2008–2018).
- Fahmy Omar, 97, Egyptian radio broadcaster.
- Ioanna Papantoniou, 90, Greek author, designer and folklorist.
- Burnie Payne, 86, Australian footballer (Hobart).
- Norma Presmeg, 83, South African-born American mathematics educator and researcher.
- Phil Ryan, 80, American Texas Ranger, heart disease.
- Horst Schnoor, 91, German footballer (Hamburger SV).
- Ludwig Scotty, 77, Nauruan politician, president (2003, 2004–2007) and five-time speaker of the Parliament.
- Antonio Tejero, 93, Spanish lieutenant colonel (Operation Galaxia), main leader of the 1981 Spanish coup attempt.
- David H. Waldeck, 69, American chemist.
- Carol Walker, 90, American mathematician.
- Zhani Ziçishti, 85, Albanian actor.
- Princess Donata of Prussia, 73, Prussian princess and equestrian journalist.

=== 26 ===
- Giuseppe Albertini, 73, Italian politician, deputy (1992–2006).
- Bjarte Baasland, 51, Norwegian fraudster.
- Piero Barucci, 92, Italian politician, minister of treasury (1992–1994).
- Drusilla Beyfus, 98, English writer and journalist (Reading Mercury).
- Giampiero Branduardi, 89, Italian Olympic ice hockey player (1956, 1964).
- Carl H. Brans, 90, American mathematical physicist.
- Gordon Corrigan, 83, British army officer and writer.
- Ferdinand Croy, 85, Austrian Olympic equestrian (1972).
- Utsav Charan Das, 80, Indian dancer.
- Karl Dempwolf, 86, Dutch-American painter.
- Candan Dumanlı, 87, Turkish football player (Ankaragücü, national team) and manager (Malatyaspor).
- Margaret Farquhar, 95, Scottish politician, lord provost of Aberdeen (1996–1999).
- Richard Farrimond, 78, British engineer and astronaut.
- Hans-Georg Fritz, 93, German politician, member of the Landtag of Hesse (1973–1974).
- Lynda Hale, 72, English footballer (Southampton, national team), idiopathic pulmonary fibrosis.
- Sir Ronald Hampel, 93, British industrialist.
- Robin Jefferson, 84, New Zealand cricketer (Southland, Otago, Wellington).
- Craig Johnson, 72, American politician, member of the Alaska House of Representatives (2007–2017, 2023–2025).
- Kyoji Komachi, 80, Japanese diplomat, ambassador to Thailand (2008–2010).
- Devonta Lee, 27, American football player (LSU Tigers, Louisiana Tech Bulldogs), bone cancer.
- Louise London, 78, British writer (Whitehall and the Jews, 1933–1948), cancer.
- Gregorio Luque, 83, Mexican baseball player and manager.
- Tyrone G. Martin, 95, American navy commander and naval historian.
- Gerhard A. Meinl, 68, German businessman and politician.
- Bill Minkin, 84, American actor (The King of Comedy, Taxi Driver, Jak and Daxter) and singer.
- Bevan Morris, 76, Australian-born American academic and politician.
- Ahmed Nimal, 62, Maldivian film director (Shakku, Sitee, Udhaas) and actor, complications from a stroke.
- T. K. Oommen, 88, Indian sociologist, president of the International Sociological Association (1990–1994).
- Maroof Raza, 66, Indian Army officer, cancer.
- Roscoe Robinson, 97, American gospel and soul singer.
- Pepito Rodriguez, 83, Filipino actor (Sa Bilis Walang Kaparis), pneumonia.
- Loredana Simonetti, 95, Italian middle-distance runner.
- Ken Smith, 96, Scottish rugby union player (South of Scotland District, national team, British & Irish Lions), pneumonia.
- André Vanasse, 83, Canadian writer, complications from Alzheimer's disease.
- Vladimir Veber, 84, Moldovan football player (Zimbru Chișinău) and manager.

=== 27 ===
- David Botstein, 83, American biologist.
- John H. Caldwell, 97, American Olympic skier (1952) and author.
- Audrey Emerton, Baroness Emerton, 90, British nursing administrator and life peer, member of the House of Lords (1997–2019).
- Eddie Germano, 101, American cartoonist (The Boston Globe).
- Peter J. Genova, 81, American politician, member of the New Jersey General Assembly (1985–1990).
- Sonny Gibbs, 86, American football player (Dallas Cowboys, Detroit Lions).
- Charlie Grall, 71, French journalist and Breton independence activist.
- Bo Gritz, 87, American lieutenant colonel and politician, inspiration for John Rambo.
- Joaherul Islam, 70, Bangladeshi politician, MP (2019–2024), multiple organ failure.
- Darío Lopérfido, 61, Argentine politician, cultural promoter and journalist, amyotrophic lateral sclerosis.
- John Markie, 81, Scottish footballer (Falkirk, Clyde, Stenhousemuir).
- Colman McCarthy, 87, American journalist (The Washington Post) and peace activist, complications from pneumonia.
- Sandro Munari, 85, Italian rally driver, World Rally champion (1977).
- Adeeb Naser, 86, Palestinian poet.
- Bernat Rosner, 94, Hungarian-born American lawyer and Holocaust survivor.
- Les Rumsey, 70, English speedway rider.
- Neil Sedaka, 86, American singer ("Breaking Up Is Hard to Do", "Laughter in the Rain") and songwriter ("Love Will Keep Us Together"), atherosclerotic cardiovascular disease.
- Andrzej Trautman, 93, Polish mathematical physicist.
- James E. Waggoner Jr., 77, American Episcopalian clergyman, bishop of Spokane (2000–2017).
- Travis Wammack, 81, American rock and roll guitarist.
- Robin Weiss, 86, British molecular biologist, cancer.
- Tatjana Wood, 99, German-born American comic book artist (Camelot 3000, Swamp Thing, Animal Man).

=== 28 ===
- Karlen G. Adamyan, 89, Armenian cardiologist.
- Lorraine Bayly, 89, Australian actress (The Sullivans, Play School, Carson's Law).
- Steven P. Brennan, 59, American set dresser (The Last Samurai, John Wick: Chapter 2, Shutter Island), complications from amyotrophic lateral sclerosis.
- Mario Buhagiar, 81, Maltese art historian.
- Dennis Carvalho, 78, Brazilian television director (Roda de Fogo, Anos Rebeldes) and actor (O Meu Pé de Laranja Lima).
- Roberto Castrillo, 84, Cuban sport shooter, Olympic bronze medalist (1980).
- Paul Conroy, 61, British photojournalist, heart attack.
- Ray Glastonbury, 87, Welsh rugby union (Cardiff) and league (Workington Town, national team) player.
- John P. Hammond, 83, American blues singer and guitarist.
- Dave Hood, 75, American television host, complications from coronary artery bypass surgery.
- Herb Hutson, 76, American baseball player (Chicago Cubs).
- Sir David Kirch, 89, English art collector and philanthropist.
- Larry Kump, 78, American politician, member of the West Virginia House of Delegates (2010–2014, 2018–2020, since 2022).
- Claude Lacaze, 85, French rugby union player (Lourdes, Racing Club de Nice, national team).
- Lars Lallerstedt, 87, Swedish industrial designer.
- Bernard Lewis, 100, English clothing chain executive, founder and president of River Island.
- Nabilah Lubis, 83, Indonesian philologist and writer.
- Boncana Maïga, 77, Malian composer and musician.
- Makybe Diva, 26, Australian Thoroughbred racehorse, three-time Melbourne Cup winner (2003–2005), colic.
- Don McCune, 89, American ten-pin bowler.
- Makan Nasiri, 7, Iranian elementary school student, airstrike.
- Johana Ng'eno, 53, Kenyan politician, MP (since 2013), helicopter crash.
- Monica Pickersgill, 91-92, British field hockey administrator.
- Charles S. Russell, 100, American lawyer and judge.
- Jack Scarisbrick, 97, British historian and anti-abortion activist, co-founder of Life.
- Rémy Scheurer, 91, Swiss politician, MP (1991–2003).
- Annabel Schofield, 62, Welsh-born American model and actress (Dallas, Solar Crisis, Blood Tide), brain cancer.
- Denis Wilson, 89, English footballer (Stoke City).
- Marie Woo, 97, Chinese-American ceramicist and educator. (death announced on this date)
- Notable Iranian government officials and military personnel killed in the Iran war:
  - Hossein Jabal Amelian, chairman of the Organization of Defensive Innovation and Research (SPND)
  - Saleh Asadi, military intelligence officer
  - Mohammad Baseri, 53, intelligence officer
  - Mohsen Darrebaghi, brigadier general and fighter pilot in the IRGC Air Force
  - Ali Khamenei, 86, ayatollah, chairman of the EDC (1988–1989), supreme leader (since 1989) and president (1981–1989)
  - Bahram Hosseini Motlagh, military officer in the IRGC
  - Abdolrahim Mousavi, 65–66, chief of staff of the armed forces (since 2025) and commander-in-chief of the Army (2017–2025)
  - Reza Mozaffari Nia, 66–67, military official, chairman of the SPND
  - Aziz Nasirzadeh, 62, minister of defence (since 2024)
  - Mohammad Pakpour, 64, commander of the IRGC (since 2025)
  - Gholamreza Rezaian, commander of the Islamic Republic of Iran Police Intelligence Organization
  - Ali Shamkhani, 70, naval officer and politician, minister of defence (1997–2005), secretary of the SNSC (2013–2023), and member of the EDC (since 2023)
  - Mohammad Shirazi, military officer
