= Naruse =

Naruse (written: 成瀬 or 鳴瀬) is a Japanese surname. Notable people with the surname include:

- Eimi Naruse (成瀬 瑛美), Japanese idol and voice actress
- Hiromu Naruse (成瀬 弘; 1944–2010), Japanese test driver and engineer
- Masayuki Naruse (成瀬 昌由; born 1973), Japanese professional wrestler
- Mia Naruse (成瀬 未亜; born 1978), Japanese voice actress
- Mikio Naruse (成瀬 巳喜男; 1905–1969), Japanese film director, screenwriter and producer
- Morishige Naruse (成瀬守重; 1933–2026), Japanese politician
- Nobu Naruse (成瀬 野生; born 1984), Japanese cross-country skier
- Shuhei Naruse (鳴瀬 シュウヘイ), Japanese musician and composer
- Shumpei Naruse (成瀬 竣平; born 2001), Japanese footballer
- Yoshihisa Naruse (成瀬 善久; born 1985), Japanese baseball player
- Robert Naruse (born 1956), American physician and professor of anesthesiology

== See also ==
- Naruse Station, a railway station in Machida, Tokyo, Japan
