= Rodolfo Díaz =

Rodolfo Díaz can refer to:

- Rodolfo Díaz (basketball) (1918–1993), Mexican Olympic basketball player
- Rodolfo Díaz (Argentine boxer) (1936–2003), Argentine Olympic boxer
- Rodolfo Díaz (politician) (1943–2026), Argentine Justicialist politician
- Rodolfo Díaz (Philippine boxer) (born 1946), Filipino Olympic boxer
