= René Kaës =

French psychologist and psychoanalyst (1936–2026)

- Born: 19 February 1936; Fameck, France
- Died: 1 February 2026 (aged 89)
- Education: Marc Bloch University; Paris Nanterre University (DND)
- Occupations: Psychologist; Psychoanalyst

René Kaës (French: [ʁəne kaɛ]; 19 February 1936 – 1 February 2026) was a French psychologist and psychoanalyst.

== Life and career ==
Kaës studied psychosociology at Marc Bloch University and wrote a thesis titled Images de la culture chez les ouvriers français in 1966 and earned a doctorate in 1974 with a thesis titled Processus groupal et représentations sociales: Études psychanalytiques sur les groupes de formation under the supervision of Didier Anzieu. As a psychoanalyst, he was a member of the Quatrième Groupe and served on the reading committee of the academic journal Cliniques méditerranéennes.

Kaës died on 1 February 2026, at the age of 89.

== Publications ==
- Images de la Culture chez les ouvriers français (1968)
- L'appareil psychique groupal (1976)
- Crise, rupture et dépassement (1979)
- Le groupe et le sujet du groupe (1993)
- La parole et le lien. Associativité et travail psychique dans les groupes (1994)
- Souffrance et psychopathologie des liens institutionnels (1996)
- Les théories psychanalytiques du groupe (1999)
- Les voies de la psyché. Hommage à Didier Anzieu (2000)
- L'institution et les institutions: Études psychanalytiques (2003)
- Un singulier pluriel. La psychanalyse à l'épreuve du groupe (2007)
- Fantasme et formation (2007)
- Le complexe fraternel (2008)
- L’Institution en héritage. Mythes de fondation, transmissions, transformations (2008)
- Les alliances inconscientes (2009)
- Le malêtre (2012)
- Le meurtriel, l'incestuel et le traumatique (2015)
