= Jacques Gaillard (writer) =

French writer (1948–2026)

- Born: 1948
- Died: 12 February 2026 (aged 77–78)
- Education: École normale supérieure de Fontenay-Saint-Cloud
- Occupations: Writer; Latinist

Jacques Gaillard (French: [ʒˈak ɡajˈaʁ]; 1948 – 12 February 2026) was a French writer and Latinist.

A graduate of the École normale supérieure de Fontenay-Saint-Cloud, he was a senior lecturer at Marc Bloch University.

Gaillard died on 12 February 2026.

== Publications ==
=== On Ancient Rome ===
- Beau comme l'Antique (1993)
- De Viris... (1995)
- Rome, le Temps, les Choses (1995)
- Approche de la littérature latine (2005)
- Anthologie de la littérature latine (2006)

=== Fictional works ===
- Des Psychologues sont sur place... (2003)
- Mes aventures en Haute-Savoie (2004)
- Pourtant j'ai eu un ours en peluche (2004)
- Amours tordues (2005)
- Jean-Baptiste Botul: La Métaphysique du Mou (2007)
- Trop (2007)
- Qu'il était beau, mon Meccano! (2009)
- Du trou au tout. Correspondance à moi-même, tome 1 (2012)
