= Kyoji Komachi =

Japanese diplomat (1946–2026)

Kyoji Komachi (小町 恭士, Komachi Kyōji; February 25, 1946 – February 26, 2026) was a Japanese diplomat who served as Ambassador to Thailand.

== Life and career ==
Komachi was born on February 25, 1946. He studied law at the Kyoto University.

He entered the Japanese Ministry of Foreign Affairs in 1969. From 1981 to 1984, he served as First Secretary of the Japanese Embassy in the United States. From 1984 to 1987, he served as Councillor of the Japanese Embassy in the Soviet Union. From 1994 to 1996, he served as the Japanese Consul-General in London. From 2004 to 2007, he served as the Japanese Ambassador to the Netherlands. In 2008, he became the Japanese Ambassador to Thailand.

Komachi died on February 26, 2026, one day after his 80th birthday.
