= Salvatore Mazzaracchio =

Italian politician (1934–2026)

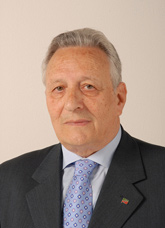
- Mazzaracchio in 2006

Member of the Senate of the Republic of Italy for Apulia
- In office 29 April 2008 – 14 March 2013

Member of the Chamber of Deputies of Italy for XXI Puglia
- In office 28 April 2006 – 28 April 2008

Personal details
- Born: 3 January 1934 San Paolo Albanese, Italy
- Died: 6 February 2026 (aged 92) Rome, Italy
- Party: PdL
- Occupation: Journalist

Salvatore Mazzaracchio (3 January 1934 – 6 February 2026) was an Italian politician. A member of The People of Freedom, he served in the Chamber of Deputies from 2006 to 2008 and was a Senator from 2008 to 2013.

Mazzaracchio died in Rome on 6 February 2026, at the age of 92.
