= David H. Waldeck =

American chemist (1956–2026)

- Born: David Hennessey Waldeck; September 5, 1956; Cincinnati, Ohio, U.S.
- Died: February 25, 2026 (aged 69); Pittsburgh, Pennsylvania, U.S.
- Education: University of Cincinnati; University of Chicago
- Occupation: Chemist
- Children: 2

David Hennessey Waldeck (September 5, 1956 – February 25, 2026) was an American chemist.

== Life and career ==
Waldeck was born in Cincinnati, Ohio. He attended the University of Cincinnati, earning his BS degree in 1978. He also attended the University of Chicago, earning his PhD degree in chemistry in 1983. After earning his degrees, he worked as a postdoctoral fellow at the University of California, Berkeley.

Waldeck served as a professor in the department of chemistry at the University of Pittsburgh from 1985 to 2024. During his years as a professor, in 2004, he was named a fellow of the American Physical Society, "for his fundamental contributions to the molecular and electronic origins of friction in chemical reactions and transport processes in liquid solutions", and was named a distinguished professor in 2024. In the same year, he co-authored the textbook Principles of Physical Chemistry, which emphasizes a molecular-level understanding of chemical systems.

== Death ==
Waldeck died in Pittsburgh, Pennsylvania on February 25, 2026, at the age of 69.
