= Têtêvi Godwin Tété-Adjalogo =

Togolese historian and politician (1928–2026)

Member of the Sovereign National Conference
- In office 8 July 1991 – 28 August 1991

Personal details
- Born: 16 January 1928 Ahouangor, French Dahomey, French West Africa
- Died: 23 February 2026 (aged 98)
- Party: CDPA
- Education: ESTP; University of Paris
- Occupation: Historian

Têtêvi Godwin Tété-Adjalogo (16 January 1928 – 23 February 2026) was a Togolese historian and politician of the Democratic Convention of African Peoples (CDPA).

== Life and career ==
Tété-Adjalogo attended the École Spéciale des Travaux Publics and the University of Paris before working for the World Bank in Washington, D.C. for 20 years. He was a founding member of the CDPA and notably served on the Sovereign National Conference amidst the 1990–1991 Togo protests. He also published numerous works on the political history of Togo, German and French colonization, figures of independence, pan-Africanism, and contemporary democratic struggles. His writings focused particularly on Marcus Garvey and Sylvanus Olympio.

Tété-Adjalogo died on 23 February 2026, at the age of 98.

== Publications ==
- Marcus Garvey : Père de l’unité africaine des peuples
- La Question nègre
- De la colonisation allemande au Deutsche-Togo Bund
- Omer Adoté, un martyr politique du Togo
- Des principes fondamentaux du militantisme
- Peuples africains, prenons en main notre destin !
- Ma chétive vie – Parcours d’un militant politique panafricaniste
- Histoire du Togo
- La palpitante quête de l’Ablodé (1940–1960)
- Le régime et l’assassinat de Sylvanus Olympio (1960–1963)
- La longue nuit de terreur (1963–2003)
- Le cœur du peuple togolais : soupire vers la liberté
