= Clyde Maughan =

American electrical engineer (1926–2026)

Clyde Maughan (July 5, 1926 – February 7, 2026) was an American electrical engineer with GE Power and Maughan Engineering Consultants in Schenectady, New York. He was named a Fellow of the Institute of Electrical and Electronics Engineers (IEEE) in 2016 for his contributions to large generator insulation systems and generator failure mechanisms. Maughan died on February 7, 2026, at the age of 99.
