= Guido A. Zäch =

Swiss politician (1935–2026)

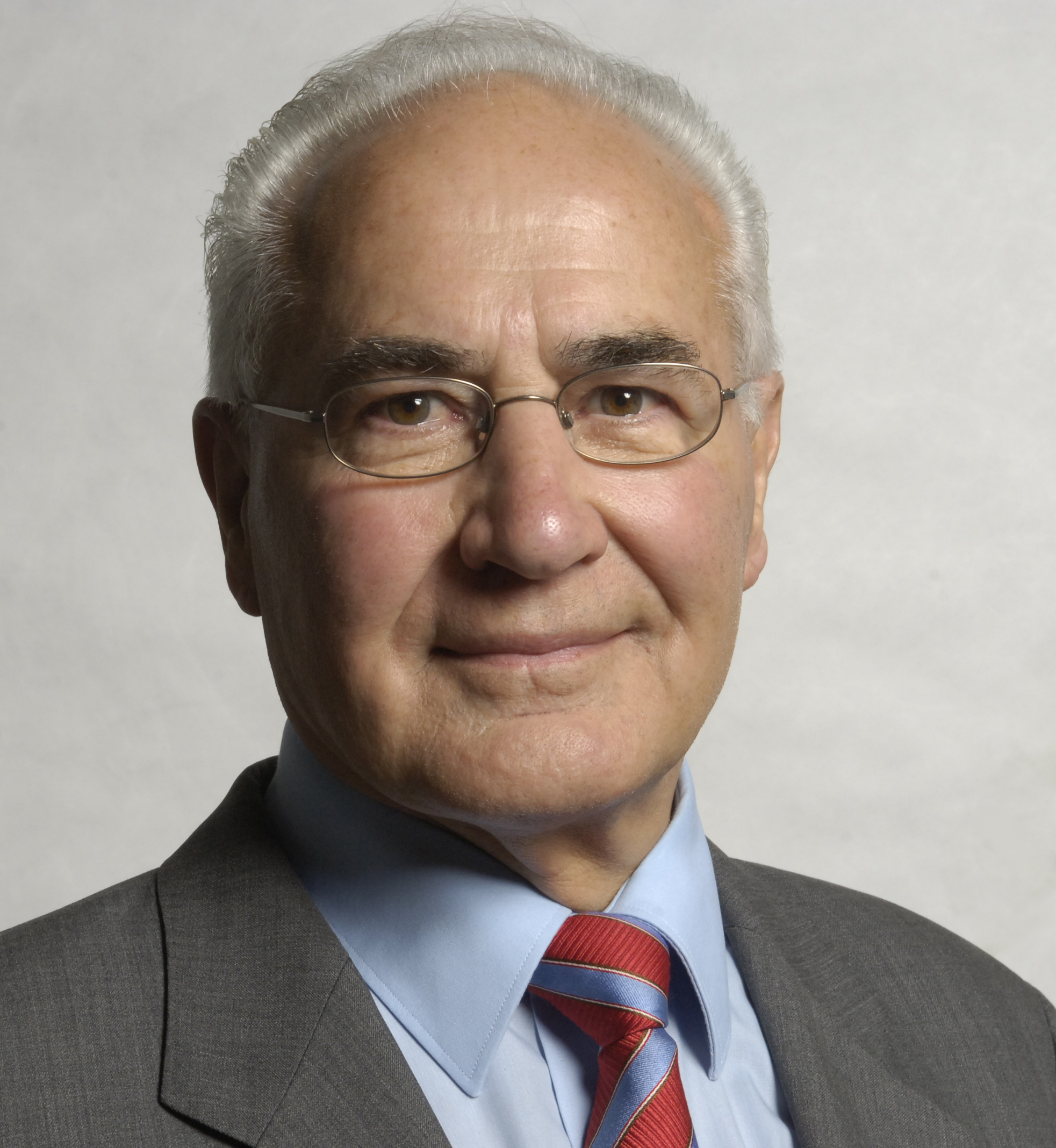
- Zäch in 2007

Member of the Swiss National Council
- In office 6 December 1999 – 11 July 2003

Member of the Grand Council of Basel-Stadt
- In office 1984–1988

Personal details
- Born: Guido Alfons Zäch; 1 October 1935 Häggenschwil, St. Gallen, Switzerland
- Died: 16 February 2026 (aged 90)
- Party: CVP
- Education: University of Fribourg; University of Basel
- Occupation: Doctor

Guido Alfons Zäch (1 October 1935 – 16 February 2026) was a Swiss politician of the Christian Democratic People's Party (CVP).

== Life and career ==
Born in Häggenschwil on 1 October 1935, Zäch studied medicine at the University of Fribourg and the University of Basel. He founded the Schweizer Paraplegiker-Zentrum and served as its director from 1973 to 1989. He was also president of the Swiss Paraplegic Foundation until 2007.

In 1984, he was elected to the Grand Council of Basel-Stadt, where he served until 1988. In 1999, he was elected to the National Council with the CVP. In 2002, he was indicted by the public prosecutor's office in Basel for "breach of trust and multiple instances of mismanagement" after 60 million Swiss francs were lost by the Swiss Paraplegic Foundation and allegedly used for his personal enrichment. In 2003, he was sentenced to two years in prison for embezzlement. However, he appealed the decision and a verdict was reached in 2005, which handed him a 16-month suspended sentence.

Zäch died on 16 February 2026, at the age of 90.
