= Juhan Habicht =

Estonian translator and writer (1954–2026)

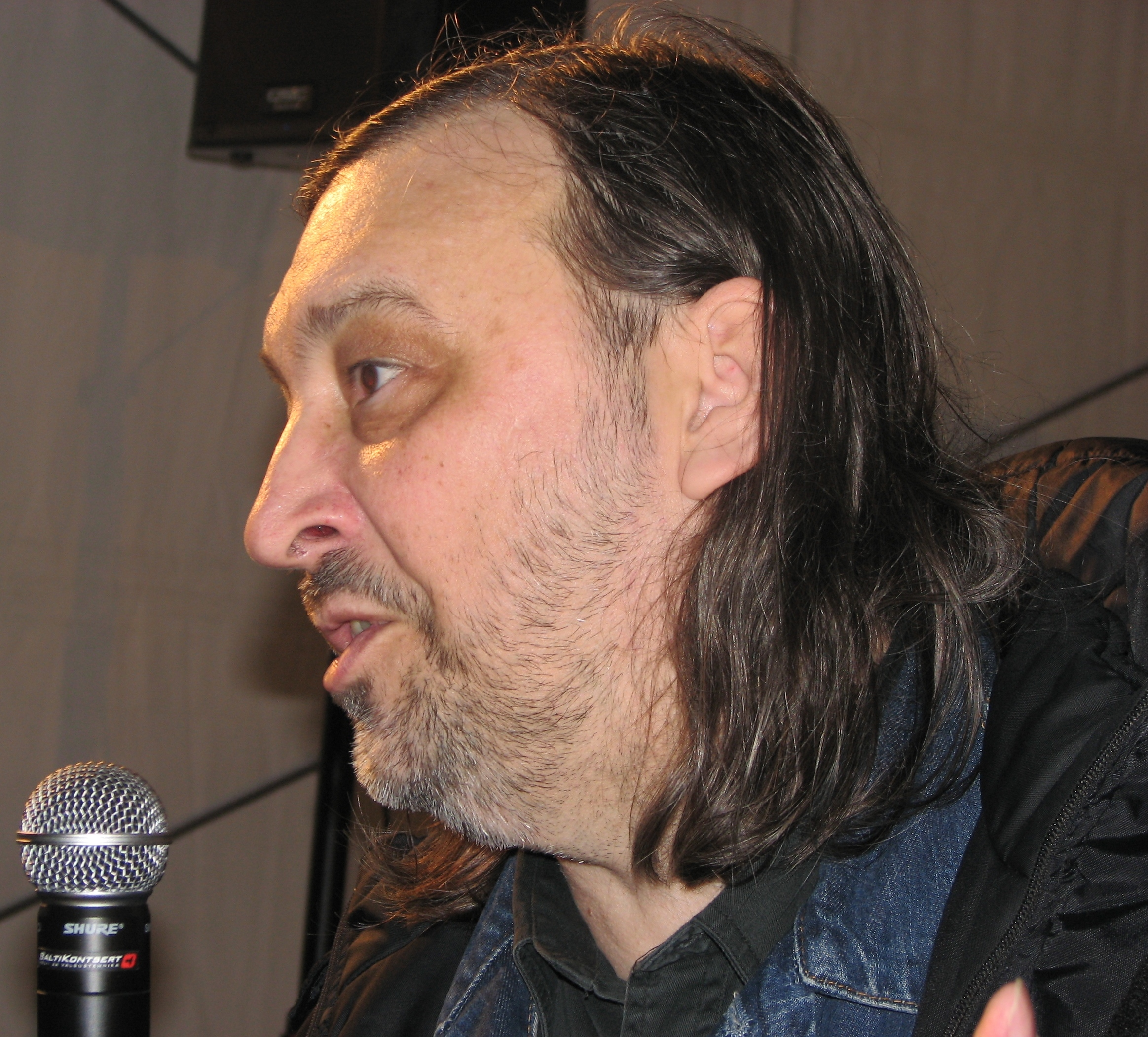
- Habicht in 2010
- Born: 24 January 1954; Nõmme, then part of Estonian SSR, Soviet Union
- Died: 12 February 2026 (aged 72)
- Education: University of Tartu
- Occupations: Translator, writer

Juhan Habicht (24 January 1954 – 12 February 2026) was an Estonian translator and writer. A member of the Estonian Writers' Union, he was best known for his editing work in the Estonian-language electronic science fiction magazine Algernon.

Habicht died on 12 February 2026, at the age of 72.
