= Émilie Manima =

Congolese politician (1936–2026)

Minister of Social Affairs
- In office 9 January 1975 – March 1977

Personal details
- Born: 25 March 1936 Brazzaville, French Congo, French Equatorial Africa
- Died: 11 February 2026 (aged 89) Brazzaville, Republic of the Congo
- Occupation: Midwife

Émilie Manima (25 March 1936 – 11 February 2026) was a Congolese politician.

== Life and career ==
After her studies at the École des sages-femmes in Dakar, she worked as a midwife and became a feminist activist, promoting maternal health. On 9 January 1975, she was nominated to be Minister of Social Affairs by President Marien Ngouabi, the first woman to serve as a government minister in the country.

Manima died in Brazzaville on 11 February 2026, at the age of 89.
