= Erhard Stiefel =

Swiss mask maker (1940–2026)

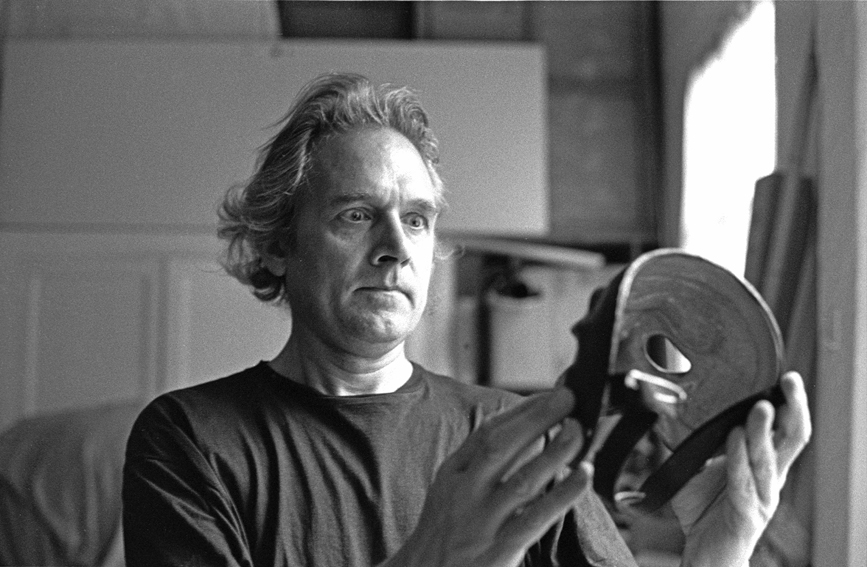
- Stiefel in 1999
- Born: 9 May 1940; Zurich, Switzerland
- Died: 14 February 2026 (aged 85); Paris, France
- Occupation: Mask maker

Erhart Stiefel (9 May 1940 – 14 February 2026) was a Swiss mask maker.

Stiefel was named a master of mask design in 2000, a leading expert on creating masks for theatrical performances. He was known to use a lissoir when sculpting masks.

Stiefel died in Paris on 14 February 2026, at the age of 85.
