= Jenő Murádin =

Romanian art historian (1937–2026)

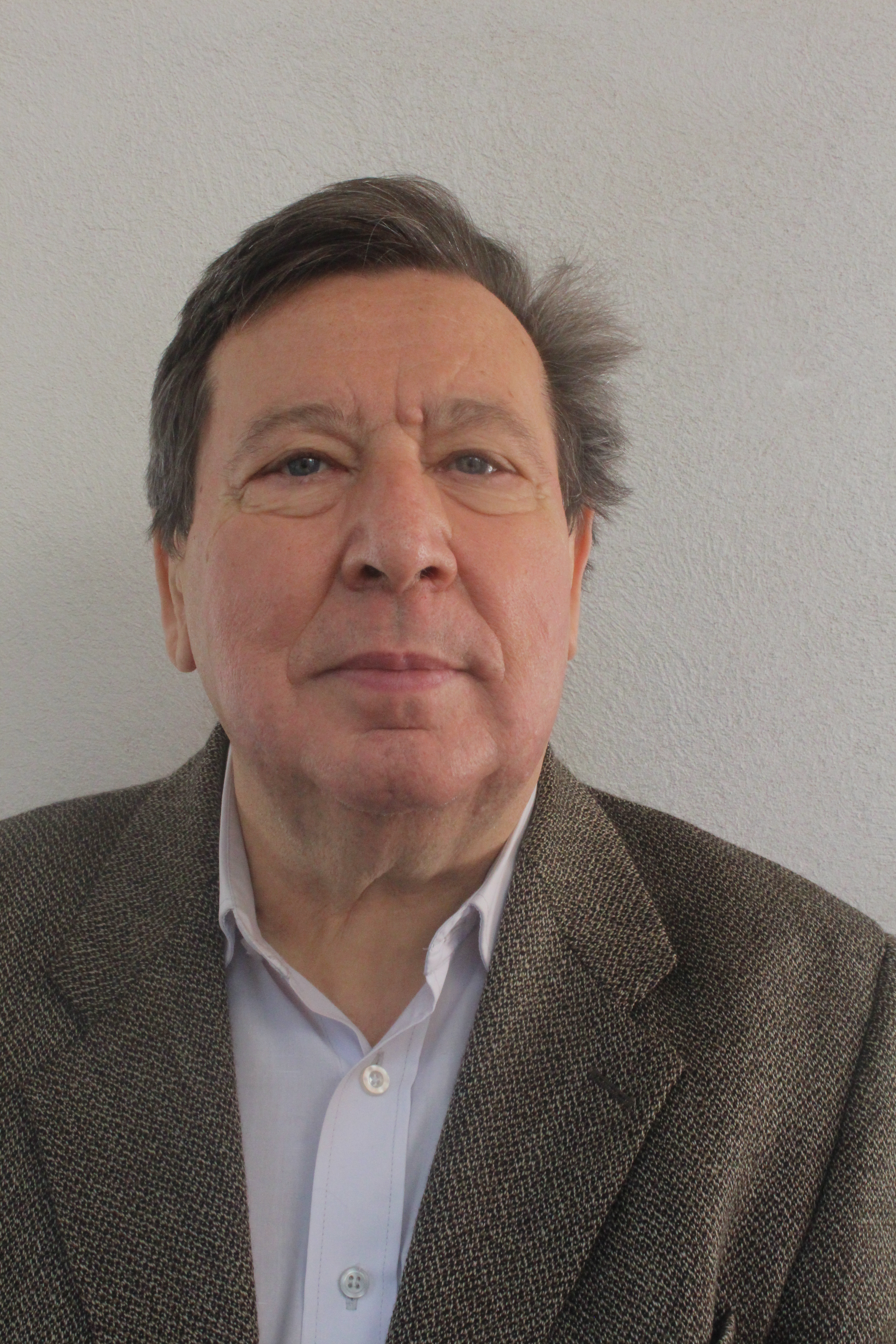
- Murádin in 2016
- Born: 23 November 1937; Călărași, Turda County, Romania
- Died: 11 February 2026 (aged 88); Cluj-Napoca, Romania
- Education: Babeș-Bolyai University
- Occupation: Art historian

Jenő Murádin (23 November 1937 – 11 February 2026) was a Romanian art historian.

An ethnic Hungarian, he was a professor at the Art and Design University of Cluj-Napoca and primarily studied Transylvanian art.

Murádin died in Cluj-Napoca on 11 February 2026, at the age of 88.

== Publications ==
- Klein József (1977)
- Barabás Miklós Céh. (1978)
- Gy. Szabó Béla (1980)
- Ferenczy művészcsalád Erdélybe (1981)
- Nagy István (1984)
- Maticska Jenő (1985)
- A tél festője - Gruzda János (1989)
- Nagy Oszkár. Kishonthy Zsolttal (1993)
- Nagybánya - a festőtelep művészei (1994)
- Dömötör Gizella - Mund Hugó (1996)
- Nagybánya 100 éve. Szücs Györggyel (1996)
- Thorma János. Bay Miklóssal (1997)
- Erdélyi festőiskolák (1997)
- Kovács Zoltán (1998)
- Fadrusz János : két szobor száz éve (2002)
- Gyergyó művészeti topográfiája (2003)
- Szathmáry Pap Károly (2003)
- Az aradi Szabadság-szobor (2003)
- Erdélyi magyar metszetművészet a 20. században (2004)
