= Margot Queitsch =

German politician (1946–2026)

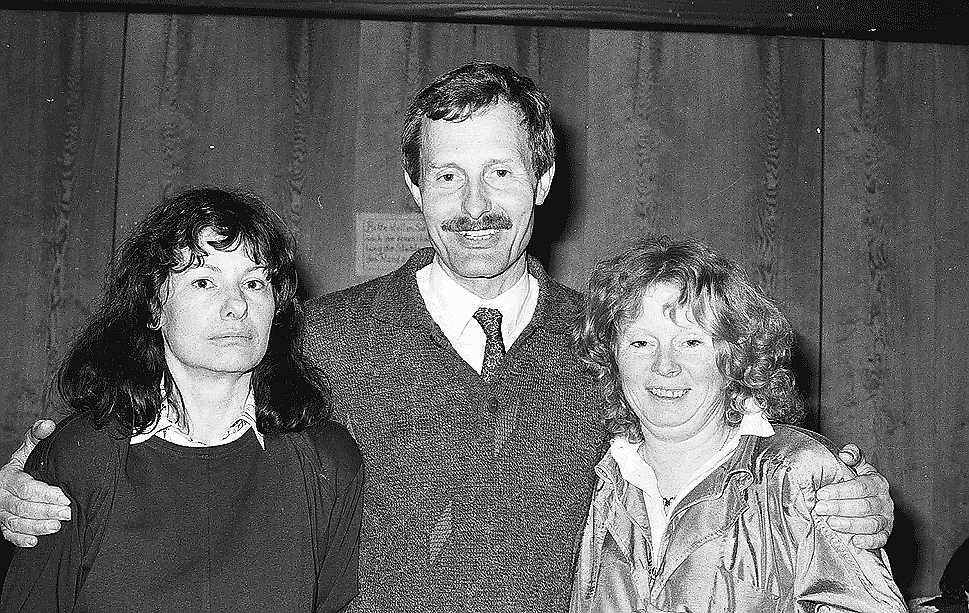
- Queitsch (right) in 1987

Member of the Landtag of Baden-Württemberg
- In office 1 June 2001 – 30 April 2011

Personal details
- Born: 12 June 1946 Lindau, Bavaria, Allied-occupied Germany
- Died: 18 February 2026 (aged 79) Freiburg im Breisgau, Baden-Württemberg, Germany
- Party: SPD
- Occupation: Retail salesperson

Margot Queitsch (12 June 1946 – 18 February 2026) was a German politician. A member of the Social Democratic Party, she served in the Landtag of Baden-Württemberg from 2001 to 2011.

Queitsch died in Freiburg im Breisgau on 18 February 2026, at the age of 79.
