= Aaron Pegram =

American operatic tenor (1974-2026)

- Born: November 10, 1974; Oklahoma City, Oklahoma, U.S.
- Died: February 8, 2026 (aged 51); Dresden, Germany
- Education: University of Tulsa
- Occupation: Operatic tenor

Aaron Pegram (November 10, 1974 - February 8, 2026) was an American operatic tenor. Initially trained in musical theater at the University of Tulsa, his career in opera began in 2003, when he joined the Orlando Opera. For them, he performed in The Mikado by Arthur Sullivan in 2005 and in L'elisir d'amore by Gaetano Donizetti the following year. In 2009, he relocated to Dresden, Germany to perform at the Semperoper in productions of The Love for Three Oranges by Sergei Prokofiev, Turandot by Giacomo Puccini, and Eugene Onegin by Pyotr Ilyich Tchaikovsky. He also performed for the Santa Fe Opera, including as Don Basilio in The Marriage of Figaro by Mozart in 2008 and as Baron Puck in La Grande-Duchesse de Gérolstein by Jacques Offenbach in 2013.
