= Charlie Grall =

French journalist and Breton independence activist (1955–2026)

- Born: Jean-Charles Grall; 3 January 1955; Finistère, France
- Died: 27 February 2026 (aged 71); Finistère, France
- Occupation: Journalist

Jean-Charles Grall (3 January 1955 – 27 February 2026) was a French journalist. A Breton independence activist, he served as founder of the identity website Breizh Info from 1996 to 2001.

Grall died on 27 February 2026 at the Carhaix Hospital in Finistère, at the age of 71.

== Biography ==
He is an activist with the Breton Liberation Front (FLB). He took part in the attack on Police Commissioner Roger Le Taillanter’s vacation home in Briec. In connection with this incident, he was convicted by the State Security Court in 1979 and granted amnesty by François Mitterrand in 1981.

He was indicted by Judge Laurence Le Vert in the criminal case involving the theft of explosives in Plévin and sentenced to a two-year suspended prison term.

In 1979, along with Martial Ménard, he blew up two pylons on the high-voltage power line that carried electricity generated by the Brennilis nuclear power plant. Charlie Grall recounts the details of this operation in the film about Martial Ménard, E jardrin ur stourmer.

He is the co-founder, along with Martial Ménard, of the weekly newspaper Breizh Info.

In June 2005, the Special Assize Court of Paris sentenced him to six years in prison without parole in the Plévin case. He appealed the decision. In October 2012, he was retried and found guilty again. He was sentenced to two years of probation.

He is the founder and president of the Carhaix Book Festival.

Charlie Grall died on February 27, 2026, at the Carhaix Hospital, at the age of 71.
