= Usman Idris Kusfa =

Nigerian Islamic cleric (1968/1969–2026)

Usman Idris Kusfa (1968 or 1969 – 2 February 2026), popularly known as Rigi-Rigi, was a Nigerian Islamic cleric based in Zaria, Kaduna State. He was widely recognized for his teachings in Islam and for his influence on social media platforms where he shared religious knowledge.

== Life and career ==
Kusfa emerged as a prominent Islamic cleric in Zaria, Kaduna State, where he became widely known for his religious guidance and sermons. He was a senior figure in the community and attracted numerous followers who attended his lectures and teachings. His influence extended beyond local circles through social media platforms, where he shared Islamic teachings and guidance.

He was recognized for his contributions to Islamic education in northern Nigeria and for mentoring students and younger clerics. Kusfa balanced his religious work with family life, being survived by four wives and 37 children.

Kusfa died on 2 February 2026, at the age of 57, after battling an illness. His funeral prayers were held in Kusfa, Zaria City, and were attended by local leaders, students, and community members, reflecting his status as a respected Islamic scholar.
