= Charles Bailleul =

French linguist and missionary (1927–2026)

- Born: 21 December 1927; Lille, France
- Died: 9 February 2026 (aged 99); Bry-sur-Marne, France
- Occupations: Linguist; Missionary

Charles Bailleul (French: [ʃaʁl bajœl]; 21 December 1927 – 9 February 2026) was a French linguist and Roman Catholic missionary, a member of the White Fathers.

Also known by the name Baabilen Kulubali, he was vicar of a parish in Kolokani, Mali from 1986 to 1992. From 1992 to 2009, he participated in various language-related projects, including the translations of dictionaries, proverbs, a book on medicinal plants, and illustrated tales.

Bailleul died in Bry-sur-Marne on 9 February 2026, at the age of 98.

== Publications ==
- La petite souris qui a perdu son enfant (1997)
- Monsieur Déchéance (1997)
- Vieux comme le monde (1997)
- Fais-toi des amis (2000)
- Sabu ka furu ko (2002)
- Le mariage de Sabou (2002)
- Cours pratique de bambara (2005)
- Sagesse bambara (2005)
- Dictionnaire français-bambara (2006)
- Dictionnaire bambara-français (2007)
- Richesses médicinales (2009)
- Espèces arbustives spontanées du Burkina-Faso, du Mali et du Sénégal... (2015)
- Ta-Tè-Nya (2016)
- Contes du Bèlèdougou (2017)
- Fais-toi des amis (2018)
- La petite souris qui a perdu son enfant (2018)
- Vieux comme le monde (2018)
- Monsieur Déchéance (2018)
