= Trevor Wilson (footballer) =

Australian rules footballer (1950–2026)

Personal information
- Full name: Trevor Wilson
- Born: 10 December 1950
- Died: 14 February 2026 (aged 75); Wonthaggi, Victoria, Australia
- Original team: Essex Heights
- Height: 177 cm (5 ft 10 in)
- Weight: 81 kg (179 lb)

Playing career
Years	Club	Games (Goals)
1970	Richmond	2 (2)
1971	Footscray	1 (0)
Total		3 (2)

Trevor Wilson (10 December 1950 – 14 February 2026) was an Australian rules footballer who played with Richmond and Footscray in the Victorian Football League (VFL). Wilson died on 14 February 2026, at the age of 75.
