= Steven P. Brennan =

American property master and set dresser (1967–2026)

- Born: January 9, 1967; Massachusetts, U.S.
- Died: February 28, 2026 (aged 59); Wellfleet, Massachusetts, U.S.
- Education: University of Massachusetts Amherst
- Occupations: Property master, set dresser

Steven P. Brennan (January 9, 1967 – February 28, 2026) was an American property master and set dresser. He was best known for his set dressing work in the films Hard Eight, John Wick: Chapter 2, Free Guy, American Hustle, Shutter Island and Greyhound.

In 1996, Brennan art directed his first and only film Box of Moonlight, starring John Turturro, Sam Rockwell, Catherine Keener and Lisa Blount. In 1997, he set dressed the first season of The WB supernatural horror drama television series Buffy the Vampire Slayer, starring Sarah Michelle Gellar.

Brennan died from complications of ALS in Wellfleet, Massachusetts, on February 28, 2026, at the age of 59.
