= Francesco Sibello =

Italian yacht racer (1945–2026)

Francesco Sibello (4 May 1945 – 24 February 2026) was an Italian yacht racer who competed in the 1972 Summer Olympics. He was born in Alassio on 4 May 1945, and died in Monserrato on 24 February 2026, at the age of 80.
