= Bert Broekhuis =

Dutch politician (1943–2026)

Member of the House of Representatives of the Netherlands
- In office 15 September 1981 – 15 September 1982

Personal details
- Born: Engelbert Willem Hendrik Broekhuis; 14 February 1943 The Hague, German-occupied Netherlands
- Died: 7 February 2026 (aged 82) Oud-Beijerland, Netherlands
- Party: PvdA
- Education: Vrije Universiteit Amsterdam
- Occupation: Urban planner

Engelbert Willem Hendrik "Bert" Broekhuis (14 February 1943 – 7 February 2026) was a Dutch politician. A member of the Labour Party, he served in the House of Representatives from 1981 to 1982. He was mayor of Cromstrijen between 1984 and 1988. He was acting mayor of Bernisse from 1998 until 2000, when he became the formally appointed mayor. Broekhuis served until June 2005.

Broekhuis died in Oud-Beijerland on 7 February 2026, at the age of 82.
