= Vasco Ascolini =

Italian photographer (1937–2026)

- Born: 10 May 1937; Reggio Emilia, Italy
- Died: 10 February 2026 (aged 88); Reggio Emilia, Italy
- Education: University of Parma
- Occupation: Photographer

Vasco Ascolini (10 May 1937 – 10 February 2026) was an Italian photographer.

Fron 1973 to 1990, he collaborated with the Teatro Municipale in Reggio Emilia and took many series of photographs, which can be found at the Fondazione Italiana per la Fotografia di Torino, the Musée Carnavalet, and the Bibliothèque nationale de France. He also held exhibitions at the Rencontres d'Arles, the Nicéphore Niépce Museum, and the Louvre.

Ascolini died in Reggio Emilia on 10 February 2026, at the age of 88.

== Distinction ==
- Knight of the Ordre des Arts et des Lettres (2000)
