= Paulette Collet =

Belgian essayist and academic (1926–2026)

- Born: 1926/1927; Verviers, Belgium
- Died: 13 February 2026 (aged 99)
- Education: King's College London; Université Laval
- Occupations: Essayist, academic

Paulette Collet (1926/1927 – 13 February 2026) was a Belgian essayist and academic.

== Life and career ==
Born in Verviers in 1926, Collet fled to London at the onset of World War II, where she earned a bachelor's degree from King's College London and subsequently pursued a master's degree and doctorate from the Université Laval in Quebec City.

From 1950 to 1952, Collet taught at the Lycée de Londres before working as a professor at the Kansas State Teachers College, Saint Peter's College, and the University of St. Michael's College. She primarily taught literature and theatre. She received the Prix Raymond-Casgrain for her 1966 essay L’Hiver dans le roman canadien-français, receiving praise from Jean Éthier-Blais and criticism from Adrien Thério, Laurent Mailhot, and Jean-Charles Falardeau. She dedicated numerous works to Jean Racine and Molière. In 2024, she was honored with the Prix Jean-Baptiste Rousseaux.

Collet died on 13 February 2026, at the age of 99.

== Works ==
- L’Hiver dans le roman canadien-français (1966)
- Roger-François Thépot (1972)
- Modern French. A Grammar Review (1973)
- Marie Le Franc : deux parties, deux exils (1976)
- Les Romanciers français et le Canada (1842–1981) : Anthologie (1984)
