= Tânia Rodrigues =

Brazilian politician (1950–2026)

Member of the Legislative Assembly of Rio de Janeiro
- In office 1 February 2015 – 31 January 2019
- In office 1 February 1995 – 31 January 2003

Personal details
- Born: Tânia Regina Pereira Rodrigues; 19 April 1950 Niterói, Rio de Janeiro, Brazil
- Died: 11 February 2026 (aged 75) Niterói, Rio de Janeiro, Brazil
- Party: PDT
- Education: Fluminense Federal University
- Occupation: Doctor

Tânia Regina Pereira Rodrigues (19 April 1950 – 11 February 2026) was a Brazilian politician. A member of the Democratic Labour Party, she served in the Legislative Assembly of Rio de Janeiro from 1995 to 2003 and again from 2015 to 2019.

Rodrigues died in Niterói on 11 February 2026, at the age of 75.
