= Mario Merlino =

Italian neo-fascist activist (1944–2026)

- Born: Mario Michele Merlino; 2 June 1944; Rome, Italy
- Died: 4 February 2026 (aged 81); Rome, Italy
- Education: Sapienza University of Rome
- Occupations: Activist; Writer

Mario Michele Merlino (2 June 1944 – 4 February 2026) was an Italian neo-fascist and anarchist activist, historian, and writer.

Born into a family of staunch fascists, he participated in the Battle of Valle Giulia on behalf of the National Vanguard. He then converted to anarchism and was accused of involvement in the Piazza Fontana bombing before being cleared. Later in his life, he returned to the far-right and was an adamant supporter of the Ukrainian nationalist organization Right Sector.

Merlino died in Rome on 4 February 2026, at the age of 81.
