= Assad Ali =

Syrian professor of Arabic literature (1937–2026)

Assad Ali (Arabic: أسعد علي; 5 April 1937 – 6 February 2026) was a Syrian professor of Arabic literature at the University of Damascus and prolific writer of contemporary Arabic poetry. He was also the founder and chairman of the World Union of Arabic Writers. His writings dealt extensively with spiritual topics, with particular emphasis on Islamic mysticism and the Sufi tradition. One collection of his poems, Happiness without Death (1991), was published by Threshold Books in an English translation by Camille Helminski, Ibrahim Yahya Shihabi, and Kabir Helminski. Ali died on 6 February 2026, at the age of 88.
