= Hans-Georg Fritz =

German politician (1932–2026)

Member of the Landtag of Hesse
- In office 18 December 1973 – 30 November 1974

Personal details
- Born: 5 April 1932 Frankfurt, Hesse-Nassau, Prussia, Germany
- Died: 26 February 2026 (aged 93)
- Party: SPD
- Occupation: Trade unionist

Hans-Georg Fritz (5 April 1932 – 26 February 2026) was a German politician. A member of the Social Democratic Party, he served in the Landtag of Hesse from 1973 to 1974.

Fritz died on 6 March 2026, at the age of 93.
