= Hellmut Lorenz =

Austrian art historian (1942–2026)

- Born: 11 June 1942; Vienna, Germany
- Died: 6 February 2026 (aged 83)
- Education: University of Vienna
- Occupation: Art historian

Hellmut Lorenz (11 June 1942 – 6 February 2026) was an Austrian art historian.

Lorenz was a longtime professor at the University of Salzburg and the Free University of Berlin and was notably the 2012 recipient of the Wilhelm Hartel Prize from the Austrian Academy of Sciences.

Lorenz died on 6 February 2026, at the age of 83.

== Publications ==
- Studien zum architektonischen und architekturtheoretischen Werk L.B. Albertis (1972)
- Wiener Fassaden des 19. Jahrhunderts – Wohnhäuser in Mariahilf (1976)
- Domenico Martinelli (1650–1719) und die österreichische Barockarchitektur (1983)
- Liechtenstein Palaces in Vienna from the Age of the Baroque (1985)
- Domenico Martinelli und die österreichische Barockarchitektur (1991)
- Johann Bernhard Fischer von Erlach (1992)
- Berliner Baukunst der Barockzeit. Die Zeichnungen und Notizen aus dem Reisetagebuch des Architekten Christoph Pitzler (1657–1707) (1998)
- Barock (1999)
- Herrenhäuser in Brandenburg und der Niederlausitz. Kommentierte Neuausgabe des Ansichtenwerkes von Alexander Duncker (1857–1883) (2000)
- Palais Daun-Kinsky (2001)
- Das barocke Wien. Die Kupferstiche von Joseph Emanuel Fischer von Erlach und Johann Adam Delsenbach (1719) (2007)
- Die Österreichische Präsidentschaftskanzlei in der Wiener Hofburg (2008)
