= Coca Boom =

Spanish drag queen (1997–2026)

David Parra (24 October 1997 – 14 February 2026), known professionally as Coca Boom, was a Spanish drag artiste. She was the winner of the first season of Regias del Drag España, known for her work as a seamstress and designer in many seasons of Drag Race España.

Outside of drag, Boom worked as a costume designer and airport flight attendant.

== Life and career ==
Boom was born as David Parra on 24 October 1997. She is from Malaga.

On 18 February 2022, Boom was placed third in the Torremolinos Drag Queen Gala at the Príncipe de Asturias Auditorium in Torremolinos. In May 2022, a report in Diario Sur highlighted the drag scene in Torremolinos. In June 2022, she was also among the performers at the 2nd Seville Drag Gala.

On 2 June 2023, she was one of the featured performers at the second edition of the drag gala "The Queen Deluxe," which took place in Huelva. In June 2025, she also performed at Costa del Sol town Torremolinos Pride 2025.

Boom died on 14 February 2026, at the age of 28.
