= Antonio Mereu =

Italian politician (1943–2026)

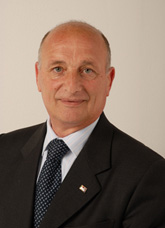
- Mereu in 2006

Member of the Chamber of Deputies of Italy for Sardinia
- In office 19 May 2001 – 14 March 2013

Personal details
- Born: 22 January 1943 Sant'Antioco, Italy
- Died: 10 February 2026 (aged 83) Carbonia, Italy
- Party: UdC
- Education: Istituto tecnico per geometri
- Occupation: Clerk

Antonio Mereu (22 January 1943 – 10 February 2026) was an Italian politician. A member of the Union of the Centre, he served in the Chamber of Deputies from 2001 to 2013.

Mereu died in Carbonia on 10 February 2026, at the age of 83.
