= Marian Potograbski =

Polish writer (died 2026)

- Born: Marian Jan Potograbski
- Died: 12 February 2026
- Occupation: Writer

Marian Jan Potograbski (died 12 February 2026) was a Polish writer. A researcher of the 1956 Poznań protests, he was a recipient of the Silver Cross of Merit of Poland (2006).

Potograbski died on 12 February 2026.
