= William M. Bugg =

American physicist (1931–2026)

- Born: William Maurice Bugg; January 23, 1931; St. Louis, Missouri, U.S.
- Died: February 19, 2026 (aged 95); Knoxville, Tennessee, U.S.
- Education: Washington University in St. Louis; University of Tennessee
- Occupation: Physicist
- Spouse: Marian Sly (died. 2008)

William Maurice Bugg (January 23, 1931 – February 19, 2026) was an American physicist.

== Early life and career ==
Bugg was born in St. Louis, Missouri on January 23, 1931, the son of Maurice Ancel Bugg and Abbie Ruth. He attended Oak Ridge High School, graduating in 1948. After graduating, he attended Washington University in St. Louis, earning his undergraduate degree in 1952, which after earning his degree, he served as an instructor at the Antiaircraft and Guide Missile School in Fort Bliss. After his discharge, he attended the University of Tennessee, earning his PhD degree in physics 1959.

Bugg served as a professor in the department of physics at the University of Tennessee from 1968 to 1996. During his years as a professor, in 1974, he was elected as a fellow of the American Physical Society.

== Personal life and death ==
Bugg was married to Marian Sly. Their marriage lasted until her death in 2008.

Bugg died in Knoxville, Tennessee on February 19, 2026, at the age of 95.
