= Karim al-Mulla =

Iraqi politician (1942–2026)

- كريم محمود حسين الملا

Minister of Youth
- In office 14 April 1977 – 28 June 1982
- Preceded by: Burhan Mustafa
- Succeeded by: Ahmad Husayn Khudayir as-Samarrai

Personal details
- Born: 9 June 1942 Baghdad, Iraq
- Died: 18 February 2026 (aged 83) Amman, Jordan
- Party: Ba'ath Party
- Occupation: Civil servant

Karim al-Mulla (Arabic: كريم محمود حسين الملا; 9 June 1942 – 18 February 2026) was an Iraqi politician. A member of the Ba'ath Party, he served as Minister of Youth from 1977 to 1982.

Al-Mulla died in Amman on 18 February 2026.
