= Lucien Ghellynck =

Belgian footballer (1943–2026)

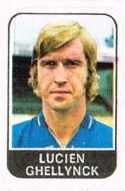
- Ghellynck in 1973

Personal information
- Date of birth: 29 September 1943
- Place of birth: Ghent, German-occupied Belgium and Northern France
- Date of death: 12 February 2026 (aged 82)
- Position: Midfielder

Youth career
- 1958–1961: Gent

Senior career*
Years	Team	Apps	(Gls)
1961–1976	Gent	248	(28)
1976–1977	KWSC Lauwe		
Total		248	(28)

International career
1961–1962	Belgium U19	6	(0)
1962	Belgium U21	1	(0)
1963–1969	Belgium B	10	(1)
- * Club domestic league appearances and goals

Lucien Ghellynck (29 September 1943 – 12 February 2026) was a Belgian footballer who played as a midfielder.

Ghellynck notably won the Belgian Cup in 1964 with Gent, with which he spent almost his entire career. He received one call-up to the national team, but never actually played. He was also pre-selected for the 1970 FIFA World Cup, but was ultimately left out.

Ghellynck died on 12 February 2026, at the age of 82.
