= Sarla Maheshwari (journalist) =

Indian television journalist (1954–2026)

- Born: 11 April 1954
- Died: 12 February 2026 (aged 71); New Delhi, India
- Spouse: Pawan Maheshawari
- Children: 2 sons

Sarla Maheshwari (11 April 1954 – 12 February 2026) was an Indian journalist who worked as a news reader with DD National. Her career spanned from 1976 to 2005.

== Early life and education ==
Sarla Maheshwari was born on 11 April 1954. She completed her BA & MA in Hindi at the University of Delhi and later did her PhD also at the same university. While still a doctoral student, she auditioned and was selected as an announcer for Doordarshan in 1976, marking the beginning of her career in television broadcasting. She also served as a lecturer at Hansraj College. In 1984, she married Pawan Maheswari, a gastroenterologist and together they had two sons, Himanshu Maheshwari and Kavish Maheshwari, a plastic surgeon.

== Career ==
Maheshwari began her broadcasting career with Doordarshan in 1976 as an announcer and later transitioned to reading the news, becoming one of the channel's key presenters during a period when it was the principal source of television news in India. Her career spanned nearly three decades, during which she became known for her measured delivery and credibility among viewers.

During her career, Maheshwari also worked briefly abroad in the United Kingdom as a newsreader with the BBC before returning to India and re-joining Doordarshan. She witnessed the evolution of television news from black-and-white broadcasts to colour programming and emerging media formats. She was one of the first to anchor colour telecasts during Asian Games in New Delhi.

== Later life and death ==
After retiring from Doordarshan in 2005, Maheshwari remained a respected figure among former colleagues and audiences. She died in New Delhi on 12 February 2026, at the age of 71. Her last rites were done on the same day at Nigambodh Shamshan Ghat, Delhi. Her death was widely reported by national media, and Doordarshan National paid tribute to her contributions to Indian television journalism.
