= Horst Gallert =

German politician (1937–2026)

Member of the Landtag of Saxony
- In office 27 October 1990 – 6 October 1994

Personal details
- Born: 23 July 1937 Bautzen, Gau Saxony, Germany
- Died: 2 February 2026 (aged 88)
- Party: CDU
- Education: Berufsakademie Bautzen
- Occupation: Technologist

Horst Gallert (23 July 1937 – 2 February 2026) was a German politician. A member of the Christian Democratic Union, he served in the Landtag of Saxony from 1990 to 1994.

Gallert died on 2 February 2026, at the age of 88.
