= Robert Daverman =

American topologist (1941–2026)

Robert Jay Daverman (September 28, 1941 – February 9, 2026) was an American topologist.

== Life and career ==
Daverman was born in Grand Rapids, Michigan, on September 28, 1941. He earned a bachelor's degree in 1963 from Calvin College and pursued doctoral study under R. H. Bing at the University of Wisconsin–Madison. After completing his thesis Locally Fenced 2-spheres in S^{3} in 1967, Daverman began teaching at the University of Tennessee–Knoxville. While on the Knoxville faculty, Daverman served on the American Mathematical Society's Committee on Science Policy. By the time he was selected as one of the inaugural fellows of the AMS in 2012, Daverman had gained emeritus status. Daverman died on February 9, 2026, at the age of 84.

== Selected publications ==
- Daverman, Robert J. (1986). Decompositions of Manifolds. Academic Press. ISBN 9780122042201.
- Daverman, Robert J. (2009). Embeddings in Manifolds. American Mathematical Society. ISBN 9780821836972.
