= Norma Presmeg =

Mathematics education researcher (1942–2026)

- Born: 1942; South Africa
- Died: February 25, 2026 (aged 83); Maryville, Tennessee, United States
- Education: Rhodes University (mathematics and physics), University of Natal (MEd), University of Cambridge (PhD)
- Occupations: mathematician, researcher
- Notable work: Transitions Between Contexts of Mathematical Practices (edited with Guida de Abreu and Alan Bishop, Kluwer Academic Publishers, 2002)

Norma Christine Presmeg (1942 – February 25, 2026) was a mathematics education researcher whose work has concerned mathematical visualization, semiotics, and ethnomathematics, and their role in secondary-school mathematics teaching and learning. Presmeg was originally from South Africa, was educated in South Africa and England, and worked in the US, where she was professor emeritus of mathematics at Illinois State University. She died on February 25, 2026, aged 83.

== Education and career ==
Presmeg had a bachelor's degree in mathematics and physics from Rhodes University in South Africa, with bachelor's honours in mathematics and a bachelor's degree in education from the University of Natal. She taught high school mathematics in South Africa from the mid-1960s to the late 1970s, and earned a master's degree in education in 1980 at the University of Natal. She completed a Ph.D. at the University of Cambridge in England, in 1985. Her dissertation, The Role of Visually Mediated Processes in High School Mathematics: A Classroom Investigation, was supervised by Alan J. Bishop.

After returning to South Africa for a five-year stint at the University of Durban-Westville, she moved to the US in 1990, as a faculty member in Curriculum and Instruction at Florida State University. Ten years later, she moved to Illinois State University, where she retired as a professor emeritus.

== Selected publications ==
Presmeg's books include:

- Transitions Between Contexts of Mathematical Practices (edited with Guida de Abreu and Alan Bishop, Kluwer Academic Publishers, 2002)
- Critical Issues in Mathematics Education: Major Contributions of Alan Bishop (edited with Philip Clarkson, Springer, 2008)
- Approaches to Qualitative Research in Mathematics Education: Examples of Methodology and Methods (edited with Angelika Bikner-Ahsbahs and Christine Knipping, Springer, 2014)
- Semiotics in Mathematics Education (with Luis Radford, Wolff-Michael Roth, and Gert Kadunz, Springer, 2016)
- Signs of Signification: Semiotics in Mathematics Education Research (edited with Luis Radford, Wolff-Michael Roth, and Gert Kadunz, Springer, 2018)
- Compendium for Early Career Researchers in Mathematics Education (edited with Gabriele Kaiser, Springer, 2019)

Her research and survey papers include:

- Presmeg, Norma C. (August 1986), "Visualisation and mathematical giftedness", Educational Studies in Mathematics, 17 (3): 297–311, doi:10.1007/bf00305075
- Presmeg, Norma C. (November 1986), "Visualisation in high school mathematics", For the Learning of Mathematics, 6 (3): 42–46
- Presmeg, Norma C. (December 1992), "Prototypes, metaphors, metonymies and imaginative rationality in high school mathematics", Educational Studies in Mathematics, 23 (6): 595–610, doi:10.1007/bf00540062
- Aspinwall, Leslie; Shaw, Kenneth L.; Presmeg, Norma C. (1996), "Uncontrollable mental imagery: graphical connections between a function and its derivative", Educational Studies in Mathematics, 33 (3): 301–317, doi:10.1023/a:1002976729261
- Presmeg, Norma C. (1998), "Ethnomathematics in teacher education", Journal of Mathematics Teacher Education, 1 (3): 317–339, doi:10.1023/a:1009946219294
- Presmeg, Norma (January 2006), "Research on visualization in learning and teaching mathematics: emergence from psychology", Handbook of Research on the Psychology of Mathematics Education, BRILL, pp. 205–235, doi:10.1163/9789087901127_009, ISBN 9789077874660
- Presmeg, Norma (February 2006), "Semiotics and the "connections" standard: significance of semiotics for teachers of mathematics", Educational Studies in Mathematics, 61 (1–2): 163–182, doi:10.1007/s10649-006-3365-z
