= Rab Nawaz =

Pakistani cricketer and umpire (1940–2026)

Rab Nawaz رب نواز
Personal information
- Born: 17 October 1940; Lahore, Punjab Province, British India
- Died: February 2026 (aged 85); Lahore, Punjab, Pakistan

Umpiring information
- ODIs umpired: 2 (1982–1984)
- Source: Cricinfo, 26 May 2014

Rab Nawaz (Urdu: رب نواز; 17 October 1940 – February 2026) was a Pakistani cricketer and umpire. He stood in two ODI games between 1982 and 1984.

== Umpiring career ==
He made his umpiring debut in match between Pakistan and Sri Lanka at Gaddafi Stadium in Lahore on 29 March 1982 and officiated his last ODI match between Pakistan and New Zealand at the Sialkot Cricket Stadium on 2 December 1984.

== Death ==
Nawaz's death in Lahore was announced on 23 February 2026. He was aged 85 and had suffered a prolonged illness.

== See also ==
- List of One Day International cricket umpires
