= Amnat Sonimsat =

Thai politician (1933–2026)

- อำนาจ สอนอิ่มสาตร์
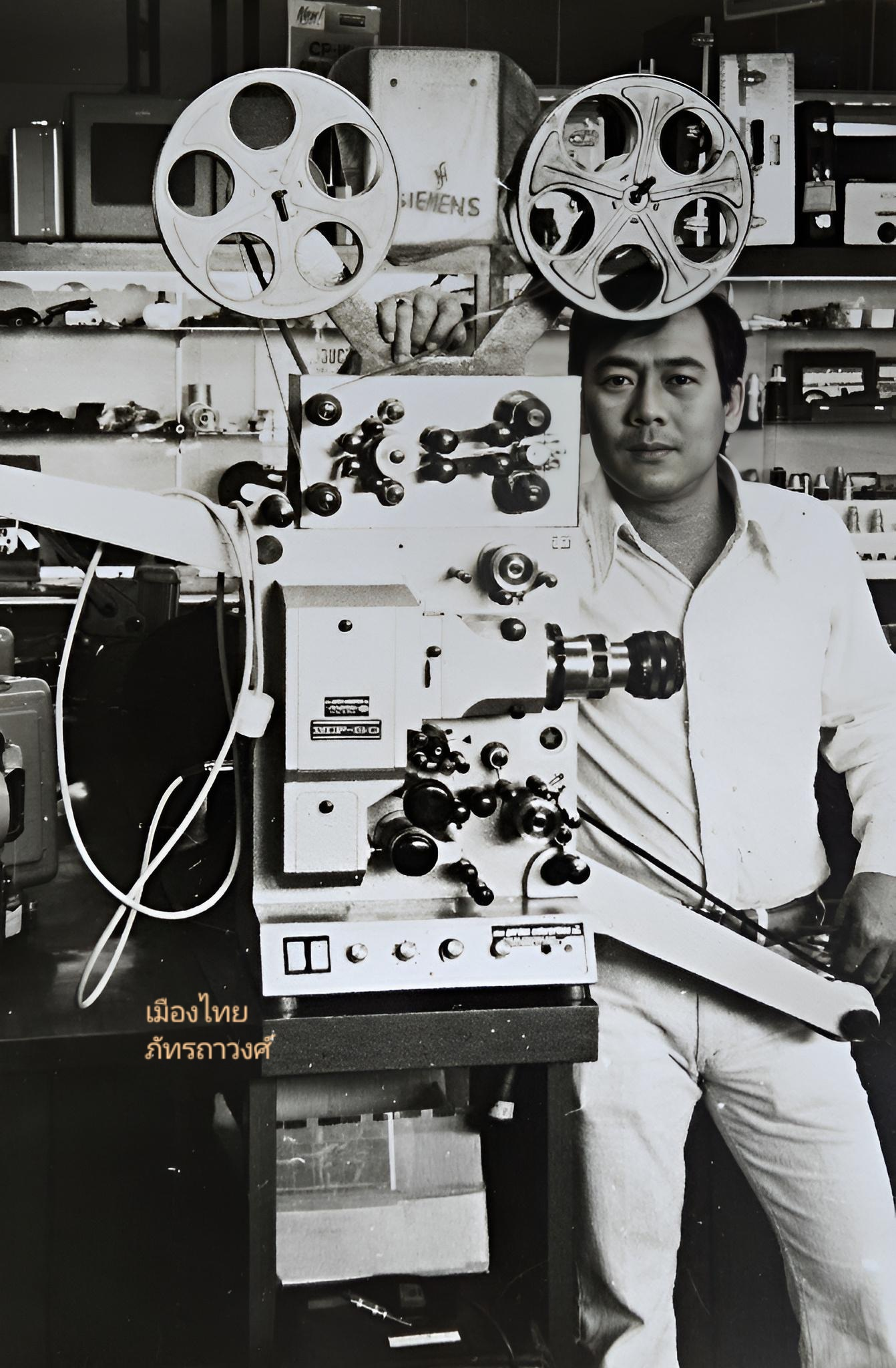
- Sonimsat in the 1960s

Member of the Senate of Thailand
- In office 22 March 1992 – 21 March 2000

Member of the National Legislative Assembly of Thailand
- In office 29 March 1991 – 21 March 1992

Personal details
- Born: 19 October 1933 Bangkok, Siam
- Died: 22 February 2026 (aged 92)
- Party: Independent
- Education: Rajamangala University of Technology Krungthep
- Occupation: Actor

Amnat Sonimsat (Thai: อำนาจ สอนอิ่มสาตร์; 19 October 1933 – 22 February 2026) was a Thai politician. An independent, he served in the National Legislative Assembly from 1991 to 1992 and in the Senate from 1992 to 2000.

Sonimsat died on 22 February 2026, at the age of 92.
