= Sékou Ouédraogo =

Burkinabé cinematographer (1937–2026)

- Born: 1937
- Died: 20 February 2026 (aged 88–89)
- Occupation: Cinematographer

Sékou Ouédraogo (1937 – 20 February 2026) was a Burkinabé cinematographer.

Ouédraogo is considered to be one of Burkina Faso's first cinematographers, starting his career in the 1960s, when local film industry was limited. He was also part of the generation of technicians that developed the country's audiovisual sector. In 1969, he took part in organizing the first-ever Panafrican Film and Television Festival of Ouagadougou. In 1985, he helped produce the film Jours de Tourmentes.

Ouédraogo died on 20 February 2026.
