= Richard W. Mansbach =

American political scientist (1943–2026)

Richard Wallace Mansbach (January 3, 1943 – February 5, 2026) was an American political scientist.

== Life and career ==
Richard Mansbach was born in Brooklyn on January 3, 1943, and raised alongside two older brothers. Mansbach studied political science, history, and Spanish at Swarthmore College and graduated in 1964. He then attended the University of Oxford as a Marshall Scholar. After completing his dissertation, Mansbach joined the Swarthmore College faculty, in 1967. He became an assistant professor in 1968. Mansbach remained at Swarthmore for two years. While teaching at Rutgers University, Mansbach was named a fellow of the American Council on Education in 1981, and worked for the Central Intelligence Agency. He later moved to Iowa State University.

From 1999 to 2004, Mansbach was a co-editor of International Studies Quarterly, an official journal of the International Studies Association. The ISA's Midwest Region had previously awarded Mansbach and Yale H. Ferguson the Lynne Rienner/Quincy Wright Award for their coauthored 1996 book, Polities: Authority, Identities, and Change. In 2014, Mansbach received the ISA's James N. Rosenau Award. In 2017, the ISA convened a Distinguished Scholar Panel to honor Mansbach and Ferguson. ISA–Midwest honored Mansbach again in 2021, with the Quincy Wright Distinguished Scholar Award.

Mansbach died on February 5, 2026, at the age of 83.

== Selected books ==
- Mansbach, Richard W.; Ferguson, Yale H.; Lampert, Donald E. (1976). The Web of World Politics: Nonstate Actors in the Global System. Prentice-Hall. ISBN 9780139479526.
- Mansbach, Richard W.; Vasquez, John A. (1981). In Search of Theory: A New Paradigm for Global Politics. Columbia University Press. ISBN 9780231050609.
- Ferguson, Yale H.; Mansbach, Richard W. (1988). The Elusive Quest: Theory and International Politics. University of South Carolina Press. ISBN 9780872495708.
- Ferguson, Yale H.; Mansbach, Richard W. (1996). Polities: authority, identities and change. University of South Carolina Press. ISBN 9781570031281.
- Ferguson, Yale H.; Mansbach, Richard W. (2012). Globalization: The Return of Borders to a Borderless World. Routledge. ISBN 9780415521970.
- Mansbach, Richard W.; Taylor, Kirsten L. (2012). Introduction to Global Politics. Routledge. ISBN 9780415782722.
