= Ignacy Guenther =

Polish politician (1937–2026)

Member of the Sejm
- In office 18 June 1989 – 25 November 1991

Personal details
- Born: Ignacy Marian Guenther; 1 February 1937 Nowy Dwór, Poland
- Died: 13 February 2026 (aged 89)
- Party: OKP
- Occupation: Farmer

Ignacy Marian Guenther (1 February 1937 – 13 February 2026) was a Polish politician. A member of the Obywatelski Klub Parlamentarny, he served in the Sejm from 1989 to 1991.

Guenther died on 13 February 2026, at the age of 89.
