= Bogusław Wąs =

Polish politician (1952–2026)

Member of the Sejm
- In office 18 June 1989 – 25 November 1991

Personal details
- Born: 18 February 1952 Czajęcice, Poland
- Died: 14 February 2026 (aged 73)
- Party: PKLD
- Occupation: Electromechanic

Bogusław Wąs (18 February 1952 – 14 February 2026) was a Polish politician. A member of the Parlamentarny Klub Lewicy Demokratycznej, he served in the Sejm from 1989 to 1991.

Wąs died on 14 February 2026, at the age of 73.
