= Deo A. Koenigs =

American politician

Member of the Iowa House of Representatives
- In office 1983–1999

Personal details
- Born: January 30, 1935 (age 91) Mitchell County, Iowa, United States
- Party: Democratic
- Occupation: farmer

Dionysius A. Koenigs (January 30, 1935 – February 18, 2026) was an American politician in the state of Iowa.

Koenigs was born in Mitchell County, Iowa. He was a farmer. He served in the Iowa House of Representatives from 1983 to 1999, as a Democrat.
