= Luc-Russel Adjaho =

Togolese evangelical pastor (died 2026)

- Died: 5 February 2026; Lomé, Togo
- Occupation: Evangelical pastor

Luc-Russel Adjaho (died 5 February 2026) was a Togolese evangelical pastor.

== Biography ==
Adjaho worked as a bailiff before involving himself in the pastoral ministry within the evangelical movement. He founded the Église de Dieu et de la Prophétie "Zion-To", a Togolese Christian community. He became known to a wider audience from his broadcasts on Christian content and his translation of films. In April 2025, rumours swarmed on social media about his death, rumours which were denied and publicly refuted by Adjaho himself.

Luc-Russel Adjaho died in Lomé on 5 February 2026.
