= Donald Leo Dietmeyer =

American electrical engineer and educator

- Born: November 20, 1932; Wausau, Wisconsin, U.S.
- Died: February 13, 2026 (aged 93)
- Engineering career
- Discipline: Electrical engineering
- Institutions: University of Wisconsin–Madison
- Projects: Logic Design of Digital Systems (Textbook)
- Awards: IEEE Fellow (1987)

Donald Leo Dietmeyer (20 November 1932 – 13 February 2026) was an American electrical engineer and educator, who worked in the fields of Computer-Aided Design (CAD) and digital logic synthesis. He was Professor Emeritus at the University of Wisconsin–Madison, where he worked on digital systems, logic design, and computer-aided design.

In 1971, Dietmeyer's textbook, Logic Design of Digital Systems, was published by Allyn & Bacon. His research focused on the automation of the design process, specifically in the areas of switching theory, hardware description languages, and the decomposition of Boolean functions. This research contributed to the development of Electronic Design Automation (EDA) tools used to create integrated circuits.

Dietmeyer served as the associate dean for academic affairs at the University of Wisconsin's College of Engineering. In recognition of his contributions to the automation of digital systems design and his influence on engineering education, he was elected a Fellow of the IEEE in 1987. His work included developing algorithms used to synthesize logic gates in digital systems.

== Digital Design Language (DDL) Systems ==
The syntax and semantics of DDL, as a component of Hardware Description Languages (HDLs), were structured to mirror the hierarchical block organization of the systems being described.
