= Marlies Krämer =

German politician, feminist and author (1937–2026)

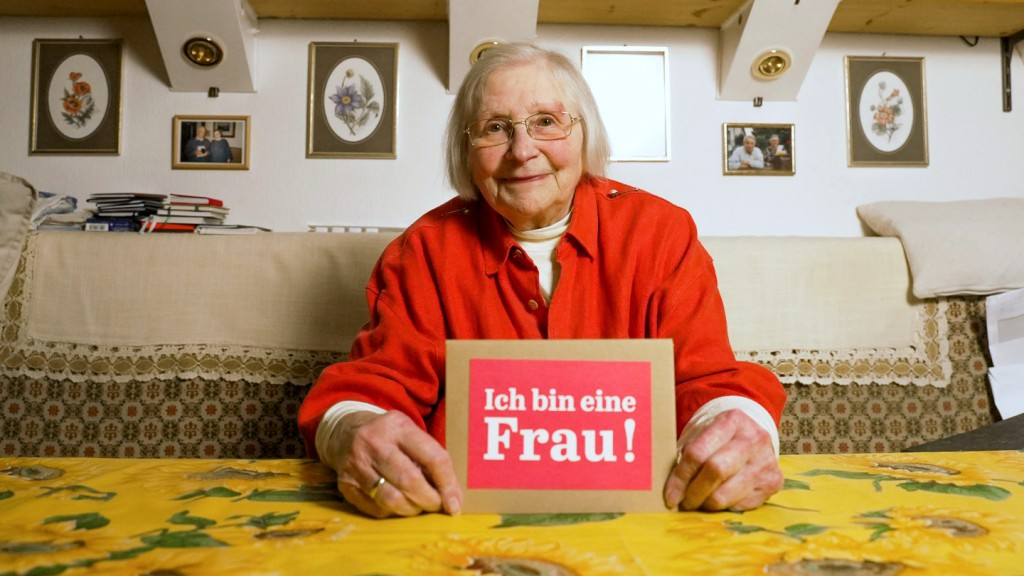
- Born: 28 December 1937; Illingen, Gau Saar-Palatinate, Germany
- Died: 4 February 2026 (aged 88)
- Occupation: Politician

Marlies Krämer (28 December 1937 – 4 February 2026) was a German feminist and politician. In 1996 she was a force in initiating the renaming of low-pressure areas in Germany, from formerly female names to a new naming system. Since 1998 these have been given female names one year and the following year male names are used instead.

== Life and career ==
After World War II she started an apprenticeship in retailing. In 1958 she married. She gave birth to four children. Her husband died in 1972. From 1987 until 1994 she became a member of the city council of Sulzbach. In the 1990s when her ID Card needed to be extended she was not willing to accept this identity document, which addressed her as Inhaber (in German a male title indicating the holder of the card) instead of Inhaberin (the female form of the title).

In 2018 she went to court (Federal Court of Justice or BGH) with the savings bank Sparkasse over how to address a bank account holder properly. Krämer shared the opinion that she does not want to be addressed as a Kunde, because it is a form of address that is not suitable for a female customer. The German language differentiates between a male variant of customer with Kunde and a female one, Kundin. The court rejected her claim and she lost the case. The ruling (Accession number: VI ZR 143/17) stated, the current practice is not gender discrimination.

On 8 March 2020 Krämer received the Women's Award of the state Rhineland Palatinate in Mainz.

Krämer died on 5 February 2026, at the age of 88.

== Published works ==
- Wenn politische Frauen kuren ... : Erfahrungen und Tips von A bis Z (1992), with Dolly Hüther. Logos-Verlag (Publisher) ISBN 978-3-928598-45-3
- Supermarkt Frühlingswiese: Eine Umweltgeschichte (2001). Conte-Verlag (Publisher) ISBN 978-3-9808118-1-1
- Wirbel im Blätterwald : gesammelte Wortmeldungen (2003). Conte-Verlag (Publisher) ISBN 978-3-936950-02-1
