= Marian Jeż =

Polish politician (1941–2026)

Member of the Sejm
- In office 18 June 1989 – 25 November 1991

Personal details
- Born: 1 June 1941 Drobnice, General Government
- Died: 5 February 2026 (aged 84)
- Party: PKLD
- Education: Wrocław University of Agriculture
- Occupation: Engineer

Marian Jeż (1 June 1941 – 5 February 2026) was a Polish politician. A member of the Parlamentarny Klub Lewicy Demokratyczne, he served in the Sejm from 1989 to 1991.

Jeż died on 5 February 2026, at the age of 84.
