= Zhani Ziçishti =

Albanian actor (1940–2026)

Zhani Ziçishti (31 May 1940 – 25 February 2026) was an Albanian actor of stage, film and television.

== Life and career ==
Zhani Ziçishti was born in Korçë on 31 May 1940. In 1964, he graduated from the Faculty of Performing Arts at the Institute of Arts in Tirana. After graduating, he performed for thirty years on the stage of the Andon Zako Çajupi Theatre in Korçë. He then emigrated to Greece.

Ziçishti died on 25 February 2026, at the age of 85.

== Filmography ==
- Lumë drite (1975)
- Beni ecën vetë (1975)
- Përballimi (1976)
- Fije që priten (1976)
- Monumenti (1977)
- Flamur në dallgë (1977)
- Vajzat me kordele të kuqe (1978)
- Nga mesi i errësirës (1978)
- Mysafiri (1979)
- Dëshmorët e monumenteve (1980)
- Kur xhirohej një film (1981)
- Agimet e stinës së madhe (1981)
- Asgjë nuk harrohet (1985)
- Një jetë më shumë (1986)
- Tre ditë nga një jetë (1986)
- Dhe vjen një ditë (1986)
- Përsëri pranverë (1987)
- Rikonstruksioni (1988)
- Kronikë e një nate (1990)
