= Uncle Joe Benson =

American radio DJ (1949/1950–2026)

"Uncle Joe" Benson (1949 or 1950 – February 24, 2026) was an American rock radio DJ. He died due to complications from Parkinson's disease, dementia and a fall on February 24, 2026, at the age of 76.
