= Pierre Merlin (geographer) =

French geographer and academic (1937–2026)

- Born: 6 May 1937; Metz, France
- Died: 3 February 2026 (aged 88)
- Education: Prytanée national militaire Paris Institute of Statistics; École polytechnique University of Paris
- Occupations: Geographer, academic

Pierre Merlin (French pronunciation: [pjɛʁ mɛʁlɛ̃]; 6 May 1937 – 3 February 2026) was a French geographer and academic.

== Life and career ==
Merlin studied at the Prytanée national militaire, the Paris Institute of Statistics, and the École polytechnique before earning his doctorate from the University of Paris in 1963 with a thesis titled La dépopulation des plateaux de la Moyenne Durance : Valensole, Forcalquier, Saint-Christol. He earned a Doctorat d’Etat in 1966 with a thesis titled Les transports parisiens : étude de géographie économique et sociale.

In 1976, he was elected president of Paris 8 University. In 1977, political turmoil erupted on campus and he was briefly held captive.

Merlin died on 3 February 2026, at the age of 88.

== Publications ==
- La Topographie (1964)
- Les Transports parisiens (1967)
- Les villes nouvelles. Urbanisme régional et aménagement (1969)
- L'exode rural (1971)
- Méthodes quantitatives et espace urbain (1973)
- Guide des raids à skis (1980)
- L'université assassinée. Vincennes : 1968-1980 (1980)
- Aménager la France des vacances (1982)
- Pour une véritable priorité au logement social à Paris (1983)
- La Planification des transports urbains (1984)
- Géographie de l'aménagement (1988)
- Transformation de la famille et habitat (1988)
- Dictionnaire de l'urbanisme et de l'aménagement (1988)
- L'urbanisme (1991)
- Géographie, économie et planification des transports (1991)
- Pour la qualité de l'université française (1994)
- Les Techniques de l’urbanisme (1995)
- Énergie, environnement et urbanisme durable (1996)
- Géographie humaine (1997)
- L'Île-de-France: hier, aujourd'hui (1999)
- L’Aménagement du territoire (2002)
- Le Transport aérien (2002)
- Le Tourisme en France (2006)
- L’Éco-région d’Île-de-France, une utopie constructive (2007)
- L'exode urbain, de la ville à la campagne (2009)
- Les grands ensembles (2010)
- Transports et urbanisme en Ïle-de-France (2012)
- Dictionnaire de l'urbanisme, de l'aménagement, du logement et de l'environnement (2023)

== Honors and Awards ==
- Knight of the Order of Legion of Honour (1990)
- Officer of the Order of Legion of Honour (2000)
