= Lélio Souza =

Brazilian politician (1937–2026)

Member of the Brazilian Constituent Assembly
- In office 1 February 1987 – 22 July 1988

Member of the Chamber of Deputies of Brazil
- In office 1 February 1983 – 31 January 1991

Member of the Legislative Assembly of Rio Grande do Sul
- In office 1 February 1971 – 31 January 1983

Personal details
- Born: Lélio Miguel Antunes de Souza; 29 September 1937 Rosário do Sul, Rio Grande do Sul, Brazil
- Died: 16 February 2026 (aged 88) Pelotas, Rio Grande do Sul, Brazil
- Party: PMDB

Lélio Miguel Antunes de Souza (29 September 1937 – 16 February 2026) was a Brazilian politician. A member of the Brazilian Democratic Movement Party, he served in the Legislative Assembly of Rio Grande do Sul from 1971 to 1983, the Chamber of Deputies from 1983 to 1991 and the Constituent Assembly from 1987 to 1988.

Souza died in Pelotas on 16 February 2026, at the age of 88.
