= Lidia Erokhina =

Russian economist (1955–2026)

Lidia Ivanovna Erokhina (Russian: Лидия Ивановна Ерохина; 13 December 1955 – 25 February 2026) was a Russian economist.

== Life and career ==
Erokhina was born on 13 December 1955 in the Penza Oblast, and was a member of the Komsomol.

In 1978, Erokhina graduated with honors from the Moscow Institute of Technology with a degree in "engineer-economist". After graduating from postgraduate studies on the distribution of the district committee of the Komsomol, she was sent to the Togliatti branch of the institute, where, since 1982, she worked alternately as an assistant, teacher, head of the department, vice-rector for academic work. In 1995, she became the rector of the institute (now it was the Volga Technological Institute of Service).

In 2009, in the elections to the City Duma, Togliatti, Erokhina ran as the third number one in the party list of the United Russia party, acting as a "political locomotive". Immediately after the election, she refused the deputy mandate.

Erokhina died on 25 February 2026, at the age of 70.
