= Morishige Naruse =

Japanese politician (1933–2026)

- 成瀬守重

Member of the House of Councillors
- In office 23 July 1989 – 22 July 2001
- Constituency: Proportional representation block

Personal details
- Born: 6 February 1933 Okazaki, Japan
- Died: 4 February 2026 (aged 92) Okazaki, Japan
- Party: LDP
- Education: Waseda University
- Occupation: Business executive

Morishige Naruse (Japanese: 成瀬守重 Naruse Morishige; 6 February 1933 – 4 February 2026) was a Japanese politician. A member of the Liberal Democratic Party, he served in the House of Councillors from 1989 to 2001.

Naruse died in Okazaki on 4 February 2026, two days shy of his 93rd birthday.
