= Rodolfo Díaz (politician) =

Argentine politician (1943–2026)

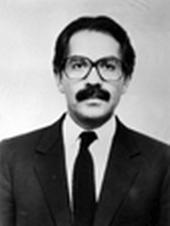
- Díaz in 1992

Minister of Labour and Social Security
- In office 16 January 1992 – 4 December 1992
- Preceded by: Jorge Triaca Sr.
- Succeeded by: Enrique Osvaldo Rodríguez

Personal details
- Born: Rodolfo Alejandro Díaz; 30 May 1943 Mendoza, Argentina
- Died: 20 February 2026 (aged 82) Buenos Aires, Argentina
- Party: PJ
- Education: University of Buenos Aires
- Occupation: Lawyer

Rodolfo Alejandro Díaz (30 May 1943 – 20 February 2026) was an Argentine politician. A member of the Justicialist Party, he served as Minister of Labour and Social Security from January to December 1992.

Díaz died in Buenos Aires on 20 February 2026, at the age of 82.
