= Marc Bloch University =

Former French university in Strasbourg

Coordinates: 48.5795°N 7.7641°E

The University Marc Bloch, also known as Strasbourg II or UMB, was a university in Strasbourg, Alsace, France. As of 2006, it had around 13,000 students. Its name used to be Université des Sciences Humaines (University of Social Sciences), but it was renamed in 1998 in honour of the French historian Marc Bloch. It retained its focus on humanities subjects and the social sciences. On 1 January 2009, Marc Bloch University became part of the refounded University of Strasbourg and lost its status as an independent university.
