= 2026 in Canada =

- Decades: 2000s; 2010s; 2020s
- See also: History of Canada; Timeline of Canadian history; List of years in Canada

The following is a list of events of the year 2026 in Canada, as well as events that are scheduled or predicted to take place during the year.

== Incumbents ==
=== The Crown ===
- Monarch – Charles III

=== Federal government ===
- Governor General – Mary Simon (until June 8); then Louise Arbour
- Prime Minister – Mark Carney
- Parliament – 45th

=== Provincial governments ===
==== Lieutenant Governors ====
- Lieutenant Governor of Alberta – Salma Lakhani
- Lieutenant Governor of British Columbia – Wendy Lisogar-Cocchia
- Lieutenant Governor of Manitoba – Anita Neville
- Lieutenant Governor of New Brunswick – Louise Imbeault
- Lieutenant Governor of Newfoundland and Labrador – Joan Marie Aylward
- Lieutenant Governor of Nova Scotia – Mike Savage
- Lieutenant Governor of Ontario – Edith Dumont
- Lieutenant Governor of Prince Edward Island – Wassim Salamoun
- Lieutenant Governor of Quebec – Manon Jeannotte
- Lieutenant Governor of Saskatchewan – Bernadette McIntyre

==== Premiers ====
- Premier of Alberta – Danielle Smith
- Premier of British Columbia – David Eby (until November 20); then Lorne Doerkson
- Premier of Manitoba – Wab Kinew
- Premier of New Brunswick – Susan Holt
- Premier of Newfoundland and Labrador – Tony Wakeham
- Premier of Nova Scotia – Tim Houston
- Premier of Ontario – Doug Ford
- Premier of Prince Edward Island – Bloyce Thompson (until February 9); then Rob Lantz
- Premier of Quebec –
  - François Legault (until April 15)
  - Christine Fréchette (April 15 to October 21)
  - then Paul St-Pierre Plamondon
- Premier of Saskatchewan – Scott Moe

=== Territorial governments ===
==== Commissioners ====
- Commissioner of Northwest Territories – Gerald W. Kisoun
- Commissioner of Nunavut – Eva Aariak (until ?); then Lew Philip (acting)
- Commissioner of Yukon – Adeline Webber

==== Premiers ====
- Premier of Northwest Territories – R.J. Simpson
- Premier of Nunavut – John Main
- Premier of Yukon – Currie Dixon

== Events ==
=== January ===
- January 1 – The Canadian Grocery Code of Conduct enters into effect.
- January 4 – The Canada Revenue Agency says it is owed more than $10 billion CAD in COVID-19 benefits and had disbursed $83.5 billion in COVID benefits to Canadians as of November 30, 2025, and had been repaid more than $4 billion.
- January 5
  - Ukrainian president Volodymyr Zelenskyy appoints former deputy prime minister and incumbent federal MP Chrystia Freeland as an economic development adviser, with Freeland announcing that she would resign as the Member of Parliament (MP) for University—Rosedale in the coming weeks.
  - 2026 World Junior Ice Hockey Championships: Canada defeats Finland 6-3, winning the bronze medal.
  - Premier of Ontario Doug Ford announces that the Liquor Control Board of Ontario will cease sales of Crown Royal in February 2026, advising people to "stock up".
  - A Ontario court rules that Premier Ford must release his personal cell phone logs.
- January 5–6 – Carney travels to Paris, France to participate in peace negotiations with members of the coalition of the willing regarding the 2022 Russian invasion of Ukraine and meets with NATO secretary general Mark Rutte and Danish prime minister Mette Frederiksen.
- January 7 – Ubisoft closes Ubisoft Halifax, impacting 71 positions.
- January 9 – Chrystia Freeland resigns her seat as MP for University—Rosedale.
- January 11 – Team Canada unveils the 2026 Olympic figure skating team.
- January 12 – A new Urgent Care Centre opens in St. John's, Newfoundland and Labrador.
- January 12–17 – Carney travels to China to meet with president Xi Jinping, premier Li Qiang and other government leaders for the first visit to China by a sitting Prime Minister since 2017.
- January 13 – Statistics Canada announces 850 job cuts, with over 100 to happen in the following days.
- January 14 – François Legault announces his pending resignation as Premier of Québec and leader of the Coalition Avenir Québec, triggering a leadership election.
- January 15
  - A Canadian citizen dies in Iran amid protests according to Global Affairs.
  - Former Ubisoft Halifax workers reveal the company had since 2017 received over 977$ million CAD in tax breaks from the NS government, on the same day workers filed a complaint and the Government of Nova Scotia says it is "deeply concerned".
- January 16 – Canada reaches a trade deal with China that eliminates or lowers Chinese tariffs on canola and other products, with Canada allowing the import of a limited quantity of Chinese-made electric vehicles into the country.
- January 17 – A protest organized by Aaju Peter occurs in Iqaluit in solidarity with the protests occurring in Denmark and Greenland.
- January 18 – Carney travels to Qatar to meet with emir Tamim bin Hamad Al Thani.
- January 19–21 – Carney attends the annual meeting of the World Economic Forum in Davos, Switzerland, giving a speech and meeting with government and business leaders.
- January 22 – Alleged drug lord Ryan Wedding is arrested in Mexico after being on the FBI Ten Most Wanted Fugitives since 2025.
- January 23: The Coalition Avenir Québec government of Quebec announces its removing the British crown from province’s coat of arms.
- January 24 – U.S. President Donald Trump threatens 100% tariffs on Canada over the country’s potential deal with China.
- January 26 – Carney announces a suite of affordability measures, including a revamp to the GST/HST credit by renaming it the Canada Groceries and Essentials Benefit, boosting it by 25 per cent for a period of five years, and providing an additional one-time top-up payment equivalent to 50 per cent of the 2025-26 total amount. Additionally announced were measures targeting Canada's food security, such as a $500 million allotment from the "Strategic Response Fund" to businesses along with various other measures.
- January 27
  - The State Council of South Korea approves the sharing of military intelligence with Canada.
  - Canada reaches an agreement with India to expand the export of oil and gas to the country.
- January 28
  - South Korea and Canada sign a memorandum of understanding (MoU) regarding the auto sector, intended to bring the manufacturing of South Korean vehicles to Canada as well as to encourage South Korean investment in the country.
  - Two people are killed in a shooting at the Cree Nation of Mistissini in Québec.
- January 29 – Trump threatens to impose a 50% tariff on Canadian-made aircraft such as those manufactured by Québécois company Bombardier Inc. subsidiary Bombardier Aviation as well as to have the Federal Aviation Administration decertify said aircraft, based on the alleged lack of certification by Transport Canada of certain aircraft manufactured by American aircraft company Gulfstream Aerospace.
- January 29–31 – Conservative Party of Canada leader Pierre Poilievre undergoes a leadership review at the 2026 Conservative convention in Calgary to determine whether he has the support of party members to continue leading the party following its defeat in the 2025 Canadian federal election, earning 87.4% support from delegates.

=== February ===
- February 2 – Bill Blair resigns his seat as MP for Scarborough Southwest due to his appointment to the role of High Commissioner to the United Kingdom by Carney.
- February 5
  - Carney announces a new strategy for Canada's automotive sector, eliminating the Electric Vehicle Availability Standards (EVAS) system implemented under the previous government led by former Prime Minister Justin Trudeau and re-introducing sale rebates for electric vehicles (EVs) priced under $50,000 that are sold in Canada, alongside $3 billion being allocated from the Strategic Response Fund to help the sector withstand the various impacts suffered as a result of the tariffs enacted in the second Trump administration.
  - Authorities announce the arrest of eight serving and retired members of the Toronto Police Service as part of an organized crime investigation involving bribery, conspiracy to commit murder and drug trafficking.
  - 2026 Winter Olympics: The Canadian women's hockey team postpones a game with Finland due to an outbreak of norovirus.
- February 6 – Greenland crisis: Canada announces that it will open a consulate in Greenland to reinforce support for Denmark against US president Donald Trump's threats to annex the territory.
- February 7
  - The 2026 New Democratic Party of Prince Edward Island leadership election is held.
  - The 2026 Progressive Conservative Party of Prince Edward Island leadership election is held.
- February 9 – Air Canada suspends flights to Cuba over a shortage of jet fuel.
- February 10
  - Canada approves the first oral self test for HIV.
  - Trump threatens the opening of the Gordie Howe International Bridge, and remarks that the US should be "fully compensated for everything" it has given to its northern neighbour, and that Ottawa "treats the United States with the Fairness and Respect that we deserve".
  - WestJet suspends flights from Winnipeg to Atlanta and Nashville, Tennessee, citing drop in demand.
  - Nine people are killed in a shooting in Tumbler Ridge, British Columbia.
- February 11 – Airlines Air Transat and WestJet suspend flights to Cuba due to the fuel shortage.
- February 13 – After no other candidates qualified, Charles Milliard is acclaimed as leader of the Québec Liberal Party following its leadership election.
- February 15 – 2026 Winter Olympics: Team Canada faces cheating allegations from Team Sweden's curling team.
- February 17 – China grants visa-free entry for 30 days to citizens of Canada.
- February 18 – Edmonton Riverbend MP Matt Jeneroux defects from the Conservative Party to the Liberal Party.
- February 19 – Alberta Premier Danielle Smith announces the 2026 Alberta referendum is scheduled for October 19, 2026.
- February 20 – US tariffs on Canada are found unlawful by Supreme Court of the United States
- February 23 – The 2026 Chicoutimi provincial by-election is held.
- February 27–March 8 – 2026 Montana's Brier is held in St. John's, Newfoundland and Labrador.

=== March ===
- March 2
  - Canada and India sign multiple deals in multiple areas and sectors, totaling $5.5 billion CAD, with a goal to sign a more comprehensive trade deal by December.
  - Ottawa issues travel advisories for 13 nations in the Middle East due to the 2026 Iran war.
- March 3–4 – Carney travels to Australia, where he addresses the Parliament of Australia and meets with Prime Minister Anthony Albanese.
- March 6
  - Japan and Canada sign a strategic agreement to enhance cooperation in the defense, economy and energy sectors.
  - Carney endorses the removal of Andrew Mountbatten-Windsor from the royal line of succession over his involvement in the Epstein scandal.
- March 8
  - Carney calls by-elections scheduled for April 13 in the ridings of Scarborough Southwest, University-Rosedale and Terrebonne.
  - Canada wins its first gold medal at the 2026 Winter Paralympics.
- March 10 – Two gunmen open fire at the US consulate in Toronto. No injuries are reported. Prime Minister Mark Carney condemns the shooting.
- March 11 – Nunavut MP Lori Idlout defects from the New Democratic Party to the Liberal Party.
- March 12
  - Carney announces a CA$35 billion investment plan for defence and infrastructure in the Northern Canada region.
  - The Canadian Radio-television and Telecommunications Commission announces the elimination of fees when consumers cancel, activate, or upgrade a cellular service plan, scheduled to take effect on 12 June 2026.
- March 13 – The US expands trade-related investigations, including a trade probe, into Canada in addition to 59 other countries.
- March 17 – Doug Armstrong announces he is stepping down as general manager of the Canada men's national ice hockey team
- March 22 – Two people are killed and 41 are injured after an Air Canada jet flying from Montreal collides with a fire truck at LaGuardia Airport in New York City.
- March 26 – The National Assembly of Québec passes a motion for Michael Rousseau, the CEO of Air Canada, to resign for his unilingual response to the crash of Air Canada Express Flight 8646. All parties vote in favour of the motion.
- March 27 – Sony announces a price increase of 200$CAD of the base PlayStation 5 console and PS5 Pro and PlayStation Portal to go in effect in April
- March 29 – Avi Lewis is elected as leader of the New Democratic Party.
- March 30
  - Prince Edward Island reduces the screening for colorectal cancer from 50 to 45, becoming the first province to do so.
  - Michael Rousseau, the CEO of Air Canada, resigns.

=== April ===
- April 2 – The National Assembly of Québec passes government Bill 9, expanding on its secularism law Bill 21 and barring wearing religious symbols for daycare workers and prayer spaces in public institutions. The Coalition Avenir Québec (CAQ) and Parti Québécois vote in favour of the legislation, while the Liberals and Québec Solidaire vote against it.
- April 8 – Sarnia—Lambton—Bkejwanong MP Marilyn Gladu defects from the Conservative Party to the Liberal Party.
- April 12 – Christine Fréchette is elected as leader of the CAQ.
- April 13 – By-elections are held in Scarborough Southwest, University-Rosedale and Terrebonne, with the Liberal Party winning all three contests and resulting in the first majority Liberal government since the 2015 Canadian federal election.
- April 14 – Carney orders the suspension of the federal fuel excise tax in response to the 2026 Iran war from 20 April to 7 September.
- April 15 – Christine Frechette is appointed Premier of Québec, following Legualt's resignation.
- April 27 – Carney announces the creation of Canada's first sovereign wealth fund, the Canada Strong Fund, with an initial endowment of $25 billion over a three-year period.

=== May ===
- May 5
  - Carney announces the appointment of retired Supreme Court justice Louise Arbour as the next Governor General of Canada.
  - A suspected financial operative of the Sinaloa Cartel is arrested in Montréal.
- May 11 – 2026 New Brunswick municipal elections
- May 12 – The 2026 Canadian census takes place.
- May 13 – A court in Edmonton orders a suspension of verification of signatures for a citizen-led petition to hold a referendum on Albertan independence by Stay Free Alberta, citing a failure to consult with First Nations communities.
- May 21 – Alberta Premier Danielle Smith announces a tenth referendum question, on whether the province should remain within Canada or pursue a path toward a binding referendum on separating from Canada.
- May 26 – The government imposes a mandatory 21-day self-isolation for travelers arriving from Uganda, Congo-Kinshasa, and Sudan-Juba, and suspends visa applications from those countries amid the 2026 Central Africa Ebola epidemic effective from the next day until 29 August.
- May 30 – 2026 Conservative Party of British Columbia leadership election

=== June ===
- June 5 – The Canadian Food Inspection Agency suspends the importation of cattle from Texas following an infestation of New World screwworm.
- June 8 – Louise Arbour is inaugurated as governor general of Canada.
- June 10 – Ubisoft closes its Winnipeg studio, affecting 65 employees,
- June 11
  - A Toronto Police Service officer is killed during a shoot-out that erupts during a raid as part of investigations into the shooting incident at the US consulate in Toronto in March.
  - The Quebec Coalition Avenir Québec (CAQ) government abandons its Constitution of Québec bill due to opposition from the Liberal Party and Québec Solidaire.
  - The National Assembly of Québec passes (103-1), the CAQ government Bill that bans the sale of energy drinks to people under 16. Québec becomes the first Canadian province to do this.
- June 11 – July 19 – 2026 FIFA World Cup
- June 12 – The 2026 FIFA World Cup officially kicks off at BMO Field in Toronto, with the Canada men's national soccer team tying Bosnia and Herzegovina. Seoul-Korean singer Rain, Canadian singers Alanis Morissette and Michael Bublé perform at the opening ceremony.
- June 18 – Canada wins their first ever FIFA World Cup game with a 6-0 win against Qatar at BC Place in Vancouver as Jonathan David scores a hat trick.
- June 19 – A court in Toronto convicts Magna International founder Frank Stronach of sexual assault and indecent assault for incidents that happened between the 1970s and 1990s.
- June 22
  - Three people, including the gunman, are killed in a shooting in Montréal.
  - Canada and Australia sign a $1.75 billion export agreement for the construction of an Australian-designed long-range radar system in Canada as part of an early warning network.
- June 24 – 2026 Canadian wildfires: An Rockwell Aero Commander 690 operated by Buffalo Airways crashes during firefighting operations 50 kilometres (31 mi) from Fort Simpson, Northwest Territories, killing the pilot and two firefighters.
- June 28 – Canada defeats South Africa 1-0 with a last minute goal by Stephen Eustáquio to advance to the round of 16 in the 2026 FIFA World Cup.

=== July ===
- July 1:
  - Ontario reduces the eligibility age for colorectal cancer screenings from 50 to 45, becoming the second province in Canada to do so after Prince Edward Island.
  - The European Broadcasting Union and CBC announce that Canada will participate in the Eurovision Song Contest for the first time in 2027.
- July 2 – The Philippines and Canada upgrade their bilateral relations to a strategic partnership.
- July 11 – Two people are killed while six others are wounded in a mass shooting at the Salsa on St. Clair festival in Toronto.
- July 13 – The Namaygoosisagagun First Nation community in Ontario is destroyed by a wildfire.
- July 17 – The Court of Appeal for Ontario finds far-right activist and Freedom Convoy organizer Pat King "guilty of intimidation" and orders a re-sentencing.
- July 24 – The United States imposes a 10% tariff on Canada, citing the presence of alleged forced labour in the supply chain.
- July 27 – A gun is fired at the US consulate in Toronto. No injuries are reported.

=== August ===
- August 4 – 2026 Canadian wildfires: The Bradley Creek fire destroys 250 homes belonging to the Okanagan Indian Band near Vernon, British Columbia.
- August 8 – 2026 Canadian wildfires: The British Columbian government declares a state of emergency after the Bald Range fire destroyed homes and forced the evacuation of 20,000 people living along Okanagan Lake.
- August 14 – Peter Milobar leaves the BC Conservative caucus to sit as an independent.
- August 18 – Parti Québécois (PQ) leader Paul St-Pierre Plamondon announces that the PQ remains committed to holding a independence referendum during a first term in government, but it would not hold one before January 20, 2029, when US president Donald Trump is scheduled to leave office at the end of his second term.
- August 21 – Two men are injured in a stabbing at a Sikh temple in Edmonton. A man is arrested.
- August 29 – In response to U.S. President Trump renaming Lake Ontario to Lake America for U.S. federal agencies, Ontario Premier Doug Ford unveils a sign in Grimsby reading "Lake Ontario. Now and Always" in English and French.

=== September ===
- September 8 – Canada sanctions products from Israeli settlements in the West Bank.
- September 20 – A man and a police officer engage in a shootout outside a synagogue in Belleville, Ontario, leaving the man dead and the officer injured.
- September 22 – Prime Minister Carney announces that the country is providing C$100 million in international aid to Palestine.
- September 24 – October 4 – Calgary International Film Festival
- September 26 – A helicopter crash near Montréal leaves four people dead.
- September 30 – A car hits pedestrians attending a National Day for Truth and Reconciliation walk in Tsawwassen First Nation, British Columbia, killing two people and injuring another two.

=== October ===
- October 1 – For the first time since Konrad Narth became leader of the Progressive Conservative Party, Manitoba Premier Wab Kinew answers questions in French in front the members of the Manitoba Legislative Assembly.
- October 5 – The 2026 Quebec general election is held. The Parti Québécois wins a minority government, forming its first government since 2012.
- October 8 – Poet Anne Carson is awarded the Nobel Prize in Literature.
- October 15 – Two buses and multiple other vehicles collide in Calgary, Alberta, killing three people and injuring 19 others.
- October 17:
  - Four service members are killed in a fire at CFB Wainwright.
  - 2026 British Columbia municipal elections
  - The 2026 Progressive Conservative Party of New Brunswick leadership election is held. Former MLA Daniel Allain wins the leadership.
- October 19 – 2026 Alberta referendum: A majority of 76% of voters in the province reject moves to hold a referendum on secession from Canada.
- October 21 – Haitian-Canadian writer Thélyson Orélien's publisher Boreal severs its relationship with him after confirming he used AI to help write his novel It Was Either That or Die.
- October 24 – 2026 British Columbia general election is held, with the Conservative Party of British Columbia winning a majority government. It is the BC Conservatives' first general election victory in 98 years.
- October 26 – The 2026 Ontario municipal elections are held.
- October 28 – The 2026 Manitoba municipal elections are held.
- October 29 — Prime Minister Carney announces plans to invest $1.6 billion CAD into Toronto based artificial intelligence company Cohere as part of a funding round intended to expand domestic computing infrastructure and artificial intelligence development.

=== November ===
- November 2 – The 2026 Prince Edward Island municipal elections are held.
- November 2–3 – Two people are found dead following a suspected grizzly bear attack in Bella Coola, British Columbia.
- November 6 – Eight Canadian money services companies are sanctioned by the US for dealing with the Iranian regime.
- November 13
  - No Canadian systems are affected by the FAA Nationwide Ground Stop in the US. Nav Canada offers support for diverted planes during the outage.
  - Flooding in Squamish, British Columbia kills 3.
- November 14 – Prime Minister Carney announces that negotiations for a free trade agreement (FTA) with the Philippines have concluded, with signing expected in 2027. The FTA would eliminate more than 90% of tariff lines between Canada and Philippines.
- November 15 – The Edmonton Elks defeat the Montreal Alouettes to win the 113th Grey Cup in Calgary, Alberta.
- November 16 – The Governor of the Bank of Canada, Richard Macklem, announces he will step down at the end of his term in June.
- November 17 – Prime Minister Carney meets with Chinese leader Jìnpíng Xí at the APEC summit in Shēnzhèn, China.

== Scheduled events ==
=== December ===
- December 5 – 2026 Green Party of New Brunswick leadership election

== Art and entertainment ==
- List of Canadian films of 2026
- 2025–26 NHL season
- 2026 in Canadian soccer
- 2026 in Canadian music
- 2026 in Canadian television
- List of Canadian submissions for the Academy Award for Best International Feature Film

== Holidays ==
- January 1 – New Year's Day
- February 17 – Family Day
- April 3 – Good Friday
- May 18 – Victoria Day
- July 1 – Canada Day
- September 7 – Labour Day
- September 30 – National Day for Truth and Reconciliation
- October 12 – Thanksgiving Day
- November 11 – Remembrance Day
- December 25 – Christmas Day

== Deaths ==
=== January ===
- January 1 – Brian Doyle, writer (b. 1935)
- January 2 – Evan Hammond, radio show host, ice hockey broadcaster, and blogger (b. 1980 or 1981)
- January 4
  - David Branch, ice hockey administrator (b. 1948)
  - Ralph L. Thomas, Brazilian-born film director and screenwriter (b. 1939)
- January 7
  - Glenn Hall, ice hockey player (b. 1931)
  - Kim Thorson, lawyer and politician (b. 1932)
- January 8 – Jim Furlong, football player (b. 1940)
- January 12
  - Henri Dorion, geographer and academic (b. 1935)
  - John A. Pollock, businessman and chancellor of Wilfrid Laurier University (b. 1936)
- January 13
  - Jesse Flis, politician (b. 1933)
  - Jason Lafreniere, ice hockey player (b. 1966)
- January 14 – Ernestine Russell, gymnast and college gymnastics coach (b. 1938)
- January 16 – Evelyn Gigantes, politician (b. 1942)
- January 17 – Phil Goyette, ice hockey player (b. 1933)
- January 23 – Jean Dorion, politician, sociologist, and Quebec nationalist leader (b. 1942)
- January 26
  - Kirsty Duncan, politician and medical geographer (b. 1966)
  - Chuck Lefley, ice hockey player (b. 1950)
  - Ian McDougall, musician (b. 1938)
  - Len Simms, politician (b. 1943)
- January 29 – Eric Cameron, English-born artist (b. 1935)
- January 30 – Catherine O'Hara, actress, comedian, and screenwriter (b. 1954)

=== February ===
- February 2 – Jacques Tremblay, politician (b. 1942)
- February 3
  - George LeBlanc, politician and Mayor of Moncton (b. 1955)
  - Jim Morrison, ice hockey player (b. 1931)
  - Fernand Ouellette, writer (b. 1930)
- February 4 – Bill Loewen, businessman, philanthropist, and political figure (b. 1930)
- February 8
  - Hannah Henry, triathlete (b. 1999)
  - Franco Nuovo, journalist and television presenter (b. 1953)
- February 9
  - Lynton Wilson, business executive and chancellor of McMaster University (b. 1940)
  - Eldon Lautermilch, politician (b. 1949)
  - Jim Robson, radio and television broadcaster (b. 1935)
- February 13 – William C. Leggett, population biologist and university administrator (b. 1939)
- February 14 – Lowell Green, American-born radio personality, journalist, and author (b. 1936)
- February 16 – Bob Howes, football player (b. 1943)
- February 17 – Cliff Hucul, racing driver (b. 1946)
- February 19 – Bobbie Sparrow, politician (b. 1935)
- February 21
  - Raymond Bouchard, actor (b. 1945)
  - Guyle Fielder, American-born ice hockey player (b. 1930)
- February 22 – Fernand Roberge, hotelier and politician (b. 1940)
- February 25
  - Giorgio Mammoliti, politician (b. 1961)
  - Scotty Morrison, president and chairman of the Hockey Hall of Fame and ice hockey referee (b. 1930)
- February 26 – André Vanasse, writer (b. 1942)

=== March ===
- March 2
  - Andrew Gunn, film producer (b. 1969)
  - Pockets Warhol, capuchin monkey artist (b. 1992)
- March 4
  - Michael Donovan, actor (b. 1953)
- March 7 – Troy Murray, ice hockey player and broadcaster (b. 1962)
- March 9 – Allan Legere, serial killer (b. 1948)
- March 15 – James M. Houston, British-born theologian (b. 1922)
- March 17 – Mark McLane, politician (b. 1970)
- March 20 – Rodger Brulotte, broadcaster (b. 1947)
- March 21 – Amanda Lathlin, politician (b. 1976)
- March 24
  - Biruté Galdikas, German-born anthropologist, primatologist, conservationist, ethologist, and author (b. 1946)
  - Larry Kennedy, politician (b. 1949)
- March 27
  - Rose Kingdon, broadcaster (b. 1961)
  - Michael Sather, politician (b. 1947 or 1948)
- March 29 – Bill Riley, ice hockey player (b. 1950)
- March 31 – Stephen Lewis, politician, public speaker, broadcaster, diplomat, and leader of the Ontario New Democratic Party (b. 1937)

=== April ===
- April 1
  - Dick Roberge, ice hockey player and coach (b. 1934)
  - Louis Saia, filmmaker (b. 1950)
- April 2 – Ronald Eddy, politician and Mayor of the County of Brant (b. 1931)
- April 4 – Arne Olsen, screenwriter (b. 1961 or 1962)
- April 5 – David Wiffen, singer-songwriter (b. 1942)
- April 10
  - Dinah Christie, English-born actress and singer (b. 1942)
  - Sid Krofft, puppeteer and television writer (b. 1929)
  - Gabor Szilasi, Hungarian-born photographer (b. 1928)
- April 13 – Donald K. Tarlton, record producer and promoter (b. 1943)
- April 23 – Will Stanhope, rock climber (b. 1986)
- April 24 – Benoît Rousseau, actor (b. 1959)
- April 27
  - Matt Davidson, ice hockey player (b. 1977)
  - John Garrett, ice hockey player and commentator (b. 1951)
- April 28 – Dan McLean, journalist and news anchor (b. 1947)

=== May ===
- May 4 – Pat Graham, ice hockey player (b. 1961)
- May 5 – Trevor Bennett, politician (b. 1926)
- May 8 – Punch McLean, ice hockey player and coach (b. 1932)
- May 10
  - John Barbour, actor, comedian, documentarian, and television host (b. 1933)
  - J. J. Barrie, musician and comedian (b. 1933)
- May 15 – Cris Derksen, Cree cellist and composer (b. 1981)
- May 19 – Robert Irving, conglomerate industry and ice hockey executive (b. 1954)
- May 21 – Dan Newman, politician (b. 1963)
- May 23 – Howard Moscoe, politician (b. 1939)
- May 26 – Forbes Kennedy, ice hockey player (b. 1935)
- May 28 – Claude Lemieux, ice hockey player (b. 1965)
- May 29 – James R. Gibson, historian and geographer (b. 1935)

=== June ===
- June 1
  - Stéphane-Albert Boulais, writer and film critic (b. 1949)
  - Margaret Commodore, politician (b. 1932)
- June 5 – Cliff Fletcher, NHL executive (b. 1935)
- June 9 – Sophie Faucher, actress (b. 1958)
- June 10 – David Cayley, writer and broadcaster (b. 1946)
- June 14 – Alvin Libin, businessman and sports executive (b. 1931)
- June 15 – Kyle Calder, ice hockey player (b. 1979)
- June 17 – Marilyn Trenholme Counsell, lecturer, doctor, and politician (b. 1933)
- June 25 – Gail Bowen, playwright, writer, and educator (b. 1942)
- June 27 – Valery Fabrikant, academic and convicted mass murderer (b. 1940)
- June 28 – Tom Siddon, aerospace engineer and politician (b. 1941)

=== July ===
- July 3 – Tommy Hunter, entertainer (b. 1937)
- July 5 – Renata Ford, political candidate (b. 1971)
- July 7 – Marc Messier, actor and writer (b. 1947)
- July 13 – John Hamm, physician, politician, and premier of Nova Scotia (b. 1938)
- July 18 – Jayden Dalke, football player (b. 1996)
- July 20 – Eddie Joyal, ice hockey player (b. 1940)
- July 22 – Oliver Jones, jazz pianist, organist, composer, and arranger (b. 1934)
- July 29 – Scott Hylands, actor (b. 1943)
- July 31 – Todd Lewis, politician (b. 1961)

=== August ===
- August 1 – Lou Sekora, politician (b. 1931)
- August 2 – Dusty LaValley, bareback rider (b. 1981)
- August 4 – Lloyd Robertson, journalist and news anchor (b. 1934)
- August 5 – Tedde Moore, actress, script editor, creative consultant, and acting instructor (b. 1947)
- August 13
  - Peter Maher, sportscaster (b. 1946)
  - Brendan Myers, philosopher and author (b. 1974)
  - Dick Proctor, journalist, businessman, and politician (b. 1941)
- August 20 – Perry Rosemond, television writer, producer, and director (b. 1936)
- August 22 – barbara findlay, LGBT rights activist and lawyer (b. 1949)
- August 23 – René Malo, film producer (b. 1942)
- August 24 – Gene Flasch, 94, politician, Saskatchewan MLA (1971–1975) (b, 1931).
- August 26 – Peter Cullen, voice actor (b. 1941)
- August 28 – Joan Phillip, politician, British Columbia MLA (2023–2026) (b. 1952)

=== September ===
- September 1 – Annette Saint-Pierre, educator, writer, and publisher (b. 1925)
- September 3 – Ritu Khullar, jurist, chief justice of Alberta (b. 1964)
- September 5
  - Georgina Lightning, film director, screenwriter, and actress (b. 1963)
  - Otto Jelinek, figure skater and politician (b. 1940)
- September 6 – Allen Engel, politician and farmer (b. 1932)
- September 8 – André Pronovost, ice hockey player (b. 1936)
- September 12
  - George Chuvalo, boxer (b. 1937)
  - Cal Nichols, businessman (b. 1942)
- September 14
  - Louis Caron, journalist and writer (b. 1942)
  - K. D. Miller, novelist and short story writer (b. 1951)
- September 15
  - Andy Donato, editorial cartoonist, newspaper art director, and painter (b. 1937)
  - Pye Dubois, lyricist and poet (b. 1948)
- September 17
  - Ron Hurst, ice hockey player (b. 1931)
  - Gary McCracken, musician (b. 1951)
- September 19 – Wes MacAleer, politician (b. 1944)
- September 25 – David Marsden, radio broadcaster and program director (b. 1941)
- September 28 – Anne Claire Poirier, film director and producer (b. 1932)

=== October ===
- October 2
  - Sass Jordan, rock singer (b. 1962)
  - Denys Tremblay, artist and micronational leader (b. 1951)
- October 3 – Lyle Odelein, ice hockey player (b. 1968)
- October 6 – Myles O'Connor, ice hockey player (b. 1967)
- October 8
  - Stephen A. Jarislowsky, German-born investor and philanthropist (b. 1925)
  - Salah Bachir, Lebanese-born film industry executive and academic administrator (b. 1955)
- October 9 – Bobby Gould, ice hockey player (b. 1957)
- October 11 – Jean-Luc Mongrain, journalist, television host, and news anchor (b. 1951)
- October 12
  - Gerry Kowalsky, centenarian automobile salesman (b. 1922)
  - Irene Mathyssen, politician (b. 1951)
- October 13
  - John Angus, businessman and politician (b. 1943)
  - Helen Branswell, infectious diseases and global health reporter (b. 1957)
- October 17 – Michèle Magny, actress, playwright, and theatre director (b. 1944)
- October 22 – Ron Duguay, ice hockey player and coach (b. 1957)
- October 25 – Eric Bauza, voice actor (b. 1979)
- October 28 – Brian Smith, ice hockey player (b. 1937)
- October 30 – Matt Pavelich, ice hockey linesman (b. 1934)

=== November ===
- November 2 – Jeannot Gilbert, ice hockey player (b. 1940)
- November 6 – Dawn Greenhalgh, Chinese-born actress (b. 1933)
- November 9 – Brian Ahern, record producer and guitarist (b. 1945)
- November 11
  - Clifford Huskilson, politician (b. 1953)
  - Michael John Roberts, television director, producer, and animator (b. 1977)
