= 2026 in Quebec =

- Decades: 2000s; 2010s; 2020s
- See also: History of Canada; Timeline of Canadian history; List of years in Canada

The following is a list of events of the year 2026 in Quebec, as well as events that are scheduled or predicted to take place during the year.

== Incumbents ==
- 43rd Quebec Legislature
- Premier of Quebec:
  - François Legault (until April 15)
  - Christine Fréchette (until October 21)
  - Paul St-Pierre Plamondon

== Events ==
=== January ===
- January 6: Charles Milliard announces his candidacy for the leadership of the Quebec Liberal Party.
- January 9: Following his arrest for impaired driving, Dubuc MNA François Tremblay withdraws from the Coalition Avenir Québec caucus.
- January 14: Francois Legault announces his resignation as Premier of Quebec and leader of the Coalition Avenir Québec, triggering a leadership election.
- January 18: The Minister Geneviève Guilbault announces that she will not be running in the fall election.
- January 23:
  - Simon Jolin-Barrette declines to run in the 2026 Coalition Avenir Québec leadership election despite receiving caucus endorsements.
  - The CAQ government of Quebec announces its removing the British crown from province’s coat of arms.
- January 19: The Minister Sonia LeBel announces that she will not be running for re-election.
- January 24: Bernard Drainville announces his candidacy for the leadership of the Coalition Avenir Québec.
- January 25: Christine Fréchette also announces her candidacy for the leadership of the Coalition Avenir Québec.
- January 26: Benoit Charette returns as Minister of the Environment. Jean Boulet becomes Minister of the Economy. They replace Bernard Drainville and Christine Fréchette, who have entered the leadership race.
- January 28: Doug Ford, Premier of Ontario, declares that a Parti Québécois victory in the next election would be a "disaster" for Canada.

=== February ===
- February 13: Charles Milliard was acclaimed as party leader of the Liberal party on as no other candidates qualified on the ballot.
- February 23: The 2026 Chicoutimi provincial by-election is held. Parti Québécois wins the election.

=== March ===
- March 26: The National Assembly in Quebec passes a motion for Michael Rousseau the CEO of Air Canada to resign for his unilingual response to the Air Canada Express Flight 8646. All parties voted in favour of the motion.
- March 30: Michael Rousseau the CEO of Air Canada resigns.

=== April ===
- April 2 – The National Assembly in Quebec passes the Coalition Avenir Québec (CAQ) government Bill 9 that expands on its secularism law Bill 21. It bans wearing religious symbols for daycare workers and prayer spaces in public institutions. CAQ and Parti Québécois, voted in favour of the legislation, while the Liberals and Québec Solidaire voted against it.
- April 12 – Christine Fréchette is elected as leader of the CAQ.
- April 15 – Fréchette is appointed premier, following Legault's resignation.

=== June ===
- June 11 –
  - the Coalition Avenir Québec (CAQ) government abandons its Constitution of Quebec bill due to opposition from the Liberal Party and Québec Solidaire.
  - The National Assembly in Quebec passes (103-1), the Coalition Avenir Québec (CAQ) government Bill that bans the sale of energy drinks to people under 16. Quebec becomes the first Canadian province/jurisdiction in North America to do this.
- June 22 – 2026 Montreal shooting
- June 23 – it was announced that there would be no English debate during the election. This was the second consecutive election that the Coalition Avenir Québec (CAQ) and Parti Québécois (PQ) declined to participate in a debate in English. The Québec solidaire and the Conservative Party of Quebec had agreed to a debate.

=== August ===
- August 18 – Parti Québécois (PQ) leader Paul St-Pierre Plamondon announces that the PQ remains committed to holding a independence referendum during a first term in government, but it would not hold one before January 20, 2029, when President of the United States Donald Trump is scheduled to leave office at the expiry of his second term.

=== October ===
- October 5 – 2026 Quebec general election, the Parti Québécois wins, forming its first government since 2012.
- October 6 – Christine Fréchette resigns as Coalition_Avenir_Québec leader.
- October 9 – Mathieu Lacombe is removed from the CAQ caucus and as a Cabinet minister after attending a Parti Québécois victory rally.
- October 15 – All 59 elected Parti Québécois MNAs do not take the Oath of Allegiance to the King upon taking their seats in the National Assembly of Quebec.
- October 21 – Paul St-Pierre Plamondon is sworn in as Quebec premier, in reflection of his desire to abolish the monarchy in Quebec, St-Pierre Plamondon requested that Lieutenant Governor of Quebec Manon Jeannotte not attend.

== Scheduled events ==
- Plamondon ministry will be formed.

== Deaths ==
January

- January 4: Céline Bellot (lawyer, criminologist and academic) (b. 1970)
- January 12: Henri Dorion (geographer) (b. 1935)
- January 17: Phil Goyette (hockey player) (b. 1933)
- January 23: Jean Dorion, politician, sociologist, and Quebec nationalist leader (b. 1942)

February

- February 2: Jacques Tremblay, politician (b. 1942)
- February 3: Fernand Ouellette, writer (b. 1930)
- February 8: Franco Nuovo, journalist and television presenter (b. 1953)
- February 21: Raymond Bouchard, actor (b. 1945)
- February 26: André Vanasse, writer (b. 1942)

March

- March 5: Jacques Michel, singer (b. 1941)
- March 12: Francine Descarries, sociologist (b. 1942)
- March 20: Rodger Brulotte, broadcaster (b. 1947)

April

- April 1 : Louis Saia, screenwriter and film director (b. 1950)
- April 3 : Guy Jutras, boxing referee and judge (b. 1931)
- April 7 : Alex Hilton, boxer (b. 1964)
- April 10 : Gabor Szilasi, photographer (b. 1928)

May

- May 5 : Claude Morin, politician (b. 1929)
