= 2024 in Canada =

- Decades: 2000s; 2010s; 2020s
- See also: History of Canada; Timeline of Canadian history; List of years in Canada

Events from the year 2024 in Canada.

== Incumbents ==
=== The Crown ===
- Monarch – Charles III

=== Federal government ===
- Governor General – Mary Simon
- Prime Minister – Justin Trudeau
- Parliament – 44th

=== Provincial governments ===
==== Lieutenant Governors ====
- Lieutenant Governor of Alberta – Salma Lakhani
- Lieutenant Governor of British Columbia – Janet Austin
- Lieutenant Governor of Manitoba – Anita Neville
- Lieutenant Governor of New Brunswick – Brenda Murphy
- Lieutenant Governor of Newfoundland and Labrador – Joan Marie Aylward
- Lieutenant Governor of Nova Scotia – Arthur LeBlanc (until 13 December); then Michael Savage
- Lieutenant Governor of Ontario – Edith Dumont
- Lieutenant Governor of Prince Edward Island – Antoinette Perry (until 17 October); then Wassim Salamoun
- Lieutenant Governor of Quebec – J. Michel Doyon (until 25 January); then Manon Jeannotte
- Lieutenant Governor of Saskatchewan – Russell Mirasty

==== Premiers ====
- Premier of Alberta – Danielle Smith
- Premier of British Columbia – David Eby
- Premier of Manitoba – Wab Kinew
- Premier of New Brunswick – Blaine Higgs (until November 2); then Susan Holt
- Premier of Newfoundland and Labrador – Andrew Furey
- Premier of Nova Scotia – Tim Houston
- Premier of Ontario – Doug Ford
- Premier of Prince Edward Island – Dennis King
- Premier of Quebec – François Legault
- Premier of Saskatchewan – Scott Moe

=== Territorial governments ===
==== Commissioners ====
- Commissioner of Northwest Territories – Margaret Thom (until May 14); then Gerald W. Kisoun
- Commissioner of Nunavut – Eva Aariak
- Commissioner of Yukon – Adeline Webber

==== Premiers ====
- Premier of Northwest Territories – R.J. Simpson
- Premier of Nunavut – P.J. Akeeagok
- Premier of Yukon – Ranj Pillai

== Events ==
=== January ===
- January 1 – The inaugural game of the Professional Women's Hockey League is held at the Mattamy Athletic Centre in Toronto. New York played against Toronto and won 4–0. Ella Shelton of New York scored the first goal in the league's history.
- January 2 – A Mississauga Transit bus collides with another vehicle and ends up in a ditch, injuring 12.
- January 23
  - A British Aerospace Jetstream crashes shortly after taking off from a runway near Fort Smith Airport in the Northwest Territories. Six of the seven passengers and crew are killed.
  - A firebomb and shooting attack occurs at Edmonton City Hall and causes an estimated $100,000 in property damage without causing casualties.
- January 29 – 2024 Conception Bay East–Bell Island provincial by-election in Newfoundland and Labrador is held. The seat is by the Liberal candidate Fred Hutton.
- January 30 – Hockey Canada sexual assault scandal: Four current National Hockey League players who took part in the 2018 World Junior Ice Hockey Championships are charged with sexual assault in London, Ontario, in connection with the 2018 investigation.
- January 31 – Alberta Premier Danielle Smith announces plans to require parental consent for students under 15 years old seeking to change their gender pronouns and prohibit hormonal treatment, puberty blockers and gender affirming surgery for children under 15 years old.

=== February ===
- February 7 – 2024 Borden-Kinkora provincial by-election in Prince Edward Island is held. The seat is won by the Green candidate Matt MacFarlane.
- February 22 – Residents of Westlock Alberta, votes to ban pride flags and coloured crosswalks on municipal property.
- February 29 – The Quebec Court of Appeal rules in favor of Quebec's Bill 21.

=== March ===
- March 1 – A fire destroys the Covered Bridge Potato Chips factory near Hartland, New Brunswick.
- March 4 – 2024 Durham federal by-election is held. The seat is won by Conservative candidate Jamil Jivani.
- March 6 – Six people are killed, including four children, and another person is injured during a mass murder at a home in Ottawa. A man is arrested.
- March 15 – Quebec Premier François Legault meets with Prime Minister Justin Trudeau to ask him to give Quebec total control over immigration powers, which Trudeau rejects. In response, Parti Québécois Paul St-Pierre Plamondon repeats his calls for a referendum on the issue similar to its calls a few weeks before.
- March 18–24 – 2024 World Figure Skating Championships in Montreal.
- March 31 – Haitian crisis: Canada deploys 70 members of its armed forces to Jamaica to train peacekeepers for a future intervention in Haiti.

=== April ===
- April 1
  - Jacob Flickinger, a dual American-Canadian World Central Kitchen aid worker is killed by an Israeli drone strike alongside six other volunteers while delivering aid to the Gaza Strip amid its humanitarian crisis. Foreign minister Mélanie Joly calls for a full investigation into the attack.
  - The population of Canada reaches 41 million, a growth of around 240 thousand people since the start of the year.
- April 2–22
  - The Candidates Tournament 2024 is held in Toronto.
  - The Women's Candidates Tournament 2024 is also held in Toronto.
- April 8 – Parts of Southern Ontario, Quebec, New Brunswick, Nova Scotia, Prince Edward Island and Newfoundland and Labrador experience a total solar eclipse.
- April 9 – Quebec Premier François Legault says Quebec might hold a referendum on immigration powers if Prime Minister Justin Trudeau does not give the province more immigration powers.
- April 12 – Canada pledges $132.2 million to Sudan to help people affected by the country's ongoing humanitarian crisis.
- April 15 – The 2024 Fogo Island-Cape Freels provincial by-election is held, won by Progressive Conservative candidate Jim McKenna.
- April 28 – A cyber attack forces a temporary shutdown of operations at London Drugs.

=== May ===
- May 2
  - The National Assembly of Quebec votes to renewal Bill 21 by using the notwithstanding clause for five more years until 2029. The assembly vote was 83 for and 26 opposed. Coalition Avenir Québec (CAQ) and Parti Québécois (PQ) vote yes, while the Quebec Liberal Party and Québec solidaire vote against.
  - The 2024 Lambton—Kent—Middlesex provincial by-election and 2024 Milton provincial by-election are held.
- May 10–15 – 2024 Canadian wildfires: Evacuation orders are issued in parts of British Columbia and Alberta due to wildfires.
- May 18 – Three people are killed after a speed boat and a fishing boat collide in Bobs Lake, Ontario.
- May 27 – 2024 Baie Verte-Green Bay provincial by-election in Newfoundland and Labrador held. The seat is won by Progressive Conservative Lin Paddock
- May 31 – Serial killer Robert Pickton dies from injuries sustained after being attacked in Port-Cartier prison on May 19.

=== June ===
- June 2 – The Edmonton Oilers advance to the 2024 Stanley Cup Final after defeating the Dallas Stars 2–1 in Game 6 of the Western Conference Final, the first Canadian-based team to do so since 2021. The Oilers have not been to the Finals since 2006.
- June 5 – The National Security and Intelligence Committee of Parliamentarians releases the Special Report on Foreign Interference in Canada’s Democratic Processes and Institutions, alleging that certain MPs and senators willingly colluded with foreign states, including India and China. The Public Safety Minister of Canada, Dominic LeBlanc, refused to reveal the parliamentarians under suspicion, stating that it would be inappropriate to do so.
- June 9 - A fire destroys St. Anne's Anglican Church in Toronto. The building suffered extensive damage including one of the artwork murals from the Group of Seven (artists).
- June 10 – Carolyn Parrish wins the 2024 Mississauga mayoral by-election.
- June 12 – The Royal Canadian Geographical Society announces that a Canadian-led team has located the wreckage of Quest, the polar exploration ship of the Shackleton–Rowett Expedition off the coast of Labrador, Newfoundland and Labrador.
- June 17 – Two people are killed in a shooting in an office building in Toronto. The suspected gunman is found dead at the scene.
- June 19 – Canada adds Iran's Revolutionary Guard Corps to its list of terrorist entities.
- June 21 – The Ontario Science Centre permanently closes over health and safety concerns over the roof, due to failing roof panels.
- June 22 – Naheed Nenshi wins the 2024 Alberta New Democratic Party leadership election.
- June 24
  - The Edmonton Oilers lose Game 7 of the 2024 Stanley Cup Final 1–2 to the Florida Panthers, after erasing a 3–0 series deficit. Oilers captain Connor McDavid wins the Conn Smythe Trophy for most valuable player in the 2024 Stanley Cup playoffs, becoming first losing player since 2003 to win award.
  - Conservative candidate Don Stewart wins the 2024 Toronto—St. Paul's federal by-election.

=== July ===
- July 3 – Lieutenant General Jennie Carignan is appointed as the first female Chief of the Defence Staff of the Canadian Armed Forces. She formally assumes the position on July 18, with a promotion to the rank of General.
- July 5 – LCBO workers go on strike for the first time in the corporation's history.
- July 10–11 – Remnants of Hurricane Beryl cause flooding across Southern Ontario and parts of Quebec. One person is killed in Wolfville, Nova Scotia after being swept away in a flash flood.
- July 11 – Serial killer Jeremy Skibicki is convicted for the murders of four indigenous women in Manitoba in 2022.
- July 13 – An evacuation order is issued for 9,000 residents of Labrador City and Wabush, Newfoundland and Labrador, due to wildfires.
- July 16 – Parts of Southern Ontario experience rainstorms over multiple days, causing Union Station and parts of the Don Valley Parkway to shut down due to flooding. Hydro One claims that 123,000 customers lose electricity due to the flooding.
- July 21
  - It is confirmed that the bodies of Briton Sarah Packwood and her Canadian husband Brett Clibbery, who disappeared on June 18 while sailing their eco-friendly yacht across the Atlantic Ocean, were found on Sable Island near Nova Scotia on July 12.
  - Wildfires continue to spread in northern Alberta, prompting emergency evacuations in John D'Or Prairie 215, Fox Lake and Garden River. At least 55 of 158 active wildfires are reported as "out of control".
- July 22 – The LCBO strike ends.
- July 24
  - Two wildfires burning in Jasper National Park reach the Jasper townsite in Alberta, causing several structure fires, with over 25,000 residents evacuating their homes since 22 July. By 25 July, between 30 and 50 percent of the town is estimated to have been destroyed. Air quality in Calgary and the surrounding areas are raised to "high risk" as winds blow smoke into the region.
  - The Canadian Olympic Committee expels two members of the women's soccer team coaching staff from the Olympics following a spying incident involving a drone disrupting New Zealand's training session. FIFA initiates disciplinary proceedings.
- July 25 – The Canada Revenue Agency announces it will revoke the charity status of the Jewish National Fund, stating that the use of its donations to fund the IDF's military infrastructure violates Canadian tax laws.
- July 27 – In response to the spying incident involving the Canada women's national soccer team coaching staff using drones to spy on the New Zealand team, FIFA deducts six points from Canada in the Paris Olympics women's football tournament and bans three coaches for one year, including head coach Bev Priestman.

=== August ===
- August 9 – The remnants of Hurricane Debby strike eastern Canada, causing the rainiest single day in the history of Montreal and becoming the costliest climate event in Quebec history, exceeding the 1998 ice storm, with over $2.5 billion in insured damage.
- August 18–25 – 2024 World Rowing Championships.
- August 22
  - 2024 Canada railway dispute: Railway workers at Canadian National Railway and Canadian Pacific Kansas City fail to reach an agreement in labour negotiations, resulting in a strike that halts rail freight traffic.
  - Jamie Korab wins the 2024 Waterford Valley provincial by-election.
- August 26 – Canada announces a 100% tariff on imports of Chinese-made electric vehicles and a 25% tariff on Chinese steel and aluminum.

=== September ===
- September 4
  - The New Democratic Party ends its supply and confidence agreement with the Liberal government of Prime Minister Justin Trudeau.
  - Pakistani resident Muhammad Shahzeb Khan, also known as Shazeb Jadoon, is arrested in Ormstown, Quebec on suspicion of plotting attacks against Jewish people in the United States on the anniversary of the 7 October attacks on behalf of the Islamic State.
- September 5–15 – 2024 Toronto International Film Festival.
- September 9 – Finnish-Canadian sportswear mogul Peter Nygård is sentenced to 11 years in prison for sexual assault after being accused of attacking five women in his downtown Toronto office.
- September 11
  - The Toronto International Film Festival says screenings of Russians at War, a controversial documentary depicting Russian soldiers in Ukraine, will go ahead as planned, despite Ontario's public broadcaster, TVO, pulling its support amid outcry from Ukrainian Canadians. However, the festival organizers cancel all screenings on 12 September, citing "significant threats" to public safety.
  - Authorities announce the recovery of The Roaring Lion, a 1941 photographic portrait of Winston Churchill by Yousuf Karsh that was stolen from the Fairmont Château Laurier Hotel in Ottawa between 2021 and 2022, in Italy. The photo is reinstalled at the hotel on November 15.
- September 16
  - New Democratic candidate Leila Dance wins the 2024 Elmwood—Transcona federal by-election
  - Bloc Québécois candidate Louis-Philippe Sauvé wins the 2024 LaSalle—Émard—Verdun federal by-election.
- September 19 – Progressive Conservative candidate Tyler Allsopp wins the 2024 Bay of Quinte provincial by-election.
- September 22 – Three people are injured in a stabbing attack at a mosque in Châteauguay, Montreal. The perpetrator is arrested and charged.
- September 24 – The University of Waterloo and Lakehead University announce that they have positively identified bones found on King William Island in 1982 as those of James Fitzjames, captain of HMS Erebus during Franklin's lost expedition.
- September 25 – Prime Minister Justin Trudeau's Liberal government survives a no-confidence vote in Parliament filed by the Conservative Party.

=== October ===
- October 1 – Trudeau's Liberal government survives another no-confidence vote in Parliament filed by the Conservative Party.
- October 2
  - Nikolaj Sorensen is suspended from figure skating for six years by Skate Canada following an investigation by the Office of the Sport Integrity Commissioner into sexual maltreatment dating back to 2012.
  - The first case of domestically-acquired rabies in Ontario since 1967 is recorded in a child who died after coming into contact with a bat at their residence north of Greater Sudbury.
- October 4 – Two people are killed and three others are injured, including one critically, in a building fire suspected to be caused by arson at a three-storey building in the Old Montreal neighbourhood of Montreal.
- October 14 – India recalls its high commissioner to Canada, Sanjay Kumar Verma, in retaliation to Ottawa placing him and other Indian diplomats under investigation over the murder of Canadian national and Sikh separatist Hardeep Singh Nijjar in 2023. It also orders the expulsion of Canada's acting high commissioner Stewart Ross Wheeler and five other diplomats.
- October 17 – During the Saskatchewan election campaign, premier of Saskatchewan Scott Moe announces his intent to immediately enact rules requiring school students to use the changing rooms that correspond to their biological sex.
- October 19
  - The 2024 British Columbia general election is held. After vote counting completed on October 28, New Democrats win a slim majority.
- October 20 – Marie-Léonie Paradis is canonized as a saint of the Roman Catholic Church by Pope Francis.
- October 21
  - The 2024 New Brunswick general election is held, resulting in a Liberal majority government. Liberal leader Susan Holt is scheduled to become the first female premier of New Brunswick.
  - Two hitmen plead guilty before the Supreme Court of British Columbia for the 2022 murder of Sikh businessman Ripudaman Singh Malik, who was acquitted of involvement in the 1985 bombing of Air India Flight 182, in Surrey.
- October 23 – The Bank of Canada lowers the key interest rate to 3.75%, a drop of 0.5%. This was after inflation fell to 2%, with the Bank of Canada wanting to increase demand.
- October 28 – The 2024 Saskatchewan general election is held. The Saskatchewan Party wins a fifth consecutive majority government.

=== November ===
- November 2 – Alberta Premier Danielle Smith wins a mandatory leadership review by UCP membership with 91.5% of the vote.
- November 14–December 8 – Taylor Swift embarks on her nine stops in Toronto and Vancouver for the highly anticipated Eras Tour. The shows in Canada mark the end of the Eras Tour overall.
- November 15 – Workers at Canada Post go on strike after failing to reach an agreement over wages and workplace safety with the firm's management. The strike ends on December 17.
- November 17 – The 111th Grey Cup in Vancouver, British Columbia, is won by the Toronto Argonauts, 41–24, against the Winnipeg Blue Bombers.
- November 20 – Randy Boissonnault resigns as Minister of Employment, Workforce Development and Official Languages after reports emerge that he had falsely claimed indigenous ancestry.
- November 22 – Activist Pat King is convicted on charges related to the Canada convoy protest in 2022.
- November 25 – President-elect Donald Trump promises to impose a 25% tariff on all Canadian goods. In response, Ontario premier Doug Ford calls for a meeting of all premiers and Prime Minister Justin Trudeau.
- November 26 – 2024 Nova Scotia general election is held. The Progressive Conservatives win a second consecutive majority government.

=== December ===
- December 3
  - The Government of Canada officially designates the Yemen-based Houthi movement as a terrorist organization due to its attacks on civilian and military vessels.
  - The Alberta legislature passes three anti transgender bills. One banning doctors from treating those under 16 with puberty blockers or hormone therapy, One banning transgender athletes from competing in female sports, and another one requiring children under 16 to have parental consent if they want to change their names or pronouns at school.
- December 16 – Chrystia Freeland resigns from her positions as finance minister and deputy prime minister in the Trudeau Cabinet amid policy disagreements, heightening questions about Justin Trudeau's leadership. Dominic LeBlanc is appointed finance minister, while the position of deputy prime minister is kept vacant.
- December 16–present — 2024 Canadian political crisis: Following resignations by major Trudeau cabinet members, the government enters a political crisis as multiple Liberal Party members, the NDP, and several opposition parties call for Trudeau's resignation and a new election.
- December 18 – The Congregation Beth Tikvah synagogue and a related building in Dollard-des-Ormeaux, Montreal are hit by a suspected arson attack.
- December 20 – Trudeau implements a cabinet reshuffle, appointing eight new ministers and moving four others.
- December 28 – A Bombardier Q400 aircraft operated by PAL Airlines on behalf of Air Canada Express is damaged after making a rough landing and catching fire at Halifax Stanfield International Airport. No injuries are reported.

== Art and entertainment ==
- List of Canadian films of 2024
- 2024 in Canadian soccer
- 2024 in Canadian music
- 2024 in Canadian television
- List of Canadian submissions for the Academy Award for Best International Feature Film

== Holidays ==
- January 1 – New Year's Day
- February 19 – Family Day
- March 29 – Good Friday
- May 20 – Victoria Day
- July 1 – Canada Day
- September 2 – Labour Day
- September 30 – National Day for Truth and Reconciliation
- October 14 – Thanksgiving Day
- November 11 – Remembrance Day
- December 25 – Christmas Day

== Deaths ==
=== January ===
- January 1 – René Verzier, cinematographer (b. 1934)
- January 2 – Connie Madigan, ice hockey player (b. 1934)
- January 3 – Paul Theriault, ice hockey coach (b. 1950)
- January 4 – Alan Redway, lawyer and politician (b. 1935)
- January 5 – Jack Masters, politician and Mayor of Thunder Bay (b. 1931)
- January 6
  - Burke Dales, football player (b. 1977)
  - Erwin Schild, German-born rabbi and author (b. 1920)
- January 7 – Martha Black, art historian (b. 1945)
- January 8 – Normand de Bellefeuille, poet, writer, literary critic, and essayist (b. 1949)
- January 10
  - Jean Forest, politician (b. 1926)
  - Peter H. Russell, political scientist (b. 1932)
- January 11
  - Ed Broadbent, politician (b. 1936)
  - Robin Brownlee, ice hockey journalist and radio host (b. 1958)
  - John Short, sports journalist and broadcaster (b. 1937)
- January 12
  - Bill Gairdner, track and field athlete (b. 1940)
  - Pierre Mailloux, psychiatrist and radio show host (b. 1949)
- January 13
  - Glen Cochrane, ice hockey player (b. 1958)
  - Bernard Descôteaux, journalist (b. 1947)
- January 15 – Nerene Virgin, journalist, actress, educator, author, and television host (b. 1946)
- January 17
  - Shawnacy Barber, American-born track and field athlete (b. 1994)
  - Brian Brett, poet, journalist, editor, and novelist (b. 1950)
  - Al Kolyn, politician (b. 1932)
  - Serge Laprade, singer and radio broadcaster (b. 1941)
- January 19 – Yves St-Denis, politician (b. 1963)
- January 20 – Norman Jewison, film and television director and producer (b. 1926)
- January 22
  - Derrick Bragg, politician (b. 1964)
  - Gary V. Nelson, urban missiologist (b. 1953)
- January 23
  - Bruce Covernton, football player (b. 1966)
  - Jack Riddell, politician (b. 1931)
- January 26 – Becky Barrett, American-born politician (b. 1942)
- January 29 – Blaine Lacher, ice hockey player (b. 1970)

=== February ===
- February 3 – Victor M. Power, politician and Mayor of Timmins, Ontario (b. 1934)
- February 8
  - Toddy Kehoe, politician, philanthropist, and disabilities activist (b. 1918)
  - Twomad, YouTube personality (b. 2000)
  - Daryl Kramp, politician (b. 1947)
- February 10
  - Henry Blackaby, evangelical pastor (b. 1935)
  - Jodi White, philanthropist and political operative (b. 1946)
- February 12
  - Patty Sahota, politician (b. 1969)
  - Len Stirling, politician (b. 1937)
- February 13 – Gerry James, football and ice hockey player (b. 1934)
- February 22 – Jean-Guy Talbot, ice hockey player and coach (b. 1932)
- February 23
  - Chris Gauthier, English-born actor (b. 1976)
  - Don Poile, ice hockey player (b. 1932)
- February 24 – Kenneth Mitchell, actor (b. 1974)
- February 24 – Denis St-Jules, writer and radio broadcaster (b. 1950)
- February 28 – Werner Nold, film editor (b. 1933)
- February 29
  - Brian Mulroney, lawyer, businessman, politician, and 18th prime minister of Canada (b. 1939)
  - Paul Vachon, professional wrestler (b. 1937)

=== March ===
- March 2
  - Tim Ecclestone, ice hockey player (b. 1947)
  - Wally Firth, politician (b. 1935)
  - Paul Houde, actor and radio-television presenter (b. 1954)
- March 3 – Eleanor Collins, jazz singer, television host, and civic leader (b. 1919)
- March 4 – Paryse Martin, American-born artist (b. 1959)
- March 7 – Connie Eaves, biologist (b. 1944)
- March 8
  - Guy Boutilier, politician (b. 1959)
  - Ron Busniuk, ice hockey player (b. 1948)
- March 9 – A. K. Dewdney, mathematician, computer scientist, author, filmmaker, and conspiracy theorist (b. 1941)
- March 10 – Margot Lemire, writer, poet, and playwright (b. 1946)
- March 12
  - Kim Rudd, politician and businesswoman (b. 1957)
  - Sean Tallaire, ice hockey player (b. 1973)
- March 13 – Julius Kohanyi, film director, television producer, and writer (b. 1932)
- March 18
  - George Garrett, broadcast journalist (b. 1934)
  - Jennifer Leak, Welsh-born actress (b. 1947)
  - Roy McMurtry, lawyer, judge, and politician (b. 1932)
  - Chris Simon, ice hockey player (b. 1972)
- March 19
  - Raymond Boulanger, bush pilot and drug trafficker (b. 1948)
  - Léonard Forest, filmmaker, poet, and essayist (b. 1928)
  - Yves Michaud, politician (b. 1930)
- March 23 – Paul Masnick, ice hockey player (b. 1931)
- March 24 – Gordon Singleton, track cyclist (b. 1956)
- March 25 – Dave Forbes, ice hockey player (b. 1948)
- March 29 – Werner Schmidt, politician, teacher, and school principal (b. 1932)
- March 30
  - Ardeth G. Kapp, cleric and writer (b. 1931)
  - Benoît Pelletier, lawyer, academic, and politician (b. 1960)
- March 31 – Michael McMartin, Canadian-Australian music manager and businessman (b. 1945)

=== April ===
- April 1 – Anne Innis Dagg, zoologist, feminist, and author (b. 1933)
- April 2
  - Thérèse Gouin Décarie, developmental psychologist and educator (b. 1923)
  - Jim Hopson, football player and executive (b. 1951)
- April 4 – Iona Campagnolo, politician and lieutenant governor of British Columbia (b. 1932)
- April 5 – Phil Nimmons, jazz clarinetist, composer, bandleader, and educator (b. 1923)
- April 8
  - Jon Card, German-born drummer (b. 1960)
  - Sue Stultz, politician (b. 1952 or 1953)
- April 10 – Gordon Balser, educator and politician (b. 1954)
- April 12 – Robert MacNeil, Canadian-American journalist and writer (b. 1931)
- April 14 – Jacques Lussier, actor (b. 1960)
- April 17 – Harry Schachter, Austrian-born biochemist and glycobiologist (b. 1933)
- April 18
  - Helen Doan, supercentenarian (b. 1911)
  - Wally Harris, NHL referee (b. 1935)
- April 21 – Pete Woolley, football player (b. 1929)
- April 22 – Al Shaver, sportscaster (b. 1927)
- April 23
  - Ed Chadwick, ice hockey player (b. 1933)
  - Mary V. Seeman, psychiatrist (b. 1935)
- April 24 – Bob Cole, sportscaster (b. 1933)
- April 26 – Lyle Bauer, football player and executive (b. 1958)
- April 27 – Jean-Pierre Ferland, singer-songwriter (b. 1934)
- April 28 – Alan Scarfe, English-born actor, stage director, and author (b. 1946)

=== May ===
- May 1
  - Michael Brown, sprint canoer (b. 1937)
  - William Toye, editor, author, and literary critic (b. 1926)
- May 5 – Fernand Lalonde, lawyer and politician (b. 1932)
- May 9 – Rex Murphy, commentator and author (b. 1947)
- May 10 – Jim Peterson, politician (b. 1941)
- May 11
  - Steve Andrascik, ice hockey player (b. 1948)
  - Ron Ellis, ice hockey player (b. 1945)
- May 13
  - Bill Friday, ice hockey referee (b. 1933)
  - Arthur Irving, businessman and president of Irving Oil (b. 1930)
  - Alice Munro, author (b. 1931)
- May 14
  - Diane Deans, politician (b. 1958)
  - Jacques Monet, historian and Catholic priest (b. 1930)
- May 15
  - Darren Dutchyshen, sportscaster (b. 1966)
  - Yvon Picotte, politician (b. 1941)
- May 16 – Jaye Robinson, politician (b. 1962)
- May 17 – Isabella Dryden, educator (b. 1917)
- May 19
  - Caroline Dawson, Chilean-born writer (b. 1979)
  - Claude Villeneuve, academic and biologist (b. 1954)
- May 22 – John Upham, baseball player (b. 1940)
- May 23
  - Russell Fraser, politician (b. 1934)
  - Eric Upton, football player (b. 1953)
- May 28 – Morley Rosenberg, lawyer, politician, and Mayor of Kitchener, Ontario (b. 1937)
- May 29 – Cayouche, singer-songwriter (b. 1949)
- May 31 – Robert Pickton, serial killer, serial rapist, and pig farmer (b. 1949)

=== June ===
- June 4
  - Bill Estabrooks, educator and politician (b. 1947)
  - Yves Morin, cardiologist, physician, scientist, and Senator (b. 1929)
- June 7 – Dale Yakiwchuk, ice hockey player (b. 1958)
- June 8 – Anthony Brummet, educator and politician (b. 1931)
- June 11 – Gilles Perron, politician (b. 1940)
- June 15 – Érik Canuel, film and television director (b. 1961)
- June 19 – Roland Armitage, veterinarian, businessman, politician, and Mayor of West Carleton Township (b. 1925)
- June 20
  - Dave Gatherum, ice hockey player (b. 1932)
  - Dylon Powley, soccer player (b. 1996)
  - Donald Sutherland, actor (b. 1935)
- June 21 – James K. Irving, businessman (b. 1928)
- June 24
  - Mike Farnan, Irish-born politician (b. 1941)
  - Melvin M. Hawkrigg, chancellor of McMaster University and football player (b. 1930)
- June 25
  - Billy Carter, ice hockey player (b. 1937)
  - Ray St. Germain, singer, author, and television host (b. 1940)
- June 28
  - Gene Achtymichuk, ice hockey player (b. 1932)
  - Marty Pavelich, ice hockey player (b. 1927)

=== July ===
- July 2
  - Rick Cluff, journalist (b. 1950)
  - Karl Jaffary, American-born politician (b. 1936)
- July 7
  - Claude Ferragne, high jumper (b. 1952)
  - Robert Arthur Williams, politician (b. 1933)
  - Rachel Wyatt, English-Canadian dramatist (b. 1929)
- July 9 – Sharon Murdock, politician (b. 1946)
- July 10 – Alex Janvier, First Nations painter (b. 1935)
- July 11 – Grace Eiko Thomson, Japanese-Canadian internment camp survivor (b. 1933)
- July 17
  - Doug Faulkner, Scottish-born politician and Mayor of the Regional Municipality of Wood Buffalo (b. 1942)
  - Alcides Lanza, Argentine-born composer, conductor, pianist, and music educator (b. 1929)
- July 18 – Jeremy N. McNeil, British-Canadian biologist and zoologist (b. 1944)
- July 24
  - Leo Burke, professional wrestler (b. 1948)
  - Alan Hyland, politician (b. 1945)
- July 26 – Frank Chiarelli, ice hockey player (b. 1931)
- July 27 – Murray Costello, ice hockey player, executive, and administrator (b. 1934)
- July 30 – Lyle Stewart, politician (b. 1951)
- July 31
  - Raymond Desfossés, gangster (b. 1950)
  - Taral Wayne, science fiction fan artist (b. 1951)

=== August ===
- August 6 – Sheila Kussner, philanthropist (b. 1932 or 1933)
- August 8 – Bruce Pirnie, American-born shot putter (b. 1942)
- August 12 – Marlene Catterall, politician (b. 1939)
- August 13 – Chuck Strahl, businessman and politician (b. 1957)
- August 14 – Denise Gagnon, actress (b. 1936)
- August 15 – Kevin Parsons, politician (b. 1961)
- August 22 – Marcel Parent, politician (b. 1932)
- August 24 – Michael Bawtree, Australian-born actor, director, author, and educator (b. 1937)
- August 26 – Paul Dwayne, country singer-songwriter (b. 1964)
- August 29
  - Darrel J. McLeod, Cree writer (b. 1957)
  - Max Nemni, political scientist and writer (b. 1935)
- August 30 – Michelle Fazzari, wrestler (b. 1987)
- August 31 – Stevie Cameron, journalist and author (b. 1943)

=== September ===
- September 4 – Larry Trader, ice hockey player (b. 1963)
- September 6 – Cathy Merrick, First Nations leader (b. 1961)
- September 7 – Bud Irving, football player (b. 1926)
- September 9 – Patricia Taylor, Australian-born microbiologist and virologist (b. 1929)
- September 12
  - Frank Oberle Sr., German-born businessman and politician (b. 1932)
  - Stephen Peat, ice hockey player (b. 1980)
- September 13
  - Ben Fairbrother, English-born football player (b. 1973)
  - Lois Wilson, politician and United Church minister (b. 1927)
- September 16
  - Paul-André Cadieux, ice hockey player, coach, and sports director (b. 1947)
  - Tony Whitford, politician (b. 1941)
- September 18 – Pat Pimm, politician (b. 1957)
- September 20 – Michael A. Brown, politician (b. 1950)
- September 24 – Francis Fox, politician (b. 1939)
- September 30 – Fayo, musician (b. 1977)

=== October ===
- October 1 – Maurice Henrie, writer and academic (b. 1936)
- October 2
  - Jason Cirone, Canadian-Italian ice hockey player (b. 1971)
  - Daniel Pinard, radio and television presenter and author (b. 1942)
  - Ken Tobias, musician (b. 1945)
- October 4 – John Henderson, ice hockey player (b. 1933)
- October 5
  - James DeFelice, actor, playwright and screenwriter (b. 1937)
  - Doc Harris, voice actor and radio personality (b. 1948)
  - Peter Ogilvie, sprinter (b. 1972)
- October 11 – Mike Bullard, stand-up comic and broadcaster (b. 1957)
- October 12 – Alvin Rakoff, film, television, and theatre director (b. 1927)
- October 15
  - Robert Fulford, journalist, magazine editor, essayist, and public intellectual (b. 1932)
  - Stan Persky, American-born writer, media commentator, and philosophy instructor (b. 1941)
- October 16 – Whit Tucker, football player (b. 1940)
- October 18
  - Moe Lemay, ice hockey player (b. 1962)
  - Donald B. Redford, Egyptologist and archaeologist (b. 1934)
- October 21 – Mimi Hines, actress, singer, and comedian (b. 1933)
- October 23 – Robert Sopuck, politician (b. 1951)
- October 25 – Bill Hay, ice hockey player and executive (b. 1935)
- October 28 – Andy Haydon, engineer and politician (b. 1933)

=== November ===
- November 1
  - Marcel Bédard, politician and Mayor of Beauport (b. 1940)
  - Faye Leung, businesswoman (b. 1931 or 1932)
  - Michael Ruse, British-born philosopher of science (b. 1940)
- November 2 – Darrel Janz, broadcast journalist (b. 1941)
- November 3 – Kathleen McGee, stand-up comedian (b. 1981)
- November 4
  - Gary Cormack, wheelchair curler (b. 1950)
  - James Penton, historian and author (b. 1932)
  - Murray Sinclair, lawyer, judge, politician, senator, and chancellor of Queen's University (b. 1951)
- November 8 – Gabriel Kney, German-born pipe organ builder (b. 1929)
- November 12 – John Horgan, politician, diplomat, leader of the British Columbia New Democratic Party, and the 36th premier of British Columbia (b. 1959)
- November 13 – Dan Hennessey, American-born voice actor (b. 1942)
- November 15 – Tom Forrestall, painter (b. 1936)
- November 20 – Chad Posthumus, basketball player (b. 1991)
- November 24 – Mike Hasenfratz, ice hockey referee (b. 1966)
- November 26 – Malcolm Smith, Canadian-American off-road racer (b. 1941)
- November 29
  - Anna Banana, artist (b. 1940)
  - Larry McIntyre, ice hockey player (b. 1949)

=== December ===
- December 2 – Louise Cotnoir, writer (b. 1948)
- December 3 – Aileen H. Cowan, painter and sculptor (b. 1926)
- December 6 – John McDermid, politician (b. 1940)
- December 7 – Alan Young, lawyer (b. 1955)
- December 9 – Gérard-Raymond Morin, politician (b. 1940)
- December 10 – Madeleine Arbour, designer, painter, and journalist (b. 1923)
- December 13 – Dan Coulter, politician (b. 1975)
- December 15
  - Robert H. McKercher, lawyer, national president of the Canadian Bar Association, and president of the Law Society of Saskatchewan (b. 1930)
  - Monique Vézina, politician and cabinet minister (b. 1935)
- December 19 – Paul Szabo, politician (b. 1948)
- December 23 – Angus MacInnes, actor (b. 1947)
- December 24 – Joe Average, artist (b. 1957)
- December 26 – Daniel Légère, labour leader (b. 1959)
- December 27 – Dayle Haddon, model and actress (b. 1948)
- December 30 – Sweet Daddy Siki, American-Canadian professional wrestler and singer (b. 1933)

== See also ==
- 2024 Canadian electoral calendar
