= 2025 in Quebec =

- Decades: 2000s; 2010s; 2020s
- See also: History of Canada; Timeline of Canadian history; List of years in Canada

== Incumbents ==
- 43rd Quebec Legislature
- Premier of Quebec: François Legault

== Events ==
- 2025 CF Montréal season
- 2025 Montreal Alouettes season
- 2024–25 Montreal Canadiens season
- 2025 Montreal Roses FC season
- 2024–25 Montreal Victoire season
- 2025 Ligue1 Québec féminine season
- 2025 Ligue1 Québec season
- 2025 Montreal Alliance season
- 2025–26 Montreal Victoire season
- 2025–26 Montreal Canadiens season

=== January ===
- January 14 – 19: 2025 Canadian Figure Skating Championships, Laval, Quebec
- January 14 – 19: 2025 Quebec Tankard, Alma, Quebec
- January 17: Revenu Québec workers begin nights and weekend strike.

=== February ===
- February 12–20: 4 Nations Face-Off, Montreal

=== March ===
- March 12-21: Strike by Concordia Research and Education Workers (CREW-CSN) at Concordia University.
- March 17: 2025 Terrebonne provincial by-election, The Parti Québécois wins.
- March 17-18: 400 daycares close as workers go on two-day strike.
- March 31: 1-day strike (Fédération des employé(e)s des services publics and the Fédération des professionnels(le)s) at Olympic Park, Montreal.

=== April ===
- April 16-17: 2025 Canadian federal election French-language and English-language debates to be held at Maison de Radio-Canada, Montreal
- April 28: 2025 Canadian federal election
- April 28-May 3: 2025 Canadian Wheelchair Curling Championship, Boucherville, Quebec

=== May ===
- May 10: UFC 315, Montreal
- May 20: Construction site collapse in Blainville, Quebec kills 1 and injures 3
- May 21: A landslide in Sainte-Monique, Centre-du-Québec destroyed one home, created a 300-metre crater, and forced nearby residents to evacuate.
- May 25: The Montreal Alliance played the first-ever outdoor professional basketball game against the Ottawa BlackJacks at Stade IGA in Jarry Park. The game ended at halftime due to moisture on the court.
- May 28: The National Assembly of Quebec unanimously voted for a motion calling on Quebec to abolish all ties with the monarchy. Coalition Avenir Québec, Parti Québécois, the Liberals and Québec solidaire voted for the motion.

=== June ===
- June 9-14: 2025 Quebec Liberal Party leadership election chooses Pablo Rodriguez as party leader.
- June 9-17: 2,400 maintenance workers affiliated with Syndicat du transport de Montréal-CSN strike against Société de transport de Montréal (STM).
- June 15: 2025 Canadian Grand Prix

=== July ===
- July 5: MLP Resurrection in Laval
- July 12: The government of Quebec fined LaSalle College for over-enrolling students in English-language programs
- July 16-August 3: 29th Fantasia International Film Festival in Montreal

=== August ===
- August 2: 2025 Bud Light 250
- August 10: 2025 Les 60 Tours Rousseau Métal
- August 11: 2025 Arthabaska provincial by-election, The Parti Québécois wins.
- August 26 – A committee recommends strengthening Quebec's religious symbol ban.
- August 28 – The Coalition Avenir Québec government of Quebec announces it will ban public prayer in public places.

=== September ===
- September 3: The Quebec government announced that its partnership with Northvolt ended, declaring a $270 million loss.
- September 10: François Legault conducts a major cabinet reshuffle.
- September 24: FC Supra du Québec, set to begin play in 2025 in the Canadian Premier League, are announced.

=== October ===
- October 8-19: 2025 Festival du nouveau cinéma in Montreal
- October 9: The Coalition Avenir Québec government of Quebec tables a draft Constitution of Quebec to the National Assembly of Quebec.

=== November ===
- November 2: 2025 Quebec municipal elections: Montreal, Gatineau, Lévis, Quebec City, Saguenay, Sherbrooke, Trois-Rivières.
- November 8: The 2025 Québec solidaire co-spokesperson election will be held.
- November 15: The Parti Québécois PQ leader, Paul St-Pierre Plamondon stats that if a sovereignty referendum were successful, Quebec would establish its own currency up to a decade after the vote. The PQ would also consider establishing an independent commission to evaluate creating its own currency, keeping the Canadian dollar, or adopting the American dollar.
- November 27: The Coalition Avenir Québec government of Quebec tables bill 9 that would strengthen the 2019 secularism bill 21.
- November 28-30: Northern Classic, an NCAA Division I men's college basketball tournament in Laval.
- November 29: Mass protest against Legault government organized by unions and community groups held in Montreal.

=== December ===
- The Crucifix that has hung in the Quebec City Council chamber since 1936 is taken down.
- December 17: Pablo Rodriguez resigns as leader of the Quebec Liberal Party.
