= 1948 in Canada =

- Decades: 1920s; 1930s; 1940s; 1950s; 1960s
- See also: History of Canada; Timeline of Canadian history; List of years in Canada

Events from the year 1948 in Canada.

== Incumbents ==
=== Crown ===
- Monarch – George VI

=== Federal government ===
- Governor General – the Viscount Alexander of Tunis
- Prime Minister – William Lyon Mackenzie King (until November 15) then Louis St. Laurent
- Chief Justice – Thibaudeau Rinfret (Quebec)
- Parliament – 20th

=== Provincial governments ===
==== Lieutenant governors ====
- Lieutenant Governor of Alberta – John C. Bowen
- Lieutenant Governor of British Columbia – Charles Arthur Banks
- Lieutenant Governor of Manitoba – Roland Fairbairn McWilliams
- Lieutenant Governor of New Brunswick – David Laurence MacLaren
- Lieutenant Governor of Nova Scotia – John Alexander Douglas McCurdy
- Lieutenant Governor of Ontario – Ray Lawson
- Lieutenant Governor of Prince Edward Island – Joseph Alphonsus Bernard
- Lieutenant Governor of Quebec – Eugène Fiset
- Lieutenant Governor of Saskatchewan – Reginald John Marsden Parker (until March 23) then John Michael Uhrich (from March 24)

==== Premiers ====
- Premier of Alberta – Ernest Manning
- Premier of British Columbia – Boss Johnson
- Premier of Manitoba – Stuart Garson (until November 13) then Douglas Campbell
- Premier of New Brunswick – John McNair
- Premier of Nova Scotia – Angus Macdonald
- Premier of Ontario – George A. Drew (until October 19) then Thomas Laird Kennedy
- Premier of Prince Edward Island – J. Walter Jones
- Premier of Quebec – Maurice Duplessis
- Premier of Saskatchewan – Tommy Douglas

=== Territorial governments ===
==== Commissioners ====
- Commissioner of Yukon – John Edward Gibben
- Commissioner of Northwest Territories – Hugh Llewellyn Keenleyside

== Events ==
- June 7 – Ontario election: George Drew's PCs win a second consecutive majority
- June 24 – Saskatchewan election: Tommy Douglas's Co-operative Commonwealth Federation wins a second consecutive majority
- July 22 – A second runoff referendum is held in the 1948 Newfoundland referendums; confederation with Canada is approved, leading to the eventual union between Canada and the Dominion of Newfoundland in March 1949.
- August 17 – Alberta election: Ernest Manning's Social Credit Party wins a fourth consecutive majority
- September 6 – The oil well Atlantic No. 3 (near Devon, Alberta), which had been running wild since March 21, catches fire. Smoke affects the atmosphere for hundreds of kilometres until the blaze is put out in November by a team led by Myron M. Kinley and Red Adair.
- October 19 – Thomas Kennedy becomes premier of Ontario, replacing George Drew
- November 13 – Douglas Campbell becomes premier of Manitoba, replacing Stuart Garson
- November 15 – Louis Saint Laurent becomes prime minister, replacing Mackenzie King

== Arts and literature ==
=== Awards ===
- See 1948 Governor General's Awards for a complete list of winners and finalists for those awards.
- Stephen Leacock Award: Paul Hiebert, Sarah Binks

== Sport ==
- February 2 – Barbara Ann Scott becomes the first Canadian to win the figure skating gold medal at the 1948 Winter Olympics in St. Moritz, Switzerland
- April 14 – The Toronto Maple Leafs win their seventh Stanley Cup by defeating the Detroit Red Wings 4 games to 0.
- April 30 – The Thunder Bay Junior Hockey League's Port Arthur West End Bruins win their only Memorial Cup by defeating the Ontario Hockey Association's Barrie Flyers 4 games to 0. All games were played at Maple Leaf Gardens in Toronto
- November 27 – The undefeated Calgary Stampeders win their first Grey Cup by defeating the Ottawa Rough Riders 12 to 7 in the 36th Grey Cup played at Varsity Stadium in Toronto. This Cup is notable for the Stampeders' fans making a party out of the game and launching the Grey Cup festival that precedes the championship game.

== Births ==
=== January to March ===
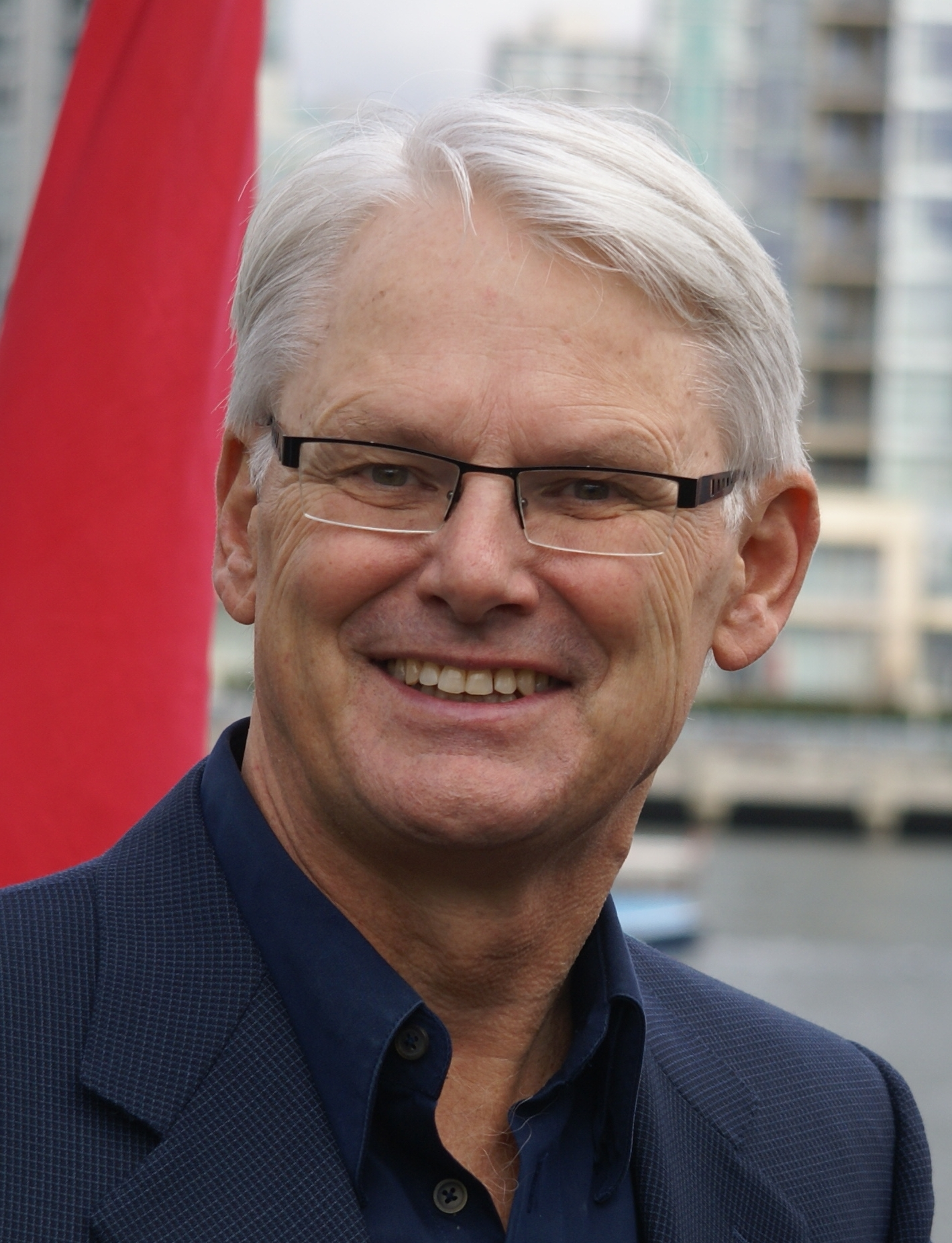
Gordon Campbell

- January 10 – Craig Russell, female impersonator (d. 1990)
- January 12 – Gordon Campbell, politician and 34th Premier of British Columbia
- January 13 – Pat O'Brien, politician
- January 15 – Andy Jones, comedian, writer, actor and director
- January 16 – Cliff Thorburn, snooker player, former world number one

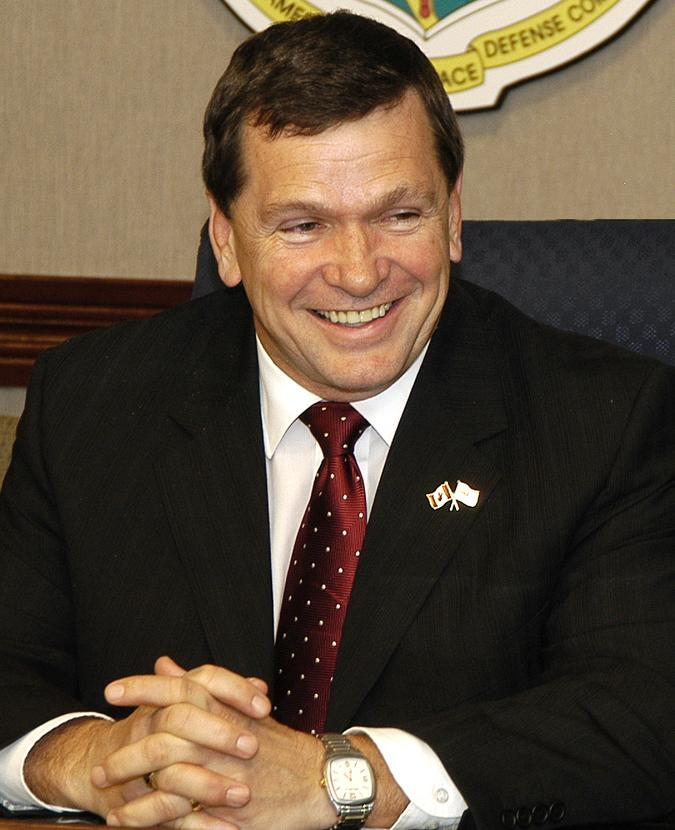
Frank McKenna

- January 19 – Frank McKenna, businessman, politician, 27th Premier of New Brunswick and diplomat
- January 25 – Sarkis Assadourian, politician
- January 29 – Marc Singer, actor
- February 11 – Shaughnessy Cohen, politician (d. 1998)
- February 13 – Allan Legere, serial killer, rapist, and arsonist (d. 2026)
- February 21 – Chuck Cadman, politician (d. 2005)
- March 14
  - Pierre Granche, sculptor (d. 1997)
  - Maria Minna, politician
- March 20 – Bobby Orr, ice hockey player
- March 31 – Gary Doer, politician and 20th Premier of Manitoba

=== April to June ===
- April 14 – Claude Vivier, composer (d. 1983 in France)
- April 16 – Reg Alcock, politician, minister, MP for Winnipeg South (1993–2006); President of the Treasury Board (2003–2006) (d. 2011)
- April 17 – Wilf Wedmann, high jumper (d. 2021)
- April 20 – Rémy Trudel, academic and politician
- May 11 – John Plohman, politician
- May 16 – Clif Evans, politician
- May 24 – Lorna Crozier, poet and essayist
- June 4
  - Margaret Gibson, novelist and short story writer (d. 2006)
  - Sandra Post, golfer, first Canadian to play on the LPGA Tour
- June 5 – Bill Smart, middle-distance runner and judge
- June 7 – Welwyn Wilton Katz, children's author
- June 23 – Myles Goodwyn, musician (d. 2023)
- June 29 – Leo Burke, wrestler (d. 2024)

=== July to September ===
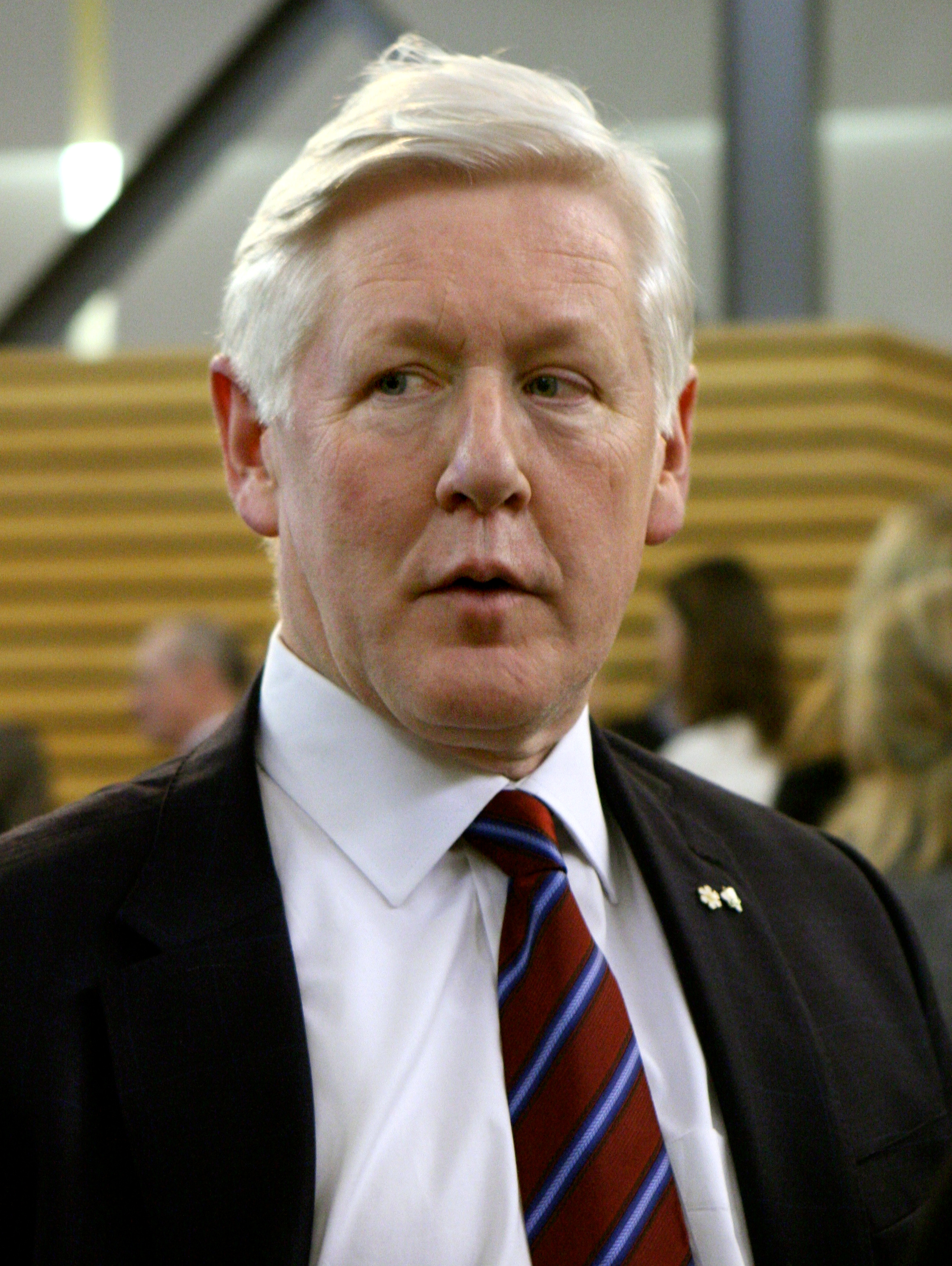
Bob Rae in 2007

- July 4 – Katherine Govier, novelist
- July 6 – Brad Park, ice hockey player
- July 8 – Raffi, children's entertainer, music producer, author and entrepreneur
- July 31 – Eddie Goldenberg, lawyer and political adviser (d. 2026)
- August 2 – Bob Rae, politician and 21st Premier of Ontario
- August 5 – Don Scott, politician
- August 14 – John Edzerza, Yukon MLA (d. 2011)
- August 31 – Marie-Lynn Hammond, folk singer-songwriter, broadcaster and playwright
- September 8 – Stephen Owen, politician (d. 2023)
- September 10 – Margaret Trudeau, wife of the late Pierre Trudeau, the 15th Prime Minister of Canada
- September 19 – James McCrae, politician
- September 21 – Bernard Jean, oboist, conductor, and music educator
- September 24 – Phil Hartman, actor, comedian, screenwriter and graphic artist (d. 1998)

=== October to December ===
- October 8 – Pat Binns, politician, 30th Premier of Prince Edward Island and diplomat
- October 9 – Brad Woodside, politician, Mayor of Fredericton, New Brunswick
- October 17 – Margot Kidder, actress (d. 2018)
- November 5 – Mike Neary, rower
- November 24 – Spider Robinson, science fiction author
- November 27 – David Branch, ice hockey administrator (d. 2026)
- December 7 – Jay Dahlgren, javelin thrower
- December 30
  - Rick Casson, politician
  - Pierre Blais, jurist, politician and Minister
- December 31 – René Robert, ice hockey player (d. 2021)

=== Full date unknown ===
- Marc Lortie, diplomat

== Deaths ==
- March 14 – Ernest Frederick Armstrong, politician (b. 1878)
- March 28 – John Duncan MacLean, teacher, physician, politician and Premier of British Columbia (b. 1873)
- May 20 – George Beurling, most successful Canadian fighter pilot of World War II (b. 1921)
- May 21 – James Ralston, lawyer, soldier, politician and Minister (b. 1881)

=== Full date unknown ===
- Margaret C. MacDonald, nurse (b. 1873)

== See also ==
- List of Canadian films
