= Céline Bellot =

Canadian lawyer, criminologist and academic (1970–2026)

Céline Bellot FRSC
- Born: 1970
- Died: 4 January 2026 (aged 55)

Academic background
- Education: Université de Montréal (PhD)
- Thesis: Le monde social de la rue: expériences des jeunes et pratiques d'intervention à Montréal (2001)

Academic work
- Discipline: Criminology
- Sub-discipline: Criminal profiling
- Institutions: Université de Montreal
- Website: Official website

Céline Bellot FRSC (1970 – 4 January 2026) was a Canadian lawyer, criminologist and academic who was a professor in the School of Social Work at the Université de Montréal. She directed the Observatory on Profiling, and was a member of the International Centre for Comparative Criminology.

== Life and career and career ==
Bellot was born in 1970. She received her doctorate in criminology from the University of Montreal in 2001 with a thesis Le monde social de la rue: expériences des jeunes et pratiques d'intervention à Montréal. Her postdoctoral fellowship was at the Université du Québec à Montréal.

In 2021, Bellot won the Acfas Pierre-Dansereau Prize, and in 2024 she was admitted to the Royal Society of Canada as a fellow in the Academy of Social Sciences.

Bellot died from breast cancer on 4 January 2026, at the age of 55.
