= Rose Kingdon =

Canadian broadcaster (1961–2026)

Rose Kingdon (1960 – 27 March 2026) was a Canadian broadcaster.

== Life and career ==
Kingdon was from Toronto, southwestern Ontario. She had two children, Sean and Ailish. She completed her graduation from the Radio Broadcasting program at Humber College in 1981.

She was a director at Broadcast News at The Canadian Press national news service. Starting as a reporter and editor in June 1985, she worked at the Canadian Press for 48 years. She also held roles including as an audio editor, newscaster and senior editor. Her first radio job was at CKLA in Guelph as a summer reliever. She also worked at CKEY in Toronto, then a subsidiary of The Canadian Press. Later, she moved to Broadcast News. Some of the coverage of the major events she had overseen included the World Trade Center attacks, the blackout of 2003, Canada's mission to Afghanistan, many federal and provincial elections, budgets and Olympic Games. She retired in 2023.

Kingdon was found dead at her home in Toronto on 27 March 2026. She was 65.

== Awards ==
Kingdon received a lifetime achievement award by the Radio Television Digital News Association of Canada.
