= 2026 Salsa on St. Clair festival shooting =

Mass shooting in Toronto, Canada

- Location of Salsa On St. Clair
- Location: 43.680789139419765°N 79.43018123438699°W; St. Clair Avenue West & Arlington Avenue, Toronto, Ontario, Canada
- Date: 11 July 2026 c. 8:12 p.m. (EST; UTC−05:00)
- Attack type: Mass shooting, shootout
- Weapon: Two unidentified firearms
- Deaths: 2
- Injuries: 5
- Victims: Cesar Vernaza; Shaquan Quashie
- Perpetrators: Jessiah Massaro-Gill; Lewis Downey
- Motive: Under investigation

On 11 July 2026 at c. 8:12 p.m. EST, two people opened fire on each other in a crowd at the Salsa on St. Clair festival in Toronto, Ontario, Canada, killing two people and injuring five others. Toronto police said the shooting was believed to be targeted.

== Background ==
Salsa on St. Clair is an annual street festival held in midtown Toronto along St. Clair Avenue West. Launched in 2005, it's recognized as one of the province's top 100 festivals by Festivals and Events Ontario, the event typically takes place over a weekend in mid-July. It attracts an estimated 340,000 visitors annually, with attendance reaching approximately 10,000 people at any given time.

== Shooting ==
At approximately 8:12 p.m. police responded to reports of active gunfire within the area of the festival and multiple victims. People at the festival ran, causing a stampede. Deputy Chief Frank Barredo said two people with guns opened fire on each other in a crowded area. Two unidentified firearms were recovered at the scene. Barredo added that they have three crime scenes. The exchange of gunfire, which occurred in a dense crowd of approximately 13,000 festivalgoers, resulted in two fatalities and five injuries.

== Victims ==
Victims who were killed from the shooting: Shaquan Quashie (left), Cesar Vernaza (right).

Two men were confirmed to have been killed while five others were transported to hospital with serious injuries. The deceased were identified as 25-year-old Shaquan Quashie and 20-year-old Cesar Vernaza. Toronto police said both victims were targeted and knew each other, but it is still unknown if they were among the gunmen. Among the injured was a young woman who got shot in the neck.

== Suspects ==
The police said that they were looking for two suspected related to this incident. An unconfirmed video posted to social media showed a person being arrested in relation to the shooting. On August 6th, Toronto Police announced that they arrested the two suspects in the shooting and identified them as 18-year-old Jessiah Massaro-Gill and 18-year-old Lewis Downey. They were charged with two counts of first-degree murder and five counts of attempted murder in relation to the shooting. Downey is facing several other charges, including unauthorized possession of a restricted firearm and two counts of possession of a Schedule 1 substance for the purpose of trafficking. Massaro-Gill's other charges include six counts of possession of a Schedule 1 substance for the purpose of trafficking and two counts of possession of an unauthorized firearm.

== Aftermath ==
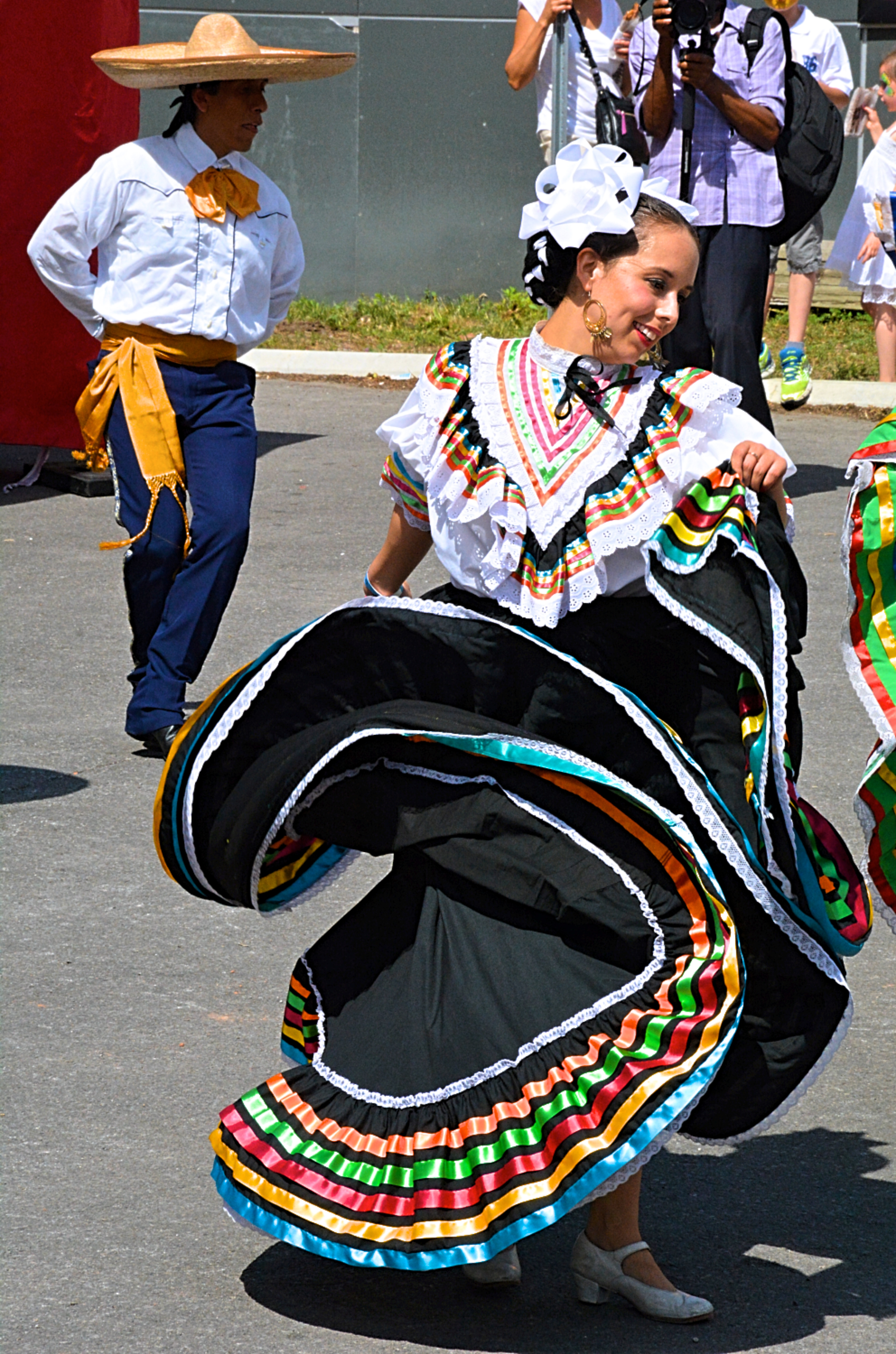
Salsa on St. Clair festival in 2016

The final day of the festival was cancelled. A crowd of around 50 people held a candlelight vigil outside of a church in the St. Clair West neighbourhood. The shooting sparked security concerns across the country. Toronto police echoed calls for gun control. Organizers of the 2026 Taste of the Danforth festival said that it would be safe to attend.

== Reactions ==
Prime Minister Mark Carney posted on X that he was "horrified" by the shooting, thanked first responders and offered prayers for the families of the victims and the critically injured. Conservative leader Pierre Poilievre said he was "shocked" to hear about the shooting and offered prayers for the victims and the injured. Ontario Premier Doug Ford said he was "devastated" by the shooting and said his thoughts were with the victims, their families and everyone affected. Toronto mayor Olivia Chow called the shooting a "reckless, irresponsible act of violence" and said she is "deeply disturbed". Area councillor Michael Colle called the shooting "disgusting". The CN Tower dimmed its lights at the top of every hour in honour of the victims.

The organizers of the festival said they are prepared to walk away from the festival unless the City of Toronto strengthens security. The Hillcrest Village Business Improvement Area voted to discontinue its sponsorship of the annual street festival following the fatal shooting.
