= 2025 Société de transport de Montréal strikes =

Labor dispute in Montreal, Canada

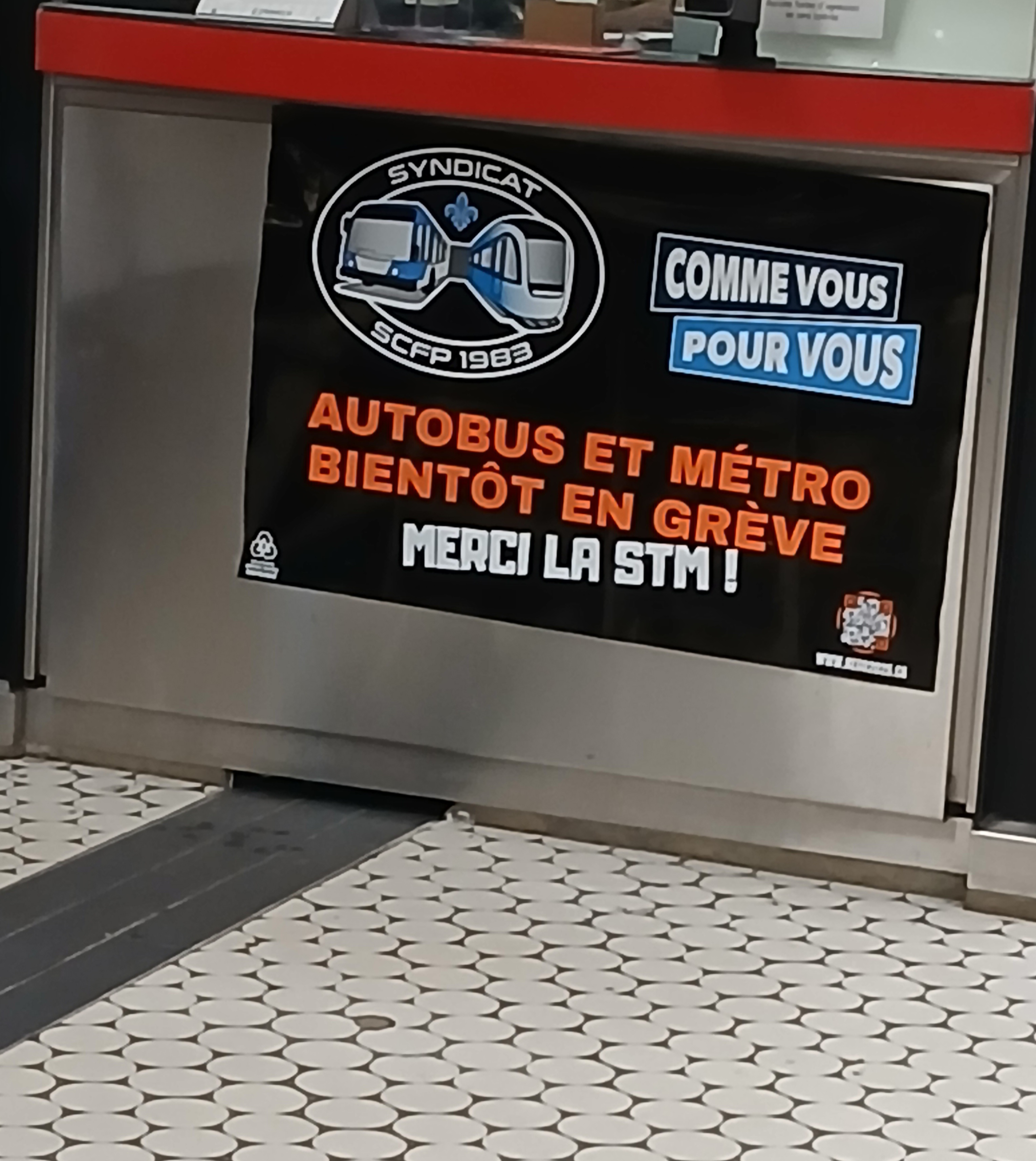
- Banner for the strike at Peel metro station: "Like you, for you / Bus and metro on strike soon / Thank you STM!"
- Date: June 2025 - April 2026
- Location: Montreal
- Caused by: Contractual dispute
- Status: Resolved
- Result: New contract ratified

Parties
Confédération des syndicats nationaux (CSN) Canadian Union of Public Employees (CUPE / SCFP)	Société de transport de Montréal (STM)

The 2025 Société de transport de Montréal strikes refer to a series of strikes of 2,400 maintenance workers & 4,500 Bus/Metro operators and station agents employed by the Société de transport de Montréal (STM) represented by Confédération des syndicats nationaux (CSN) and Canadian Union of Public Employees (CUPE / SCFP) respectively.

The first round of strikes from the maintenance workers lasted from June 9 to June 17, 2025. It affected transit, including buses and the Montreal Metro. However, adaptive transport ran unaffected.

A second strike took place from September 22 to October 5. During this time, the bus and metro operated as usual during peak hours and a late-night block, and did not run during off-peak hours on scheduled days. Adaptive transport was fully operational at all times during the strike.

Strikes resumed on November 1 which were intended to last for 4 weeks at a rush hour and late-night schedule only. On November 11, the CSN announced a suspension of the strike which came into effect the next day at 6am. After labor negotiations stalled, the CSN submitted a strike notice on 9 December, before delaying their strike two days because the labour board of Montreal declared the notice non-compliant, which lasted until 11 January.

In April 2026, a new agreement was ratified by the workers with 86% voting in favour of the new contract.

== Background ==
The collective bargaining agreement expired in January 2025 and negotiations did not produce a new contract.
