= Aileen H. Cowan =

Canadian painter and sculptor (1926–2024)

- Born: Helen Aileen Hooper Cowan; June 11, 1926; Windsor, Ontario, Canada
- Died: December 3, 2024 (aged 98); Toronto, Ontario, Canada
- Education: University of Toronto; Queen's University at Kingston
- Awards: Augusta Kopmanis Memorial Award (1980)

Helen Aileen Hooper Cowan (June 11, 1926 – December 3, 2024) was a Canadian painter and sculptor.

== Biography ==
Cowan was born in Windsor, Ontario, and received a bachelor's degree from the University of Toronto. She undertook graduate work both there and at Queen's University at Kingston. She exhibited widely both in Canada and abroad, both alone and in groups, and her work is represented in collections such as those of the Robert McLaughlin Gallery and the University of Western Ontario. Her awards include the Augusta Kopmanis Memorial Award, which she received in 1980. Cowan was a member of the Sculptors Society of Canada from 1986, and served as the organization's president from 1983 until 1985.

Cowan died at an assisted living facility in Toronto on December 3, 2024, at the age of 98.
