= Hannah Henry =

Canadian triathlete (1999–2026)

Personal information
- Born: October 27, 1999 Victoria, British Columbia, Canada
- Died: February 8, 2026 (aged 26) Phoenix, Arizona, U.S.
- Occupation: Triathlete
- Years active: 2017–2026

Hannah Henry (October 27, 1999 – February 8, 2026) was a Canadian triathlete who won back-to-back USA Triathlon Collegiate National Championships in 2017 and 2018 while competing for Arizona State University. She represented Canada internationally, including at the 2019 Pan American Games, where she won a silver medal in the mixed relay.

== Early life ==
Hannah Henry was born on October 27, 1999, in Victoria, British Columbia. She began competing in triathlon at the age of nine. She swam competitively before focusing primarily on triathlon in her early teens.

She attended Mount Douglas Secondary School before moving to Arizona to train and compete at the collegiate level. Henry had two sisters, Holly and Heidi, who also competed in triathlon.

== Collegiate career ==
Henry competed for the Arizona State Sun Devils in NCAA triathlon. She won back-to-back individual titles at the USA Triathlon Collegiate National Championships in 2017 and 2018, contributing to Arizona State’s team championships. She was named the 2017–18 USA Triathlon Division I Freshman of the Year and earned All-American honours.

Henry graduated from Arizona State University in 2021 with a Bachelor of Science in business entrepreneurship and later earned a Master of Global Management degree in 2023.

== International career ==
Henry represented British Columbia at the 2017 Canada Summer Games, winning a silver medal in the individual event and gold medals in the women’s 3x relay and mixed relay events.

In 2019, she made her debut at the ITU World Cup level, finishing 19th at the 2019 Chengdu ITU Triathlon World Cup. She also represented Canada at the 2019 Pan American Games in Lima, Peru, winning a silver medal in the mixed relay.

== Death ==
Henry died on February 8, 2026, in Phoenix, Arizona, while on a training ride, when her bicycle was struck by a driver in a designated bike lane. The driver was subsequently charged in connection with the incident.

== Major results ==
- 2017, 2018 – USA Triathlon Collegiate National Champion
- 2017 Canada Summer Games – Silver (individual), Gold (women’s 3x relay), Gold (mixed relay)
- 2019 Pan American Games – Silver medal (mixed relay)
- 2019 Chengdu ITU Triathlon World Cup – 19th
