= James R. Gibson =

Canadian historian and geographer (1935–2026)

- Born: James Ronald Gibson; April 25, 1935; Chilliwack, British Columbia, Canada
- Died: May 29, 2026 (aged 91); Thornhill, Ontario, Canada
- Education: University of Oregon, University of Wisconsin-Madison
- Occupations: Historian; Geographer

James Ronald Gibson (April 25, 1935 – May 29, 2026) was a Canadian historian and geographer, who wrote and published extensively on Siberia, the Northwest Coast of America and on Alaska's and California's Russian history.

== Early life and career ==
Gibson was born on April 25, 1935 in Chilliwack, British Columbia, where he was also raised. He first studied at the University of British Columbia, where he earned a B.A.in 1959. He pursued further studies at the University of Oregon, earning an M.A. there in 1962, and completed his studies at the University of Wisconsin-Madison, where he earned a Ph.D. in 1967. After his studies, he worked as a professor of historical geography of Russia at York University from 1966 to 1996.

He studied the Russian language during the 1960s, the height of the Cold War. This enabled him to work in the Soviet archives, where he obtained many manuscripts which he subsequently translated into English. His book Otter Skins, Boston Ships, and China Goods: The Maritime Fur Trade of the Northwest Coast, 1785–1841 (McGill-Queen's University Press, revised 2024), earned him the Lieutenant Governor's Medal for B.C. History for 1992.

Gibson was a visiting scholar in Japan, where at Hokkaido University there is a 2500-item James R. Gibson Library, and also in New Zealand, and Hawaii. In 1972, he received a Guggenheim Fellowship, and in 1989, he was named a Fellow of the Royal Society of Canada.

== Personal life and death ==
Gibson met his wife-to-be, Gail, in Madison, Wisconsin, and got married in June of 1962. They had two children and one grandchild. He died on May 29, 2026, at the age of 91.

== Works ==
=== Monographs ===
- Feeding the Russian Fur Trade: Provisionment of the Okhotsk Seaboard and the Kamchatka Peninsula, 1639–1856. Madison: University of Wisconsin Press. 1969. pp. xix, 337. ISBN 978-029-905-233-1.
- The Significance of Siberia to Tsarist Russia. Toronto: York University. 1972.
- Imperial Russia in Frontier America: The Changing Geography of Supply of Russian America, 1784–1867. New York: Oxford University Press. 1976. pp. x, 257. ISBN 978-019-501-875-2.
- Farming the Frontier: The Agricultural Opening of the Oregon Country, 1786-1846. University of Washington Press. 1985. p. 265. ISBN 9780295962979.
- Otter Skins, Boston Ships, and China Goods: The Maritime Fur Trade of the Northwest Coast, 1785–1841. Montreal, Quebec: McGill-Queen’s University Press. 2024 [1992]. ISBN 978-077-350-829-3.
- The Lifeline of the Oregon Country: the Fraser-Columbia Brigade System, 1811–47. Vancouver: University of British Columbia Press. 1997. pp. xi, 292. ISBN 077-480-642-7.
- "Opposition on the Coast". The Hudson's Bay Company, American coasters, the Russian-American Company, and Native traders on the Northwest Coast, 1825–1846. Toronto: Publications of the Champlain Society. 2019. pp. xvii, 295. ISBN 9780772764416.
- Hungry and Starving: Voices of the Great Soviet Famine, 1928–1934. Montreal, Quebec: McGill-Queen’s University Press. 2024. p. 496. ISBN 978-022-802-001-1.

=== Books edited ===
- Essays on the History of Russian Cartography, 16th to 19th Centuries. Translated by James R. Gibson. Henry W. Castner (Introduction). Toronto: University of Toronto Press. 1975. p. 145.
- European Settlement and Development in North America: In Honour and Memory of Andrew Hill Clark. University of Toronto Press. 1978. p. 230. ISBN 9780712908962.
- James R. Gibson, ed. (1993). Canada: Geographical Interpretations: Essays in Honour of John Warkentin. Geography Department, Atkinson College, York University. p. 276. ISBN 9781550141344.
- Gibson, James R., ed. (2013). California Through Russian Eyes, 1806–1848. Translated by Gibson, James R. Norman, Oklahoma: University of Oklahoma Press. p. 506. ISBN 978-0806150994.
- Fort Simpson Post Journals 1834–1843 — Volume One. [Independently published]. 2023. p. 399. ISBN 9798795846576.

=== Collaborations ===
- Castner, Henry W.; Gibson, James R. (1975). Essays on the History of Russian Cartography, 16th to 19th Centuries. Toronto: B. V. Gutsell, Dept. of Geography, York University cop. pp. xii, 145. ISSN 0317-7173.
- Kabuzan, Vladimir Maksimovich, Gibson, James R. (1997). Some Materials for the Study of the Historical Geography of Russia of the 18th and Early 19th Centuries in the Archives and Libraries of Moscow and St. Petersburg. Toronto: Dept. of Geography, York University. pp. iv, 40. ISBN 155-014-330-1.
- Gibson, James R., Истомин, А. А; Тишков, В. А. (2005). Россия в Калифорнии: русские документы о колонии Росс и российско-калифорнийских связях: в двух томах [‘Russia in California: Russian Documents on the Colony of Ross and the Russo-Californian relations; in two volumes’]. Moscow: Nauka. ISBN 5-02-008901-X.
- Gibson, James R.; Istomin, Alexei A., eds. (2014). Russian California, 1806–1860: a History in Documents. Translated by James R. Gibson. Valery A. Tishkov (assistance). London: Routledge for the Hakluyt Society. pp. 547 + 640. ISBN 978-1-908-14508-6.

== Articles ==
- The Canadian and Russian Northlands. Critical Contrasts. Toronto: York University (Toronto, Ont.). Dept. of Geography. 1972. p. 27.
- "A Russian Orthodox Priest in Mexican California". The Californians. 9 (6). Grizzly Bear Publications. 1992.
- Russian imperial expansion, 1550s–1880s. A Comparative Overview. Toronto: York University (Toronto, Ont.). Dept. of Geography. 2000. p. 12.
