= Robin Brownlee =

Canadian journalist (1958–2024)

- Born: 16 August 1958
- Died: 11 January 2024 (aged 65)
- Occupations: Ice hockey journalist, radio host

Robin Brownlee (16 August 1958 – 11 January 2024) was a Canadian ice hockey journalist and radio host. He covered the Edmonton Oilers of the National Hockey League for the Edmonton Journal and the Edmonton Sun from 1989 to 2007 and later for Canadian Press and NHL.com. He appeared regularly on TSN 1260 sports radio as co-host of the Jason Gregor Show from 2009 to 2018, and rejoined Gregor as radio co-host when Sports 1440 started broadcasting in September 2023. Brownlee wrote for the Edmonton Journal from 1989 to 2000, then at the Edmonton Sun from December 2000 until January 2007, as that newspaper's senior hockey writer, before moving to write for OilersNation in 2007. In addition, starting in 2019, he co-hosted the weekly podcast The Outsiders, with Bryan Griffiths.

Brownlee died on 11 January 2024, at the age of 65.
