= Stéphane-Albert Boulais =

Canadian writer and film critic (1949–2026)

- Born: 17 June 1949; Maniwaki, Quebec, Canada
- Died: 1 June 2026 (aged 76)
- Education: University of Ottawa; Université Laval
- Occupations: Writer; Film critic

Stéphane-Albert Boulais (17 June 1949 – 1 June 2026) was a Canadian writer and film critic.

Boulais notably received the 2003 Grand prix d'excellence de la Fondation du Casino du Lac-Leamy and served as honorary president of the Salon du livre de l'Outaouais.

Boulais died on 1 June 2026, at the age of 76.

== Publications ==
=== Monographies ===
- Le Cinéma vécu de l'intérieur : Mon expérience avec Pierre Perrault (1988)
- Le Temps des baisers (1999)
- Biographier Pierre Perrault (1999)
- Je t'aime, Abigail! (1999)
- Blisse : le Cycle des amoureuses (2000)
- Blisse : le Cycle de l’Instruit (2000)
- Blisse : le Cycle des conteurs (2001)
- Mon Amoroso (2001)
- Vieille Couvarte (2002)
- La Biographie vue de l’intérieur (2004)
- La Trilogie de Lo (2006)

=== Articles ===
- "Gamamissi" (1992)
- "L'Infirme Junius" (1994)
- "La Louve des îles" (1995)
- "Enfance" (1997)
- "Ma langue d'enfant" (2000)
- "Aurore boréale ou anatomie du désir" (2004)

=== Radio writings ===
- Gamamissi (1992)
- Barrueco (1993)
- L'Infirme Junius (1996)
- Laura du Blisse (2001)
- Fortuna (2003)

=== Other works ===
- Premiers baisers (1998)
- Hull est une jeune femme (2000)
- Même notre colère est une paix (2001)
- Nos bouches : métamorphoses (2003)
- Le Salon des salons (2004)
- LiliJuan (2005)
- F, ma guitare, Elle, mon amour (2006)
