= Pete Woolley =

Canadian football player (1929–2024)

Profile
- Positions: Guard, Tackle

Personal information
- Born: July 12, 1929; Hamilton, Ontario, Canada
- Died: April 21, 2024 (aged 94)
- Listed height: 5 ft 11 in (1.80 m)
- Listed weight: 205 lb (93 kg)

Career history
- 1953–1956: Hamilton Tiger-Cats

Awards and highlights
- Grey Cup champion (1953)

Peter Allan Woolley (July 12, 1929 – April 21, 2024) was a Canadian professional football player who played for the Hamilton Tiger-Cats. He won the Grey Cup with them in 1953. Woolley died on April 21, 2024, at the age of 94.
