= Paul-André Cadieux =

Canadian ice hockey player and coach (1947–2024)

- Born: June 25, 1947; Ottawa, Ontario, Canada
- Died: September 16, 2024 (aged 77)
- Height: 5 ft 9 in (175 cm)
- Weight: 177 lb (80 kg; 12 st 9 lb)
- Position: Defence
- Shot: Left
- Played for: SC Bern; HC Davos; EHC Chur; HC Fribourg-Gottéron; SCL Tigers; Genève-Servette HC
- National team: Switzerland
- Playing career: 1970–1990

Paul-Andre Cadieux (June 25, 1947 – September 16, 2024) was a Canadian professional ice hockey defenceman and later player-coach, coach and sports director. He was the father of ice hockey player Jan Cadieux.

Born in Ottawa, Ontario, Canada, Cadieux studied sports science at the University of Ottawa and came to Switzerland to play for SC Bern in 1970. He stayed in the Swiss hockey scene ever afterwards.

Cadieux died on September 16, 2024, at the age of 77.

Team	Position
SC Bern	Player, player-coach
HC Davos	Player, player-coach
EHC Chur	Player, player-coach
HC Fribourg-Gottéron	Player, player-coach, coach
SCL Tigers	Player, coach
EHC Biel	Coach
Genève-Servette HC	Player, player-coach, coach, sports director
HC Martigny	Coach, sports director
EHC Basel	Coach, sports director
HC Ajoie	Coach
HC La Chaux-de-Fonds	Coach
HC Lausanne	Sports director

== Achievements ==
- 1974 – NLA Champion with SC Bern
- 1975 – NLA Champion with SC Bern
- 1977 – NLA Champion with SC Bern
