= Serge Laprade =

Canadian broadcaster (1942–2024)

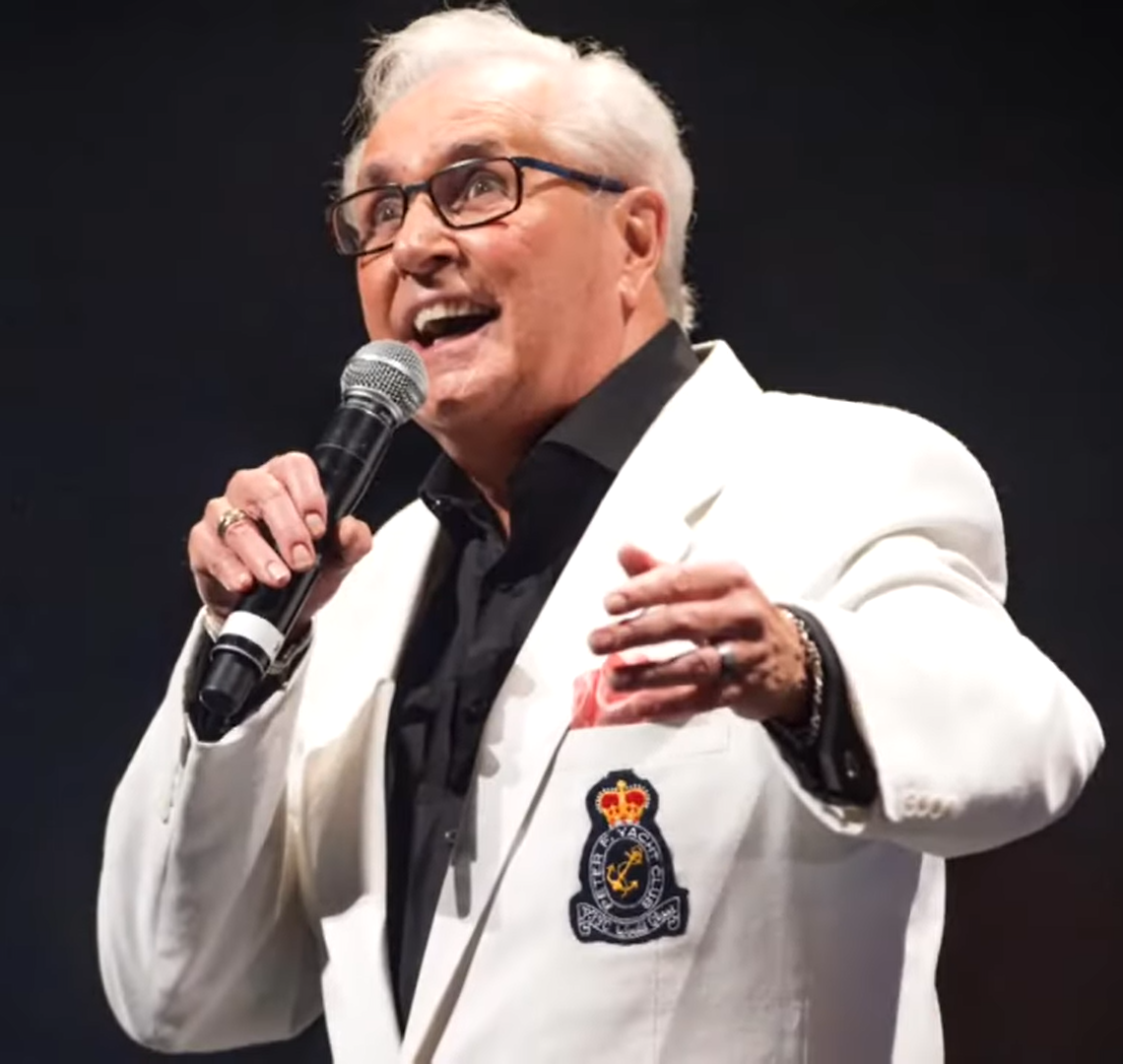
- Born: January 13, 1941; Montreal, Quebec, Canada
- Died: January 17, 2024 (aged 83); La Prairie, Quebec, Canada
- Occupations: Singer, radio and television host

Serge Laprade (January 13, 1941 – January 17, 2024) was a Canadian singer and host on a number of Quebec radio and television stations.

== Career ==
After his secondary education, he completed his university studies at Université de Montréal majoring in social science while studying singing and theatre acting. In 1962 and 1963, he worked at the news service of radio station CJMS. During the same period, he took part in a number of music and entertainment shows as an amateur singer and caught the attention of a number of producers. In the 1960s, he recorded a number of successful singles and hosted his first television broadcasts. In 1964, he was named "male discovery of the year" at the Gala des artistes in Quebec.

Laprade also led a successful career as a radio host of radio entertainment shows on a number of radio stations, notably CKVL, CKAC, CKLM, CBF, CJMS and CFGL and at the Radio-Canada television network, where he notably hosted the game show Le travail à la chaîne from 1972 to 1979. He also hosted shows in Télé-Métropole and Télévision Quatre-Saisons (TQS). From 1971 to 1973, he was director of programming at CKLM. He was also involved in charity telethons between 1977 and 1988 for the Canadian Cerebral Palsy Association.

During the 1988 Canadian Federal elections, he ran unsuccessfully as a candidate of the Liberal Party of Canada in the riding of Hochelaga—Maisonneuve. In 2003, he appeared in the film 100% bio directed by Claude Fortin and in 2011-2012, he made his "farewell tour" on the occasion of his 50-year music career.

His discography includes a dozen albums and almost 40 hit singles. He acted in three plays, Vacances pour Jessica in 1969 and Madam Idora in 1971 both with director Henri Norbert and in 1989 in Le grand oui, an adaptation of Ciel de lit with director Marie-Michelle Desrosiers.

Laprade died from prostate cancer in La Prairie, Quebec, on January 17, 2024, at the age of 83.

== Filmography ==
- 1970: Initiation
- 2003: 100% bio as actor and screenwriter
- 2008: Cul-de-Sac as Costa

== Theatre ==
- 1969: Vacances pour Jessica
- 1971: Madam Idora
- 1989: Le grand oui
