= Sheila Kussner =

Canadian philanthropist (1932/1933–2024)

Sheila Kussner (1932/1933 – August 6, 2024) was a Canadian philanthropist who founded the cancer support program Hope & Cope in 1981.

== Life and career ==
Sheila Golden Kussner was invested as a member of the Order of Canada on April 11, 1984. She was promoted to be an officer of the order on November 16, 1995.

McGill University awarded Kussner an honorary doctorate in 1990.

Kussner died on August 6, 2024, at the age of 91.
