= Evan Hammond =

Canadian radio show host (1980–2026)

Evan Hammond (May 14, 1980 – January 2, 2026) was a Canadian morning radio show host, ice hockey play-by-play broadcaster, and blogger.

== Life and career ==
Hammond was born in Flin Flon, Manitoba. He was the morning show host at 93.3 The Peak in Port Alberni, British Columbia, and was the radio play-by-play voice of the Alberni Valley Bulldogs of the British Columbia Hockey League. He died from a stroke on January 2, 2026, at the age of 45.
