= Canada Strong Fund =

Sovereign wealth fund

- Type: Sovereign wealth fund
- Industry: Institutional investor
- Founded: 27 April 2026; 6 months ago
- Headquarters: Ottawa, Canada
- Key people: Karen Karniol-Tambour (CEO)
- Owner: Government of Canada

The Canada Strong Fund (CSF) (French: Le Fonds pour un Canada fort) is a proposed sovereign wealth fund to be operated as a Crown corporation in Canada, with the goal to invest funds on behalf of the Government of Canada.

== History ==
On 27 April 2026, Prime Minister Mark Carney announced a $25 billion public fund designed to bankroll major projects. It is Canada's first such fund at a national-federal level.

It is the fourth major public investment vehicle to be created by the Liberal Party of Canada, with the Trudeau government launching the $35B Canada Infrastructure Bank, the $15B Clean Growth Fund and the $10B Indigenous Loan Guarantee Program in the past decade. The province of Alberta previously created, in 1976, the Alberta Heritage Savings Trust Fund, which has grown to be worth over $31 billion, as of 2025. Similarly, La Caisse successfully supported entrepreneurs in the province of Quebec since 1965, offering an alternative to Norway's strategy of investing internationally.

== Investments and strategy ==
The new fund will provide an “easy and accessible” way for Canadians to invest alongside the private sector. Finance Minister François-Philippe Champagne noted, "[Canada] is one of the only two countries in the G7 with a AAA credit rating... Canada can borrow on the international market at some of the lowest rates that you could see." The fund will differ from previous funds by being focused on equity as opposed to loans and debt, and providing more opportunity for long-term returns on investment.

The Canadian government will seed the fund with a $25 billion investment spread over three years, partnering with domestic and foreign private sector investors to grow the fund and generate long-term returns, with a focus on projects in energy, critical minerals, agriculture and infrastructure.

== Management ==
The fund will be managed by a new Crown corporation led by a CEO and an independent board of directors at arms length from the government.
