= Gerry Kowalsky =

Canadian automobile salesman (1922–2026)

- Born: Gerald John Kowalsky; March 19, 1922; Doon, Ontario, Canada
- Died: October 12, 2026 (aged 104)
- Occupation: Automobile salesman
- Spouse: Amelia (m. 1942; died 1992)
- Military career
- Allegiance: Canada
- Branch: Canadian Army
- Unit: Royal Canadian Army Service Corps
- Conflicts: World War II

Gerald John Kowalsky (March 19, 1922 – October 12, 2026) was a Canadian automobile salesman, who was known for working in the car sales industry for over 60 years.

== Early life ==
Kowalsky was born in Doon, Ontario on March 19, 1922.

== Career ==
At age 19, Kowalsky enlisted in the Royal Canadian Army Service Corps of the Canadian Army during World War II and served for four and a half years.

After his military service, Kowalsky worked in the construction trade for ten years.

In 1957, he became a salesman at Kaye Ford, a dealership for Ford Motor Company in Kitchener, Ontario and worked there for 23 years.

In 1986, Kowalsky started working at Olympic Honda, a Honda dealership in Guelph, where he continued to work into the 2020s.

== Personal life and death ==
Gerry Kowalsky married a woman named Amelia in 1942. She died in 1992. Kowalsky died on October 12, 2026, at the age of 104.
