= Raymond Boulanger =

Canadian bush pilot and drug trafficker (1948–2024)

- Born: John Raymond Boulanger; 1948; Rimouski, Quebec, Canada
- Died: 19 March 2024 (aged 76); Montreal, Quebec, Canada
- Occupation(s): Bush pilot Drug trafficker

John Raymond Boulanger (1948 – 19 March 2024) was a Canadian bush pilot and drug trafficker.

Boulanger trafficked cocaine on behalf of Pablo Escobar and the Medellín Cartel, the only known person from Quebec to have done so.

== Biography ==
Born in Rimouski in 1948, Boulanger began working with the Colombians in the 1970s. He trained numerous pilots and built landing strips in the jungle. During the 1980s, he worked with the Central Intelligence Agency. In November 1992, he was arrested during one of the largest drug imports to Canada. He landed his plane, a Convair 580, on a former military airstrip in Haute-Mauricie with 4300 kilograms of cocaine. He was sentenced to 23 years in prison and was released on parole in 2013. While in prison, he wrote two books, in 1998 and in 2000. In 2019, he was the subject of a docuseries titled "Le dernier vol de Raymond Boulanger", hosted by Patrick Huard.

Boulanger died from cancer in Montreal on 19 March 2024, at the age of 76.
