= Paul Dwayne =

Canadian singer-songwriter (1964–2024)

Paul Després (February 27, 1964 – August 26, 2024), known by the stage name Paul Dwayne, was a Canadian country singer-songwriter who was a key figure in Acadian musical culture.

== Biography ==
A native of Bouctouche, New Brunswick, he began performing locally as a teenager, initially singing in English before switching to French. He competed in the 1992 Bud Country Talent Search, finishing in second place behind Sheila Deck.

He released his debut album Mon petit chenou in 1998, receiving nominations for Country Artist of the Year and Country Album of the Year at the 1999 FrancoFête. He received an East Coast Music Award nomination for Francophone Artist of the Year in 2001.

He performed primarily original material in French, although he also recorded one album of covers of classic English country songs. He released seven albums between 1998 and 2011; and continued to perform occasional shows at music festivals in the Atlantic Canada region in the 2010s.

Dwayne died on August 26, 2024, at the age of 60. His final performance before his death was a private show at a wedding. His son, James Després, is also a country singer.

== Discography ==
- Mon petit chenou - 1998
- Always Country - 2000
- Ensemble pour toujours - 2000
- Noël avec mes amis - 2001
- Ma p'tite guitare - 2003
- Je t'aime - 2006
- Mon Dodge Truck - 2011
