= Annette Saint-Pierre =

Canadian educator, writer and publisher (1925–2026)

Annette Saint-Pierre, CM (29 August 1925 – 1 September 2026) was a Canadian educator, writer and publisher.

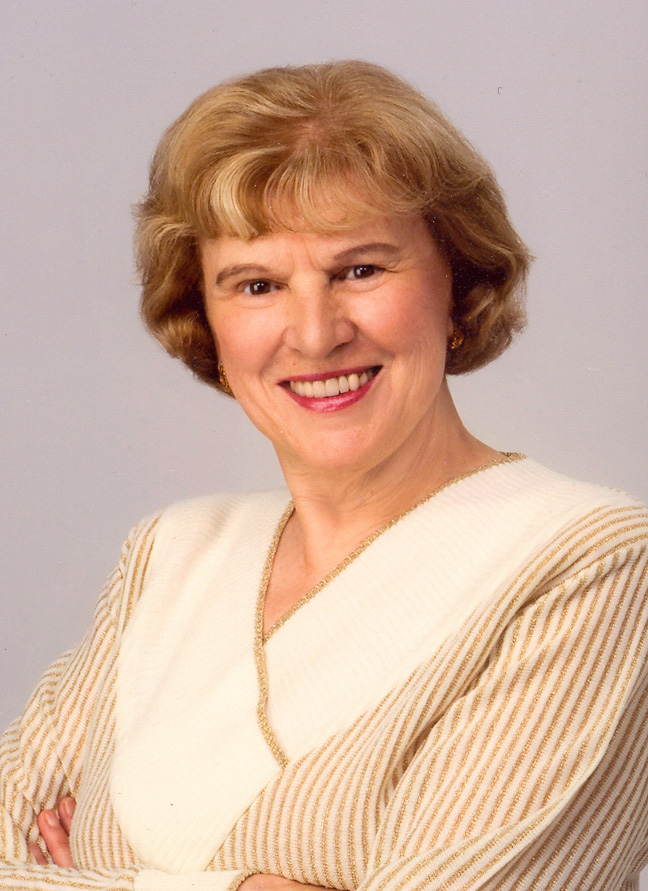
Annette Saint-Pierre

== Life and career ==
Saint-Pierre was born in Saint-Germain-de-Grantham, Quebec on 29 August 1925. She was educated at the Scolasticat Saint-Joseph in Saint-Hyacinthe and the University of Ottawa. Between 1950 and 1970, Saint-Pierre taught elementary and high school in Manitoba. In 1970, she became a professor of Canadian literature at Collège universitaire de Saint-Boniface and initiated the first university-level course in Canadian literature in western Canada.

In 1978, Saint-Pierre was a founding member of the Centre d'études franco-canadiennes de l'Ouest. In 1984, she was a director for the Regroupement des centres d'études au Canada. She was also a founding member of the first two Franco-Manitoban publishing houses, Éditions du Blé and Éditions des Plaines.

She played a crucial role in preserving the birthplace of Gabrielle Roy, now a museum. In 2004, she was named to the Order of Canada.

Saint-Pierre turned 100 on 29 August 2025 and died on 1 September 2026, three days after her 101st birthday.

== Selected works ==
=== Autobiography ===
- J'ai fait ma chance (2010)

=== Essays ===
- Au pays de Gabrielle Roy (2005)
- Gabrielle Roy, sous le signe du rêve (1975)

=== Novels ===
- La fille bègue, (1982, re-released in 2012)
- Sans bon sang, (1987)
- Coups de vent, (1990)
- À la dérive, (2002)

=== Theatre ===
- Le rideau se lève au Manitoba (1980)
