= Darrel Janz =

Canadian broadcast journalist (1941–2024)

- Born: 1941; Saskatchewan, Canada
- Died: November 2, 2024 (aged 83)
- Occupation: Broadcast journalist

Darrel Janz (1941 – November 2, 2024) was a Canadian broadcast journalist.

== Life and career ==
Born in Saskatchewan, Janz went on to graduate from teacher's college in 1961.

Janz's first broadcasting position came at CFAM Radio in Altona, Manitoba in 1961. His career saw his move between Manitoba, Ontario, Quebec, and Alberta, and he provided coverage of the October Crisis in 1970. He became an anchor with CFCN (now part of CTV) in 1973, continuing in the position until 2013. Among the highlights of his career were covering the 1984 Summer Olympics in Los Angeles and the 1988 Winter Olympics in Calgary.

Janz taught broadcast journalism at Southern Alberta Institute of Technology for 11 years and taught at Mount Royal College for another 15.

In 2006, Janz was recognized with a lifetime achievement award from Radio Television Digital News Association of Canada (RTDNA), one of two recipients that year from the prairie region.

In 2013, he was the inaugural inductee to the Western Association of Broadcasters' Broadcast Hall of Fame. That year, the city of Calgary recognized him with a Community Achievement Award for his community advocacy. Following his retirement from his anchor position, Janz continued with CTV and hosted the weekly show Inspired. He later hosted a weekly show on Yes TV.

Janz died on the morning of November 2, 2024, at the age of 83.
