= Jacques Tremblay =

Canadian politician (1942–2026)

Jacques Tremblay (8 February 1942 – 2 February 2026) was a Canadian politician.

== Life and career ==
Tremblay was born in Iberville, Quebec on 8 February 1942. He was elected to the National Assembly of Quebec for the Quebec Liberal Party in the Iberville electoral district. Tremblay served one term, and did not run in the 1989 election. He died on 2 February 2026, at the age of 83.
