= André Vanasse =

Canadian writer (1942–2026)

- Vanasse in 2012
- Born: March 6, 1942; Montreal, Quebec, Canada
- Died: February 26, 2026 (aged 83)
- Education: University of Vincennes in Saint-Denis
- Occupation: Writer

André Vanasse (March 6, 1942 – February 26, 2026) was a Canadian writer. A member of the Académie des lettres du Québec, he was nominated for a Governor General's Award in the category French-language children's literature for the novel Des Millions pour une chanson.

In 2017, he was awarded the Order of Canada for his recognition in promoting Quebec literature for over fifty years.

Vanasse died from complications of Alzheimer's disease on February 26, 2026, at the age of 83.
