= Franco Nuovo =

Canadian journalist and television presenter (1953–2026)

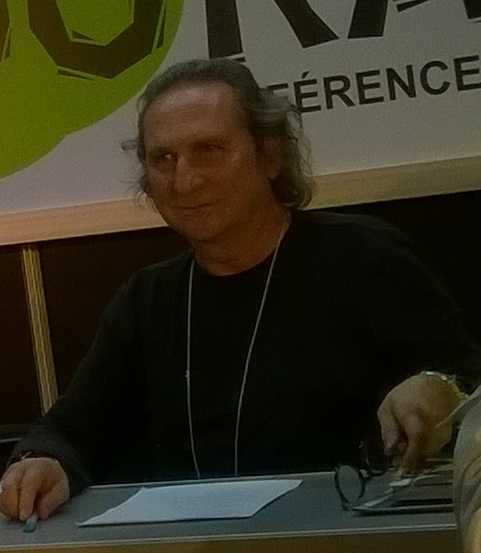
- Nuovo in 2017
- Born: 11 September 1953; Montreal, Quebec, Canada
- Died: 8 February 2026 (aged 72); Montreal, Quebec, Canada
- Education: Collège Stanislas de Montréal; Université de Montréal
- Occupations: Journalist; Television presenter

Franco Nuovo (11 September 1953 – 8 February 2026) was a Canadian journalist and television presenter.

== Life and career ==
After his studies at the Collège Stanislas de Montréal and the Université de Montréal, he was a longtime host of the Ici Radio-Canada Première show Je l'ai vu à la radio. From 1980 to 1986, he contributed to the magazine Québec-Rock and created a personal blog in 2009. From 2010 to 2011, he collaborated with the magazine Six dans la cité for ICI Radio-Canada Télé.

Nuovo died from a cardiac arrest on 8 February 2026, at the age of 72.
