= 2027 in Canada =

- Decades: 2000s; 2010s; 2020s
- See also: History of Canada; Timeline of Canadian history; List of years in Canada

The following is a list of events of the year 2027 in Canada, as well as events that are scheduled or predicted to take place during the year.

== Scheduled events ==
- December 26, 2026 – January 5 – 2027 World Junior Ice Hockey Championships
- August – September – 2027 FIVB Women's Volleyball World Cup in Canada and the United States

== Holidays ==
- January 1 – New Year's Day
- February 15 – Family Day
- March 26 – Good Friday
- May 24 – Victoria Day
- July 1 – Canada Day
- September 6 – Labour Day
- September 30 – National Day for Truth and Reconciliation
- October 11 – Thanksgiving Day
- November 11 – Remembrance Day
- December 25 – Christmas Day

== Art and Entertainment ==
- 2027 in Canadian music
- 2027 in Canadian television
- List of Canadian films of 2027
