= Constitution of Quebec =

Uncodified Canadian provincial constitution

The constitution of Quebec comprises a set of legal rules that arise from the following categories:

- The established provisions of the Clergy Endowments (Canada) Act 1791, also known as the Constitutional Act of 1791, pertaining mainly to Lower Canada (Quebec),
- The provisions of the British North America Act, 1840, also known as the Union Act 1840, that combined the provinces of upper and lower Canada into a single one, divided administratively as Canada West, and Canada East, respectively,
- The provisions of the Constitution Act, 1867 pertaining to the provinces of Canada in general and Quebec in particular;
- The organic laws regarding the distribution of powers of Quebec and the individual rights of persons: some fifteen Quebec laws, the main ones being An Act respecting the National Assembly, the Executive Power Act, the Election Act, the Referendum Act, the Charter of human rights and freedoms, the Charter of the French language, etc.;
- Most of the constitutional conventions concerned with the Crown of Canada, the Executive and the Parliament;
- The common law rules on the royal prerogative exercised by the Lieutenant Governor of Quebec;
- The constitutional case law of the courts of Quebec and the federal courts of Canada.

The Parliament of Quebec has the power to modify certain parts of Quebec's provincial constitution, while certain other parts can only be modified by going through the process of amending the Constitution of Canada.

== Fundamental text ==
Quebec has on several occasions discussed the possibility of gathering the scattered elements making up its constitution into a single document, but this idea has never moved forward. For example, during the 1969 National assizes of the Estates General of French Canada, the Quebec delegates adopted a resolution proposing that "Quebecers give themselves a written constitution." More than five decades later, this is yet to happen.

More recently, in his speech before the 2007 congress of the Association québécoise de droit constitutionnel, former Liberal Quebec Minister of Canadian Intergovernmental Affairs Benoît Pelletier stated:

"One of the first questions to answer naturally pertains to the content of a future fundamental text of law which Quebec could adopt. In 2001, the committee I chaired listed some possible elements for a consolidation of the fundamental rules governing Quebec. Generally speaking, our committee suggested that such a document could contain all the elements, currently dispersed, which form the material constitution of Quebec."

This "material constitution" could include, according to Pelletier:

- the set of constitutional and legislative provisions relating to the organization of the National Assembly and the Government of Quebec contained in sections 58–90 of the Constitution Act, 1867, in the National Assembly Act and in the Executive Act;
- the Quebec Charter of Human Rights and Freedoms;
- the Charter of the French Language;
- the Act respecting the Ministère des Relations internationales;
- the Election Act and the Referendum Act;
- some elements of the Act respecting the exercise of the fundamental rights and prerogatives of the Québec people and the Québec State;
- some motions and declarations adopted by the National Assembly that pertain to fundamental questions, such as the recognition of the rights of the Aboriginal peoples in Quebec.

On October 18, 2007, constitutional law professor and Parti Québécois opposition MNA Daniel Turp introduced Bill 196, a proposed Quebec Constitution, into the National Assembly. The bill did not pass the first reading.

In 2024, the Quebec Liberal Party proposed a Quebec Constitution. Later in that year, Coalition Avenir Québec (CAQ) Premier François Legault said he was open to the idea.

In 2025, Simon Jolin-Barrette was the minister who was drafting a Quebec constitution. On October 9, 2025, the CAQ government tabled a draft constitution to the National Assembly of Quebec. A 2025 poll found that 65% of Quebecers were in favour of a Quebec constitution and 22% opposed.

On June 11, 2026, the CAQ government under Christine Fréchette abandoned its constitution bill due to opposition from the Liberal Party and Québec Solidaire. The Parti Québécois also opposed the constitution bill.

=== Proposed measures ===
The CAQ bill aimed to affirm the constitutional existence of the Quebec nation, based on a unilateral amendment to the Constitution Act, 1867 made in 2022 recognizing the nation and French as the sole official language.

The bill would have given primacy to Quebec's fundamental laws, such as the Charter of the French Language (Bill 101 and its update via Bill 96), and would have prohibited the use of public funds to challenge them in court. The Act respecting the laicity of the State would have also been enshrined in the constitution. The text would also have protected abortion and medical assistance in dying. The bill proposed replacing the lieutenant governor with an "officer of Quebec" and creating a Constitutional Council for advice. Finally, the constitutional amendment process would have been a majority vote of the National Assembly.
