= 1P87 =

Russian collimator sight

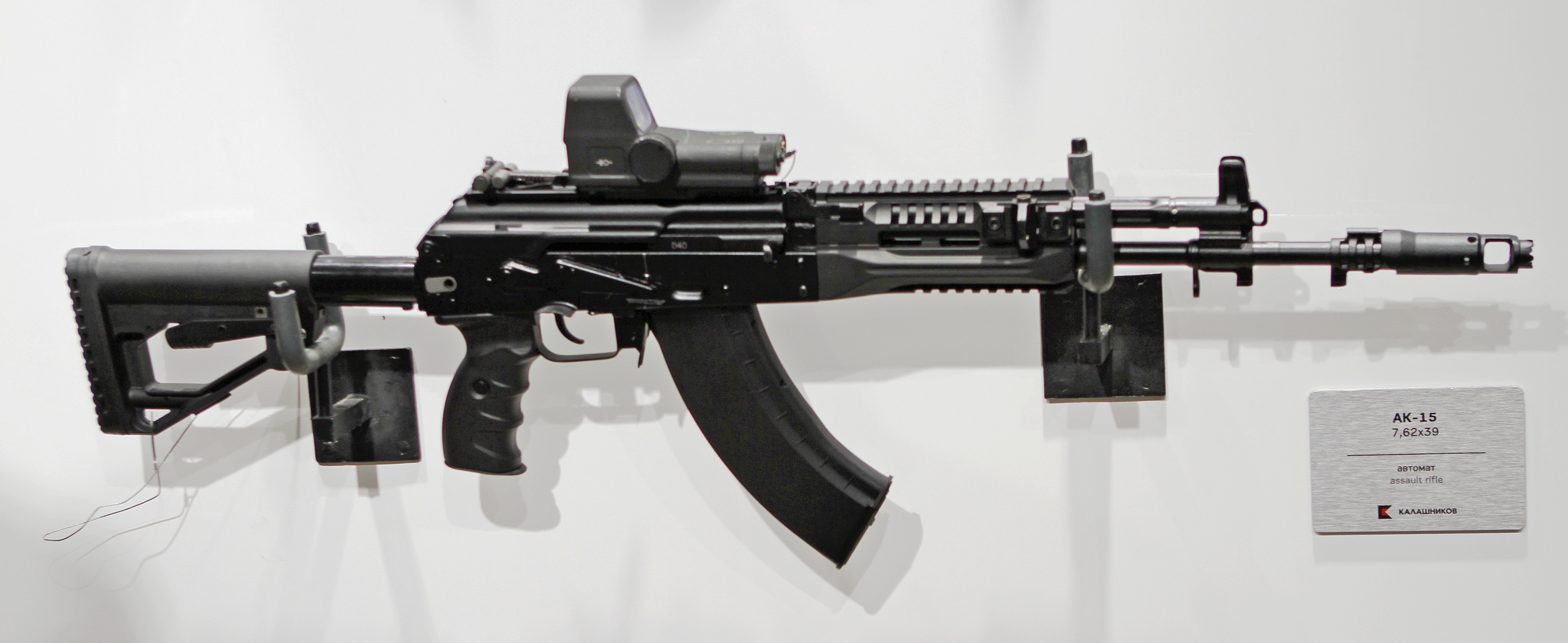
- A 1P87 sight mounted on an AK-15 at the Army-2020 exhibition
- Type: Collimator (reflex) sight
- Place of origin: Russia

Production history
- Designer: JSC "Zavod Yupiter"
- Designed: 2010s
- Manufacturer: JSC "Zavod Yupiter", Valday
- Produced: 2014–present
- Variants: Valday PK-120 (commercial)

Specifications
- Mass: 300 g (11 oz)
- Length: 135 mm (5.3 in)
- Width: 68 mm (2.7 in)
- Height: 72 mm (2.8 in)

The 1P87 (Russian: 1П87), sold on the civilian market as the Valday PK-120 (Russian: Валдай ПК-120), is a Russian 1× collimator (reflex) sight produced by JSC "Zavod Yupiter" in Valday, Novgorod Oblast. It was developed under the Ratnik program as the collimator element of the 1PN137 day-night sighting and observation complex, and was adopted under the GRAU index 1P87. The sight has been produced since 2014.

The sight uses a prismatic collimator scheme that projects the reticle into the same plane as the target, allowing aiming with both eyes open and giving a practically unlimited field of view. It is used on AK-12 and AK-15 rifles and other small arms with a Picatinny rail, and can be fitted to rifles with a side rail through an adapter. By 2022 it had become common in Russian line units, and a revised version with a modified lens housing had appeared.

== History ==
The Valday plant that produces the sight was founded in 1973 as an optical-instrument factory and became widely known for the lenses it made for Zenit cameras. After the dissolution of the Soviet Union the plant lost its state orders; it went bankrupt in 1999 and was bought by the Saint Petersburg holding LANK, whose owners stopped optical production in 2013. The enterprise later passed under the control of the Lytkarino Optical Glass Plant, part of the Shvabe Holding within Rostec, which retained the Yupiter name and its optical specialisation.

The 1P87 was developed as part of the Ratnik programme, whose experimental design work was completed in 2015. The day-night complex (DNPK) developed for Ratnik comprised the 1P87 collimator, the 1PN138 night monocular, the 1P90 3× magnifying tube and the 1K241 laser designator, together with mounts for the weapon and helmet. In comparative trials the Yupiter complex was judged the best of the entries, and after state trials the complex and its elements were recommended for adoption.

The sight entered production in 2014. According to a 2016 Russian reference compiling the manufacturer's manual and conference material, the 1P87 had by then been adopted under its GRAU index, but deliveries were effectively limited to troop trials with the new Ratnik rifles, and the military had serious complaints about its performance. The commercial version, the Valday PK-120 (factory index ЕКВД.201214.000), was sold alongside it; a 2014 price of 33,205 roubles was quoted, falling to 29,000 roubles in 2016.

By 2022 the 1P87 appeared to be in widespread use in the Russian military, including with line units, and photographs had appeared of the sight in Ukraine. A new version with a modified lens housing was introduced, apparently as a result of field experience or manufacturing changes; it is not clear whether it received a new designation.

== Design ==
The 1P87 is a 1× collimator sight with a prismatic optical scheme. Because the reticle is imaged at infinity and appears in the same plane as the target, the shooter can keep both eyes open, the field of view is not restricted by a tube, and the window has a light transmission of more than 80%, which the developers noted makes the sight usable together with a night monocular.

The manufacturer's data give a field of view of 10.5° with the eye 100 mm from the eyepiece, a reticle wavelength of 626 nm and a parallax-free range of 100–200 m. The sight has nine brightness settings and a mode for use with night-vision devices. Elevation and windage adjustment ranges are at least ±10 mils, with an adjustment step of 0.25 mil and a line-of-sight drift of no more than 0.3 mil across the range.

The sight is powered by a single 1.5 V AA battery. The manual quotes at least 100 hours of operation at the seventh brightness setting under normal conditions, while the developers claimed more than 1,000 hours at medium brightness; lithium cells are recommended at temperatures below −18 °C. The housing measures 135 mm × 68 mm × 72 mm (5.3 in × 2.7 in × 2.8 in) and weighs 300 g (11 oz) without the battery. It is rated for −40 to +50 °C, relative humidity up to 98% and pressures of 60–107.6 kPa, and is designed to survive 300 g single shocks, short immersion in water to a depth of 1 m and reversed battery polarity.

Three reticle patterns are described in the manual: a 60-arcminute ring with a 2-arcminute dot in the centre, the same ring with 15-arcminute horizontal and vertical ticks, and a 2-arcminute dot with 15-arcminute ticks. The ring is intended to speed up bringing the sight onto a target and to allow rough range estimation.

The sight mounts directly on a Picatinny rail; a side-rail adapter allows it to be used on AK-pattern rifles with the standard side mount. The modular DNPK concept allows the 1P90 3× magnifier or the 1PN138 night monocular to be mounted behind the collimator without re-zeroing. Yupiter also produced short and long side mounts for the sight, and a 3× magnifier designated ZT310.

== Service ==
The 1P87 was adopted as part of the Ratnik equipment set and is used on the AK-12 and AK-15, as well as on the AK-74M3 Ratnik upgrade of the AK-74M. It has also been photographed on other Russian small arms and in Ukraine during the 2022 invasion.

RussianOptics.net, which tested a military-pattern example, described the sight as reliable and holding zero, and rated it highly among Russian red-dot sights, while noting that the elevation adjustment is awkward to use and that the available mounts block the rifle's iron sights.

== See also ==
- Red dot sight
- Reflector sight
- Kobra sight
- 1P63 Obzor
- Ratnik (program)
