= List of botanical gardens in Russia =

Botanical gardens in Russia have collections consisting entirely of Russia native and endemic species; most have a collection that include plants from around the world. There are botanical gardens and arboreta in all states and territories of Russia, most are administered by local governments, some are privately owned.

- Botanical Garden of V.L. Komarov Botany Institute RAS (BIN), Saint Petersburg
- Botanic Garden of the Irkutsk State UniversityIrkutsk
- Botanical Garden of Tver State University
- Botanical Garden of Academy of Sciences, Moscow
- Botanical Garden of Moscow State University, Moscow
- Taganrog Botanical Garden, Taganrog
- Central Siberian Botanic Garden, Novosibirsk
- List of Botanical Gardens and Arboreta of Russia
- VILAR Botanical Garden, Moscow
- Southern Federal University's botanical garden, Rostov-on-Don
- Sechenov Botanical Garden, First Moscow State Medical University
