= NPZ =

NPZ may refer to:

- SBB-CFF-FFS RBDe 560, a Swiss push-pull trainset, generally known as the Neuer Pendelzug (New Commuter Train)
- Fujicolor Pro 800Z, a photographic film previously known as Fujicolor NPZ 800
- NPZ model, a mathematical model of marine ecosystem
- NPZ, music group, Nottingham, England, Underground early pioneers of electronic music. Influencers include Cabaret Voltaire and Propaganda.
- NPZ Optics, trading name of the Novosibirsk Instrument-Building Plant
