= Genrikh Padva =

Russian lawyer (1931–2026)

- Генрих Падва
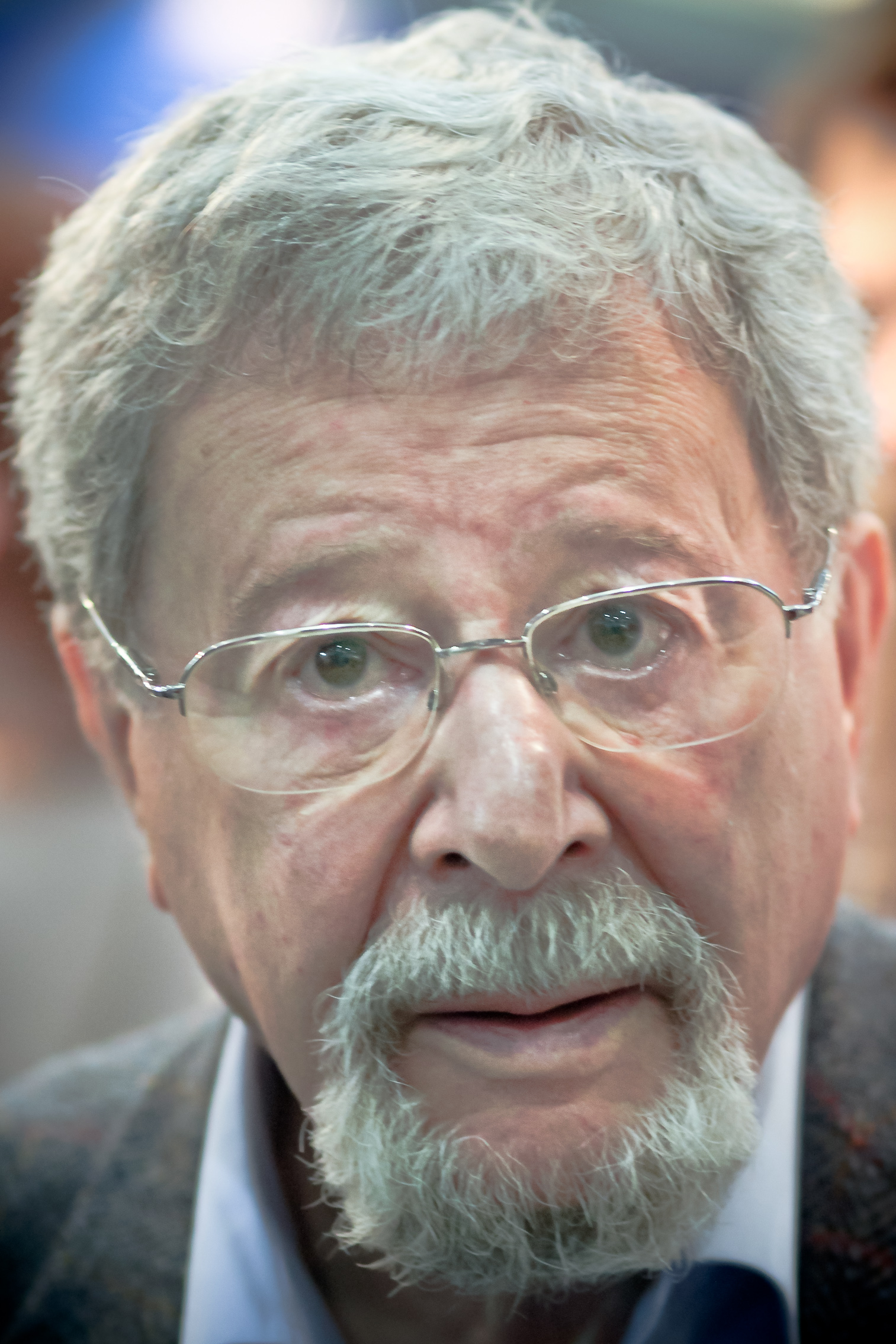
- Padva in 2011
- Born: 20 February 1931; Moscow, Russian SFSR, USSR
- Died: 9 February 2026 (aged 94); Moscow, Russia
- Education: Tver State University
- Occupation: Lawyer

Genrikh Pavlovich Padva (Russian: Генрих Павлович Падва, IPA: [ˈɡʲenrʲɪx ˈpavləvʲɪtɕ ˈpadvə]; 20 February 1931 – 9 February 2026) was one of the most influential and longest-practicing representatives of Soviet and Russian advocacy. His professional career spanned more than seven decades and was characterized by a consistent commitment to upholding the principles of defending the rights of the accused within evolving legal systems. Padva specialized primarily in criminal cases, including those with high public resonance, and made a significant contribution to the development of the institution of the bar in the post-Soviet period.

== Life and career ==
Born in Moscow into the family of an economist, Padva demonstrated an interest in the legal profession from a young age. In 1953, he graduated from the Moscow Law Institute (now the Faculty of Law of Lomonosov Moscow State University). In the same year, he began his legal practice, having been assigned to the Kalinin (now Tver) Region, where in the initial stage of his career he independently handled various criminal and civil cases as the sole lawyer in a district center. In 1961, Padva graduated by correspondence from the Faculty of History of the Kalinin Pedagogical Institute (now Tver State University).

After returning to Moscow in 1971, Padva became a member of the Moscow City Bar Association, and in 1985 he joined its presidium. During the Soviet period, he participated in cases involving the defense of representatives of culture and the arts, including the case related to Vladimir Vysotsky (on charges of violating concert activity regulations), and also defended Olga Ivinskaya, who was closely associated with Boris Pasternak. These trials demonstrated the advocate's ability to work under conditions of strict ideological control and censorship.

In the post-Soviet era, Padva gained widespread recognition for his participation in high-profile criminal trials. Among the most significant were his defense of Vyacheslav Ivankov (known as Yaponchik), Mikhail Khodorkovsky in the first Yukos case, Alisher Usmanov in a dispute with Alexei Navalny, Vladislav Galkin, and Anatoly Lukyanov (a member of the State Committee on the State of Emergency). His approach was distinguished by meticulous preparation of the evidentiary basis and an emphasis on procedural violations by the prosecution.

One of Padva's most important achievements was his role in shaping the legal position that led to the introduction of a moratorium on the death penalty in the Russian Federation. During the consideration by the Constitutional Court of the Russian Federation of issues regarding the compliance of the death penalty with the 1993 Constitution, the arguments supported by the legal community, including Padva's position, contributed to the recognition of this punishment as unconstitutional in the absence of a federal law establishing trial by jury throughout the entire territory of the country. This precedent became a key element in the humanization of Russia's criminal policy in the 1990s and 2000s.

Padva's name is mentioned in the context of discussions on the ethical principles of legal defense, the particularities of defense speeches, and the process of proof in criminal proceedings. His views on the role of the advocate as a guarantor of fair justice are reflected in the analysis of domestic criminal procedure law and legal ethics.

Padva died in Moscow on 9 February 2026, at the age of 94.
