= Dmitry Mishin =

Soviet physicist and magnetic scientist (1919–1998)

- Дми́трий Дми́триевич Ми́шин
- Born: 7 February 1919; Turinsk, Tobolsk Governorate
- Died: 26 August 1998 (aged 79); Tver, Russian Federation
- Citizenship: Soviet Union, Russia
- Education: Ural State University
- Scientific career
- Fields: Physics, Magnetism
- Workplaces: Mil.Plant #217, Ural State University, Tver State University
- Doctoral advisor: Jakov Shur

Dmitry Dmitriyevich Mishin (Russian: Дми́трий Дми́триевич Ми́шин; January 25 [February 7] 1919 – 26 August 1998) was a Soviet and Russian physicist, Doctor (habilitate) of physical and mathematical sciences, professor, founder of the scientific school of magnetic science in Tver State University.

== Study and first employment ==
In 1934 he began working in the Irbit City Inventory Bureau. From 1936 to 1938 he studied at the Workers' Faculty of the Perm Agricultural Institute in Irbit. During his studies at the Faculty of Physics and Mathematics of the Ural State University (1938–1942), one of his mentors was Rudolf Janus. In 1942, after graduating from the University, he began working as a spectroscopic engineer at Military Plant No. 217 "Geophysics" of Ministry of Armament (presently "Yalamov Urals Optical-Mechanical Plant") evacuated from Moscow in 1941. He worked first in the laboratory headed by Arsho A. Chobanyana, a graduate of the Physics Department of the Moscow State University, then until 1948 as a head of the technological department at the same plant.

== Work at the Ural State University ==
In 1951, after graduating from PhD course, he defended his thesis on the topic "The Effect of Small Elastic Stresses on the Initial Susceptibility of Ferromagnetics".

In 1950-1971 he worked as an assistant professor, then associate professor first of the chair of experimental physics, then of the chair of magnetism (since 1958) of the Physics Department of the Ural State University. The subject of study was the influence of the real (defective) crystal structure on the magnetic properties of magnetic materials, including those with rare-earth components. The phenomenological quantitative laws of the effect of the dislocations on the domain structure and the magnetic properties of electrical steels were established.

In 1954–1955, Professor Jakov Shur and Associate Professor D. D. Mishin with graduate students investigated on the order of the Verkh-Isetsk Metallurgical Plant the nature for the uniformity of the magnetic properties of transformer steel along a sheet. D. D. Mishin was one of the founders and managers (1962-1971) of the Problem Laboratory of Permanent Magnets (PLPM) in the Ural State University (presently, the Solid State Magnetism Department of the Research Institute of Physics and Applied Mathematics.

In 1969, the joint research work of the PLPM with the Pyshma Experimental Plant resulted in the organization of an experimental site for the production of permanent magnets based on rear earth metals-cobalt alloys. The first magnets were made only by pressing the original powder, later a special powder sintering technology was developed and applied, which made it possible to improve the magnetic and operational properties of permanent magnets.

In 1970, at Tomsk State University, D. D. Mishin defended his doctoral (habilitation) dissertation on the topic: "The Effect of Dislocation Structure on the Susceptibility and Coercive Force of Siliceous Iron."

== Work at Tver State University ==
In 1971, D.D.Mishin moved to Kalinin and began working at the Kalinin State University (KSU), transformed in the same year from a pedagogical institute to the university.

In 1972, he organised the Department of Magnetism at the Faculty of Physics of KSU. In PhD theses, his PhD students investigated the processes of magnetisation reversal in rare-earth metal alloys (Sm, Pr, Nd, Dy, etc.) with metals of iron and boron groups. A method of fabrication of permanent magnets with sufficiently improved properties has been developed, the laws governing the changes in the domain structure during various effects on permanent magnets have been established. The implementation of the results of his work in the industry was noted by gold and silver medals of Soviet Exhibition of Achievements of National Economy in 1987-1990.

In 1988, by the decision of the USSR Academy of Sciences, the XVIII All-Union Conference on the Physics of Magnetic Phenomena was held at the base of the Department of Magnetism in Tver.

In 1996, D. D. Mishin became an honorary professor at Tver State University.

== Scientific and educational activities ==
D. D. Mishin's research interests were in the field of physics of magnetic phenomena, the physical properties of rare earth metals, their alloys and compounds, the processes of formation of a highly coercive state in new hard magnetic materials, the experimental production of high-energy permanent magnets. Under the leadership of D. D. Mishin, 2 doctors (habilitate) and 20 candidate of physical and mathematical sciences (PhD) were trained in the department. He developed new special courses: the physics of magnetic phenomena, the physics of real crystals, the physics of magnetic materials, the influence of physical factors on the properties of permanent magnets, and current problems of magnetism.

== Main publications ==
D. D. Mishin - author of about 200 scientific publications, 1 monograph and 15 certificates for inventions, 2 patents for inventions, 2 useful models, the sole inventor and patent owner of two inventions No. 2125333 and No. 2112294. Monographies:

- Mishin, D. D. (1991). Magnetic materials.[in Russian]. M.: Higher School. p. 384. ISBN 5-06-000628-X.
- D. D. Mishin; et al. (1973–1992). "Physics of magnetic materials: Interuniversity sb. scientific tr" (in Russian). Tver State University Press.

== Awards ==
- Medal "For Valiant Labour in the Great Patriotic War 1941–1945" (1945)
- Jubilee Medal "In Commemoration of the 100th Anniversary of the Birth of Vladimir Ilyich Lenin" For Valiant Labour.
- Medal "Veteran of Labour"
- Badge "Inventor of the USSR"

== Memory ==
In May 2002, at the All-Russian Workshop "Magnetic anisotropy and hysteresis properties of rare-earth alloys", dedicated to the 30th anniversary of the Magnetism Department of Tver State University, Rector A. N. Kudinov was invited to establish a D. D. Mishin scholarship for the best students of the Faculty of Physics.

On September 20, 2019 TvSU hosted an expanded meeting of the Academic senate of the Faculty of Physics and Technology dedicated to the 100th anniversary of the birth of D. D. Mishin.
