= Vladimir Sergeyevich Semenikhin =

- Born: January 27, 1918; Sumy
- Died: November 27, 1990 (aged 72); Moscow
- Alma mater: Moscow Power Engineering Institute

Vladimir Sergeyevich Semenikhin (Russian: Владимир Сергеевич Семенихин; 1918, in Sumy – 1990, in Moscow) was a Soviet Russian scientist, Academician of the Academy of Sciences of the USSR (since 1972). Hero of Socialist Labour (1981). Doctor of Sciences in Technical Sciences (1963), and professor (1965).

== Career ==
He graduated from the Moscow Power Engineering Institute in 1941. He was a student at the Donetsk National Technical University. He worked in the Urals Optical-Mechanical Plant.

He was director of the Scientific Research Institute of automatic equipment (1963–1971). In 1964, he defended his doctoral thesis and, in 1965, he received the title of Professor. He was elected a corresponding member of the Academy of Sciences of the USSR in 1968.

Starting in 1974, he headed the Department at the MIREA – Russian Technological University.

Semenikhin is the author more than 200 scientific works.
