= Polyus =

Polyus may refer to:

- Polyus (spacecraft), a Soviet spacecraft launched in 1987 that failed to reach orbit
- Polyus (company), a Russian gold mining company
- Polyus Scientific Research Institute, in Moscow, Russia
- Polyus Studios, a Canadian aerospace YouTuber.

== See also ==
- Pole of Inaccessibility research station (Russian: Полюс недоступности, Polyus nedostupnosti), in Antarctica
