= Anna Zhuchkova =

Russian academic

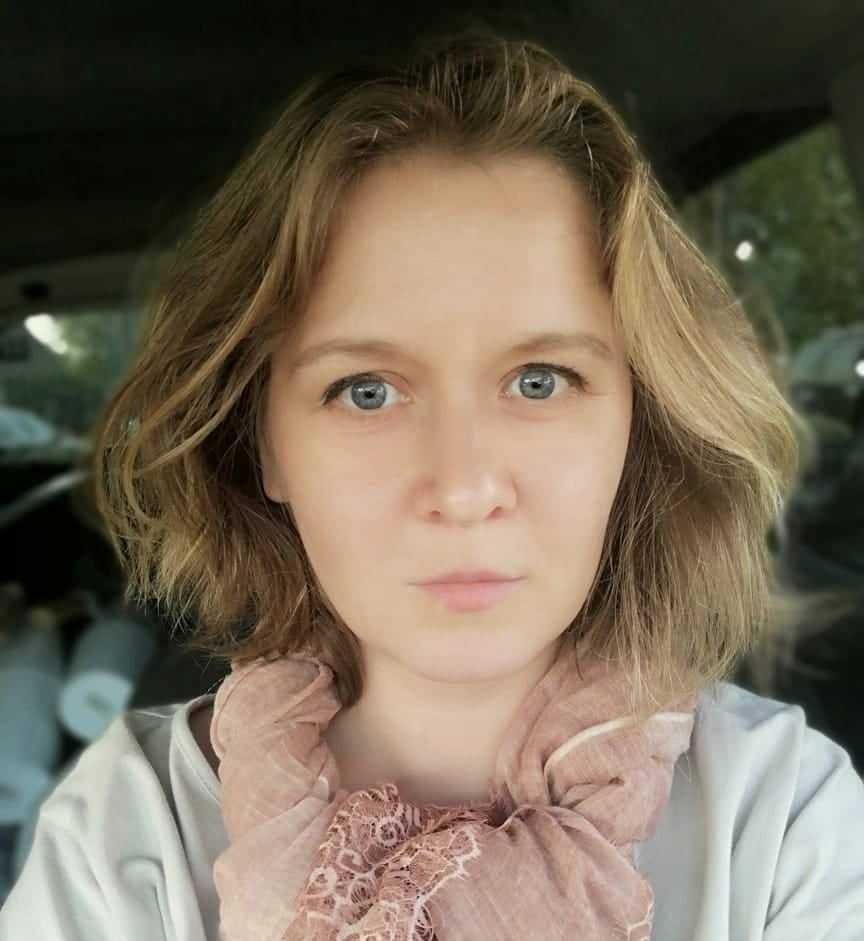

Anna Vladimirovna Zhuchkova (Russian: Анна Владимировна Жучкова; born 5 October 1979 in Lytkarino) is a Russian literary critic and academic. Candidate of philological sciences, Docent at the Philological Faculty of RUDN University. She is the editor of the Textura.club (since 2020).

Anna Zhuchkova graduated from Philological Faculty of RUDN University.

She published in Znamya, Oktyabr, Novy Mir.

Zhuchkova is the author of more than 100 scientific articles.

She is the author of «Магия поэтики О. Мандельштама» (2009).
