= Kobra sight =

Russian collimator sight

Kobra
- A Kobra sight mounted on a Vepr carbine (left)
- Type: Collimator (reflex) sight
- Place of origin: Russia

Production history
- Designer: Izhevsk Motozavod
- Designed: 1990s
- Manufacturer: JSC "Izhevsk Motozavod 'Axion-Holding'"
- Produced: Late 1990s – present
- Variants: EKP-1S-03, EKP-8-02, EKP-8-18 and others

Specifications
- Mass: 380 to 410 g (13 to 14 oz)
- Length: 144 to 154 mm (5.7 to 6.1 in)
- Width: 46 to 66 mm (1.8 to 2.6 in)
- Height: 85 to 144 mm (3.3 to 5.7 in)

The Kobra (Russian: «Кобра», lit. 'Cobra') is a family of Russian electronic collimator (reflex) sights made by the Izhevsk Motozavod "Axion-Holding" in Izhevsk. It entered the market in the late 1990s and was one of the few domestically produced collimator sights available in Russia at the time.

The sight is intended for AK-pattern rifles, Saiga and Vepr carbines, and hunting shotguns, and can be fitted to several different mounting systems. It is not formally in service with the Russian armed forces and has no GRAU index, but it has been bought privately by Russian service personnel and used by special-forces units, including during the Chechen conflicts.

== History ==
The Kobra was developed and manufactured by the Izhevsk Motozavod, a defence and instrument-making plant in Udmurtia. By the late 1990s the sight was already on sale; a Russian gun writer recalled acquiring one produced at the plant in that period, when it was one of the few domestic collimators with a good reputation among shooters.

According to the manufacturer, the sight was aimed at special-purpose units of the armed forces, the FSB and the MVD. It was tested at the TsNII Tochmash research institute, at the FGUP NTO "Spetstekhnika i Svyaz" certification centre, in the "Krechet" special-purpose detachment, and in reconnaissance and special-purpose units of the Internal troops. In 2000 the sight was named a winner of the "Top Hundred Products of Russia" programme and received a gold diploma.

The design was subsequently modernised. Current production includes the EKP-8 series and the EKP-1S-03; the earlier EKP-8M-PP has been discontinued.

== Design ==
The factory designation EKP (ЭКП) stands for "electronic collimator sight"; English-language export material used the abbreviation ECS. The Kobra is an open collimator sight: the illuminated reticle is projected into the same plane as the target, so the shooter aims with one or both eyes open and the field of view is not limited by a tube. The reticle can be one of four patterns, selected with buttons on the sight, and its brightness has 16 levels; both settings are stored in memory and restored when the sight is switched on. The four patterns are a small dot for precise fire, a chevron, a three-bar pattern intended for close-quarters use, and a dot-and-chevron combination. The standard dot subtends 1.8 minutes of angle.

The housing is sealed against moisture and dust and is described by the manufacturer as lightweight and shockproof. The manufacturer rates the sight for operation from −40 to 50 °C (−40 to 122 °F) and for use with powerful ammunition, including 12-gauge Magnum shotgun shells, 7.62×54mmR and .30-06 Springfield; the sight was also designed for use together with an under-barrel grenade launcher. Ballistic correction is available from 100 to 600 m (330 to 1,970 ft), and the sight works across illumination levels from daylight to moonlight.

The sight runs on a 3-volt battery. The manufacturer quotes about 70 hours of continuous operation at medium brightness with the dot reticle, while an owner test cited by RussianOptics.net measured roughly 800 hours using rechargeable cells.

Manufacturer data for two current models:

Manufacturer data
Model	Mass	Dimensions	Reticles	Brightness levels	Battery life	Operating range
EKP-1S-03	410 g (14 oz)	144 × 66 × 144 mm	4	16	70 h	−40 to 50 °C (−40 to 122 °F)
EKP-8-18	380 g (13 oz)	154 × 46 × 85 mm	4	16	70 h	−40 to 50 °C (−40 to 122 °F)

== Models ==
Different Kobra sight settings

The Kobra has been produced in a large number of versions that differ mainly in their mounting system:

- EKP-1S-03 – first-generation model with a side rail mount for AK-pattern rifles and SVD-type carbines; early examples used two AA cells, while current production uses a 3-volt CR2 or LT14250 battery.
- EKP-1S-03M – improved first-generation model, distinguished by a rubber sunshade.
- EKP-8-02 – second-generation model with a side rail mount and disc-type 3-volt batteries.
- EKP-8-01, 8-04, 8-05, 8-07, 8-16, 8-20 – versions for hunting carbines and shotguns, using proprietary, 11 mm dovetail or ventilated-rib mounts.
- EKP-8-14, 8-15, 8-18 – versions for Weaver and Picatinny rails, intended for AR-15-type rifles and other weapons with Western-style rails.
- EKP-8-21 – a current production model for Dovetail mount listed alongside the EKP-1S-03.
- EKP-8M-PP – an earlier model, no longer produced.

== Reception ==
The Kobra became one of the best-known Russian collimator sights and was exported, including to the United States civilian market. RussianOptics.net notes that it is well liked by Russian troops and proved durable in the Chechen conflicts, but that some batches imported into the United States suffered from defective on/off switches, giving the sight a mixed reputation there. The sight has also been copied by Chinese manufacturers of airsoft equipment.

Because the Kobra was never formally adopted, it is not general-issue equipment; it has instead been purchased privately by individual soldiers and units.

== See also ==
- Red dot sight
- Reflector sight
- PSO-1
- 1P63
