= Rubinar =

Soviet lens design series

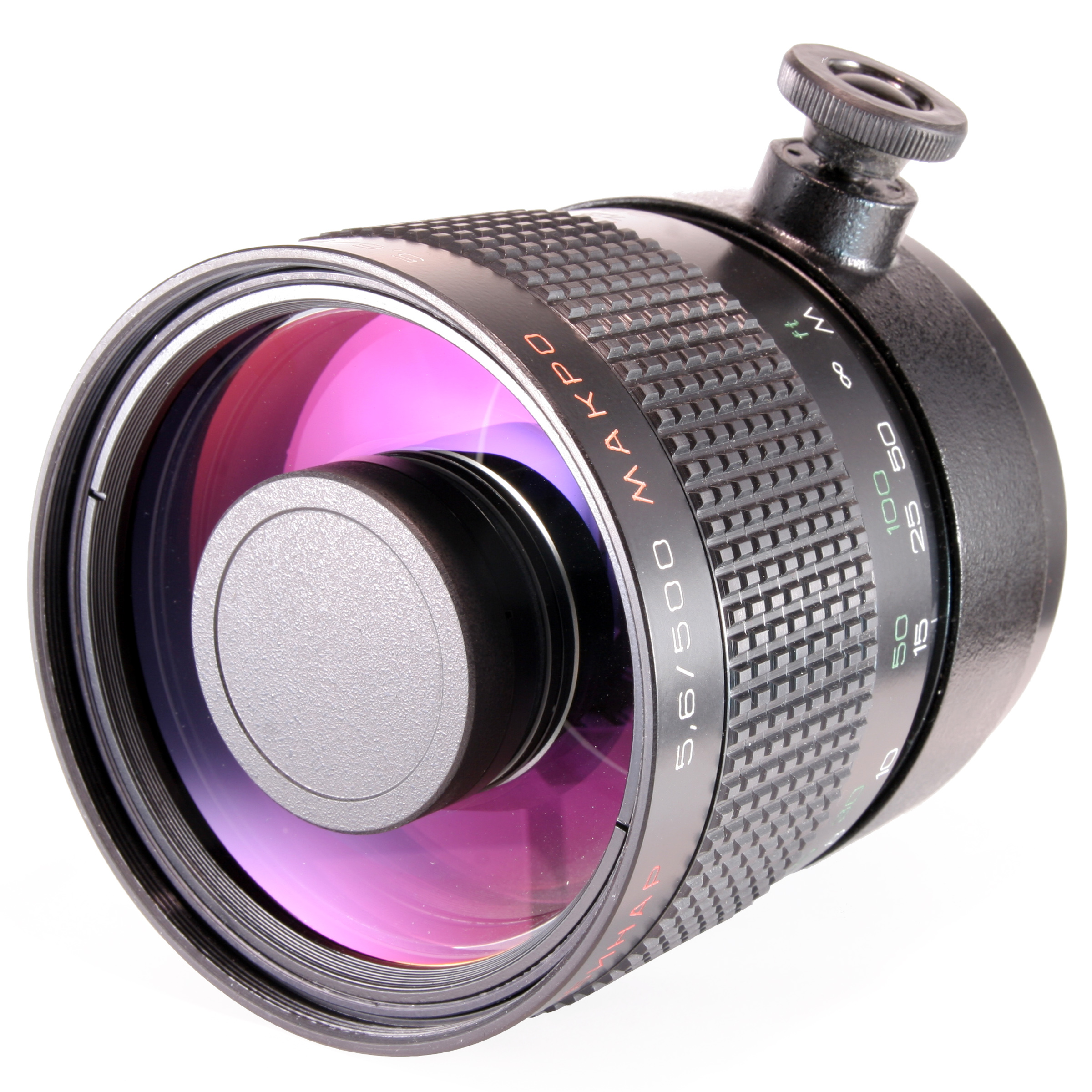
Rubinar 1:5.6 500 mm

Rubinar (Russian: Рубинар) is a Soviet lens design series developed and produced by JSC Lytkarino Plant of Optical Glass (LZOS). It is compact despite its long focal lengths.

Rubinars can be used with proprietary mount cameras by using M42 adaptors. Focusing motors are absent though (manual only), and so are the variable apertures.

== Variants ==
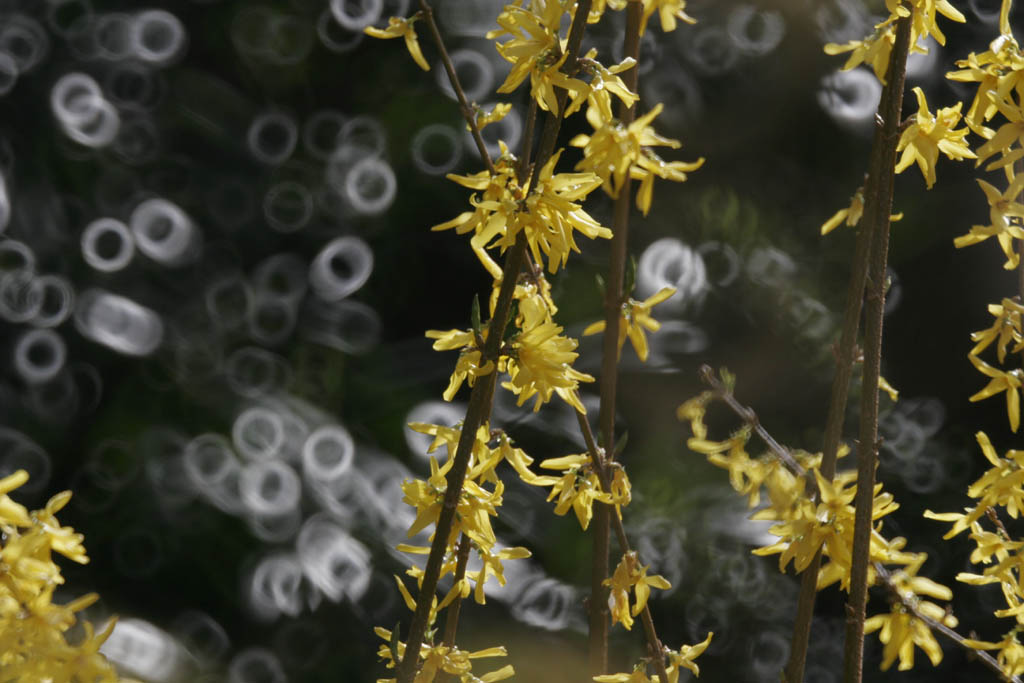
Forsythia with characteristic donut shaped blur (Bokeh) due to the presence of the central obscuration in the catadioptric system. Focus on foreground. Rubinar 5,6/500

- MC Rubinar - 1:8.0 500 mm
- MC Rubinar - 1:4.5 300 mm
- MC Rubinar - 1:5.6 500 mm
- MC Rubinar - 1:10 1000 mm
- Rubinars may be transformed into spotting scopes using an M42 Turist-FL ocular attachment and image redresser. Their optical arrangement gives flexibility in placing the focal plane and changing the focal ratio by mere refocus.
- Astro-Rubinar is a Rubinar 1000 mm kit including oculars and a 90° prism for convenient use as a visual telescope.
- MTO lenses by Soviet manufacturer KMZ utilise a similar design, with a single Maksutov achromatic corrector.
