= NPO Orion =

- Native name: НПО «Орион»
- Company type: Joint-stock company
- Founded: 1946
- Headquarters: Moscow, Russia
- Parent: Shvabe Holding
- Website: www.orion-ir.ru

Orion Scientific Production Association (Russian: НПО «Орион») is a company based in Moscow, Russia. It is part of the Shvabe Holding (Rostec group).

The Orion Scientific Production Association in Moscow is a major designer, developer, and manufacturer of high technology military and aerospace electronics. It also produces special electronics for the space industry, which are used in both space launchers and satellites. In 1991, Orion entered into an agreement with a Russian-French joint venture radio station to produce commercial stereo receivers.

== Scientific activities and awards ==
The works of NPO Orion JSC were awarded with Stalin, Lenin, State Prizes and prizes of the Government of the USSR and Russia., 48 employees of the enterprise became laureates. The activities, devices and developments of NPO Orion JSC have received awards from international scientific societies, symposiums, exhibitions and salons of innovations in Russia, the USA, Germany, Great Britain, France, Switzerland, Belgium, China, South Korea and Colombia.
