= Irina Popova =

Russian / Dutch photographer

Irina Popova (born 1986) is a Russian-Dutch documentary photographer.

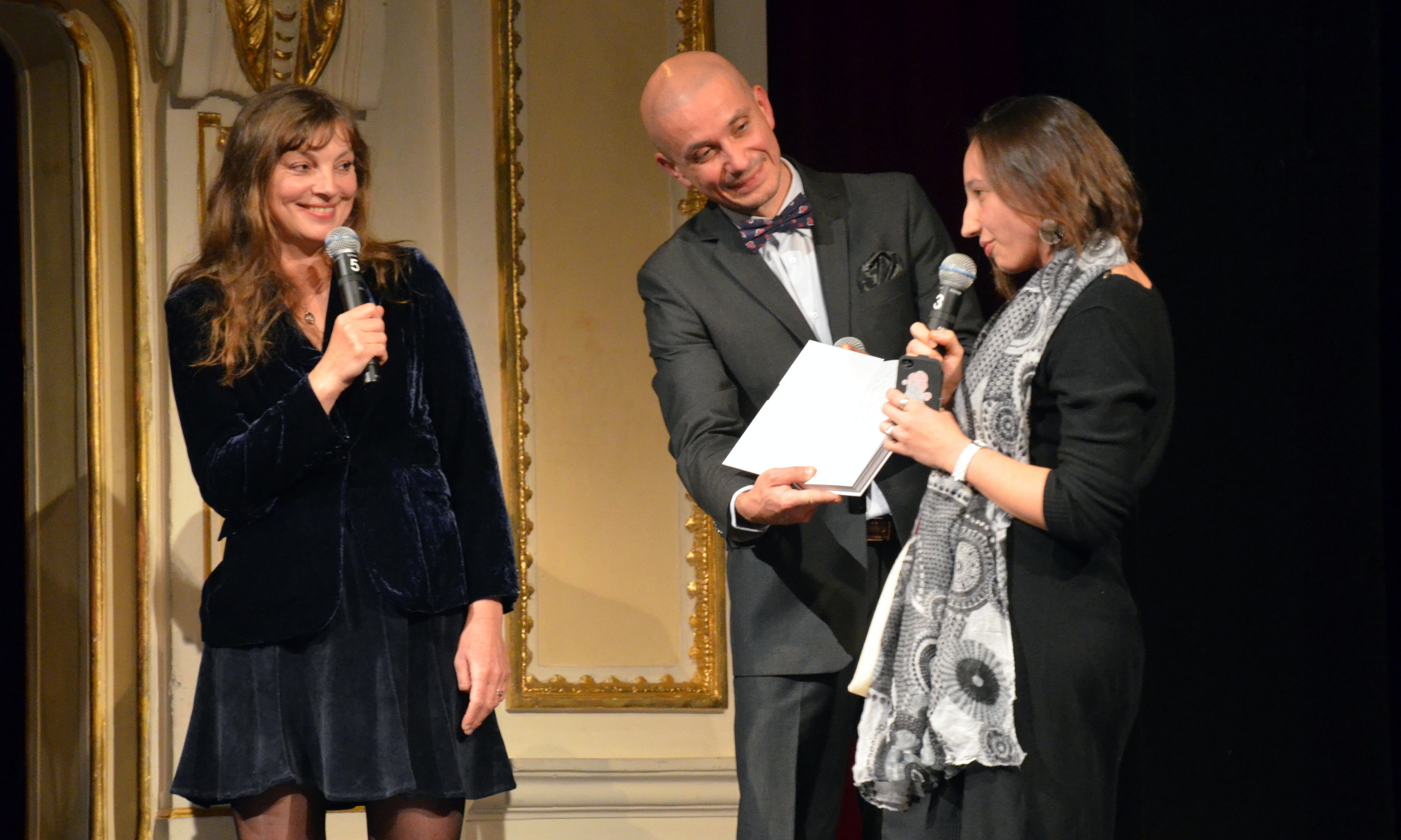
Popova at FotoArtFestival, 2015

== Early life and education ==
Popova was born in Tver, Russia. She has studied and worked as a photographer since age 16. She is a graduate of the Tver State University School of Journalism, and studied photography at FotoDepartament in St. Petersburg in 2007. Between 2008 and 2010, she studied documentary photography and mixed media at the Rodchenko Moscow School of Photography and Multimedia.

== Life and work ==
In 2008, on a student photography assignment, she moved in for two weeks with a young family in a tiny apartment in St Petersburg. "Friends moved freely in and out of the space, music was played, people partied with alcohol and drugs"—all with a young child present. Popova has said that her intention with the work "was to talk about the possibilities of love on the margins of society". A gallery exhibition was well received. However, when Popova published some of the photographs online, hundreds of commentators were upset by the way they perceived the couple to be treating their child. Popova since regrets the accompanying captions and text "which emphasised squalor and neglect and said nothing about love." According to Blake Morrison, writing in The Guardian:

The story of the photos raises a number of fascinating issues: about exploitation, voyeurism and embedded reportage; about the moral responsibility of a photographer or any artist who deals in non-fiction; about the differences between images seen in a gallery and images posted online; and about the meaning of informed consent.

Popova's resulting book, Another Family (2013), contains photographs as well as "many documents that relate to the work: the initial assignment she received, correspondence with mentors about the direction of the work, a journal she kept, and email she received".

The Incomplete Princess Book (2016) is "a compilation of 8000 images of other Irina Popovas registered on the social network Vkontakte".

== Publications ==
- Cuba is Near. Mendeleevo: BArt, 2010.
- Narocco. Amsterdam: Rare Bird, 2011.
- Native Soil. Amsterdam: Rare Bird, 2012.
- Another Family. Amsterdam: Schilt; Moscow: Treemedia, 2013. ISBN 978-9053307793. Photographs by Popova as well as her journal and various written ephemera.
- If you have a Secret. Amsterdam: Dostoevsky, 2014. Photographs and text by Popova. Edition of 100 copies.
  - Second edition. Amsterdam: Dostoevsky, 2017. OCLC 1097679001. Edition of 400 English and 100 Russian copies. "The second version has a different design, double-folded "secret" pages, and other features. The photos are only 75% the same with previous edition, and the texts are re-vised and re-edited."
- Bijlmer: Atlas of People and Birds. 2014.
- Welcome To LTP. Amsterdam: Dostoevsky. 2015. Edition of 600 copies.
- Iconic Drawings. Amsterdam: Dostoevsky. 2015. Edition of 80 copies.
- The Incomplete Princess Book. Amsterdam: Dostoevsky, 2016. ISBN 9789082170467. Edition of 300 copies.
- The First Beauty Pageant. 2018. Edition of 50 copies.
- Lost in Istanbul. 2019. Edition of 20 copies.
