= 1P63 =

Russian reflex sight

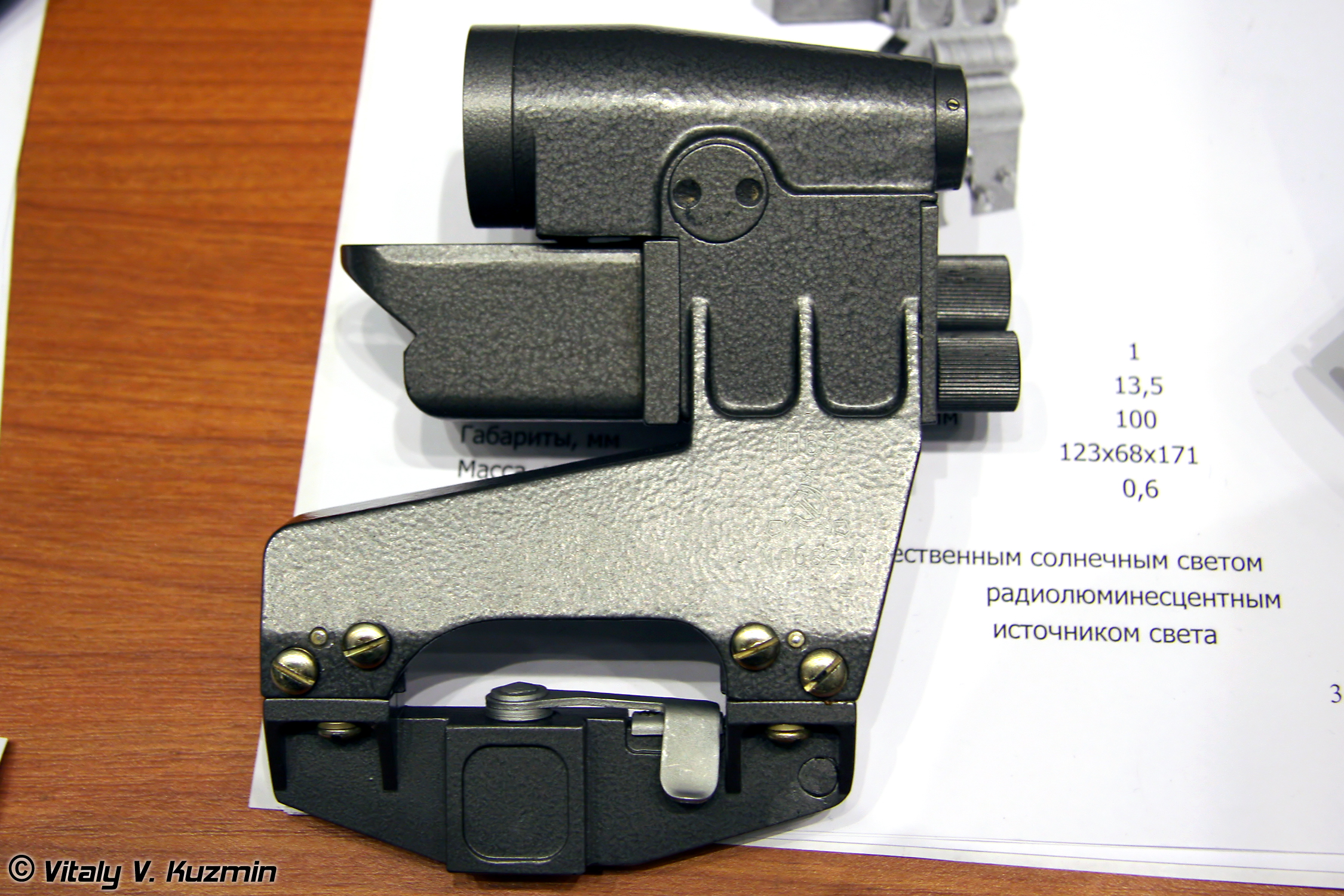
- 1P63 Reflex sight
- Type: Reflex sight
- Place of origin: Russian Federation

Service history
- Wars: Annexation of Crimea

Specifications
- Mass: 0.6 kg

The 1P63 is a Russian reflex sight designed for use on AK rifle family weapons compatible with dovetail sights, such as the AKMN, AKMSN, AK-74N, AK-74M, AK-100, and AN-94. The 1P63 was developed by the Central Design Bureau "Tochpribor" (Novosibirsk) as part of the "Zapev" program. It is produced by the Novosibirsk Instrument-Building Plant. A civilian version, designated as NPZ PK1, and colloquially the Obzor, is also produced by the same factory. It was used by Russian troops during Annexation of Crimea.

== Gallery ==
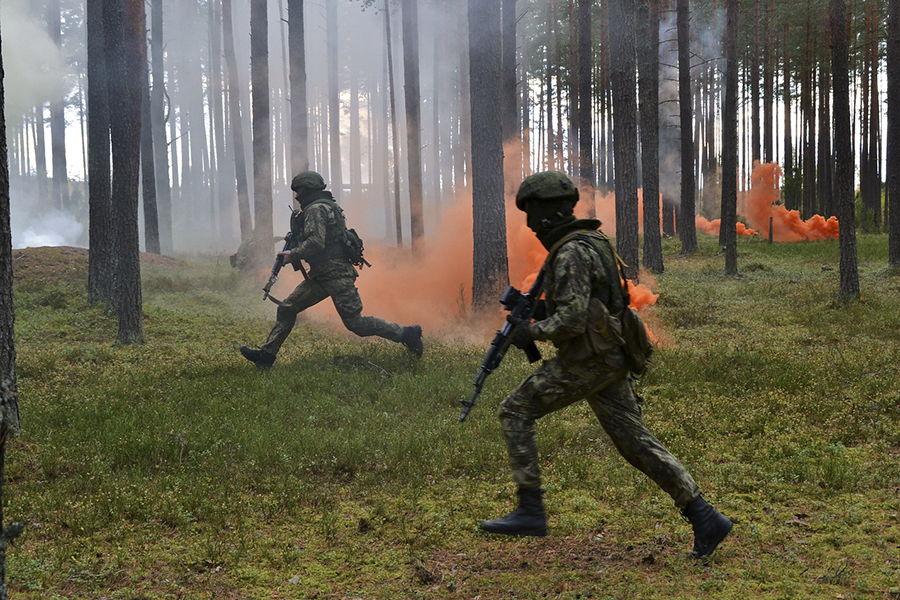
Russian soldier using an AK rifle with 1P63 sight during an exercise
