= Lytkarino =

Town in Moscow Oblast, Russia

Lytkarino Лыткарино
- Town
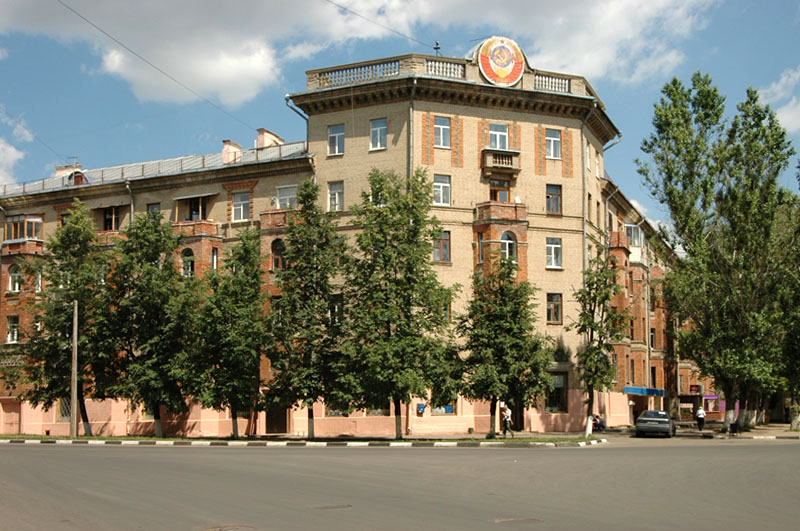

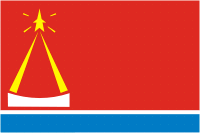
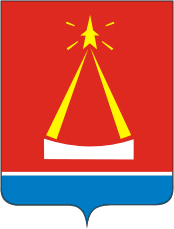
- Flag Coat of arms
- Interactive map of Lytkarino
- Location of Lytkarino Lytkarino (Moscow Oblast)
- Coordinates: 55°35′N 37°54′E
- Country: Russia
- Federal subject: Moscow Oblast
- Founded: first half of the 15th century
- Town status since: 1957
- Elevation: 150 m (490 ft)

Population (2010 Census)
  - Total: 55,237
  - Estimate (2025): 66,930 (+21.2%)
  - Rank: 301st in 2010

Administrative status
  - Subordinated to: Lytkarino Town Under Oblast Jurisdiction
  - Capital of: Lytkarino Town Under Oblast Jurisdiction

Municipal status
  - Urban okrug: Lytkarino Urban Okrug
  - Capital of: Lytkarino Urban Okrug
- Time zone: UTC+3 (MSK)
- Postal code: 140080–140083
- OKTMO ID: 46741000001

Lytkarino (Russian: Лытка́рино) is a town in Moscow Oblast, Russia, located on the left bank of the Moskva River 6 kilometers (3.7 mi) southeast of Moscow (from MKAD). The population was 65,212 in the 2021 census.

== Administrative and municipal status ==
Within the framework of administrative divisions, it is incorporated as Lytkarino Town Under Oblast Jurisdiction—an administrative unit with the status equal to that of the districts. As a municipal division, Lytkarino Town Under Oblast Jurisdiction is incorporated as Lytkarino Urban Okrug.

== Notable people ==
- Nikolay Rastorguyev (born 1957), singer and politician
- Dmitri Sadov (born 1997), footballer
- Evgeny Stalev (born 1979), billiard player

== See also ==
- Lytkarino Optical Glass Plant
