= Botanical Garden of Tver State University =

Botanical garden in Russia

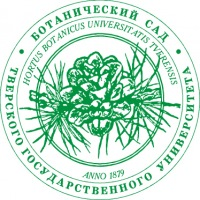

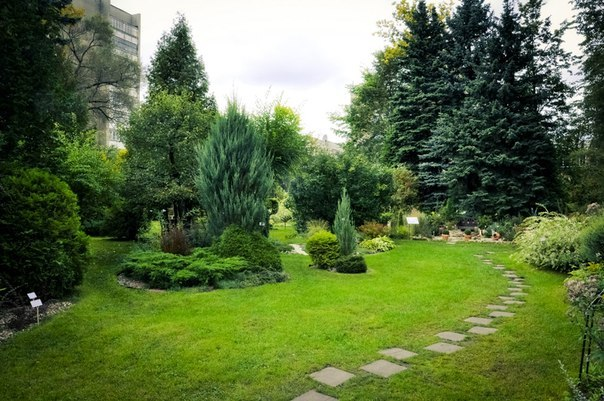
- French garden
- Interactive map of Botanical Garden of Tver State University
- Type: Botanical, fauna, flora
- Location: Tver, Russia, 16 Shevchenko lane
- Coordinates: 56°52′10″N 35°55′00″E
- Area: 2.6 hectares (6.4 acres)
- Opened: October 30, 1879
- Owner: Tver State University
- Visitors: More than 25 000
- Status: Open all year
- Website: gardentver.ru

Botanical Garden of Tver State University — the northernmost botanical garden with an exhibition of steppe plants, only one of its kind in the Upper Volga. Located in Zavolzhsky Tver region in Russia, near the confluence of the Volga with Tvertsa. Besides being an archaeological monument, it is valued as a site of historical, cultural and natural heritage.

The garden includes about 350 species of trees and shrubs and over 2500 herbaceous plants. The garden is committed to preserving the botanical biodiversity of the Upper Volga region. One of the major attractions in the gardens is a pond dating back to the 18th century.

== Garden History ==
Originally the garden belonged to Otroch monastery. It was located in Zavolzhsky Posad Tver. In 1879, the merchant guild I I. Bobrov was founded private garden. Trees (oak, larch), put in the time, preserved to this day.

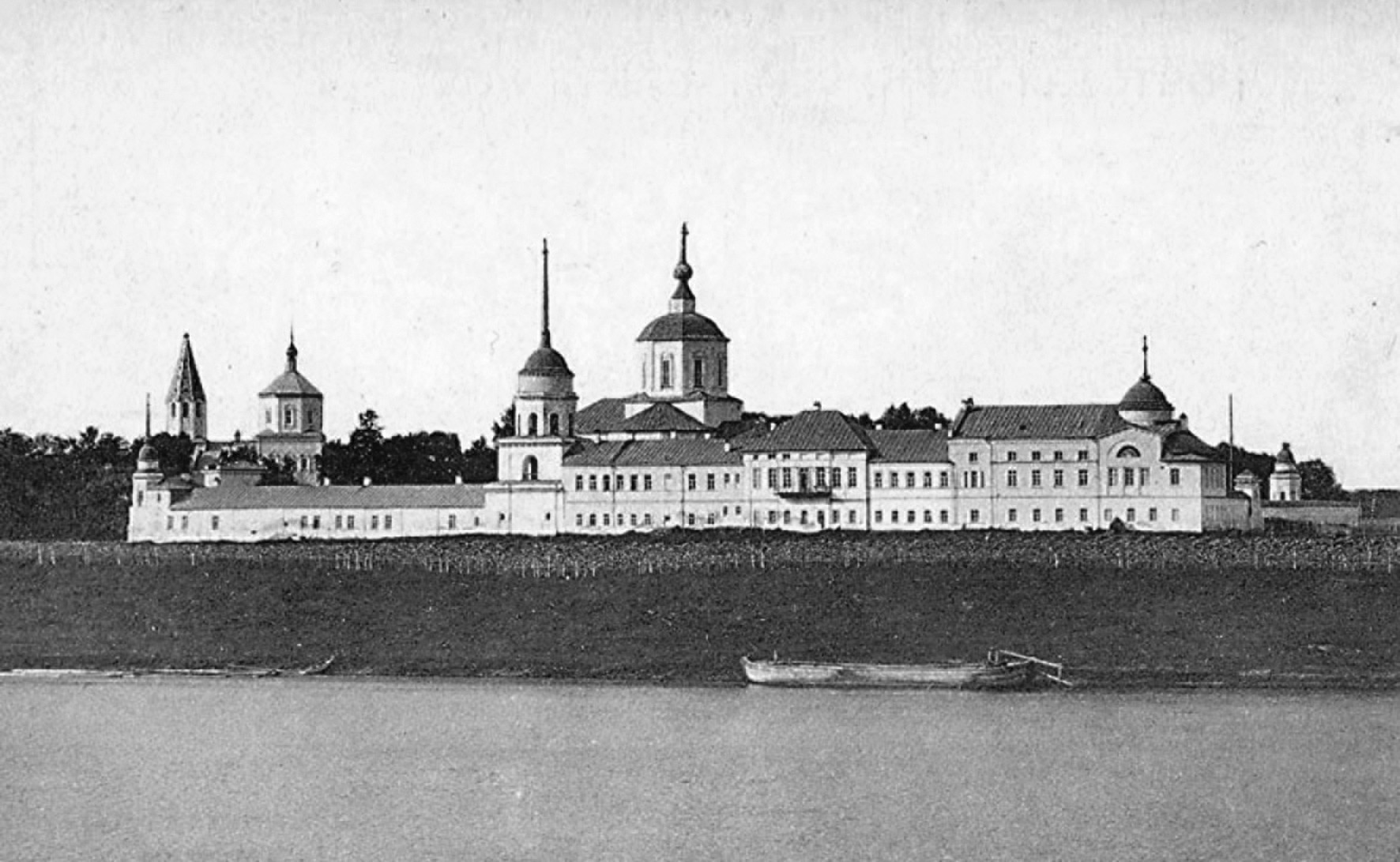
The Otroch Monastery, which originally owned the garden.

In 1898, the owner of the garden was the teacher of a secondary school science Tver and female school Maksimovic Leonid A. Kolakowski. At the garden (1.5 ha), he gathered an extensive collection of trees and shrubs, formed by the exposure of plant geography. The garden Kolakowski often conducts workshops with students of the school Maksimychka. Bequest Kolakowski (1930) garden was handed City Department of Education.

Before 1938, was used as a child care Children's park, recreation and games. In 1938, the executive committee of the city council passed it Pedagogical Institute for Botanical Gardens. Organization engaged in botanical institutions Tver known botanist A.A. Lebedev and M.L. Nevsky. By 1941, laid the basic collections, landscaped area, made new planting.

During the occupation, Kalinin garden suffered. His recovery began only in 1949 in accordance with the scheduled program M.L. Nevsky. Was landscaped area, laid new expositions, to complete your collection of plants, built a greenhouse and a building for employees.

The program includes:

- Training and experimental work with the students of botany;
- Popularization of botanical knowledge
- Experiments on the introduction and acclimatization of individual species.

In 1973, the territory was transferred to the city garden 'Trust of green building. " Gradually became neglected garden square. Many unique plants were spared from death by V.V. Veselov, who volunteered to take care of a garden.

Since 1989, the Botanical Garden is a division of the Tver State University. In 1997, the Botanical Garden of Tver State University became a member of Botanic Gardens Conservation (BGCI). From August 2, 1996 the garden was opened to the public.

In 2009, the garden turned 130. On 1 September 2009 the garden has a new status - "Research and Education Center" Botanical Garden "".

== Organization of the garden ==
The garden is divided in following departments, each focusing on a sub-branch of botany, or engaging in education or organization of the garden.

- Department of Natural Flora
- Department of Dendrology
- Department of Decorative Flowers
- Department for Student Education
- Department of Ecological Education and Awareness
- Department of Marketing and Public Relations
- Scientific Herbarium
- Laboratory of Landscape Architecture

== Exposure garden ==
- Plants in the tropics and subtropics

Placed on the territory of some 350 species. The most widely represented the family Araceae (about 50 species), Orchidaceae (about 20 species), Polypodiaceae (about 30 species), Arecaceae (15 species), Bromeliaceae (10 species), Agavaceae (10 species), Gesneriaceae (10 species), Liliaceae (10 species).

- Plants European steppes

At the station placed 135 species. Most of the species collected in the collection of natural habitats. Represented by steppe species, for which the Tver region is the northern boundary of the range. Some of the plants are from isolated populations located far enough away from the northern border of the range.

- Systematic plot

Collected more than 260 species of plants from 42 seymeystv located in Engler. Plants exposure are morphological and taxonomic diversity within the family. Collection is used for the educational process and educational outreach.

- Alpine slide
- Plot of useful plants

The foundations for exposures:

- Starytska gate
- Vyshnevolotskko-Novotorzhsky shaft (Valdai)
- Mineratrofnoe swamp
- Valdai Hills

== Gallery ==
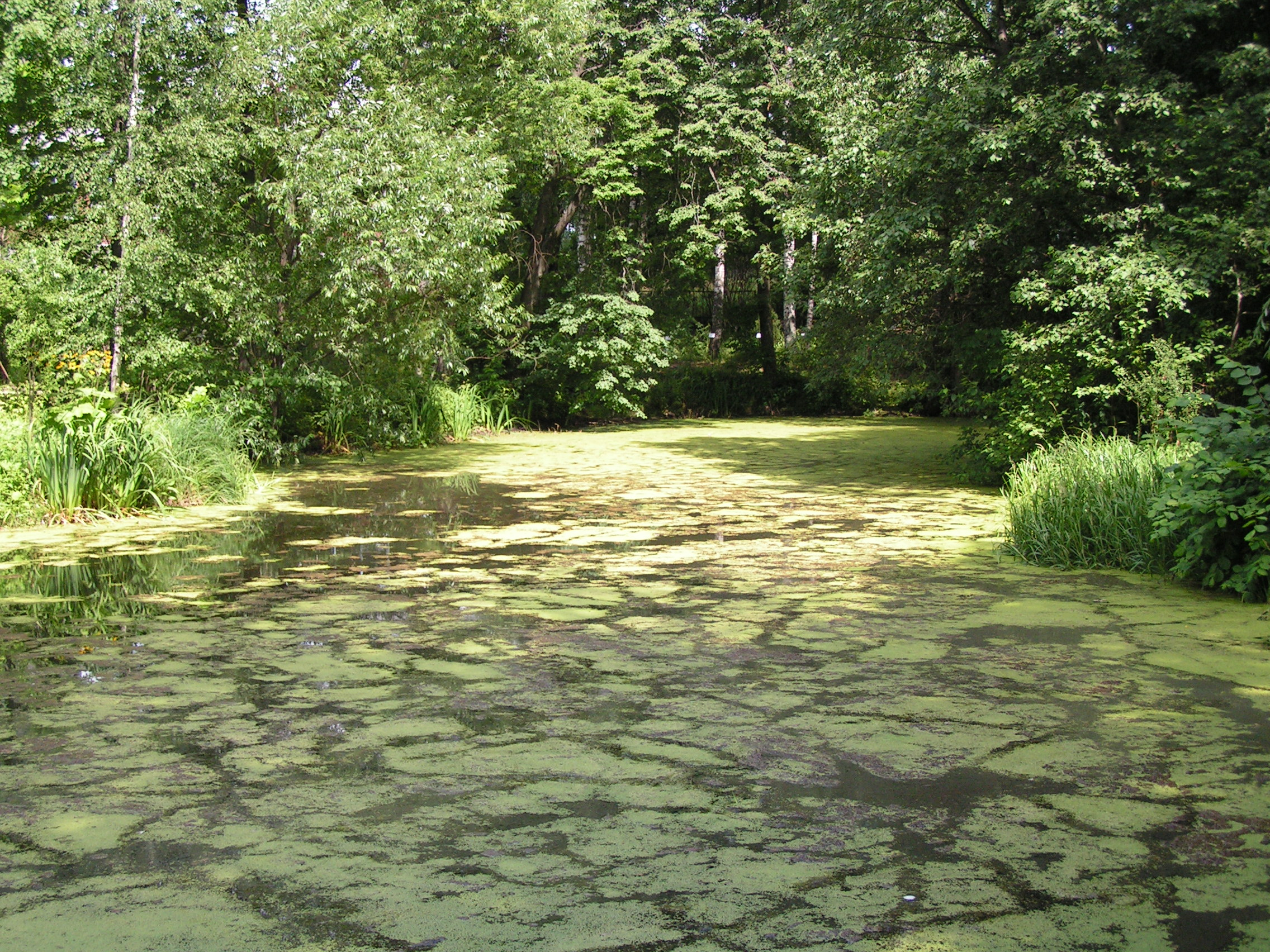
Pond

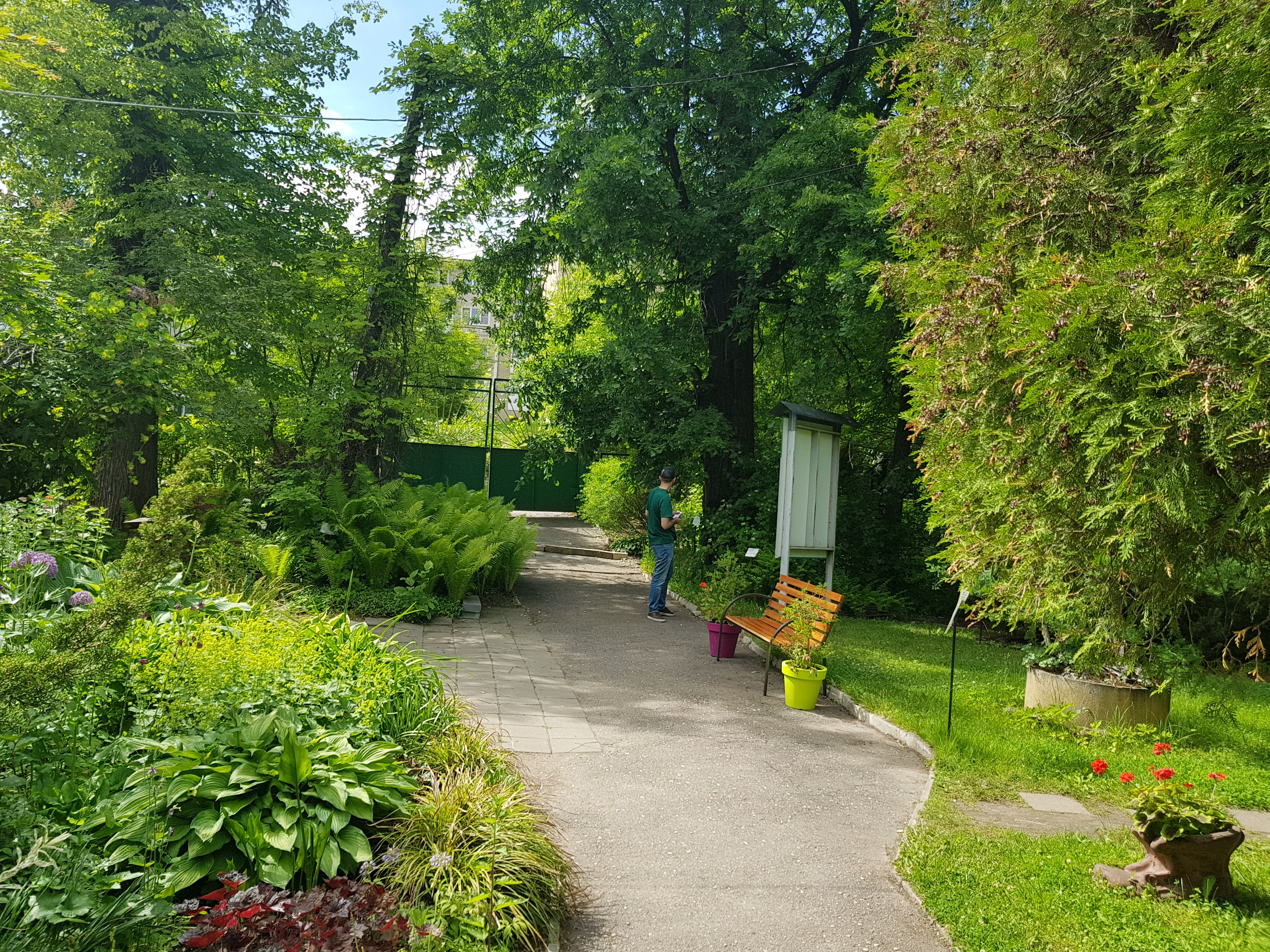
Botanical Garden

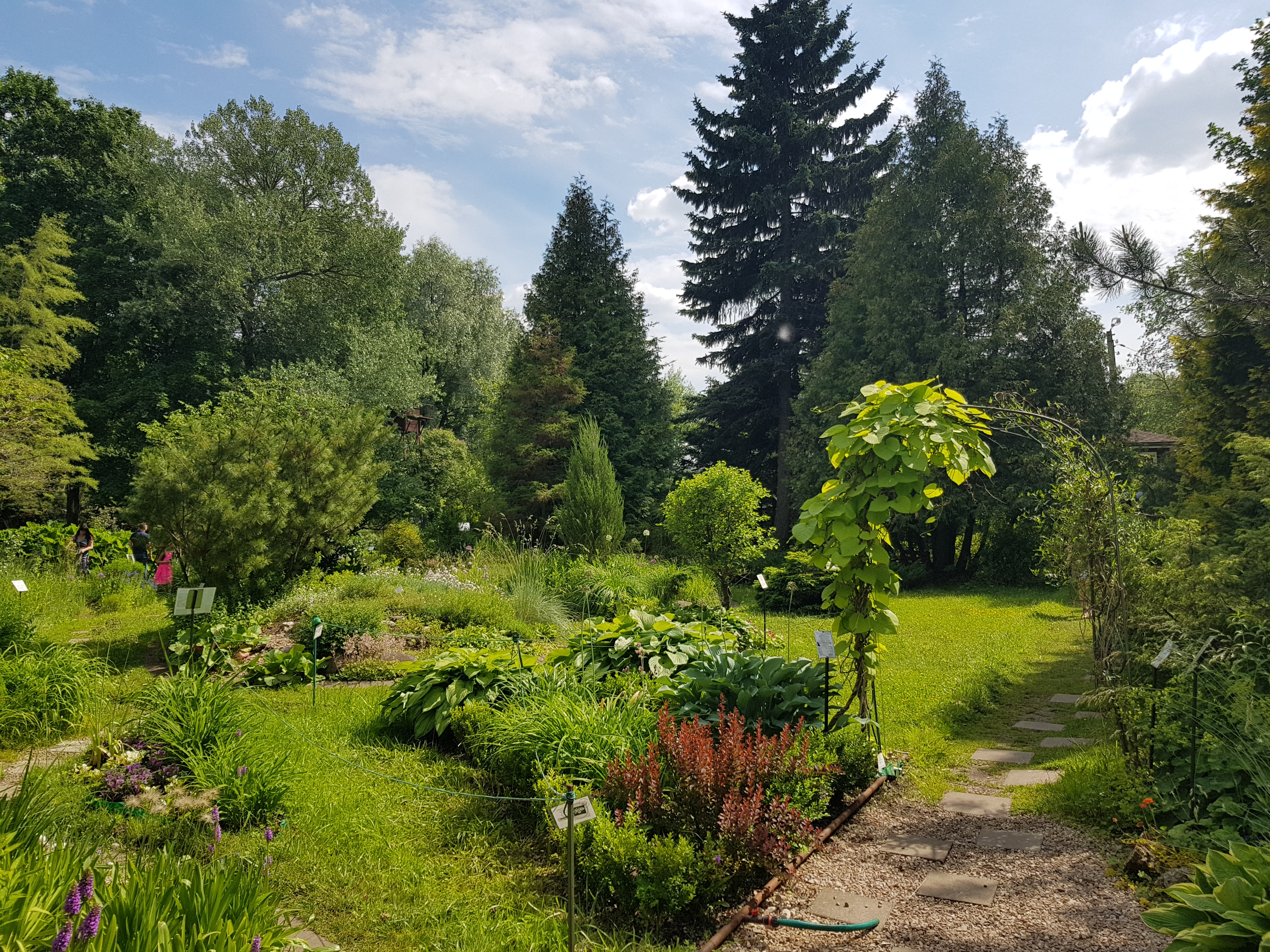
Botanical Garden
