= Tver State University =

University in Tver, Russia

- Тверской государственный университет
- Former names: Maksimovich School, Kalinin State Pedagogical Institute
- Motto: ТвГУ — Твой гарант успеха
- Motto in English: TvGU — Your guarantor of success
- Type: Public
- Established: 1870 (1971 in current form)
- Founder: P. Maksimovich
- Rector: Sergey Smirnov, acting
- Students: 6 500
- Postgraduates: 150
- Location: Zhelyabova 33, Tver, Russia; 53.8544°N 35.9111°E
- Campus: Urban
- Nickname: TvGU
- Website: en.tversu.ru Building details
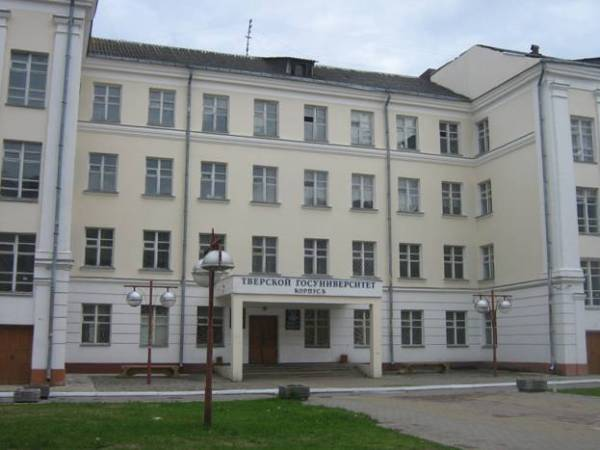

Tver State University (Russian: Тверской государственный университет) is university in the city of Tver, the oldest and one of the largest universities in the Tver region.

Tver State University was founded in 1870 by public figure and teacher P.P. Maksimovich as the Tver Women's Teachers' School, which in June 1917 was transformed by order of the Minister of Public Education into the Tver Teachers' Institute. As a result, he was transferred in 1971 to Tver State University. In 2020, the university was included in the top 600 best universities in the world according to the Times THE World University Rankings 2020 and in the Top of the best universities in the world according to the Round University Ranking.

== History ==
- On December 1, 1870, it was originally opened as P. Maksimovich Tver private teachers school.
- In 1917 it was renamed to Tver Teachers Institute, and later - to Kalinin Pedagogical Institute.
- On September 1, 1971, it was reorganized into Kalinin State University.
- On February 18, 1972, in Kalinin Drama Theater saw the inauguration of Kalinin State University.
- In 1991, Kalinin State University was renamed to its current name.

== Faculties ==
The university includes 2 institutes, 12 faculties and 68 departments. TvGU has 20 scientific schools, 6 dissertation centers, the largest university library in the region and a botanical garden. The university implements 76 bachelor's degree programs, 10 specialty programs, 48 master's programs and 34 postgraduate programs.

- Faculty of Foreign Languages and International Communication
- Faculty of Philology
- Faculty of History
- Faculty of Law
- Faculty of Psychology
- Faculty of Mathematics
- Faculty of Applied Mathematics and Cybernetic
- Physico-Technical Faculty
- Faculty of Geography and Geoecology
- Faculty of Chemistry and Technology
- Faculty of Biology
- Faculty of Physical Education
- Institute of Economics and Management
- Institute of Pedagogical Education and Social Technology

== Notable alumni and staff ==
- Andrey Dementyev, poet.
- Natalya Terentyeva, cross-country skiing, gold medalist of the 2018 Olympic Games.
- Yekaterina Duntsova, politician and journalist.
- Leonid Dushkin, rocket engineer.
- Andrey A. Fedorov, biologist, botanist, taxonomist and phytogeographer.
- Irina Popova, photographer.
- Adakhan Madumarov, Kyrgyz lawyer, historian, and politician.
- Lyudmila Skakovskaya, politician.
- Nikolay Kun, historian, writer, and educator.
- Dmitry Mishin, physicist.
- Alexei Pavlov, geologist and paleontologist.

== Gallery ==
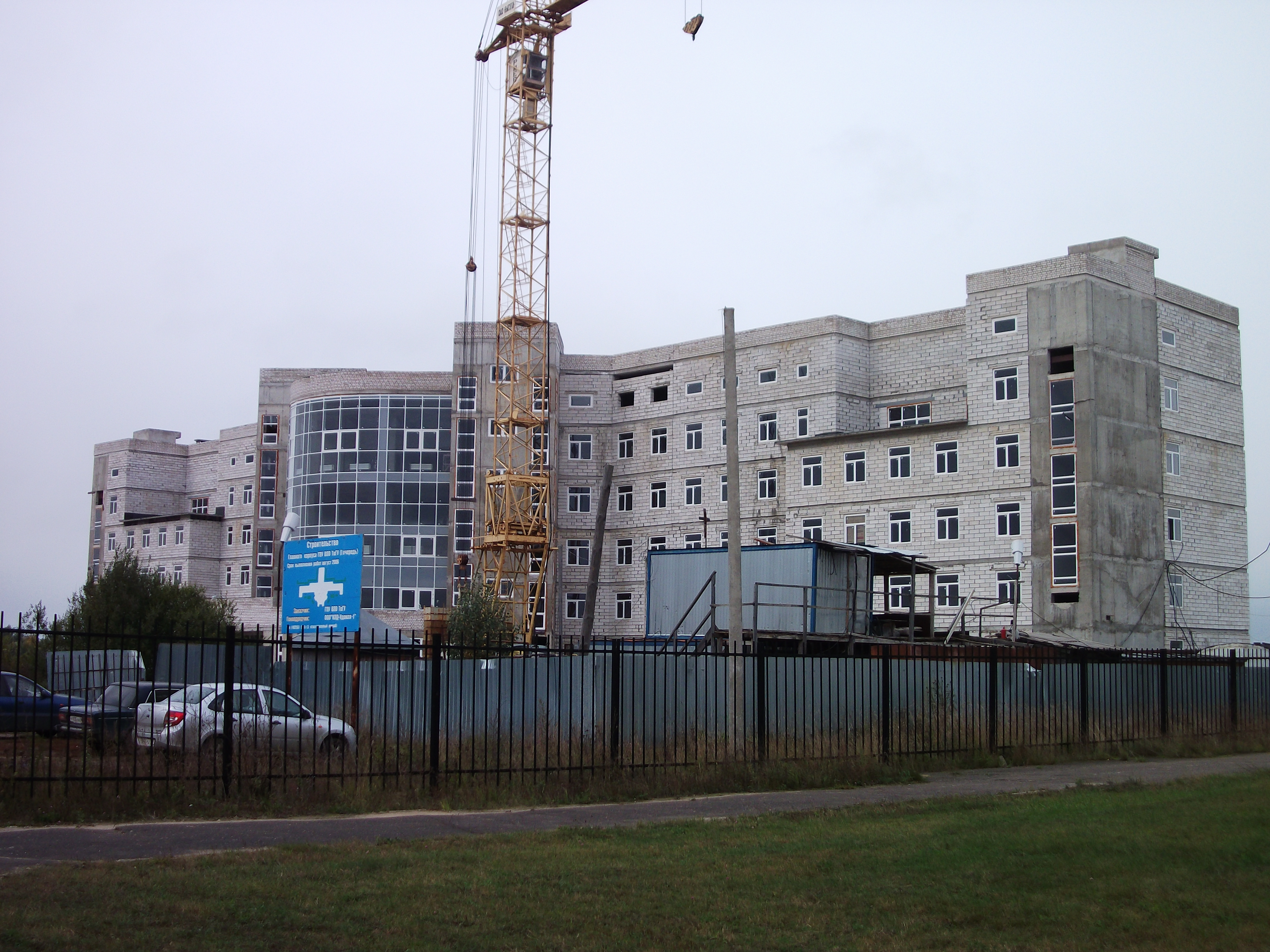
TvGU main building under construction

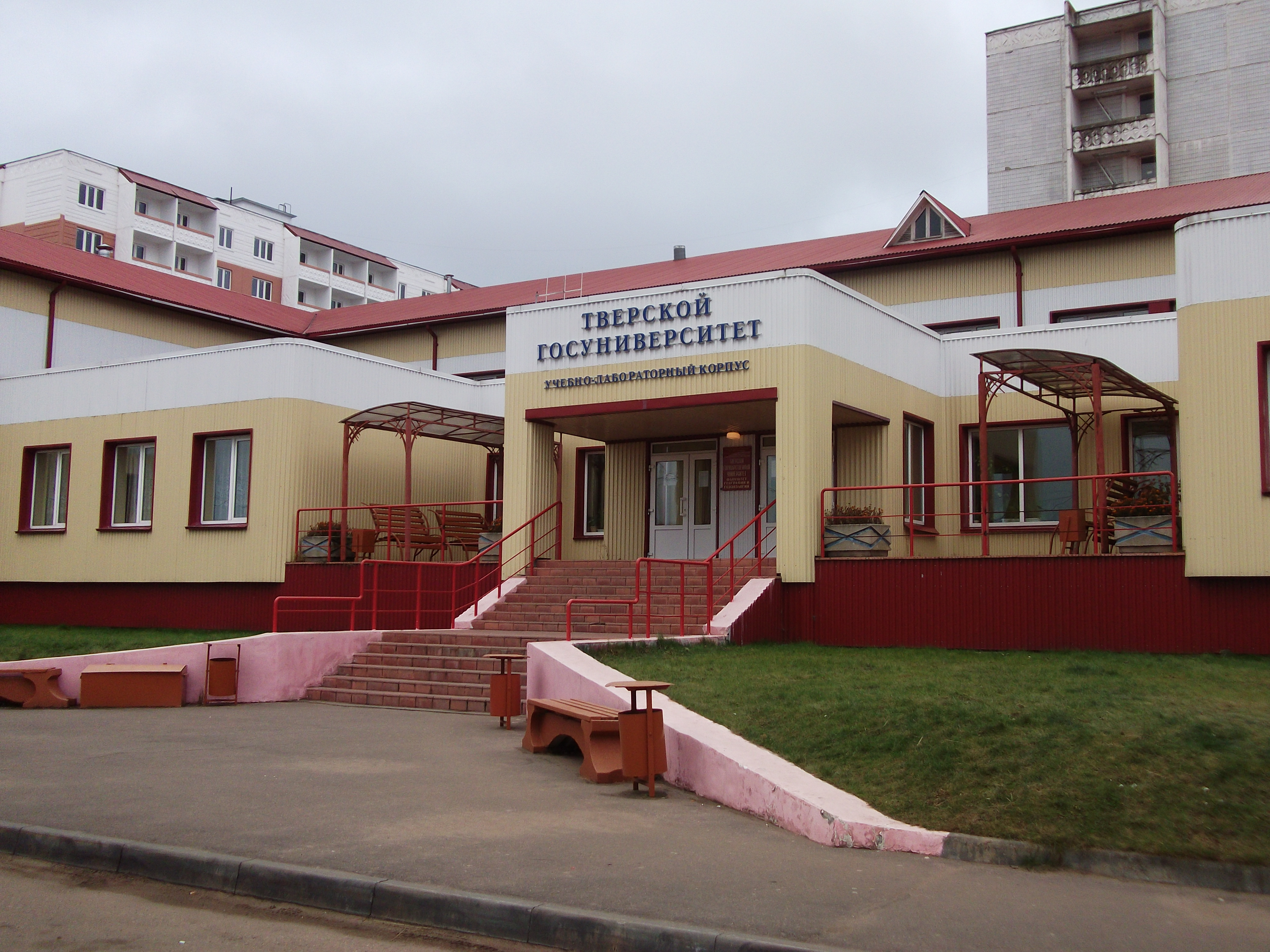
University laboratory

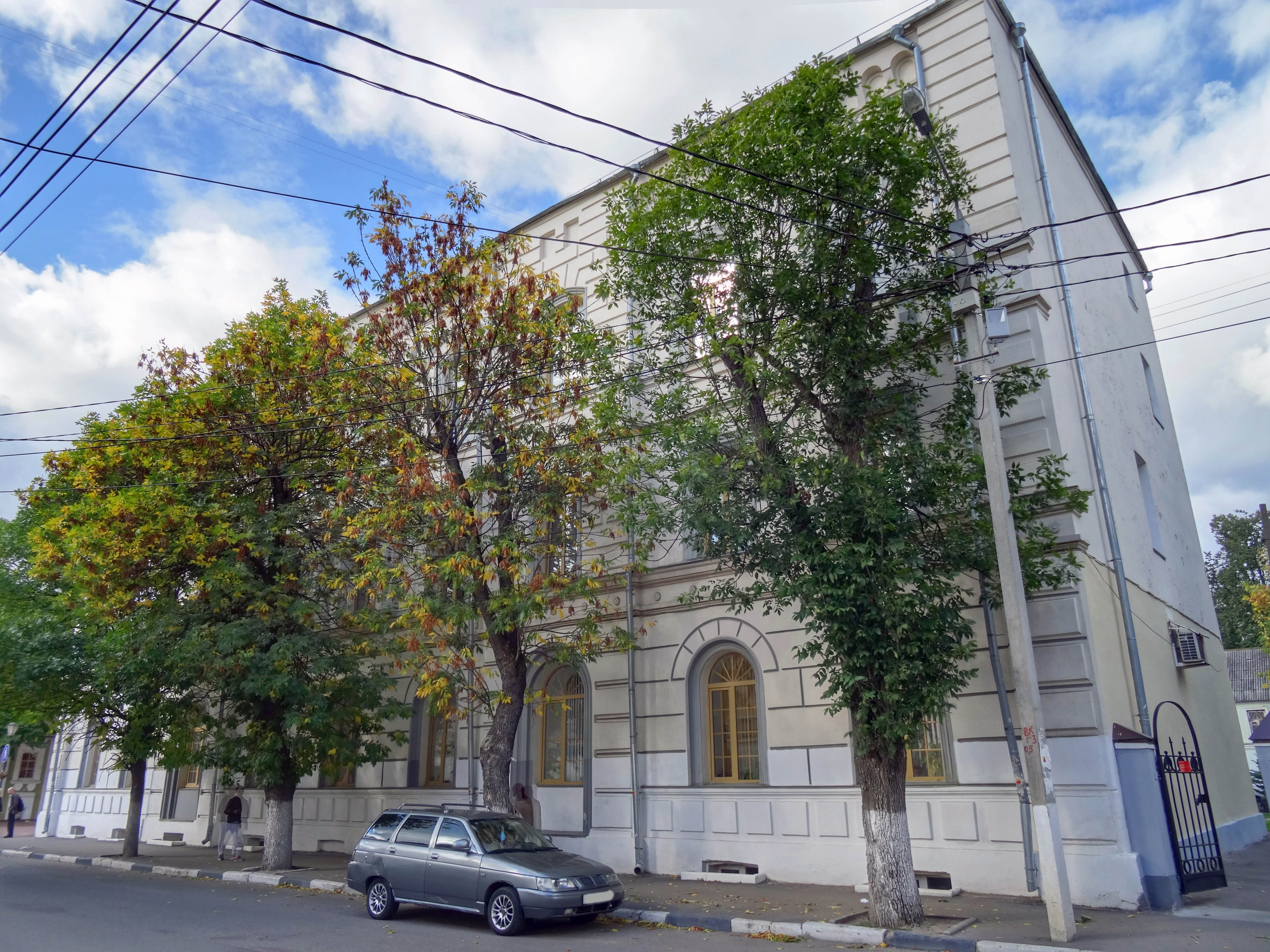
Maksimovich School, now — Faculty of History

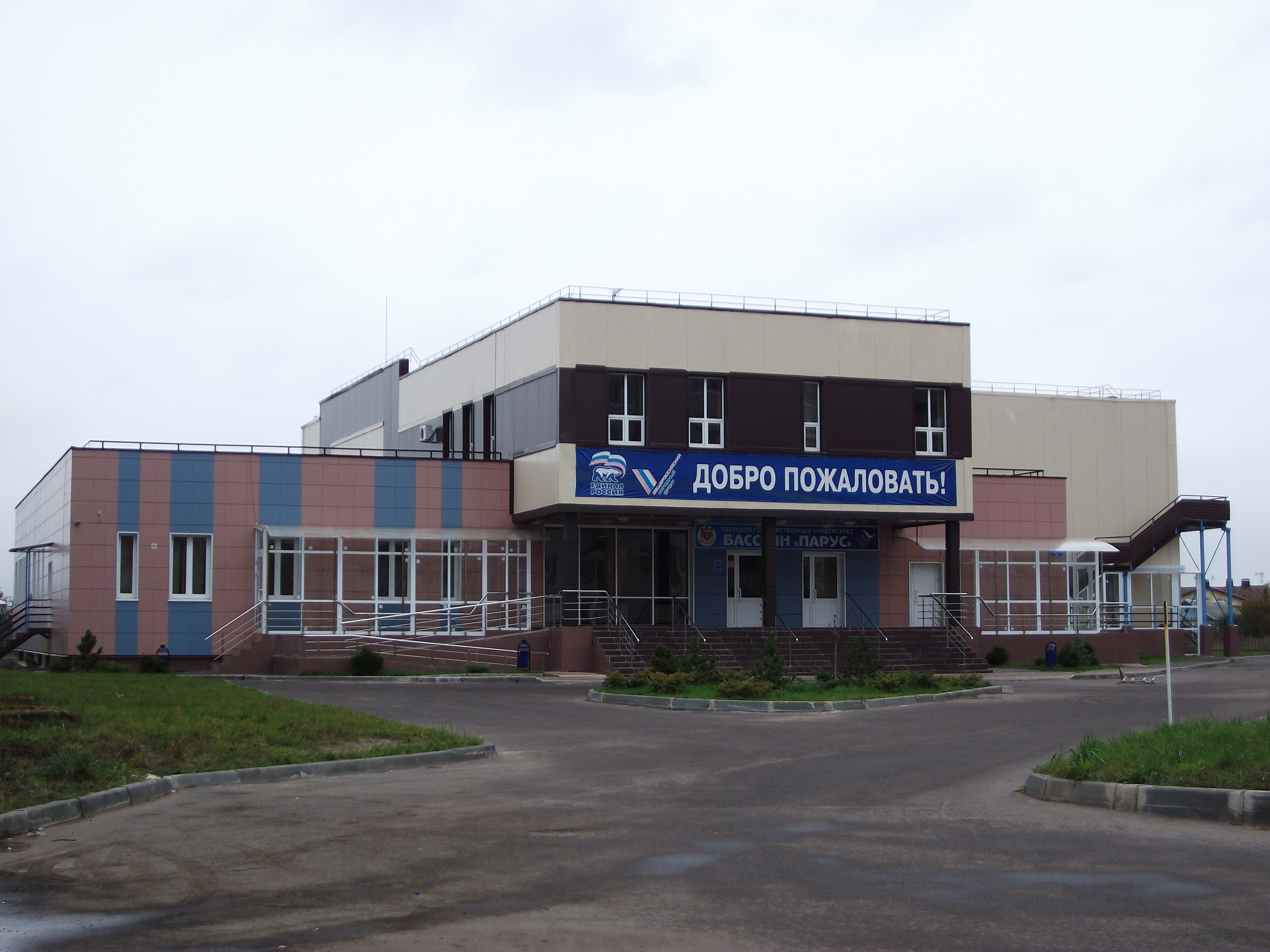
University pool «Parus»

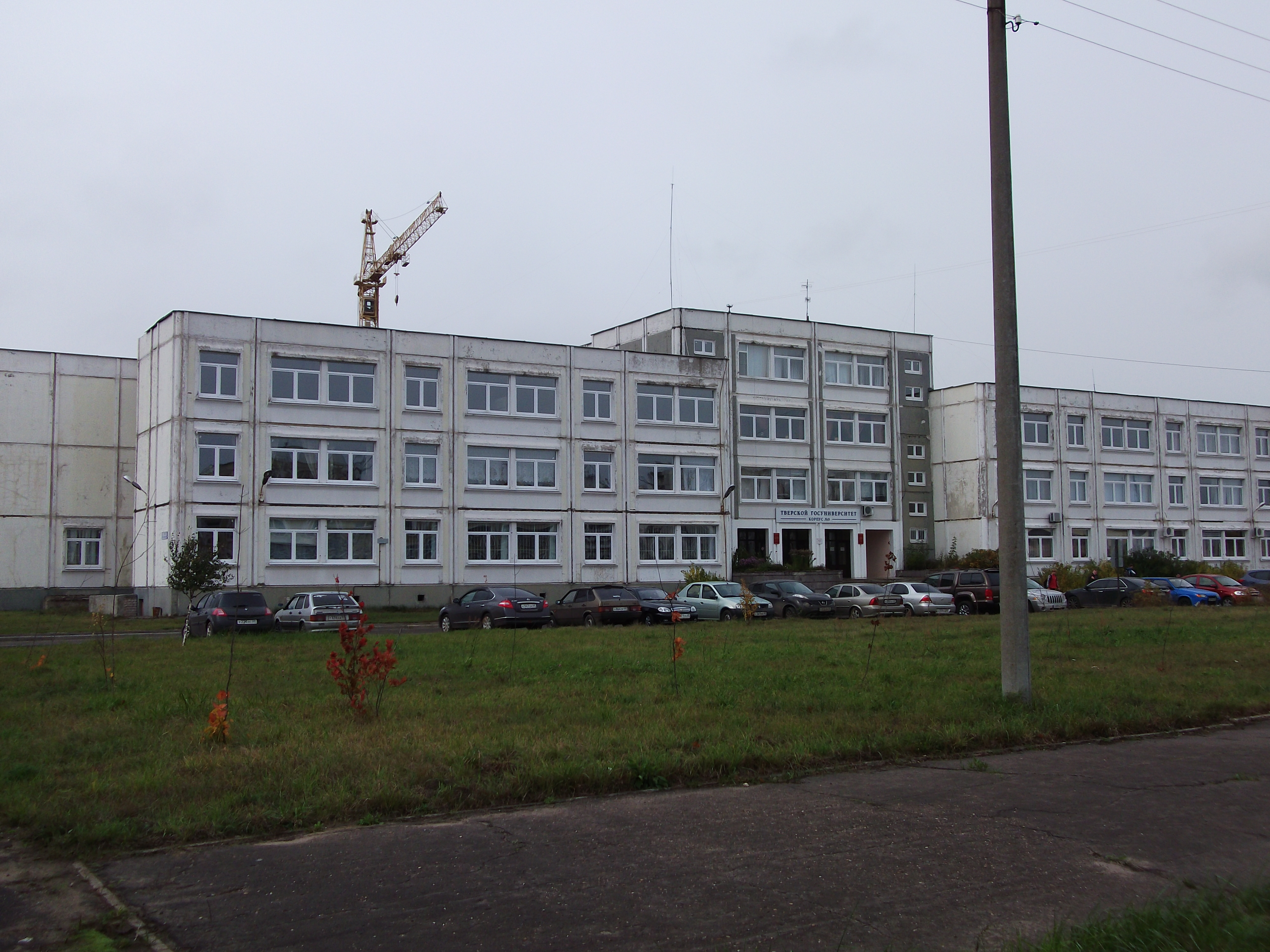
Institute of Pedagogical Education and Social Technology

== See also ==
- Botanical Garden of Tver State University
- Category:Tver State University alumni
