= VILAR Botanical Garden =

Botanical garden in Moscow, Russia

- Ботанический сад ВИЛАР
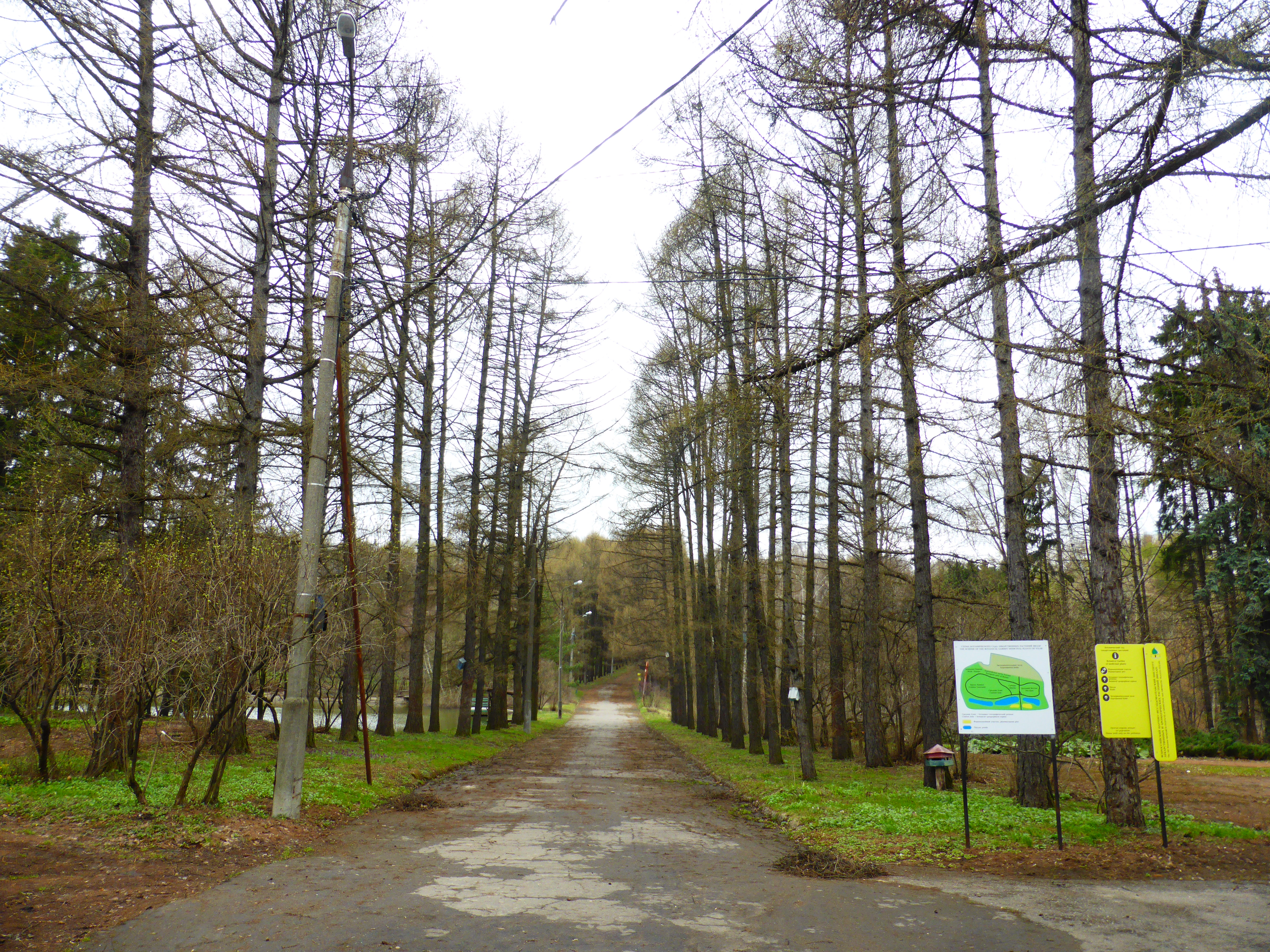
- Location: Moscow, Russia
- Coordinates: 55°33′52″N 37°35′30″E
- Completion date: 1951

The VILAR Botanical Garden (Russian: Ботанический сад ВИЛАР) is a Botanical Garden in Moscow at the All-Russian Research Institute of Medicinal and Aromatic Plants. It is located in the south of the city in the area of Northern Butovo. It was founded in 1951. The garden area is about 30 hectares (or 45 hectares, counting the territory of the institute). Botanical Garden VILAR has the status of a specially protected natural area of federal significance.

== History and description ==
The botanical garden of the All-Union Scientific Research Institute of Medicinal and Aromatic Plants (Russian: ВИЛАР) was established in accordance with the order of the Council of Ministers of the USSR of October 30, 1951, and was planted between 1952 and 1960. The garden is located on the territory of the forest protective park of Moscow.

The main task of the garden was the conservation of rare species of medicinal plants, as well as the search and introduction of new species. Proceeding from the botanical-geographical principle, several departments were organized in the garden: 1) the Far East, 2) Eastern and Western Siberia, 3) Central Asia, 4) the Crimea and the Caucasus, 5) the European part of the USSR. Small plots were allocated for the flora of Western Europe, overseas Asia and North America. In the botanical garden, a department of pharmacopoeial plants was also established, located in the plots for pharmacological reasons, and a department of subtropical and tropical medicinal plants grown in greenhouses and greenhouses. In the botanical garden, a school was established to grow seedlings and fields for the introduction of new plant species.

In the 1970s, in the Botanic Stream (tributary of the Bitza River) flowing through the territory of the garden, three ponds were constructed, in two of which fish were launched. There is organized paid fishing. Caught lin, carp, trout, perch, cupid.

During the hurricane of 1998, the botanical garden was seriously damaged, about 280 trees were felled. In 2011, due to the icy rain killed about 140 trees.

According to data for 2011, in the botanical garden in the open ground grows more than 1300 species of plants, and in the greenhouse complex - about 500 species. Here students practice pharmacists, as well as future landscape designers. In summer, excursions are given in the botanical garden, and in winter excursions take place in the greenhouse.
