= Polyus Scientific Research Institute =

Russian research institute

- Company type: Joint-stock company
- Founded: 1962
- Headquarters: Moscow, Russia
- Parent: Shvabe Holding
- Website: polyus.info

Polyus (Russian: Полюс) is a research institute and production association in St. Petersburg, Russia. It is part of the Shvabe Holding (Rostec group).

The Polyus Scientific Research Institute (NII Polyus) is closely associated with the Polyus Scientific Production Association (NPO Polyus), a small factory, and the Moscow Institute of Physics and Technology, all of which are located at the same address. NPO Polyus produces lasers and associated components, electronics articles, and electrovacuum devices.

NII Polyus works in the field of quantum electronics and develops and manufactures experimental models in the areas of cryoelectronics, magnetism, and electrovacuum devices. NII Polyus oversees several laboratories and production enterprises. These production enterprises are located in Moscow Oblast, Tula, Ulyanovsk, and Nizhny Novgorod Oblasts.

NII Polyus has also developed missile laser technology, including laser gyroscopes for missile nose cone guidance, various other types of solid-state multi-purpose lasers, laser components, and electro-optic equipment. It has also carried out global positioning system work with Aeroflot and MiG aircraft.

== History ==
The Polyus Scientific Research Institute was established in 1962 on the initiative of Mitrofan Fedorovich Stelmakh, a scientist and specialist in the field of superhigh frequency technology. The Polyus Scientific Research Institute has been named after Stelmakh since 2001. The objectives of the institute were to develop quantum electronics devices for military purposes, medical equipment, and other applications.

In the 1970s, the NGO Polyus association was established. It included the head institute of the Polyus Research Institute, the Ulyanovsk Radio Tube Plant, the Vladykinsky Mechanical Plant, the Bogoroditsky Plant of Technochemical Products, and the Ozersk Mechanical Plant. At that time, the NPO Polyus employed about 20,000 people.

Currently the Institute employs about 1,200 employees, including 15 doctors of sciences, more than 70 candidates of sciences, 20 graduate students, and applicants. There is a graduate school. The MIPT and MIREA have basic departments at the Polyus Scientific Research Institute. Until the mid-2000s, it was also the basic department for the MIEM.

== Products ==
The Institute develops and manufactures laser speed meters, surveillance equipment detectors, semiconductor emitters, optical modules, water treatment systems, and medical equipment.

== Directors ==
The General Director of the Institute is Evgeny Viktorovich Kuznetsov.
