= Sechenov Botanical Garden, First Moscow State Medical University =

Botanical Garden of the First Moscow State Medical University named after Sechenov
- Ботанический сад Первого МГМУ имени И. М. Сеченова
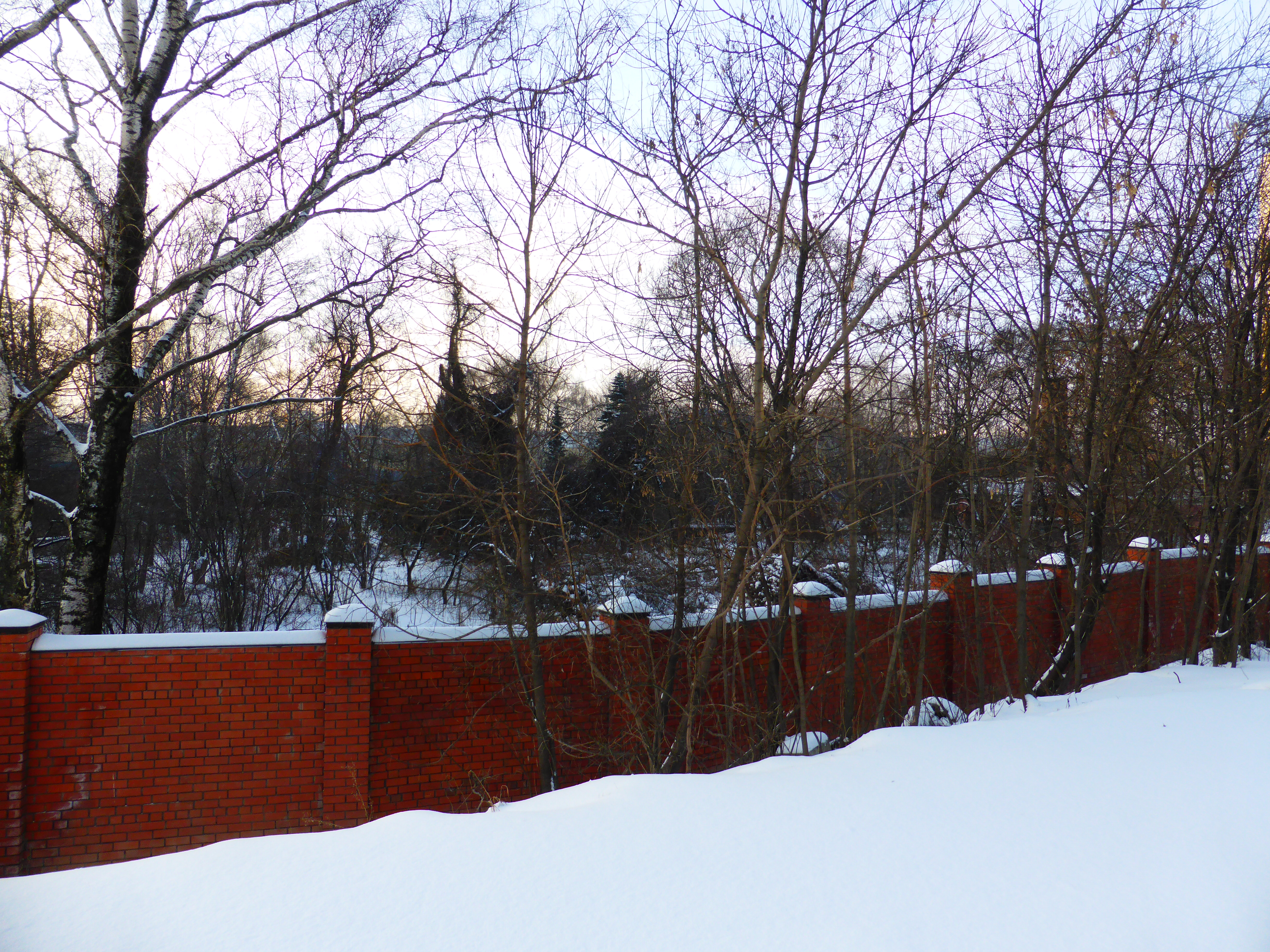
- 55°44′49″N 37°31′49″E
- Location: Moscow, Testov street, 20
- Type: Botanical Garden

The Botanical Garden of the First Moscow State Medical University named after Sechenov (Russian: Ботанический сад Первого МГМУ имени И. М. Сеченова) is a botanical garden in Moscow. Located on the left bank of the Moskva River near the station MCC "Business Center". It was founded in 1946. The garden area is 4.95 hectares. The Botanical Garden has the status of a specially protected natural area of regional importance.

== History and description ==
The Botanical Garden of the Moscow Pharmaceutical Institute (now the First Moscow State Medical University named after I. M. Sechenov) was established on September 25, 1946, as a base for students' practical training and scientific work. The garden project was designed by its first director, B. M. Giner, together with the botanist V. N. Voroshilov. The first plants were planted in the spring of 1947. By 1949, more than 100 species of wood and shrub plants were planted. In the 1950s and 1960s, geneticists and breeders A. R. Zhebrak and V. V. Sakharov carried out experiments in the botanical garden.

In 2016, the Botanical Garden was first opened for free sightseeing visits.

The area of the botanical garden is 4.95 ha, 2.5 hectares of which is occupied by the arboretum. There is also a nursery of herbaceous plants (0.5 ha) and experimental sites (0.5 ha), where medicinal plants predominate.

According to data for 2016, about 1505 species of plants grow in the botanical garden, including a rare blossoming 6 m tall Magnolia kobus. Also present is Ginkgo biloba, Meyer's fir, wolfberry, Caucasian hellebore, hydrangea petiolate and others.
