= Lytkarino Optical Glass Plant =

- Company type: Open joint-stock company
- Founded: 1934
- Headquarters: Lytkarino, Russia
- Parent: Shvabe Holding
- Website: lzos.ru

Lytkarino Optical Glass Plant (Russian: Лыткаринский завод оптического стекла) is a company based in Lytkarino, Russia and established in 1934. It is part of the Shvabe Holding of the state-owned Rostec corporation.

The Lytkarino Optical Glass Plant is a major producer of optical glass and precision optical instruments for the military as well as for the civilian market, producing night vision devices and glass laser optics.

== History ==
On October 1, 1933 Order №887/204 of the All-Union Trust of the Optical and Mechanical Industry of the People's Commissariat of Heavy Industry of the USSR (NKTP) was signed on the construction of a mirror reflector plant near the village of Lytkarino in the Ukhtomsky district of the Moscow Region (ZZO — the name of the plant before its renaming) for searchlight installations with mirrors up to 150 cm in diameter. The plant began to be built in 1934-1935.

In 1939 the unfinished plant produced its first products – five searchlight mirrors with a diameter of 1.5 meters. At that time, only factories in Leningrad and Izium produced similar products in the USSR. In the first months of the war, the USSR was left without key manufacturers of material for the production of binoculars, periscopes for submarines, anti-aircraft sights and other important optics.

Since the early 1970s the production of consumer goods and medical optics has been developing. In 1972 LZOS began to develop the production of large-sized lens lenses.

== Awards ==
- For services to the creation and production of new equipment and the successful implementation of the seven-year State Plan by Decree of the Presidium of the Supreme Soviet of the USSR dated July 7, 1966, the plant's staff was awarded the Order of the Red Banner of Labour.
- For hard work in the 9th five-year plan, the successful implementation of the State Plan in 1976, the association was awarded the Order of the October Revolution.

== Directors ==
CEO - Ignatov Alexander Nikolaevich.

== See also ==
- Rubinar
- BTA-6
