= Southern Federal University's botanical garden =

Coordinates: 47.236°N 39.655°E

- Ботанический сад Южного федерального университета (Russian)
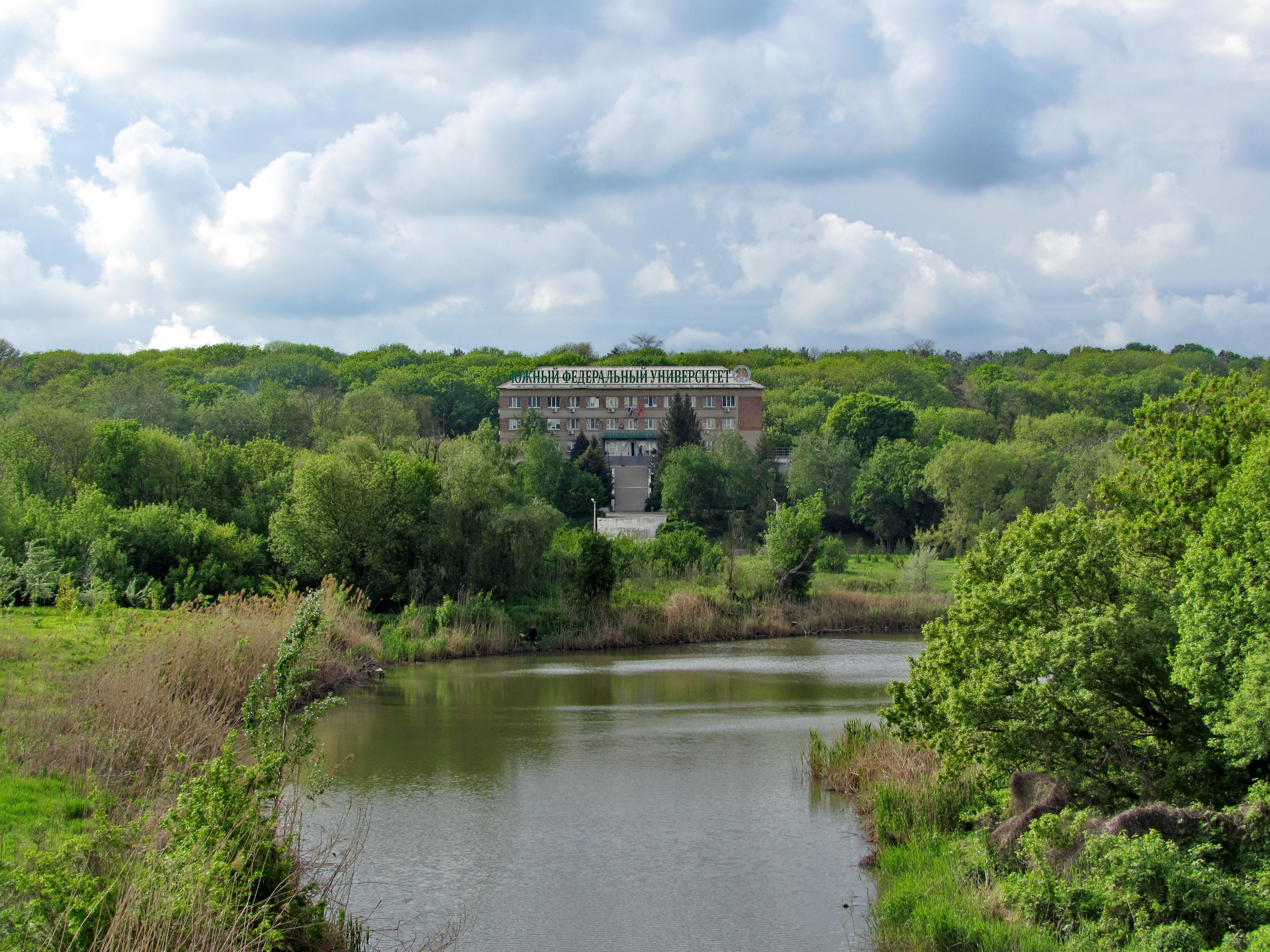

- Location within Russia
- Location: Rostov-on-Don, Rostov oblast Russia

History
- Built: 1927

Site notes
- Website: http://bg.sfedu.ru

Southern Federal University's botanical garden is located in the North-Western part in Rostov-on-Don, in the Temernik river valley. It's the first botanical garden in the vast territory of the treeless zone in the South of Russia. There is a mineral spring called St.Seraphim of Sarov on the territory of the garden, which is presented by the Directorate of the garden as an Orthodox shrine.

== History ==
The need to create a Botanical garden in the city was first discussed in 1915, after the evacuation of the University of Warsaw to Rostov-on-Don because of the danger of occupation of the Polish capital by German troops. But only in 1927, on the initiative of professors V. F. Chmielewski and V. N. Varshavskogo the city authorities have allocated for the Botanical garden 74,11 ha. Botanical garden the North Caucasus Federal University were the first on the vast territory of the treeless zone of the South of Russia. The Botanical garden appeared in 1927. The basis of the garden planning was the map of the North Caucasus. It was assumed that the main alleys and paths of the garden will correspond to the contours of the map of the region and its railway lines. Representatives of subalpine birch forests, foothills of oak forests and beech-fir planting, moved to new conditions, in the first years almost all died. By 1940, the collection Fund of the garden numbered more than a thousand plants, including hornbeam, sycamore, velvet tree.

During the German occupation, not only greenhouses, office buildings and structures were destroyed, but the collections of greenhouse and flower-decorative herbaceous plants were completely lost. The Park and the arboretum were significantly damaged. Many large trees such as oak, hornbeam, beech, pine and others were destroyed. About 100 species of garden forms were killed, which made up one third of the collection, most of the most rare deciduous and evergreen plants. In the post-war period, all the buildings and the collection Fund of the Botanical garden were fully restored.

Nowadays the Botanical garden is a state budget educational and scientific unit of the southern Federal University.

== Collection ==
Its area exceeds 200 hectares. It is home to over 6,500 species of trees, shrubs and herbaceous plants. Almost 1,600 species and forms reaches the flora collection collected in the greenhouse of tropical and subtropical cultures. Over 5,000 species of trees, shrubs and herbaceous plants grow in the greenhouses of the garden and in the open field, including the greenhouse of tropical and subtropical plants in the collection of flora of Africa, South-East Asia, North and South America, Australia which has almost 1,600 species of plants.
