= Shvabe Holding =

Electronic component producer

Shvabe
- Industry: Optics
- Founded: 2008
- Headquarters: Moscow, Russia
- Revenue: $811 million (2016)
- Operating income: $73.3 million (2016)
- Net income: $56.3 million (2016)
- Number of employees: 18,468 (2016)
- Parent: Rostec
- Website: shvabe.com

Shvabe Holding (Russian: Швабе) is a holding company within the Russian state-owned Rostec group responsible for development and production of high-tech optical-electronic systems both for military and civil purposes, manufacturing of optical, medical and energy-saving equipment.

Established in 2008, the company was known as JSC NPK Optical Systems and Technologies until October 26, 2012. Its companies manufacture electrooptical equipment, devices and defence systems and hi-tech civil products, such as systems for surveillance, aerospace monitoring and remote sensing, laser systems and facilities, distance gauges, target finders, photolithographic systems, precision elements and nanounits, medical equipment, surveying instruments, lighting equipment and much more. Shvabe manufactures about 6,000 product units supplied to 83 countries.

Since 2011, the holding company is registered in Yekaterinburg.

According to Rostec’s plans in 2013, Shvabe will launch an IPO within four or five years.

== Structure ==
Companies of the holding:

- Krasnogorsky Zavod
- Lytkarino Optical Glass Factory
- NCLSK Astrophysika
- NPO Orion
- Novosibirsk Instrument-Building Plant
- Polyus Scientific Research Institute
- Research and technological institute of optical materials all-Russia scientific center "S.I.Vavilov State Optical Institute"
- Scientific and Production Association "Optica"
- Urals Optical & Mechanical Plant
- Vavilov State Optical Institute
- Vologda Optical-Mechanical Plant
- Zagorsk Optical-Mechanical Plant
- State Institute for Applied Optics, Kazan
- MZ Sapfir
- Precision Instrument Engineering Construction Bureau
- Shvabe Tech Lab, Kazan (before 2014 - TSKB "Photon" OJSC)
