= Novosibirsk Instrument-Building Plant =

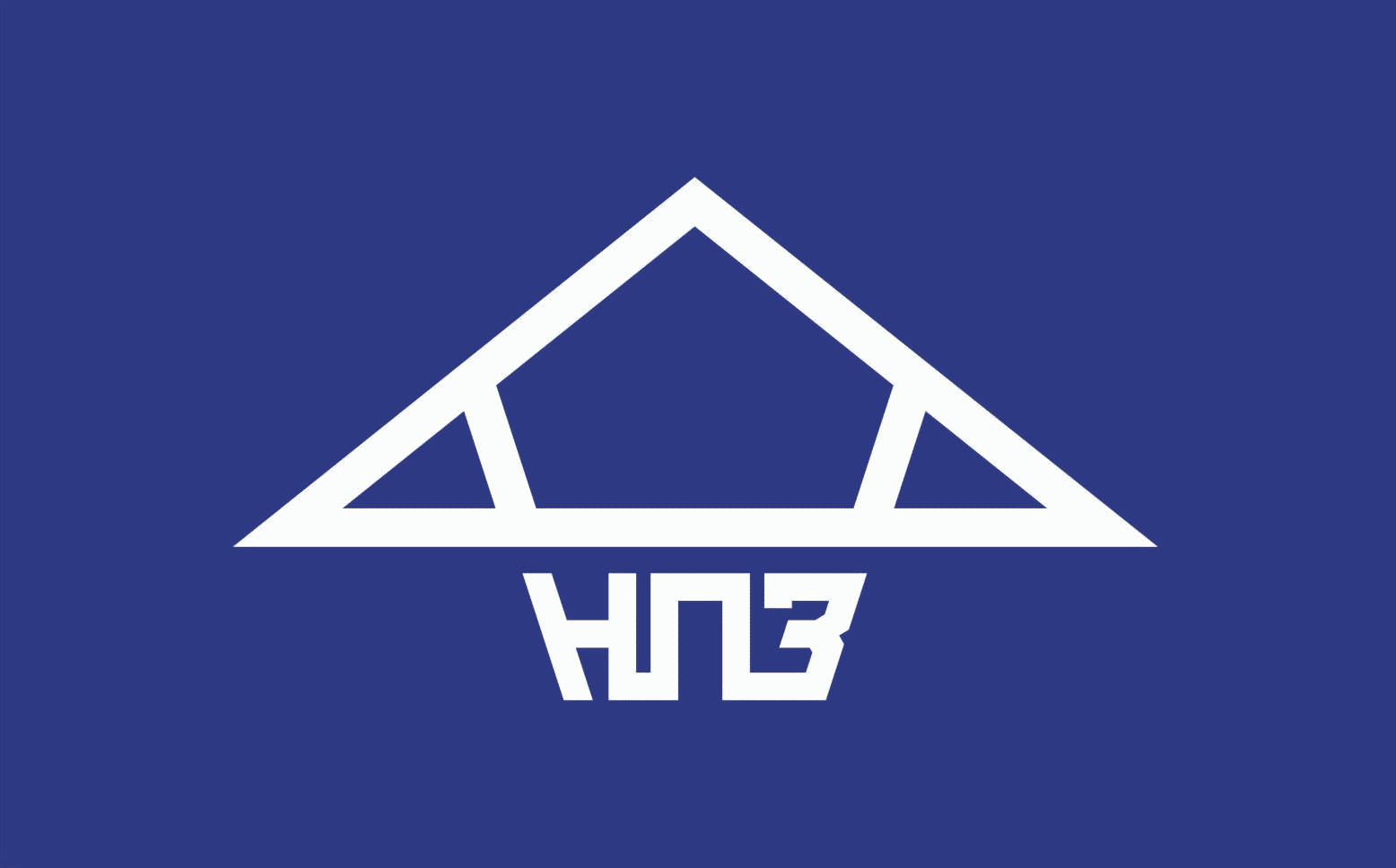
- Native name: Новосибирский приборостроительный завод (НПЗ)
- Industry: Optical instruments
- Founded: 1905
- Headquarters: Novosibirsk, Russia
- Key people: Anton Sergeyevich Klokov (CEO)
- Products: Telescopes, optical gun sights, telescope mounts, fire-control systems, laser sights
- Parent: Shvabe Holding
- Website: npzoptics.ru

Novosibirsk Instrument-Building Plant (NPZ; Russian: Новосибирский приборостроительный завод, НПЗ) is an optical instruments company based in Novosibirsk, Russia. It has been a part of the Shvabe Holding since 2014.

The Novosibirsk Instrument-Building Plant produces optical instruments for both civilian and military usage, including telescopes, Optical gun sights, industrial automation equipment, spare parts for agriculture and consumer products, and miscellaneous optical equipment. It was formerly part of the Concern "Optoprom" until becoming a joint-stock company in 2011.

== Products ==
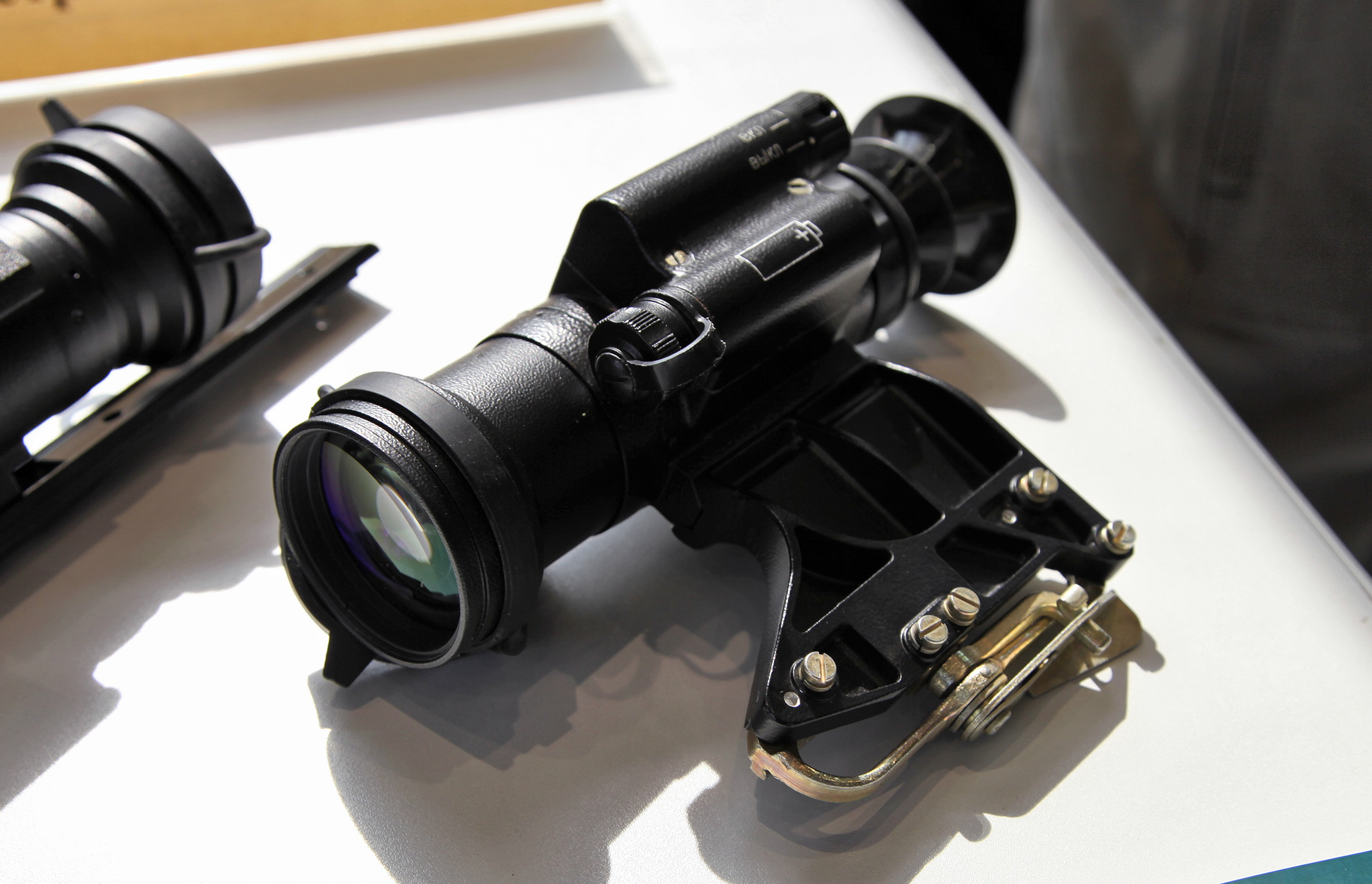
1PN93-2 night vision sight manufactured by Novosibirsk Instrument-Building Plant.

- Day and night Optical gun sights: PU, «Antisniper», SPP, NSPU, 1PN58 etc.;
- Laser sights: CLN-1K and CLN-2K.
- Fire-control system for armored vehicles (T-80, T-90 etc.) and self-propelled artillery (Akatsiya, Msta-S, Nona etc.);
- Tank commander's devices;
- Instrument complexes of round-the-clock intelligence;
- Equatorial mounts for telescopes;
- Catadioptric telescopes of the original Yuri Andreyevich Klevtsov system, with apertures 150, 200 and 250 mm (TAL-150K, TAL-200K, TAL-250K);
- Achromatic refracting telescopes with apertures 75, 100 and 125 mm, apochromatic refracting telescopes on plain glasses 125 and 150 mm, classical apochromats — refractors 200 mm;
- Reflectors with aperture 65 («Alcor»), 110 («Mizar»), 150 mm;

== Awards ==
- 1939 — Named after Lenin.
- 1945 — Order of Lenin by decree of the Supreme Soviet of the USSR on July 9, 1945.
- 1971 — Order of the Red Banner of Labour by decree of the Supreme Soviet of the USSR on January 18, 1971.
- 2001 — Novosibirsk Oblast Administration Award for Quality.
- 2003 — Gold medal of the American-Russian Chamber of Commerce and Industry (ARCCI).
