= Urals Optical-Mechanical Plant =

Russian optical and electronic equipment manufacturer

- Company type: Joint-stock company
- Founded: 1941
- Headquarters: Yekaterinburg, Russia
- Number of employees: 2,430 (2020)
- Parent: Shvabe Holding
- Website: www.uomz.ru

Urals Optical-Mechanical Plant (Russian: Уральский оптико-механический завод) is a company based in Yekaterinburg, Russia. It is part of the Shvabe Holding (Rostec group).

The Urals Optical-Mechanical Plant Production Association is one of Russia's leading optical enterprises, producing optical systems for military aircraft. Products include bomb aiming systems, laser distance measuring systems, and optical laser systems for the MiG-29 Fulcrum, Su-27 Flanker, and Tu-160 Blackjack military aircraft.

== Owners ==
The company has two shareholders: 77.46% of the shares belong to Rostec State Corporation, 22.54% belong to the Russian Federation, represented by the Federal Agency for State Property Management.

== Directors ==
- 1933-1938 — Gorshkov Ivan Vasilyevich
- 1939-1947 — Safronov Victor Osipovich
- 1947-1949 — Alenichev Sergey Vasilyevich
- 1949-1953 — Andreev Alexandr Petrovich
- 1953-1986 — Kornilov Ivan Mikhailovich
- 1986-2005 — Yalamov Eduard Spiridonovich
- 2005-2015 — Maksin Sergey Valerievich
- since 2016 — Sludnykh Anatoly Vladimirovich

=== The Board of Directors ===
Chairman of the Board of Directors: Litvin Vladimir Zalmanovich, Head of the Department of Corporate Procedures and Property Complex of Rostec Corporation;

Members of the Board of Directors

- Kirill Andreevich Gaidash is Head of the Department of Financial and Economic Policy of Rostec Corporation;
- Roy Igor Vladimirovich is Head of the Department of Industrial Assets of Rostec Corporation;
- Kudashkin Vladimir Vasilyevich is the Head of the Legal Department of Rostec Corporation;
- Anatoly Vladimirovich Sludnykh is the General Director of the Ural Optical and Mechanical Plant.
