= Scientific production association =

Research, design, and manufacturing organizations in the USSR and its successor states

A scientific production association (Russian: Научно-производственное объединение, romanized: Nauchno-proizvodstvennoye obyedineniye, abbr. NPO) is a type of integrated research-and-production organization that originated in the Soviet Union and continues to exist in Russia and other successor states. Such associations combine scientific research, engineering design, technology development, and industrial production within a single structure, typically including research institutes, design bureaus, and manufacturing plants.

Closely related organizational forms include the scientific and production enterprise (научно-производственное предприятие, Nauchno-proizvodstvennoye predpriyatiye, NPP) and the scientific and implementation enterprise (научно-внедренческое предприятие, Nauchno-vnedrencheskoye predpriyatiye, NVP).

Prominent examples of NPOs include NPO Mashinostroyeniya and NPO Almaz.

== History ==
The NPO structure first appeared in the late 1960s, after a Soviet decree was approved on 24 September 1968 to reform research and development structures; by 1980 there were 250 NPOs in the Soviet Union.

NPOs were established to consolidate research and production activities into a single entity. They were meant to bridge the technological gap between design bureaus and production plants, as new designs were often developed without considering the technical capabilities of the production facilities, leading to long delays between the start of development and serial production.

Famous examples from various NPOs
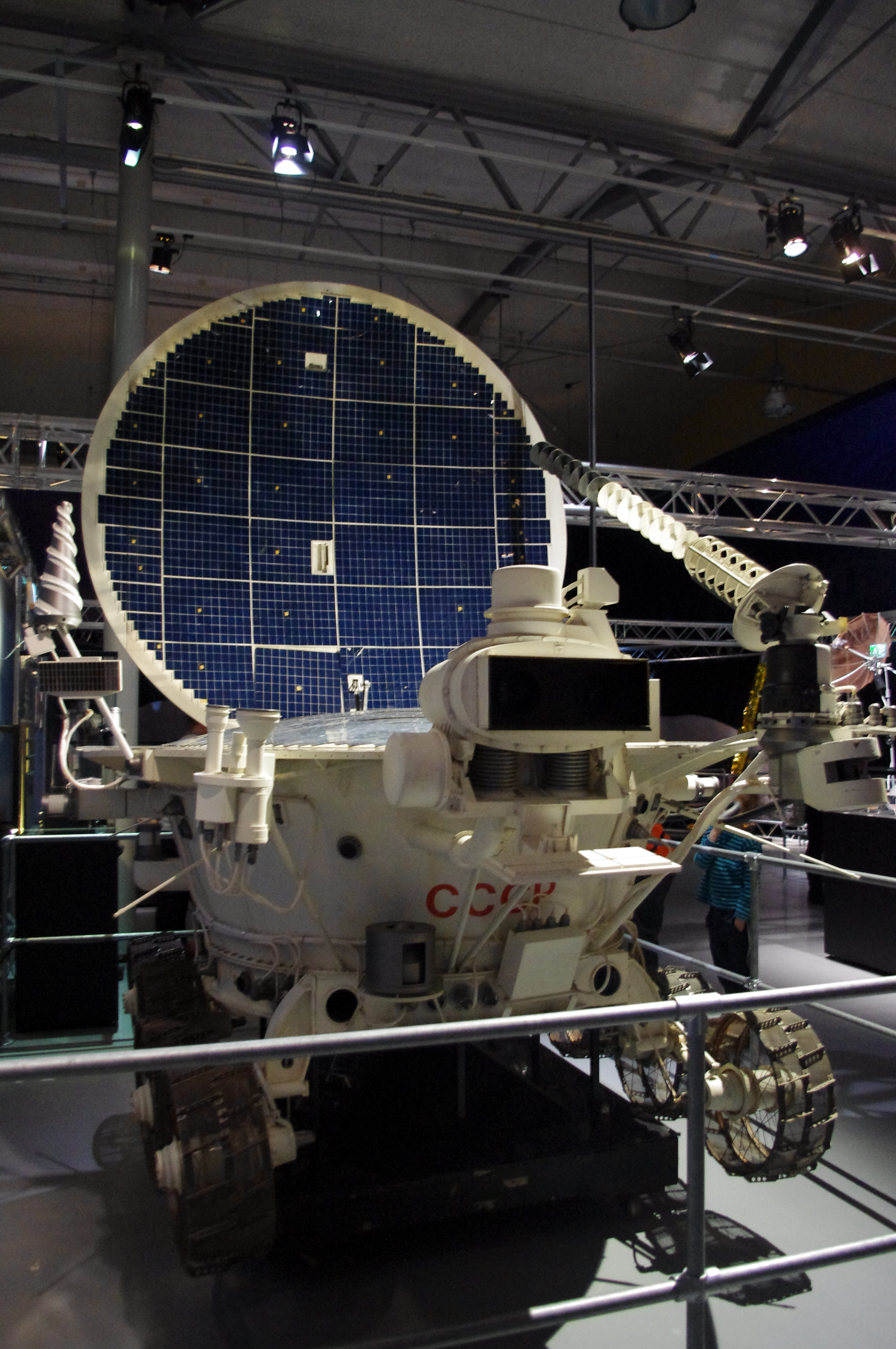
Lunokhod 1 from Lavochkin

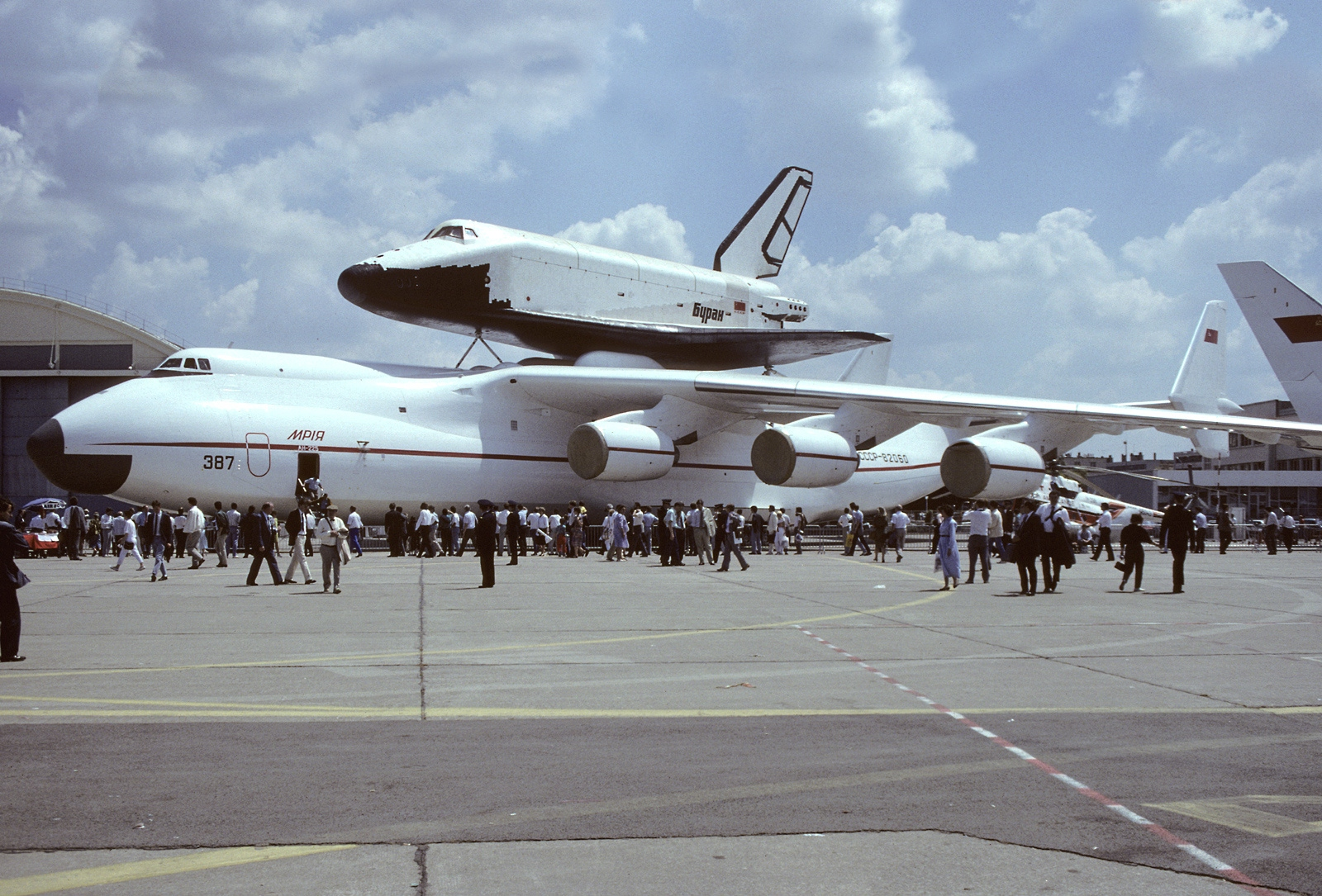
Buran from Molniya

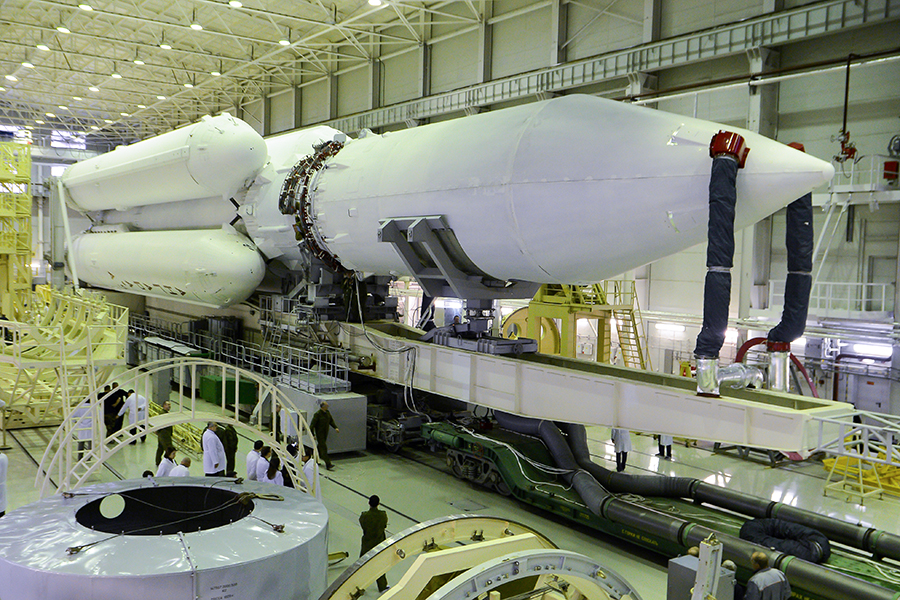
Angara from Polyot

They are usually headed by a research or design organization. Though they exist in many sectors, they are most common in electrical engineering, electronics, aviation, instrument-making and chemical industries.

Research and production association (abb. NPO), also a research and production enterprise (abb. NPP; научно-производственное предприятие (НПП)) is an organization of any organizational and legal form that conducts research and development along with their development in production and production. As a rule, the structure of the NPO includes research, design and engineering, technological organizations, pilot production and industrial enterprises.

== List of NPOs ==
- NPO Altair
- NPO Almaz
- NPO Antey
- NPO Biosintez
- NPO Electropribor (Kharkiv, Ukraine)
- NPO Energomash (Moscow)
- NPO ELSIB (Novosibirsk)
- NPO Novator (Yekaterinburg)
- NPO Almaz (Moscow)
- NPO Avtomatiki (Yekaterinburg)
- NPO Lavochkin (Khimki)
- NPO Luch (Novosibirsk)
- NPO Luch (Podolsk)
- NPO Mashinostroyeniya (Reutov)
- NPO Molniya (Moscow)
- NPO NIIIP-NZiK (Novosibirsk)
- NPO Orion (Moscow)
- NPO Petrovax (Moscow)
- NPO Polyot (Omsk)
- NPO Splav (Tula)
- NPO Tekhnomash (Moscow)
- NPO Toriy (Moscow)
- NPO Trud/Kusnetsov (Samara)
- NPO Yuzhnoye (Dnipro) designers of the R-12 Dvina rocket

== List of NVPs ==
- NVP Protek

== See also ==
- Production association
