= National Space Centre (Moscow) =

Office and manufacturing complex

V.V. Tereshkova National Space Centre
- Национальный космический центр имени Первой в мире женщины-космонавта В.В. Терешковой

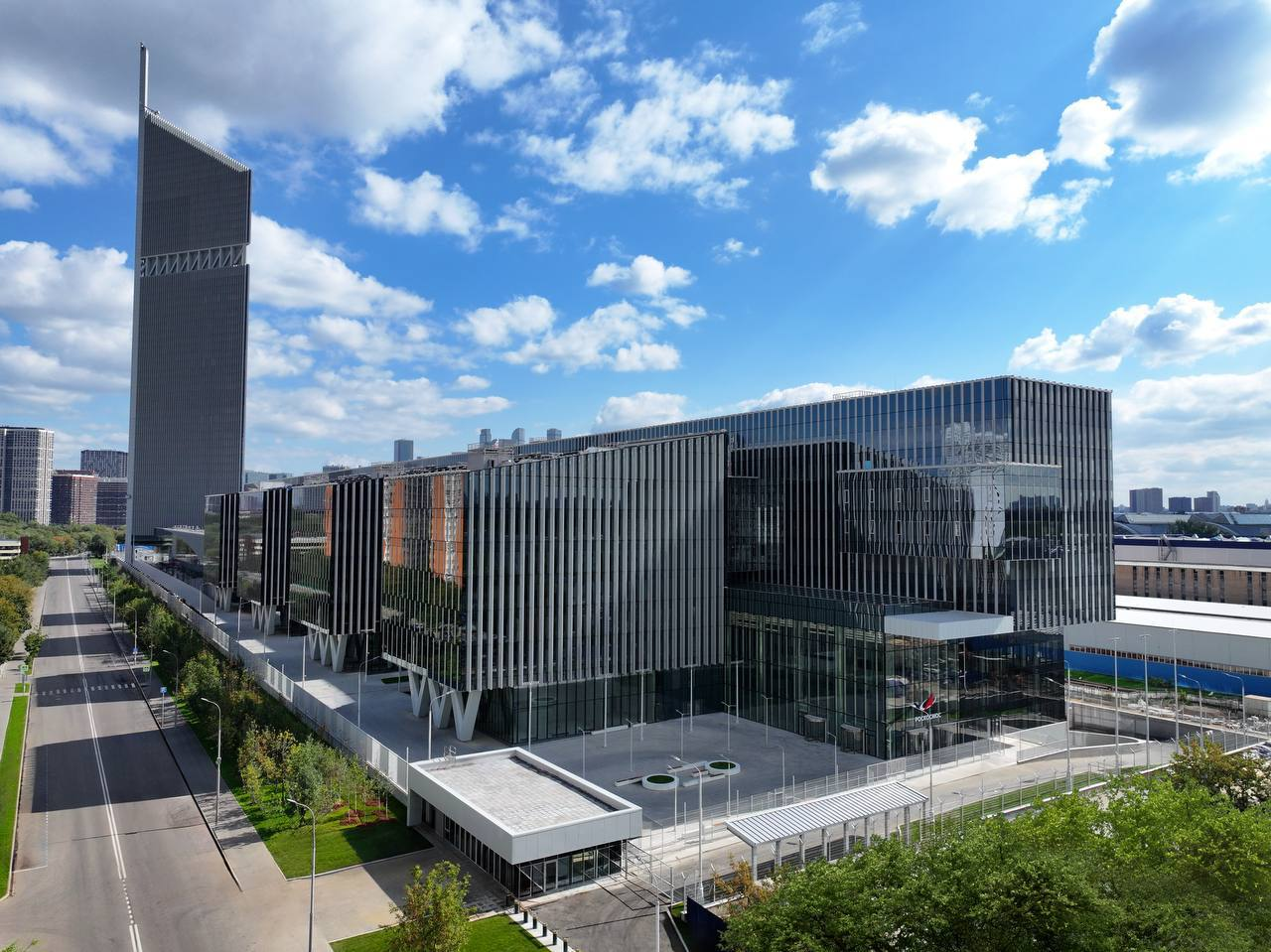
- The National Space Centre, shortly before opening in September 2025
- Interactive map of the V.V. Tereshkova National Space Centre area
- Alternative names: NCC/НКЦ

General information
- Location: Moscow, Russia
- Coordinates: 55°45′36″N 37°29′24″E
- Groundbreaking: 2019
- Opened: 13 September 2025
- Owner: Roscosmos

Height
- Antenna spire: 288.1 m (945 ft)
- Roof: 248.9 m (817 ft)

Technical details
- Floor count: 47
- Floor area: 250,000 m^{2} (2,700,000 sq ft)

The V.V. Tereshkova National Space Centre (NSC, Russian: Национальный космический центр имени Первой в мире женщины-космонавта В.В. Терешковой) is a space industry complex in Moscow that opened on 13 September 2025. Named after Valentina Tereshkova, the former Soviet cosmonaut and first woman in space, the facility houses the headquarters of Roscosmos, Moscow Mission Control, and offices for 18 additional space-sector companies, with the aim of consolidating the space industry of Russia in a single location. The complex, which includes a large office tower and manufacturing facilities, is adjacent to the Khrunichev State Research and Production Space Centre.

== Characteristics ==
The National Space Centre is designed to bring together, under one roof, 18 of Moscow's 30 design bureaus and space industry manufacurers, bringing in about 12,000 new employees; together with the 8,000 employees of the pre-existing Khrunichev Centre, the site will house around 20,000 workers. The Centre will be part of the special economic zone known as "Technopolis Moscow", which combines industrial and technological parks in the capital. In addition to Roscosmos, which will place its main offices in the complex, space companies such as United Rocket and Space Corporation (ORKK), TsENKI, Glavkosmos, and other corporations also have offices here.

The Roscosmos offices will be located in a glass tower with a total area of 250,000 square meters. The tower will be 200 meters tall and is designed as a triangular high-rise with horizontal structures attached to it.

== Purpose ==
The concentration of factories and enterprises in the aerospace industry is intended to create a synergistic effect from increased interaction and collaboration, creating a qualitatively new working environment and reducing the economic costs associated with fragmented enterprises.

== History ==
The idea of creating the National Space Centre was proposed in 2018 by Dmitry Rogozin, then the General Director of Roscosmos. Russian President Vladimir Putin announced the plan in February 2019, while locating the complex on the Khrunichev Centre grounds was suggested by the Mayor of Moscow, Sergei Sobyanin.

Construction was carried out by the construction and engineering holding company Mosinzhproekt, and began in 2019. The project was scheduled for completion in 2024, with industrial organizations moving to the new complex by 2025.

On 16 October 2025, Sobyanin signed a decree naming the NSC after Valentina Tereshkova.

== Gallery ==
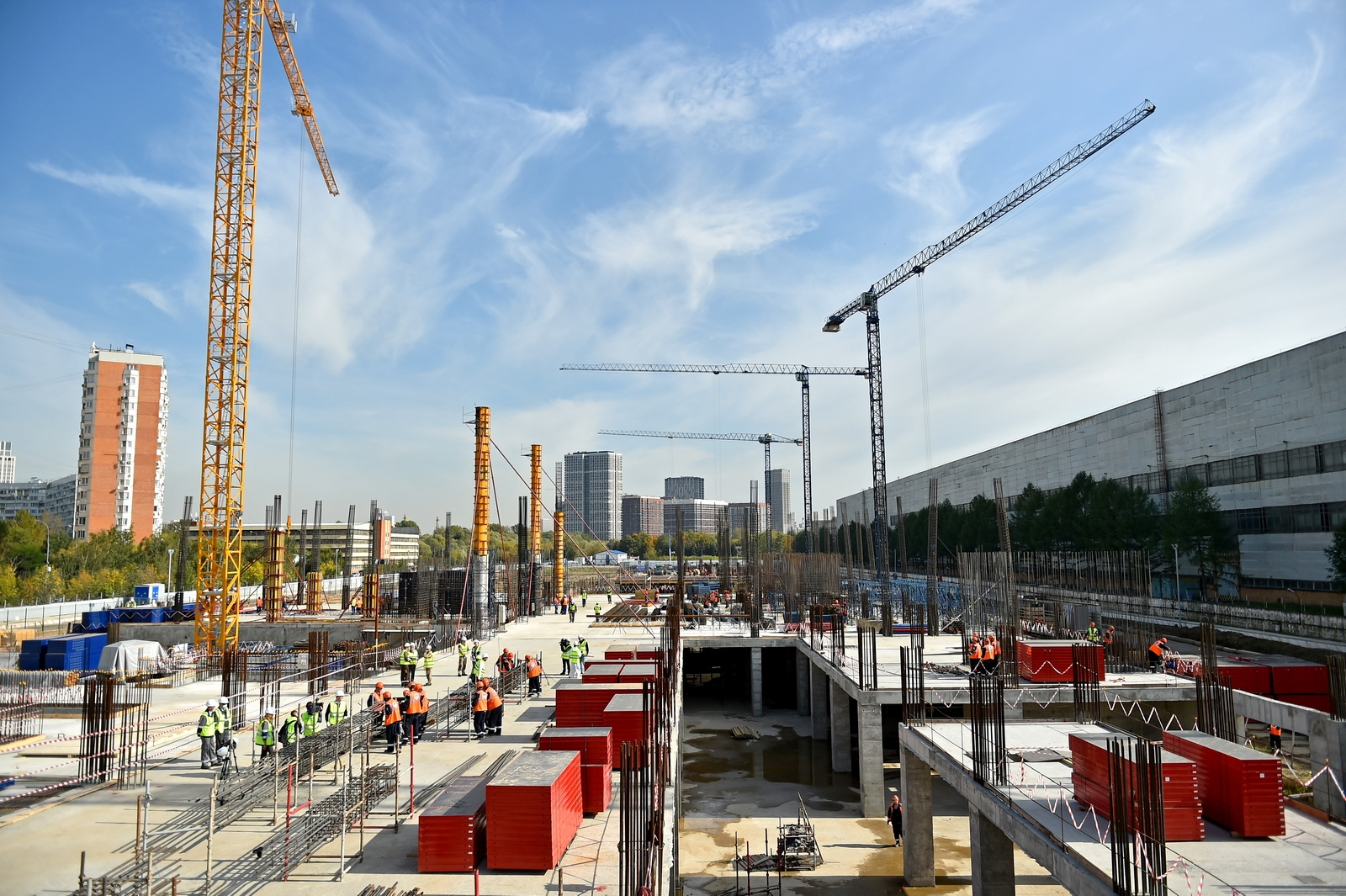
Construction progress as of September 2020

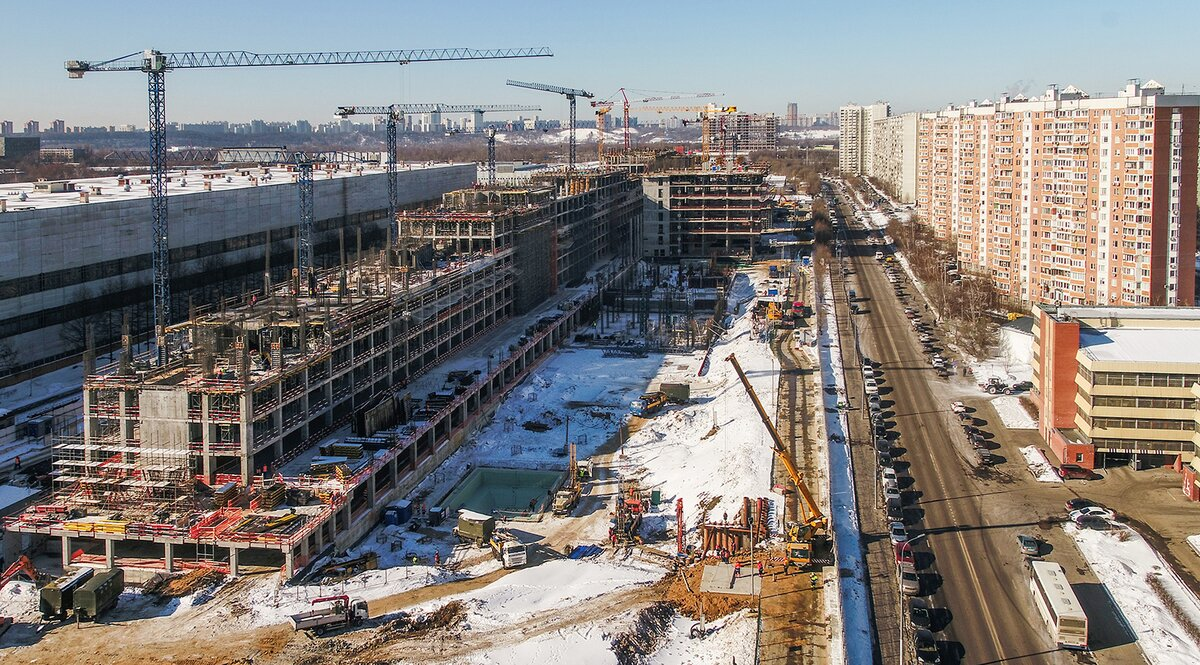
Construction progress as of March 2021

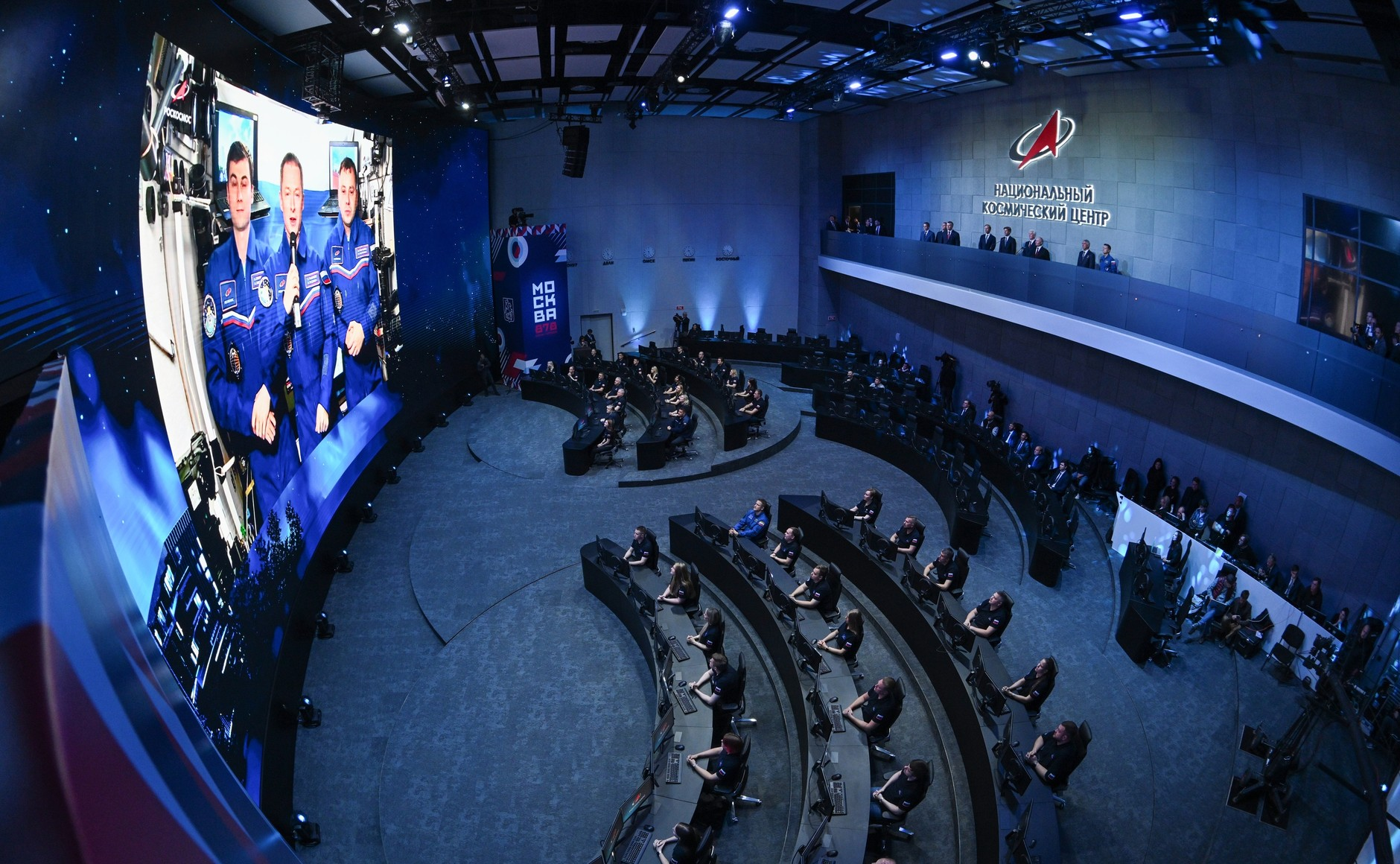
Mission control center
