= Space industry of Russia =

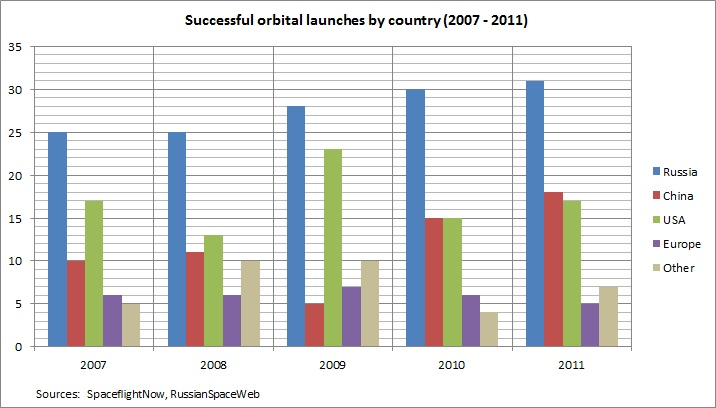
Successful orbital launches from 2007 to 2011 based on logs by SpaceFlightNow and RussianSpaceWeb. In these years, organisations such as NASA and ESA opted to launch certain space missions from sites such as Plesetsk Cosmodrome in Russia or Baikonur Cosmodrome in Kazakhstan due to geographical considerations.

The space industry of the Russian Federation, as of 2006, comprised over 100 companies, and employed 250,000 people. Most of the companies were descendants of Soviet design bureau and state production companies. The industry entered a deep crisis following the dissolution of the Soviet Union, with its fullest effect occurring in the last years of the 1990s. Funding of the space program declined by 80% and the industry lost a large part of its work force before recovery began in the early 2000s. Many companies survived by creating joint-ventures with foreign firms and marketing their products abroad.

In the mid-2000s, as part of the general improvement in the economy, funding of the country's space program was substantially increased and a new ambitious federal space plan was introduced, resulting in a great boost to the industry. Its largest company was RKK Energiya, the main crewed space flight contractor. Leading launch vehicle producers were Khrunichev and TsSKB-Progress. The largest satellite developer was ISS Reshetnev, while NPO Lavochkin was the main developer of interplanetary probes.

As of 2013, a major reorganization of the Russian space industry was underway, with increased state supervision and involvement of the ostensibly private companies formed in the early 1990s following the dissolution of the Soviet Union.

Russian Space Industry at 9th Bengaluru Space Expo 2026, BIEC

== History ==
=== Post-Soviet adjustments ===
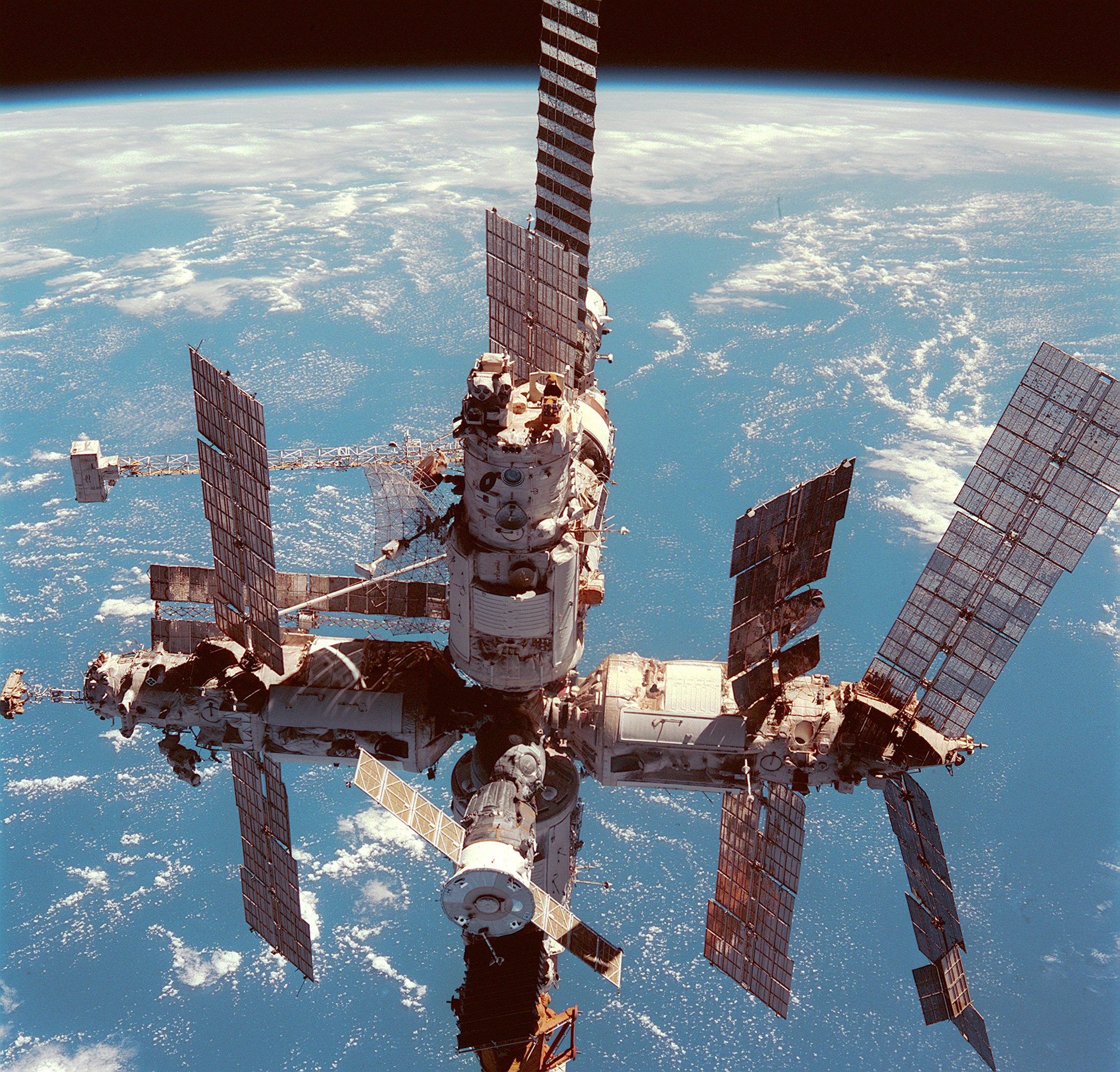
The Mir space station in 1998

The space industry of the Soviet Union was a formidable, capable and well-funded complex, which scored a number of great successes. Spending on the space program peaked in 1989, when its budget totaled 6.9 billion rubles, amounting to 1.5% of the Soviet Union's gross domestic product. During the perestroika period of the late 1980s, the space program's funding began to decrease, and this was seriously accelerated by the economic hardships of the 1990s. The Russian Federation inherited the major part of the infrastructure and companies of the Soviet program (while others, such as Yuzhnoye Design Bureau, became Ukrainian), but found itself unable to continue the appropriate level of financing. By 1998, the space program's funding had been cut by 80%.

To coordinate the country's space activities, on 25 February 1992, the Russian Federal Space Agency was created. During Soviet times, there had been no central agency; instead, the design bureaus had been very powerful. To an extent, this continued during the first years of the agency, which suffered from a lack of authority while the design bureaus fought to survive in the difficult environment.

=== The crisis years ===
In 1993, the most prestigious program of the industry, the Buran space shuttle, was canceled. It had been worked on for 20 years by the industry's best companies, and the cancelation immediately resulted in a 30% reduction in the industry's work force. 300,000 people worked in the industry at the end of 1994, down from 400,000 in 1987, and the space program's funding now amounted to just 0.23% of the country's budget.

The final phase of the space program's contraction took place during the 1998 Russian financial crisis. Much of the budgeted money never arrived at the companies. The space industry continued to shed work force, and soon only 100,000 people remained. Wages were also cut: for example at the leading rocket engine producer NPO Energomash, the average monthly salary during this time was 3,000 rubles ($104). The space industry's physical infrastructure declined greatly, and this was symbolised by a roof collapse in 2001 at the Baikonur Cosmodrome which destroyed the Buran shuttle which had flown the one and only flight of the program in 1988. No funds were available to look after the shuttle's hangar in Baikonur and it collapsed on the shuttle in May 2002.

==== Foreign partnerships ====
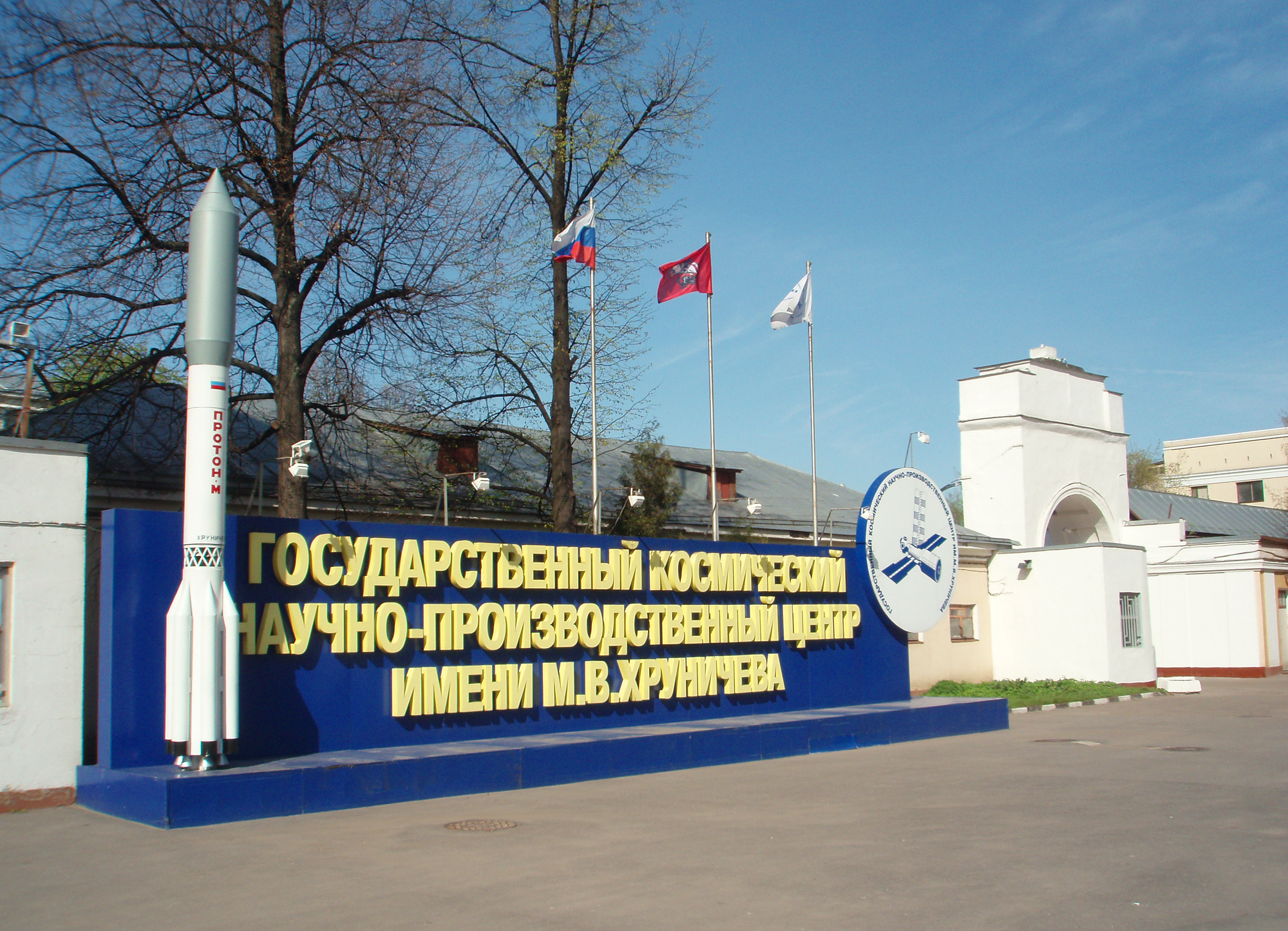
Entrance to Khrunichev State Research and Production Space Center in Moscow. Since 1994, Khrunichev's Proton-M rocket has earned Russia's space industry $4.3 billion.

During the crisis years, of the main ways for the industry's companies to survive was to look for foreign partnerships. In this respect, Khrunichev was particularly successful. On 15 April 1993 Khrunichev created the Lockheed-Khrunichev-Energia joint venture with the American company Lockheed. In 1995, due to the merger of Lockheed and Martin Marietta, it was transformed into International Launch Services (ILS). The joint venture marketed launches on both the Proton and the American Atlas rockets. The United States had given permission for the appearance of Proton on the international launch market, but introduced a quota to protect the launch market from "Russian dumping." Despite this, the Proton, built by Khrunichev, was successful and by the end of 2000 had earned launch contracts worth over $1.5 billion. Since 1994, the Proton has earned $4.3 billion for the Russian space industry as a whole, and in 2011 this figure is expected to raise to $6 billion.

Another successful company was NPO Energomash, whose extremely powerful RD-180 engine was installed on American Atlas V rockets. The rocket's manufacturer Lockheed Martin initially bought 101 RD-180 engines from Energomash, earning the company $1 billion in hard currency.

=== New federal space plan ===
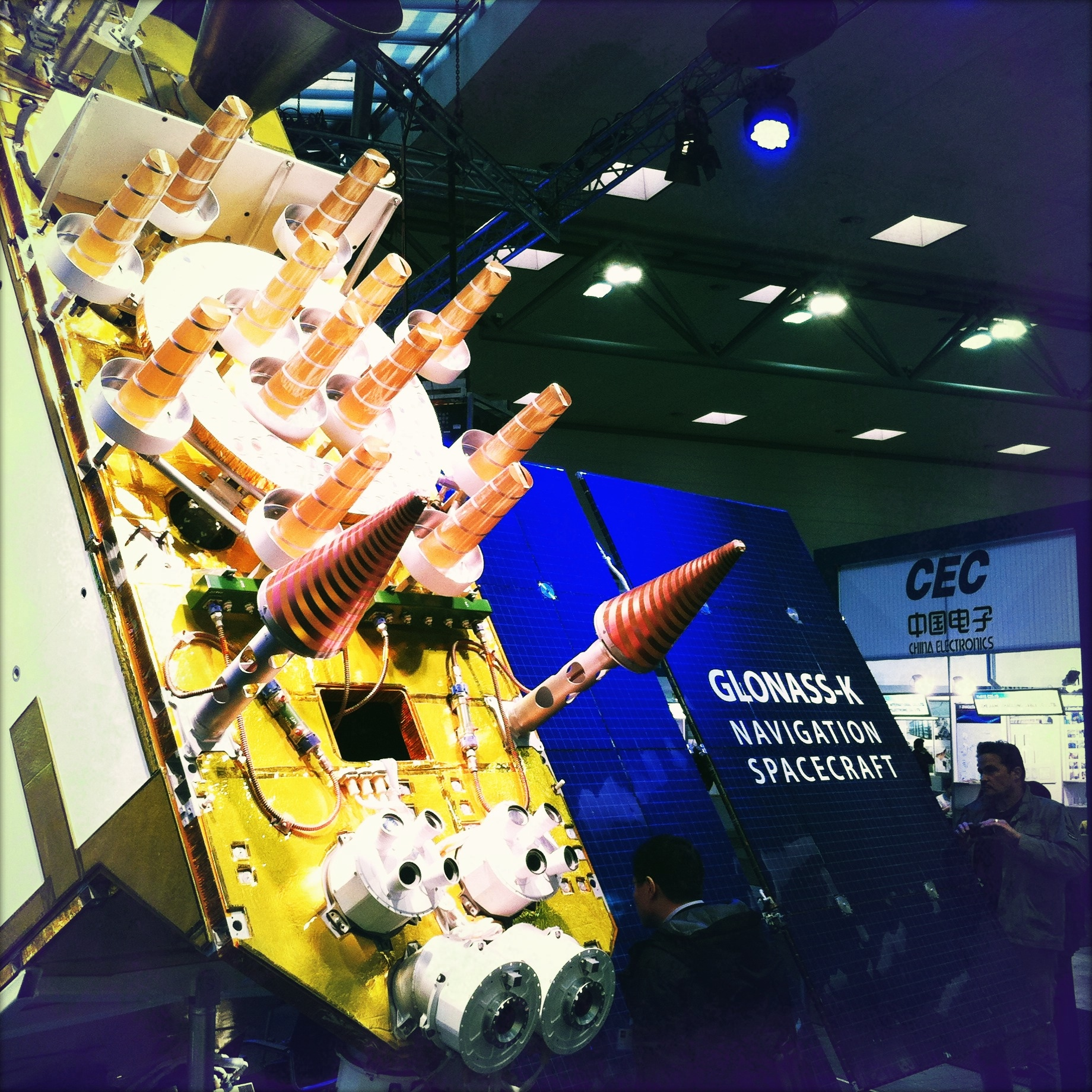
A GLONASS-K satellite, produced by Reshetnev Information Satellite Systems

In the early 2000s, during Vladimir Putin's presidency, the Russian economy started recovering, growing more each year than in all of the previous decade. The funding outlook for Russia's space program started to look more favourable.

In 2001, the development of the GLONASS satellite navigation system was made a government priority with the introduction of a new Federal Targeted Program. The main contractor for GLONASS, NPO PM (later renamed ISS Reshetnev), thus received a boost in its finances. In total, 4.8 billion rubles was allocated for the space program in 2001, of which 1.6 billion was earmarked for GLONASS. By 2004, Russia's space spending had grown to 12 billion rubles. In 2005, a new strategy for the development of the country's space program, titled the Federal Space Plan 2006–2015, was approved. It stipulated the completion of the International Space Station, development of the Angara rocket family, introduction of a new crewed spacecraft and completion of the GLONASS constellation, among others.

In the mid-2000s, funding of the space program continued to improve substantially, amounting to 21.59 billion rubles in 2005 and rising to 23 billion rubles in 2006. In 2007, 24.4 billion rubles was spent on the civilian space program, while the military space program's budget was 11 billion rubles. The industry also continued to receive very substantial funds from exports and foreign partnerships.

=== 2013 reorganization of the Russian space sector ===
As a result of a series of reliability problems, and proximate to the failure of a July 2013 Proton M launch, a major reorganization of the Russian space industry was undertaken. The United Rocket and Space Corporation was formed as a joint-stock corporation by the government in August 2013 to consolidate the Russian space sector. Deputy Prime Minister Dmitry Rogozin said "the failure-prone space sector is so troubled that it needs state supervision to overcome its problems." Three days following the Proton M launch failure, the Russian government had announced that "extremely harsh measures" would be taken "and spell the end of the [Russian] space industry as we know it."

== Structure of the industry ==
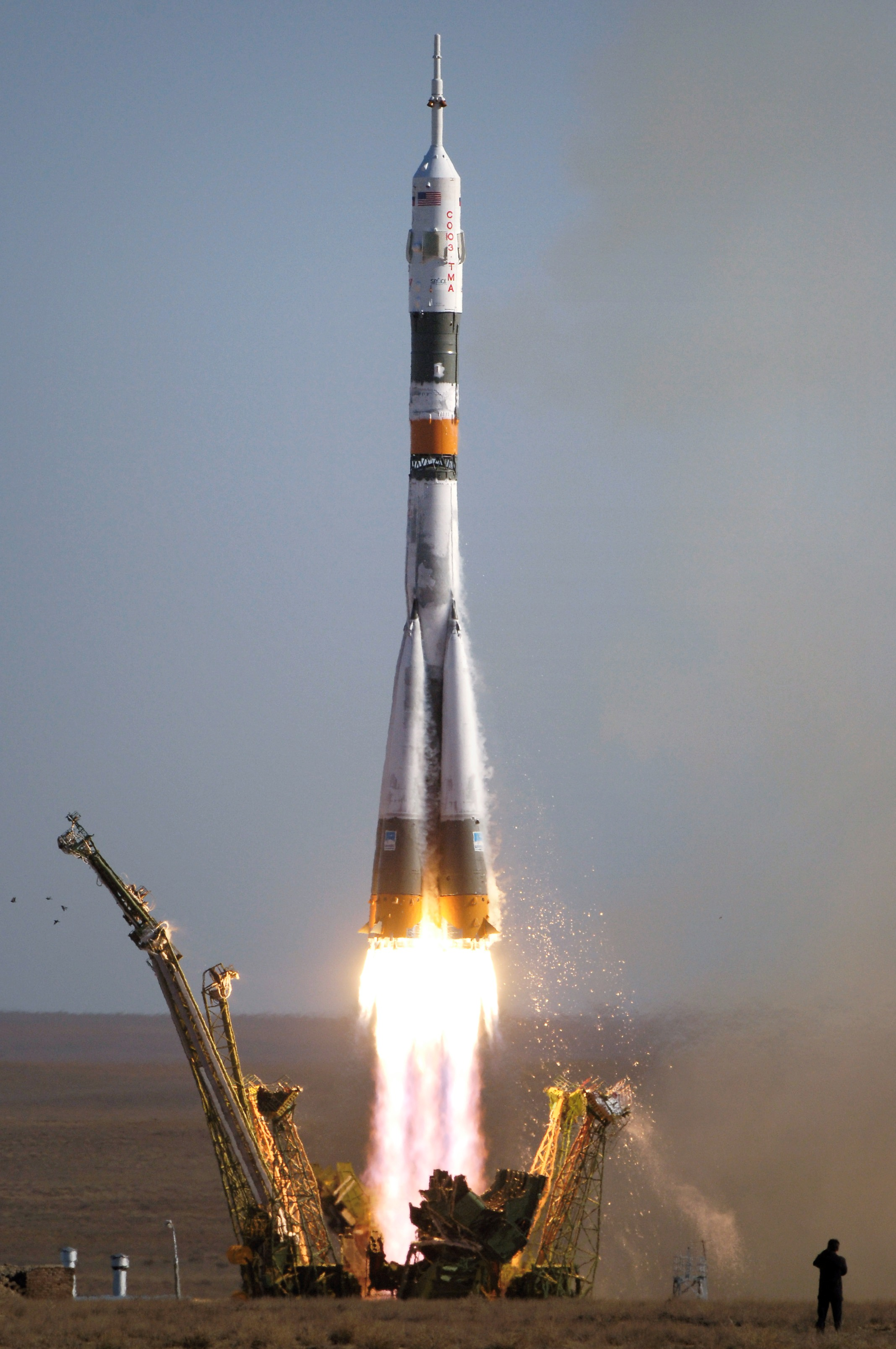
A Soyuz-FG rocket launching a Soyuz-TMA spacecraft. Soyuz-FG is produced by TsSKB Progress, while Soyuz-TMA is made by RKK Energia

The largest company of Russia's space industry is RKK Energiya. It is the country's main human spaceflight contractor, the lead developer of the Soyuz-TMA and Progress spacecraft and the Russian end of the International Space Station. It employs around 22,000-30,000 people. Progress State Research and Production Rocket Space Center (TsSKB Progress) is the developer and producer of the famous Soyuz launch vehicle. The Soyuz-FG version is used to launch crewed spacecraft, while the international joint-venture Starsem markets commercial satellite launches on the other versions. TsSKB Progress is currently leading the development of a new launcher called Rus-M, which is to replace the Soyuz. Moscow-based Khrunichev State Research and Production Space Center is one of the commercially most successful companies of the space industry. It is the developer of the Proton-M rocket and the Fregat upper stage. The company's new Angara rocket family is expected to be put into service 2013. The largest satellite manufacturer in Russia is ISS Reshetnev (formerly called NPO PM). It is main contractor for the GLONASS satellite navigation program and produces the Ekspress series of communications satellites. The company is located in Zheleznogorsk, Krasnoyarsk Krai, and employs around 6,500 people. The leading rocket engine company is NPO Energomash, designer and producer of the famous RD-180 engine. In electric spacecraft propulsion, OKB Fakel, located in Kaliningrad Oblast, is one of the top companies. NPO Lavochkin is Russia's main planetary probe designer. It is responsible for the high-profile Fobos-Grunt mission, Russia's first attempt at an interplanetary probe since Mars 96.

== List of main companies ==
=== Launcher manufacturers ===
- Progress Rocket Space Centre: Soyuz-2.1a/2.1b
- Khrunichev: Proton-M, Angara

=== Engines ===
A large experience gained by the Russian propulsion industry on all types of rocket engines but in particular in oxygen hydrocarbon propellant and staged combustion system.

- NPO Energomash
- Production Corporation Polyot
- KBKhA
- KBKhM
- JSC Kuznetsov
- Keldysh Research Center
- OKB Fakel
- NIIMash
- TsNIIMash
- Proton-PM
- Voronezh Mechanical Plant

=== Spacecraft ===
- Energiya: Soyuz MS (crewed), Progress MS (cargo)

=== Interplanetary missions ===
- NPO Lavochkin: Fobos-Grunt

=== Satellite developers ===
- ISS Reshetnev: GLONASS, Express
- NPO Lavochkin: Elektro–L
- Gazprom Space Systems
- SPUTNIX
- DAURIA Aerospace
- Success Rockets

== Environmental impact ==
Critics claim that Proton rocket fuel (unsymmetrical dimethylhydrazine, UDMH) and debris created by Russia's space programme is poisoning areas of Russia and Kazakhstan. Clusters of cancers have been found in the Republic of Altai and residents claim that acid rain falls after some launches. Anatoly Kuzin, deputy director of the Khrunichev State Research and Production Space Center, has denied these claims, saying: "We did special research into the issue. The level of acidity in the atmosphere is not affected by the rocket launches [and] there is no data to prove any link between the illnesses [in Altai] and the influence of rocket fuel components or space activity of any kind".

== See also ==
- Aviation industry of Russia
- Defence industry of Russia
- Success Rockets — Russian private space company

== Literature ==
- Harvey, Brian (2007). The Rebirth of the Russian Space Program (1st ed.). Germany: Springer. ISBN 978-0-387-71354-0.
