= Rus-M =

Canceled Russian proposal for a crewed launch vehicle

- Rus-M Design Concept
- Function: Human-rated orbital launch vehicle
- Manufacturer: TsSKB-Progress
- Country of origin: Russia

Size
- Height: 61.1 m (200 ft)
- Diameter: 3.5 m (11 ft) (Main Core)
- Mass: 233,000–1,440,000 kg (514,000–3,175,000 lb)
- Stages: 2 - 3

Capacity

Payload to LEO
- Mass: 6,500–50,000 kg (14,300–110,200 lb)

Launch history
- Status: Cancelled
- Launch sites: Vostochny Cosmodrome
- Total launches: 0

First stage
- Powered by: 3 RD-180
- Maximum thrust: 4.15 MN (930,000 lb_{f})
- Specific impulse: 338 s (3.31 km/s)
- Propellant: LOX/RP-1

Second stage
- Powered by: 4 RD-0146
- Maximum thrust: 98.1 kN (22,100 lb_{f})
- Specific impulse: 463 s (4.54 km/s)
- Propellant: LOX/LH2

Rus-M (Russian: Русь-М) was a proposed launcher design which was intended to become Russia's main launch vehicle for crewed spaceflight after 2018, and an integral part of the Orel spacecraft being developed to replace the Soyuz.

Rus-M was being developed by TsSKB-Progress, beginning in 2009. The program was halted in October 2011, restarted in 2012 and finally cancelled in August 2015.

== History ==
In 2009, Roscomos published the specifications for a Rus-M launch vehicle. Several variants of the Rus-M were later proposed, creating a family of similar launch vehicles. In spring of 2009, TsSKB-Progress won a government contract to develop a new launcher for Russia's human space program. The project was featured in MAKS 2009 Airshow, and preliminary design of the vehicle was expected to be submitted to the Russian space agency Roscosmos by August 2010.

== Requirements ==
Safety requirements put forward by Roscosmos emphasized that the launcher design is to be extremely reliable; safe abort options for crewed vehicles must be available at any stage of flight, and vehicle departure from the launch pad must be guaranteed for the case of an emergency during an early stage of the launch sequence. The launcher was planned to provide a basis for a future heavy launcher capable to carry a payload of 50—60 tons, as well as for a super-heavy design lifting 130—150 tons.

== Description ==
Four variants of Rus-M were planned for development. Each version would use a variable number of common cores as the first stage and boosters, each powered by a single Energomash RD-180 rocket engine burning kerosene and liquid oxygen. Two upper stages were planned. The first would have used four RD-0146 hydrolox engines developed by Chemical Automatics Design Bureau. The second option would have been a kerosene fueled stage common with Soyuz-2.

The first version of the rocket was to use three first stage cores, inseparably bolted together, with an RD-0146 powered second stage. It would have been able to lift a cargo or satellite payload of 23.8 tons to a 200-km, 51.7-degree circular orbit, a crew vehicle of 18.8 tons to a 135 by 400-km orbit, 7.0 tons to geostationary transfer orbit and 4.0 tons to geostationary orbit. The second variant would add two additional cores, and allow the strapon boosters to detach earlier in flight, boosting payload capacity to 35 tons. Version 3 would use stretched tanks on the booster cores, increasing payload again to 50 tons. Version 4 would fly with only a single core, and a Soyuz 2-derived upper stage.

== Development ==
TsSKB Progress was responsible for overall project leadership, system integration, second stage development and production. First stage development was to be led by Makeev KB Mash, while NPO Avtomatiki was to provide the rocket's flight control system. After Rus-M was ultimately canceled in 2011 after falling victim to the Great Recession, and competition with Angara, TsSKB Progress disclosed the existence of the Soyuz-5 rocket concept in 2013. Soyuz-5, later renamed "Irtysh", became the successor to Rus-M after Rus-M's cancelation and Irtysh surviving Roscosmos budget cuts in 2015.

== See also ==
- Irtysh – Russian rocket, in development
- Comparison of orbital launch systems
