= Luch Scientific Production Association (Podolsk) =

Russian company

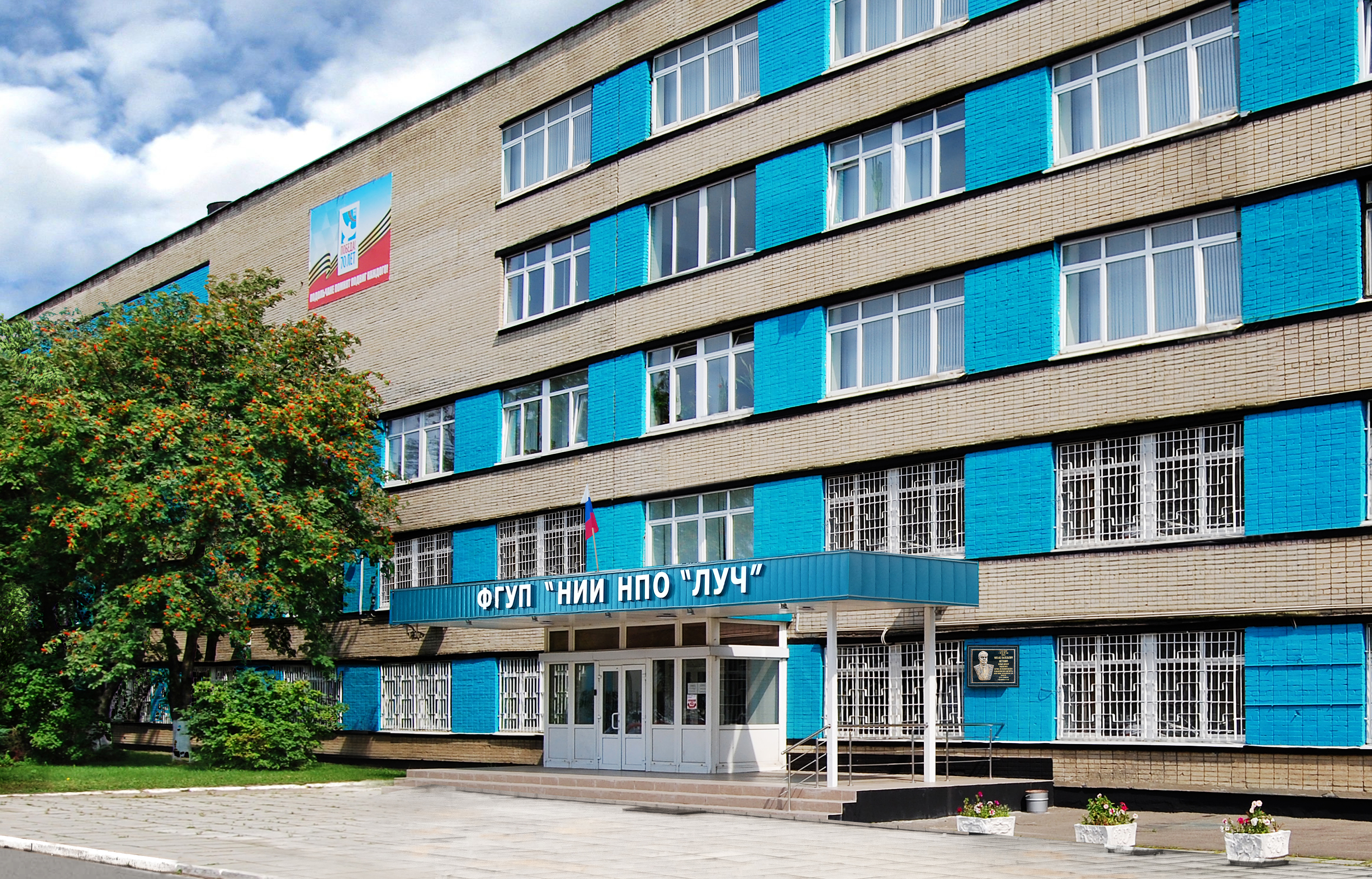
- Headquarters: Russia
- Website: sialuch.com

Luch Scientific Production Association (Russian: НИИ НПО «ЛУЧ») or NPO Luch is a company based in Podolsk, Russia. It is part of Rosatom.

NPO "Luch" was founded as a research and production enterprise for rare earth metals for the nuclear industry and became an NPO in the late 1980s. It produces metals, alloys, and compounds of tungsten, molybdenum, niobium, zirconium, tantalum, beryllium, chromium, rhenium, and titanium for the nuclear, chemical, and electronic industries.

It was one of the main developers of the Topaz-2 satellite nuclear power reactor and is developing thermionic fuel elements and other materials for the Topaz-3 nuclear power reactor. NPO "Luch" has also conducted extensive work on high-temperature cores for nuclear rocket propulsion, designed for space projects. The Associated Expedition of NPO "Luch", the enterprise's field test facility, is located at Semey in Kazakhstan.
