= Luch Scientific Production Association (Novosibirsk) =

- Founded: 1942
- Headquarters: Novosibirsk, Russia
- Products: artillery fuzes, tape recorders, children's toys etc.

Luch Scientific Production Association (Russian: Научно-производственное объединение «Луч») or NPO Luch is a manufacturing business in Novosibirsk, Russia. It was founded in 1942. Production: artillery fuses, tape recorders, children's toys, etc.

== History ==
The plant was established in 1942.

During World War II, it produced high-explosive shells (20 and 23 mm) and a large number of delay and instantaneous fuses for artillery and aircraft shells.

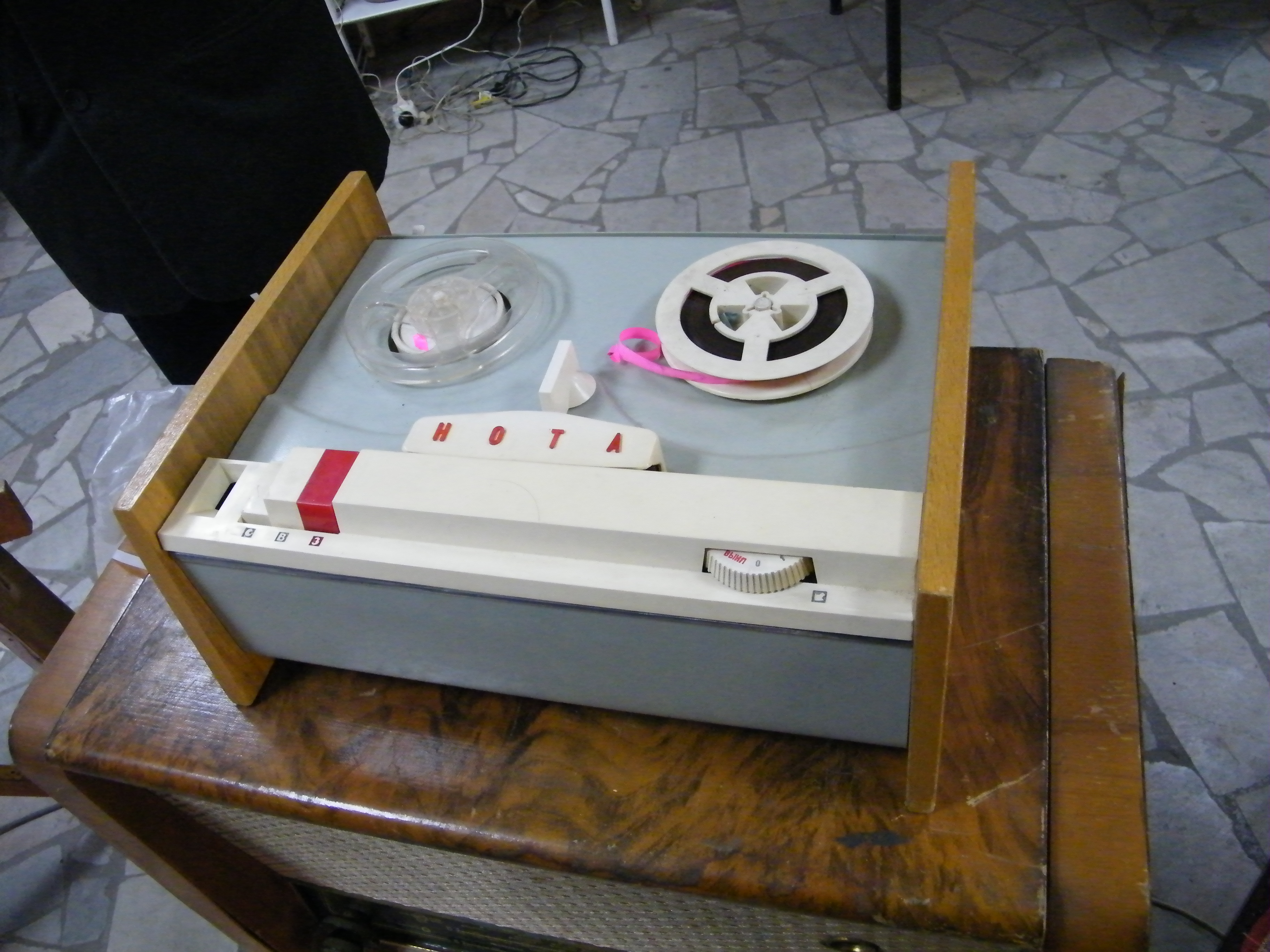
Nota tape recorder (1966)

In 1956, the plant began production of sound recording and reproduction devices for radiograms, later it began to produce tape recorders.

According to data from 2002, NPO produced radio fuses for anti-aircraft and field artillery shells.

== Production ==
Artillery fuzes, Nota tape recorders, Luch photocatalytic air cleaners, meteorological equipment, children's toys (the board game Hockey etc.).

== Finance ==
In 2013, the plant's revenue amounted to 138.5 million rubles, the net loss was 113.2 million rubles, the overdue debt of the enterprise as of December 31, 2013 amounted to 149.3 million rubles.

== Bibliography ==
- Ламин В. А. (2003). Энциклопедия. Новосибирск. Новосибирск: Новосибирское книжное издательство. p. 499. ISBN 5-7620-0968-8.
