= Roscosmos =

Space agency of Russia

State Corporation for Space Activities "Roscosmos"
- Государственная корпорация по космической деятельности «Роскосмос»

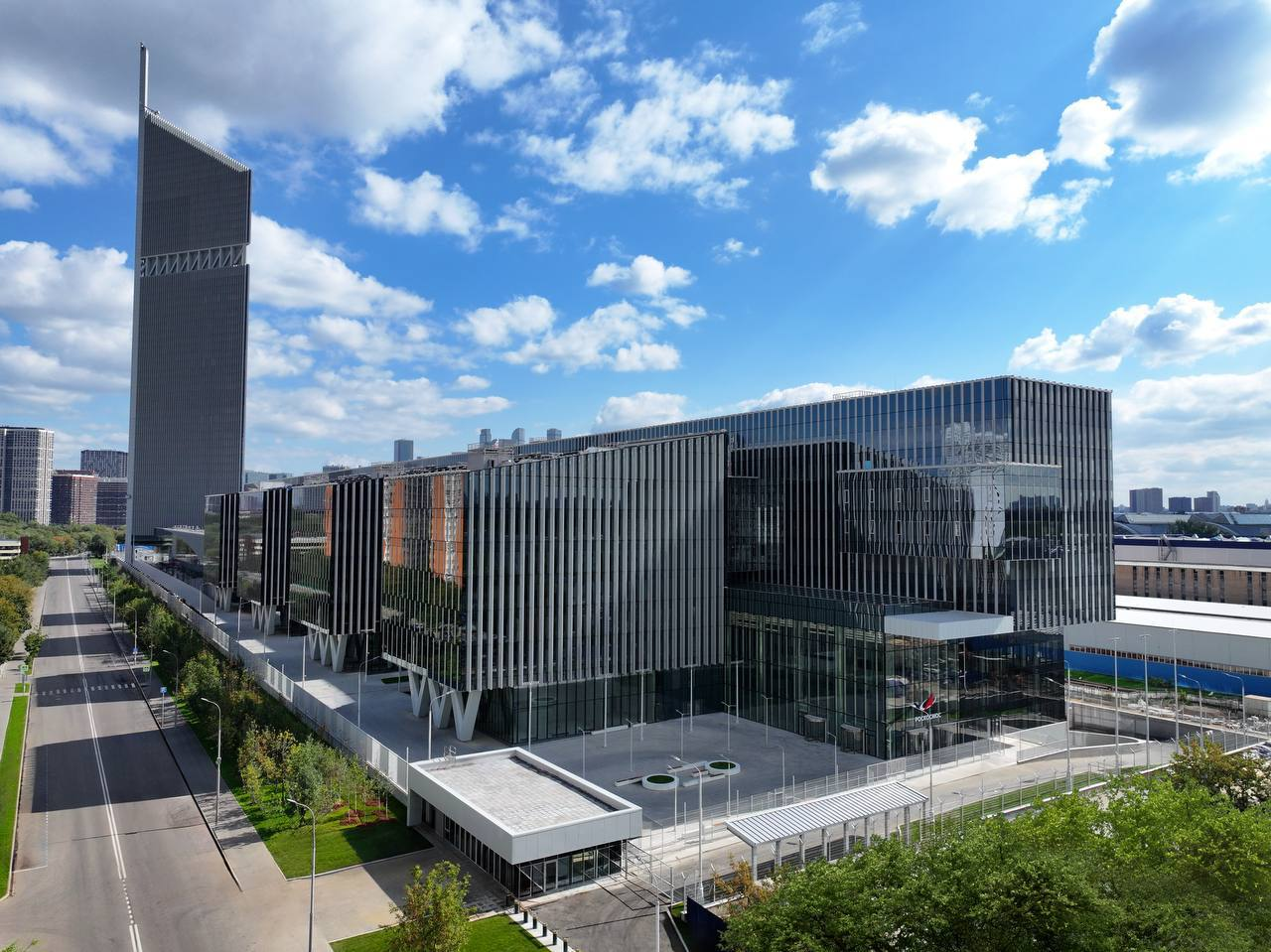
- V.V. Tereshkova National Space Centre headquarters building in Moscow

Agency overview
- Abbreviation: Roscosmos
- Formed: 25 February 1992 (as the Russian Space Agency)
- Preceding agency: Soviet space program (1955–1991, in the form of the Ministry of General Machine-Building)
- Type: Space agency
- Jurisdiction: Federal Government of Russia
- Headquarters: Moscow, Russia; 55°45′44″N 37°29′31″E
- Official language: Russian
- General Director: Dmitry Bakanov
- Primary spaceports: Baikonur Cosmodrome; Plesetsk Cosmodrome; Vostochny Cosmodrome
- Owner: Russia
- Employees: 170,500 (2020)
- Annual budget: ₽413 billion (US$4.85 billion) (2023)
- Website: www.roscosmos.ru (archived)

The State Corporation for Space Activities "Roscosmos", (Note: Russian: Государственная корпорация по космической деятельности «Роскосмос», romanized: Gosudarstvennaya korporatsiya po kosmicheskoy deyatel'nosti "Roskosmos") is a state corporation of the Russian Federation responsible for space flights, cosmonautics programs, and aerospace research.

Roscosmos inherited the bulk of the vast Soviet space program following the dissolution of the Soviet Union in 1991. Established in 1992 as the Russian Space Agency, its modern form resulted from a 2015 merge with the United Rocket and Space Corporation, re-nationalizing the space industry of Russia. Roscosmos is headquartered at the National Space Centre in Moscow; Mission Control Center and Star City are located in Moscow Oblast. Its cosmodromes, jointly operated with the Russian Space Forces, comprise Baikonur in Kazakhstan, the world's first and largest spaceport, Plesetsk in Arkhangelsk, and Vostochny in Amur. Its director since February 2025 is Dmitry Bakanov.

Roscosmos utilizes four rockets: the heavy-lift Proton-M and Angara A5, medium-lift Soyuz-2 variants, and small-lift Angara-1.2. Roscosmos constructed seven modules of the Russian Orbital Segment on the International Space Station (ISS), founding the station with Zarya in 1998. It inherited the Soyuz program, the most flown crewed spacecraft in history. Its derivations, most recently Soyuz MS and Progress MS, service the ISS. Roscosmos extended operations aboard Mir, the first modular space station, ten years beyond its design life; its last crewed mission departed in 2000. The Russian Orbital Station is planned to be constructed from the ISS's Nauka module alongside the ISS deorbit from 2028. Roscosmos is developing the medium-lift Soyuz-5 and partially reusable methalox Soyuz-7.

The Luna-Glob program aims to succeed Soviet missions to the Moon. The Luna 25 lander failed in 2023, future plans include an orbiter, polar landers, and a sample return. Mars missions Mars 96 and Fobos-Grunt failed, while its joint mission with the European Space Agency (ESA), Trace Gas Orbiter, entered orbit in 2016; its Venera-17 orbiter/lander Venus mission launch was postponed beyond 2034. Roscosmos plans crewed Moon missions, developing the Orel spacecraft, Yenisei super heavy-lift rocket, and planning the International Lunar Research Station, with the Chinese space program and 11 other countries.

Reactions to the 2022 Russian invasion of Ukraine isolated the agency internationally: Roscosmos ended the Soyuz at the Guiana Space Centre program with ESA, and its supply of NK-33 and RD-181 engines to the US Orbital Sciences Antares rockets; ESA suspended cooperation on the ExoMars program.

== Name ==
Roscosmos began as the Russian Space Agency, established 1992 and restructured in 1999 and 2004 as the Russian Aviation and Space Agency and the Federal Space Agency (Roscosmos), respectively. In 2015, the Federal Space Agency (Roscosmos) was merged with the United Rocket and Space Corporation, a government corporation, to re-nationalize the space industry of Russia, leading to Roscosmos in its current form.

== History ==
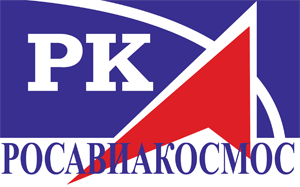
Patch of the Russian Space Agency, 1991–2004

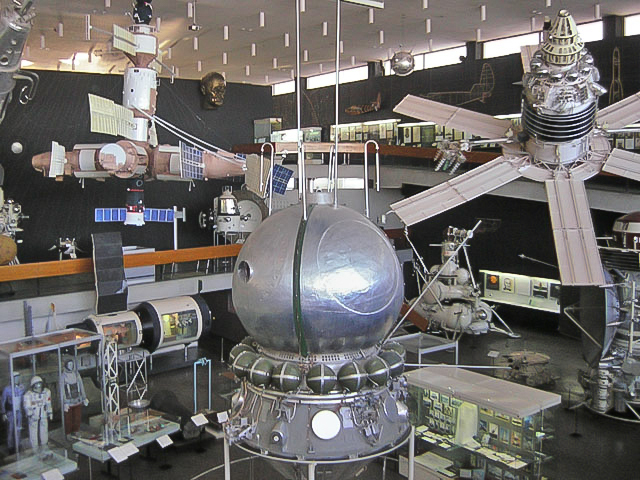
The Hall of Space Technology in the Tsiolkovsky State Museum of the History of Cosmonautics, Kaluga, Russia. The exhibition includes the models and replicas of the following Russian/Soviet inventions: the first satellite, Sputnik 1 (a ball under the ceiling); the first spacesuits (lower-left corner); the first human spaceflight module, the Vostok 3KA (center); the first Molniya-type satellite (upper right corner); the first space rover, Lunokhod 1 (lower right); the first space station, Salyut 1 (left); the first modular space station, Mir (upper left).

The Soviet space program did not have central executive agencies. Instead, its organizational architecture was multi-centered; it was the design bureaus and the council of designers that had the most say, not the political leadership. The creation of a central agency by the Russian Federation after the dissolution of the Soviet Union was therefore a new development. The Russian Space Agency was formed on 25 February 1992, by a decree of President Yeltsin. Yuri Koptev, who had previously worked with designing Mars landers at NPO Lavochkin, became the agency's first director.

In the early years, the agency suffered from lack of authority as the powerful design bureaus fought to protect their own spheres of operation and to survive. For example, the decision to keep Mir in operation beyond 1999 was not made by the agency, but by the private shareholder board of the Energia design bureau. Another example is that the decision to develop the new Angara rocket was rather a function of Khrunichev's ability to attract resources than a conscious long-term decision by the agency.

=== Crisis years ===
The 1990s saw serious financial problems due to the decreased cash flow, which encouraged the space agency to improvise and seek other ways to keep space programs running. This resulted in the agency's leading role in commercial satellite launches and space tourism. Scientific missions, such as interplanetary probes or astronomy missions during these years played a very small role, and although the agency had connections with the Russian aerospace forces, its budget was not part of Russia's defense budget; nevertheless, the agency managed to operate the Mir space station well past its planned lifespan, contributed to the International Space Station, and continued to fly Soyuz and Progress missions.

In 1994, Roscosmos renewed the lease on its Baikonur cosmodrome with the government of Kazakhstan.

=== 2000: Start of ISS cooperation ===
On 31 October 2000, a Soyuz spacecraft lifted off from the Baikonur Cosmodrome at 10:53 a.m. Kazakhstan time. On board were Expedition One Commander William M. (Bill) Shepherd of NASA and cosmonauts Sergei Krikalev and Yuri Gidzenko of Roscosmos. The trio arrived at the International Space Station on 2 November, marking the start of an uninterrupted human presence on the orbiting laboratory.

=== 2004–2006: Improved situation ===
In March 2004, the agency's director Yuri Koptev was replaced by Anatoly Perminov, who had previously served as the first commander of the Space Forces.

The Russian economy boomed throughout 2005 from high prices for exports, such as oil and gas, the outlook for future funding in 2006 appeared more favorable. This resulted in the Russian Duma approving a budget of 305 billion rubles (about US$11 billion) for the Space Agency from January 2006 until 2015, with overall space expenditures in Russia total about 425 billion rubles for the same time period. The budget for 2006 was as high as 25 billion rubles (about US$900 million), which is a 33% increase from the 2005 budget. Under the current 10-year budget approved, the budget of the Space Agency shall increase 5–10% per year, providing the space agency with a constant influx of money. In addition to the budget, Roscosmos plans to have over 130 billion rubles flowing into its budget by other means, such as industry investments and commercial space launches. It is around the time US-based The Planetary Society entered a partnership with Roscosmos.

- New science missions: Koronas Foton (launched in January 2009, lost in April 2010), Spektr R (RadioAstron, launched in July 2011, retired in May 2019), Intergelizond (2011?), Spektr RG (Roentgen Gamma, launched 2019, one of two telescopes operational), Spektr UV (Ultra Violet, planned 2030), Spektr M (planned 2030), Celsta (2018?) and Terion (2018?)
- Resumption of Bion missions with Bion-M (2013)
- New weather satellites Elektro L (launched in January 2011) and Elektro P (2015)

=== 2006–2012 ===
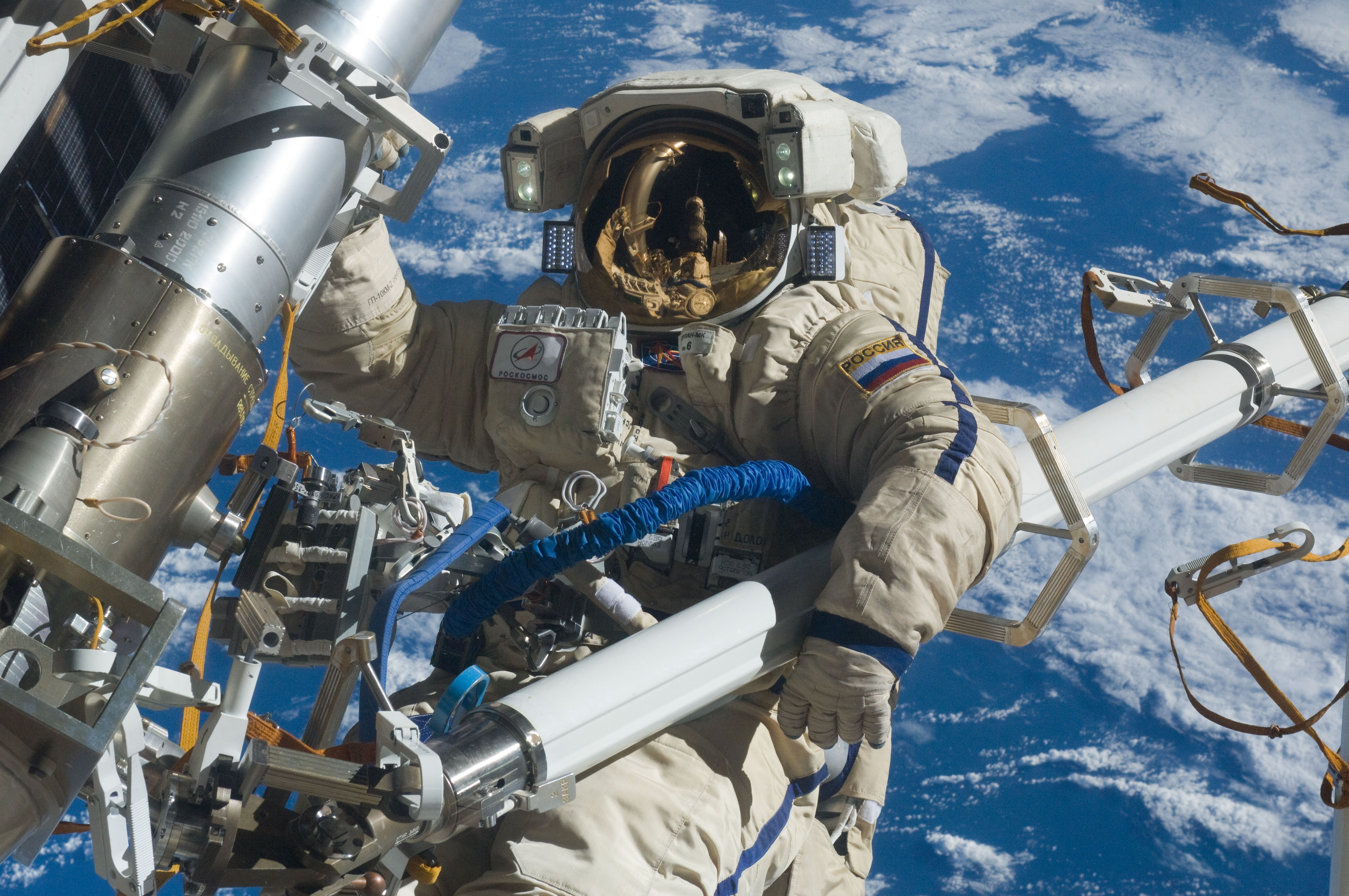
Cosmonaut Anton Shkaplerov on EVA (February 2012)

The federal space budget for the year 2009 was left unchanged despite the global economic crisis, standing at about 82 billion rubles ($2.4 billion). In 2011, the government spent 115 billion rubles ($3.8 bln) in the national space programs.

The proposed project core budget for 2013 to be around 128.3 billion rubles. The budget for the whole space program is 169.8 billion rubles. ($5.6 bln). By 2015, the amount of the budget can be increased to 199.2 billion rubles.

Priorities of the Russian space program include the new Angara rocket family and development of new communications, navigation and remote Earth sensing spacecraft. The GLONASS global navigation satellite system has for many years been one of the top priorities and has been given its own budget line in the federal space budget. In 2007, GLONASS received 9.9 billion rubles ($360 million), and under the terms of a directive signed by Prime Minister Vladimir Putin in 2008, an additional $2.6 billion will be allocated for its development.

Space station funding issues

Due to International Space Station involvements, up to 50% of Russia's space budget is spent on the crewed space program as of 2009. Some observers have pointed out that this has a detrimental effect on other aspects of space exploration, and that the other space powers spend much lesser proportions of their overall budgets on maintaining human presence in orbit.

Despite the considerably improved budget, attention of legislative and executive authorities, positive media coverage and broad support among the population, the Russian space program continues to face several problems. Wages in the space industry are low; the average age of employees is high (46 years in 2007), and much of the equipment is obsolete. On the positive side, many companies in the sector have been able to profit from contracts and partnerships with foreign companies; several new systems such as new rocket upper stages have been developed in recent years; investments have been made to production lines, and companies have started to pay more attention to educating a new generation of engineers and technicians.

2011 New director

On 29 April 2011, Perminov was replaced with Vladimir Popovkin as the director of Roscosmos. The 65-year-old Perminov was over the legal age for state officials, and had received some criticism after a failed GLONASS launch in December 2010. Popovkin is a former commander of the Russian Space Forces and First Deputy Defense Minister of Russia. Also in 2011, the Fobos-Grunt Mars mission was lost in low Earth orbit and crashed back to earth in 2012.

=== 2013–2016: Reorganization of the Russian space sector ===
As a result of a series of reliability problems, and proximate to the failure of a July 2013 Proton M launch, a major reorganization of the Russian space industry was undertaken. The United Rocket and Space Corporation was formed as a joint-stock corporation by the government in August 2013 to consolidate the Russian space sector. Deputy Prime Minister Dmitry Rogozin said "the failure-prone space sector is so troubled that it needs state supervision to overcome its problems." Three days following the Proton M launch failure, the Russian government had announced that "extremely harsh measures" would be taken "and spell the end of the [Russian] space industry as we know it." Information indicated then that the government intended to reorganize in such a way as to "preserve and enhance the Roscosmos space agency."

More detailed plans released in October 2013 called for a re-nationalization of the "troubled space industry", with sweeping reforms including a new "unified command structure and reducing redundant capabilities, acts that could lead to tens of thousands of layoffs." According to Rogozin, the Russian space sector employs about 250,000 people, while the United States needs only 70,000 to achieve similar results. He said: "Russian space productivity is eight times lower than America's, with companies duplicating one another's work and operating at about 40 percent efficiency."

Under the 2013 plan, Roscosmos was to "act as a federal executive body and contracting authority for programs to be implemented by the industry."

Despite Russian state efforts in the reorganization, two more Proton launch vehicle failures occurred in 2014 and 2015.

The government reorganized all of Russia's rocket engine companies into a single entity in June 2015. NPO Energomash, as well as all other engine companies, became a part of United Rocket and Space Corporation.

The decree to actually abolish Roscosmos as a state agency was signed by Vladimir Putin in December 2015, which was replaced by a state-run corporation effective 1 January 2016.

In 2016, the state agency was dissolved and the Roscosmos brand moved to the state corporation, which had been created in 2013 as the United Rocket and Space Corporation, with the specific mission to renationalize the Russian space sector.

In May 2018, Putin selected Rogozin to be the head of the Russian state space corporation Roscosmos.

=== 2017–2021 ===
In 2018, Russian President Vladimir Putin said "it 'is necessary to drastically improve the quality and reliability of space and launch vehicles' ... to preserve Russia's increasingly threatened leadership in space." In November 2018 Alexei Kudrin, head of Russian financial audit agency, named Roscosmos as the public enterprise with "the highest losses" due to "irrational spending" and outright theft and corruption, under the leadership of Igor Komarov who was terminated in May 2018 in favour of Rogozin.

In 2020 Roscosmos under Rogozin reneged on its participation in Lunar Gateway, a NASA-led project that will see a lunar orbiter spaceport for the moon. It had previously signed an agreement in September 2017 with the Americans.

In March 2021, Roscosmos signed a memorandum of cooperative construction of a lunar base called the International Lunar Research Station with the China National Space Administration."

In April 2021, Roscosmos announced that it will be departing the ISS program after 2024. In its place, it was announced that a new space station (Russian Orbital Service Station) will be constructed starting in 2025.

In June 2021 Rogozin complained that sanctions imposed in the wake of the 2014 Russian annexation of Crimea were hurting Roscosmos.

In September 2021, Roscosmos announced its revenue and net income, losing 25 billion roubles and 1 billion roubles respectively in 2020, due to the reduction of profit from foreign contracts, an increase in show-up pay, stay-at-home days and personnel health expenses due to the COVID-19 pandemic. According to Roscosmos, these losses would also impact the corporation for the next two years. In October, Roscosmos placed the tests of rocket engines in the engineering bureau of chemical automatics in Voronezh on hold for one month to deliver 33 tons of oxygen to local medical centers, as part of aid for the COVID-19 pandemic.

In December 2021, the Government of Russia confirmed determination of the agreement with Roscosmos for development of next-gen space systems, the document been provided for the officials in July 2020.

=== 2022–present ===
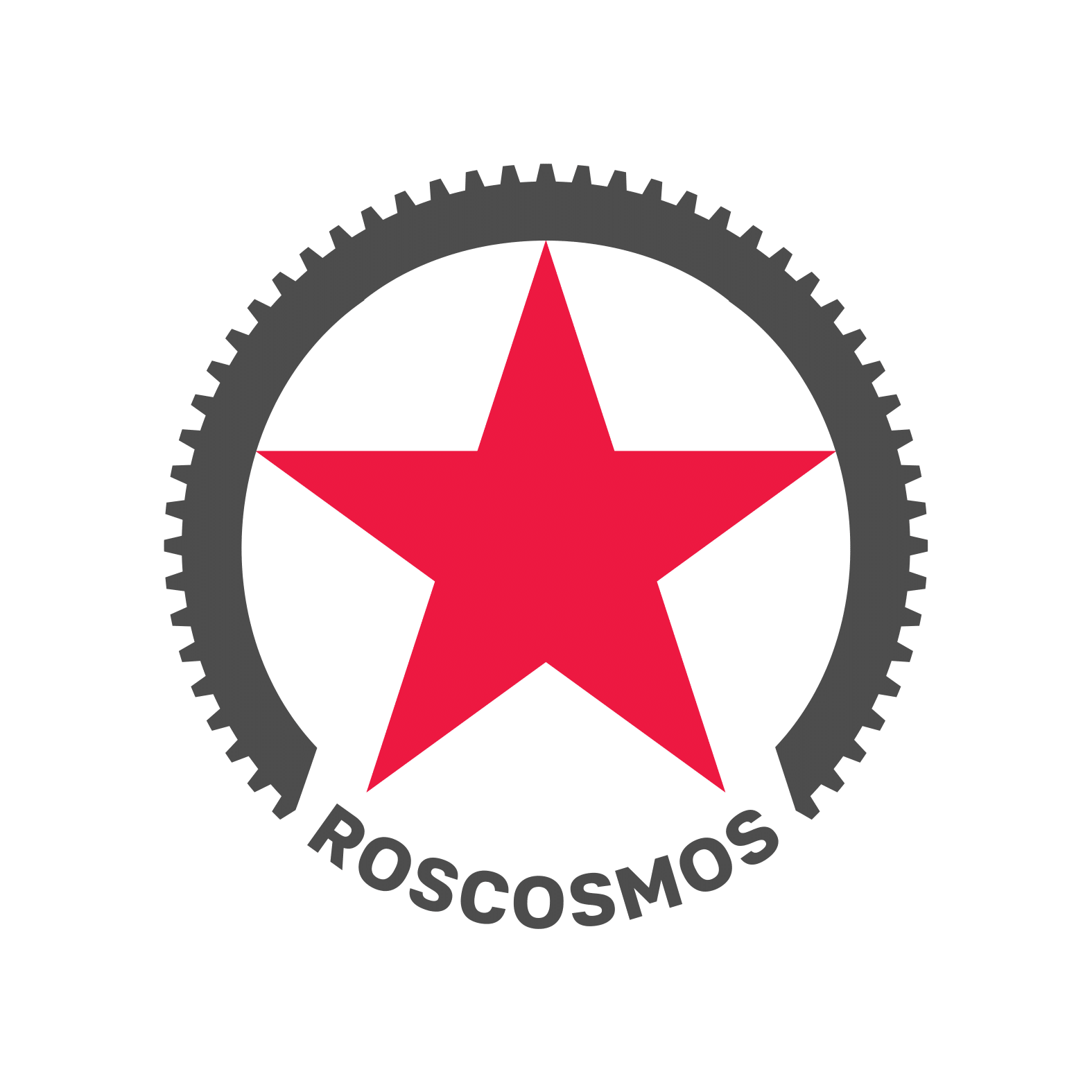
2022 alternate logo of Roscosmos

Since the Russian invasion of Ukraine on 24 February 2022, Roscosmos launched nine rockets in 2022 and seven in the first half of 2023.

In early March 2022, Roscosmos under Rogozin suspended its participation in the ESA's spaceport in Kourou, French Guiana in a tit-for-tat move over the sanctions imposed in the wake of the Russian invasion. As well Rogozin said he would suspend delivery of the RD-181 engine which is used for the Northrop Grumman Antares-Cygnus space cargo delivery system.

In late March 2022, the European Space Agency (ESA) suspended cooperation with Roscosmos in the ExoMars rover (now named Rosalind Franklin) mission because of the Russian invasion, and British satellite venture OneWeb signed contracts with ISRO and SpaceX to launch its satellites after friction had developed "with Moscow" and Roscosmos, its previous orbit service provider. The friction had developed over Rogozin's command that OneWeb needed to ditch its venture capital investment from the UK government.

On 2 May 2022, Rogozin announced that Roscosmos would terminate its involvement in the ISS with 12 months' notice as stipulated in the international contract that governs the satellite. This followed the 3 March 2022 announcement that Roscosmos would cease cooperation on scientific experiments at the Spacelab, and the 25 March 2022 announcement by Rogozin that "cooperation with Europe is now impossible after sanctions over the Ukraine war."

Rogozin was removed from his job as CEO in July 2022, and replaced with Yury Borisov, who seemed to stabilize the relationship with the ISS partners, especially NASA. One complaint against Rogozin was his risky words about terminating the ISS agreement over the war in Ukraine, which he broadcast as early as April 2022. At one point in time NASA had bought 71 return trips on Soyuz for almost $4 billion over six years.

The global space-launch services market was valued at $12.4 billion in 2021 and was forecast to reach $38 billion by decade's end. An American academic wrote that in the wake of the Russian invasion, Roscosmos' share of that market was likely to decline in favour of new entrants such as Japan and India, as well as commercial entrants like SpaceX and Blue Origin.

In June 2023, Roscosmos held a campaign to recruit volunteers for the Uran Battalion, a militia for the Russian invasion of Ukraine.

In October 2023, Borisov announced the need for 150 billion rubles to build the Russian space station in the next three years. At completion in 2032, it will have absorbed 609 billion rubles.

In February 2024, at the 2023 AGM, Borisov announced the loss of 180 billion rubles in export revenues, chiefly engine sales and launch services, because of the Western hostility to the Russian invasion of Ukraine. Roscosmos had lost 90% of its launch service contracts since the advent of the war.

In late 2025, Roscosmos launched three Iranian satellites into orbit aboard a Soyuz-2.1b rocket from Vostochny Cosmodrome. Analysts described the mission as part of Russia's ongoing cooperation with non-Western partners.

Roscosmos and Russia's space industry are facing significant challenges. The country is on track to conduct its fewest orbital launches since 1961. As of August 15, 2024, only nine launches had occurred, a sharp decline partly attributed to the loss of Western customers following Russia's invasion of Ukraine. Roscosmos has reported financial losses of 180 billion rubles ($2.1 billion) due to canceled contracts. The agency's first deputy director indicated it may not achieve profitability until 2025.

From 2025 on Roscosmos headquarters are located in the new National Space Center in the Moscow district of Fili.

== Current programs ==
=== Rockets ===
Roscosmos uses a family of several launch rockets, the most famous of them being the R-7, commonly known as the Soyuz rocket that is capable of launching about 7.5 tons into low Earth orbit (LEO). The Proton rocket (or UR-500K) has a lift capacity of over 20 tons to LEO. Smaller rockets include Rokot and other Stations.

Currently rocket development encompasses both a new rocket system, Angara, as well as enhancements of the Soyuz rocket, Soyuz-2 and Soyuz-2-3. Two modifications of the Soyuz, the Soyuz-2.1a and Soyuz-2.1b have already been successfully tested, enhancing the launch capacity to 8.5 tons to LEO. Future projects include the Soyuz successor launch rocket.

==== Operational ====
Vehicle	Manufacturer	Payload mass (kg)			Maiden flight	Total launches	Notes
Vehicle	Manufacturer	LEO	GTO	Other	Maiden flight	Total launches	Notes
Proton-M	Khrunichev	23,000	6,920	3,250 to GSO	7 April 2001	115	To be replaced by Angara A5
Soyuz‑2.1a	RTKs Progress	7,020			8 November 2004	73	Capable of human spaceflight
Soyuz‑2.1b	RTKs Progress	8,200	2,400		27 December 2006	76	
Angara 1.2	Khrunichev	3,500		2,400 to SSO	9 July 2014	4	
Angara A5	Khrunichev	24,000	7,500 with KVTK; 5,400 with Briz-M		23 December 2014	4	

==== Under development ====
Vehicle	Manufacturer	Payload mass (kg)			Planned maiden flight	Notes
Vehicle	Manufacturer	LEO	GTO	Other	Planned maiden flight	Notes
Irtysh (Soyuz‑5)	RTKs Progress	18,000 crewed 15,500 uncrewed	5,000		2025	Base of the Yenisei
Amur (Soyuz‑7)	KBKhA	10,500 reusable 12,500 expendable			2026	First reusable methalox Russian rocket
Yenisei	Energia/RTKs Progress	103,000	26,000	27,000 to TLI	2028	First super-heavy launch vehicle being developed by the Russian space industry since the fall of the USSR
Don	Energia/RTKs Progress	140,000	29,500	33,000 to TLI	2032–2035	Based on the Yenisei, with an additional stage

=== Scientific programs ===
Roscosmos operates a number of programs for Earth science, communication, and scientific research like the Bion-M space medicine satellite series, the Elektro–L meteorological satellite series and the Meteor-M meteorological satellite series. Roscosmos also operates one science satellite (Spektr-RG) and no interplanetary probes. As of 2024 there are plans for scientific robotic missions to one of the Mars moons as well as an increase in Lunar orbit research satellites to one (Luna-Glob). Future plans include:

- Luna-Glob Moon orbiters and landers, with plans for seven missions from 2023 until the 2030s. Luna 25 launched in 2023 crashed onto the moon.
- Venera-D Venus lander, planned for 2029

The agency has expanded its collaborative efforts with foreign partners, including the launch of services for Iranian satellites in 2025.

=== Space systems ===
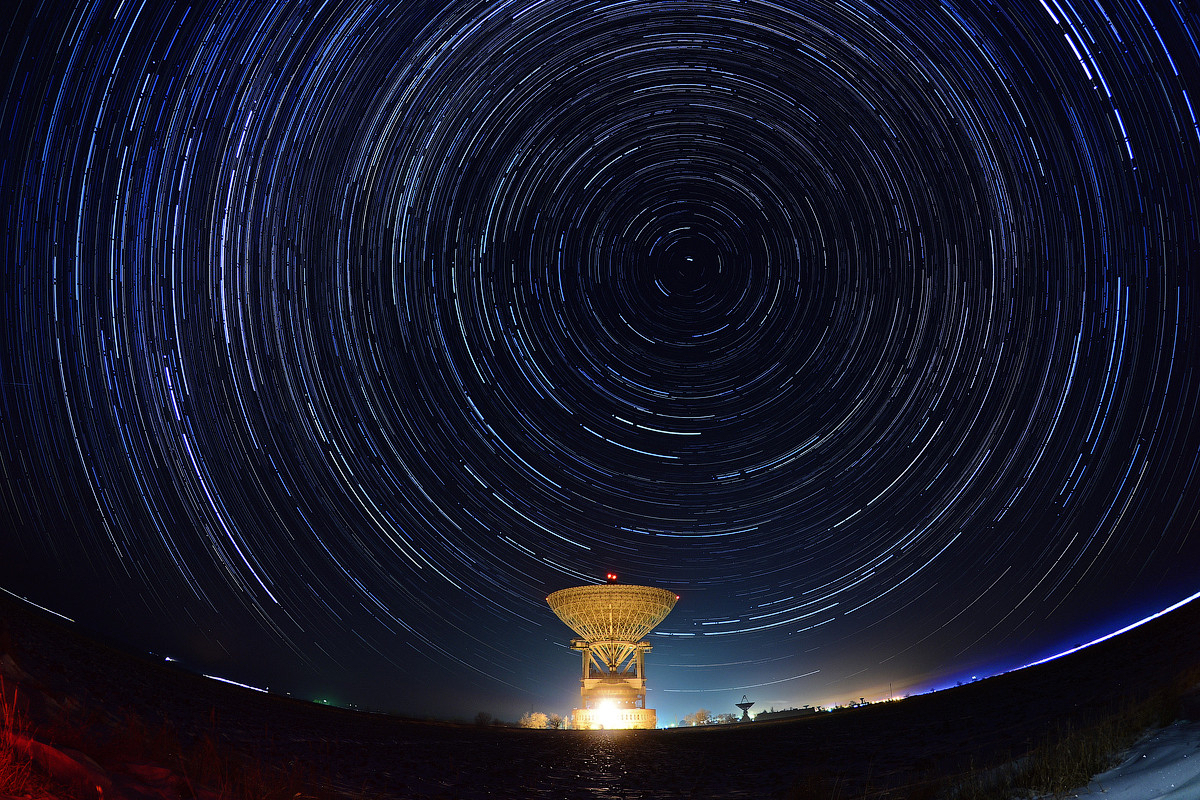
The Galenki RT-70 radio telescope. It is among the largest single dish radio telescopes in the world.

Resurs-P is a series of Russian commercial Earth observation satellites capable of acquiring high-resolution imagery (resolution up to 1.0 m). The spacecraft is operated by Roscosmos as a replacement of the Resurs-DK No.1 satellite.

Gonets is a series of civilian low Earth orbit communication satellite system. On 2016, the system consists of 13 satellites (12 Gonets-M and 1 Gonets-D1).

Create HEO space system "Arctic" to address the hydrological and meteorological problems in the Arctic region and the northern areas of the Earth, with the help of two spacecraft "Arktika-M" and in the future within the system can create a communications satellite "Arktika-MS" and radar satellites "Arktika-R."

The launch of two satellites "Obzor-R" (Review-R) Remote Sensing of the Earth, with the AESA radar and four spacecraft "Obzor-O" (Review-O) to capture the Earth's surface in normal and infrared light in a broad swath of 80 km with a resolution of 10 meters. The first two satellites of the projects planned for launch in 2015.

=== Gecko mating experiment ===
On 19 July 2014, Roscosmos launched the Foton-M4 satellite containing, among other animals and plants, a group of five geckos. The five geckos, four females and one male, were used as a part of the Gecko-F4 research program aimed at measuring the effects of weightlessness on the lizards' ability to procreate and develop in the harsh environment. However, soon after the spacecraft exited the atmosphere, mission control lost contact with the vessel which led to an attempt to reestablish communication that was only achieved later in the mission. When the satellite returned to Earth after its planned two-month mission had been cut short to 44 days, the space agency researchers reported that all the geckos had perished during the flight.

The exact cause that led to the deaths of the geckos was declared unknown by the scientific team in charge of the project. Reports from the Institute of Medical and Biological Problems in Russia have indicated that the lizards had been dead for at least a week prior to their return to Earth. A number of those connected to the mission have theorized that a failure in the vessel's heating system may have caused the cold blooded reptiles to freeze to death.

Included in the mission were a number of fruit flies, plants, and mushrooms which all survived the mission.

=== ISS involvement ===
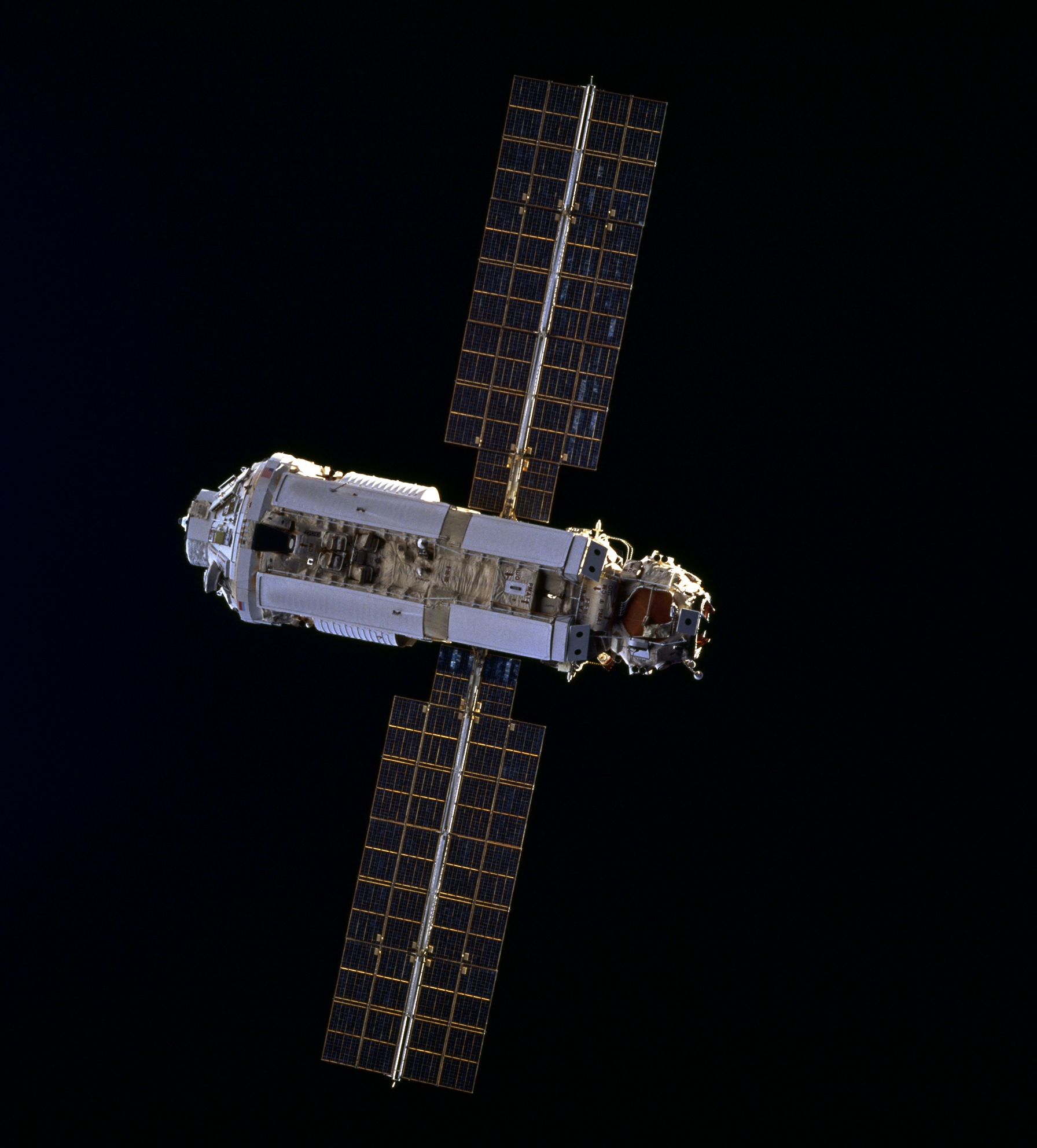
The Zarya module was the first module of the ISS, launched in 1998.

Roscosmos is one of the partners in the International Space Station program. It contributed the core space modules Zarya and Zvezda, which were both launched by Proton rockets and later were joined by NASA's Unity Module. The Rassvet module was launched aboard Space Shuttle Atlantis and is primarily used for cargo storage and as a docking port for visiting spacecraft. The Nauka module is the final planned component of the ISS, launch was postponed several times from the initially planned date in 2007, but attached to ISS in July 2021.

Roscosmos is responsible for expedition crew launches by Soyuz-TMA spacecraft and resupplies the space station with Progress space transporters. After the initial ISS contract with NASA expired, Roscosmos and NASA, with the approval of the US government, entered into a space contract running until 2011, according to which Roscosmos will sell NASA spots on Soyuz spacecraft for approximately $21 million per person each way, thus $42 million to and back from the ISS per person, as well as provide Progress transport flights, at $50 million per Progress as outlined in the Exploration Systems Architecture Study. Roscosmos announced that according to this arrangement, crewed Soyuz flights would be doubled to 4 per year and Progress flights doubled to 8 per year beginning in 2008.

Roscosmos has provided space tourism for fare-paying passengers to ISS through the Space Adventures company. As of 2009, six space tourists have contracted with Roscosmos and have flown into space, each for an estimated fee of at least $20 million (USD).

Continued international collaboration in ISS missions has been thrown into doubt by the 2022 Russian invasion of Ukraine and related sanctions on Russia, although resupply missions continued in 2022 and 2023.

=== Suffa Space Observatory ===
In 2018, Russia agreed to help build the Suffa observatory in Uzbekistan. The observatory was started in 1991, but stalled after the fall of the USSR.

=== New piloted spacecraft ===
One of Roscosmos's projects that was widely covered in the media in 2005 was Kliper, a small lifting body reusable spacecraft. While Roscosmos had reached out to ESA and JAXA as well as others to share development costs of the project, it also stated that it will go forward with the project even without the support of other space agencies. This statement was backed by the approval of its budget for 2006–2015, which includes the necessary funding of Kliper. However, the Kliper program was cancelled in July 2006, and has been replaced by the new Prospective Piloted Transport System (Orel) project. As of August 2023, the first uncrewed and crewed test flights of Orel spacecraft are expected to occur in 2028.

== Launch control ==
The Russian Space Forces is the military counterpart of the Roscosmos with similar mission objectives as of the United States Space Force. The Russian branch was formed after the merging of the space components of the Russian Air Force and the Aerospace Defense Forces (VKO) in 2015. The Space Forces controls Russia's Plesetsk Cosmodrome launch facility. Roscosmos and the Space Forces share control of the Baikonur Cosmodrome, where Roscosmos reimburses the VKO for the wages of many of the flight controllers during civilian launches. Roscosmos and the Space Forces also share control of the Yuri Gagarin Cosmonaut Training Center. It has been announced that Russia is to build another spaceport in Tsiolkovsky, Amur Oblast. The Vostochny Cosmodrome was scheduled to be finished by 2018 having launched its first rocket in 2016.

== Subsidiaries ==
As of 2017, Roscosmos had the following subsidiaries:

- United Rocket and Space Corporation
  - Energia (38.2%)
- Progress Rocket Space Centre
- Yuri Gagarin Cosmonaut Training Center
- NPO Energomash
- NPO Lavochkin
- Khrunichev State Research and Production Space Center
- Strategicheskiye Punkty Upravleniya
- Glavcosmos
- Salavat Chemical Plant
- Turbonasos
- Moscow Institute of Thermal Technology
- IPK Mashpribor
- NPO Iskra
- Makeyev Rocket Design Bureau
- All-Russian Scientific Research Institute of Electromechanics
- Information Satellite Systems Reshetnev
- Russian Space Systems
- Sistemy precizionnogo priborostroenia
- Chemical Automatics Design Bureau
- Proton-PM
- Tekhnicheskiy Tsentr Novator
- AO EKHO
- NIIMP-K
- TSKB Geofizika
- Osoboye Konstruktorskoye Byuro Protivopozharnoy Tekhniki
- Tsentralnoye Konstruktorskoye Byuro Transportnogo Mashinostroyeniya
- NII komandnykh priborov
- NPO Avtomatiki
- Zlatoust Machine-Building Plant
- Krasnoyarsk Machine-Building Plant
- Miass Machine-Building Plant
- Moskovskiy zavod elektromekhanicheskoy apparatury
- Nauchno-issledovatelskiy Institut Elektromekhaniki
- NPO Novator
- PKP IRIS
- NPP Geofizika-Kosmos
- NPP Kvant
- NPP Polyus
- Ispytatelnyy tekhnicheskiy tsentr – NPO PM
- NPO PM – Maloye Konstruktorskoye Byuro
- NPO PM – Razvitiye
- Sibpromproyekt
- Scientific Research Institute of Precision Instruments
- NIIFI
- NPO Izmeritelnoy Tekhniki
- OKB MEI
- 106 Experimental Optical and Mechanical Plant
- OAO Bazalt
- Nauchno-inzhenernyy tsentr elektrotekhnicheskogo universiteta
- NPO Tekhnomash
- Keldysh Research Center
- Arsenal Design Bureau
- MOKB Mars
- NTTS Okhrana
- NII Mashinostroyeniya
- Scientific Production Association Of Automation And Instrument-Building
- OKB Fakel
- MNII Agat
- TsNIIMash
- Centre for Operation of Space Ground-based Infrastructure (TsENKI)
- NTTS Zarya
- NITs RKP

== See also ==
- American space program
- Russian space industry
  - Ministry of general Machine Building of the Soviet Union
  - TsNIIMash (Russian: ЦНИИмаш) is the Central Research Institute of Machine Building, an institute of the Russian aeronautics and space formed in 1946
  - List of Russian aerospace engineers
- Timeline of Russian inventions and technology records
- International Space Olympics
- Medal "For Merit in Space Exploration"
- List of government space agencies
