= NPO Toriy =

Company based in Moscow, Russia

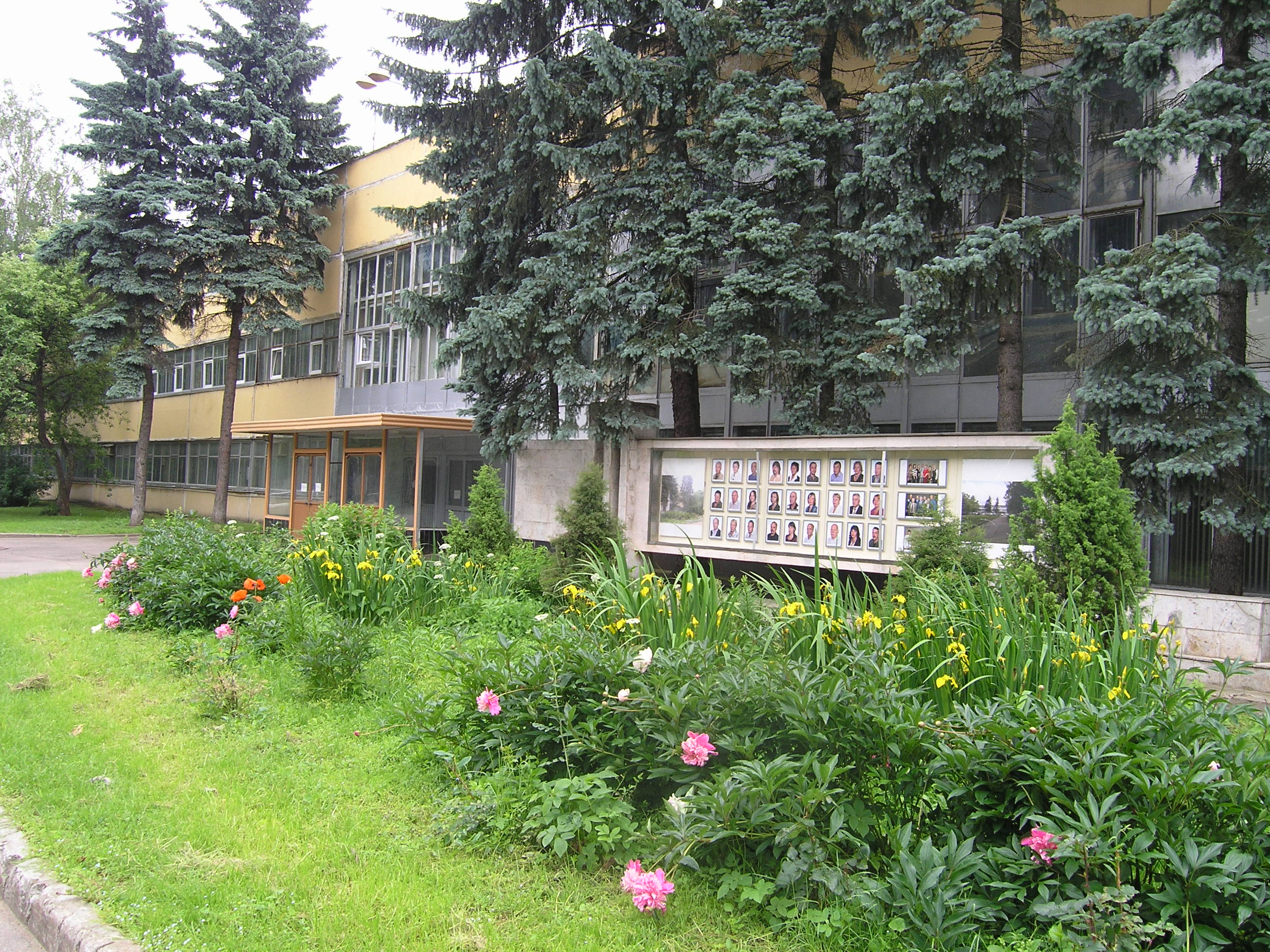
Main building of NPO Toriy

Toriy Scientific Production Association (Russian: НПО «Торий», romanized NPO Toriy) is a company based in Moscow, Russia. It is part of Ruselectronics.

The Toriy Scientific Production Association produces microwave tubes for use in radars, communications systems, television broadcasting electron accelerators (pulsed amplifiers), and nuclear reactors systems (gyrotrons) as well as medical equipment, and consumer goods. The association also produces linear accelerators, and claims to be the world's only producer of new high voltage vacuum control tubes (Titrons) for use in electron-beam welding installations and computer-based tomography.

The association includes the Titan Scientific-Research Institute, the main developer of microwave tubes and linear accelerators, and several smaller facilities located in and outside Moscow that produce medical equipment, vacuum pumps, and vacuum tube components.

== History ==
=== Soviet period ===
The scientific and production enterprise "Thorium" dates back to June 16, 1959, when a new enterprise of the electronic industry was established in the south-west of Moscow by a decree of the Central Committee of the CPSU and the Council of Ministers of the USSR. This enterprise was tasked with the most important task in the shortest possible time to develop and master in production powerful and super-powerful microwave devices unique in their parameters to provide the Moscow missile defense system.

The company was designed and built in the shortest possible time. Already in December 1961 the first stage of the engineering and production areas of the enterprise, equipped with the latest equipment, was put into operation. Scientists and engineers of NPP Istok (Fryazino) formed the basis of the enterprise's team in 1961-1963. In 1963 the construction was completed and the enterprise was put into operation.

On February 12, 1966 by order of the Minister of Electronic Industry of the USSR, the Scientific Research Institute of Electronic Devices NIIEP (n/I V-2491) with a pilot plant (n/I G-4808) was established on the basis of Research Institute No. 437 and a pilot plant with subordination to the 1st Main Directorate of the Ministry of Electronic Industry (MEP) of the USSR. On December 30, 1967 a government decree was adopted on the construction of a new production building of a pilot plant with a closed technological cycle.

On November 5, 1971 by Order of the Minister of Electronic Industry No. 228, NIIEP was renamed the Research Institute "Titan" (n/I V-2058) with a plant at the Research Institute "Titan" (n/I V-2123) subordinated to the 1st Main Directorate of the MEP of the USSR. On June 12, 1975 by order of the Minister of Electronic Industry No. 270 DSP, on the basis of the Research Institute "Thorium", the pilot plant at the Research Institute "Thorium", the Luch plant in Kostroma and the branch of the Research Institute "Thorium" (plant) in Vereya, the Scientific and Production Association "Thorium" - NPO "Thorium" (with the main enterprise of the Research Institute "Titan") with subordination to the 1st GU MEP of the USSR.

March 29, 1976 by decree of the Presidium of the Supreme Soviet of the USSR, the enterprise was awarded the Order of the October Revolution for outstanding achievements in the development of domestic microwave electronics of high capacity.

== Products ==
Microwave devices:

- Traveling wave lamps (LBW) for ground-based and airborne radars
- Amplifying klystrons for radar
- Amplifying klystrons for television broadcast transmitters
- Amplifying klystrons for control and communication systems
- Klystrons for linear accelerators
- Magnetron devices
- Electron accelerators
- Cathodes and cathode heating units

== Directors ==
1959-1962 - Ivanov Evgeny Khrisanfovich

1962-1964 - Goltsov Valentin Alexandrovich

1965-1972 - Lebedev Boris Petrovich

1972-1987 - Devyatkin Ivan Ivanovich

1987-1997 - Artyukh Igor Grigoryevich

1998-2005 - Ushakov Andrey Borisovich

2005-2010 - Stanislavchik Konstantin Vladislavovich

2010-2017 - Melnichuk Gennady Vasilyevich

from 2017 - Trofimov Dmitry Sergeevich
