= NPO Tekhnomash =

Subsidiary of Roscosmos

- Company type: Federal State Unitary Enterprise
- Founded: 1938
- Headquarters: Moscow, Russia
- Parent: Roscosmos
- Website: tmnpo.ru

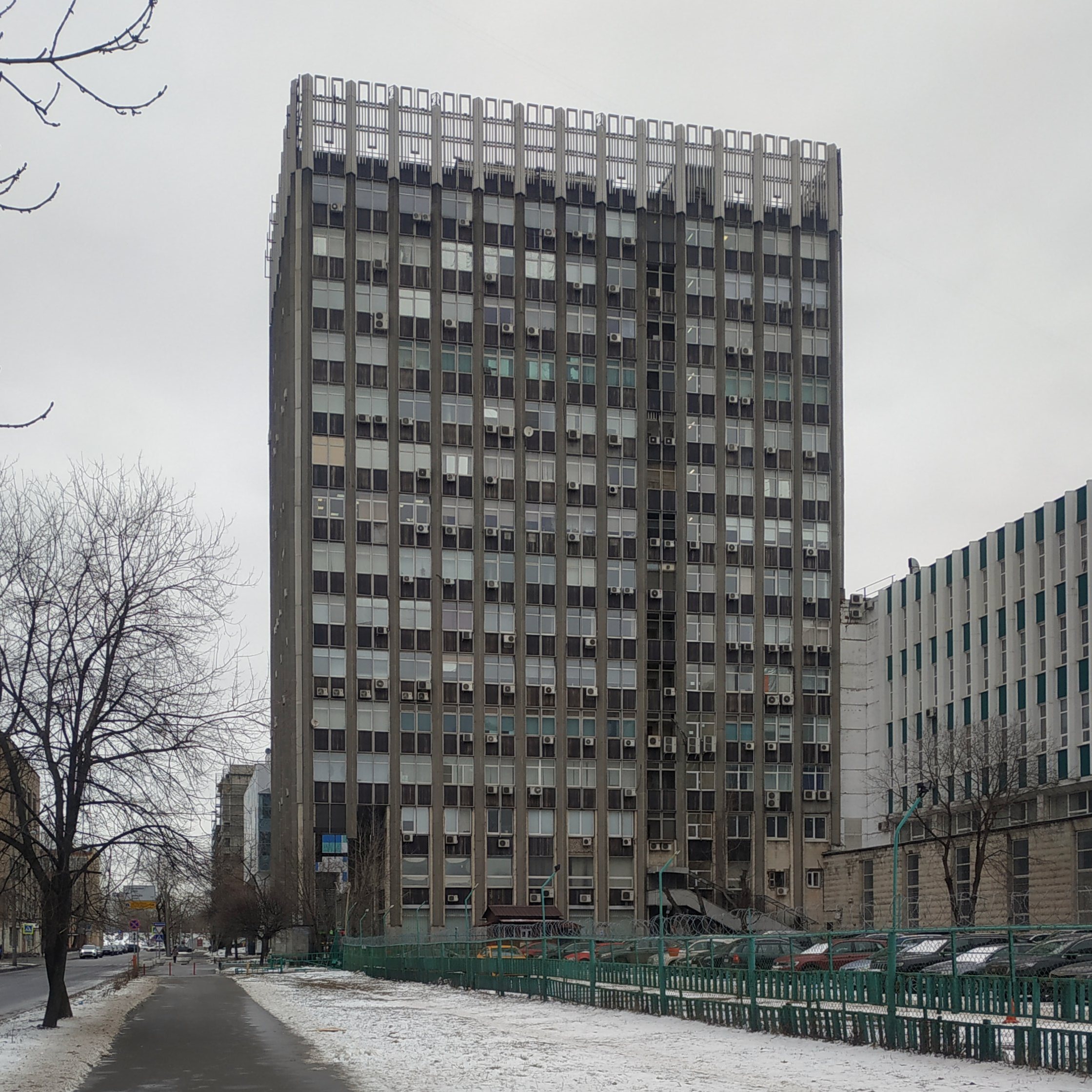
Office building of Tekhnomash in Marina Roshya, Moscow (2020)

Tekhnomash Scientific Production Association (Russian: НПО «Техномаш») is a company based in Moscow, Russia. It is currently part of Roscosmos.

NPO Tekhnomash specializes in the production of equipment and technology for the manufacture of rocket systems. Tekhnomash was established in 1938 to produce artillery weapons, and it has been working on rocket and space technology since 1946. It contributed to the creation of the Apollo-Soyuz, Salyut, Mir, Interkosmos and Buran programs.
