= United Rocket and Space Corporation =

Subsidiary of Roscosmos

United Rocket and Space Corporation Объединённая ракетно-космическая корпорация
- Type: Unitary enterprise
- Industry: Aerospace
- Founded: 2014; 12 years ago
- Founder: Government of Russia
- Headquarters: Moscow, Russia
- Products: Rockets
- Owner: Roscosmos
- Website: www.rosorkk.ru

The United Rocket and Space Corporation (Russian: Объединенная ракетно-космическая корпорация) or URSC is a Russian joint-stock corporation formed by the Russian government in 2013 to renationalize the Russian space sector. The government intended to do so in such a way as to "preserve and enhance the Roscosmos space agency". The reorganization continued into 2014 with a Sberbank cooperation agreement, and 2015 with a process to merge with the Russian Federal Space Agency to create the Roscosmos State Corporation. Roscosmos Space Agency, as a state agency, was abolished in December 2015 and the Roscosmos state-run corporation took over 1 January 2016 and the United Rocket and Space Corporation became part of the newly formed Roscosmos State Corporation in accordance with presidential decree No. 221.

== History ==
In announcing the new corporation in August 2013, Russian Deputy Prime Minister Dmitry Rogozin said "the failure-prone space sector is so troubled that it needs state supervision to overcome its problems." The name for the organization had first been provisionally floated in July 2013 when—three days following the failure of a Proton M launch—the Russian government announced that "extremely harsh measures" would be taken "and spell the end of the [Russian] space industry as we know it." Rogozin indicated it would be "consolidate[d] under a single state-controlled corporation within a year."

The company was founded in 2014 on the basis of the Scientific Research Institute of Space Instrumentation in order to implement the decree of the President of Russia No. 874 of December 2, 2013 "On the management system of the rocket and space industry". The decree stipulated that the corporation will take over manufacturing facilities from the Federal Space Agency (Roscosmos).

The President of Energia, Vitaly Lopota was removed from his post as president on August 1, 2014. Dmitry Rogoziin indicated that this was the start of "Long-awaited personnel reform in [the Russian] space industry ... Tough times require tough decisions."

In November 2014, it was announced that one part of the URSC charter is to increase the relative wages of those who work in the Russian space sector in order to attempt to counteract the low productivity and brain drain that has been hindering the industry. The average space industry employee was then paid 44,500 ₽ per month (US$900, or approximately US$10,000 per year). URSC projected that the Russian space sector would employ 196,000 people by 2016. URSC's publicly stated long-term goal in late 2014 was to increase productivity of the space sector, threefold while doubling real wages by 2025.

== Organization and entities ==
The company includes most companies and design bureaus, save for some defence companies. The corporation initially consisted of nine federal unitary enterprises to be turned into open joint-stock companies. The URSC's authorized capital included the shares of 13 other companies. Subsequently, each of them was expected to contribute 100 percent of their shares minus one share to the new corporation's authorized capital. The corporation was 100 percent state-owned.

By August 2013, United Rocket and Space Corporation planned to acquire a controlling interest in rocket-engine manufacturer Energia, of which the Russian government previously owned a 38 percent interest.

"The consolidation [of the Russian space industry] will absorb 33 space organizations, including 16 enterprises. The main focus will be on subcontractors and suppliers."

== Heavy-lift rocket ==
Following the URSC formation announcement, Oleg Ostapenko, the head of Roscosmos, the Russian Federal Space Agency, proposed in November 2013 that a new heavy lift launch vehicle be built for the Russian space program. The rocket would be intended to place a payload of 100 tonnes (220,000 lb) in a baseline low Earth orbit and is projected to be based on the Angara launch vehicle technology.

== Impact ==
Even the Russian mainstream press have called this a radical reorganization of an important Russian industry. For example, RIA Novosti called it a radical centralization of the Russian space industry.

In February 2014, Yevgeny Anisimov was removed from his position of head of Baikonur space center in Kazakhstan, after a 30-year career at the center, and having been head since 2010.

== Directors ==
- March 2014 - January 2015 - Igor Komarov
- January 2015 - June 2018 - Yuri Vlasov,
- June 2018 - September 2020 - Andrei Zheregelya
- October 2020 - January 2021 - Sergei Gureev
- January 2021 - October 2022 - Alexander Danilov
- October 2022 - October 2024 - Dmitry Shangin
- October 2024 - present - Alexey Berg

== See also ==
- Gazprom Space Systems
- Khrunichev State Research and Production Space Center
- NPO Energomash
- S.P. Korolev Rocket and Space Corporation Energia
