= NPO Avtomatiki =

Subsidiary of Roscosmos

Coordinates: 56°50′14″N 60°37′13″E

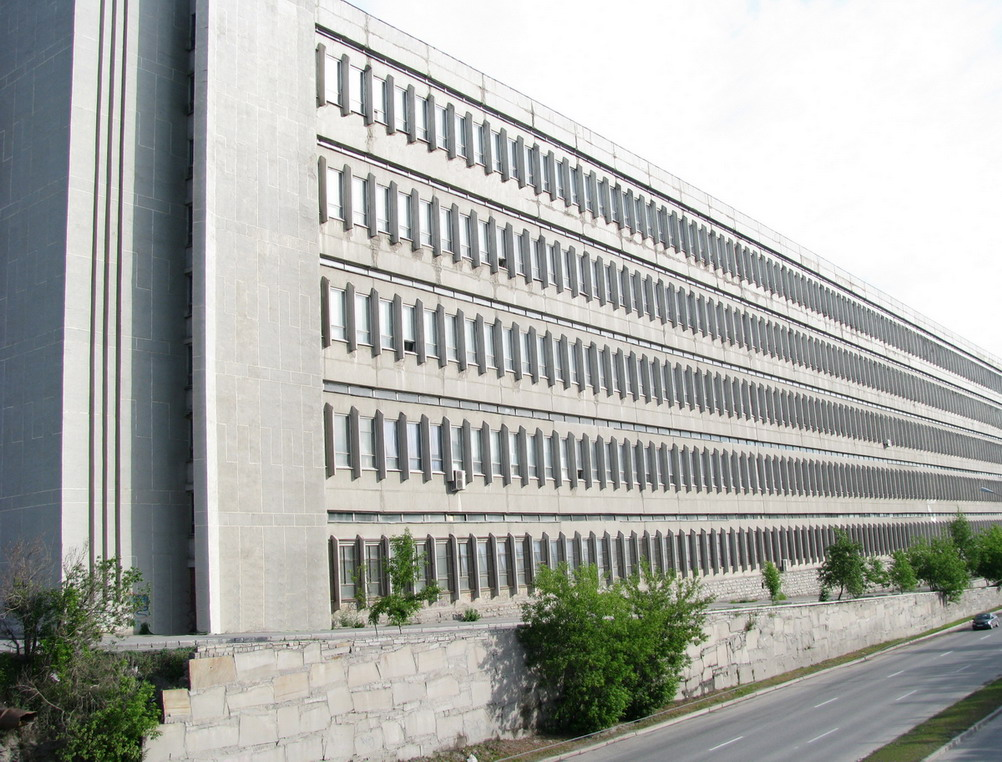
NPO Avtomatiki building in Yekaterinburg

NPO Avtomatiki (NPOA) aka State Enterprise Scientific Production Association Of Automation (Russian: Научно-производственное объединение автоматики) is a company based in Yekaterinburg, Russia. It is currently a Roscosmos subsidiary.

NPOA is a developer and producer of electronic control systems for missile complexes. It has a long line of civil electronics equipment, among which are communications systems, industrial computer-assisted management systems, and medical equipment.

NPOA includes the Scientific Research Institute of Automation and the Plant of Automation.
