= Deaths in April 2026 =

The following is a list of notable deaths in April 2026.

Entries for each day are listed alphabetically by surname. A typical entry lists information in the following sequence:

- Name, age, country of citizenship at birth, subsequent country of citizenship (if applicable), reason for notability, cause of death (if known), and reference.

== April 2026 ==
=== 1 ===
- Sergey Bystritskiy, 62, Russian actor (Valentin and Valentina, From the Life of Fyodor Kuzkin, 100 Days Before the Command) and television director.
- Salvador Castañeda Álvarez, 79, Mexican writer.
- Mike Chaplin, 82, British artist, mesothelioma.
- Gianluca Cherubini, 52, Italian footballer (Reggiana, Chieti, Torres).
- Birgit Collin-Langen, 69, German politician, MEP (2012–2019).
- Donald V. DeRosa, 85, American academic administrator, president of the University of the Pacific (1995–2009).
- Andreas Engel, 82, Swiss biologist.
- Dick Farley, 79, American football player (San Diego Chargers) and coach (Williams Ephs).
- Jack Harliwich, 95, New Zealand cricketer (Canterbury).
- Hans-Jürgen Kreische, 78, German football player (Dynamo Dresden, East Germany national team) and manager (Dynamo Dresden), Olympic bronze medalist (1972).
- Rosemary Kurtz, 95, American politician, member of the Illinois House of Representatives (2001–2005).
- Suki Lahav, 74, Israeli violinist (E Street Band), singer, and lyricist.
- Jacques Michon, 80, Canadian literary historian and academic.
- Dalia Nausheen, 71, Bangladeshi Nazrul Sangeet singer, cancer.
- L. P. E. Parker, 93, British classical scholar.
- PSD, 51, American rapper and producer, lung infection.
- Dick Roberge, 91, Canadian ice hockey player (Johnstown Jets, New Westminster Royals, Pittsburgh Hornets) and coach.
- Louis Saia, 75, Canadian film director (Les Boys) and screenwriter.
- Tariq al-Sawah, 68, Egyptian Guantanamo Bay detainee. (death announced on this date)
- Peter V. Smith, 78, Australian footballer (Melbourne, Carlton).
- Andrew Strathern, 87, British anthropologist.
- Jean-Michel Testu, 88, French politician, deputy (1981–1986, 1988–1993).
- Tom Valenti, 67, American chef.

=== 2 ===
- Roberto Arditti, 60, Italian journalist (Il Tempo), television writer and radio personality.
- Oleh Avdieiev, 52, Ukrainian Olympic luger (1998, 2002), stabbed.
- Mels Bekboev, 73, Kyrgyz military officer and politician, chief of the general staff of armed forces (2004–2006).
- Trygve Berge, 93, Norwegian Olympic alpine skier (1956).
- Louis Besson, 88, French politician, deputy (1976–1989), secretary of state for housing (1997–2001), and twice mayor of Chambéry.
- Nicolás Biglianti, 51, Uruguayan footballer (Liverpool (Montevideo), Rampla Juniors, Peñarol), pancreatic cancer.
- Millicent Burgess, 102, Bermudian-born Canadian educator.
- Víctor Cabrera, 68, Chilean footballer (San Luis, Everton, Regional Atacama). (body discovered on this date)
- Estelle Bee Dagum, 91, Argentine-Canadian statistician.
- Ronald Eddy, 94, Canadian politician, Ontario MPP (1992–1995) and mayor of Brant (1999–2018).
- Maribel Flores, 76, Spanish politician, member of the Parliament of Andalusia (1990–2004) and senator (1996–2015).
- Dee Freeman, 66, American actress (The Young and the Restless), lung cancer.
- Shozin Fukui, 64, Japanese film director (964 Pinocchio, Rubber's Lover, S-94) and screenwriter.
- James Gadson, 86, American drummer (Charles Wright & the Watts 103rd Street Rhythm Band) and session musician.
- Kristian Gerner, 83, Swedish historian and author.
- Neville Glover, 70, Australian rugby league player (Parramatta Eels, Penrith Panthers, national team).
- Tahir Jalil Habbush, 75–76, Iraqi intelligence official (Habbush letter), director of the Iraqi Intelligence Service (1995–2003).
- Miroslav Jakeš, 75, Czech polar explorer, glacier fall.
- Yoshihisa Kishimoto, 64, Japanese video game developer (Double Dragon, River City).
- Javier López Marcano, 71, Spanish politician, member of the Parliament of Cantabria (1999–2015, since 2023) and three-time regional minister, mayor of Torrelavega (1999–2003), heart attack.
- Jean-Claude Lozac'hmeur, 85, French linguist, historian and academic.
- Misua, 27, Filipino drag performer (Drag Race Philippines).
- Peter Neumeyer, 96, German-American academic.
- Reda bin Mohammed Saeed Obeid, 90, Saudi academic and civil servant, member of the Consultative Assembly of Saudi Arabia (1994–1998).
- Justin Panakkal, 90, Indian Catholic priest and composer.
- Dan Piachaud, 89, Sri Lankan cricketer (Oxford University, MCC, national team).
- Mykola Pinchuk, 79, Ukrainian footballer (Armavir, Zorya Luhansk, Soviet Union national team). (death announced on this date)
- George Plafker, 97, American seismologist.
- Konstantas Ramelis, 88, Lithuanian politician, MP (2008–2012).
- Col Ratcliff, 96, Australian footballer (Western Suburbs).
- Ian Rutherford, 68, New Zealand cricketer (Otago, Central Districts, Central Otago), traffic collision.
- Nick Savva, 91, Cypriot-born British greyhound trainer and breeder.
- Aron Shai, 83, Israeli historian.
- Geoffrey Smith, 82, American-born British radio presenter (BBC Radio 3), author and musician.
- Moody R. Tidwell III, 87, American attorney.
- Mahinda Wijesekara, 83, Sri Lankan politician, minister of fisheries (2001–2007) and MP (1989–2010).
- Jerrold Zar, 84, American biologist.

=== 3 ===
- John Baxter, 72, New Zealand artist.
- Nicholas Bosanquet, 84, British health economist and political activist, stroke.
- Prashant Bose, 82, Indian Maoist militant.
- Nanni Cagnone, 86, Italian poet.
- John Cheek, 70, American Hall of Fame lacrosse player (national team).
- Bettina Cirone, 92, American photographer.
- Fred Curry, 82, American professional wrestler (NWA, NWF).
- Rod Diridon Sr., 87, American politician, chairman of the CHSRA (2001–2003), sepsis.
- Carol Greitzer, 101, American politician and abortion activist, New York City councilwoman (1969–1991).
- Guy Jutras, 95, Canadian boxing referee and judge.
- Dennis Campbell Kennedy, 89, Irish journalist (Belfast Telegraph, The Irish Times).
- Mattias Mainiero, 70, Italian journalist. (death announced on this date)
- Vittorio Messori, 84, Italian journalist (Avvenire, La Stampa, Corriere della Sera) and Christian writer.
- Karen Muenster, 83, American politician, member of the South Dakota Senate (1985–1992), complications from Alzheimer's disease.
- Augustine Nshimye, 79, Ugandan jurist, justice of the Supreme Court (2015–2017), cancer.
- Ricardo Ortiz, 51, Spanish bullfighter, gored.
- Gilbertson Sangma, 70, Indian footballer (Assam Police, Assam, national team).
- Terry Schreiber, 89, American theater director, heart attack.
- Machana Shamukuni, 49, Botswanan politician, minister of justice (2022–2024).
- Michele Massimo Tarantini, 83, Italian film director (Confessions of a Lady Cop, A Man Called Magnum, Taxi Girl).
- James Uerikua, 43, Namibian politician, MP (since 2025), traffic collision.
- Gerard Williams, 73, American football player (Washington Redskins, San Francisco 49ers). (death announced on this date)
- Butch Wilson, 84, American football player (Baltimore Colts, New York Giants), cancer.
- Thomas Zipp, 59, German artist.

=== 4 ===
- Carl Anthony, 87, American architect.
- Paolo Cherchi, 88, Italian philologist and historian of literature.
- James Craigen, 87, Scottish politician, MP (1974–1987).
- Bob Duliba, 91, American baseball player (St. Louis Cardinals, Los Angeles Angels, Boston Red Sox).
- Garner Ekstran, 86, American football player (Saskatchewan Roughriders, BC Lions).
- Pearl Fryar, 86, American topiary artist.
- Gregory Hannon, 61, British molecular biologist.
- Harry Keyishian, 93, American literary editor (FDU Press) and academic.
- Raynella Leath, 77, American exonerated murder suspect.
- Ling Liong Sik, 82, Malaysian politician, acting prime minister (1988), MP (1974–2004), and minister of transport (1986–2003).
- Iris Long, 91, American chemist and activist.
- Aziz Mekouar, 75, Moroccan diplomat, ambassador to China (since 2018).
- Gian Carlo Michelini, 90, Italian-Taiwanese Roman Catholic priest and artistic director, co-founder of the YICFFF.
- Sajida Obaed, 68, Iraqi folk singer, lung cancer.
- Arne Olsen, 64, Canadian screenwriter (Mighty Morphin Power Rangers: The Movie, Cop and a Half, All Dogs Go to Heaven 2), complications from cancer.
- Paul Orsatti, 84, French footballer (Bastia, Paris FC) and manager (Gazélec Ajaccio).
- Simon Oxley, 56, British graphic designer.
- Gerald Paddio, 60, American basketball player (Cleveland Cavaliers, Indiana Pacers, New York Knicks), traffic collision.
- Paola Pelagatti, 99, Italian archaeologist.
- Mark Piznarski, 71, American television producer and director (Gossip Girl, NYPD Blue, Relativity).
- Horst Schmid, 92, German-born Canadian politician, Alberta MLA (1971–1986).
- Cyrille Schott, 75, French civil servant, prefect of Hérault (2007–2008), puisne judge of the Cour des Comptes (2009–2013).
- Thomas Ungar, 94, Austrian conductor.
- Marian Van Landingham, 88, American politician, member of the Virginia House of Delegates (1983–2006).
- Evelyn Wilson, 66, American jurist, justice of the Kansas Supreme Court (2020–2025), complications from amyotrophic lateral sclerosis.
- Yun Ki-hyeon, 83, South Korean Go player.
- Roberto Zapperi, 94, Italian historian and writer.

=== 5 ===
- Victor Agbégnénou, Togolese inventor and researcher.
- Alvin L, 67, Brazilian singer-songwriter, heart attack.
- Zori Balayan, 91, Armenian writer.
- Anton Bebler, 89, Slovenian politician and diplomat.
- Jacques-Armand Cardon, 89, French cartoonist and illustrator.
- Chen Lihua, 85, Chinese property developer.
- Mani Kumar Chetri, 105, Indian cardiologist, complications from a fall.
- Viola Claesson, 86, Swedish politician, MP (1985–1991).
- Tony Davis, 73, American football player (Cincinnati Bengals, Tampa Bay Buccaneers, Boston Breakers), complications from Parkinson's disease.
- Brian Garvey, 88, English footballer (Hull City, Watford, Colchester United).
- Ramon Gieling, 71, Dutch film director, screenwriter and author.
- Adán Godoy, 89, Chilean footballer (Santiago Morning, national team).
- Adriano Goldschmied, 82, Italian fashion designer, cancer.
- A. B. M. Anowarul Haque, 76–77, Bangladeshi politician, MP (2008–2014).
- Paul Knapman, 81, British coroner.
- Donn Landee, 79, American record producer (5150) and recording engineer (Minute by Minute, 1984). (death announced on this date)
- Donlyn Lyndon, 90, American architect (Condominium 1).
- Rusmir Mahmutćehajić, 77, Bosnian writer and politician.
- Albert Mazibuko, 77, South African choral singer (Ladysmith Black Mambazo).
- Danny Miranda, 47, Cuban baseball player, Olympic champion (2004), intestinal blockage.
- Marianne Nachmann, 94, German luger, world championship bronze medalist (1955).
- Josep Piera, 78, Spanish poet and author.
- Sir Craig Reedie, 84, Scottish sports administrator, president of WADA (2014–2019), vice-president of the IOC (2012–2016), and chairman of the BOA (1992–2005).
- Eberhard Riedel, 88, German Olympic alpine skier (1960, 1964, 1968).
- Mario Enrique Ríos Montt, 94, Guatemalan Roman Catholic prelate, bishop of Escuintla (1974–1984) and auxiliary bishop of Guatemala (1987–2010).
- Chana Rungsaeng, 94, Thai politician, MP (1976).
- Lawrence J. Ryan, 93, Australian-born German scholar of literature.
- Thitinan Saengnak, 65, Thai politician, MP (2019–2023), suicide.
- Danielle Sheypuk, 48, American psychologist.
- Tim Slessor, 95, British documentarian.
- Piero Antonio Toma, 91, Italian journalist (Il Sole 24 Ore, la Repubblica), writer and publisher.
- Judith Trotter, 90, New Zealand diplomat, ambassador to France (1988–1992) and Italy (1994–1998).
- José Ulloa, 92, Spanish film director (Veinte pasos para la muerte) and actor.
- Yvette Van Voorhees, 72, American dancer and actress (Xanadu).
- David Wiffen, 84, English-Canadian folk singer-songwriter ("Driving Wheel").
- Francesco Zani, 87, Italian rugby union player (Fiamme Oro Rugby, SU Agen, national team).
- Arnold Zenker, 87, American media broadcaster.

=== 6 ===
- Bae Myeong-in, 93, South Korean politician, minister of justice (1982–1985).
- Seán Barrett, 81, Irish politician, TD (1981–2002, 2007–2020), minister of education (1986–1987) and twice of defence.
- Mihail Belchev, 79, Bulgarian singer, songwriter and poet.
- Pietro Calogero, 86, Italian magistrate.
- Konrad Carl, 96, German trade unionist, president of IG BSE (1982–1991) and IFBWW (1985–1993).
- Álvaro Cassuto, 87, Portuguese composer and conductor.
- Gwendolyn Chisolm, 66, American rapper (The Sequence) and songwriter ("Funk You Up").
- John Andrew Claughton, 47, English cricketer (Oxford University).
- Miguel Ángel De Marco, 86, Argentine military officer, academic and historian, member of the National Academy of History of Argentina.
- Vladislav Galgonek, 79, Czech photographer.
- Nancy Garapick, 64, Canadian swimmer, double Olympic bronze medalist (1976).
- Robert G. Gard Jr., 98, American general.
- Nijaz Gracić, 68, Bosnian businessman and football executive, chairman of FK Olimpik (2006–2016).
- Gene Hooks, 98, American university athletics director (Wake Forest).
- Majid Khademi, Iranian general and intelligence officer, head of the IRGC Intelligence Organization (since 2025), airstrike.
- Yalçın Küçük, 87, Turkish socialist writer, economist and historian.
- Mary Nomura, 100, American singer.
- Angela Pleasence, 84, English actress (Hitler: The Last Ten Days, Coronation Street, Doctor Who).
- Nick Pope, 60, British journalist and television personality (Ancient Aliens, UFOs Declassified), oesophageal cancer.
- Gabriel Rosenstock, 76, Irish poet and writer, cancer.
- Christian Schwarz-Schilling, 95, Austrian-born German politician, minister of post and telecommunications (1982–1992) and High Representative for Bosnia and Herzegovina (2006–2007).
- Beppe Sebaste, 66, Italian writer, poet and journalist (L'Unità, La Repubblica).
- Juarez Teixeira, 97, Brazilian footballer (Jabaquara, Grêmio, national team).
- Yataro Tsuda, 73, Japanese politician, member of the House of Councillors (2004–2016).
- Helena Vovsová, 100, Czech resistance member.
- Yangling Dorje, 95, Chinese politician, chairman of the Tibet Autonomous Regional Committee of the CPCC (1984–1986).

=== 7 ===
- Miroj Abdulloyev, 77, Tajik politician.
- Rolf Alsing, 78, Swedish journalist (Aftonbladet).
- Dame Averil Cameron, 86, British historian.
- Tom Corontzos, 56, American football player.
- Muguette Dini, 86, French politician, senator (2004–2014).
- Anatoly Dolmatov, 75, Russian politician, member of the Soviet of the Union (1987–1989).
- Rosemary Edghill, 69, American author, sepsis.
- Vyacheslav Golishev, 75, Uzbek politician, minister of economy (2005–2006).
- Barbara Gordon, 90, American filmmaker and producer.
- Patrick Ground, 93, British politician, MP (1983–1992).
- Alex Hilton, 61, Canadian boxer.
- Viktor Kravchenko, 84, Russian triple jumper, Olympic bronze medalist (1964).
- Mircea Lucescu, 80, Romanian football player (Dinamo București, national team) and manager (national team), complications from a heart attack.
- Albert N. Martin, 91, American Reformed Baptist minister.
- Ihor Mityukov, 73, Ukrainian diplomat and politician, minister of finance (1997–2001), ambassador to the UK (2002–2005) and the EU (1995–1997).
- Matlab Mutallimli, 76, Azerbaijani politician, MP (1991–2000).
- Chuck Nieson, 83, American baseball player (Minnesota Twins).
- Seán Ó Laoire, 79, Irish architect and urban designer.
- Michael Patrick, 35, Irish actor and writer (My Left Nut), complications from motor neurone disease.
- Jan Pieterse, 83, Dutch racing cyclist, Olympic champion (1964).
- Charles Pilet, 95, French academic and researcher.
- Rodney Pyles, 80, American politician, member of the West Virginia House of Delegates (2016–2020).
- Eva Ramm, 100, Norwegian psychologist and essayist.
- Larry Santos, 84, American pop singer-songwriter.
- Valentina Savostyanova, 77, Russian politician, MP (2000–2007).
- Adolf Scherwitzl, 87, Austrian Olympic biathlete (1964, 1968).
- Louis Tapardjuk, 73, Canadian politician, Nunavut MLA (2004–2013).
- Jim Whittaker, 97, American mountaineer (1963 American Mount Everest expedition).

=== 8 ===
- Mario Adorf, 95, German actor (Major Dundee, The Tin Drum, Fedora) and writer.
- Francis Alappatt, Indian Catholic priest and physician.
- Doug Allan, 74, Scottish wildlife photographer and cameraman.
- Srećko Bogdan, 69, Croatian footballer (Dinamo Zagreb, Karlsruher SC, Yugoslavia national team).
- Imrich Bugár, 70, Czech discus thrower, Olympic silver medalist (1980).
- Ahmet Altay Cengizer, 71, Turkish diplomat.
- Abu Hasem Khan Choudhury, 88, Indian politician, MP (2006–2024) and minister of health and family welfare (2012–2014).
- Charles Delhez, 74, Belgian Roman Catholic priest and sociologist.
- Roger Establet, 87–88, French educational sociologist.
- Terry Gabinski, 87, American politician, member of the Chicago City Council (1969–1998).
- Tarun Ghosh, 73, Bangladeshi animation editor (Nirontor) and art director (Kittonkhola), cardiac complication.
- Abass Kaboua, 63, Togolese politician, senator (since 2025).
- David Kabua, 74, Marshallese politician, president (2020–2024) and minister in assistance to the president (2016), cancer.
- Ali Hussain Khan, 70, Pakistani politician, Punjab MPA (since 2024). (death announced on this date)
- Mohsina Kidwai, 94, Indian politician, twice MP, minister of health (1984–1986) and urban development (1986–1989).
- Koo Sze-yiu, 76–77, Hong Kong political activist, rectal cancer.
- Davey Lopes, 80, American baseball player (Los Angeles Dodgers, Chicago Cubs) and manager (Milwaukee Brewers), World Series champion (1981, 2008), complications from Parkinson's disease.
- Leïla Marouane, 65, Tunisian-born French creative writer and journalist (El Watan, Jeune Afrique).
- Nguyễn Đức Mậu, 78, Vietnamese poet.
- Eldrid Nordbø, 83, Norwegian politician, minister of trade and shipping (1990–1991).
- Harald Ofner, 93, Austrian lawyer and politician, minister of justice (1983–1987) and MP (1979–1983, 1986–2002).
- Sherig-ool Oorzhak, 83, Russian politician, head of the Republic of Tuva (1992–2007).
- Melchor Peredo, 99, Mexican muralist.
- Kostakis Pierides, 85, Cypriot footballer (Pezoporikos Larnaca, Olympiakos Nicosia, national team).
- Peter Rull Jr., 80, Hong Kong Olympic sport shooter (1984).
- Lakshmanan Sathyavagiswaran, 77, Indian-American medical examiner, Los Angeles County chief medical examiner-coroner (1992–2013, 2016–2017).
- Nancy Sheppard, 96, American trick rider.
- Vaughn Solomon Schofield, 82, Canadian vice-regal, lieutenant governor of Saskatchewan (2012–2018).
- Duško Vujošević, 67, Montenegrin basketball coach (Partizan, Pallacanestro Brescia, Bosnia national team), heart and kidney disease.
- Carla Walschap, 93, Belgian writer and teacher.
- Mohammed Washah, 39–40, Palestinian journalist, airstrike.
- Mark Weissman, 77, American politician, member of the Florida House of Representatives (2000–2002). (death announced on this date)
- Gerd Winner, 89, German painter and sculptor.

=== 9 ===
- Robert Bagg, 90, American poet.
- Afrika Bambaataa, 68, American DJ and rapper ("Planet Rock", "Looking for the Perfect Beat", "Renegades of Funk"), prostate cancer.
- Jeremy Beecham, Baron Beecham, 81, British politician, member of the House of Lords (2010–2021), complications from Alzheimer's disease.
- Ari Ben-Menahem, 97, German-born Israeli mathematician and geophysicist.
- Robin Bridgeman, 3rd Viscount Bridgeman, 95, British businessman and politician, member of the House of Lords (since 1983).
- Billy Bryan, 87, American baseball player (Kansas City Athletics, New York Yankees, Washington Senators).
- John Edelman, 90, American baseball player (Milwaukee Braves).
- Björgvin Halldórsson, 74, Icelandic musician.
- Sammy Forcillo, 75, Canadian politician.
- Jock Freedman, 96, American bridge engineer.
- Eirwyn George, 89, Welsh poet.
- C. D. Gopinath, 96, Indian test cricketer (Madras, national team).
- Kamal Kharazi, 81, Iranian politician, minister of foreign affairs (1997–2005), permanent representative to the UN (1989–1997), and member of the EDC (since 2022), injuries sustained from an airstrike.
- Zulfiqar Ali Khosa, 90, Pakistani politician, governor of Punjab (1999) and senator (2012–2018).
- Erik Kruskopf, 95, Finnish art critic.
- Erik Lallerstedt, 79, Swedish chef and restaurateur.
- Ray Monette, 79, American musician (Rare Earth).
- Jackie Moore, 93, American basketball player (Syracuse Nationals, Milwaukee Hawks, Philadelphia Warriors).
- Domingos Lucas Naftal, 84, Mozambican footballer (Tirsense, Porto, Vitória Guimarães).
- Michael Paget-Wilkes, 74, English Anglican cleric, archdeacon of Warwick (1990–2009).
- Angelo Pavan, 95, Italian politician, senator (1979–1994).
- Valery Rukhledev, 81, Russian wrestler and sports administrator, president of the CISS (2013–2018).
- Stephen M. Schwebel, 97, American jurist, judge (1981–2000), vice president (1994–1997) and president (1997–2000) of the ICJ.
- Graeme Stevens, 93, New Zealand paleontologist.
- Jimmy Sullivan, 44, Australian politician, Queensland MLA (since 2020).
- Héctor Vargas Haya, 98, Peruvian politician, deputy (1963–1968, 1980–1990), president of the Chamber of Deputies (1988–1989).
- Arkady Yanenko, 85, Russian physicist and politician, people's deputy of the Soviet Union (1989–1991).

=== 10 ===
- Magaly Achach Solís, 71, Mexican politician, mayor of Benito Juárez (1999–2002), member of the Chamber of Deputies (1991–1994) and twice of the Congress of Quintana Roo.
- Vojtěch Adam, 75, Czech politician and surgeon, MP (2008–2017).
- Aldwyth, 90, American artist.
- Matt Arnold, 50, New Zealand graphic designer, traffic collision.
- James Wilfred Bridges, 87, British toxicologist and academic.
- Dinah Christie, 83, Canadian actress (Check It Out!) and singer (Party Game), complications from dementia.
- Peter Nworie Chukwu, 60, Nigerian Roman Catholic prelate, bishop of Abakaliki (since 2021).
- Celeste Dupuy-Spencer, 46, American painter.
- Eliot Engel, 79, American politician, member of the U.S. House of Representatives (1989–2021), complications from Parkinson's disease.
- Barney Fisher, 78, American politician, member of the Missouri House of Representatives (2005–2013).
- Sir Alan Frampton, 96, New Zealand agricultural economist.
- William Edwin Franklin, 95, American Roman Catholic prelate, bishop of Davenport (1993–2006) and auxiliary bishop of Dubuque (1987–1993).
- Thomas Frost, 101, Austrian-born American record producer.
- Vootele Hansen, 64, Estonian politician, MP (1995–2003) and minister of the environment (1994–1995).
- Anja Hatakka, 88, Finnish actress and beauty pageant competitor.
- Sharon Hawke, 64, New Zealand Māori activist.
- Colette Khoury, 95, Syrian novelist and poet.
- Harry Kim, 74, American trumpeter (The Phenix Horns), cancer.
- Sid Krofft, 96, Canadian puppeteer and television writer (H.R. Pufnstuf, Land of the Lost, Sigmund and the Sea Monsters).
- Marianne Lederer, 91, French translation scholar.
- Jacek Magiera, 49, Polish football player (Legia Warsaw, Raków Częstochowa) and manager (Śląsk Wrocław).
- Anita Martinez, 100, American politician, Dallas City councillor (1969–1973).
- William Leon McBride, 88, American philosopher.
- Browning Nagle, 57, American football player (New York Jets), colon cancer.
- Bob Novogratz, 89, American Hall of Fame football player (Army Cadets).
- Maria Agostina Pellegatta, 87, Italian politician, deputy (1972–1979), senator (2006–2008).
- Sir Hayden Phillips, 83, British civil servant, permanent secretary to the Lord Chancellor's office (1998–2003).
- S. R. Ramaswamy, 88, Indian writer and journalist.
- Rudi Schmitt, 98, German politician, member of the Landtag of Hesse (1954–1968), MP (1980–1987).
- Gabor Szilasi, 98, Canadian photographer.
- Sonam Wangchuk, 61, Indian army colonel, heart attack.
- Gerry Ward, 84, American basketball player (Boston Celtics, Philadelphia 76ers, Chicago Bulls).
- Jan Williams, 87, English actress (From Russia with Love, The Rag Trade, Doctor Who).

=== 11 ===
- Ilse von Alpenheim, 99, Austrian pianist.
- May Angeli, 88, French artist and author.
- Sonja Barend, 86, Dutch television presenter.
- Michael Baroody, 79, American lobbyist.
- Pedro Ramayá Beltrán, 96, Colombian caña de millo player, pleural effusion.
- Paul Berry, 68, English footballer (Oxford United, Witney United).
- Stefanos Borbokis, 59, Greek football player (PAOK, national team) and manager (Thermaikos Thermis).
- Vojtěch Broža, 90, Czech hydraulic engingeer.
- Cho Sang-rae, 89, South Korean politician, MP (1981–1988).
- Hüsamettin Cindoruk, 92, Turkish politician, acting president (1993), twice member and speaker (1991–1995) of the Grand National Assembly.
- Cleighten Cornelius, 49, New Zealand cricketer (Canterbury) and winemaker, myeloma.
- Marian Cygan, 85, Polish football player (Cracovia, Tarnovia Tarnów) and manager (Hutnik Kraków).
- John Dalgleish Donaldson, 84, Scottish-Australian mathematician.
- Murt Duggan, 84–85, Irish hurler (Gortnahoe–Glengoole, Ballingarry).
- Mick Erwin, 82, Australian footballer (Richmond, Collingwood).
- Phil Garner, 76, American baseball player (Houston Astros, Pittsburgh Pirates) and manager (Milwaukee Brewers), pancreatic cancer.
- Manuel Gurría Ordóñez, 94, Mexican politician, two-time deputy, senator (1991–1992), governor of Tabasco (1992–1994).
- Candice Hansen-Koharcheck, 73, American planetary scientist, cancer.
- Sutan Harhara, 73, Indonesian football player (Persija Jakarta, national team) and manager.
- Amivi Homawoo, 51, Togolese visual artist and videographer.
- Tom H. John, 95, American art director (Taxi), production designer and set designer (The Wiz), Emmy winner (1965, 1973, 1976).
- Peter Lynn, 79, New Zealand engineer and kite maker, cancer.
- Marcel Niat Njifenji, 91, Cameroonian politician, president of the senate (2013–2026) and mayor of Bangangté (2002–2007).
- John Nolan, 87, English actor (Person of Interest, Terror, Batman Begins).
- Clifford Otte, 93, American politician, member of the Wisconsin State Assembly (1993–1999).
- Chris Payton-Jones, 30, American football player (Arizona Cardinals, Minnesota Vikings, Tennessee Titans), traffic collision.
- Lionel Rosenblatt, 82, American diplomat, president of Refugees International (1990–2001), cancer.
- Nino Russo, 86, Italian film director, screenwriter and playwright.
- Vija Vētra, 103, Latvian dancer and choreographer.
- Mike Westbrook, 90, English jazz pianist and composer.
- Jacques Witt, 67–68, French journalist (Dernières Nouvelles d'Alsace, Sipa Press).
- Reinhold Wittig, 89, German board game designer (The Game) and geologist.
- Flo Oy Wong, 87, American artist, curator and educator.

=== 12 ===
- Laurie Abrahams, 72, English footballer (California Surf, Charlton Athletic, Tulsa Roughnecks).
- Shafique Ahmed, 88, Bangladeshi lawyer, minister of law (2009–2013).
- Asha Bhosle, 92, Indian playback singer ("Chura Liya Hai Tumne Jo Dil Ko", "Dum Maro Dum", "Piya Tu Ab To Aja"), multiple organ failure.
- Salifu Adam Braimah, 60, Ghanaian politician, MP (2017–2021).
- Aldo Cacioppo, 81, Italian basketball player and coach.
- Ursula Donath, 94, German runner, Olympic bronze medalist (1960).
- Dominic Frimpong, 20, Ghanaian footballer (Berekum Chelsea), shot.
- Bob Hall, 74, American wheelchair racer, complications from pneumonia.
- Václav Hybš, 90, Czech musician, trumpeter and conductor.
- Janusz Kamiński, 92, Polish politician, minister of transport, navigation and communications (1987–1989).
- Csaba Kuzma, 71, Hungarian Olympic boxer (1980).
- Alonso López, 69, Colombian footballer (Millonarios, national team).
- Hossein Mousavi Tabrizi, 78, Iranian Shiite mujtahid, judge and politician.
- Delphine Noels, 53, Belgian film director.
- Leo Nowak, 97, German Roman Catholic prelate, apostolic administrator (1990–1994) and bishop (1994–2004) of Magdeburg, complications from surgery.
- Bill Patmon, 80, American politician, member of the Cleveland City Council (1990–2001) and Ohio House of Representatives (2011–2018).
- Edgardo Roque, 88, Filipino Olympic basketball player (1960).
- Nicky Smith, 57, English football player (Colchester United, Braintree Town) and manager (AFC Sudbury), cancer.
- Frank Stack, 88, American cartoonist (Our Cancer Year).

=== 13 ===
- Annetta Alexandridis, 58, German-born American classical archaeologist and art historian.
- Hans-Jürgen Becher, 84, German footballer (Schalke 04).
- Moya Brennan, 73, Irish folk singer (Clannad).
- Leon Bridges, 93, American architect and academic.
- Patrick Campbell-Lyons, 82, Irish musician (Nirvana) and composer.
- Benjamín Castillo Plascencia, 80, Mexican Roman Catholic prelate, auxiliary bishop of Guadalajara (1999–2003), bishop of Tabasco (2003–2010) and Celaya (2010–2021).
- Trish Crossin, 70, Australian politician, senator (1998–2013), heart attack.
- Stephen Crotts, 75, American Presbyterian minister and author.
- Juan Cruz Martínez, 73, Mexican politician, deputy (1997–2000).
- Cees Dam, 93, Dutch architect (Stopera, Maastoren, De Zalmhaven).
- André de Muralt, 94, Swiss philosopher.
- Bernard Eliade, 87, French writer and teacher.
- Feng Yufang, 63, Chinese engineer and major general, member of the Chinese Academy of Engineering.
- Takao Fujii, 83, Japanese politician, minister of transport (1997–1998), heart attack.
- Ilsetraut Hadot, 97, French philosopher and historian.
- Magsud Mammadov, 96, Azerbaijani ballet dancer.
- Dave McGinnis, 74, American football player (TCU Horned Frogs) and coach (Arizona Cardinals).
- Henry Newton, 82, English footballer (Nottingham Forest, Derby County).
- Margret Nikolova, 97, Bulgarian pop singer.
- Edward Norman, 87, British historian.
- Roger Prinzen, 57, German football manager (Balzers, 1. FC Nürnberg).
- Julio Ricardo, 87, Argentine sports journalist.
- Bernard Roizman, 96, American scientist.
- Arthur Louis Schechter, 86, American politician, diplomat and attorney, ambassador to the Bahamas (1998–2001).
- Lyudmila Shevtsova, 91, Russian-Ukrainian runner, Olympic champion (1960).
- Drago Šoštarić, 83, Slovenian Olympic gymnast (1972).
- Donald K. Tarlton, 82, Canadian music producer and promoter.
- Rafael Tolosa, 67, Colombian racing cyclist (Café de Colombia).
- Gheorghe Urschi, 78, Moldovan actor, director, and comedian, complications from a stroke.
- Lee Wachtstetter, 97, American author.
- Jean Walkinshaw, 99, American television producer.
- Ian Watson, 82, British science fiction author (The Jonah Kit, Chekhov's Journey) and screenwriter (A.I. Artificial Intelligence).

=== 14 ===
- Neela Bhagwat, 83, Indian classical singer.
- Shlomo Breznitz, 89, Czechoslovak-born Israeli author and politician, MK (2006–2007). (death announced on this date)
- Steve Clark, 82, American swimmer, three-time Olympic champion (1964), complications from Parkinson's disease.
- Robert Cluck, 87, American politician, mayor of Arlington, Texas (2003–2015).
- Kazuo Ebisawa, 72–73, Japanese art director (Demon Slayer: Kimetsu no Yaiba, Fate/Zero, Akira).
- Paddy Embry, 83, Australian politician, member of the Western Australian Legislative Council (2001–2005).
- Jean-Pierre Escalettes, 90, French football administrator, president of the FFF (2005–2010).
- John Fitzgerald, 77, American football player (Dallas Cowboys).
- Sophie Flamand, 61, Belgian writer and journalist.
- Marc Galanter, 95, American academic.
- Sonia Gessner, 87, Swiss-Italian actress (The Great Beauty, Luna Nera, Le ragioni del cuore).
- Joy Harmon, 87, American actress (Cool Hand Luke, Village of the Giants, Angel in My Pocket), complications from pneumonia.
- James F. Howell, 91, American politician, member of the Oklahoma Senate (1970–1986).
- Richard Jowett, 88, English cricketer (Oxford University).
- David Kahler, 89, American architect and photographer.
- Jim Kanicki, 84, American football player (Cleveland Browns, New York Giants).
- Franklin F. Kuo, 91, Chinese-born American computer scientist and academic, co-developer of ALOHAnet.
- Ernest A. Larsen, 93, American politician.
- Arturo Lizón Giner, 87, Spanish politician, senator (1979–1993).
- Vicente Lucas, 90, Portuguese footballer (Belenenses, national team).
- Bernardin Mfumbusa, 64, Tanzanian Roman Catholic prelate, bishop of Kondoa (since 2011).
- Aleta Mitchell, 74, American actress (Ma Rainey's Black Bottom, Malcolm X, Midnight in the Garden of Good and Evil).
- Alexander Morton, 81, Scottish actor (Monarch of the Glen, Take the High Road, The Witcher 3: Wild Hunt), heart failure.
- Sue Prado, 44, Filipina actress (Oro, Barber's Tales, Manila Skies), cardiac arrest.
- Michael O. Rabin, 94, Israeli mathematician and computer scientist (Miller–Rabin primality test, Pumping lemma, Rabin cryptosystem).
- Raymond Riotte, 86, French road racing cyclist.
- Edmar de Salles, 97, Brazilian Olympic sport shooter.
- Francisco Sanjosé, 73, Spanish footballer (Sevilla FC), Olympic national team (1976).
- Mihály Sasvári, 93, Hungarian sprint canoeist. (death announced on this date)
- Ann Schein Carlyss, 86, American pianist.
- Ken Thorley, 75, American actor (Star Trek: The Next Generation, Men in Black, Curb Your Enthusiasm).
- Hans Wagner, 76, German Olympic bobsledder (1980).
- Dan Wall, 72, American jazz keyboardist.
- Wolfgang Zuckschwerdt, 76, German judoka.

=== 15 ===
- Peter Aldington, 93, British architect.
- Osvaldas Balakauskas, 88, Lithuanian classical composer, diplomat, and academic (Lithuanian Academy of Music and Theatre).
- Sir Peter Beale, 92, British Army lieutenant general, complications from surgery.
- Nelson Calzadilla, 71, Venezuelan Olympic boxer (1976).
- Barbara Carr, 85, American blues singer.
- Carolina Flores Gómez, 27, Mexican beauty queen, shot.
- Frosted, 13, American Thoroughbred racehorse, euthanized.
- Daniel Grataloup, 88, French-Swiss architect.
- Klaus Ihlenfeld, 92, German-born American artist.
- Kevin Klose, 85, American broadcast executive, president of NPR (1998–2008), complications from Alzheimer's disease.
- Mark Mobius, 89, American-born German fund manager.
- Lucha Moreno, 86, Mexican singer and actress (Asesinos, S.A., Quinceañera, Amor en silencio).
- Claire Murray, 83, American artist and crafts businesswoman.
- Ned, New Zealand sinistral snail.
- Ivan Rebernik, 86, Slovenian diplomat, chancellor of the Order of the Holy Sepulchre (2012–2016).
- Rico Rizzitelli, 64, French journalist (Libération, L'Équipe), complications from diabetes.
- Phil Rockefeller, 87, American politician, member of the Washington Senate (2005–2011).
- José Santamaría, 96, Uruguayan-Spanish football player (Uruguay national team, Spain national team) and manager (Spain national team).
- Hiroshi Shiono, 94, Japanese legal scholar and academic.
- Robert Skidelsky, Baron Skidelsky, 86, British historian (Keynes: The Return of the Master), economist (Money and Government) and life peer, member of the House of Lords (since 1991), brain infection.
- Pip Wedge, 97, British-born Canadian broadcaster.
- Lou Zocchi, 91, American gaming distributor and publisher.

=== 16 ===
- Garret Anderson, 53, American baseball player (Los Angeles Angels), World Series champion (2002), acute necrotizing pancreatitis.
- Laura Balbo, 92, Italian politician, minister for equal opportunities (1998–2000) and deputy (1983–1992).
- André Bernard, 90, French Olympic modern pentathlete (1960).
- Miguel Canto, 78, Mexican Hall of Fame boxer, WBC flyweight champion (1975–1979).
- Mark Carrington, 64, New Zealand cricketer (Northern Districts).
- Tony Clarke, Baron Clarke of Stone-cum-Ebony, 82, British lawyer, judge and life peer, member of the House of Lords (2009–2020).
- Barbara Flynn Currie, 85, American politician, member of the Illinois House of Representatives (1979–2019).
- Justin Fairfax, 47, American politician, lieutenant governor of Virginia (2018–2022), suicide by gunshot.
- Giorgos Gonios, 79, Greek footballer (Agios Ierotheos, Panathinaikos).
- Pharis Harvey, 91, American Methodist minister and human rights activist (Gwangju Uprising).
- James Hayward, 82, American abstract painter.
- Kazuo Imanishi, 85, Japanese football player (Toyo Industries, national team) and manager (Mazda), pneumonia.
- Jim Jabir, 63, American women's basketball coach (Dayton Flyers, Siena Saints, Marquette Golden Eagles), pancreatic cancer.
- Raza Kazim, 96, Pakistani philosopher and political activist.
- Andy Kershaw, 66, English broadcaster and radio DJ (BBC Radio 1), cancer.
- Billy Knight, 90, British tennis player.
- Craig Krampf, 80, American session drummer, songwriter ("Oh Sherrie") and producer.
- Leigh Magar, 57, American milliner, breast cancer.
- Oleg Maisenberg, 80, Ukrainian-born Austrian pianist.
- Alex Manninger, 48, Austrian footballer (Siena, Arsenal, national team), traffic collision.
- Robert McCallum Jr., 80, American diplomat.
- Noble Yeats, 10, Irish Thoroughbred racehorse, euthanasia.
- Jan Potměšil, 60, Czech actor (Why?, Princess Jasnenka and the Flying Shoemaker, Bony a klid).
- Narayana Ramachandran, 77, Indian sports administrator, president of World Squash (2008–2016) and the IOA (2014–2017).
- Frederick William Ratcliffe, 98, British librarian.
- John R. Reed, 88, American academic and writer.
- Alvaro Roca, 86, Uruguayan Olympic basketball player (1964).
- Don Schlitz, 73, American Hall of Fame songwriter ("The Gambler", "Forever and Ever, Amen", "When You Say Nothing at All").
- Dory Selinger, 54, American cyclist, Paralympic champion (1996), traffic collision.
- Kenneth Senne, 84, American electrical engineer.
- David Smith, 82, Australian politician, Western Australia MLA (1983–1996).
- Ernie Smith, 80, Jamaican reggae singer.
- Bradley R. Straatsma, 98, American ophthalmologist.
- Mamadou Sylla, 66, Guinean arms dealer.
- Seigō Tsuchida, 82, Japanese politician, mayor of Higashine (since 1998).

=== 17 ===
- Nathalie Baye, 77, French actress (Every Man for Himself, Strange Affair, Catch Me If You Can), complications from Lewy body dementia.
- Terry L. Bruce, 82, American politician, member of the U.S. House of Representatives (1985–1993).
- Dean Buntrock, 94, American waste service executive, co-founder of Waste Management, Inc.
- Ron Campbell, 90, English rugby league referee. (death announced on this date)
- Mariclare Costello, 90, American actress (Let's Scare Jessica to Death, Ordinary People, The Waltons).
- Beatriz de Moura, 86–87, Brazilian-born Spanish publisher and translator.
- Nadia Farès, 57, French actress (The Crimson Rivers, Dis-moi oui..., The Nest).
- Zenta Gastl-Kopp, 92, German Olympic hurdler (1956, 1960).
- Joaquim Granger, 97, Portuguese Olympic gymnast (1952).
- Michael Harrison, 67, American contemporary classical music composer and pianist.
- Karel Korytář, 76, Czech politician, MP (2006–2008), senator (1996–2002, 2008–2014).
- Jan Krámek, 80, Czech politician, MP (1993–1996), senator (1996–2000), mayor of Prague-Zbraslav (1990–1994).
- Bob Kevoian, 75, American radio presenter (The Bob & Tom Show), stomach cancer.
- Sergio Landucci, 88, Italian philosopher and historian of philosophy.
- Pierre Lefebvre, 87, French politician, senator (1997–2001).
- Tuimasi Manuca, 40, Fijian footballer (Ba, Hekari United, national team), lung and brain cancer.
- David McKinley, 79, American politician, member of the U.S. House of Representatives (2011–2023).
- Percy O'Driscoll, 91, Canadian Anglican prelate, bishop of Huron (1990–2000) and metropolitan of Ontario (1993–2000).
- Ian Pinard, 54, Dominican politician, MP (2005–2009, 2014–2016).
- Jacqueline Rayet, 92, French ballet dancer.
- Oscar Schmidt, 68, Brazilian Hall of Fame basketball player (JuveCaserta, Corinthians, national team).
- Jorge Enrique Serpa Pérez, 84, Cuban Roman Catholic prelate, bishop of Pinar del Río (2006–2019).
- Barry Seton, 89, Australian racing driver, Bathurst 500 winner (1965).
- Franz Stocker, 92, Austrian politician, federal councillor (1979–1983), MP (1983–1993).

=== 18 ===
- Atay Aktuğ, 81, Turkish footballer, sports executive, and politician, president of Trabzonspor (2003–2005).
- Txumari Alfaro, 73, Spanish naturopath and television presenter.
- Oscar Andrade, 68, Brazilian politician, deputy (1996–2003), traffic collision.
- Estelle Asmodelle, 61, Australian dancer.
- Sergio Cappelli, 75, Italian politician, senator (1992–1996).
- Stanton Davis, 80, American jazz trumpeter.
- Lynne Goldstein, 72, American archaeologist.
- Rif Hutton, 73, American actor (Doogie Howser, M.D., JAG, General Hospital), brain cancer.
- Lai Cheng-ying, 94, Taiwanese cinematographer (Beautiful Duckling, Execution in Autumn).
- Stefanos Linaios, 97, Greek actor (Dead Man's Treasure) and politician, MP (1989–1990).
- Gordon Livsey, 79, English footballer (Wrexham, Chester, Hartlepool United). (death announced on this date)
- Edoardo Lualdi Gabardi, 94, Italian racing driver.
- József Marosi, 91, Hungarian fencer, Olympic silver medallist (1956).
- Doug Martin, 68, American football player (Minnesota Vikings).
- David Mena, 73, Israeli politician and lawyer, MK (1992–1996, 2006).
- Balbir Punj, 76, Indian journalist (Hindustan Times, The Indian Express) and politician, MP (2000–2006, 2008–2014).
- Aldo Roy, 84, Canadian Olympic weightlifter (1968).
- Dean Schwarz, 88, American ceramic artist.
- John Seymour, 88, American politician, member of the U. S. Senate (1991–1992), mayor of Anaheim, California (1978–1982).
- Ghayasuddin Siddiqui, 86, Indian-born British academic and political activist.
- Heidi Stroh, 85, German actress.
- Wanlop Thaineua, 81, Thai politician, MP (2005–2006, 2007–2011).
- Van Hammer, 66, American professional wrestler (WCW).
- Wakana Yamazaki, 61, Japanese voice actress (Case Closed, Dead or Alive, Ninja Gaiden).

=== 19 ===
- George Ariyoshi, 100, American politician, lieutenant governor (1970–1974) and governor of Hawaii (1974–1986).
- Ben Bartlett, 61, British composer, lung cancer.
- Georges Benrekassa, 93–94, French historian and literary critic.
- Randall Bourscheidt, 81, American arts administrator, lung cancer.
- Adalberto Bravo, 61, Puerto Rican musician, prostate cancer.
- Max Byers, 86, Australian footballer (Essendon).
- Chems-Eddine Chitour, 81, Algerian academic and politician, minister of higher education and scientific research (2020).
- Karl O. Christe, 89, German-born American inorganic chemist.
- Dean Cooley, 92, American politician, member of the Arizona House of Representatives (1997–2003).
- Jill Curzon, 87, English actress (Daleks' Invasion Earth 2150 A.D., Hugh and I).
- Jan Donkers, 82, Dutch journalist and radio presenter (VPRO).
- Dominique Douay, 82, French science fiction author.
- Driss Guiga, 101, Tunisian politician, minister of the interior (1980–1984).
- Keith Jellum, 87, American artist.
- Geoffrey King, 82, British geophysicist.
- Aleksey Lelin, 48, Belarusian Olympic high jumper (2000).
- Dave Mason, 79, English Hall of Fame musician (Traffic) and songwriter ("Hole in My Shoe", "Feelin' Alright?").
- Desmond Morris, 98, English zoologist (The Naked Ape, The Human Zoo, The Human Animal), ethnologist and surrealist painter.
- Patrick Muldoon, 57, American actor (Days of Our Lives, Melrose Place, Starship Troopers) and film producer, heart attack.
- Helen Nakimuli, 40, Ugandan politician, MP (since 2021), complications from surgery.
- María Nieves, 91, Argentine tango dancer (Tango Argentino).
- George E. Nowotny, 93, American businessman and politician.
- Vuokko Nurmesniemi, 96, Finnish textile designer.
- Ester Pajusoo, 91, Estonian actress (A Young Retiree, Vana daami visiit, Kättemaksukontor).
- Oleksandr Polovkov, 46, Ukrainian footballer (Stal Alchevsk, Andijon, Zorya Luhansk), killed in action. (death announced on this date)
- Gerardo Renault, 96, Brazilian politician, Minas Gerais MLA (1968–1978), deputy (1978–1986).
- Gerhard Schmidt-Gaden, 88, German conductor, founder of the Tölzer Knabenchor.
- Mukhtar Shakhanov, 83, Kazakh poet and politician, MP (2004–2007).
- Phunchok Stobdan, 67, Indian diplomat, ambassador to Kyrgyzstan (2010–2012).
- Tim Thorn, 83, British air force officer, pilot and Olympic bobsledder (1968), oesophageal cancer.
- Viktor Zaidenberg, 76, Russian football manager (Dynamo Kirov, Khimik Dzerzhinsk, Nizhny Novgorod).

=== 20 ===
- Michel Bassompierre, 78, French sculptor, complications from a fall.
- Manfred Böckl, 77, German writer.
- Luis Brandoni, 86, Argentine actor (The Truce, State of Reality, Waiting for the Hearse) and politician, deputy (1997–2001), complications from a fall.
- Allan M. Collins, 88, American cognitive scientist.
- Kay Denman, 88, Australian politician, senator (1993–2005).
- Georgette Dorn, 91, Hungarian-born American academic.
- Piero Dotti, 86, Italian footballer (Messina, Lazio, Mirandolese).
- Thijs de Graauw, 84, Dutch astronomer.
- Rim Giniyatullin, 82, Uzbek politician, minister of land reclamation and water management (1989–1996).
- Ralph B. Guy Jr., 96, American jurist, judge of the U.S. District Court for the Eastern District of Michigan (1976–1985) and the U.S. Court of Appeals for the Sixth Circuit (since 1985).
- Julian Hunt, Baron Hunt of Chesterton, 84, British meteorologist and life peer, member of the House of Lords (2000–2021), vascular dementia.
- Lukas Mbadi Kaborang, 82, Indonesian civil servant and politician, Regent of East Sumba (1994–1999).
- Elisabeth Kirkby, 105, Australian actress (Number 96), politician and radio broadcaster, New South Wales MLC (1981–1998).
- Lawrence Korb, 86, American attorney, assistant secretary of defense (1981–1985).
- Li Daoyu, 93, Chinese diplomat, ambassador to the United States (1993–1998).
- Rod Martin, 72, American football player (Oakland / Los Angeles Raiders).
- Wayne Moss, 88, American session guitarist (Area Code 615, Barefoot Jerry) and songwriter.
- Rita Mulier, 91, Belgian feminist author and economist.
- Alan Osmond, 76, American musician (The Osmonds) and songwriter ("Down by the Lazy River", "Crazy Horses").
- Florian Schneeberger, 55, Austrian Olympic sailor (1996), traffic collision.
- Kyriakos Sfetsas, 80, Greek composer.
- Cynthia Shange, 76, South African model and actress (Muvhango).
- Malissa Sherwood, 50, American wrestler, cancer.
- Sergei Stadler, 63, Russian violinist and conductor.
- Adrienne Staples, 69, New Zealand politician, mayor of South Wairarapa (2004–2016) and member of the Greater Wellington Regional Council (since 2016).
- David Wilcock, 53, American paranormal writer and producer (Above Majestic), suicide by gunshot.
- Tony Worthington, 84, British politician, MP (1987–2005).
- Michael Yonkers, 78, American musician, complications from cancer.

=== 21 ===
- Monica Azuba Ntege, 70, Ugandan politician, minister of works and transport (2016–2019).
- Mariano Baptista Gumucio, 92, Bolivian politician and writer.
- Moogie Canazio, 70, Brazilian recording engineer, mixing engineer and record producer.
- Anthony Chivers, 89, British Olympic sport shooter (1964).
- Tadeusz Cichocki, 89, Polish histologist.
- Neil De Marchi, 86–87, Australian economist and historian. (death announced on this date)
- Robin Vanden-Bempde-Johnstone, 5th Baron Derwent, 95, British hereditary peer, member of the House of Lords (1986–1999).
- Hayat Al-Fahad, 78, Kuwaiti actress (Um Harun).
- Gregg Foreman, 53, American musician (The Delta 72).
- Lena Maria Gårdenäs, 79, Swedish singer and actress (Repmånad, ABBA: The Movie).
- Stuart D. Goldman, 83, American historian and author.
- Andrew Hacker, 96, American political scientist, stomach cancer.
- Norm Higgins, 89, American marathon runner.
- José Honório, 53, East Timorese politician, minister of higher education, science and culture (since 2023), heart attack.
- Elsie Kelly, 89, English actress (Benidorm, The Famous Five, Crossroads).
- Viktor Liashko, 90, Ukrainian politician, MP (1990–1994).
- Henry J. Mansell, 88, American Roman Catholic prelate, auxiliary bishop of New York (1992–1995), bishop of Buffalo (1995–2003) and archbishop of Hartford (2003–2013).
- Carlos Mella, 95, Spanish writer and politician.
- Jean-Benoît Meybeck, 53, French comic book author and illustrator.
- Ricardo de Pascual, 85, Mexican actor (El Chavo del Ocho, Senda de gloria, Camaleones).
- Gopalrao Patil, 94, Indian politician, MP (1994–2000).
- Prasert Prasarttong-Osoth, 93, Thai healthcare executive, founder of Bangkok Dusit Medical Services.
- Luis Puenzo, 80, Argentine film director and screenwriter (The Official Story), Oscar winner (1986).
- Hussein Mohammed Hadi Al-Sadr, 81, Iraqi politician.
- Paul Standidge, 92, New Zealand cricketer (Wellington).
- Gideon Tish, 86, Israeli footballer (Hapoel Tel Aviv, Hapoel Herzliya, national team).
- Barrie Tomlinson, 88, British comic book editor and writer (Roy of the Rovers, Speed, Wildcat).

=== 22 ===
- Eugene Braunwald, 96, Austrian-born American cardiologist.
- Peter J. Carroll, 72–73, British occultist and writer.
- Acharya Chandana, 89, Indian Jain nun.
- Stephen Dargan, 71, American politician.
- Edward J. Drea, 82, American military historian.
- Karina Duprez, 79, Mexican television director (Sueños y caramelos, Pasión, Sortilegio) and actress.
- Brian Edgerly, 82, American Olympic baseball player (1964).
- Dale Hoggins, 93, American politician, member of the Washington House of Representatives (1967–1975).
- Allan Hosie, 80, Scottish rugby union referee.
- Bill Ind, 84, English Anglican clergyman, bishop of Truro (1997–2008).
- Katsu Kanai, 89, Japanese film director, pneumonia.
- Amal Khalil, Lebanese journalist, airstrike.
- Mijo Kovačić, 89, Croatian painter.
- Manfred Kreuz, 90, German footballer (Schalke 04).
- Daniel L'Homond, 71, French storyteller and author.
- George Ley, 80, English footballer (Portsmouth, Dallas Tornado, Exeter City).
- Edward Lozzi, 77, American publicist.
- José Ulises Macías Salcedo, 85, Mexican Roman Catholic prelate, bishop of Mexicali (1984–1996) and archbishop of Hermosillo (1996–2016).
- David Malouf, 92, Australian poet and writer (Neighbours in a Thicket, The Great World, Remembering Babylon).
- Mike Ohnstad, 99, American politician, member of the Minnesota House of Representatives (1973–1974).
- Tony Parkes, 76, English football player (Buxton, Blackburn Rovers) and manager (Blackburn Rovers), complications from Alzheimer's disease.
- J. H. Prynne, 89, British poet.
- Paul Tawiah Quaye, 73, Ghanaian police officer, inspector general (2009–2013).
- N. Bhaskara Rao, 90, Indian politician, MP (1998–1999) and chief minister of Andhra Pradesh (1984).
- Kenneth Roman, 95, American advertising executive, chairman of Ogilvy (1985–1989).
- David Scott, 80, American politician, member of the U.S. House of Representatives (since 2003), Georgia Senate (1983–2003), and House of Representatives (1975–1983).
- Ruth Slenczynska, 101, American classical pianist.
- Murray Beauclerk, 14th Duke of St Albans, 87, British hereditary peer, member of the House of Lords (1988–1999).
- Dean Tavoularis, 93, American production designer (The Godfather, Apocalypse Now, Bonnie and Clyde), Oscar winner (1975).
- Michael Tilson Thomas, 81, American conductor, pianist and composer, glioblastoma.
- James Valentine, 64, Australian saxophonist (Models), radio presenter (ABC Radio Sydney), and television host (The Afternoon Show), assisted suicide.
- Surangel S. Whipps, 85, Palauan businessman and politician.
- Corky Withrow, 88, American baseball player (St. Louis Cardinals).

=== 23 ===
- Musa Akhmadov, 70, Russian playwright, poet and writer.
- Reg Austin, 91, Zimbabwean lawyer and academic.
- Jack Bass, 91, American author and journalist (The Charlotte Observer).
- Michael Beint, 100, English actor (Elizabeth, The Hi-Jackers, Adam Adamant Lives!).
- Claude Bessy, 93, French ballerina, director of the Paris Opera Ballet School (1972–2004).
- Jean Pierre Biyiti bi Essam, 76, Cameroonian politician and diplomat, ambassador to Israel (2018–2025).
- Nancy Cox, 77, American virologist, glioblastoma.
- HavinMotion, 22, American rapper, shot.
- Nicole Hollander, 86, American cartoonist (Sylvia).
- Peter Kramer, 93, German physicist.
- Cliff Lambert, 96, English rugby league player (Featherstone Rovers, Hunslet).
- Łukasz Litewka, 36, Polish sociologist and politician, MP (since 2023), traffic collision.
- Tajang Laing, 100, Malaysian Orang Ulu politician, member of the Cobbold Commission, Sarawak State Legislative Assembly (1979–1983).
- Ivan Livingstone, 96, Canadian football player (Calgary Stampeders, Montreal Alouettes, BC Lions).
- Sylvana Lorenz, 73, French art dealer and writer.
- Josh Mauro, 35, English-born American football player (Arizona Cardinals, New York Giants, Jacksonville Jaguars).
- Murray McBride, 90, Canadian politician.
- Aleksey Pimanov, 64, Russian television presenter, producer (Tankers) and film director (Eleven Silent Men), heart attack.
- Jean-Bernard Pommier, 81, French pianist and conductor.
- William J. Prior, 79, American philosopher.
- Rexhep Qosja, 89, Albanian writer and politician, representative to the Interim Administrative Council (1999–2002).
- Abdullah Rahi, 86–87, Pakistani footballer (Dhaka Mohammedan, Victoria SC, national team).
- Manfred T. Reetz, 82, German chemist and academic.
- Ellie Rodríguez, 79, Puerto Rican baseball player (Kansas City Royals, Milwaukee Brewers, California Angels).
- Richard P. Simmons, 94, American metallurgist, industrialist and philanthropist.
- Suresh Harilal Soni, 81, Indian social worker.
- Will Stanhope, 39, Canadian rock climber, fall.
- Jack R. Thornell, 86, American photographer, complications from kidney disease.
- Renzo Travanut, 80, Italian politician, president of Friuli-Venezia Giulia (1994).
- George Young, 88, American saxophonist.
- Quintin Young, 78, Scottish footballer (Rangers, Ayr United, East Fife).

=== 24 ===
- Josep Manuel Anglada, 92, Spanish mountaineer.
- Erich Arndt, 87, German table tennis player.
- Ghenadie Dudoglo, 39, Moldovan weightlifter.
- Michael Eneramo, 40, Nigerian footballer (Espérance Tunis, Sivasspor, national team), heart attack.
- Mary Grech, 88, Maltese television presenter (Malta Television) and actress.
- G. A. Hardaway, 71, American politician, member of the Tennessee House of Representatives (since 2007).
- George Herms, 90, American assemblage artist.
- Jean-Yves Hugon, 76, French politician, deputy (2002–2007).
- Gordon Ingate, 100, Australian Olympic sailor (1972).
- Busk Margit Jonsson, 96, Swedish operatic soprano singer.
- Dirk Kempthorne, 74, American politician, member of the U.S. Senate (1993–1999), governor of Idaho (1999–2006) and secretary of the interior (2006–2009), colon cancer.
- Włodzimierz Korohoda, 89, Polish cell biologist.
- Jade Kops, 19, Dutch social media influencer and activist, rhabdomyosarcoma.
- Valdis Ķuzis, 81, Latvian Olympic luger (1976).
- Gran Markus Jr., 72, Mexican wrestler (CMLL).
- Cristian Camilo Muñoz, 30, Colombian road racing cyclist, complications from a fall.
- Tommy Nuñez, 87, American basketball referee.
- Hirohiko Okano, 101, Japanese poet, heart failure.
- Günter Pichler, 85, Austrian violinist (Alban Berg Quartett), traffic collision.
- Rudolf Plyukfelder, 97, Russian weightlifter, Olympic champion (1964).
- Greet Prins, 72, Dutch politician, member of the Senate (2019–2025), complications from amyotrophic lateral sclerosis.
- Donald Riegle, 88, American politician, member of the U.S. House of Representatives (1967–1976) and U.S. Senate (1976–1995), cardiac arrest.
- Richard A. Robison, 93, American paleontologist.
- Benoît Rousseau, 66, Canadian actor (Octobre, Fred's Head, Assassin's Creed).
- Tatsuo Sato, 61, Japanese anime director (Cat Soup, Martian Successor Nadesico, Bodacious Space Pirates), liver failure.
- Christina Scherling, 85, Swedish Olympic speed skater (1960, 1964, 1968).
- Lev Shimelov, 96, Russian director and actor.
- Gurbux Singh, 84, Indian field hockey player, Olympic champion (1960) and bronze medalist (1968).
- Nancy Siraisi, 93, American medical historian and academic.
- Beau Starr, 81, American football player (Montreal Alouettes) and actor (Halloween, Goodfellas).
- Bill Swain, 85, American football player (New York Giants, Detroit Lions, Minnesota Vikings), complications from dementia.
- Tony Wilson, 89, Trinidadian musician (Hot Chocolate) and songwriter ("Brother Louie", "You Sexy Thing").
- Zofia Zdybicka, 97, Polish Roman Catholic nun and philosopher.

=== 25 ===
- Gérard Biguet, 79, French football referee.
- Liam Browne, 89, Irish racehorse trainer.
- Sadio Camara, 47, Malian military officer and politician, minister of defence (since 2020), car bombing.
- James E. Carnes, 84, American politician, member of the Ohio Senate (1995–2004).
- Liz Conmy, 67, American politician, member of the North Dakota House of Representatives (since 2022), plane crash.
- Matt DeCaro, 70, American actor (Prison Break, Richie Rich, U.S. Marshals), heart failure.
- Richard Henderson, 97, American politician, member of the Hawaii Senate (1971–1978, 1981–1987).
- Marilyn Hickey, 94, American minister and televangelist.
- Daniel Huck, 78, French jazz reedist and singer.
- Dick Kimball, 91, American Hall of Fame diver and diving coach.
- Abbe Lane, 93, American actress (Oh, Captain!, My Friend, Dr. Jekyll, Twilight Zone: The Movie) and singer.
- Annette Macarthur-Onslow, 93, Australian illustrator (Nordy Bank, Pastures of the Blue Crane) and author.
- Katsumi Miyaji, 85, Japanese rugby union player (Sanyo Electric, national team) and coach (national team).
- Andrzej Olechowski, 78, Polish politician, minister of finance (1992) and foreign affairs (1993–1995).
- Beng Chin Ooi, 65, Singaporean computer scientist.
- Jaan Puhvel, 94, Estonian-American linguist.
- Mircea Răceanu, 90, Romanian-born American diplomat and political dissident.
- Peter H. Raven, 89, American botanist and environmentalist.
- Rossana Reguillo, 70, Mexican sociologist.
- Jarvis Rockwell, 94, American visual artist, stroke.
- Carol Rumens, 81, British poet, brain tumour.
- Heidi Sørensen, 56, Danish-Norwegian politician, MP (2001–2007, 2012–2013), cancer.
- Jesper Thilo, 84, Danish jazz saxophonist.
- George C. Tiao, 92, Taiwanese-American econometrician and statistician, editor of Statistica Sinica (1991–1993).
- Christian Verrier, 73, French footballer (LB Châteauroux).
- Bill Wise, 61, American actor (SubUrbia, Boyhood, iZombie).

=== 26 ===
- Dion Anderson, 87, American actor (The Shawshank Redemption, Days of Our Lives, Townies).
- Adolfo Aristarain, 82, Argentine film director (Martín (Hache), Time for Revenge, Common Ground).
- Monte Coleman, 68, American football player (Washington Redskins) and coach (Arkansas–Pine Bluff Golden Lions).
- Gerry Conway, 73, American comic book writer (The Amazing Spider-Man, Punisher, Justice League), pancreatic cancer.
- Jesse Crenshaw, 79, American politician, member of the Kentucky House of Representatives (1993–2015).
- Erroll Davis, 81, American politician, member of the Pennsylvania House of Representatives (1971–1972), primary lateral sclerosis.
- Ruby Duncan, 93, American welfare rights activist.
- Nigel Dunnett, 63, British horticulturalist and academic, cancer.
- Jim Bob Floyd, 96, American concert pianist.
- Thomas Gayford, 97, Canadian equestrian, Olympic champion (1968).
- Vladimir Grachev, 84, Russian scientist and politician.
- Peter Gülke, 91, German conductor and musicologist.
- Edith Hillinger, 92, American artist.
- Sam Hunt, 83, American politician and educator, member of the Washington Senate (2017–2025) and House of Representatives (2001–2017).
- Luis Isaac, 79, Puerto Rican baseball player and coach (Cleveland Indians).
- Y. Karunadasa, 92, Sri Lankan Buddhist scholar.
- Michael Keating, 79, English actor (Blake's 7, EastEnders, Doctor Who).
- David Klahr, 86, American psychologist.
- Guy Leleu, 76, French racing cyclist.
- Francisco Letamendia, 82, Spanish Basque politician and lawyer (Burgos trials), member of the Congress of Deputies (1977–1978, 1979–1982).
- Dick Matena, 83, Dutch comics writer (Storm) and cartoonist (Tom Puss, Panda).
- Golam Sarwar Milon, 68, Bangladeshi politician, MP (1986–1990).
- Peter Morris, 93, Australian politician, MP (1972–1998) and minister of transport (1983–1987).
- Raghu Rai, 83, Indian photographer, cancer.
- Philip L. Roe, 87, English dynamicist.
- Alfred Slote, 99, American children's author.
- Nedra Talley, 80, American Hall of Fame singer (The Ronettes).
- Erik Thorbecke, 97, American economist.

=== 27 ===
- Maya Belenkaya, 94, Russian figure skater.
- Mimi Coertse, 93, South African soprano.
- Jacques Cornu, 72, Swiss Grand Prix motorcycle racer.
- Donal Counihan, 84, Irish politician, lord mayor of Cork (2007–2008).
- Leigh Crawford, 80, Australian footballer (Geelong).
- Matt Davidson, 48, Canadian ice hockey player (Columbus Blue Jackets).
- Edith Eger, 98, Hungarian-American psychologist and author.
- John E. Franz, 96, American chemist.
- Zelda F. Gamson, 90, American sociologist, pancreatic cancer.
- John Garrett, 74, Canadian ice hockey player (Hartford Whalers, Vancouver Canucks, Quebec Nordiques) and commentator.
- Jerry.K, 42, South Korean rapper, glioblastoma.
- Bharat Kapoor, 80, Indian actor (Sone Pe Suhaaga, Balidaan, Meenaxi: Tale of Three Cities).
- Abu Kasenally, 84, Mauritian politician, MP (2005–2014).
- Oby Kechere, Nigerian actress and film director.
- Ruth Lynden-Bell, 88, British chemist.
- Beverley Martyn, 79, English singer-songwriter.
- Steve Maslow, 81, American sound engineer (The Empire Strikes Back, Raiders of the Lost Ark, Speed), Oscar winner (1981, 1982, 1995), cancer.
- Raúl Mazerati, 68, Argentine Olympic rower (1972).
- Luciana Novaes, 42, Brazilian social worker and politician, member of the Municipal Chamber of Rio de Janeiro (2017–2020, 2023–2026), cerebral aneurysm.
- Dame Bridget Ogilvie, 88, Australian-British scientist.
- Aleksander Papiewski, 86, Polish football manager (Śląsk Wrocław).
- Daniele Roscia, 72, Italian politician, deputy (1994–2001).
- Doc Sauers, 96, American basketball coach (Albany Great Danes).
- Ferenc Sebő, 79, Hungarian folklorist.
- Len Strazewski, 71, American comic book writer (Starman, The Flash, Justice Society of America).
- Brian Wilkinson, 88, Australian Olympic swimmer (1956).

=== 28 ===
- Mike Andrews, 80, Australian footballer (Fitzroy).
- Enayatollah Atashi, 81, Iranian basketball coach (national team) and commentator.
- Vasko Boev, 37, Bulgarian footballer (Spartak Varna, Kaliakra Kavarna, Dobrudzha Dobrich).
- Conrad Cardinal, 84, American baseball player (Houston Colt .45's).
- Damien Christensen, 62, Australian footballer (Geelong).
- Juliet Daniel, 61, Barbadian-Canadian cancer biologist, breast cancer.
- George Dunn, 103, British air force officer.
- Ittai Gradel, 61, Israeli-born Danish antiques dealer, renal cancer.
- Bill Grayden, 105, Australian politician, MP (1949–1954) and Western Australian MLA (1947–1949, 1956–1993).
- Ján Kerekréti, 82, Slovak politician, MNC (2020–2023).
- Kiyoshi Kitagawa, 67, Japanese-American jazz double bassist.
- Dan McLean, 78, Canadian journalist and news anchor (CHCH-TV).
- Moncho Monsalve, 81, Spanish basketball player (Real Madrid, CB Girona) and coach (Brazil national team).
- Helge Mortensen, 84, Danish politician, minister of transport (1993–1994), member of the Folketing (1984–2005).
- Richard Neutze, 56, New Zealand biophysicist.
- Denys Overholser, 86, American electrical engineer and stealth technology specialist.
- Ange Édouard Poungui, 84, Congolese politician, prime minister (1984–1989) and vice president (1972–1973).
- Silvano Raia, 95, Brazilian liver surgeon.
- Brent Robbins, 55, American psychologist and academic.
- Petra Ruhrmann, 75, German Olympic figure skater (1968).
- Depinder Singh, 96, Indian army lieutenant general, commander of the IPKF (1987–1990).
- Adrian Smith, 89, American basketball player (Cincinnati Royals, San Francisco Warriors), Olympic champion (1960).
- Roger Sweet, 91, American toy designer (Mattel), creator of He-Man, complications from dementia.
- Murad Taqqu, 84, Iraqi-born American mathematician.
- Barbara Viera, 85, American volleyball coach (Delaware Fightin' Blue Hens).

=== 29 ===
- Heydar Abbasi, 83, Iranian poet.
- Geoff Ablett, 71, Australian footballer (Hawthorn, Richmond, St Kilda), complications from amyotrophic lateral sclerosis.
- Stephen Adamini, 81, American politician, member of the Michigan House of Representatives (2001–2006).
- Vidal Ashkenazi, 92, Turkish-born British geodesist.
- Bai Jingfu, 80, Chinese politician.
- Merle Bettenhausen, 82, American racing driver, complications from a stroke.
- David Allan Coe, 86, American country singer ("You Never Even Called Me By My Name", "The Ride") and songwriter ("Take This Job and Shove It").
- Yair Garbuz, 80, Israeli visual artist, writer and opinion journalist.
- Sirisumana Godage, 90, Sri Lankan book publisher.
- Lutz Goepel, 83, German politician, MEP (1994–2009).
- Frances Granger, 80, New Zealand netball player and coach.
- Volker Hage, 76, German journalist (Der Spiegel), author and literary critic.
- Richard Harries, Baron Harries of Pentregarth, 89, British Anglican clergyman and life peer, bishop of Oxford (1987–2006) and member of the House of Lords (since 2006).
- Donald MacRae, 84, Scottish folk singer.
- Claire Nielson, 89, Scottish actress (Fawlty Towers, Ghost Squad, Scotch and Wry).
- Oskar Petr, 73, Czech composer, lyricist, and singer.
- Eddy Pratomo, 72, Indonesian diplomat and law scholar.
- Savino Rebek, 85, Italian Olympic rower (1960).
- Brenda Reid, 80, American singer (The Exciters).
- Tony Ridley, 92, British civil engineer and academic. (death announced on this date)
- Eric Robertson, 62, American politician, member of the Washington House of Representatives (1995–1998, 2021–2025).
- Brian Sampson, 80, New Zealand rugby union player (Mid Canterbury) and cricketer (Canterbury).
- Aiko Satō, 102, Japanese author.
- Marguerite Shuster, 78, American academic.
- Gordon Snell, 93, British children's author.
- Carla van Zon, 74, New Zealand artistic director, kidney disease.
- J. Craig Venter, 79, American genomics researcher, founder of Celera Corporation and JCVI, complications from cancer.
- Vladimir Voevodin, 63, Russian computer scientist.
- Robyn Woodhouse, 82, Australian Olympic high jumper (1964).

=== 30 ===
- Stewart Baker, 78, American lawyer and politician.
- Georg Baselitz, 88, German-Austrian painter and sculptor.
- Art Becker, 84, American basketball player (Houston Mavericks, Indiana Pacers, Denver Rockets).
- Seymour Bernstein, 99, American pianist and composer.
- Antoinette Bower, 93, British-American actress (The Twilight Zone, Murder, She Wrote, Superbeast).
- Barry Christian, 54, American politician, suicide.
- David Daker, 90, English actor (Boon, Z Cars, Time Bandits).
- Peter L. P. Dillon, 92, American physicist and inventor.
- Ryan Edwards, 84, American operatic baritone.
- Gwen Farrell, 93, American actress (M*A*S*H) and boxing referee.
- Paul A. Fleury, 86, American physicist and academic administrator.
- Madeleine Gagnon, 87, Canadian writer and literary critic.
- Clarke Hansen, 84, Australian radio broadcaster (ABC).
- James Ernest Hitchcock, 70, American convicted murderer, execution by lethal injection.
- Ladislav Jindra, 104, Czech-born American World War II veteran.
- Kumanjayi Little Baby, 5, Australian Aboriginal child, homicide. (body discovered on this date)
- James Langdon Jr., 88, American politician, member of the North Carolina House of Representatives (2005–2017).
- Pirkko-Liisa Lehtosalo-Hilander, 91, Finnish archaeologist.
- Alex Ligertwood, 79, Scottish musician and singer (Santana).
- Gary Lydon, 61, Irish actor (The Banshees of Inisherin, The Clinic, War Horse).
- Milia Maroun, Lebanese fashion designer.
- Maria Menado, 94, Malaysian actress (Pontianak, Singapore) and model.
- Abdollah Movahed, 86, Iranian wrestler, Olympic champion (1968), heart attack.
- Bobby Murray, 72, American blues musician, songwriter and producer.
- Chantal Nobel, 77, French actress (Châteauvallon, The Black Hand).
- Fernando Novais, 92, Brazilian historian, researcher and writer.
- Richard M. Thomson, 92, Canadian banker.
- Georg Wadenius, 80, Swedish guitarist (Blood, Sweat & Tears, Saturday Night Live Band).
- Karl Zinsmeister, 67, American writer and consultant, director of the White House Domestic Policy Council (2006–2009).
