= Bae Myeong-in =

South Korean politician (1932–2026)

- 배명인

Minister of Justice
- In office 24 June 1982 – 18 February 1985
- President: Chun Doo-hwan
- Preceded by: Jeong Chi-geun
- Succeeded by: Kim Seok-hui

Personal details
- Born: 8 November 1932 Changwon, Korea, Empire of Japan
- Died: 6 April 2026 (aged 93)
- Education: Seoul National University (LLB); Yonsei University (MBA)
- Occupation: Lawyer

Bae Myeong-in (Korean: 배명인; 8 November 1932 – 6 April 2026) was a South Korean politician. He served as Minister of Justice from 1982 to 1985.

Bae died on 6 April 2026, at the age of 93.
