= Jacqueline Rayet =

French ballet dancer (1933–2026)

- Jacqueline Rayet in Pétrouchka (Paris, 1964)
- Born: 26 June 1933; Paris, France
- Died: 17 April 2026 (aged 92); Paris, France
- Education: Paris Opera Ballet School
- Occupation: Ballet dancer

Jacqueline Rayet (French: [ʒaklˈin ʁɛjˈɛ]; 26 June 1933 – 17 April 2026) was a French ballet dancer.

A Paris native, Rayet attended the Paris Opera Ballet School. She danced with Peter Van Dijk at the premiere of La Symphonie inachevée. She also gained renown from her appearance in Maurice Béjart ballets such as The Rite of Spring and Werbern opus 5.

Rayet died in Paris on 17 April 2026, at the age of 92.

== Decorations ==
- Officer of the Legion of Honour (1998)
