= Stuart D. Goldman =

American historian and author

- Born: January 26, 1943; New York City, U.S.
- Died: April 21, 2026 (aged 83)
- Education: Georgetown University; National War College
- Occupations: Author and Historian
- Writing career
- Subject: World War II

Stuart Douglas Goldman (January 26, 1943 – April 21, 2026) was an American historian and author specializing in Russian and Soviet political and military affairs and modern military history. He was a longtime specialist at the Congressional Research Service (CRS) and the author of Nomonhan, 1939: The Red Army's Victory That Shaped World War II, a study of the Soviet–Japanese conflict at Nomonhan (Khalkhin Gol). He also wrote numerous articles for World War II magazine.

== Early life and education ==
Goldman was born in New York City on January 26, 1943, and spent the first 21 years of his life in Brooklyn. He attended Erasmus Hall High School and earned a bachelor's degree in history from Brooklyn College.

He subsequently earned a master's degree from Colgate University and a PhD from Georgetown University. His doctoral dissertation, The Forgotten War: The Soviet Union and Japan, 1937–1939, examined Soviet–Japanese relations and military conflict during the years preceding World War II. His research on Soviet–Japanese conflict led to a one-year postdoctoral research fellowship in Tokyo.

Goldman later spent a year at the National War College, where he earned a master's degree in national security strategy.

== Career ==
Goldman taught history at Wilson College from 1969 to 1971 and Pennsylvania State University between 1971 and 1978. He then became a specialist in Russian and Eurasian political and military affairs at the Congressional Research Service of the Library of Congress, where he worked for 30 years. During that time, he wrote hundreds of analytical memoranda for Congressional Committees and Members and published scores of CRS reports.

Goldman was a scholar in residence at the National Council for Eurasian and East European Research following his retirement from CRS in 2009.

== Personal life ==
Goldman was married to Marilyn Gavrin, with whom he had two children. He died on April 21, 2026, at the age of 83.
