= Feng Yufang =

Chinese engineer and military general (1963–2026)

- 冯煜芳
- Born: 29 January 1963; Yuyao, Zhejiang, China
- Died: 13 April 2026 (aged 63)
- Education: National University of Defense Technology
- Scientific career
- Fields: Missile warhead technology
- Workplaces: People's Liberation Army Rocket Force Research Institute

Chinese name
- Simplified Chinese: 冯煜芳
- Traditional Chinese: 馮煜芳
Transcriptions
Standard Mandarin
- Hanyu Pinyin: Féng Yùfāng

Feng Yufang (29 January 1963 – 13 April 2026) was a Chinese engineer, a major general (shaojiang) of the People's Liberation Army (PLA), and an academician of the Chinese Academy of Engineering.

== Life and career ==
Feng was born in Yuyao, Zhejiang, on 29 January 1963. After graduating from Yuyao High School in 1979, he was admitted to National University of Defense Technology, where he majored in the Department of Applied Physics. He joined the Communist Party in September 1985. After university in 1987, he enlisted in the People's Liberation Army and was despatched to the Fourth Research Institute of the Second Artillery Corps. In December 2003, he moved to the Second Research Institute of the Second Artillery Equipment Research Institute, where he was promoted to its director in December 2013. He attained the rank of major general (shaojiang) in July 2006. In 2007, he was transferred to the Warhead and Warhead Technical Professional Group of the People's Liberation Army General Armaments Department and appointed group leader. In January 2016, he joined the newly founded People's Liberation Army Rocket Force Research Institute. In March 2018, he became a member of the 13th National Committee of the Chinese People's Political Consultative Conference.

Feng died on 13 April 2026, at the age of 63.

== Honours and awards ==
- 1999 State Science and Technology Progress Award for study on the influence of nuclear power
- 2004 State Science and Technology Progress Award for comprehensive evaluation system of warhead defense effect
- 2006 State Science and Technology Progress Award for development demonstration and evaluation of strategic warhead equipment
- 2008 State Science and Technology Progress Award for cruise missile weapon system
- 2009 State Science and Technology Progress Award for conventional missile multi warhead equipment technology
- 2011 State Technological Invention Award for the key technologies and methods to improve the detonation accuracy of nuclear warhead fuze
- November 27, 2017 Member of the Chinese Academy of Engineering (CAE)
