= Jeong Chi-geun =

South Korean politician (1931–2026)

- 정치근

Minister of Justice
- In office 21 May 1982 – 23 June 1982
- Preceded by: Lee Jong-won
- Succeeded by: Bae Myung-in

Personal details
- Born: 30 June 1931
- Died: 11 March 2026 (aged 94)
- Education: Seoul National University
- Occupation: Prosecutor

Jeong Chi-geun (Korean: 정치근; 30 June 1931 – 11 March 2026) was a South Korean politician. He served as Minister of Justice from May to June 1982.

Jeong died on 11 March 2026.
