= Jan Donkers =

Dutch journalist, radio presenter and writer (1943–2026)

- Born: Johannes Mattheus Donkers; 15 June 1943; Amsterdam, German-occupied Netherlands
- Died: 19 April 2026 (aged 82); Amsterdam, Netherlands
- Other name: Gonzo
- Education: University of Amsterdam
- Occupations: Journalist, radio presenter, writer
- Known for: Pop music journalism and radio programmes for VPRO

Jan Donkers (15 June 1943 – 19 April 2026) was a Dutch journalist, radio presenter and writer who became known for his long association with VPRO.

== Life and career ==
Donkers was born in Amsterdam and grew up in Amsterdam-Noord. He studied sociology at the University of Amsterdam and served on the editorial staff of Propria Cures between 1965 and 1966.

In the 1960s, Donkers worked as a pop music critic for de Volkskrant and an editor of the underground weekly Aloha/Hitweek. In that period, he interviewed musicians such as Frank Zappa, John Lennon and Janis Joplin. At VPRO, together with Wim Noordhoek, he helped launch De Joe Blow Show, and later presented programmes such as Gonzo Radio, Gonzo's Last Stand and Gonzo's Return. His nickname "Gonzo" referred to the style of gonzo journalism associated with Hunter S. Thompson.

As an author, Donkers made his prose debut with Opgeruimde verhalen in 1973. From 1974, he was a co-editor of De Revisor. His books included Amerika, Amerika (1982) and the novel Donkeyville USA (1994). He also wrote Zo dicht bij Amsterdam, a journalistic book about Amsterdam-Noord, and translated work by F. Scott Fitzgerald. He also contributed to publications including De Groene Amsterdammer, Haagse Post and Nieuwe Revu.

Later in his career, Donkers recorded more than 100 audiobooks. He continued broadcasting into his eighties; after leaving VPRO, his final radio programme was Gonzo's Return on NH Gooi.
