= Julio Ricardo =

Argentine sports journalist (1939–2026)

Julio Ricardo López Batista (18 August 1939 – 13 April 2026), best known as Julio Ricardo, was an Argentine sports journalist. He died on 13 April 2026, at the age of 87.
