= Jan Williams (actress) =

English actress (1939–2026)

- Born: 1939
- Died: 10 April 2026 (aged 87)
- Occupation: Actress

Jan Williams (1939 – 10 April 2026) was an English actress.

== Life and career ==
Williams is known for her roles in From Russia with Love (1963), Man in a Suitcase (1967), and the 1966 Doctor Who serial The Ark.

Williams died on 10 April 2026, aged 87.
