= Tadeusz Cichocki =

Polish histologist (1936–2026)

- Born: 1936; Będzin, Poland
- Died: 21 April 2026 (aged 89)
- Citizenship: Polish
- Education: Medical Academy in Kraków
- Occupation: Histologist
- Employer(s): Medical Academy in Kraków, Jagiellonian University Medical College

Tadeusz Cichocki (1936 – 21 April 2026) was a Polish histologist who was rector of the Medical Academy in Kraków from 1987 until 1990.

In 1960 he graduated from the Medical Academy in Kraków. Cichocki was the head of the Department of Histology of the Medical Academy in Kraków from 1971 to 2007. He was a member of the International Board of Morphological Sciences. He supervised two doctoral dissertations. Cichocki died on 21 April 2026, at the age of 89.

== Awards ==
- Odznaka honorowa "Za wzorową pracę w służbie zdrowia”
- Medal of the Commission of National Education
- Pro Arte Docendi Award
- Knight's Cross of Polonia Restituta
- Gold Cross of Merit
- Honoris Gratia Badge (2017)
- "Zasłużony dla Uniwersytetu Jagiellońskiego” Badge (2018)
