= Reg Austin =

Zimbabwean lawyer and academic (1935–2026)

- Born: Reginald Henry Fulbrooke Austin; 18 April 1935; Johannesburg, South Africa
- Died: 23 April 2026 (aged 91)

Academic background
- Education: University of Cape Town

Reginald Henry Fulbrooke Austin (18 April 1935 – 23 April 2026) was a Zimbabwean lawyer and academic.

== Life and career ==
Reginald Henry Fulbrooke Austin was born on 18 April 1935 in Johannesburg, South Africa to Gwendolyn Austin (née Wassman), an accountant, and Reginald Austin, a miner.

Austin died on 23 April 2026, at the age of 91.
