= Sharon Hawke =

Maori activist (1962–2026)

Sharon Hawke (1962 – 10 April 2026) was a Māori activist, community leader, film and TV camera operator and television producer from Auckland, New Zealand.

She was born in Tāmaki Makaurau. She was the second child of Joe Hawke and Rene Hawke. She did her schooling at Clevedon Primary School. She had two brothers, Parata Terrence Mario, the elder one, and Lance Joseph.

She was involved in advocacy tied to Takaparawhau Bastion Point and Ngāti Whātua Ōrākei. In 1999, she produced "Bastion Point - The Untold Story", a documentary which details the history of Bastion Point, Takaparawhau and the land rights of Māori. She also produced and edited a commemoration book on Bastion Point in May 2023 to mark 45 years of the Bastion Point occupation.

Hawke died on 10 April 2026 at the age of 64.
