= Arturo Lizón Giner =

Spanish politician (1938–2026)

Member of the Senate of Spain for Alicante
- In office 1 March 1979 – 13 April 1993

Personal details
- Born: 24 August 1938 Sella, Spain
- Died: 14 April 2026 (aged 87) Mutxamel, Spain
- Party: PSOE
- Education: University of Valencia
- Occupation: Lawyer

Arturo Lizón Giner (24 August 1938 – 14 April 2026) was a Spanish politician. A member of the Spanish Socialist Workers' Party, he served in the Senate from 1979 to 1993.

Lizón died in Mutxamel on 14 April 2026, at the age of 87.
