= Max Byers =

Australian rules footballer (1939–2026)

Personal information
- Full name: Maxwell William Byers
- Born: 29 December 1939
- Died: 19 April 2026 (aged 86)
- Original team: Hobart
- Height: 183 cm (6 ft 0 in)
- Weight: 79 kg (174 lb)
- Position: Utility

Playing career
Years	Club	Games (Goals)
1962–1963	Essendon	7 (0)

Maxwell William Byers (29 December 1939 – 19 April 2026) was an Australian rules footballer who played with Essendon in the Victorian Football League (VFL). He was an emergency for Essendon's 1962 premiership side. Byers was later captain-coach of country side, Numurkah.
