= Ramon Gieling =

Dutch filmmaker and author (1954–2026)

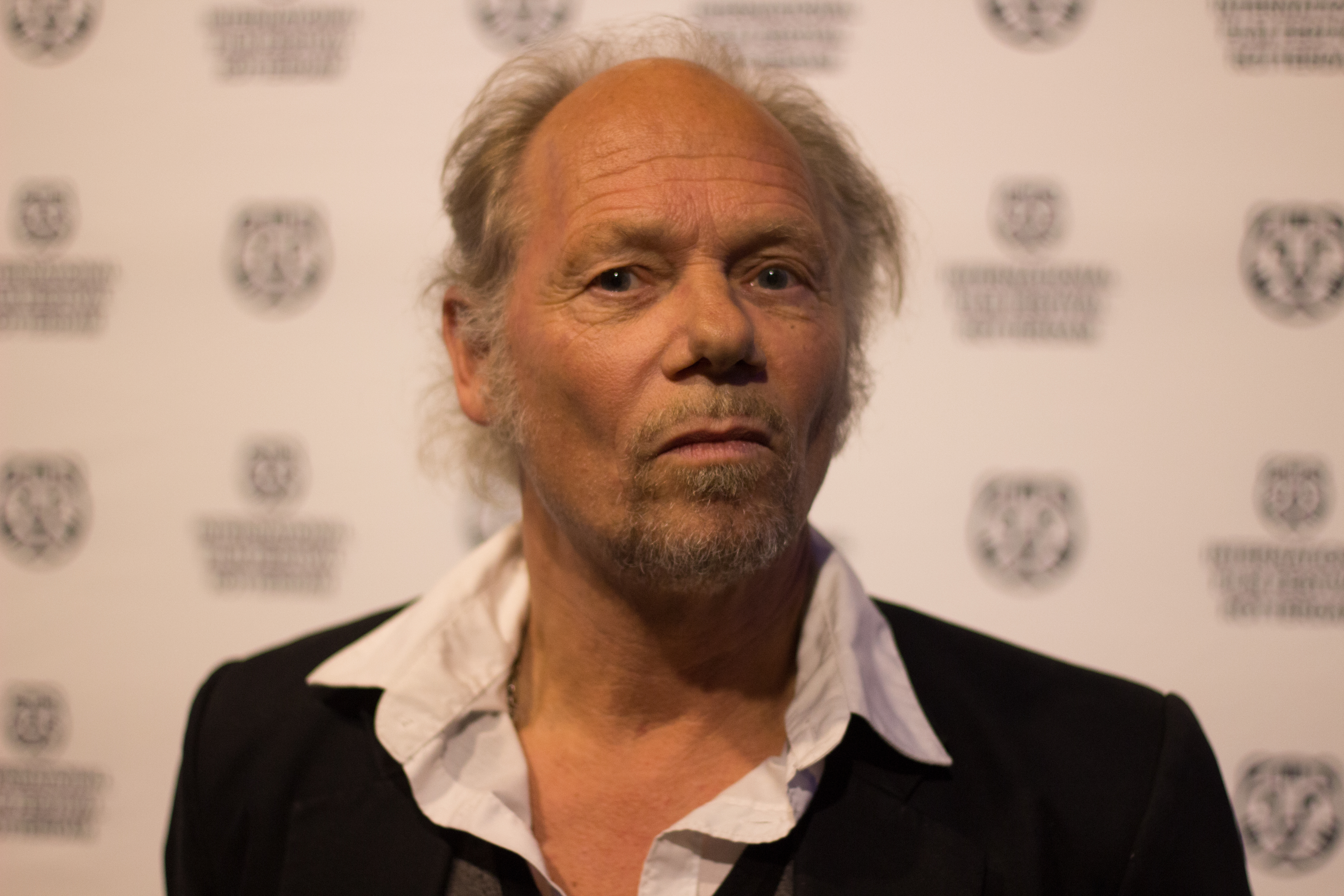
- Gieling in 2015
- Born: 21 April 1954; Utrecht, Netherlands
- Died: 5 April 2026 (aged 71)
- Education: ArtEZ Arnhem
- Occupations: Film director Screenwriter; Author

Ramon Gieling (21 April 1954 – 5 April 2026) was a Dutch film director, screenwriter and author. He notably received a Crystal Film award in 2015 for Erbarme dich.

Gieling died on 5 April 2026, at the age of 71.

== Selected filmography ==
- Johan Cruijff: En un momento dado (2004)
- Tramontana (2009)
- Over Canto (2011)

== Books ==
- Het ondankbare verleden van Santiago Herrero (2010)
- De hoofdletter pijn (2011)
