= Suresh Harilal Soni =

Indian social worker (1944–2026)

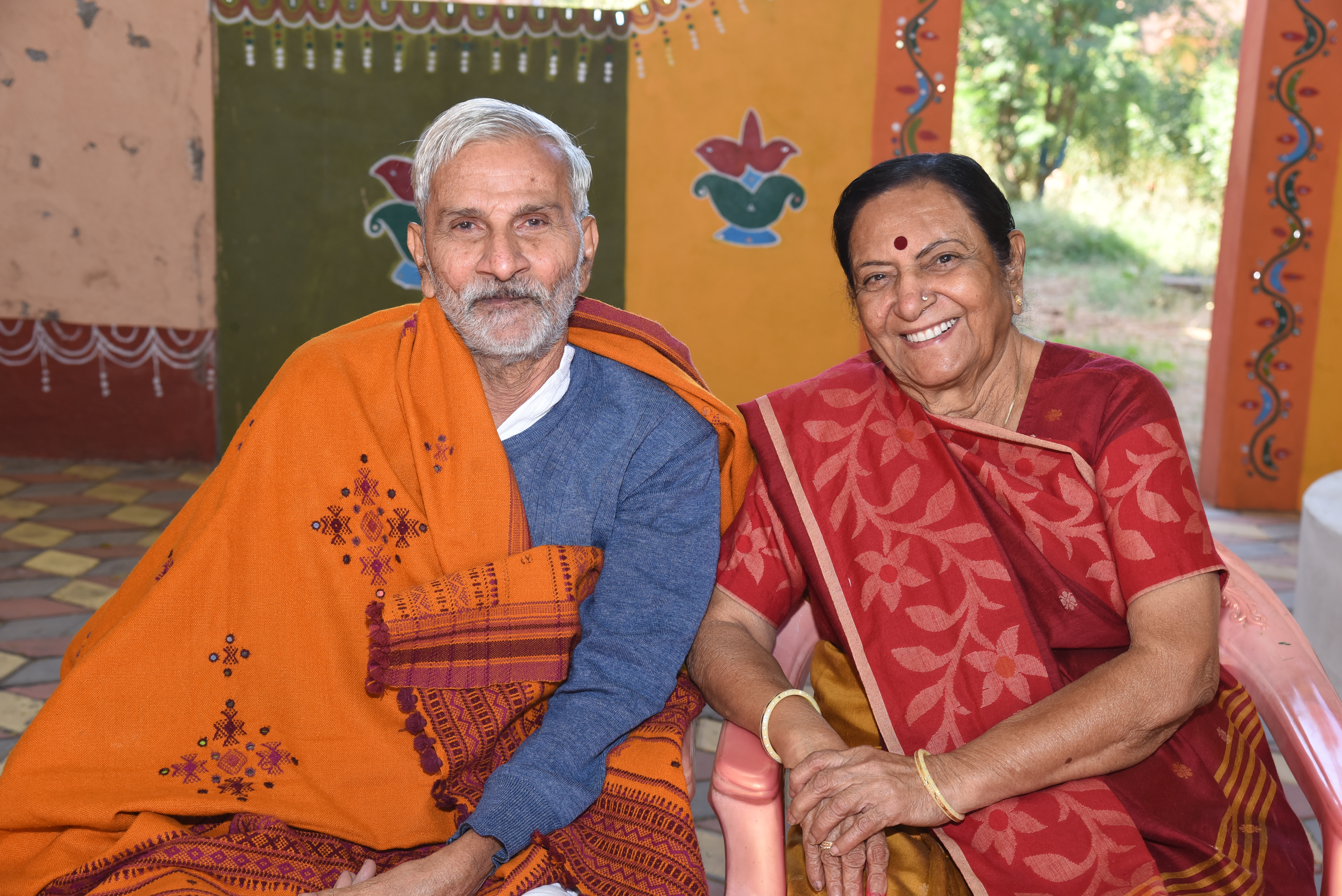
- Soni with his wife Indira in 2024
- Born: 23 November 1944; Sinor, Baroda State, India
- Died: 23 April 2026 (aged 81); Sahyog, Sabarkantha district, Gujarat, India
- Other name: Sabarkanthano Sahayojak
- Occupations: Social worker; Social activist
- Spouse: Indira Soni
- Children: Dipak Soni, Parul
- Honours: Padma Shri (2025)
- Website: https://www.sahyogtrust.org.in/

Suresh Harilal Soni (23 November 1944 – 23 April 2026) was an Indian social worker who worked for the welfare and rehabilitation of leprosy patients and intellectually disabled people. The Government of India conferred Padma Shri award in 2025 to Soni in recognition of his social works.

== Background ==
Soni completed Masters of Science with a First Class from M. S. University, Vadodara. He did not want to live his life as a Maths teacher. He used to stay with the leprosy affected at Shram Mandir trust for the entire day. In the year 1988, to help and give support to the affected, he founded Sahyog trust.

He was called Sabarkantha no Sahyojak (co-founder of Sabarkantha District). Soni was assisted by his wife, Indira Soni, in his work. Before marrying he informed her of his plans to serve the needy through a letter with 17 conditions. They had two children, Dipak and Parul.

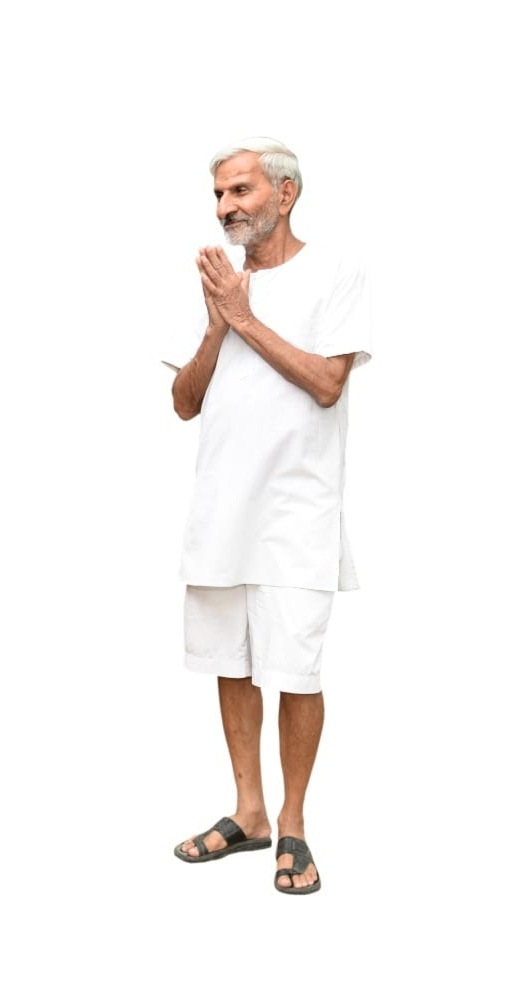

It was noted that he hardly ever left Ashram.

Soni died on 23 April 2026, at the age of 81.

== Work ==
Initially he established an institution for leprosy patients called Shram Ashram at Singhrot, 15 km from Vadodara. By 1978 they had 400 patients. Post this he left his job as professor and took up Social work as full time activity. Here they spent 10 years serving needy patients. Later on due to some issues with Trustees they left "Shram Mandir".

Soni established a village named ‘Sahyog’, spread over an area of 30 acres near Shamaliya along the highway from Himmatnagar to Shamlaji for people suffering from leprosy. It also provides shelter to Physically handicapped and intellectually disabled people. His organization also serves HIV positive and orphan patients. The collaboration village has now become home to hundreds of people. The village has a hospital, an electoral booth, a primary school, and a grocery shop. It also serves HIV positive, physically handicapped and orphan patients.

This village is maintained by an organization called Sahyog Kushtha Yagna Trust which was established on 14 September 1988; Ganesh Chaturthi Day, with 20 leprosy patients, on the land donated by MR. Ramu of Vijapur Sarvoday Ashram.

== Awards ==
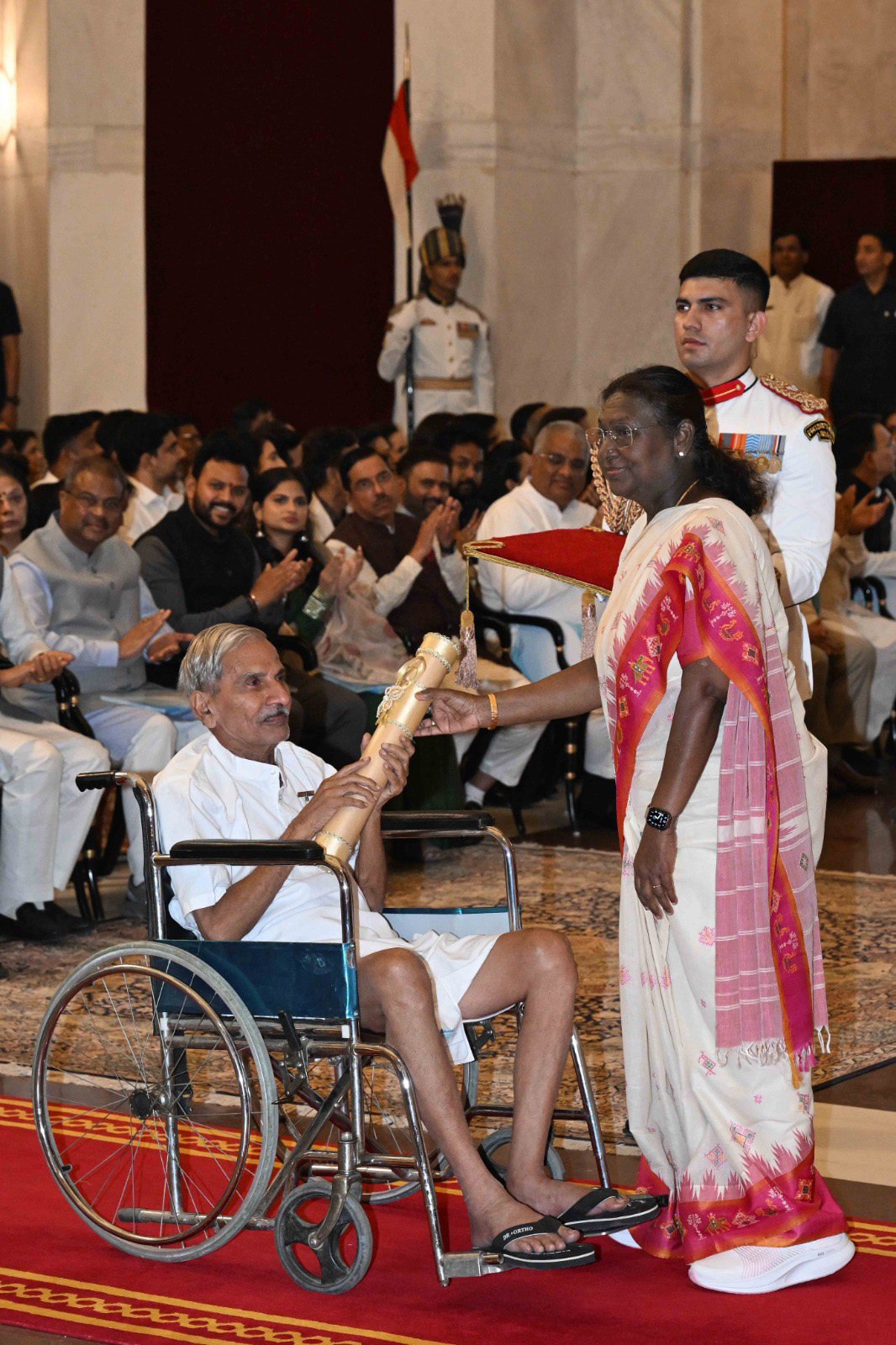
The President of India, Smt Droupadi Murmu presenting the Padma Shri Award to Shri Suresh Harilal Soni at the Civil Investiture Ceremony-I at Rashtrapati Bhavan, in New Delhi on 28 April 2025.

- International Leprosy unit & Sasakava Memorial Health Foundation (Japan) 2006.
- The Government of India conferred Padma Shri award in 2025.
