= Vojtěch Broža =

Czech hydraulic engineer (1935–2026)

Vojtěch Broža DrSc.
- Born: 14 June 1935; Olomouc, Czechoslovakia
- Died: 11 April 2026 (aged 90); Prague, Czech Republic
- Known for: Design contributions to the Orlík Dam, Hracholusky Dam, and Vrchlice Dam

Academic background
- Education: Czech Technical University in Prague

Academic work
- Discipline: Hydraulic engineering
- Sub-discipline: Dams and reservoirs
- Institutions: Czech Technical University in Prague (Faculty of Civil Engineering)
- Notable works: Water Management in Reservoirs (1989); Přehrady Čech, Moravy a Slezska (2005)

Vojtěch Broža (14 June 1935 – 11 April 2026) was a Czech hydraulic engineer who specialised in dams and reservoirs. He was a faculty member of the Czech Technical University in Prague (CTU), where he served as head of its Department of Hydrotechnics from 1977 to 1999 and later as vice rector for international relations.

== Early life and education ==
Broža was born on 14 June 1935 in Olomouc in what was then Czechoslovakia. Between 1953 and 1958, he studied at the Faculty of Civil Engineering (then named the Faculty of Engineering Construction) of the Czech Technical University in Prague. He later earned the academic degree of DrSc. (doktor věd) and the rank of profesor.

== Academic career ==
After graduating in 1958, Broža joined the Department of Hydrotechnics of the Faculty of Civil Engineering at CTU, where he taught for over forty years. He served as head of the department from 1977 to 1999. During his academic career, he was also vice rector of CTU for international relations.

== Death ==
Broža died on 11 April 2026, at the age of 90.

== Selected publications ==
- Votruba, Ladislav; Broža, Vojtěch (1963). Vodohospodářské řešení nádrží. Prague: Státní nakladatelství technické literatury.
- Votruba, Ladislav; Broža, Vojtěch (1966). Hospodaření s vodou v nádržích. Prague: Státní nakladatelství technické literatury.
- Votruba, Ladislav; Broža, Vojtěch; Kazda, Ivo (1979). Přehrady. Prague: Vydavatelství ČVUT.
- Votruba, Ladislav; Broža, Vojtěch (1989). Water Management in Reservoirs. Amsterdam: Elsevier. ISBN 978-0444989390
- Broža, Vojtěch, ed. (2005). Přehrady Čech, Moravy a Slezska. Liberec: Knihy 555.
- Broža, Vojtěch (2014). Prof. Ing. Dr. Ladislav Votruba, DrSc. (1914–2002). Prague: Czech Technical University. ISBN 978-80-01-05493-2
