= Tom Corontzos =

American football player (1969–2026)

Profile
- Position: Quarterback

Personal information
- Born: August 20, 1969; Great Falls, Montana, U.S.
- Died: April 7, 2026 (aged 56)

Career information
- High school: Great Falls (MT)
- College: Wyoming (1988–1991)

Thomas Edward Corontzos (August 20, 1969 – April 7, 2026) is a former American football quarterback. Born and raised in Great Falls, Montana, he attended Great Falls High School. He played college football for the Wyonming Cowbys from 1988 to 1991. He led the 1990 Wyoming team to a 9–3 regular-season record and ranked among the leading quarterbacks in major-college football with 2,730 passing yards in 1990 (9th), 2,868 passing yards in 1991 (7th), and 260.7 yards gained per game played in 1991 (7th). In four years at Wyoming, he completed 558 of 1026 passes (54.4%) for 7,712 yards, 47 touchdowns, 37 interceptions, and a 125.4 passer rating.

Corontzos later received an engineering degree from Gonzaga University. He worked for CH2M Hill and later founded Remedy Engineering, a civil and environmental engineering firm. He died in April 2026 at age 56.

== See also ==
- Wyoming Cowboys football statistical leaders
