= Lawrence J. Ryan =

Australian-German literature scholar (1932–2026)

- Born: Lawrence John Ryan; 20 December 1932; Sydney, New South Wales, Australia
- Died: 5 April 2026 (aged 93); Tübingen, Baden-Württemberg, Germany

Academic background
- Education: University of Sydney, Australia University of Tübingen, Germany

Academic work
- Discipline: German
- Sub-discipline: German literature
- Main interests: Friedrich Hölderlin

Lawrence John Ryan (20 December 1932 – 5 April 2026) was an Australian-born scholar of German literature. He was an emeritus professor of German from the University of Massachusetts, Amherst and an honorary professor of German at the University of Tübingen in Germany.

== Life and career ==
Lawrence John Ryan was born in Sydney, Australia on 20 December 1932. He received a first-class honors leaving certificate from North Sydney Boys High School in 1949, receiving first in German for a Lithgow Scholarship. In 1953, he completed a Bachelor's of Arts from the University of Sydney (conferred 1954). He received his doctorate from the University of Tübingen, Germany, in 1958.

For a number of years, he oversaw the UMASS Baden-Württemberg study abroad program centered in Freiburg, Germany. He also had visiting positions at the University of Heidelberg, Germany, and University of Marburg, Germany.

Until his retirement in 1996, he was Professor of German at the University of Massachusetts, Amherst. He then began an honorary professorship of German at the University of Tübingen in Germany.

He is best known for his studies of the Romantic German poet, Friedrich Hölderlin. He has also published and taught on a range of other German authors, including Heinrich von Kleist, Johann Wolfgang von Goethe, and Franz Kafka.

Ryan died in Tübingen, Germany on 5 April 2026, at the age of 93.

== Works ==
Books

- Hölderlins Lehre vom Wechsel der Töne. Stuttgart, W. Kohlhammer. 1960
- Friedrich Hölderlin. Stuttgart, J.B. Metzler. 1962
- Hölderlins "Hyperion." Exzentrische Bahn und Dichterberuf. Stuttgart, Metzler. 1965

Articles and Book Chapters

- “German Classicism,” Australian Goethe Society Proceedings 5 (1954/55), 76–85.
- “Hölderlins Hellenism,” Journal of the Australasian Universities Modern Language Association 14 (1960), 51–60.
- “Hölderlins Tragic Drama,” German Life and Letters 14 (1961), 141–150.
- “Hölderlins Dichtungsbegriff,” Hölderlin-Jahrbuch 12 (1961/62), 20–41.
- “Hölderlins prophetische Dichtung,” Jahrbuch der Deutschen Schillergesellschaft 6 (1962), 194–228.
- “Hebbels Herodes und Mariamne: Tragödie und Geschichte,” in Hebbel in neuer Sicht, ed. Helmut Kreuzer (Stuttgart, W. Kohlhammer, 1963), 247–266.
- “Die Tragödie des Dichters in Goethes Torquato Tasso,” Jahrbuch der Deutschen Schillergesellschaft 9 (1965), 283–322.
- “Bertolt Brecht: A Marxist Dramatist?,” in Aspects of Drama and the Theatre: Five Kathleen Robinson Lectures Delivered in the University of Sydney, 1961–63 (Sydney: Sydney Univ. Press, 1965), 71–112.
- “Romanticism,” in Periods in German Literature, ed. J. M. Ritchie (London: Oswald Wolff, 1966), 123–143.
- “Die Marionette und das ‘unendliche Bewußtsein’ bei Heinrich von Kleist,” Kleists Aufsatz über das »Marionettentheater«: Studien und Interpretationen, ed. Helmut Sembdner (Berlin: E. Schmidt, 1967), 171–195.
- “Hölderlin und die Französische Revolution,” in Festschrift für Klaus Ziegler, ed. Eckehard Catholy & Winfried Hellman (Tübingen: Niemeyer, 1968), 159–179. (Rpt. in Deutsche Literatur und Französische Revolution: Sieben Studien (Göttingen: Vandenhoeck & Ruprecht, 1974), 129–148.)
- “Die Krise des Romantischen bei Rainer Maria Rilke,” in Das Nachleben der Romantik in der modernen deutschen Literatur: Die Vorträge des zweiten Kolloquiums in Amherst/Massachusetts, ed. Wolfgang Paulsen (Heidelberg: L. Stiehm, 1969), 131–151.
- “Kleists ‘Entdeckung im Gebiete der Kunst’: Robert Guiskard und die Folgen,” in Gestaltungsgeschichte und Gesellschaftsgeschichte, ed. Helmut Kreuzer (Stuttgart: J. B. Metzler, 1969), 242–264.(Rpt. in Kleists Aktualität: Neue Aufsätze und Essays, ed. Walter Müller-Seidel (Darmstadt: Wissenschaftliche Buchgesellschaft), 77–103.)
- “Amphitryon: doch ein Lustspielstoff!,” in Kleist und Frankreich, ed. Walter Müller-Seidel (Berlin: Erich Schmidt, 1969), 83–121.
- “Nachwort,” in Friedrich Hölderlin, Sämtliche Werke und Briefe, 2 vols. (München: Carl Hanser Verlag, 1970; rpt. Darmstadt: Wissenschaftliche Buchgesellschaft, 1970), 1217–1251. (Rpt. 2nd ed. München: Carl Hanser Verlag, 1978; 3rd ed. München: Carl Hanser Verlag, 1981; 4th ed. München: Carl Hanser Verlag, 1984; 5th ed. München: Carl Hanser Verlag, 1989.)
- “Hölderlins Hyperion: ein romantischer Roman?,” in Über Hölderlin, ed. Jochen Schmidt (Frankfurt am Main: Insel, 1970), 175–212. (English version: Lawrence Ryan, “Hölderlins Hyperion: A romantic novel?,” in Friedrich Hölderlin: An Early Modern, ed. Emery E. George (Ann Arbor, Mich.: Univ. of Michigan Press, 1972), 180–215.)
- “‘Zum letztenmal Psychologie!’: Zur psychologischen Deutbarkeit der Werke Franz Kafkas,” in Psychologie in der Literaturwissenschaft: Viertes Amherster Kolloquium zur modernen deutschen Literatur, ed. Wolfgang Paulsen (Heidelberg: L. Stiehm, 1971), 157–173.
- “Johannes R. Becher: Klänge aus Utopia,” in Gedichte der Menschheitsdämmerung: Interpretationen expressionistischer Lyrik, ed. Horst Denkler (München: Wilhelm Fink, 1971), 252–262. (Rpt. in Die Menschheitsdämmerung: Interpretationen expressionistischer Lyrik, ed. Horst Denkler, 2d ed. (München: R. Oldenbourg, 1974), 252–262.)
- “Zur Frage des ‘Mythischen’ bei Hölderlin,” in Hölderlin ohne Mythos, ed. Ingrid Reidel (Göttingen: Vandenhoeck & Ruprecht, 1973), 68–80.
- ‘Ein Traum, was sonst?’: Kleist’s Prinz Friedrich von Homburg,” in Heinrich von Kleist Studies, ed. Alexej Ugrinsky (New York: AMS, 1980), 41–46.
- “Die ‘vaterländische Umkehr’ in der Hermannsschlacht,” in Kleists Dramen: Neue Interpretationen, ed. Walter Hinderer (Stuttgart: Reclam, 1981), 188–212.
- “Zur Kritik der Gewalt bei Heinrich von Kleist,” in Kleist-Jahrbuch 1981/82, 349–357.
- “Jahrhundertwende,” in Geschichte der deutschen Lyrik vom Mittelalter bis zur Gegenwart, ed. Walter Hinderer (Stuttgart: Reclam, 1993), 387–419
- “Hölderlins Antigone: ‘Wie es vom griechischen zum hesperischen gehet’,” in Jenseits des Idealismus: Hölderlins letzte Homburger Jahre (1804–1806), ed. Christoph Jamme & Otto Pöggeler (Bonn: Bouvier, 1988), 103–121.
- “Friedrich Hölderlin (20 March 1770–7 June 1843),” in German Writers in the Age of Goethe, 1789–1832, ed. Christoph E. Schweitzer & James N. Hardin (Detroit: Gale Research, 1989), 171–182.
- “‘Hier oben ist ein neues Vaterland’: Hölderlins Trauerspiel Der Tod des Empedokles,” in Bad Homburger Hölderlin-Vorträge: 1988–89 (Stadt Bad Homburg v.d. Höhe, 1990), 33–48.
- “Hölderlin’s ‘tragische Ode’ ‘Der blinder Sänger’,” in Gedichte und Interpretationen, vol. 3, Klassik und Romantik, ed. Wulf Segebrecht (Stuttgart: Reclam, 1991), 370–79.
- “Friedrich Hölderlin (1770–1843): Hyperion oder der Eremit in Deutschland,” in Deutscher Romanführer, ed. Imma Klemm (Stuttgart: Kröner, 1991), 219–222.
- “Rilke’s Dinggedichte: The ‘Thing’ as ‘Poem in Itself,” in Rilke-Rezeptionen / Rilke Reconsidered, ed. Sigrid Bauschinger & Susan L. Cocalis (Tübingen: Francke, 1995), 27–35.
- “‘So kam ich unter die Deutschen’: Hyperions Weg in die Heimat,” Hölderlin-Jahrbuch 31 (1998/99), 99–122.
- “Neue Gedichte — New Poems,” in A Companion to the Works of Rainer Maria Rilke, ed. Erika A. Metzger & Michael M. Metzger (Rochester, N.Y.: Camden House, 2001; rpt. paperback 2004), 128–153.
- “Hyperion oder der Eremit in Deutschland,” in Hölderlin-Handbuch: Leben, Werk, Wirkung, ed. Johann Kreuzer (Stuttgart: J. B. Metzler, 2002; rpt. paperback 2011), 176–196.
- “‘Vaterländisch und natürlich, eigentlich originell’: Hölderlins Briefe an Böhlendorff,” Hölderlin-Jahrbuch 34 (2005/06), 246–276.
- “‘Was bildet aber, stiften die Dichter’: Zu Hölderlins Konzeption von ‘Bildung’,” Hölderlin-Jahrbuch 36 (2008/09), 30–52.
- “‘In der Götter Namen teilnehmend fühlen’: Zu Kleists Lustspiel Amphitryon,” in Wissensfiguren im Werk Heinrich von Kleists, ed. Lü Yixu, Anthony Stephens et al. (Freiburg: Rombach, 2012), 61–75.

== Awards ==
- Alexander-von-Humboldt-Stiftung Fellowship, 1957–1958
- Guggenheim Fellowship, 1974
