= Victor Agbégnénou =

Togolese inventor and researcher (died 2026)

- Born: Victor Kossikouma Agbégnénou; Togo
- Died: 5 April 2026; France
- Education: Moscow State Academy of Veterinary Medicine and Biotechnology; École nationale vétérinaire d'Alfort
- Occupations: Inventor; Researcher

Victor Kossikouma Agbégnénou (died 5 April 2026) was a Togolese inventor and researcher active in information and communications technology.

== Life and career ==
Born in Togo, Kossikouma attended the Moscow State Academy of Veterinary Medicine and Biotechnology and the École nationale vétérinaire d'Alfort. During his veterinary career, he filed several patents before shifting his focus to communications technology and applied innovation. In 2003, he invented the Polyvalent Wireless Communication System, which was designed to provide telephone, internet, and data transmission services without relying on heavy-duty wired infrastructure. His patent was filed under the World Intellectual Property Organization. He also created the RETICE program, which intended to bring digital technology to the educational systems in Africa. It was specially designed to bring such an education to areas without access to electricity. In 2019, he was honored with the Prix des Réussites Diaspora by the Ministry of Foreign Affairs of Togo.

Agbégnénou died in France on 5 April 2026.
