= Vyacheslav Golishev =

Uzbek politician (1951–2026)

Minister of Economy
- In office 26 June 2005 – 11 April 2006
- Preceded by: Rustam Azimov
- Succeeded by: Botir Xoʻjayev

Personal details
- Born: Vyacheslav Arkadyevich Golishev; 30 March 1951 Tashkent, Uzbek SSR, Soviet Union
- Died: 7 April 2026 (aged 75) Tashkent, Uzbekistan
- Education: Tashkent Institute of Economics
- Occupation: Economist

Vyacheslav Arkadyevich Golishev (30 March 1951 – 7 April 2026) was an Uzbek politician. He served as Minister of Economy from 2005 to 2006.

Golishev died in Tashkent on 7 April 2026, at the age of 75.
