= Dale Hoggins =

American politician (1932–2026)

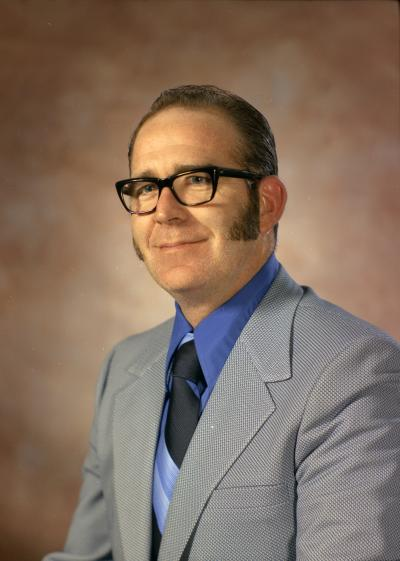
- Hoggins in 1971

Member of the Washington House of Representatives for the 21st district
- In office 1967–1975

Personal details
- Born: April 25, 1932 White Swan, Washington, U.S.
- Died: April 22, 2026 (aged 93)
- Party: Republican
- Spouse: Donna

Dale Edwin Hoggins (April 25, 1932 – April 22, 2026) was an American politician in the state of Washington. He served the 21st district from 1967 to 1975, and was a member of the Republican Party.

Hoggins attended Western Washington University and the University of Washington, earning Bachelor of Arts and Masters of Education degrees. He was an elementary school principal in Mountlake Terrace, Washington when he was first elected to the Washington State Legislature in 1967. During his time in the state house, he served as Chairman of the Education and Libraries committee. Hoggins resides in Edmonds, Washington. He was married to Donna and had three children. Hoggins died on April 22, 2026, three days before his 94th birthday.
