= Maria Agostina Pellegatta =

Italian politician (1938–2026)

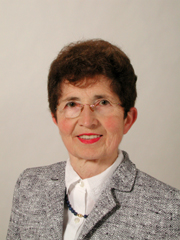
- Pellegatta in 2006

Member of the Senate of the Republic of Italy for Lombardy
- In office 28 April 2006 – 28 April 2008

Member of the Chamber of Deputies of Italy for Como
- In office 25 May 1972 – 19 June 1979

Personal details
- Born: 18 September 1938 Cassano Magnago, Italy
- Died: 10 April 2026 (aged 87) Cassano Magnago, Italy
- Party: PCI (until 1991); PRC (1991–1998); PdCI (1998–2014)
- Occupation: Teacher

Maria Agostina Pellegatta (18 September 1938 – 10 April 2026) was an Italian politician. A member of the Italian Communist Party, the Communist Refoundation Party, and the Party of Italian Communists, she served in the Chamber of Deputies from 1972 to 1979 and in the Senate of the Republic from 2006 to 2008.

Pellegatta died in Cassano Magnago on 10 April 2026, at the age of 87.
