= Ryan Edwards (baritone) =

American operatic baritone

- Born: August 5, 1941; Columbia, South Carolina, U.S.
- Died: April 30, 2026 (aged 84); Highland Park, Illinois, U.S.
- Education: Juilliard School
- Occupation: Operatic baritone
- Website: https://OperaEdwards.com/

Ryan Edwards (August 5, 1941 - April 30, 2026) was an American operatic baritone. Educated at Juilliard School, he performed at the Metropolitan Opera, the New York Philharmonic, the Boston Symphony, the Los Angeles Philharmonic, and the Chicago Symphony.
