= Delphine Noels =

Belgian film director (1973–2026)

- Born: 1973; Liège, Belgium
- Died: 12 April 2026 (aged 53)
- Education: Institut national supérieur des arts du spectacle et des techniques de diffusion
- Occupation: Film director

Delphine Noels (1973 – 12 April 2026) was a Belgian film director.

== Biography ==
Noels was born in Liège. After graduating from INSAS in 2001, she worked as a director and screenwriter at RTBF and directed several short films. She won a special mention at the 2005 IndieLisboa International Independent Film Festival for 1 clé pour 2.

Noels' made her feature film debut with Post partum (2014), a thriller about motherhood starring Mélanie Doutey, Jalil Lespert and Françoise Fabian. This was followed by Demain dès l'aube (2018), which centers around the 2016 Brussels bombings.

Aside from her work as a director, Noels was active in several civic organizations. Together with the Palestinian surgeon Ahmed Moghrabi she founded the organization The Wings of Healing in 2024, with the aim of providing humanitarian aid during the Gaza genocide.

Noels died on 12 April 2026, aged 53.

== Filmography ==
=== Short films ===
- 1 clé pour 2 (2005)
- Ni oui ni non (2007)
- Pole Dance (2017)

=== Feature film ===
- Post partum (2014)
