= Jacques Witt =

French journalist and photographer (1958–2026)

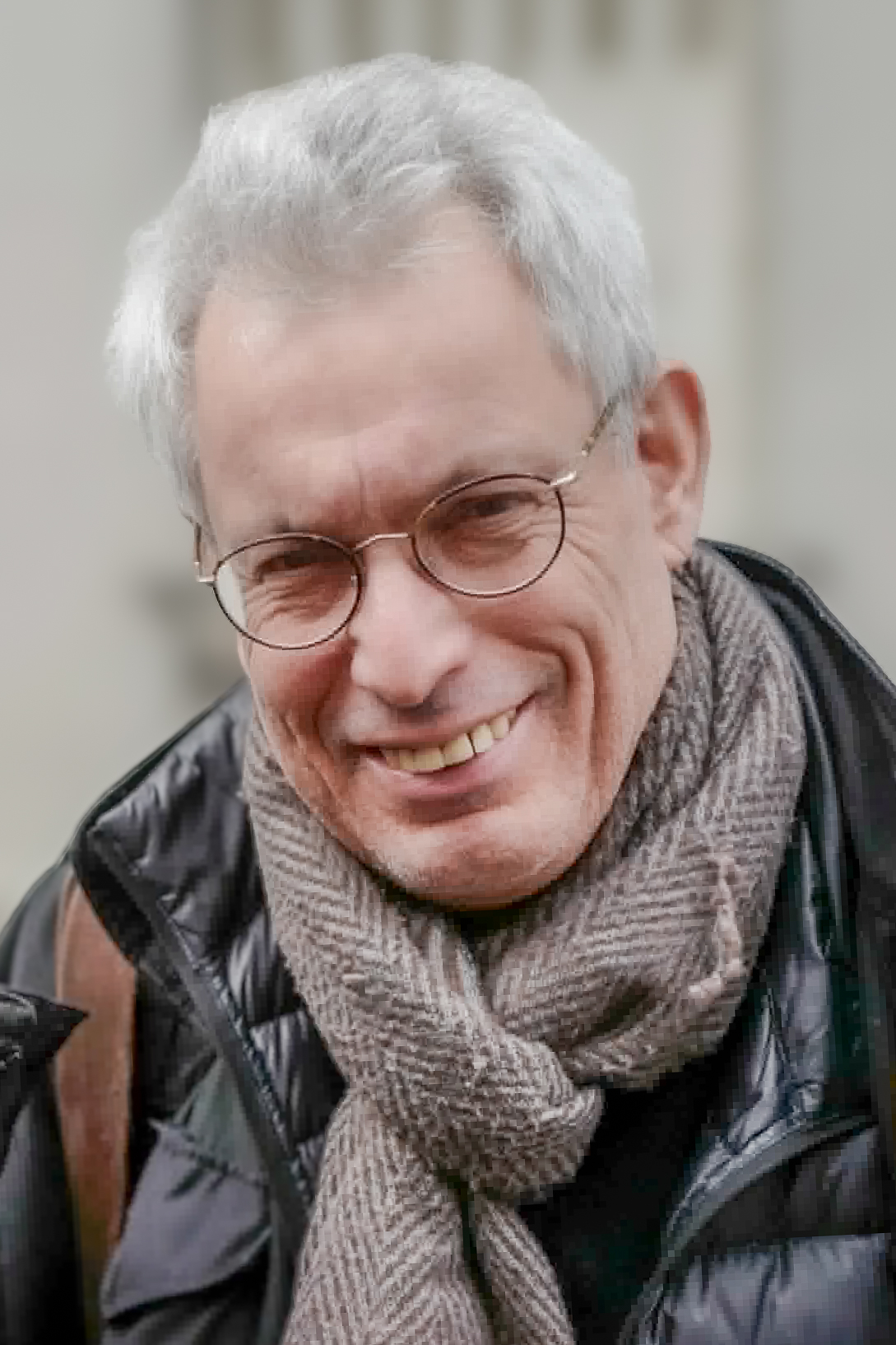
- Jacques Witt (2025)
- Born: 1958; Strasbourg, France
- Died: 11 April 2026 (aged 67–68)
- Education: Lycée Kléber
- Occupations: Journalist; Photographer

Jacques Witt (French: [ʒˈak wˈit]; 1958 – 11 April 2026) was a French journalist and photographer.

== Life and career ==
Born in Strasbourg in 1958, Witt earned his baccalauréat from the Lycée Kléber before joining Dernières Nouvelles d'Alsace in 1980. He also freelanced for Sipa Press before joining its permanent staff in 1984. He received accreditation from the Élysée Palace in 1985, covering events such as the 1985 New Caledonian legislative election, the fall of the Berlin Wall, the release of Nelson Mandela from prison, and the Gulf War.

Witt died on 11 April 2026; a tribute to his life was paid by President Emmanuel Macron.
