= Gerd Winner =

German painter and sculptor (1936–2026)

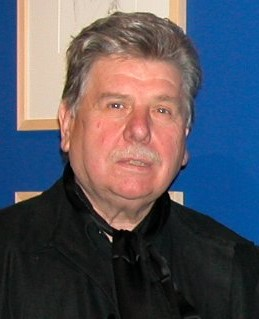
- Winner in 2005
- Born: 8 October 1936; Braunschweig, Gau Southern Hanover-Brunswick, Germany
- Died: 8 April 2026 (aged 89); Liebenburg, Lower Saxony, Germany
- Education: Berlin University of the Arts
- Occupations: Painter; Sculptor

Gerd Winner (8 October 1936 – 8 April 2026) was a German painter and sculptor.

A graduate of the Berlin University of the Arts, he was particularly renowned for his large-format public artworks, which he often created alongside Chris Prater in London. In 2008, he unveiled an altarpiece at a parish in Bad Gandersheim. In 2011, he was named an honorary citizen of Liebenburg. Today, his works can be found at the Tate gallery in London.

Winner died in Liebenburg on 8 April 2026, at the age of 89.
