= Ivan Livingstone =

Canadian football player (1929–2026)

Profile
- Position: Halfback

Personal information
- Born: September 6, 1929; Montreal, Quebec, Canada
- Died: April 23, 2026 (aged 96)
- Listed height: 5 ft 11 in (1.80 m)
- Listed weight: 175 lb (79 kg)

Career history
- 1954: Calgary Stampeders
- 1955: BC Lions
- 1955: Calgary Stampeders
- 1956: BC Lions
- 1957–1960: Montreal Alouettes

Ivan Louis Livingstone (September 6, 1929 – April 23, 2026) was a Canadian professional football player who played for the Calgary Stampeders, Montreal Alouettes, and BC Lions. He died at his home on April 23, 2026, at the age of 96.
