= Amivi Homawoo =

Togolese visual artist and videographer (1975–2026)

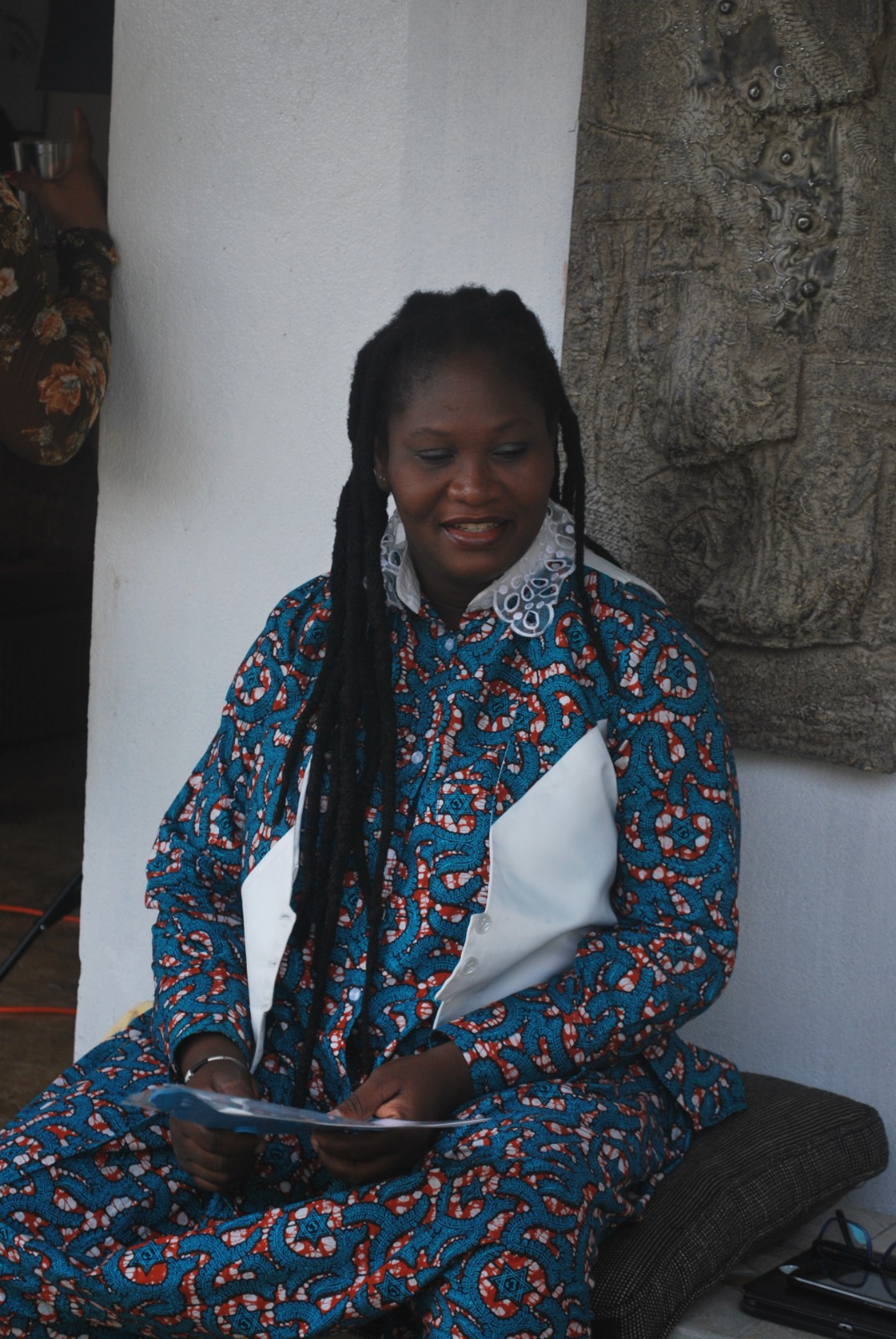
- Homawoo in 2026
- Born: Améyovi Akpéyédjé Homawoo; 5 April 1975; Lomé, Togo
- Died: 11 April 2026 (aged 51); Lomé, Togo
- Education: Institut français du Togo
- Occupations: Visual artist Videographer

Améyovi Akpéyédjé "Amivi" Homawoo (5 April 1975 – 11 April 2026) was a Togolese visual artist and videographer.

== Life and career ==
Born in Lomé on 5 April 1975, Homawoo studied in Togo, Ivory Coast, Benin, and Ghana before graduating from the Institut français du Togo in 2000. In the 2000s, she participated in a variety of workshops, including the Panafrican Film and Television Festival of Ouagadougou, the Biennale de l’art contemporain africain Dak’Art, the Festival panafricain d'Alger, and the Rencontres – Résidences Internationales d’Arts Visuels Ewolé. She also participated in collective exhibitions in Africa, Europe, North America, and Asia. Her paintings often featured slender female silhouettes, stylized forms, and a palette of muted colors. She also practiced sculpture, object design, and video art. She led several initiatives to promote the socioeconomic empowerment of women in rural areas. In 2014, her designs were implemented by Vlisco.

Homawoo died in Lomé on 11 April 2026, at the age of 51.
