= Cho Sang-rae =

South Korean politician (1936–2026)

- 조상래

Member of the National Assembly of South Korea
- In office 11 April 1981 – 29 May 1988

Personal details
- Born: 6 September 1936 Gimje, Korea, Empire of Japan
- Died: 11 April 2026 (aged 89)
- Party: DJP
- Education: Chung-Ang University (BA); Yonsei University (MA)
- Occupation: Businessman

Cho Sang-rae (Korean: 조상래; 6 September 1936 – 11 April 2026) was a South Korean politician. A member of the Democratic Justice Party, he served in the National Assembly from 1981 to 1988.

Cho died on 11 April 2026, at the age of 89.
