= Rico Rizzitelli =

French journalist (1962–2026)

- Born: 12 April 1962; Paris, France
- Died: 15 April 2026 (aged 64); Santiago, Chile
- Occupation: Journalist

Rico Rizzitelli (French: [ʁikˈo ʁizzitɛlˈi]; 12 April 1962 – 15 April 2026) was a French journalist.

Rizzitelli reported for the likes of So Foot, Libération, and L'Équipe and served as correspondent in Chile.

Rizzitelli died from complications from diabetes in Santiago, on 15 April 2026, at the age of 64.
