= Mary Grech =

Maltese actress (1937–2026)

- Born: 2 May 1937
- Died: 24 April 2026 (aged 88)
- Occupation: Actress
- Spouse: Victor Grech

Mary Grech (née Vassallo; 2 May 1937 – 24 April 2026) was a Maltese television presenter and actress. She began her career as an announcer for Malta Television in the 1960s. As actress she acted in the television and theatrical productions such as Ipokriti, Santa Monika, and One Star Hotel. Grech died on 24 April 2026, at the age of 88.
