= John Cheek (lacrosse player) =

American lacrosse attackman (1955–2026)

John Caldwell Cheek (September 25, 1955 – April 3, 2026) was an American lacrosse attackman who played collegiately for Washington College and was a member of the U.S. men's national team at the 1978 World Lacrosse Championship. He was inducted into the National Lacrosse Hall of Fame in 2003.

== Early life and education ==
Cheek was born on September 25, 1955 in Towson, Maryland. He attended Towson High School, where he played lacrosse before continuing at Washington College on an athletic scholarship.

== Career ==
=== College ===
Cheek played at Washington College in Chestertown, Maryland from 1974 to 1977. He concluded his collegiate career as the school's all-time leading goal scorer with 212 career goals, including a school single-season record of 69 goals in 15 games during the 1976 season; both records remain on the school's all-time list.

Cheek earned All-America honors in three consecutive seasons, receiving second-team recognition in 1975 and first-team selection in 1976 and 1977. He was named the Division II/III Player of the Year in 1976 and the Division II/III Attackman of the Year in both 1976 and 1977. In 1977, he was selected to the annual North/South All-Star Game, leading the South squad with five goals.

=== International ===
After graduating, Cheek continued to play in post-collegiate club lacrosse and was selected to the United States men's national team that competed at the 1978 World Lacrosse Championship in England. He was one of two Washington College alumni to be named to a U.S. national team.
