= Sergio Landucci =

Italian philosopher and academic (1938–2026)

Sergio Landucci (1938 – 17 April 2026) was an Italian philosopher and historian of philosophy. He died on 17 April 2026, at the age of 88.
