= Richard Henderson (Hawaii politician) =

American politician (1928–2026)

Member of the Hawaii Senate
- In office 1981–1987
- In office 1971–1978

Personal details
- Born: December 20, 1928 (age 97) Hilo, Hawaii, U.S.
- Party: Republican
- Education: University of Pennsylvania
- Profession: Accountant

Richard "Scotchy" Henderson (December 20, 1928 – April 25, 2026) was an American politician. He served as a member of the Hawaii Senate.

== Life and career ==
Henderson was born in Hilo, Hawaii and attended schooling in Hilo and Oahu. He earned a bachelor's degree in economics from the University of Pennsylvania in 1950. A Republican, Henderson served in the Hawaii Senate from 1970 to 1978 and 1981 to 1987. He served as minority leader from 1983 to 1987. He died on April 25, 2026.
