= Jean-Claude Lozac'hmeur =

French linguist, historian and academic (1940–2026)

- Born: April 1940; Toulon, France
- Died: 2 April 2026 (aged 85); Saint-Malo, France
- Education: Rennes 2 University (DND)
- Occupations: Linguist, historian, academic

Jean-Claude Lozac'hmeur (French: [ʒˈɑ̃-klˈod lozˈak'mˈœʁ]; April 1940 – 2 April 2026) was a French Breton linguist, academic and historian.

== Life and career ==
Born in Toulon in April 1940, Lozac'hmeur grew up in Molène. He earned a Diplôme national de doctorate from Rennes 2 University with a thesis directed by Charles Foulon and titled La Genèse de la légende d'Yvain : essai de synthèse. There, he became a professor and specialized in medieval Celtic literature. He published in journals regularly, traveling across Europe to visit castles once built by Celts. He joined the International Arthurian Society and the Society of Romance Linguistics. His works were cited by Philippe Walter in the Dictionnaire de mythologie arthurienne and Keith Busby in The Evolution of Arthurian Romance.

Lozac'hmeur died in Saint-Malo on 2 April 2026, at the age of 85.

== Publications ==
- La chanson d'Aiquin, présentation, traduction et notes (1985)
- Récits et poèmes celtiques, Domaine brittonique, VIe XVe siècles (1980)
- De la Ré-Volution : essai sur la politique maçonnique (1992)
- Dafydd ap Gwilym, un barde gallois du XIVe siècle, petite anthologie d'un grand poète (1994)
- Fils de la veuve : essai sur le symbolisme maçonnique (2002)
- L'énigme du Graal : aux origines de la légende de Perceval (2011)
- De la Gnose au Graal (2013)
- Les origines occultistes de la franc-maçonnerie (2015)
