= Włodzimierz Korohoda =

Polish cell biologist (1937–2026)

- Born: 1 January 1937; Kraków, Poland
- Died: 24 April 2026 (aged 89)
- Citizenship: Polish
- Occupation: Cell biologist

Włodzimierz Stanisław Korohoda (1 January 1937 – 24 April 2026) was a Polish cell biologist and swimmer.

== Life and career ==
The son of Jerzy Korohoda, father of Jacek Korohoda. He attended the Bartłomiej Nowodoworski High School in Kraków.

From 1948, he competed in swimming in the Cracovia Sports Club. From 1951, he represented Kraków, simultaneously holding the Polish junior and youth champion and record in all breaststroke distances.

Korohoda graduated in biology from the Jagiellonian University in 1959. In 1957 he started working at the Department of Plant Physiology headed by Jan Zurzycki. He obtained doctorate in 1963. In 1965 he received a scholarship from The British Council of The Chester Beatty Royal Institute of Cancer Research in London. He obtained habilitation in 1971. In 1972 he obtained a scholarship at the Institute of Cytology and Micromorphology at the University of Bonn under the supervision of W. Stockem.

From 1979 he was head of the Department of Cell Biology at the Institute of Molecular Biology of the Jagiellonian University; from 1981 to 1984 as its director. He researched on the role of the cell surface complex and the cytoplasmic cytoskeleton in the regulation of cell movement, growth and differentiation. He co-authored more than 120 research papers in peer-reviewed journals. He supervised twenty one doctoral dissertations. In 1991 he was elected a member of the Polish Academy of Arts and Sciences.

Korohoda died on 24 April 2026, at the age of 89.

== Accolades ==
- Jagiellonian University Laurel (2002)

== Bibliography ==
- Beata Cynkier; et al., eds. (2001). Kto jest kim w Polsce, edycja IV. pp. 424–425.
