= Millicent Burgess =

Canadian educator (1923–2026)

- Born: Millicent Eugenie Carey; July 6, 1923; Bermuda
- Died: April 2, 2026 (aged 102); Canada
- Occupation: educator

Millicent Eugenie Burgess (née Carey; July 6, 1923 – April 2, 2026) was a Canadian educator. She may have been the first black teacher for the Toronto District School Board.

== Life and career ==
Millicent Eugenie Carey was born in Bermuda on July 6, 1923. The daughter of James and Doris Carey, she worked as a substitute teacher for several years after completing high school. She began studying at Hamilton Teachers' College in Canada in 1950 after receiving a scholarship from the Bermuda government and completed the last two years of her studies at Toronto Teachers' College.

Burgess then returned to Bermuda and taught for three years. She married Edward Leroy Burgess there in 1954; the couple moved to Canada the following year. She worked as a clerk for Blue Cross in Toronto for one year and then began looking for a teaching position. Burgess was an elementary schoolteacher. During this time, she earned a BA from the University of Toronto by attending night classes.

Burgess retired in 1989, and died on April 2, 2026, at the age of 102.

== Other roles ==
- 1958-: member of the Canadian Negro Women's Association (CANEWA), later the Congress of Black Women of Canada
- 1957-1989: Consultant with the Toronto Board of Education.

== Prizes ==
- 2012: Recipient of the Reverend Addie Aylestock Award from the Ontario Black History Society
