= Wanlop Thaineua =

Thai politician (1945–2026)

- วัลลภ ไทยเหนือ

Member of the House of Representatives of Thailand
- In office 6 February 2005 – 19 September 2006
- In office 23 December 2007 – 3 July 2011

Personal details
- Born: 10 February 1945 Phra Nakhon province, Thailand
- Died: 18 April 2026 (aged 81) Bangkok, Thailand
- Party: Democrat (2004–2007); Puea Pandin (2007–2011)
- Education: Faculty of Medicine Siriraj Hospital, Mahidol University (MD); Johns Hopkins University (MS)
- Occupation: Doctor

Wanlop Thaineua (Thai: วัลลภ ไทยเหนือ; 10 February 1945 – 18 April 2026) was a Thai politician. A member of the Democrat Party and the Puea Pandin Party, he served in the House of Representatives from 2005 to 2006 and 2007 to 2011.

Thaineua died in Bangkok on 18 April 2026, at the age of 81.
