= Piero Dotti =

Italian footballer (1939–2026)

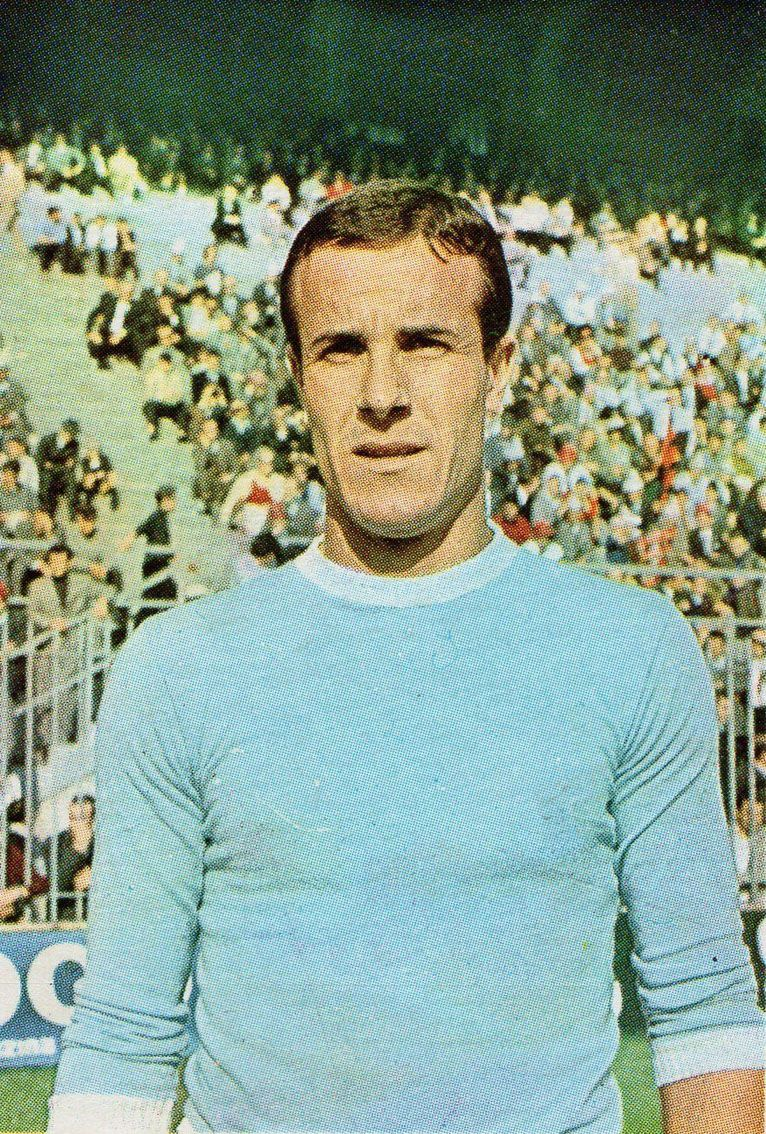
- Dotti with Lazio in 1960

Personal information
- Date of birth: 16 May 1939
- Place of birth: Castelfranco Emilia, Italy
- Date of death: 20 April 2026 (aged 86)
- Height: 1.75 m (5 ft 9 in)
- Position: Defender

Senior career*
Years	Team	Apps	(Gls)
1957–1959	Mirandolese	63	(1)
1959–1964	Messina	154	(2)
1964–1967	Lazio	87	(0)
1967–1968	Inter Milan	13	(1)
1968–1969	Atalanta	25	(0)
1970	Pro Patria	11	(0)
1970–1972	Venezia	36	(0)
- * Club domestic league appearances and goals

Piero Dotti (16 May 1939 – 20 April 2026) was an Italian professional footballer who played as a defender. He died on 20 April 2026, at the age of 86.
