= André de Muralt =

Swiss philosopher (1931–2026)

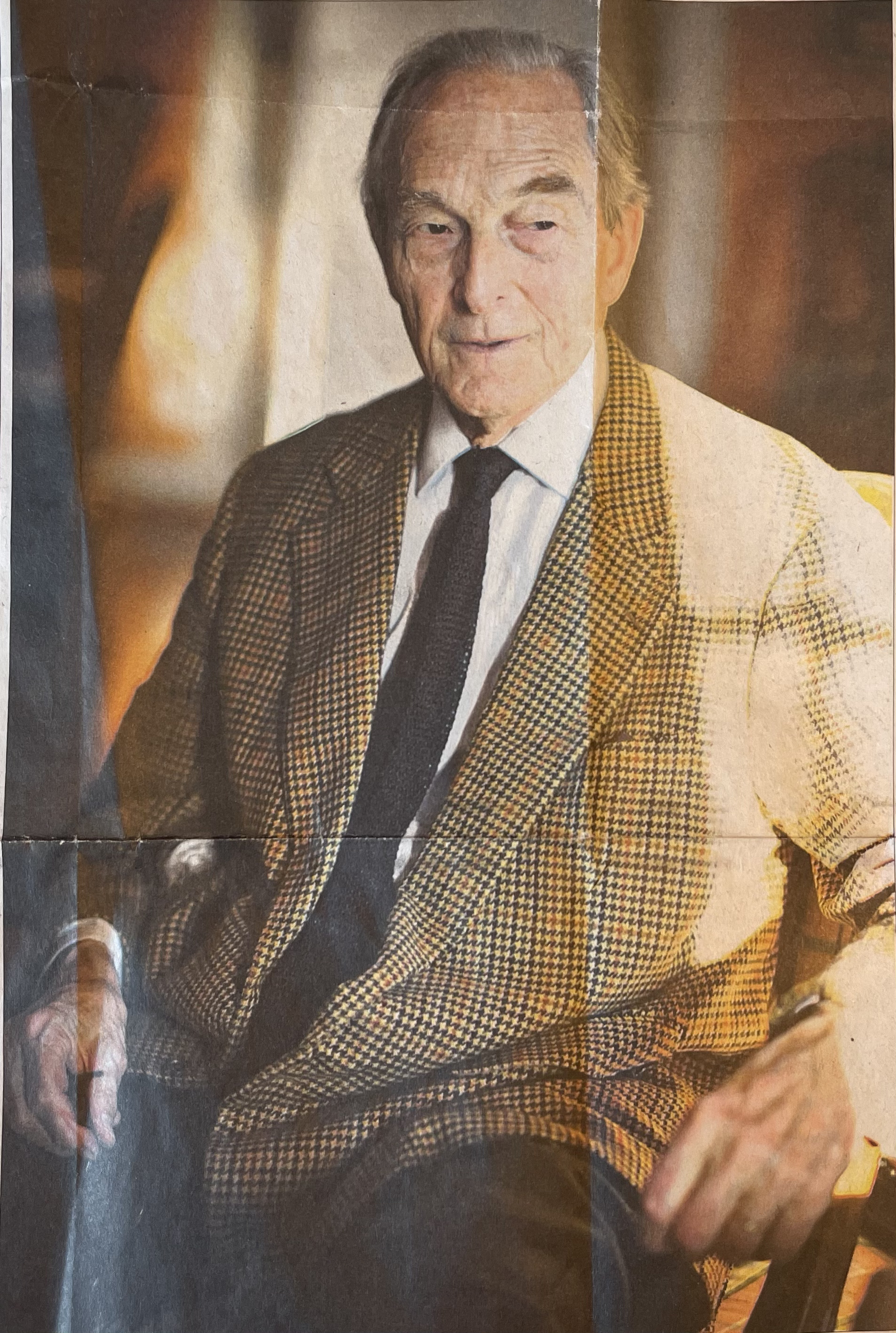
- de Muralt in 2010
- Born: 1 September 1931; Lausanne, Switzerland
- Died: 13 April 2026 (aged 94); Monnaz, Switzerland
- Education: University of Paris
- Occupation: Philosopher

André de Muralt (1 September 1931 – 13 April 2026) was a Swiss philosopher.

Born to parents Elisabeth Feer and Hans de Muralt, he taught medieval philosophy at the University of Geneva and the University of Lausanne after his graduation from the University of Paris. An expert on Edmund Husserl, he also created a new translation of Metaphysics by Aristotle, which won him the 2010 Prix Victor-Delbos of the Académie des Sciences Morales et Politiques.

De Muralt died in Monnaz on 13 April 2026, at the age of 94.

== Publications ==
- L'Idée de la Phénoménologie: L'Exemplarisme Husserlien (1958)
- La conscience transcendantale dans le criticisme kantien, Essai sur l'unité d'aperception (1958)
- Philosophes en Suisse française (1966)
- La métaphysique du phénomène, les origines médiévales et l'élaboration de la pensée phénoménologique (1985)
- L'enjeu de la philosophie Médiévale. Études Thomistes, Scotistes, Occamiennes Et Grégoriennes (1991)
- Néoplatonisme et aristotélisme dans la métaphysique médiévale: analogie, causalité (1995)
- L'unité de la philosophie politique. De Scot, Occam et Suarez au libéralisme contemporain (2002)
- Comment dire l'être ? L'invention du discours métaphysique chez Aristote (2003)
- Les Métaphysiques. Traduction analytique d'André de Muralt (2010)
