= 2026 in literature =

This article contains information about the literary events and publications of 2026.

== Anniversaries ==
- 10 January – Eino Leino died in 1926 (100th Anniversary).
- 12 January
  - Jack London was born in 1876 (150th Anniversary).
  - Agatha Christie died in 1976 (50th Anniversary).
- 13 January – Michael Bond was born in 1926 (100th Anniversary).
- 14 January – Mahasweta Devi was born in 1926 (100th Anniversary).
- 19 January – Hans Sachs died in 1576 (450th Anniversary).
- 24 January – E. T. A. Hoffmann was born in 1776 (250th Anniversary).
- 25 January – Joseph Görres was born in 1776 (250th Anniversary).
- 27 January – Mikhail Saltykov-Shchedrin was born in 1826 (200th Anniversary).
- 3 February – Richard Yates was born in 1926 (100th Anniversary).
- 5 February – Madame de Sévigné was born in 1626 (400th Anniversary).
- 8 February – Neal Cassady was born in 1926 (100th Anniversary).
- 9 February – Larissa Reissner died in 1926 (100th Anniversary).
- 16 February – Joseph Victor von Scheffel was born in 1826 (200th Anniversary).
- 20 February
  - Richard Matheson was born in 1926 (100th Anniversary).
  - Alfonso Sastre was born in 1926 (100th Anniversary).
- 22 February – Zitkala-Ša was born in 1876 (150th Anniversary).
- 24 February – Erich Loest was born in 1926 (100th Anniversary).
- 3 March – Sidney Lee died in 1926 (100th Anniversary).
- 4 March – Léon-Paul Fargue was born in 1876 (150th Anniversary).
- 7 March – Tove Ditlevsen died in 1976 (50th Anniversary).
- 11 March – Louise d'Épinay was born in 1726 (300th Anniversary).
- 17 March – Siegfried Lenz was born in 1926 (100th Anniversary).
- 24 March – Dario Fo was born in 1926 (100th Anniversary).
- 27 March – Frank O'Hara was born in 1926 (100th Anniversary).
- 29 March – Johann Heinrich Voß died in 1826 (200th Anniversary).
- 31 March – John Fowles was born in 1926 (100th Anniversary).
- 1 April – Anne McCaffrey was born in 1926 (100th Anniversary).
- 6 April – Yehuda Bauer was born in 1926 (100th Anniversary).
- 13 April – Marja Kubašec died in 1976 (50th Anniversary).
- 14 April – Averroes was born in 1126 (900th Anniversary).
- 20 April – Dinah Craik was born in 1826 (200th Anniversary).
- 28 April – Harper Lee was born in 1926 (100th Anniversary).
- 1 May – Alexandros Panagoulis died in 1976 (50th Anniversary).
- 8 May – David Attenborough was born in 1926 (100th Anniversary).
- 9 May – Ulrike Meinhof died in 1976 (50th Anniversary).
- 15 May – Anthony and Peter Shaffer were born in 1926 (100th Anniversary).
- 21 May
  - Ronald Firbank died in 1926 (100th Anniversary).
  - Robert Creeley was born in 1926 (100th Anniversary).
- 23 May – Jeanne Julie Éléonore de Lespinasse died in 1776 (250th Anniversary).
- 25 May – Max von der Grün was born in 1926 (100th Anniversary).
- 26 May – Martin Heidegger died in 1976 (50th Anniversary).
- 31 May – James Krüss was born in 1926 (100th Anniversary).
- 2 June – Raul Hilberg was born in 1926 (100th Anniversary).
- 3 June – Allen Ginsberg was born in 1926 (100th Anniversary).
- 4 June – Ain Kaalep was born in 1926 (100th Anniversary).
- 8 June – George Sand died in 1876 (150th Anniversary).
- 19 June – Giangiacomo Feltrinelli was born in 1926 (100th Anniversary).
- 20 June – John Neal died in 1876 (150th Anniversary).
- 25 June – Ingeborg Bachmann was born in 1926 (100th Anniversary).
- 26 June – Adolf Bastian was born in 1826 (200th Anniversary).
- 27 June – Harriet Martineau died in 1876 (150th Anniversary).
- 4 July – Thomas Jefferson died in 1826 (200th Anniversary).
- 12 July
  - Max Jacob was born in 1876 (150th Anniversary).
  - Gertrude Bell died in 1926 (100th Anniversary).
- 18 July – Elizabeth Jennings was born in 1926 (100th Anniversary).
- 6 August – Elisabeth Beresford was born in 1926 (100th Anniversary).
- 14 August – René Goscinny was born in 1926 (100th Anniversary).
- 3 September – Alison Lurie was born in 1926 (100th Anniversary).
- 13 September – Sherwood Anderson was born in 1876 (150th Anniversary).
- 14 September – Michel Butor was born in 1926 (100th Anniversary).
- 22 September – Johann Peter Hebel died in 1826 (200th Anniversary).
- October – John Marston was born in 1576 (450th Anniversary).
- 15 October
  - Michel Foucault was born in 1926 (100th Anniversary).
  - Evan Hunter was born in 1926 (100th Anniversary).
- 1 November – Günter de Bruyn was born in 1926 (100th Anniversary).
- 5 November – John Berger was born in 1926 (100th Anniversary).
- 9 November – Hugh Leonard was born in 1926 (100th Anniversary).
- 11 November – Noah Gordon was born in 1926 (100th Anniversary).
- 15 November – Anna de Noailles was born in 1876 (150th Anniversary).
- 20 November – John Gardner was born in 1926 (100th Anniversary).
- 24 November – Carlo Collodi was born in 1826 (200th Anniversary).
- 25 November – Poul Anderson was born in 1926 (100th Anniversary).
- 12 December – Jean Richepin died in 1926 (100th Anniversary).
- 22 December – Filippo Tommaso Marinetti was born in 1876 (150th Anniversary).
- 23 December – Robert Bly was born in 1926 (100th Anniversary).
- 29 December – Rainer Maria Rilke died in 1926 (100th Anniversary).

== New books ==
Dates after each title indicate U.S. publication, unless otherwise indicated.

=== Children's and young adults ===
New children's and young adult, sorted by date of publication
| Author | Title | Date of pub. | Ref. |

=== Fiction ===
New adult fiction, sorted by date of publication
| Author | Title | Date of pub. | Ref. |
|---|---|---|---|
| Rachel Hawkins | The Storm | January 6 | |
| Gabriel Tallent | Crux | January 6 | |
| Daniyal Mueenuddin | This Is Where the Serpent Lives | January 13 | |
| Julian Barnes | Departure(s) | January 20 | |
| Jim Butcher | Twelve Months | January 20 | |
| Nina McConigley | How to Commit a Postcolonial Murder | January 20 | |
| Jennette McCurdy | Half His Age | January 20 | |
| Angela Tomaski | The Infamous Gilberts | January 20 | |
| Rocket Shokai, illus. toi8 | Scum of the Brave | January 23 | |
| Patmeena Sabit | Good People | February 3 | |
| Matt Dinniman | Operation Bounce House | February 10 | |
| Rebecca Novack | Murder Bimbo | February 10 | |
| Mark Greaney | The Hard Line | February 17 | |
| Nitin Kushalappa | Folktales, Myths and Legends from the Deccan | March 5 | |
| Viola Davis and James Patterson | Judge Stone | March 9 | |
| Adrian Tchaikovsky | Children of Strife | March 17 | |
| Woody Brown | Upward Bound | March 31 | |
| Lindsey Davis | Murder in Purple and Gold | April 2 (UK) | |
| Caro Claire Burke | Yesteryear | April 7 | |
| Jiyoung Han | Honey in the Wound | April 7 | |
| Marcus Kliewer | The Caretaker | April 21 | |
| Karen Tei Yamashita | Questions 27 & 28 | April 28 | |
| Douglas Stuart | John of John | May 5 | |
| Matt Haig | The Midnight Train | May 21 (UK) | |
| Dave Eggers | Contrapposto | June 6 | |
| Joyce Carol Oates | The Frenzy | June 16 | |
| M. John Harrison | The End of Everything | June 18 (UK) | |
| Danny McBride | Thrilling Tales of Modern Men | June 23 | |
| Paul Yoon | Etna | August 4 | |

=== Poetry ===
New poetry, sorted by date of publication
| Author | Title | Date of pub. | Ref. |

=== Drama ===
New drama, sorted by date of publication
| Author | Title | Date of pub. | Ref. |

=== Nonfiction ===
New nonfiction, sorted by date of publication
| Author | Title | Date of pub. | Ref. |
|---|---|---|---|
| Carrie Gibson | The Great Resistance: The 400-Year Fight to End Slavery in the Americas | January 6 | |
| Jacob Soboroff | Firestorm: The Great Los Angeles Fires and America's New Age of Disaster | January 6 | |
| Belle Burden | Strangers: A Memoir of Marriage | January 13 | |
| C. Thi Nguyen | The Score: How to Stop Playing Somebody Else's Game | January 13 | |
| Mark Braude | The Typewriter and the Guillotine: An American Journalist, a German Serial Killer, and Paris on the Eve of WWII | January 20 | |
| Chuck Klosterman | Football | January 20 | |
| Nicolas Niarchos | The Elements of Power: A Story of War, Technology, and the Dirtiest Supply Chain on Earth | January 20 | |
| Elliot Williams | Five Bullets: The Story of Bernie Goetz, New York's Explosive '80s, and the Subway Vigilante Trial that Divided the Nation | January 20 | |
| Brooke N. Newman | The Crown's Silence: The Hidden History of Slavery and the British Monarchy (Note: Book is subtitled "The Hidden History of the British Monarchy and Slavery in the Americas" in the United States.) | January 27 | |
| Josh Shapiro | Where We Keep the Light: Stories from a Life of Service | January 27 | |
| Heather Ann Thompson | Fear and Fury: The Reagan Eighties, the Bernie Goetz Shootings, and the Rebirth of White Rage | January 27 | |
| Cristina Rivera Garza | Autobiography of Cotton | February 3 | |
| Julio Scherer Ibarra | Ni venganza ni perdón | February 11 | |
| Kate Brown | Tiny Gardens Everywhere: The Past, Present and Future of the Self-Provisioning City | February 17 | |
| Ryan Gingeras | Mafia: A Global History | February 17 | |
| Gavin Newsom | Young Man in a Hurry | February 24 | |
| Michael Pollan | A World Appears: A Journey Into Consciousness | February 24 | |
| David Miles | Sneeze: The History and Science of the Common Cold | March 16 (UK) | |
| Quinn Slobodian and Ben Tarnoff | Muskism: A Guide for the Perplexed | April 21 | |
| Roy Altman | Israel on Trial | April 28 | |
| Steven Rosenbaum | The Future of Truth: How AI Reshapes Reality | May 12 | |
| Isaac Fitzgerald | American Rambler | May 12 | |
| Doireann Ní Ghríofa | Said the Dead | May 21 | |
| Matthew Campbell | The Man Who Stole the Gods | June 2 | |
| Maggie Haberman and Jonathan Swan | Regime Change: Inside the Imperial Presidency of Donald Trump | June 23 | |
| Nikolas Bowie and Daphna Renan | Supremacy: How Rule by the Court Replaced Government by the People | September 15 | |
| Akbar Shahid Ahmed | Crossing the Red Line: Biden, His Advisors, and Israel's War in Gaza | September 22 | |
| Brett McGurk | Brink: Inside the Race to Free the October 7th Hostages | October 6 | |

=== Biography and memoir ===
New biography and memoir, sorted by date of publication
| Author | Title | Date | Ref. |
|---|---|---|---|
| George T. Nagel | Paradise Cove: They Escaped the Cuckoo's Nest | January 5 | |
| Vasili Mitrokhin | The Spy in the Archive | January 6 | |
| Russell Myers | William & Catherine: The Intimate Inside Story | February 26 | |
| Liza Minnelli | Kids, Wait Till You Hear This! | March 10 | |
| Tom Bower | Betrayal: Power, Deceit and the Fight for the Future of the Royal Family | March 26 | |
| Brandy Norwood | Phases | March 31 | |
| Changpeng Zhao | Freedom of Money: A Memoir of Protecting Users, Resilience, and the Founding of Binance | April 8 | |
| Robert Hardman | Elizabeth II: In Private. In Public. The Inside Story | April 9 | |
| Lena Dunham | Famesick | April 14 | |
| Kimberlé Crenshaw | Backtalker: An American Memoir | May 5 | |
| JD Vance | Communion | June 16 | |

=== Graphic novels and comics ===
New graphic novels and comics, sorted by date of publication
| Author | Title | Date | Ref. |
|---|---|---|---|
| Adrien Demont | Train de nuit dans la Voie lactée | January 14 | |
| Rodolphe, illus. by Griffo | Chagrin | March 4 | |
| Maria Costa | Forgive-Me-Not | April 14 | |
| Xavier Coste | Sculpter l'éternité | April 15 | |
| Niki Smith | Midsummer Sisters | June 9 | |

== Deaths ==
| Individual | Background | Date of death | Age | Cause of death | Ref. |
|---|---|---|---|---|---|
| Brian Doyle | Canadian writer | January 1 | 90 | | |
| James Grauerholz | American writer and book editor | January 1 | 73 | Complications of pneumonia | |
| Sukumar Barua | Bangladeshi poet | January 2 | 87 | | |
| Franz Herre | German biographer | January 3 | 99 | | |
| Renée Good | American writer and poet | January 7 | 37 | Shot by law enforcement | |
| Astrid Roemer | Surinamese-Dutch writer | January 8 | 78 | | |
| Kjersti Scheen | Norwegian writer and illustrator | January 8 | 82 | | |
| Frank J. Frost | American scholar and writer | January 9 | 96 | | |
| Erich von Däniken | Swiss author | January 10 | 90 | | |
| Karl Riha | German poet, writer and literary scholar | January 10 | 90 | | |
| Scott Adams | American author and cartoonist | January 13 | 68 | Cancer | |
| Kim Sin-yong | South Korean poet and writer | January 15 | 80 | | |
| Hermann Peter Piwitt | German writer | January 15 | 90 | | |
| James Petras | American sociologist and political writer | January 17 | 89 | | |
| Alan Musgrave | New Zealand philosopher and essayist | January 20 | 85 | | |
| Allan Chapman | British historian of science and author | January 21 | 79 | | |
| Kalin Terziyski | Bulgarian poet and writer | January 22 | 55 | | |
| Roland Huntford | British biographer | January 23 | 98 | | |
| David Abulafia | British historian and author | January 24 | 76 | | |
| Michael Parenti | American non-fiction writer | January 24 | 92 | | |
| Marie Rouanet | French Occitan writer | January 25 | 89 | | |
| Mark Tully | British journalist and writer | January 25 | 90 | | |
| Sia Figiel | Samoan poet and writer | January 26 | 59 | | |
| James Sallis | American writer, poet and biographer | January 27 | 81 | | |
| Gloria Wade-Gayles | African-American academic and non-fiction writer | January 27 | 88 | | |
| Vénus Khoury-Ghata | Lebanese-French poet and writer | January 28 | 88 | | |
| Graham E. Fuller | American political analyst and author | January 29 | 89 | Heart problems | |
| Diana Ferrus | South African poet and storyteller | January 30 | 72 | | |
| X. J. Kennedy | American poet, author and editor | January 30 | 96 | | |
| Rita Süssmuth | German politician and non-fiction writer | February 1 | 88 | | |
| Gabor Boritt | American historian and author | February 2 | 86 | | |
| Miroslav Košuta | Slovene poet, playwright and translator | February 2 | 89 | | |
| Teresa de Lauretis | Italian academic, feminist and author | February 2 | 87 | | |
| Myra MacPherson | American author, biographer and journalist | February 2 | 91 | | |
| Allan Massie | Scottish writer and literary reviewer | February 3 | 87 | Cancer | |
| Fernand Ouellette | Canadian Quebecois poet, writer and essayist | February 3 | 95 | | |
| Thuraya Qabil | Saudi Arabian poet and journalist | February 4 | 85 | | |
| Zohar Shavit | Israeli scholar, author and translator | February 4 | 74 | | |
| Jeffrey Carver | American science fiction author | February 6 | 76 | | |
| Lina Brockdorff | Maltese writer, playwright and radio broadcaster | February 10 | 95 | | |
| Biodun Jeyifo | Nigerian literary critic, cultural theorist and essayist | February 11 | 80 | | |
| Cees Nooteboom | Dutch poet and writer | February 11 | 92 | | |
| Roy Medvedev | Russian studies scholar and political writer | February 13 | 100 | | |
| Susan George | American-French political and social scientist and writer | February 14 | 91 | | |
| Michael Silverblatt | American literary critic and broadcaster | February 14 | 73 | | |
| Pol Greisch | Luxembourgian dramatist and writer | February 15 | 95 | | |
| Thomas De Koninck | Canadian philosopher and author | February 16 | 91 | | |
| Dmitry Bavilsky | Russian writer, literary critic and journalist | February 17 | 57 | | |
| Anna dePeyster | British and Australian journalist and novelist | February 17 | 81 | | |
| Svein Jarvoll | Norwegian poet, writer, translator and essayist | February 18 | 79 | | |
| Lee Hye-gyeong | South Korean writer | February 20 | 65 | | |
| Sankar | Indian writer | February 20 | 92 | Age-related health problems | |
| Dan Simmons | American science fiction and horror writer | February 21 | 77 | Complications from a stroke | |
| Ali Babachahi | Iranian poet, writer, and literary critic | February 23 | 83 | | |
| Coleman Barks | American poet and interpreter of Rumi | February 23 | 88 | | |
| Glaudi Barsotti | French Occitan writer and journalist | February 23 | 92 | | |
| Andrej Medved | Slovenian poet, editor and translator | February 23 | 79 | | |
| Gregorio Morán | Spanish journalist and writer | February 23 | 79 | | |
| Nina Gabrielyan | Russian poet, writer, and poetry translator | February 24 | 72 | | |
| Ann Godoff | American editor and publisher | February 24 | 76 | Complications from bone cancer | |
| Jeremy Larner | American author and poet | February 24 | 88 | Parkinson's disease and lymphoma | |
| William E. Connolly | American political theorist and author | February 25 | 88 | | |
| Rob Grant | English comedy writer and television producer | February 25 | 70 | | |
| T. K. Oommen | Indian sociologist and non-fiction writer | February 26 | 88 | | |
| Jeelani Bano | Indian writer | March 1 | 89 | | |
| Mark Bittner | American writer | March 1 | 74 | Heart attack | |
| Jacopo Camagni | Italian illustrator and comics artist | March 1 | 48 | Complications from heart surgery | |
| Jahanara Arzu | Bangladeshi poet | March 2 | 93 | | |
| Nikolay Kolyada | Russian writer, playwright, playwriting teacher and director | March 2 | 68 | | |
| Hélène Mouchard-Zay | French academic and writer | March 2 | 85 | | |
| Diamond Dave Whitaker | American poet and activist | March 2 | 88 | | |
| Unni-Lise Jonsmoen | Norwegian illustrator and children's writer | March 3 | 89 | | |
| Peter Schneider | German writer (Berlin Now) | March 3 | 85 | Cancer | |
| Ahmed Ibrahim Darwish | Egyptian writer and poet | March 4 | 83 | | |
| Maurice J. Freedman | American librarian, president of the American Library Association (2002–2003) | March 5 | 86 | | |
| António Lobo Antunes | Portuguese writer | March 5 | 83 | | |
| Gerda Antti | Swedish writer | March 6 | 96 | | |
| Francisco Fernández Carvajal | Spanish priest and writer | March 6 | 88 | | |
| Eigra Lewis Roberts (Note: Death announced on this date) | Welsh writer, playwright, and poet | March 6 | 86 | | |
| Franco Vito Gaiezza | Italian musician and writer | March 6 | 66 | Heart attack | |
| Lutfiya al-Dulaimi | Iraqi writer and women's rights activist | March 8 | 87 | | |
| Maricla Boggio | Italian writer | March 8 | 88 | | |
| Curzia Ferrari | Italian writer | March 8 | 96 | | |
| Walid Khalidi | Palestinian historian and non-fiction writer | March 8 | 100 | | |
| | Koji Suzuki, 68, Japanese writer (Ring, Dark Water). | March 8 | | | |
| B. Wongar | Serbian-Australian writer | March 8 | 94 | | |
| Umberto Allemandi | Italian publisher | March 9 | 88 | | |
| Patricia Clarke | Australian writer, historian and journalist | March 9 | 99 | | |
| Alfredo Bryce Echenique | Peruvian writer (A World for Julius) | March 10 | 87 | | |
| Michael Hague | American illustrator (The Hobbit, Alice's Adventures in Wonderland) | March 10 | 77 | | |
| Alojz Ihan | Slovenian immunologist, poet, and essayist | March 10 | 64 | | |
| Lloyd Jones | Welsh poet, novelist and photographer | March 10 | 74 | | |
| Fumiko Takeshita | Japanese novelist | March 10 | 69 | | |
| Paul R. Ehrlich | American biologist, environmentalist, and author (The Population Bomb) | March 13 | 93 | | |
| John M. Perkins | American Christian preacher, civil rights activist, and author | March 13 | 95 | | |
| Jürgen Habermas | German philosopher and social theorist | March 14 | 96 | | |
| Len Deighton | British spy novelist and illustrator (The IPCRESS File, An Expensive Place to Die, XPD). | March 15 | 97 | | |
| William C. Dietz | American science fiction writer (Halo: The Flood) | March 15 | 80 | | |
| Sam Kieth | American comic book artist and writer (The Maxx, Zero Girl) | March 15 | 63 | Complications from Lewy Body dementia | |
| Bjørn Nilsen | Norwegian poet, journalist and television producer | March 16 | 91 | | |
| Aníbal Cristobo | Argentine poet | March 17 | 54 | | |
| Abd Alghani Abu Alazm | Moroccan writer | March 18 | 83 | | |
| Ted Booth | British poet | March 20 | 87 | | |
| Božo Koprivica | Serbian essayist, dramatic adviser, and literary critic | March 20 | 75 | | |
| Calvin Tomkins | American author and art critic (The New Yorker), | March 20 | 100 | Stroke | |
| Hermann Huppen | Belgian comic book creator (Jeremiah) | March 22 | 87 | | |
| Peter Stead | Welsh writer | March 23 | 83 | | |
| Tracy Kidder | American writer (The Soul of a New Machine, Mountains Beyond Mountains), Pulitzer Prize winner (1982) | March 24 | 80 | Lung cancer | |
| Alexander Kluge | German writer, philosopher, and film director | March 25 | 94 | | |
| Tordis Ørjasæter | Norwegian literary critic | March 25 | 99 | | |
| Wiesław Myśliwski | Polish novelist, dramatist and essayist | March 29 | 94 | | |
| Salvador Castañeda Álvarez | Mexican writer | April 1 | 79 | | |
| Jacques Michon | Canadian literary historian and academic | April 1 | 80 | | |
| Kristian Gerner | Swedish historian and author. | April 2 | 83 | | |
| Nanni Cagnone | Italian poet | April 3 | 86 | | |
| Harry Keyishian | American literary editor (FDU Press) and academic | April 4 | 93 | | |
| Roberto Zapperi | Italian historian and writer | April 4 | 94 | | |
| Zori Balayan | Armenian writer | April 5 | 91 | | |
| Rusmir Mahmutćehajić | Bosnian writer and politician | April 5 | 77 | | |
| Josep Piera | Spanish poet and author | April 5 | 78 | | |
| Mihail Belchev | Bulgarian singer, songwriter and poet | April 6 | 79 | | |
| Gabriel Rosenstock | Irish poet and writer | April 6 | 76 | Cancer | |
| Beppe Sebaste | Italian writer, poet and journalist (L'Unità, La Repubblica) | April 6 | 66 | | |
| Rosemary Edghill | American author | April 7 | 69 | Sepsis | |
| Mario Adorf | German actor and writer | April 8 | 95 | | |
| Nguyễn Đức Mậu | Vietnamese poet | April 8 | 78 | | |
| Robert Bagg | American poet | April 9 | 90 | | |
| Eirwyn George | Welsh poet | April 9 | 89 | | |
| Colette Khoury | Syrian novelist and poet | April 10 | 95 | | |
| May Angeli | French artist and author | April 11 | 88 | | |
| Bernard Eliade | French writer and teacher | April 13 | 87 | | |
| Ian Watson | British science fiction author (The Jonah Kit, Chekhov's Journey) and screenwriter | April 13 | 82 | | |
| Frederick William Ratcliffe | British librarian | April 16 | 98 | | |
| John R. Reed | American academic and writer | April 16 | 88 | | |
| Georges Benrekassa | French historian and literary critic | April 19 | 93–94 | | |
| Dominique Douay | French science fiction author | April 19 | 82 | | |
| Desmond Morris | English zoologist, ethologist and author | April 19 | 98 | | |
| Mukhtar Shakhanov | Kazakh poet and politician, MP (2004–2007) | April 19 | 83 | | |
| Manfred Böckl | German writer | April 20 | 77 | | |
| Rita Mulier | Belgian feminist author and economist | April 20 | 91 | | |
| Mariano Baptista Gumucio | Bolivian politician and writer | April 21 | 92 | | |
| Carlos Mella | Spanish writer and politician | April 21 | 95 | | |
| Jean-Benoît Meybeck | French comic book author and illustrator | April 21 | 53 | | |
| Barrie Tomlinson | British comic book editor and writer (Roy of the Rovers, Speed, Wildcat) | April 21 | 88 | | |
| Peter J. Carroll | British occultist and writer | April 22 | 72–73 | | |
| Daniel L'Homond | French storyteller and author | April 22 | | | |
| David Malouf | Australian poet and writer | April 22 | 92 | | |
| J. H. Prynne | British poet and literary critic | April 22 | 89 | | |
| Musa Akhmadov | Russian playwright, poet and writer | April 23 | 70 | | |
| Hirohiko Okano | Japanese poet | April 24 | 101 | Heart failure | |
| Annette Macarthur-Onslow | Australian illustrator (Nordy Bank, Pastures of the Blue Crane) and author | April 25 | 93 | | |
| Carol Rumens | British poet | April 25 | 81 | | |
| Gerry Conway | American comic book writer (The Amazing Spider-Man, Punisher, Justice League) | April 26 | 73 | Pancreatic cancer | |
| Dick Matena | Dutch comics writer (Storm) and cartoonist (Tom Puss, Panda) | April 26 | 83 | | |
| Alfred Slote | American children's author | April 26 | 99 | | |
| Len Strazewski | American comic book writer (Starman, The Flash, Justice Society of America). | April 27 | 71 | | |
| Volker Hage | German journalist, literary critic, biographer and novelist | April 29 | 76 | | |
| Aiko Satō | Japanese writer | April 29 | 102 | | |
| Gordon Snell | British children's author | April 29 | 93 | | |
| Madeleine Gagnon | Canadian writer and literary critic. | April 30 | 87 | | |
| Emily Grosholz | American poet | May 2 | 75 | | |
| Donald Sidney-Fryer | American poet, critic and literary historian | May 2 | 91 | Bone cancer | |
| Jean Alambre | French author and songwriter | May 3 | 79 | | |
| Marcel Labine | Canadian poet | May 4 | 78 | | |
| Judith Barnard | American writer (as Judith Michael) | May 7 | 94 | Heart failure | |
| Philip Caputo | American author (A Rumor of War) and journalist | May 7 | 84 | Cancer | |
| Michael Pennington | English actor, director and writer | May 7 | 82 | | |
| Koji Suzuki | Japanese writer | May 8 | 68 | | |
| Alan Gribben | American literary scholar. | May 9 | 84 | | |
| Frid Ingulstad | Norwegian novelist and stenographer | May 9 | 90 | Complications from Parkinson's disease | |
| Margareta Waterman | American poet and publisher | May 9 | 93 | | |
| Herb Wharton | Australian writer | May 12 | 89–90 | | |
| Zoya Boguslavskaya | Russian poet and writer | May 14 | 102 | | |
| Conceição Lima | São Toméan poet | May 15 | 64 | | |
| Huguette Bouchardeau | French novelist, biographer, essayist, publisher, and politician | May 18 | 90 | | |
| Alan Bradley | Canadian writer (The Sweetness at the Bottom of the Pie) | May 18 | 87 | | |
| Marideth Sisco | American author and musician | May 18 | 82 | | |
| Veronika Valentová | Czech writer and translator | May 19 | 52 | | |
| Hieromonk Roman | Russian hieromonk, poet and singer | May 19 | 71 | | |
| Jeffrey Lane | American television writer (Ryan's Hope, Mad About You) and playwright | May 20 | 71 | | |
| Julienne Bušić | American writer, hijacker, and activist | May 21 | 77 | | |
| Liu Zaifu | Chinese writer, poet and literary theorist | May 24 | 84 | | |
| Tim Johnston | American author | May 26 | 63 | Brain cancer | |
| Maureen Duffy | English poet, playwright and novelist | May 27 | 92 | | |
| Bashir Badr | Indian poet | May 28 | 91 | | |
| Plinio Perilli | Italian poet | May 30 | 70 | | |
| Aleksandr Ivanchenko | Russian writer | June 1 | 80 | | |
| Stéphane-Albert Boulais | Canadian writer and film critic | June 1 | 76 | | |
| John Blanche | British fantasy and science fiction illustrator (White Dwarf, Warhammer 40,000) | June 1 | 77 | | |
| Mildred Pitts Walter | American writer | June 2 | 103 | | |
| Homa Mirafshar | Iranian poet | June 2 | 89 | | |
| Lieke Marsman | Dutch poet | June 3 | 35 | Cancer | |
| Jagannath Prasad Das | Indian writer and poet | June 3 | 90 | | |
| Robert Coles | American child psychiatrist and author (Children of Crisis), Pulitzer Prize winner (1973) | June 4 | 97 | | |
| Rabilal Tudu | Indian Santali writer | June 4 | 76 | | |
| Marjane Satrapi (Note: Discrepancies occurred surrounding not only Satrapi's date of death, but when the death had been announced. Satrapi's family made the announcement through Agence France-Presse on 4 June, but sources such as La Croix and Variety, when referencing the statement, erroneously gave the announcement date as 3 June. Subsequent reporting cited the 4th as the date of death, with the Académie des Beaux-Arts, where Satrapi was a member, publishing an announcement that Satrapi died on the 4th.) | Iranian and French comic book author (Persepolis) | June 4 | 56 | | |
| Beppe Costa | A. C. Sreehari, 56, Indian poet and writer | June 5 | 56 | | |
| Ingeborg Kaiser | German-Swiss writer | June 6 | 95 | | |
| Ibrohim Gʻafurov | Uzbek writer, translator and politician, and MP (1999–2004) | June 6 | 88 | | |
| Gordon S. Wood | American historian (The Radicalism of the American Revolution, Empire of Liberty: A History of the Early Republic, 1789–1815), Pulitzer Prize winner (1993) | June 7 | 92 | Traffic collision | |
| Jean Fourié | French writer and community activist | June 8 | 81 | | |
| Matteo Fantuzzi | Italian poet | June 9 | 46 | Cancefr | |
| Manu Lann Huel | French singer-songwriter and poet | June 10 | 77 | | |
| Beppe Costa | Italian writer | June 10 | 84 | | |
| Jane Yolen | American author (The Devil's Arithmetic, Owl Moon, Commander Toad) and editor | June 11 | 87 | | |
| Lhasang Tsering | Tibetan writer and political activist | June 11 | 74 | | |
| Mary Hooper | British author | June 12 | 81 | | |
| André Doms | Belgian essayist, poet, and writer. | June 12 | 94 | | |
| Beatrice Lumpkin | American union organizer, activist and writer | June 14 | 107 | | |
| Stephen Dobyns | American poet | June 14 | 85 | | |
| Robert Thurman | American Buddhist writer and academic | June 16 | 84 | | |
| Raimundo Carrero | Brazilian writer | June 16 | 78 | Cancer | |
| Al Mujahidi | Bangladeshi poet | June 18 | 83 | | |
| Samīra al-Māni' | Iraqi writer | June 19 | 91 | | |
| Hershel Parker | American literary historian and scholar (Herman Melville) | June 19 | 90 | | |
| Slavenka Drakulić | Croatian journalist, novelist (Café Europa, They Would Never Hurt a Fly) and essayist | June 20 | 76 | | |
| P. Narayana Kurup | Indian poet and literary critic | June 20 | 91 | | |
| András Simor | Hungarian poet | June 21 | 87 | | |
| Jim Goad | American writer (Answer Me!, The Redneck Manifesto) | June 22 | 65 | | |
| François Taillandier | French writer and journalist | June 23 | 71 | | |
| Caroline S. Wagner | American academic and author, pancreatic cancer | June 24 | 71 | | |
| Gail Bowen | Canadian playwright and writer (Joanne Kilbourn) | June 25 | 83 | Cancer | |
| Eriamel | French comic book writer | June 25 | 73 | | |
| David B. Danbom | American historian and author | June 26 | 79 | | |
| Věra Linhartová | Czech writer and art historian | June 26 | 88 | | |
| Alexei Bueno | Brazilian poet | June 27 | 63 | Complications from cancer | |
| Eeva Kilpi | Finnish writer | June 27 | 98 | | |
| Margaret Britton Vaughn | American poet | June 27 | 87 | | |
| Justin Richards | British writer (Doctor Who, The Invisible Detective) | June 28 | 64 | | |
| Egil Ulateig | Norwegian writer | June 28 | 80 | | |
| Joël Raguénès | French novelist | June 29 | 84 | | |
| Aitana Alberti León | Argentine-Cuban writer | June 30 | 84 | | |
| Puviarasu | Indian poet | June 30 | 96 | | |
| Akiko Hayashi | Japanese illustrator (Kiki's Delivery Service) | July 1 | 81 | | |
| Lam Wing-kee | Hong Kong bookseller and political activist, founder of Causeway Bay Books | July 2 | 70 | Lung cancer | |
| Shahrnush Parsipur | Iranian writer and translator | July 3 | 80 | | |
| Linda McCarriston | American poet | July 5 | 82 | | |
| Mike Wallace | American historian and author (Greater Gotham) | July 5 | 83 | Complications from Lewy body dementia | |
| Frida Vogels | Dutch writer | July 6 | 96 | | |
| Lucienne Stassaert | Belgian poet | July 8 | 90 | | |
| Jean-Louis Lechat | Belgian journalist and comic book writer. | July 9 | 83 | | |
| Ahmet Telli | Turkish poet | July 10 | 79 | | |
| Yahiya Emerick | American author and scholar | July 11 | 55 | | |
| Edward Lucie-Smith | Jamaican-born English writer, poet and art critic (Censoring the Body, British Poetry since 1945). | July 11 | 93 | | |
| Luis Goytisolo | Spanish novelist, member of the Royal Spanish Academy | July 12 | 91 | | |
| Poomani | Indian novelist (Agnaadi) and poet | July 12 | 79 | | |
| Chris Scheuer | Austrian comic book author and illustrator | July 12 | 73 | | |
| Gita Upadhyay | Indian writer and translator | July 12 | 87 | | |
| Jameson Currier | American writer | July 13 | 70 | | |
| Barry Dickins | Australian author, artist and actor | July 13 | 76 | | |
| Israel Pincas | Bulgarian-born Israeli poet | July 19 | 91 | | |
| Morley Torgov | Canadian novelist and humorist | July 19 | 98 | | |
| K. D. Miller | Canadian novelist and short story writer | September 14 | 75 | Cancer | |

== Awards ==
| Award | Category | Author | Title | Ref. |
|---|---|---|---|---|
| Anisfield-Wolf Book Award | Fiction | Carrie R. Moore | Make Your Way Home | |
| Anisfield-Wolf Book Award | Poetry | Gbenga Adesina | Death Does Not End at the Sea | |
| Anisfield-Wolf Book Award | Memoir/Autobiography | Sarah Aziza | The Hollow Half: A Memoir of Bodies and Borders | |
| Anisfield-Wolf Book Award | Nonfiction | Bench Ansfield | Born in Flames: The Business of Arson and the Remaking of the American City | |
| Aspen Words Literary Prize | | Maria Reva | Endling | |
| Astrid Lindgren Memorial Award | | Jon Klassen | | |
| BC and Yukon Book Prizes | Bill Duthie Booksellers' Choice Award | Liz Hammond-Kaarremaa, ed. | The Teachings of Mutton: A Coast Salish Woolly Dog | |
| BC and Yukon Book Prizes | Christie Harris Illustrated Children's Literature Prize | Samantha Beynon, Carla Joseph | Celebrating Potlatches | |
| BC and Yukon Book Prizes | Dorothy Livesay Poetry Prize | Amber Dawn | Buzzkill Clamshell | |
| BC and Yukon Book Prizes | Ethel Wilson Fiction Prize | Maria Reva | Endling | |
| BC and Yukon Book Prizes | Hubert Evans Non-Fiction Prize | Julian Brave NoiseCat | We Survived the Night: An Indigenous Reckoning | |
| BC and Yukon Book Prizes | Jim Deva Prize for Writing that Provokes | L. E. Fox | This Book Is a Knife: Radical Working-Class Strategies in the Age of Climate Change | |
| BC and Yukon Book Prizes | Roderick Haig-Brown Regional Prize | Paul Wong, Tamio Wakayama | Enemy Alien: Tamio Wakayama | |
| BC and Yukon Book Prizes | Sheila A. Egoff Children's Literature Prize | Léa Taranto | A Drop in the Ocean | |
| BC and Yukon Book Prizes | Borealis Prize: The Commissioner of Yukon Award for Literary Contribution | Dan Dowhal | | |
| BC and Yukon Book Prizes | Lieutenant Governor's Award for Literary Excellence | Tom Wayman | | |
| British Book Awards | Overall Book of the Year | Virginia Roberts Giuffre, with Amy Wallace | Nobody's Girl | |
| British Book Awards | Author of the Year | A. F. Steadman | | |
| British Book Awards | Illustrator of the Year | Dave Pilkey | | |
| British Book Awards | Fiction | Philippa Gregory | Boleyn Traitor | |
| British Book Awards | Crime & Thriller | Sally Smith | A Case of Mice and Murder | |
| British Book Awards | Debut Fiction | Florence Knapp | The Names | |
| British Book Awards | Romantic Fiction | Emily Henry | Great Big Beautiful Life | |
| British Book Awards | Science Fiction & Fantasy | SenLinYu | Alchemised | |
| British Book Awards | Graphic Novel | Jamie Smart | Bunny vs Monkey: Intergalactic Monkey Business! | |
| British Book Awards | Non-Fiction: Narrative | Virginia Roberts Giuffre, with Amy Wallace | Nobody's Girl | |
| British Book Awards | Non-Fiction: Lifestyle & Illustrated | Luke Sherlock, illus. by Ioana Pioaru | Forgotten Churches | |
| British Book Awards | Discover | Marcia Hutchinson | The Mercy Step | |
| British Book Awards | Children's Fiction | Suzanne Collins | Sunrise on the Reaping | |
| British Book Awards | Children's Non-Fiction & Illustrated | Michael Rosen, illus. by Helen Oxenbury | Oh Dear, Look What I Got! | |
| British Book Awards | Audiobook Fiction | Oyinkan Braithwaite, narrated by Weruche Opia, Diana Yekinni, and Nnei Opia Clark | Cursed Daughters | |
| British Book Awards | Audiobook Non-Fiction | Sarah Wynn-Williams | Careless People | |
| British Book Awards | Freedom to Publish | Virginia Roberts Giuffre, with Amy Wallace | Nobody's Girl | |
| British Book Awards | Freedom to Publish | Sarah Wynn-Williams | Careless People | |
| Booker Prize | | M. John Harrison | The End of Everything | |
| Carol Shields Prize for Fiction | | Julia Elliott | Hellions | |
| Dublin Literary Award | | Ali Smith | Gliff | |
| Dylan Thomas Prize | | Sasha Debevec-McKenney | Joy is My Middle Name | |
| Edgar Awards | Robert L. Fish Memorial Award | Billie Kay Fern | "How It Happened" | |
| Edgar Awards | Lilian Jackson Braun Award | Gwen Florio | A Senior Citizen's Guide to Life on the Run | |
| Edgar Awards | G. P. Putnam's Sons Sue Grafton Memorial Award | Joanna Schaffhausen | Gone in the Night | |
| Edgar Awards | Grand Master Award | Donna Andrews | | |
| Edgar Awards | Grand Master Award | Lee Child | | |
| Edgar Awards | Raven Award | Book Passage | | |
| Edgar Awards | Ellery Queen Award | John Scognamiglio, Kensington Books | | |
| Edgar Awards | Simon & Schuster Mary Higgins Clark Award | Hank Phillippi Ryan | All This Could Be Yours | |
| Edgar Awards | Best Novel | Robert Crais | The Big Empty | |
| Edgar Awards | Best First Novel by an American Author | Jakob Kerr | Dead Money | |
| Edgar Awards | Best Paperback Original | Vikki Wakefield | The Backwater | |
| Edgar Awards | Best Fact Crime | Caroline Fraser | Murderland: Crime and Bloodlust in the Time of Serial Killers | |
| Edgar Awards | Best Critical/Biographical | Richard Kopley | Edgar Allan Poe: A Life | |
| Edgar Awards | Best Short Story | Dave Zeltserman | "Julius Katz Draws a Straight Flush" | |
| Edgar Awards | Best Juvenile | Tiffany D. Jackson | Blood in the Water | |
| Edgar Awards | Best Young Adult | Libba Bray | Under the Same Stars | |
| Giller Prize | | Nicholas Herring | Your Breath in Charcoal | |
| Gotham Book Prize | | Lisa Ko | I Regret Almost Everything by Keith McNally | |
| Governor General's Awards | English Fiction | Kate Cayley | Property | |
| Governor General's Awards | English Non-Fiction | Trina Moyles | Black Bear: A Story of Siblinghood and Survival | |
| Governor General's Awards | English Poetry | Gillian Sze | An Orange, a Syllable | |
| Governor General's Awards | English Drama | Jordan Tannahill | Prince Faggot | |
| Governor General's Awards | English Children's Literature | Kristy Jackson | Touching Grass | |
| Governor General's Awards | English Children's Illustration | Matthew Forsythe | Aggie and the Ghost | |
| Governor General's Awards | French to English Translation | Katia Grubisic | Together by the Sea | |
| Governor General's Awards | French Fiction | Alex Thibodeau | Comme les éclipses | |
| Governor General's Awards | French Non-Fiction | Dalie Giroux | Penser croche | |
| Governor General's Awards | French Poetry | Vincent Lambert | Le Royaume des chuchotements | |
| Governor General's Awards | French Drama | Hoda Adra | L'histoire de comment je me suis séparée en deux | |
| Governor General's Awards | French Children's literature | Maude Ménard-Dunn | Comment convaincre un fantôme de déménager | |
| Governor General's Awards | French Children's illustration | Orbie | À l'enVERRE | |
| Governor General's Awards | English to French translation | Catherine Ego | La saignée. Enquête sur l’endométriose et la misogynie médicale ordinaire | |
| International Booker Prize | | Yáng Shuāng-zǐ, trans. by Lin King | Taiwan Travelogue (臺灣漫遊錄) | |
| J. Anthony Lukas Book Prize | | Jeff Hobbs | Seeking Shelter: A Working Mother, Her Children, and a Story of Homelessness in America | |
| J. Anthony Lukas Work-in-Progress Award | | danah boyd | Data Are Made, Not Found: A Story of Politics, Power, and the Civil Servants Who Saved the U.S. Census | |
| J. Anthony Lukas Work-in-Progress Award | | Karim Zidan | In the Shadow of the Cage | |
| Kobo Emerging Writer Prize | Fiction | Marc Bendavid | The Sapling | |
| Kobo Emerging Writer Prize | Speculative Fiction | Marcus Kliewer | We Used to Live Here | |
| Kobo Emerging Writer Prize | Nonfiction | Lyse Doucet | A People's History of Afghanistan | |
| Lambda Literary Awards | Bisexual Fiction | Demree McGhee | Sympathy for Wild Girls | |
| Lambda Literary Awards | Bisexual Nonfiction | Lidia Yuknavitch | Reading the Waves | |
| Lambda Literary Awards | Bisexual Poetry | Anna Swanson | The Garbage Poems | |
| Lambda Literary Awards | Gay Fiction | Charlie Porter | Nova Scotia House | |
| Lambda Literary Awards | Gay Memoir/ Biography | Thomas Dai | TAKE MY NAME BUT SAY IT SLOW: ESSAYS | |
| Lambda Literary Awards | Gay Poetry | Ben Kline | It Was Never Supposed To Be | |
| Lambda Literary Awards | Gay Romance | Timothy Janovsky | A Mannequin for Christmas | |
| Lambda Literary Awards | Lesbian Fiction | Kat Dunn | Hungerstone | |
| Lambda Literary Awards | Lesbian Memoir/ Biography | Mary Frances Phillips | Black Panther Woman: The Political and Spiritual Life of Ericka Huggins | |
| Lambda Literary Awards | Lesbian Poetry | Bianca Rae Messinger | Pleasureis Amiracle | |
| Lambda Literary Awards | Lesbian Romance | Alexandra Vasti | Ladies in Hating | |
| Lambda Literary Awards | LGBTQ Anthology | Paul Martineau and Ryan Linkof (eds.) | Queer Lens: A History of Photography | |
| Lambda Literary Awards | LGBTQ Children's | Jerrold Connors | JIM! Six True Stories about One Great Artist: James Marshall | |
| Lambda Literary Awards | LGBTQ Comics | Mike Curato | Gaysians | |
| Lambda Literary Awards | LGBTQ Drama | Jordan E. Cooper | Ain't No Mo' | |
| Lambda Literary Awards | LGBTQ Romance and Erotica | TJ Alexander | A Gentleman's Gentleman | |
| Lambda Literary Awards | LGBTQ Middle Grade | Rainie Oet | Glitch Girl! | |
| Lambda Literary Awards | LGBTQ Mystery | Robert Holtom | A Queer Case | |
| Lambda Literary Awards | LGBTQ Nonfiction | Gaar Adams | Guest Privileges: Queer Lives and Finding Home in the Middle East | |
| Lambda Literary Awards | LGBTQ Poetry | jason b. crawford | Yeet! | |
| Lambda Literary Awards | LGBTQ Speculative Fiction | Ilana Masad | Beings | |
| Lambda Literary Awards | LGBTQ Studies | Sarah Ensor | Queer Lasting: Ecologies of Care for a Dying World | |
| Lambda Literary Awards | LGBTQ Young Adult | Riley Redgate | Come Home to My Heart | |
| Lambda Literary Awards | Transgender Fiction | Milo Todd | The Lilac People | |
| Lambda Literary Awards | Transgender Nonfiction | Jennifer Finney Boylan | Cleavage: Men, Women, and the Space Between Us | |
| Lambda Literary Awards | Transgender Poetry | Roque Raquel Salas Rivera | Algarabía – The Song of Cenex, Natural Son of the Isle Alarabíyya | |
| Mark Lynton History Prize | | William Dalrymple | The Golden Road: How Ancient India Transformed the World | |
| Nobel Prize in Literature | | Anne Carson | | |
| PEN/Faulkner Award for Fiction | | Mahreen Sohail | Small Scale Sinners | |
| PEN/Hemingway Award for Debut Novel | | Virginia Evans | The Correspondent | |
| Publishing Triangle Awards | Audre Lorde Award | Achy Obejas | The Boy Kingdom / El reino de los varones | |
| Publishing Triangle Awards | Edmund White Award | Stephanie Wambugu | Lonely Crowds | |
| Publishing Triangle Awards | Ferro-Grumley Award | Scott Alexander Hess | Drought | |
| Publishing Triangle Awards | Jacqueline Woodson Award | H. E. Edgmon | We Can Never Leave | |
| Publishing Triangle Awards | Joseph Hansen Award | Lev A. C. Rosen | Mirage City | |
| Publishing Triangle Awards | Judy Grahn Award | Sam Tabet | Beyond the Lesbian Vampire | |
| Publishing Triangle Awards | Leslie Feinberg Award | Jzl Jmz | Local Woman | |
| Publishing Triangle Awards | Randy Shilts Award | Nicholas Boggs | Baldwin: A Love Story | |
| Publishing Triangle Awards | Thom Gunn Award | Richard Siken | I Do Know Some Things | |
| Pulitzer Prize | Biography | Amanda Vaill | Pride and Pleasure: The Schuyler Sisters in an Age of Revolution | |
| Pulitzer Prize | Drama | Bess Wohl | Liberation | |
| Pulitzer Prize | Fiction | Daniel Kraus | Angel Down | |
| Pulitzer Prize | General Nonfiction | Brian Goldstone | There Is No Place for Us: Working and Homeless in America | |
| Pulitzer Prize | History | Jill Lepore | We the People: A History of the U.S. Constitution | |
| Pulitzer Prize | Memoir or Autobiography | Yiyun Li | Things in Nature Merely Grow | |
| Pulitzer Prize | Poetry | Juliana Spahr | Ars Poeticas | |
| Purdy Poetry Prize | | Tom Wayman | Out of the Ordinary | |
| Stephen Leacock Memorial Medal for Humour | | Meredith Hambrock | She's a Lamb! | |
| Story Prize | | André Alexis | Other Worlds | |
| Whiting Award | Fiction | Elaine Castillo | | |
| Whiting Award | Fiction | Hilary Leichter | | |
| Whiting Award | Fiction | Lara Mimosa Montes | | |
| Whiting Award | Drama | Celine Song | | |
| Whiting Award | Non-fiction | Negar Azimi | | |
| Whiting Award | Non-fiction | Karen Hao | | |
| Whiting Award | Non-fiction | Carvell Wallace | | |
| Whiting Award | Poetry | Hajar Hussaini | | |
| Whiting Award | Poetry | Brittany Rodgers | | |
| Whiting Award | Poetry | Alison C. Rollins | | |
| Windham–Campbell Literature Prizes | Drama | Christina Anderson | | |
| Windham–Campbell Literature Prizes | Drama | S. Shakthidharan | | |
| Windham–Campbell Literature Prizes | Fiction | Gwendoline Riley | | |
| Windham–Campbell Literature Prizes | Fiction | Adam Ehrlich Sachs | | |
| Windham–Campbell Literature Prizes | Non-fiction | Kei Miller | | |
| Windham–Campbell Literature Prizes | Non-fiction | Lucy Sante | | |
| Windham–Campbell Literature Prizes | Poetry | Joyelle McSweeney | | |
| Windham–Campbell Literature Prizes | Poetry | Karen Solie | | |
| Writers' Trust of Canada | Atwood Gibson Writers' Trust Fiction Prize | Zak Jones | Fancy Gap | |
| Writers' Trust of Canada | Hilary Weston Writers' Trust Prize for Nonfiction | Robert Moor | In Trees | |
| Writers' Trust of Canada | Dayne Ogilvie Prize | Misha Solomon | My Great-Grandfather Danced Ballet | |
| Writers' Trust of Canada | Latner Griffin Writers' Trust Poetry Prize | Margaret Christakos | | |
| Writers' Trust of Canada | Matt Cohen Award | Maria Campbell | | |
| Writers' Trust of Canada | Vicky Metcalf Award for Literature for Young People | Cherie Dimaline | | |
| Writers' Trust of Canada | Writers' Trust Engel/Findley Award | Shaena Lambert | | |
| Writers' Trust of Canada | Nancy Flight Prize for Nonfiction Editing | Rachel Rose | Humanitarienne: A Doctor’s Stories from the Conflict Zone (Kirsten Johnson) | |
| Writers' Trust of Canada | Shaughnessy Cohen Prize for Political Writing | Maggie Helwig | Encampment: Resistance, Grace, and an Unhoused Community | |
| Writers' Trust of Canada | Balsillie Prize for Public Policy | TBA November 24 | | |
| Writers' Trust of Canada | RBC Bronwen Wallace Award for Emerging Writers, Poetry | Renato Gandia | Psalmody for the Estranged | |
| Writers' Trust of Canada | RBC Bronwen Wallace Award for Emerging Writers, Short Fiction | Julia Cottrelle | The Old Turtle Climb | |
| Writers' Trust of Canada | RBC Bronwen Wallace Award for Emerging Writers, Creative Non-fiction | Graham Slaughter | The Perfect Home for Your Child | |
