= Barsotti =

Barsotti is an Italian surname. Notable people with the surname include:

- Alberto Barsotti (born 1964), Italian athlete
- Carlo Barsotti (1850–1927), American businessman
- Charles Barsotti (1933–2014), American cartoonist
- Dino Barsotti (1903–1985), Italian rower
- Frank Barsotti (1937–2012), American photographer
- Glaudi Barsotti (1934–2026), French Occitan writer and journalist
- Iacopo Barsotti (1921–1987), Italian mathematician
- Leandro Barsotti (born 1963), Italian singer-songwriter
