= Brink: Inside the Race to Free the October 7th Hostages =

2026 nonfiction book by Brett McGurk

- Cover of the 2026 Random House edition
- Author: Brett McGurk
- Publication date: October 6, 2026

Brink: Inside the Race to Free the October 7th Hostages is a 2026 nonfiction book by Brett McGurk, who served as National Security Council Coordinator for the Middle East and North Africa under the Biden administration. The book describes McGurk's efforts to negotiate the release of hostages including American citizens held by Hamas following the October 7 attacks.

The book describes an interaction between president Joe Biden and Israeli Prime Minister Benjamin Netanyahu where Biden "nearly" cut off the US flow of arms to Israel.

== Reception ==
Fintan O’Toole wrote a critical review of Brink in The New York Times, writing, "Although McGurk does not intend it as such, “Brink” becomes a grim case study of learned helplessness." A review of the New York Times coverage of the book noted that Yahya Sinwar, the architect of the attacks, was released from an Israeli prison in 2011 as part of a prisoner swap for a soldier. Sinwar may have believed that the October 7 attacks would secure power and protection for Hamas. The word “race” in the book’s subtitle is misleading, as it actually took two years to free the hostages, highlighting a story marked by frustration and despair. Meetings between President Biden and Israeli Prime Minister Netanyahu showed little attention to the hostages, with Netanyahu focusing mainly on military matters. McGurk points out a general lack of U.S. interest in the Palestinian issue before the attacks.

Despite the horrors in Gaza, Biden’s behavior appeared to show unwavering backing for Netanyahu, demonstrated by his trip to Israel shortly after Hamas’s attacks. McGurk believed this visit did not exert meaningful influence on Israel’s military operations. The U.S. seems to be a passive observer, unable to effectively prevent civilian casualties and lacking a clear plan to resolve the conflict. By April 2024, Biden’s administration was split over how to end the war, and internal disorder, combined with the possibility of Trump regaining power, made the situation even more complex.
