= Veronika Valentová =

Czech writer and translator (1974–2026)

- Born: 21 January 1974; Prague, Czechoslovakia
- Died: 19 May 2026 (aged 52)
- Education: Charles University
- Occupations: Writer, translator
- Writing career
- Genres: Children's literature, Young adult literature, Novel
- Notable work: Zmatení jazyků aneb Bruselský cestopis (2006)

Veronika Valentová (21 January 1974 – 19 May 2026) was a Czech writer and translator.

== Background ==
Valentová was born in Prague on 21 January 1974. She studied languages and literature at Charles University in Prague, as well as at universities in Nice, Aix-en-Provence, and Paris. She lived in France from 1996 and, starting in 2004, worked as a translator at the European Economic and Social Committee in Brussels. She died suddenly on 19 May 2026, at the age of 52.

== Literary work ==
Valentová wrote primarily for young people and their parents. Her books include Karlík Nezbedník – Knížka pro tvrdohlavé děti a jejich zoufalé rodiče (2017), Meteorit z Mušlovky (2022), and Tajný pramen z Hůrky (2025). She also published the novels Zmatení jazyků aneb Bruselský cestopis (2006) and Nicka dobývá Ameriku (2012).
