= Gregorio Morán =

Spanish journalist and writer (1947–2026)

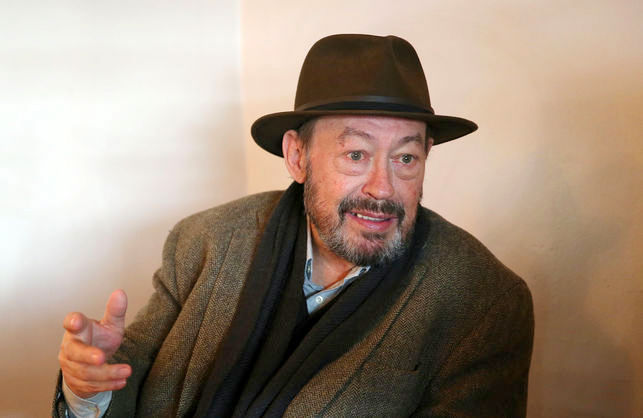
- Morán in 2017
- Born: Gregorio Morán Suárez; 1947; Oviedo, Spain
- Died: 22 February 2026 (aged 79)
- Education: University of Paris
- Occupations: Journalist, writer

Gregorio Morán Suárez (1947 – 22 February 2026) was a Spanish journalist and writer.

== Life and career ==
During the Franco regime, Morán lived in Paris and returned to Spain during the transition to democracy. He worked as a journalist for La Vanguardia, Crónica Global, and Vozpópuli. In 2014, his book El Cura y los mandarines was published. Historia no oficial del bosque de los letrados. Cultura y política en España (1962–1996) was rejected by publisher Grupo Planeta over the censorship of certain passages about Víctor García de la Concha. The book was ultimately published by Ediciones Akal.

Morán died on 22 February 2026, at the age of 79.

== Works ==
- Adolfo Suárez : historia de una ambición (1979)
- Los españoles que dejaron de serlo : Euskadi, 1937-1981 (1982)
- Miseria y grandeza del Partido Comunista de España 1939-1985 (1986)
- Testamento vasco : un ensayo de interpretación (1987)
- El precio de la transición (1991)
- Nunca llegaré a Santiago (1996)
- El maestro en el erial : Ortega y Gasset y la cultura del franquismo (1998)
- Llueve a cántaros (1999)
- El viaje ruso de un vendedor de helados (2001)
- Los españoles que dejaron de serlo : cómo y por qué Euskadi se ha convertido en la gran herida histórica de España (2003)
- Asombro y búsqueda de Rafael Barrett (2007)
- Adolfo Suárez : ambición y destino (2009)
- La decadencia de Cataluña contada por un charnego (2013)
- El cura y los mandarines (2014)
- Memoria personal de Cataluña (2019)
