= John R. Reed =

American academic and writer (1938–2026)

- Born: John Robert Reed; January 24, 1938; Duluth, Minnesota, U.S.
- Died: April 16, 2026 (aged 88)
- Education: University of Minnesota Duluth; University of Rochester
- Occupations: Academic, writer
- Spouse: Ruth Yzenbaard (died. 1999)

John Robert Reed (January 24, 1938 – April 16, 2026) was an American academic and writer.

== Life and career ==
Reed was born in Duluth, Minnesota, the son of John Sr. and Josephine Reed. He attended the University of Minnesota Duluth, earning his BA degree in English and music in 1959. He also attended the University of Rochester, earning his PhD degree in 1963. After earning his degrees, he worked as a Leverhulme fellow at the University of Warwick from 1966 to 1967.

Reed served as an assistant professor in the department of English at the University of Connecticut from 1964 to 1965. He then served as a professor in the same department at Wayne State University from 1965 to 2017. During his years as a professor, in 1990, he was named a distinguished professor.

== Personal life and death ==
Reed was married to Ruth Yzenbaard. Their marriage lasted until Yzenbaard's death in 1999. In 2002, he wrote Dear Ruth, a memorial book dedicated to Yzenbaard.

Reed died on April 16, 2026, at the age of 88.
