= Honey in the Wound =

Novel by Jiyoung Han

- Author: Jiyoung Han
- Genre: Historical fiction
- Publisher: Avid Reader Press
- Publication date: April 7, 2026
- Pages: 320
- ISBN: 978-1-66820-216-6

Honey in the Wound is a 2026 debut novel by Jiyoung Han, published by Avid Reader Press.

== Synopsis ==
The novel follows a Korean family during the Japanese occupation of Korea, in particular the girl Young-Ja, who makes food and takes part in resistance alongside Korean rebel fighters.

== Critical reception ==
Publishers Weekly gave the novel a starred review, calling it "remarkable" and praising how Han "blends folklore and magical realism with Korean history." The reviewer ultimately concluded that "Han brilliantly immerses readers in her birth country's history and offers a testament to women's strength in the face of brutality. It's a knockout." Kirkus Reviews wrote that Han "incorporated extensive research into a revelatory work of harrowing fiction" that "validates the hidden powers of 'powerless' women."

BookPage called the novel "a moving demonstration of the way that individual acts of resistance can preserve memories and stories that challenge the legacies of empire and colonization."
