= Musa Akhmadov =

Chechen playwright and writer (1956–2026)

- Муса Ахмадов
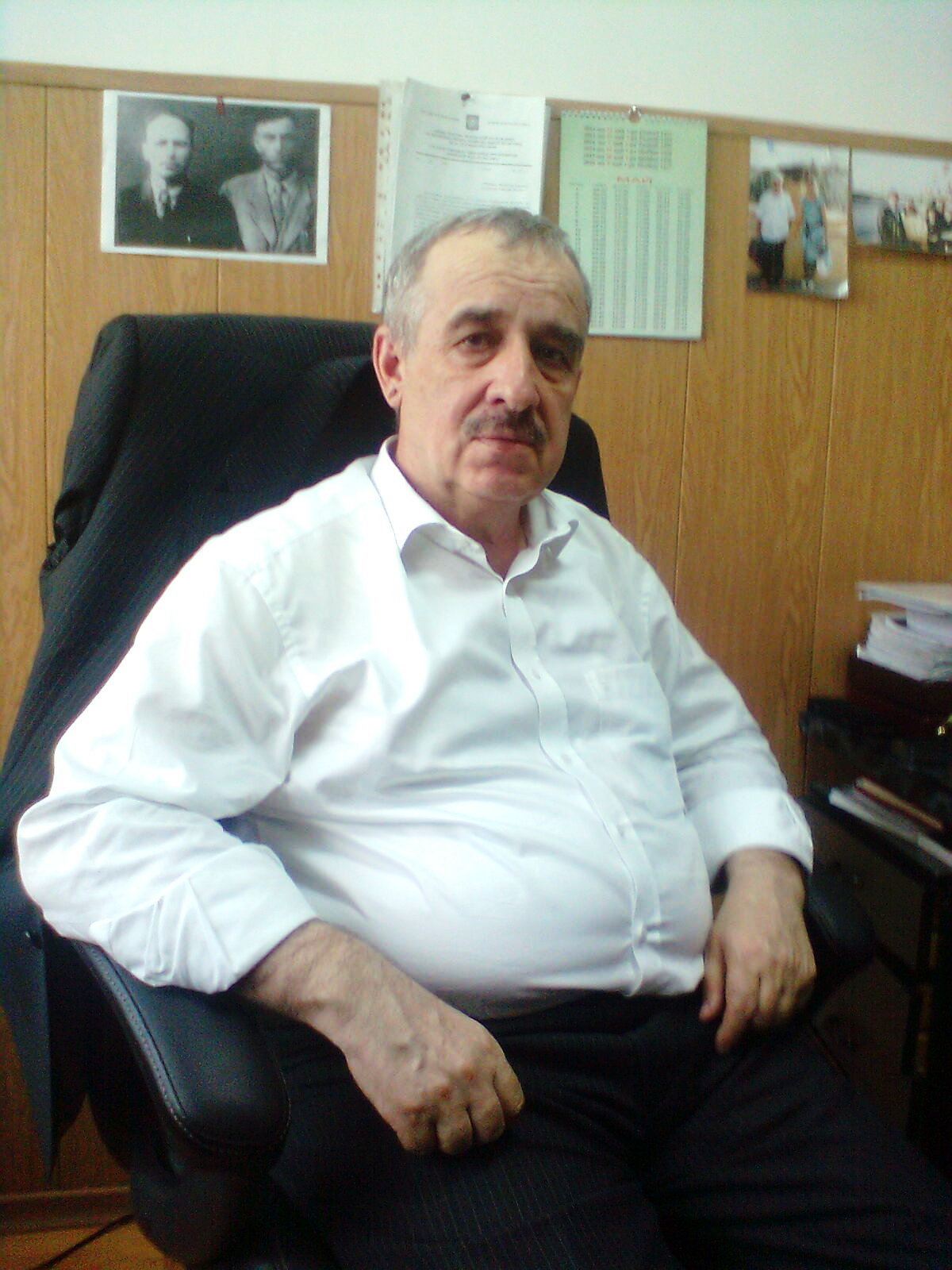
- Akhmadov in 2014.
- Born: 28 January 1956; Kirghiz SSR, USSR
- Died: 23 April 2026 (aged 70)
- Occupations: Playwright, poet, novelist, short story writer, editor

Musa Akhmadov (Chechen: Муса Ахмадов, Russian: Муса Магомедович Ахмадов; 28 January 1956 – 23 April 2026) was a Chechen playwright, poet, novelist, short story writer and magazine editor. He was also a member of PEN International's Chechen PEN Centre. Born in 1956 in Kirghiz SSR, he graduated from the University of Grozny and later edited a magazine called Vaynah. He died on 23 April 2026, at age 70.
