= Joël Raguénès =

French novelist (1941–2026)

- Raguénès in 2024
- Born: 17 December 1941; Le Conquet, German-occupied France
- Died: 29 June 2026 (aged 84); Brest, France
- Occupation: Novelist

Joël Raguénès (17 December 1941 – 29 June 2026) was a French novelist. He was best known for writing the 2002 novel Le Pain de la mer. Le Télégramme reviewed his novel as "a classic of contemporary Breton literature".

Raguénès died in Brest on 29 June 2026, at the age of 84.
