= The Infamous Gilberts =

2026 novel by Angela Tomaski

- Author: Angela Tomaski
- Publisher: Scribner
- Publication date: 20 January 2026
- Pages: 288
- ISBN: 978-1-668-09464-8

The Infamous Gilberts is a 2026 novel by British author Angela Tomaski.

== Publication history ==
In an interview with NPR, Tomaski stated that the novel was in part inspired by the Victorian gothic revival country house Tyntesfield in southern England, saying that "I went on a tour of that house just after it was acquired by the National Trust. The - sort of the last owner had died there. And I saw the bed in which the sort of reclusive last baron was said to have died, and it was such a powerful sort of scene. I remember the smell of a little tablet of coal tar soap and a pair of slippers under the bed. And when I went back on a tour later, the bed had been removed. The soap, the slippers - everything had gone, and that vivid link to the past, obviously, was lost."

== Critical reception ==
"An impeccable book" was the reaction of Ella Rishbridger in a review in The Guardian, London, describing it as a "pitch-perfect debut". Sadie Stein of The New York Times also gave the book a positive review, saying that it was "oddly diverting" and comparing it to the works of Wes Anderson, while noting that "Your enjoyment of “The Infamous Gilberts,” a story of the decline, fall and further fall of the eponymous homeowners, will depend heavily upon your ability to tolerate the rather intrusive docent mentioned above, one Maximus, whose own story is teased over the course of the book." Kirkus Reviews wrote that "this distinctive debut introduces a wickedly weird new talent," saying that "if Shirley Jackson moved The Addams Family to the English countryside, something like this dark, tongue-in-cheek epic might result." Joyce Sparrow of the Library Journal wrote that the "sad, sometimes funny debut novel thrives on its personalities... Recommended for fans of big English novels about people who cannot help themselves."

Chris Hewitt of The Minnesota Star Tribune gave the novel a more mixed review, saying that "there may be more style than substance in “The Infamous Gilberts” but it is very stylish, indeed."
