= Josep Piera =

Spanish poet and author (1947–2026)

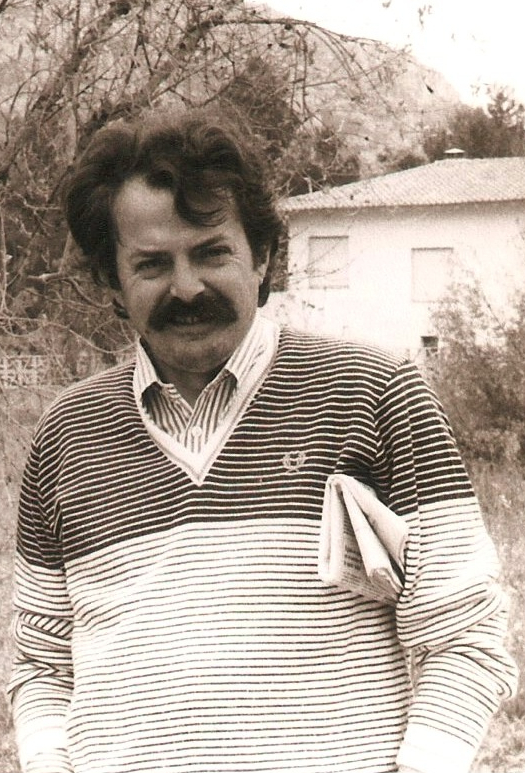
- Piera in 1980
- Born: Josep Piera i Rubio; 30 May 1947; Beniopa, Province of Valencia, Spain
- Died: 5 April 2026 (aged 78); Gandia, Spain
- Occupations: Poet; Author

Josep Piera i Rubio (30 May 1947 – 5 April 2026) was a Spanish poet and author.

== Life and career ==
Born in Beniopa on 30 May 1947, Piera studied teaching and made his poetry debut in the collective work Carn fresca. He rose to prominence as a key member of the Generació dels 70 in Catalan literature. In 1972, he married Marifé Arroyo, a leader in Valencian teaching. In 2002, he published Jo sóc aquest que em dic Ausiàs March, the first biography written about Ausiàs March. He was the subject of a 2008 monographic issue in the journal L'Aiguadolç. He was a recipient of the Josep Pla Award in 1981 and the Premi d'Honor de les Lletres Catalanes in 2023. He was also honored by the Acadèmia Valenciana de la Llengua in 2011.

Piera died in Gandia on 5 April 2026, at the age of 78.
