= Sneeze: The History and Science of the Common Cold =

2026 book by David Miles about the common cold virus

- Cover art for the book Sneeze
- Author: David Miles
- Language: English
- Subject: Virology, Medical science, medical history
- Publisher: August Books
- Publication date: March 16, 2026 (Canada and USA - April 28, 2026)
- Media type: Print (hardcover, audiobook and Kindle)
- Pages: 352
- ISBN: 979-8217253272
- Preceded by: How Vaccines Work: The Science and History Behind Every Question You've Wanted to Ask

Sneeze: The History and Science of the Common Cold is a 2026 book by British infectious disease immunologist David Miles. This book examines the history of the cold virus, myths about it, and how best to combat the spread. The book is written for the lay audience and does not include an index. This book was published by August Books, and it was released March 16, 2026, everywhere but Canada and the US, where it was released April 28, 2026.

== Synopsis ==
The book is organized in three parts: virus natural history and evolution, evolution of technology for virus discovery, treatment and avoidance, and finally, the stories of the people involved.

Miles includes his definition of the common cold as, "an illness caused by a virus that infects the upper respiratory tract and, in most cases, clears up within a matter of days or possibly weeks without requiring medical intervention." He includes SARS-CoV-2 (the virus that causes COVID-19) in this definition.

The book also includes the history of research into colds, trials (where people were paid to catch a cold), as well as a history of the Common Cold Unit, which the British Medical Research Council "operated out of Harvard Hospital on Harnham Down in Salisbury" from 1946 to 1990 and which produced over 1,000 published papers. "The main thing I want to achieve with this book", according to Miles, "is to demystify the common cold and help people understand it."

In an interview with Skeptic Zone podcast host Adrienne Hill, Miles explained that they have found a cold virus in the teeth of infant males from over 30,000 years ago. But Miles claims that it wasn't until humans left the hunter gatherer stage and started farming and congregating around a larger variety of people did the cold virus become what we now know as the common cold. This means that the cold probably only started ten to fifteen thousand years ago. Hill asked Miles about the myth that dressing warmly will keep away the cold. Miles responded that there is some truth in that myth; the virus symptoms may exacerbate when a person is cold, and though they will still have the cold virus, they will feel the symptoms less when they are warmer.

Miles explained several of the more memorable remedies he learned during his research, one being the two-hat method. Apparently going back to the 1700s, people with colds were told to hang their hat on the bedstead and go to bed with alcohol, drink until you see two hats, then you will start to feel better. Another piece of history Miles learned was that President Calvin Coolidge suffered a miserable cold, put himself in a gas chamber and had it flooded with chlorine gas. He claimed he felt better, but Miles thinks that he said that only to save face. Miles states that this became a fad and products claiming to be a chlorine killer cold bomb were marketed. "Please don't use chlorine to cure a cold, it will not work and it might do real harm", according to Miles, "It was the same stuff they used in chemical weapons during WWI."

After all of his research, he tells Hill, the best practices of dealing with the common cold are to treat the symptoms "with painkillers and decongestants, which do work - they don't reduce the duration of the cold, but they will make you less miserable while you've got it." Get plenty of sleep so that you will be better able to function the next day.

== Background ==
Miles spent ten years traveling Africa and learning about infectious diseases. He returned to Britain and realized that there was a lot of confusion about infectious diseases. He wanted to understand the history of the research that had been done to understand the common cold, and the people involved in that research.

== Reception ==
Reviewer for Microbiology Australia Ross Barnard writes that this book would be a good addition to "both secondary and tertiary levels, and one would hope that its evidence-based approach will have some influence on future decisions about epidemic management and building design." He calls Miles' writing style, entertaining with a "wry humour", but though the book is aimed at the lay person, it lacks an index which if included would transform "this otherwise excellent book into an indispensable reference work ... for the practicing microbiologist, virologist and teacher."

Science writer Brian Clegg reviewing Sneeze for Popular Science wasn't happy with Miles's definition of the common cold, believing that SARS and COVID should not be included. Miles contends that every cold has the possibility of leading to "some sort of serious illness". Besides this point, Clegg claims that "this isn't a bad book" and he was very interested in Miles's question of how far back does the cold go in human history asking, "'When did the first person catch the first cold?'" Clegg writes "This might not have been the book I was expecting, but it didn't stop it from being an engaging biological journey into the life and times of these irritating and sometimes deadly viruses."

Isaac Maddock writing for the Salisbury Journal focused on Miles's research on the Salisbury Common Cold Unit. Notably, according to Miles, it is "widely thought that the first coronavirus was discovered at the CCU." Maddock thinks that Sneeze is a good book for understanding the history of the Unit.
