= Sculpter l'éternité =

2026 comic book by Xavier Coste

- Page count: 208 pages
- Publisher: Rue de Sèvres

Creative team
- Creator: Xavier Coste

Original publication
- Date of publication: 15 April 2026
- Language: French
- ISBN: 9782810210619

Sculpter l'éternité. Rodin face à Michel-Ange (lit. 'Sculpt the Eternity: Rodin against Michelangelo') is a 2026 French comic book by Xavier Coste. It is a biography about the French sculptor Auguste Rodin, focusing on his inner life and his creative process through his engagement with the works of Michelangelo.

The album came to be through a collaboration between Coste and the Louvre, and was made to coincide with an joint exhibition of Rodin's and Michelangelo's works at the museum. It is 208 pages long and was published by Rue de Sèvres on 15 April 2026.
