= Roberto Zapperi =

Italian art historian (1932–2026)

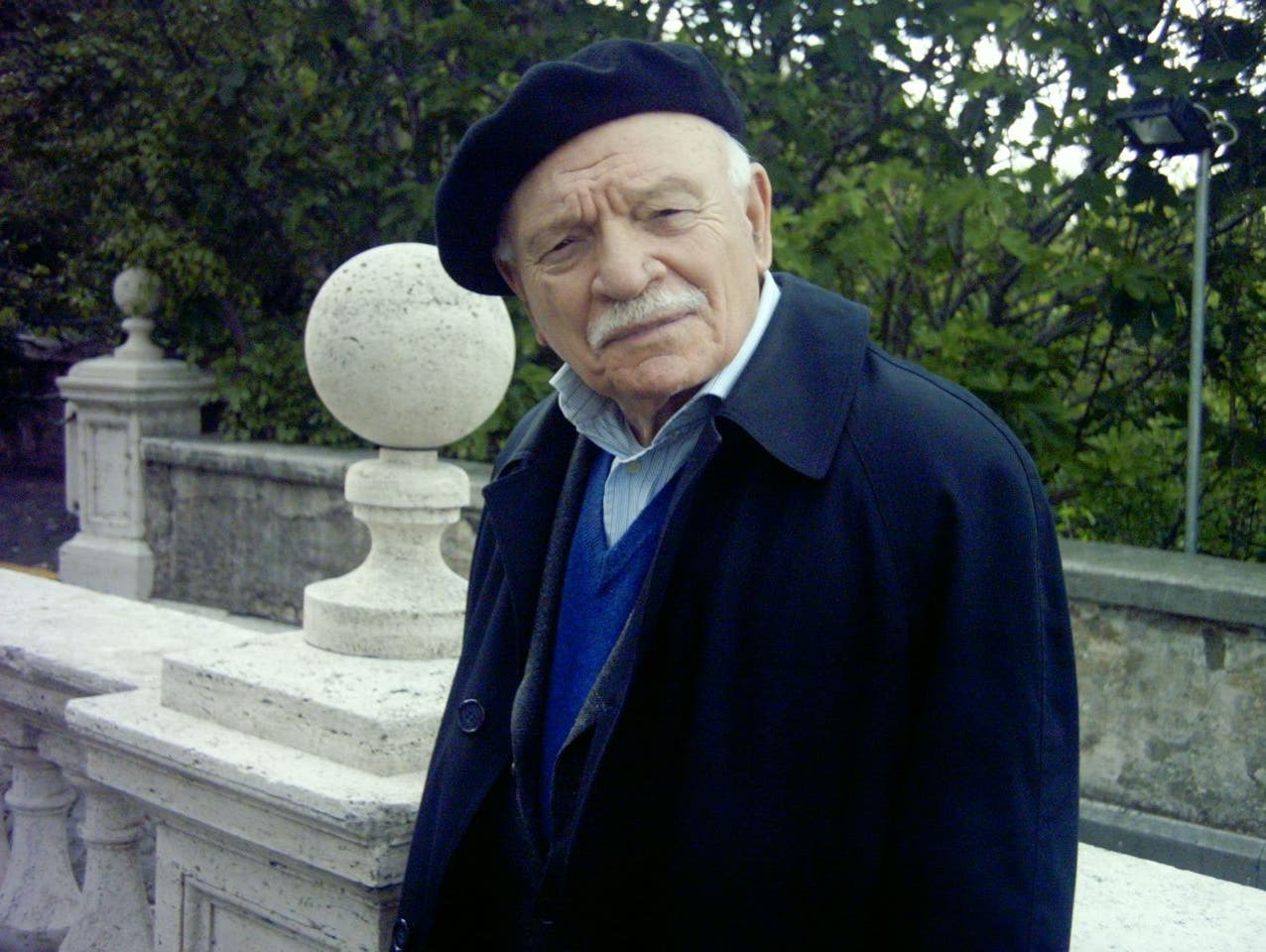
- Zapperi in 2020
- Born: 20 January 1932; Catania, Italy
- Died: 4 April 2026 (aged 94); Rome, Italy
- Education: Berlin Institute for Advanced Study
- Occupation: Art historian

Roberto Zapperi (20 January 1932 – 4 April 2026) was an Italian art historian and writer.

Zapperi received a fellowship from the Fondazione Luigi Einaudi and the Berlin Institute for Advanced Study before becoming a professor in Hamburg. He was also a member of the Deutsche Akademie für Sprache und Dichtung.

Zapperi died in Rome on 4 April 2026, at the age of 94.

== Works ==
- Annibale Carracci. Ritratto di artista da giovane (1989)
- Tiziano, Paolo III e i suoi nipoti (1990)
- Eros e controriforma. Preistoria della galleria Farnese (1994)
- La leggenda del papa Paolo III. Arte e censura nell'Europa pontificia (1998)
- Una vita in incognito. Goethe a Roma (2000)
- Il selvaggio gentiluomo. L'incredibile storia di Pedro Gonzales e dei suoi figli (2005)
- Il ritratto dell'amata. Storie d'amore da Petrarca a Tiziano (2006)
- Monna Lisa Addio, La vera storia della Gioconda (2012)
