= May Angeli =

French artist and author (1937–2026)

- Born: 8 August 1937; Clichy, France
- Died: 11 April 2026 (aged 88)
- Education: École nationale supérieure des arts appliqués et des métiers d'art
- Occupations: Artist, author

May Angeli (French: [mˈɛ ɑ̃ʒlˈi]; 8 August 1937 – 11 April 2026) was a French visual artist and author.

A graduate of the École nationale supérieure des arts appliqués et des métiers d'art, she spent her entire career in Paris. She notably collaborated with Sylvie Baussier to create illustrations in the 2002 collective work Petite histoire des langues, for which she received the Prix Octogne, awarded by the Centre international d'études en littérature de jeunesse. In 2013, she received the Grand Prix d'illustration from the Musée de l’illustration jeunesse. In spring 2021, she received the Coup de cœur Jeune Public from the Académie Charles Cros.

Angeli died on 11 April 2026, at the age of 88.
