= Gloria Wade-Gayles =

African-American writer (1937–2026)

- Born: Gloria Jean Wade; July 1, 1937; Memphis, Tennessee, U.S.
- Died: January 27, 2026 (aged 88)
- Education: LeMoyne College (BA); Boston University (MA); Emory University (PhD)
- Occupations: Academic, author
- Awards: Woodrow Wilson Fellow at Boston University

Gloria Wade-Gayles (née Gloria Jean Wade; July 1, 1937 – January 27, 2026) was an American educator and author. She was a Professor for Comparative Women's Studies at Spelman College, and the founding director of the SIS Oral History Project and RESONANCE choral performance group at Spelman.

== Life and career ==
Gloria Jean Wade was born in Memphis, Tennessee, in the Jim Crow South. She grew up in a low-income neighborhood with her mother Bertha, grandmother Nola Ginger Reese, sister, aunt, and three uncles. Her father lived in Chicago and made annual trips to be together. Her mother fostered a love of literature and reading, and encouraged her daughters to excel in school.

She attended LeMoyne College in 1955, which was the only college that would accept Black students, with a full scholarship. She earned her BA degree in English in 1959, graduating cum laude with distinction, and earned her master's degree from Boston University as a Woodrow Wilson Fellow. She was an active member of the Boston Committee on Racial Equity (CORE). She continued to work for civil rights, and was arrested for participating in peaceful demonstrations. She taught at Spelman College for one year in 1963, but was dismissed for her outspoken activism. She then taught at Howard University in Washington, D.C.

In 1967, she married Joseph Nathan Gayles. The family returned to Atlanta to raise their two children.

Wade-Gayles earned her doctoral degree in American Studies from Emory University in 1981. In 1983, she was an assistant professor at Talladega College and won the 2nd Annual Pilgrim Press National Manuscript Competition. She returned to Spelman College the same year and became a tenured faculty member.

Wade-Gayles died on January 27, 2026, at the age of 88.

== Recognition and awards ==
- 1991: CASE Professor of Teaching Excellence for the state of Georgia
- 1994: Emory Medal for outstanding scholarship and service as alumna of Emory University
- Eminent Scholar's Chair in Independent Scholarship and Service Learning at Spelman College.

== Published works ==
- Gayles, G. J. W. (1991). Anointed to Fly. Harlem River Press. ISBN 9780863163043
- Gayles, G. J. W. (1993). Pushed Back to Strength: a Black woman's journey home. Beacon Press. ISBN 9780807009222
- Gayles, G. J. W. (1995). My Soul is a Witness: African-American women’s spirituality. Beacon Press. ISBN 9780807009345
- Gayles, G. J. W. (1996). Rooted Against the Wind: personal essays. Beacon Press. ISBN 9780807009383
- Gayles, G. J. W. (1997). No Crystal Stair: visions of race and gender in Black women’s fiction (Rev. and updated). Pilgrim Press. ISBN 9780829811513
- Gayles, G. J. W. (1997). Father Songs: testimonies by African-American sons and daughters. Beacon Press. ISBN 9780807062142
- Gayles, G. J. W. (2003). In Praise of Our Teachers: a multicultural tribute to those who inspired us. Beacon Press. ISBN 9780807031483
