= Scott Alexander Hess =

American writer and actor

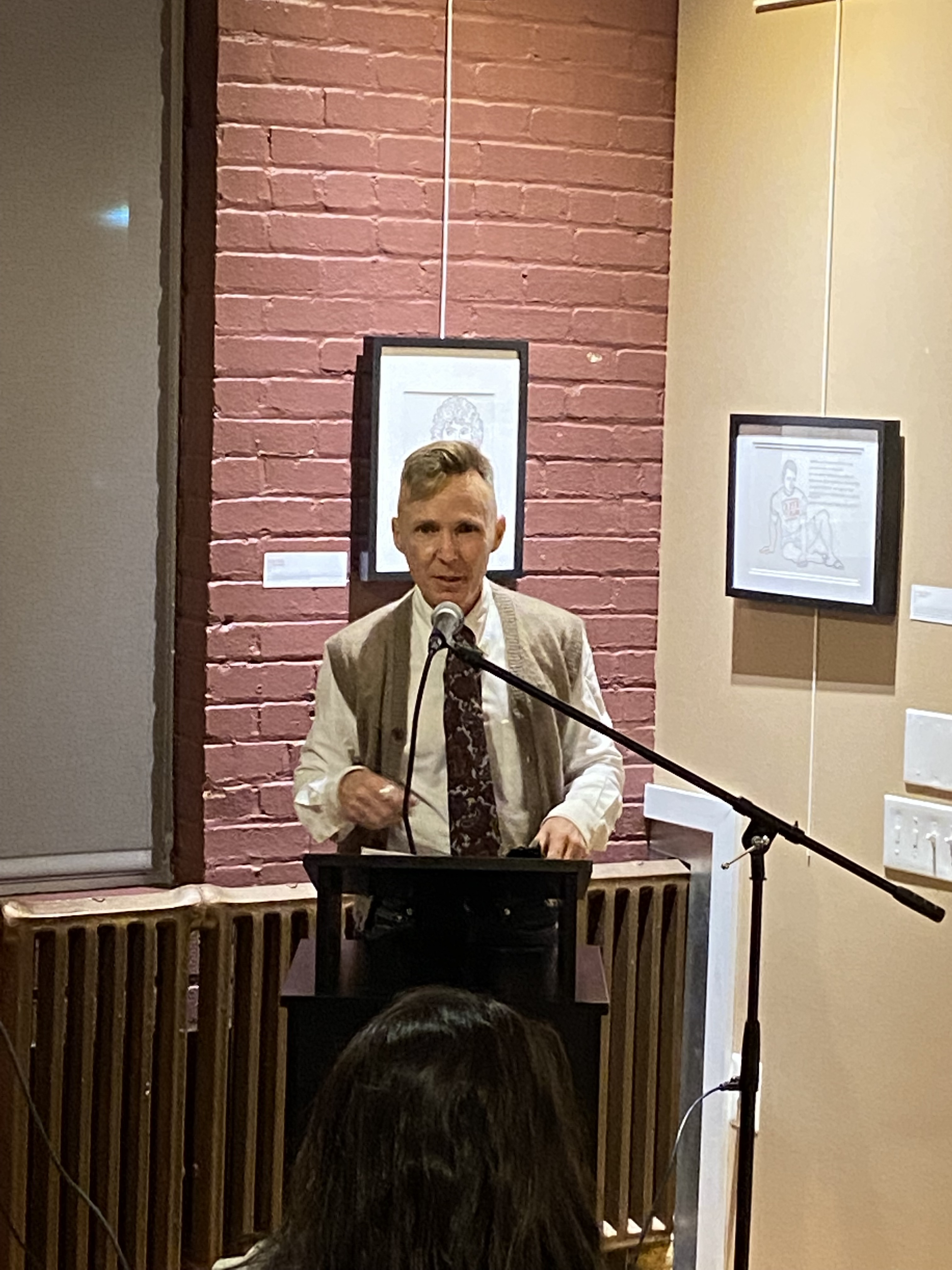
- Scott Alexander Hess reading at the Bradbury-Sullivan LGBTQ Community Center
- Occupation: Writer

Scott Alexander Hess is an American writer and actor. According to the Riverfront Times of St. Louis, Missouri, Hess is known for his "evocative" works centered on gay relationships.

== Early life ==
Hess is a native of St. Louis, Missouri, and he graduated from Affton High School.

== Career ==
Hess acted in Mark Dendy's play "Dream Analysis" in 1998 and in a solo show B.J.: The Trail of a Transgendered Country Singing Star, which won the Jury Prize for Outstanding Solo Performance at the 1999 New York International Fringe Festival.

His debut novel, Diary of a Sex Addict, was translated to German in 2012. Another novel, The Butchers Sons, was selected in Kirkus Reviews Best Books of 2015. It follows three Irish brothers in 1930s who become embroiled in the New York criminal underworld. His novel Skyscraper (2016) was a finalist for a Lambda Literary Award for LGBTQ erotica.

His novella The River Runs Red (2019) explores class, race, sexuality and greed in late 19th century St. Louis, Missouri. Kirkus Reviews found it to be a "lyrical, gritty" work with a "compelling" protagonist. Another pair of novellas, The Root of Everything and Lightning, were selected as best books of 2021 on St. Louis Public Radio chosen by St. Louis Librarians. They focus on three generations of family as they arrive in and move across America. Writing in the St. Louis Post-Dispatch, Dale Singer felt the first story (The Root of Everything), a "generational saga", moved too quickly, while the second story (Lightning) was more "self-contained" and better suited to the novella format. His 2023 novella A Season in Delhi follows a couple experiencing issues in their relationship while working abroad in Delhi, India, inspired by his own experiences visiting the country with his husband as an out gay couple. Kirkus Reviews thought the work was engaging despite flaws such as a "contrived" plot.

Hess was also a cowriter of the film Tom in America, an official selection of the Montreal World Film Festival 2014 and the Palm Springs International Film Festival 2014.
