= Curzia Ferrari =

Italian writer (1929–2026)

- Born: May 1929; Milan, Italy
- Died: 8 March 2026 (aged 96); Milan, Italy
- Occupations: Journalist, writer, translator

Curzia Ferrari (May 1929 – 8 March 2026) was an Italian journalist, writer and translator of Russian poetry. She died in Milan on 8 March 2026, at the age of 96.
