= Freedom of Money =

Memoir by Binance founder Changpeng Zhao

Freedom of Money: A Memoir of Protecting Users, Resilience, and the Founding of Binance
- Author: Changpeng Zhao
- Language: English; Chinese
- Genre: Memoir
- Published: 2026
- Publisher: Self-published
- Media type: Print; e-book
- Pages: 364

Freedom of Money: A Memoir of Protecting Users, Resilience, and the Founding of Binance is a 2026 memoir by Changpeng Zhao, founder of the cryptocurrency exchange Binance.

The book presents Zhao’s account of building Binance into the world’s largest cryptocurrency exchange and describes the company’s legal challenges with United States authorities.

== History ==
According to a draft of the memoir reviewed by The New York Times, Zhao describes negotiations with United States prosecutors in 2023, during which they sought a $6.8 billion penalty and accused him of money laundering and terrorist financing. The draft also states that Zhao pleaded guilty to a single count of violating an anti-money-laundering statute and was sentenced in 2024 to four months in prison. The book also describes Zhao’s personal trajectory, including his early life, entry into finance and technology, and the development of Binance into the world’s largest cryptocurrency exchange.
