= Murder Bimbo =

2026 novel by Rebecca Novak

- First edition cover
- Author: Rebecca Novack
- Publisher: Avid Reader Press
- Publication date: February 10, 2026
- ISBN: 978-1-668-15120-4

Murder Bimbo is a 2026 satirical novel by Rebecca Novack. It was published by Avid Reader Press on February 10, 2026.

== Plot overview ==
Murder Bimbo is a 32-year-old sex worker who, after killing a right-wing politician nicknamed Meat Neck, presents three different narratives of the events leading to the assassination.

== Development ==
Murder Bimbo was Novack's sixth attempt at writing a novel. Novack, a former priesthood candidate in the Episcopal Church, had worked in publishing prior to writing the book. In an interview with CBC News, she claimed that the book's structure was based on a nightmare that she had.

=== Publication history ===
The novel was published in the United States by Avid Reader Press on February 10, 2026. Shortly after marketing for the novel was originally planned to begin, the assassination of Charlie Kirk caused the publisher to place a temporary hold on all promotional events due to similarities between the novel's plot and the real-world events.

== Reception ==
Murder Bimbo received mixed reception upon release. Publishers Weekly was positive, complimenting the plot but noting that the characters were "sometimes thinly drawn." The New York Times was also positive, writing that Novack "has a great ear for the inanities of contemporary language." By contrast, Kirkus Reviews panned the book, describing the narrative as "fractured" and arguing that the plot was "beyond the reach of the ordinary reader."
