= Dmitry Bavilsky =

Russian writer (1969–2026)

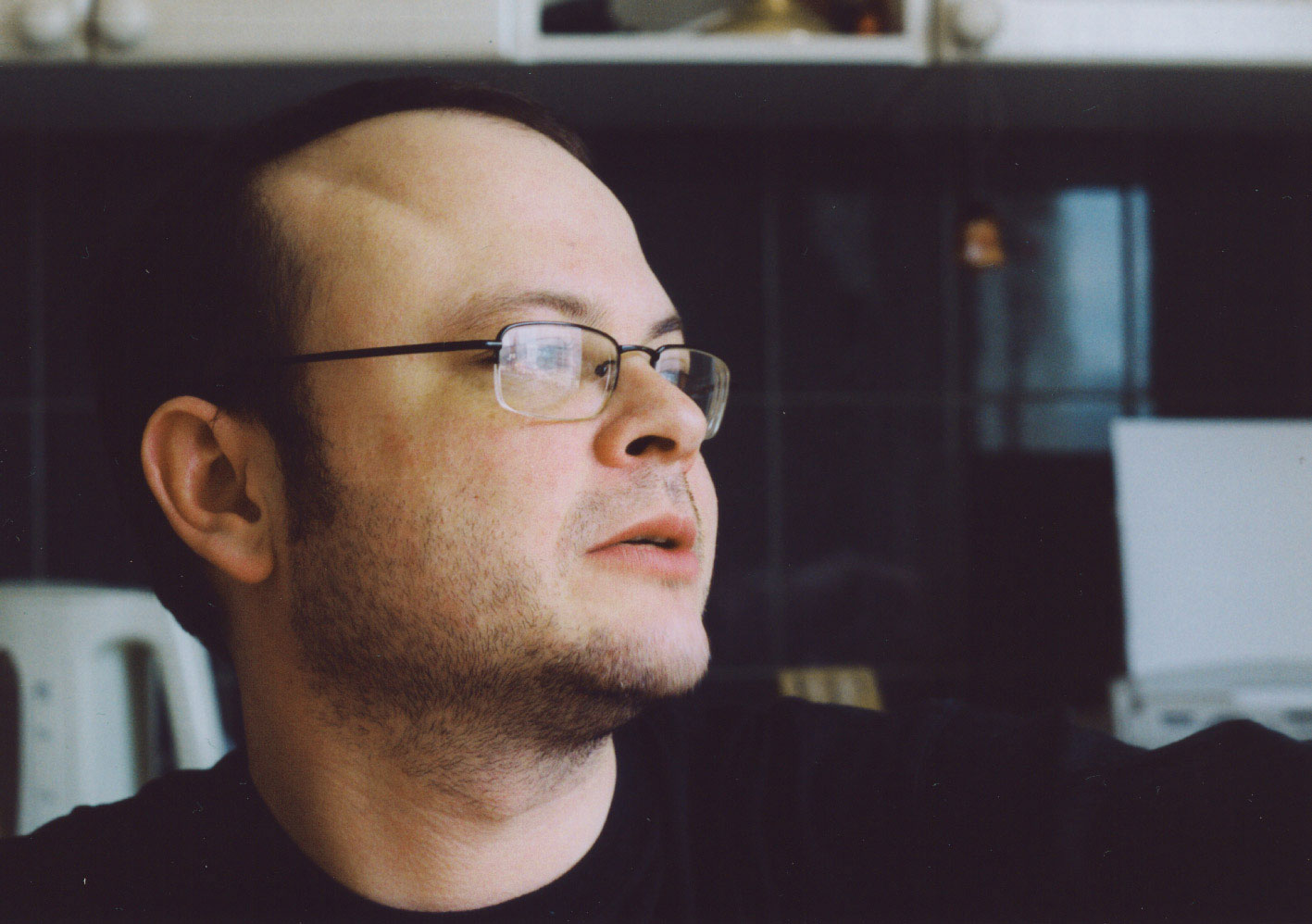
Bavilsky in 2004

Dmitry Vladimirovich Bavilsky (Russian: Дмитрий Владимирович Бавильский; 19 January 1969 – 17 February 2026) was a Russian writer, literary critic, and journalist. Some of the novels he wrote, included The Library of Babel, The Nightshade Family, The Potato Eaters, Gagarin's Last Love, and The Red Dot.

== Early life ==
Bavilsky was born in Chelyabinsk on 19 January 1969. Both his father Vladimir Favelyevich and mother Nina Vasilyevna were doctors. He graduated from Chelyabinsk State University in 1993. He continued post-graduate studies in foreign literature under Mark Iosifovich Bent at the same university, which he completed in 1996.

== Career ==
Bavilsky was working as a deputy editor-in-chief of the magazine Uralskaya Nov from 1995 to 1999. He also worked as a supervisor at the Chelyabinsk Academic Theatre of Drama, and headed Vzglyad publications. His articles appeared in Literaturnaya Gazeta and Nezavisimaya Gazeta; as well as in magazines including Znamya, Oktyabr, and Ural. He was a private correspondent and editor for the Russian edition of The Art Newspaper from 2014 to 2017, and for Topos from 2001 to 2012.

== Death ==
Bavilsky died at a hospital on 17 February 2026, at the age of 57.
