= Manu Lann Huel =

French singer-songwriter and poet (1949–2026)

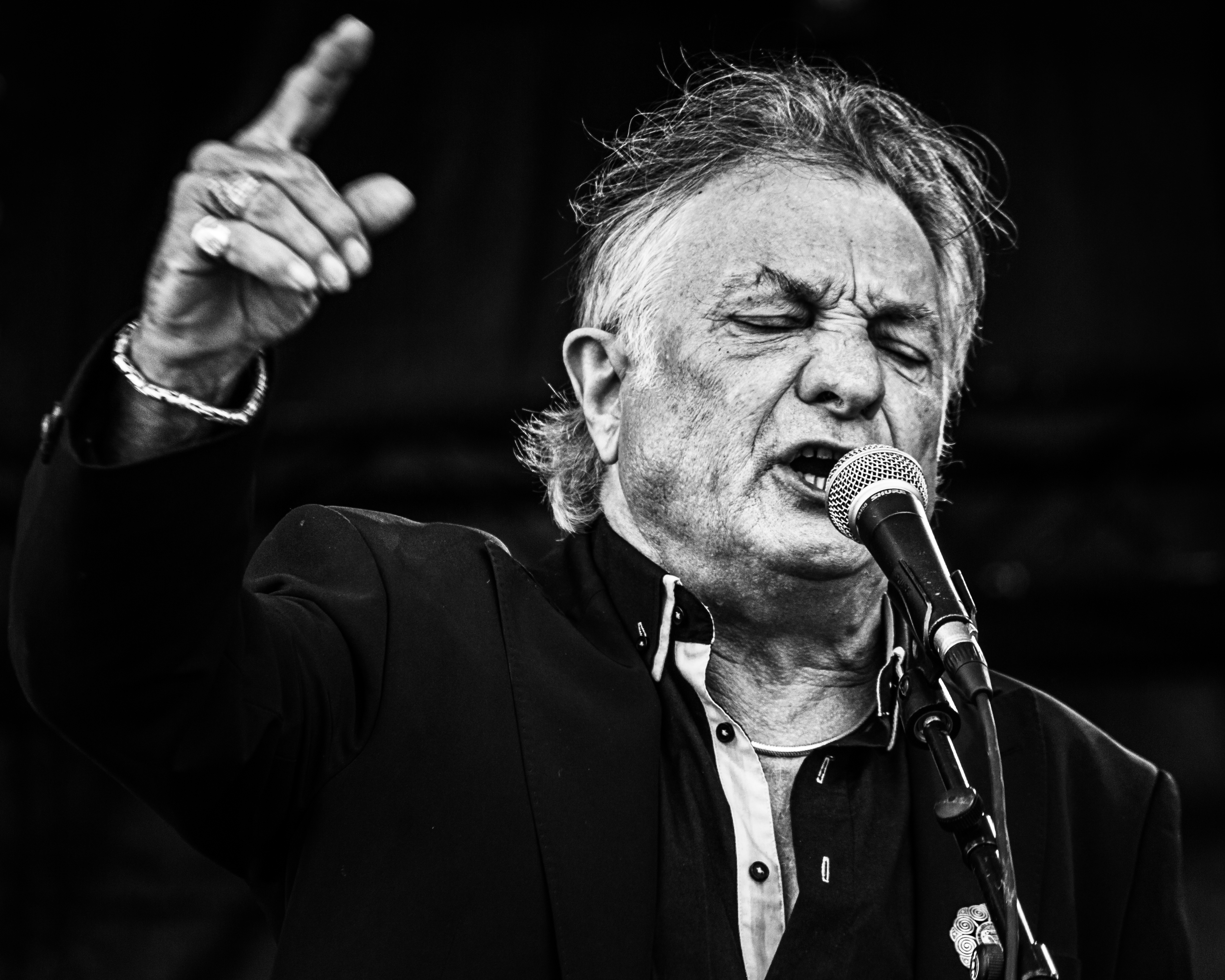
- Lann Huel in 2016

Personal details
- Born: 1949 Le Juch, France
- Died: 10 June 2026 (aged 77)
- Education: University of Western Brittany
- Occupation: Singer-songwriter, poet

Manu Lann Huel (French: [manˈy lˈan yˈɛl]; 1949 – 10 June 2026) was a Breton singer-songwriter and poet.

== Life and career ==
After his studies at the faculty of medicine of the University of Western Brittany, Lann Huel became drawn to traditional Breton musical instruments and released his first album in 1977, titled Passant par les champs, le long de la rivière. In 1984, he released the album La fleur rouge, in which he sings in both French and Breton. For his 1998 album titled Ile Elle, he collaborated with the likes of Didier Squiban, Ronan Le Bars, Gilles Le Bigot, and Dominique Molard. In 2003, he paid tribute to one of his mentors, Léo Ferré, for the album Chante Léo Ferré. In 2011, he released Chansons d'orgueil, which featured trumpeter Éric Le Lann and paid tribute to Pêr-Jakez Helias.

Manu Lann Huel died on 10 June 2026, at the age of 77.

== Discography ==
- Passant par les champs le long de la rivière (1977)
- La fleur rouge (1987)
- Rue de la Rade (1992)
- Chante René-Guy Cadou (1993)
- Île-elle (1998)
- Chante Léo Ferré (2003)
- Un Rien De Temps (2016)
- Chansons d'orgueil (2024)
