= Kalin Terziyski =

Bulgarian poet and writer (1970–2026)

Kalin Terziyski Калин Терзийски
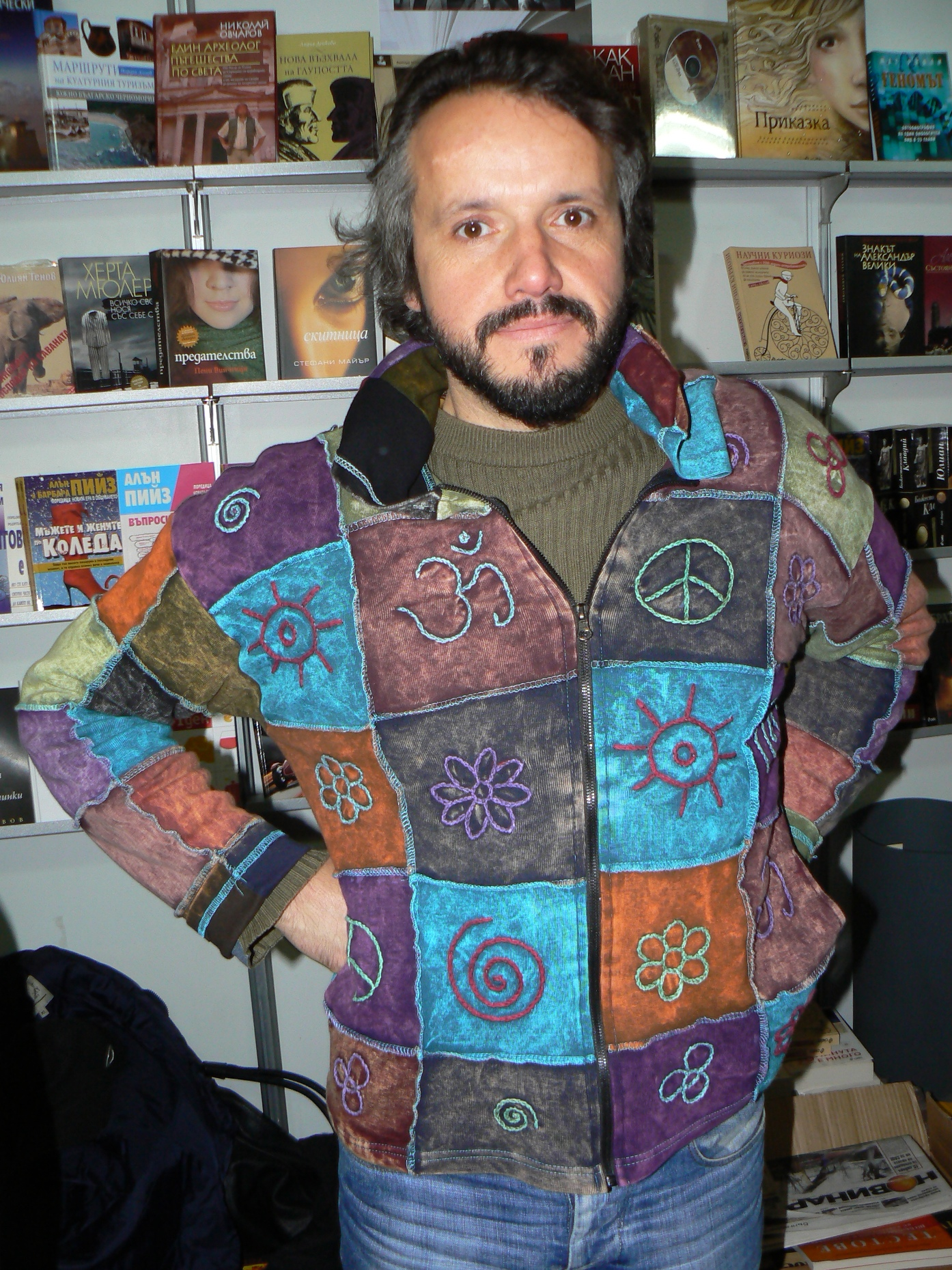
- Terziyski in 2010
- Born: 22 March 1970; Sofia, Bulgaria
- Died: 22 January 2026 (aged 55)
- Education: Sofia Medical University
- Occupation: Writer
- Writing career
- Language: Bulgarian
- Genres: Poetry and fiction
- Notable works: Is there anybody to love you (short stories), Alcohol (2010), Insanity (2011), Love of a 35 year old woman (short stories)
- Notable awards: European Union Prize for Literature (2011)
- Website: facebook.com/kalin.terziyski

Kalin Terziyski (Bulgarian: Калин Терзийски; 22 March 1970 – 22 January 2026) was a Bulgarian poet and writer.

== Life and career ==
Educated as a psychiatrist, out of necessity for additional income to supplement the low wages for young doctors in his homeland, Bulgaria, he started writing for newspapers and magazines. At the beginning of 2000, he forsook his medical career and devoted his creative time to writing.

Terziyski was one of the winners of the European Union Prize for Literature 2011.

Terziyski died on 22 January 2026, at the age of 55.

== Works ==
=== Poetry ===
- "Salt", Sofia, Paradox, 2008, 108 pages. The ISBN on Bulgarian bookstore sites (9789545530844) is formally wrong.
- "New poems at the very beginning", Sofia, Faber, 2010, 72 pages. ISBN 978-954-400-235-0
- "The advantages of posing", Sofia, Ciela, 2011, 96 pages, ISBN 9789542810230

=== Short stories ===
- "13 pieces of broken time", 2008 : There are only 100 pieces for the whole edition. Each book is separately illustrated by the author. Price 60 euro. Not available commercially.
- "Strict thoughts with strange dressing", Sofia, Ciela, 2009, 98 p. (ISBN 9789542804802)
- "Is there anybody to love you", Plovdiv, Janet 45, 2009, 160 p. (ISBN 9789544915544)
- "Love of a 35 year old woman", Plovdiv, Janet 45, 2010, 160 p. (ISBN 9789544916411)
- "There is a day for the good man", Plovdiv, Janet 45, 2011, 142 p. (ISBN 9789544917197)
- "Noah gives the last orders to the animals", Sofia, Ciela, 2012, 120 p. (ISBN 9789542810773)

=== Novels ===
- "Alcohol", Sofia, Ciela, 2010, 352 p. (ISBN 9789542807636)
- "Insanity", Sofia, Ciela, 2011, 240 p. (ISBN 9789542809449)
