= Young Man in a Hurry =

2026 book by Gavin Newsom

- Author: Gavin Newsom
- Audio read by: Gavin Newsom
- Language: English
- Subject: Memoir
- Publisher: Penguin (United States), The Bodley Head (UK and Ireland)
- Media type: Print and digital
- Pages: 304
- ISBN: 978-1984881939
- Website: www.youngmaninahurrybook.com

Young Man in a Hurry: A Memoir of Discovery is a memoir published in 2026 by governor of California Gavin Newsom. The book was published by Penguin in the United States and The Bodley Head in the United Kingdom and Ireland.

== Background ==
Ghostwritten by the journalist Mark Arax, the book was intended to be released in 2025 but was delayed due to the Los Angeles wildfires.

== Contents ==
In the book, Newsom tells of the history of his family stretching back to the earliest generations of his family that arrived in the United States. Newsom recalls how dyslexia has affected his studies. He also writes about his 55-year-old mother's death using assisted suicide following her treatment for breast cancer. Newsom writes about his relationship with his wife Jennifer Siebel, explaining that Siebel had a miscarriage in 2020 and elaborated on the surgery his wife went through. Newsom also writes about his former marriage to Kimberly Guilfoyle. He also writes about an affair with a staffer he had after divorcing Guilfoyle, expressing his regret over the incident.

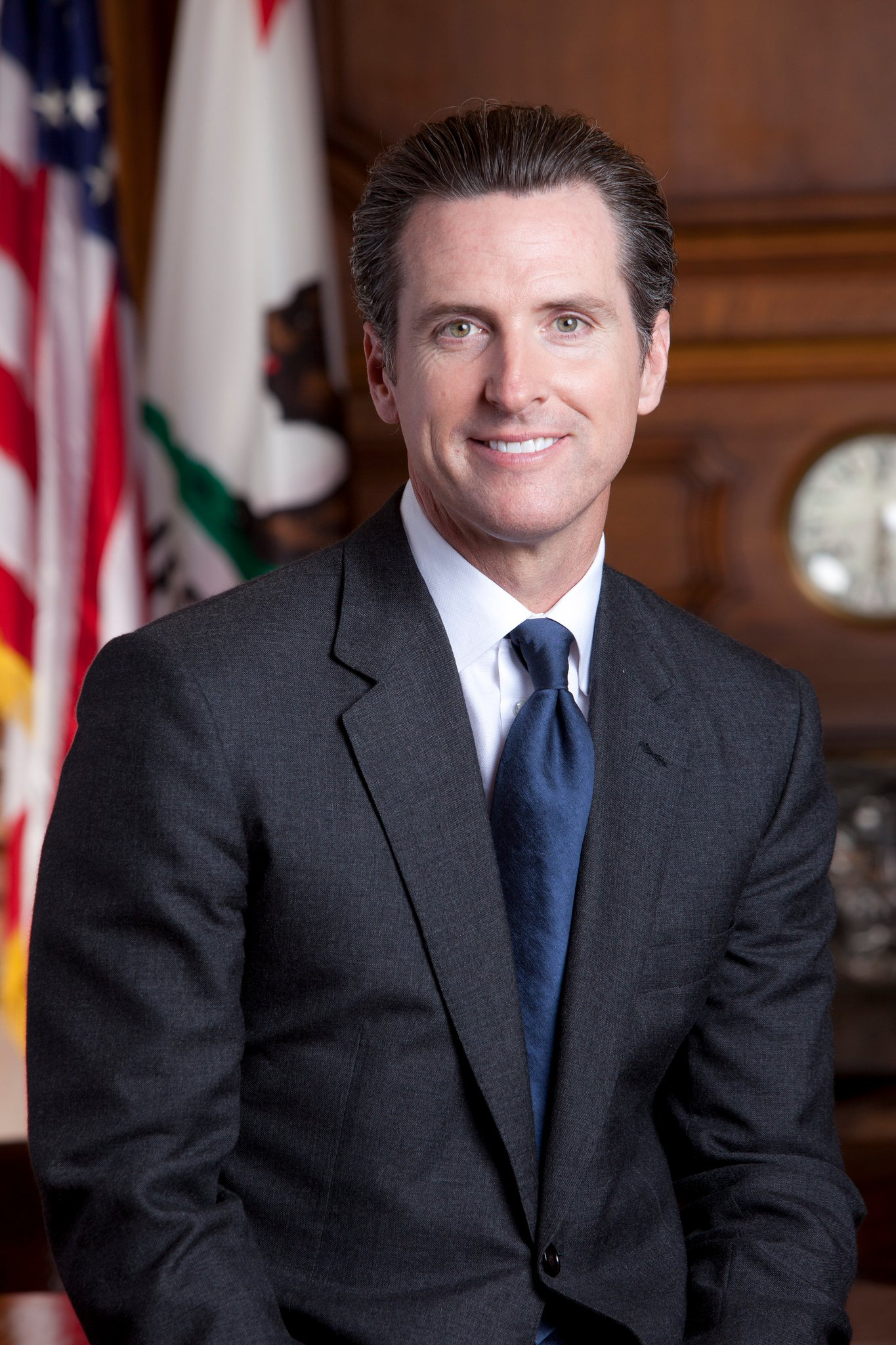
Official photo of Newsom as lieutenant governor in 2011

Newsom also writes about his push to legalize same-sex marriage in San Francisco when he was mayor before many other places in the United States. Newsom also writes about meeting giants of the technology industry such as Apple co-founder Steve Jobs, who presented a pre-release version of the iPhone when the two were with Google co-founders Sergey Brin and Larry Page at a party.

The book also touches on notable political moments, such as the Democratic Party distancing from Newsom's decision to certify same-sex marriages in San Francisco, accusations were levelled against Newsom that he damaged John Kerry's 2004 presidential campaign by members such as senator and Newsom's political mentor Dianne Feinstein, one of the first openly gay members of the House of Representatives Barney Frank who also accused Newsom of moving too quickly and damaging the broader gay rights cause, senator Barack Obama was similarly displeased.

The book reveals how Newsom has shifted his approach to dealing with Donald Trump, Newsom's thinking shifted, he says: "attacking Trump the personality, while it might do wonders for the gut, was a losing game" and that the Democrats should "focus on the issues", he goes on to say "Boy, was I wrong about that!"

The book also states that his father rarely showed love to Newsom, with one of his father's caretakers encouraging him to give Newsom some love on the night he was elected Governor but his father did not do so. The book also states that his mother said "It's OK to be average, Gavin" in relation to Newsom's undiagnosed dyslexia.

== Release ==
The book was released on digital platforms and in physical bookstores on February 24, 2026, in the United States and Canada, and in the United Kingdom and Ireland on March 3, 2026. It was released in Australia on March 10, 2026.

The book sparked speculation from news media outlets that he is preparing for a presidential run in 2028. In 2025, Politico called Newsom the front-runner for the Democratic presidential nomination in 2028. Following the book's release, Newsom embarked on a national tour to promote the book.

=== Sales ===
In the hours after the book released, it had reached the top of Amazon's political biography section and was one of the top-five bestselling memoirs.

== Best seller rankings and bulk purchase disclosures ==
Following its publication, the book debuted on several national bestseller lists, including The New York Times Best Seller list for Hardcover Nonfiction.

On the New York Times list, the entry was marked with a dagger symbol (†), a designation used by the publication when proprietary audit protocols indicate that a book's sales ranking has been influenced by institutional, organizational, or bulk purchases.

Federal Election Commission (FEC) filings disclosed in April 2026 showed that Newsom's federal political action committee, Campaign for Democracy, made payments totaling over $1.5 million to Porchlight Book Company, a bulk book distributor, to purchase approximately 67,000 copies of the memoir "at cost." According to industry sales trackers such as Circana BookScan, these committee-funded purchases accounted for roughly two-thirds of the approximately 97,400 total print copies sold nationwide during that period.

The PAC acquired the copies to fulfill a nationwide fundraising promotion launched in late 2025, which offered a copy of the memoir to donors contributing any monetary amount to the committee. Representatives for Newsom stated that the initiative was designed as a grassroots donor list-building and engagement effort rather than a commercial sales drive, noting that each copy was individually distributed to a contributor and that Newsom received no royalties from the PAC-funded purchases.

== Reception ==
Adam Nagourney of The New York Times stated that "I finished his memoir with a better understanding of why he often seems to be trying so hard, why he always seems to have one eye on the mirror — and why, over the years, he has engaged in the kind of self-destructive behavior that could be damaging for someone with presidential ambitions. In many ways, Newsom is still the kid with dyslexia who fabricated a bibliography so he could get a passing grade on a paper."

Zoe Strimpel for the British newspaper The Daily Telegraph awarded the book two stars out of five and wrote: "Admittedly, even that urge has obvious motives: to persuade people that he’s more than just San Francisco aristocracy and thereby enhance his obviously imminent bid for the Oval Office."
