= Georges Benrekassa =

French historian and literary critic (1932–2026)

- Born: 1932; Marseille, France
- Died: 19 April 2026 (aged 93–94)
- Education: University of Montpellier Paul Valéry (DND)
- Occupations: Literary critic, historian

Georges Benrekassa (French: [ʒˈɔʁʒ bɑ̃ʁkasˈa]; 1932 – 19 April 2026) was a French literary critic and historian.

A longtime professor at Paris Diderot University, he was known for specializing in the 18th century and particularly the works of Montesquieu.

Benrekassa died on 19 April 2026.

== Biography ==
Georges Benrekassa was born on September 7, 1932, in Marseille. After earning a bachelor’s and master’s degree in philosophy, he passed the agrégation exam in classical literature in 1959 and then defended his dissertation on the concept of historicity in the 18th century in 1980. He served as an assistant professor at the Sorbonne, then as an associate professor, and eventually became a full professor at Paris Diderot University.

Most of his work focuses on the thought and literature of the Age of Enlightenment.

He died on April 19, 2026 in Carpentras.

== Publications ==
- Le Concentrique et l'Excentrique : marges des Lumières (1980)
- La Politique et sa mémoire : le politique et l'historique dans la pensée des Lumières (1983)
- Fables de la personne : pour une histoire de la subjectivité (1985)
- Montesquieu, la liberté et l'histoire (1987)
- Le Langage des Lumières : concepts et savoir de la langue (1995)
- Les Manuscrits de Montesquieu : secrétaires, écritures, datations, in Cahiers Montesquieu (2005)
- L'Achèvement des Lumières : singularité, communauté, culture (2023)
