= The Frenzy (short story collection) =

2026 book by Joyce Carol Oates

- First edition cover
- Author: Joyce Carol Oates
- Language: English
- Genre: Short story collection
- Publisher: Hogarth Press
- Publication date: June 16, 2026
- Publication place: United States
- Media type: Print (hardcover)
- Pages: 336
- ISBN: 9780593978115
- OCLC: 1538494392

The Frenzy is a collection of short stories by Joyce Carol Oates, published in 2026 by Hogarth Press. It is her fiftieth short story collection.

== Stories ==
The Frenzy features nine short stories, and is divided into three parts, with three stories each. All were previously published, as indicated:

1.

- "The Frenzy" (The New Yorker, March 24, 2025)
- "The Fear" (Michigan Quarterly Review, Winter 2023, as "Cousins")
- "The Bicycle Accident" (The New Yorker, April 27, 2023)

2.

- "The Call" (Fiction)
- "The Return" (Harper's Magazine, August 2023)
- "The Redwoods" (American Short Fiction, Winter 2020)

3.

- "Small Veins" (Fictionable, Summer 2023)
- "Refuge" (Zyzzyva, Spring 2025)
- "Night Fishing at Antibes" (Telluride Magazine, Summer/Fall 2026)

== Reception ==
The New Yorker included The Frenzy on their list of "The Best Books of 2026 So Far". In The New York Times Book Review, Rand Richards Cooper writes that "...these stories are nothing if not engaging. Like the dire predicaments they unfurl, they are spurred by a dark, relentless force. You want to keep reading. Even with eyes half covered." Publishers Weekly''s review calls the collection "terrific" and concludes, "Full of parenthetical asides that call much of what the reader knows into question, the stories range from sharply compressed to vertiginously recursive. Oates has few competitors as a purveyor of deeply disturbing fiction about the porous border between life and death."
