= András Simor (poet) =

Hungarian poet (1938–2026)

- Born: 5 July 1938; Budapest, Hungary
- Died: 21 June 2026 (aged 87)
- Education: Eötvös Loránd University
- Occupations: Poet, writer

András Simor (5 July 1938 – 21 June 2026) was a Hungarian poet and writer. He notably served as editor-in-chief of the newspaper Ezredvég.

Simor died on 21 June 2026, at the age of 87.

== Publications ==
- Tereld a felhőket! (1962)
- Hangjegy az utcák énekében (1967)
- Partizánerdő (1970)
- Próbálj kirabolni! (1971)
- Világcirkusz (1973)
- Meglátogatom magamat (1975)
- Vurstli (1977)
- Hol van Ariadné? (1981)
- És voltak boldog békeidők (1984)
- Kik örülnek az orgonáknak? (1985)
- Derűs századvég. Válogatott versek (1987)
- Álmok és jelenések (1988)
- Az óra kilenckor állt meg (1990)
- A járókelő és a szakállas (1990)
- Európai idill. Baranyi Ferenc, Csala Károly, Simor András versei (1990)
- Fohász Prométheuszhoz (1990)
- A lélek is hajléktalan. Versek (1993)
- Hagyaték. Versek (1994)
- Magyar Cyrano. Versek (1995)
- Féleleműző. Versek (1997)
- Balga Prométheusz. Válogatott és új versek, 1986–1997 (1998)
- Kérdések Sancho Panzához. Versek (2000)
- Átváltozások könyve (2001)
- Ez vagyok én. Versek (2002)
- Ezredvégi szatírák (2003)
- Kígyóvilág. Versek (2005)
- Narcissus poeticus. 16 poemas y un ensayo / 16 vers és egy tanulmán (2005)
- Colón moderno. Poemas cubanos, 1961–2005 (2006)
- Palackposta a 21. századnak. Versek (2006)
- Dinoszaurusz testvér üzenete. Válogatott versek, 1997–2007 (2007)
- Félszegségem természetrajza. Válogatott kisprózák, 1990–2007 (2007)
- Európa-akol. Versek, 2006–2007 (2008)
- Időutazás. Versek (2008)
- Baljós nyár. Versek (2009)
- Tavaszváró. Versek (2010)
- Vicsorogjunk, hű farkasok. Versek (2011)
- Egy másik haza. Versek, 2011–2012 (2012)
- Tűzimádó ének. Válogatott és új versek, 2006–2012 (2012)
- Tüntessetek, virágok. Versek, 2012–2013 (2013)
- Jézus átka. 100 vers, 2013–2014 (2014)
- Versek a leendőért, 2014–2015 (2015)
- Keresem magam. Versek, 2015–2016 (2016)
- Hiányrímek. Versek és műfordítások (2017)
- Hajléktalan Miatyánk. Versek (2018)
- Komorgó dalok. Versek (2021)
- A forradalom víg dicsérete. Versek (2025)
