= Božo Koprivica =

Serbian essayist, dramatic adviser and literary critic (1950–2026)

- Божо Копривица
- Born: 1950; Nikšić, PR Montenegro, FPR Yugoslavia
- Died: 20 March 2026 (aged 75); Belgrade, Serbia
- Citizenship: Serbian, Montenegrin
- Education: University of Belgrade Faculty of Philology
- Occupations: Essayist, dramatic advisor, literary critic

Božo Koprivica (Serbian Cyrillic: Божо Копривица; 1950 – 20 March 2026) was a Montenegrin essayist, dramatic adviser and literary critic from Montenegro, of Yugoslavian ethnicity.

Koprivica was best known for his books Volej i sluh (from 1992) and Kiš, Borhes i Maradona (from 1996), which reached cult status. He lived and worked in Belgrade, the capital city of Serbia. He was a friend of the Yugoslav novelist and short story writer Danilo Kiš.

Koprivica died on 20 March 2026, at the age of 75.

== Books ==
- Volej i sluh (1992)
- Kiš, Borhes i Maradona (1996)
- Dribling (2006)
- Samo bogovi mogu obećati (2010)
- San ulice (2018)
- Vježbanka Danilo Kiš (2019)
- Ludjak je vječito dijete (2020)
