= Judith Michael =

American writing team

Judith Barnard (born Goldman; February 17, 1932 – May 6, 2026) and Michael Fain (born 1936) were an American married couple who wrote together under the pseudonym Judith Michael. They lived in Chicago and Aspen.

== Biography ==
Barnard was born Judith Goldman in Denver, Colorado, the daughter of shoe store owner Samuel Goldman and Ruth (Eisenstat) Goldman. Her parents divorced when she was a child and her mother married Harry Barnard, a journalist, biographer and historian, and the family relocated to Chicago. She attended Antioch College from 1949 to 1950, received a B.A. from Ohio State University in 1953, and an M.F.A. from Northwestern University in 1962. She worked as a journalist, critic, educational film writer, biographer, and editor. Under her own name, she wrote the novel The Past and Present of Solomon Sorge (1967), which won the Award of Excellence from the Friends of American Literature.

Fain grew up in Chicago and attended the University of Chicago. He worked for over twenty years as an optical and mechanical engineer in high-tech companies in the United States and Canada, including NASA. He also published numerous scientific articles and photographs in newspapers, magazines, and scientific journals under his own name.

The couple married in 1979 and began their literary partnership by producing articles on marriage and family life for periodicals including Redbook, Reader's Digest, and Ladies' Home Journal. They then turned to fiction, and as Judith Michael published eleven bestselling contemporary novels, beginning with Deceptions in 1982. Their novels have been translated into forty languages.

Judith Barnard died of heart failure on May 6, 2026, at the age of 94.

== Bibliography ==
=== as Judith Barnard ===
- The Past and Present of Solomon Sorge (1967)
- Crooked Branches on the Family Tree (2018)

=== as Judith Michael ===
- Deceptions (1982)
- Possessions (1984)
- Private Affairs (1986)
- Inheritance (1988)
- A Ruling Passion (1990)
- Sleeping Beauty (1991)
- Pot of Gold (1993)
- A Tangled Web (1994)
- Acts of Love (1997)
- A Certain Smile (1999)
- The Real Mother (2005)

== Sources ==
- "Judith Barnard", Contemporary Authors Online, Thomson Gale, entry updated 13 February 2001
