= Jean Alambre =

French author and songwriter (1946–2026)

- Born: Jean-Louis Fabry; 16 May 1946; Paris, France
- Died: 3 May 2026 (aged 79)
- Occupations: Author; songwriter

Jean-Louis Fabry (French: [ʒˈɑ̃-lwˈi fabʁˈi]; 16 May 1946 – 3 May 2026), better known by the pen name Jean Alambre (French: [ʒˈɑ̃ alˈɑ̃bʁ]), was a French author and songwriter.

Alambre was best-known for writing for television and radio shows, such as Corrèze Télé Mag.

Alambre died on 3 May 2026, at the age of 79.

== Publications ==
- La Bannière et la croix (1974)
- Le Petit Vin paillé de la Défense (2003)
- Souvenirs d'école, des écrivains racontent (2004)
- Chemins d’octobre (2005)
- Chansons/Je connais un arbre (2007)
- Corrèze par Monts et par Mots/Paroles d’auteurs corréziens (2007)
- Les Souffleurs d’Étoiles (2008)
- Balade en Limousin - Sur les pas des écrivains (2009)
- Les temps... changent ? (2010)
- Jeanne d'Agnoux - De Corrèze à Decazeville (2012)
- Quand la France marchait en sabots (2021)
