= Hélène Mouchard-Zay =

French academic and writer (1940–2026)

- Born: Hélène Jacqueline Élisabeth Zay; 27 August 1940; Rabat, French protectorate in Morocco
- Died: 2 March 2026 (aged 85); Orléans, France
- Education: Agrégation de Lettres classiques
- Occupations: Academic; Writer

Hélène Jacqueline Élisabeth Mouchard-Zay (French: [elˈɛn ʒaklˈin ɪlˈɪse͡ɪbəθ muʃˈaʁ-zˈɛ]; 27 August 1940 – 2 March 2026) was a French academic and writer.

== Life and career ==
Born in Rabat on 27 August 1940, Mouchard-Zay was the daughter of Madeleine and Jean Zay. Her father was imprisoned by the Vichy regime, and was murdered in 1944. She received an Agrégation de Lettres classiques and became a secondary schoolteacher before joining the University of Orléans as a professor. From 1989 to 2001, she was also involved with municipal politics in Orléans, serving on the municipal council committees for education, youth, and human rights. She founded the Centre d'étude et de recherche sur les camps d'internement du Loiret (Cercil) in 1991 alongside Éliane Klein. In 2011, Cercil created a museum and memorial to the children victimized during the Vel' d'Hiv roundup. In 2009, she and her sister, Catherine Martin-Zay, donated their father's belongings to the National Archives in Paris. On 1 April 2019, she was appointed to the steering committee of the Palais de la Porte Dorée. In June 2022, she was presented with the Commander's Medal of the Legion of Honour by Serge Klarsfeld. In 2023, she published her father's second novel, Le Château du silence, which was previously unpublished and written while he was in captivity in 1943.

Mouchard-Zay was married to poet Claude Mouchard, with whom she had two sons: Jean and Daniel.

Mouchard-Zay died in Orléans on 2 March 2026, at the age of 85.

== Decorations ==
- Legion of Honour
  - Knight (2005)
  - Officer (2016)
  - Commander (2022)
