= The Man Who Stole the Gods =

2026 nonfiction book by Matthew Campbell

The Man Who Stole the Gods: A True Story of War, Obsession, and a Global Art Conspiracy
- Author: Matthew Campbell
- Publication date: June 5, 2026
- ISBN: 978-0-593-71600-7

The Man Who Stole the Gods: A True Story of War, Obsession, and a Global Art Conspiracy is a 2026 book by journalist Matthew Campbell on historic artifacts stolen from Cambodia by Bangkok-based British art dealer Douglas Latchford.

== Background ==
Campbell is a Bloomberg reporter based in Singapore.
