= The Score (book) =

2026 book

The Score: How to Stop Playing Somebody Else's Game
- Author: C. Thi Nguyen
- Language: English
- Publisher: Penguin Press
- Publication date: January 13, 2026
- Pages: 368
- ISBN: 978-0593655658

The Score: How to Stop Playing Somebody Else's Game is a book by C. Thi Nguyen.

Nguyen argues that "scoring systems" of various kinds, such as social media likes and school rankings, are increasingly pervasive in modern society and have a tendency to warp our sense of values.

Tim Clare of The Guardian praised the book as "lucid, entertaining and precise... a compelling read, urgent but never alarmist." Simon Ings of The Daily Telegraph gave the book four stars out of five, describing it as "part polemic and part philosophical inquiry... If we truly want to understand our civic plight – and not just tick off some talking points – then we should read The Score. We’ll find that Nguyen has planned this particular long way round with skill."

Kirkus Reviews stated that "Nguyen’s narrative can sometimes be heady to the point of headachy, but he’s also delightfully irreverent... An engaging look at the games we play and whatever freedom we might have as we do so."
