= Judge Stone (novel) =

2026 legal thriller by James Patterson and Viola Davis

- Author: Viola Davis James Patterson
- Language: English
- Genre: Legal thriller, courtroom drama
- Publisher: Little, Brown and Company (US) Century (UK)
- Publication date: March 9, 2026
- Publication place: United States
- Media type: Print (hardcover), e-book, audiobook
- Pages: 432 (hardcover)
- ISBN: 978-0-316-57983-4

Judge Stone is a 2026 legal thriller novel co-written by actress Viola Davis and American author James Patterson. Published by Little, Brown and Company on March 9, 2026, the novel centers on a Black female judge in rural Alabama who presides over a controversial abortion case that divides her small town and attracts national attention.

== Plot ==
The novel is set in Union Springs, Alabama, where Judge Mary Stone presides over the local circuit court. Stone, a Black woman who graduated at the top of her class from the University of Alabama Law School, runs her family farm and hosts Saturday morning community breakfasts at her home. She is respected throughout the town and is preparing for reelection. Thirteen-year-old Nova Jones seeks to terminate her pregnancy. Dr. Bria Gaines performs the procedure and is subsequently arrested for committing a Class A felony under Alabama law, which carries a potential sentence of 99 years in prison and includes no exceptions for rape or incest.

Judge Stone is assigned to preside over Dr. Gaines's trial. She faces pressure from multiple directions to recuse herself: from the district attorney seeking maximum punishment, from a local pastor, from anonymous callers, and from Alabama Governor Bert Lamar, who threatens to call in the National Guard. Stone's sister warns her that the case will "destroy" her. As tensions escalate, someone involved with the case is murdered.

== Publication ==
Judge Stone was released on March 9, 2026, in hardcover, large print, e-book, and audiobook formats. The audiobook is narrated by Viola Davis. The UK edition was published by Century, an imprint of Penguin Random House.

== Reception ==
=== Critical reception ===
Judge Stone received mixed to positive reviews from critics. Kirkus Reviews gave the book a starred review, calling it a "first-class courtroom drama, small-town excitement, and strong characters all wrapped in a moral dilemma," and described the work as "tense, readable, and relevant."

In a more mixed assessment, Publishers Weekly wrote that the novel is "stronger on characterization than plot," noting that while Judge Stone is a "memorable, fiercely independent lead," and the authors deserve credit for tackling a contentious issue, "contrivances abound and the narrative ends with a whimper."

=== Audiobook reception ===
The audiobook, narrated by Viola Davis, received strong praise. Kirkus Reviews stated: "Davis is a force of nature, and her performance is riveting," adding that she is "both subtle and blatant, giving texture to each of her characterizations. With deftness and artistry, she creates a world of ordinary, flesh-and-blood people and handles preconceptions based on antiquated prejudices with controlled rage. This one really is unputdownable."

=== Commercial reception ===
The novel performed well commercially, appearing on bestseller lists following its release.
