= Lara Mimosa Montes =

American poet and writer

Lara Mimosa Montes is an American poet, fiction writer and essayist. She is a recipient of the Whiting Award.

== Career ==
Her books include the novella The Time of the Novel (2025), as well as two previous books of poetry, THRESHOLES (2020) and The Somnambulist (2016).

== Writing ==
In her writing, Montes is known for her inventive styles and forms. The New York Times highlighted how in her poetry, for example, Montes use glyphs as a form of stylized textual punctuation.

In The Time of the Novel, the protagonist quits her job at a bookstore to become a narrator.

== Personal life ==
Montes was born in New York City. She attended a PhD program at CUNY. As of 2026, she lived in Minneapolis.

== Awards ==
In 2026, Montes was awarded the Whiting Award in fiction.
