= The Great Resistance (book) =

2026 book

- Author: Carrie Gibson
- Language: English
- Publisher: Atlantic Monthly Press
- Publication date: January 6, 2026
- Publication place: United States
- Pages: 624
- ISBN: 978-0802165497

The Great Resistance: The 400-Year Fight to End Slavery in the Americas is a 2026 book by Carrie Gibson.

== Overview ==
The Great Resistance covers the history of the fights for freedom of enslaved people in the Western Hemisphere, from the 1521 Santo Domingo Slave Revolt to the abolition of slavery in Brazil in 1888.

In an interview with Martin Pengelly of The Guardian, Gibson described her motivation for writing the book: "So much that is known about the rise of slavery, the system of slavery, and the end of slavery, tends to be in the English-speaking world... I’ve spent a lot of time in Cuba, so I write about the Spanish-speaking world and the Spanish empire, and then there’s slavery in Brazil, which is a whole other thing. And when you’re in the scholarship, it’s linguistically divided. I wanted to bring it all together. I wanted to see what it looked like," adding that "There’s been a big historical turn. In the last 20 or 30 years there’s become a lot more interest in the movement by enslaved people to get their own freedom, versus white abolitionism, which for a long time, certainly in Britain, received a lot of attention."

== Publication history ==
Carrie Gibson earned a PhD in Spanish Caribbean history from the University of Cambridge, subsequently working as a journalist for The Guardian. The book is Gibson's third book, following the 2014 Empire’s Crossroads: A History of the Caribbean from Columbus to the Present Day and the 2019 El Norte: The Epic and Forgotten Story of Hispanic North America.

== Critical reception ==
Publishers Weekly gave the book a starred review, saying that "Digesting vast amounts of information, Gibson constructs a sweeping vision of resistance to slavery as a defining element of Western history that made 'abstract concepts of freedom concrete.' Expansive and elegant, this is a marvel."

Kirkus Reviews gave the book a more mixed review, describing it as a "solid contribution to the literature of the New World slave trade," although saying that Sudhir Hazareesingh's 2025 Daring to be Free: Rebellion and Resistance of the Enslaved in the Atlantic World was "more fluently told."
