= C. Thi Nguyen =

American philosopher

C. Thi Nguyen (born 1977 or 1978) is an American philosopher and academic. Known for his work on the philosophy of games, he is a professor of philosophy at the University of Utah.

== Career ==
After graduating from Harvard University, where he majored in philosophy, Nguyen lived in the Boston area working as a tech writer. He "made a lot of money" but hated it, and enrolled in a philosophy PhD program at the University of California, Los Angeles. Nguyen completed his dissertation on the epistemology of moral testimony while working as a food writer for the Los Angeles Times.

After completing his doctorate, Nguyen taught as an adjunct professor while doing work on the philosophy of aesthetics.

His first book, Games: Agency as Art won the American Philosophical Association's 2021 Book Prize. A review in the LA Review of Books describes the book as arguing that "game design is the art of engineering paths to success that make for a pleasurable, beautiful experiences."

A 2021 special issue of the Journal of the Philosophy of Sport responded to Nguyen's work, the Games book in particular.

Nguyen plays board, video, and role-playing games, rock climbs, yo-yos, cooks, and fly fishes, and he discusses his interest in these games and hobbies in his work.

Nguyen's second book, The Score: How to Stop Playing Somebody Else’s Game was published in January 2026. It has received generally positive reviews and deals with the pitfalls in gamifying everyday life mindlessly. The Washington Post called it "profound, rigorous and frequently beautiful.". The Guardian called it a "compelling read".

He has described one consequence of rankings, score keeping, and gamification as "value capture" which he describes in The Score as occurring "when you get your values from some external source and let them rule you without adapting them.”

Since 2020, Nguyen has been a professor at the University of Utah. He previously taught at Utah Valley University.

== Selected works ==
- Games: Agency as Art. Oxford University Press. 2020. ISBN 9780190052089
- "Value Capture." Journal of Ethics and Social Philosophy. 27 (3). 2024 doi:10.26556/jesp.v27i3.3048
- The Score: How to Stop Playing Somebody Else’s Game. Penguin Press. 2026 ISBN 978-0-593-65565-8
