= Crux (novel) =

2026 literary fiction novel by American author Gabriel Tallent

- Author: Gabriel Tallent
- Language: English
- Subject: Rock climbing, adolescence, coming-of-age
- Genre: Literary fiction
- Publisher: Riverhead Books
- Publication date: January 6, 2026
- Publication place: United States
- Media type: Print, e-book, audiobook
- Pages: 416

Crux is a 2026 literary fiction novel by American author Gabriel Tallent. Published by Riverhead Books, the novel centers on Dan and Tamma, two teenage climbers in the Mojave Desert of California and explores themes of adolescence, risk, and community.

== Themes and style ==
Reviewers note that the novel uses the physical and technical discipline of rock climbing as a framework to examine the psychological terrain of adolescence, including themes of trust, grief, and the search for identity. Tallent's prose has been described as "visceral" and "meticulous" in its detailed depiction of climbing techniques and the natural environment.

== Development ==
Gabriel Tallent, author of My Absolute Darling, is reportedly an avid climber. Research and writing for the novel involved extensive time in the Sierra Nevada and consultation with professional climbers.

== Reception ==
Crux received positive reviews upon publication. The New York Times called it "a master class in suspense" that successfully marries an adventure narrative with deep character study. The Guardian praised its "unflinching" portrayal of teenage passion and the climbing community, while The Boston Globe highlighted Tallent's ability to render "both the granite of the mountains and the grit of his characters" with equal precision.
