= Carlos Mella =

Spanish politician (1930–2026)

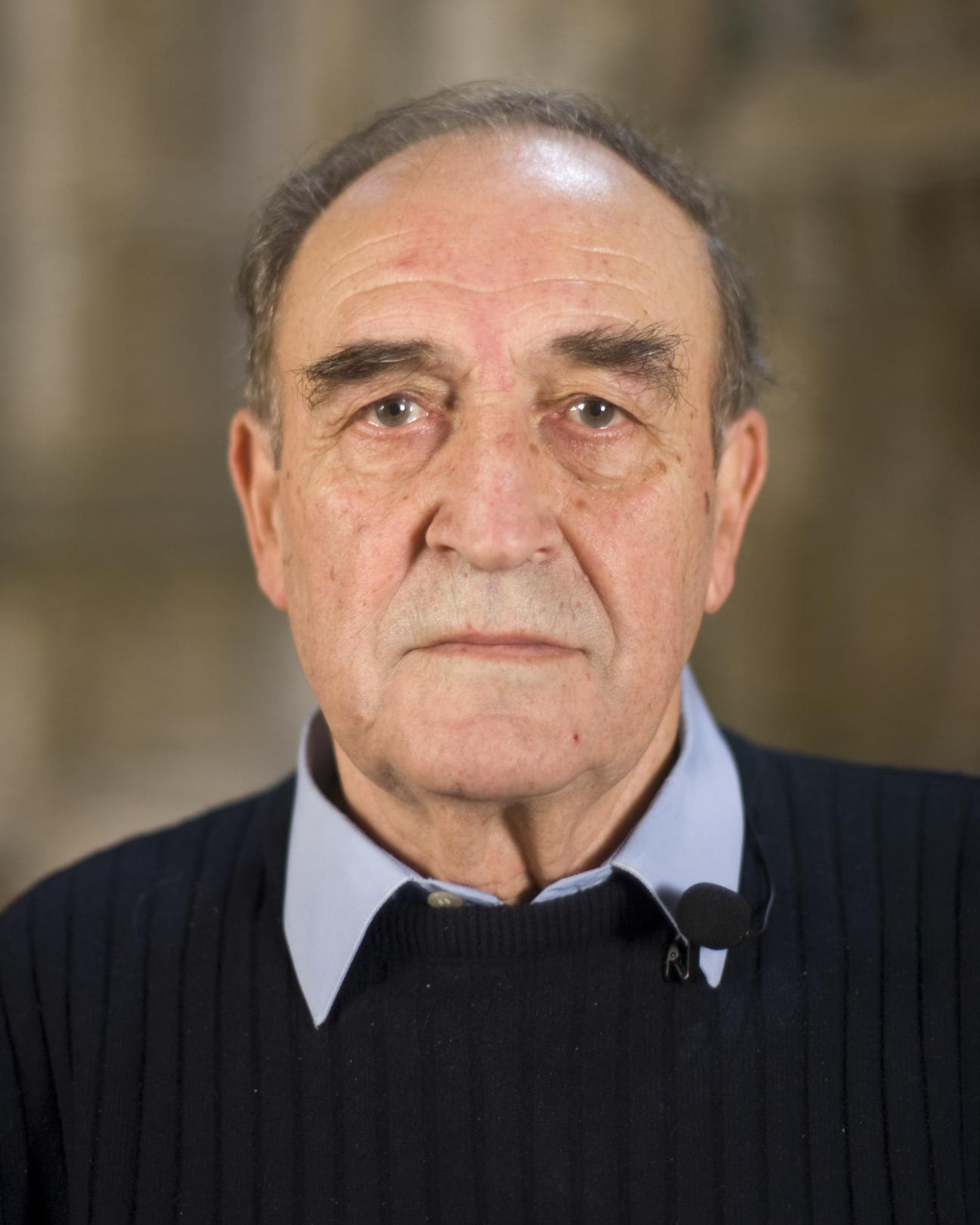
- Mella in 2007

Minister of Economy, Finance and Trade of Galicia
- In office 1983–1984
- Preceded by: Carlos Otero Díaz
- Succeeded by: Xaime Trebolle

Personal details
- Born: Xosé Carlos Mella Villar; 13 August 1930 A Estrada, Spain
- Died: 21 April 2026 (aged 95) Santiago de Compostela, Spain
- Party: UCD; PNG–PG
- Education: Complutense University of Madrid; University of Paris
- Occupation: Writer

Xosé Carlos Mella Villar (13 August 1930 – 21 April 2026) was a Spanish politician. A member of the Union of the Democratic Centre and the Galician Nationalist Party–Galicianist Party, he served as Minister of Economy, Finance and Trade of Galicia from 1983 to 1984.

Mella died in Santiago de Compostela on 21 April 2026, at the age of 95.
