= Bernard Eliade =

French writer and teacher (1938–2026)

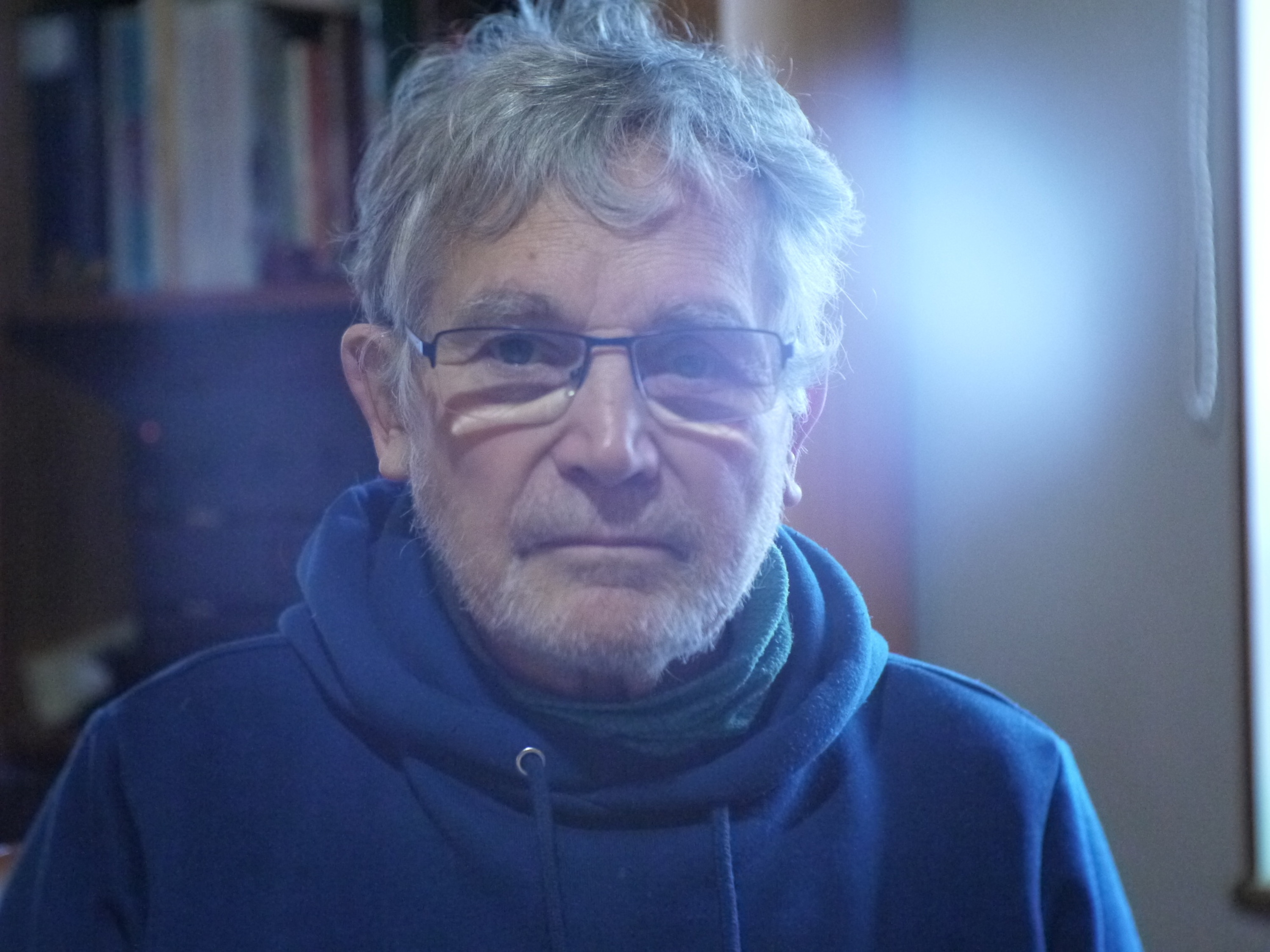
- Eliade in 2021
- Born: 1938; Paris, France
- Died: 13 April 2026 (aged 87); Dijon, France
- Occupations: Writer, teacher

Bernard Eliade (French: [bɛʁnˈaʁ eljˈad]; 1938 – 13 April 2026) was a French writer and teacher.

Eliade was best known for teaching foreign students in Drancy and adopting teaching techniques used by Célestin Freinet, on which he wrote numerous books.

Eliade died in Dijon on 13 April 2026, at the age of 87.

== Works ==
=== Teaching books ===
- L'École ouverte (1970)
- Pour une école ouverte
- La publicité
- Combien d'Hiroshima ?
- Microbes et virus
- L'espace, pour quoi faire ?
- Lecture-animation de « Montserrat » d'Emmanuel Roblès
- Lecture-animation de « La Guerre des boutons » de Louis Pergaud
- Exercices de soutien pour réussir
- Un racisme ordinaire

=== Other works ===
- L'Esprit du loup
- Chronique de la nuit qui vient
- De mes nouvelles
- La Chair du monde
- PayMages
- Une société incestuaire (Hypothèse de travail sur les rapports inceste/société totalitaire = Ouverte à tous)
- Le petit Livre des Haï-songs au Quotidien
- Haï-songs des Amours
- Un bouquet d'haï-songs
- Haï-songs pour le Monde comme il va
- PARCELLES, Explorer/Enrichir/Partager notre Territoire au Quotidien
- Le Buissonnaire, Petit dictionnaire pirate de la langue française (2016)
