= Jean Fourié =

French writer and community activist (1944–2026)

- Born: Jean Aimé Adolphe Fourié; 20 November 1944; Espéraza, France
- Died: 8 June 2026 (aged 81); Carcassonne, France
- Occupations: Writer; Community activist

Jean Aimé Adolphe Fourié (French: [ʒˈɑ̃ ɛmˈe adˈɔlf fuʁjˈe]; 20 November 1944 – 8 June 2026) was a French writer and community activist.

== Life and career ==
Born in Espéraza on 20 November 1944, Fourié was the son of Émile and Blanche Fourié. He moved to Paris and began working for the Caisse des dépôts et consignations. In 1973, he joined the Société d'études scientifiques de l'Aude, where he met Occitan activist Jean Lesaffre. The following year, he became general secretary of the Société des félibres de Paris. In 1987, he became Major of the Félibrige. He returned to the south of France after 2000, serving as Deputy Mayor of Espéraza until 2015. In 2022, he was named president of the Académie de Carcassonne.

Fourié died in Carcassonne on 8 June 2026, at the age of 81.

== Publications ==
- Émile Barthe et les écrivains biterrois d'expression occitane (1975)
- Diccionari de la literatura occitana audenca (1982)
- Contribution à l'histoire du Félibrige parisien (1987)
- Al camin del temps (1988)
- Coma s'èra ièr (1997)
- Espéraza : essai historique (2002)
- Dictionnaire des auteurs de langue d'oc (2009)

== Awards ==
- Prix Auguste-Fourès (1975)
- Médaille de Florian
  - Silver (1984)
  - Grand Gold (2002)
