= Glaudi Barsotti =

French Occitan writer and journalist (1934–2026

Glaudi Barsotti (also spelled Glaudi Barsòtti in Occitan or Claude Barsotti in French; 27 January 1934 – 23 February 2026) was a French Occitan writer and journalist born in Marseille.

Barsòtti died on 23 February 2026, at the age of 92.

== Selected works ==
- A flor e mesura, cronicas d'un jornalista, 1963
- Lo lop en Occitània, 1964
- Antologia deis escrivans sociaus provençaus (1875 a 1914), 1975
- La tèrra deis autres, roman, Vent Terral, 1979
- Le music-hall marseillais de 1815 a 1914, 1984
- Parlam provençau (obratge collectiu), 1971
- Un sègle de premsa occitana a Marselha de 1840 a 1940, 1981-1982
- Cronicas, 1990
- Bestiari d'Occitània, Lexic latin-occitan provençau-francés dei vertebrats d'Occitània, IEO Sector Recèrca, 1992 (255 p., ISBN 2-85910-116-0).
- Un papier sensa importància, novel, IEO, 1994
- Le bouil et le tian: la cuisine du terroir provençal, 1996, Ais de Provença, Edisud
- Testimòni d'un niston de la guèrra, autobiografia, IEO, 2002, ISBN 2-859103-22-8
- L'estraç, novel, IEO, 2002, ISBN 2-859102-97-3
- Lo comunard de la Mitidjà, novel, IEO, ISBN 2-859103-87-2
