= 2026 in Mexico =

- Decades: 2000s; 2010s; 2020s
- See also: History of Mexico; List of years in Mexico; Timeline of Mexican history

This article lists events occurring in Mexico during 2026. The list also contains names of the incumbents at federal and state levels and cultural and entertainment activities of the year.

== Events ==
=== January ===
- 2 January – A magnitude 6.5 earthquake hits Guerrero, killing two people.
- 8 January – Carlos Castro, the director of the online media outlet Código Norte Veracruz, is shot dead in Poza Rica.
- 13 January – The head of operations of the Jalisco New Generation Cartel in Guadalajara is arrested in Zapopan.
- 16 January – American fugitive Alejandro Castillo is captured in Pachuca after nearly 10 years on the run.
- 19 January – Businessman Carlos Slim announces he will buy two offshore oil fields previously owned by Russian oil company Lukoil, which was sanctioned.
- 20 January – Mexico extradites 37 suspected drug cartel members to the United States.
- 21 January –
  - Footballers Brian Gutiérrez and Richard Ledezma are granted approval by FIFA to play senior level international matches for the Mexico national team.
  - Canadian snowboarder and alleged drug lord Ryan Wedding is arrested in Mexico City.
- 22 January – César Alejandro Sepúlveda Arellano, the suspected leader of the Blancos de Troya criminal group, is arrested in Buenavista, Michoacán.
- 25 January – At least 11 people are killed in an armed attack at a football match in Salamanca, Guanajuato.
- 27 January – President Sheinbaum announces the suspension of oil shipments to Cuba.
- 28 January – 10 people are abducted from mining facilities owned by Vizsla Silver in Sinaloa. Nine of the 10 victims are subsequently found dead in Concordia, Sinaloa, among 10 sets of human remains recovered from a site known as La Fosa de El Verde.
- 29 January – Sergio Torres Félix and Elizabeth Montoya Ojeda, members of the Congress of Sinaloa for the Citizens' Movement, are injured in an armed attack in Culiacán.

=== February ===
- 2 February – Footballer Obed Vargas signs with La Liga club Atlético Madrid on a four-and-a-half-year contract with Atlético paying $3 million dollars for Vargas.
- 5 February –
  - A health alert is declared in Jalisco due to a measles outbreak in Guadalajara.
  - Tequila mayor Diego Rivera Navarro (Morena) is arrested by Jalisco state police over accusations of extortion, drug trafficking, money laundering and accepting bribes from the CJNG cartel.
  - Santiago Gallon Henao, a suspect in the 1994 killing of Colombian football player Andrés Escobar, is shot dead in Huixquilucan, State of Mexico.
- 6–22 February – Mexico at the 2026 Winter Olympics
- 10 February – An Iztapalapa-based nurse is arrested in Oaxaca by state police after being on the run since early January for running over and killing a delivery motorcyclist. She was returned to Mexico City the following day.
- 11 February – Mexico confirms it suspended all fuel shipments to Cuba to avoid punitive tariffs by the United States, but vows to continue shipments of humanitarian aid.
- 19 February – Authorities announce the seizure of nearly four tonnes of cocaine and the arrest of three people from a semisubmersible craft off the coast of Manzanillo, Colima.
- 22 February –
  - The military and state police ambush and kill CJNG boss Nemesio Oseguera Cervantes, also known as "El Mencho", in Tapalpa, Jalisco.
  - A wave of violent cartel roadblocks ravages through multiple states following the killing of El Mencho with confirmed clashes and roadblocks in Jalisco, Michoacán, Tamaulipas, Colima, Guanajuato, Aguascalientes, Puebla and Quintana Roo.
- 26 February –
  - The Supreme Court of Mexico convenes in Tenejapa, Chiapas, in its first session in its history outside Mexico City.
  - TV Azteca files for bankruptcy protection intended to restructure the network with approximately $2 billion to $2.2 billion (USD) under judicial supervision.
- 28 February – A bus falls into a ravine in Tlalneplanta, Morelos, killing eight people and injuring 24 others.

=== March ===
- 6 March – A fire destroys 60 structures in Punta Zicatela, Oaxaca.
- 15 March – Mexico wins the Guinness World Record for the largest football class after 9,500 people attend an event held at the Zócalo in Mexico City.
- 17 March – Five people are killed following a fire at the Dos Bocas Refinery in Paraíso, Tabasco.
- 18 March – Ángel Esteban Aguilar Morales aka Lobo Menor, an Ecuadorean national suspected of leading the Los Lobos gang and wanted in Ecuador over the assassination of Fernando Villavicencio in 2023, is arrested in Mexico City and extradited to Colombia, where he is also wanted on charges of involvement with FARC dissidents.
- 19 March – A raid kills 11 members of the Sinaloa Cartel in El Álamo, Sinaloa, with a senior cartel leader being captured along with many weapons.
- 24 March – 2026 Lázaro Cárdenas school shooting: Two female staff members are killed by a 15-year-old male at a high school in Lázaro Cárdenas, Michoacán.
- 25 March –
  - Berta Olga Gómez Fong, wife of former Chihuahua governor César Duarte, is detained in El Paso, Texas, by U.S. Immigration and Customs Enforcement.
  - Two people are killed in a collapse at the El Rosario mine in Sinaloa.
- 26 March – The Mexican Navy launches a search and rescue operation in the Caribbean Sea for two sailboats which departed from Isla Mujeres with nine crew members, carrying humanitarian aid to Cuba after they failed to arrive in Havana as scheduled and lost communication. The missing vessels and crew are found safe on 29 March.
- 28 March – The Estadio Azteca (now Banorte) reopens to the public with Mexico taking on Portugal ending in a 0–0 draw, with 84,130 spectators in attendance.
- 31 March – The government begins construction of a 25 billion peso desalination plant in Playas de Rosarito, Baja California, to be completed in 2029. The plant will be the largest and most modern in Latin America and will produce 2,200 liters of water per second.

=== April ===
- 1 April – Juan Ramón de la Fuente resigns as Secretary of Foreign Affairs for health reasons. He is replaced by Roberto Velasco Álvarez.
- 14 April –
  - Netflix acquires the broadcasting rights of the Mexico national team for the 2027 and 2029 CONCACAF Nations League finals and Gold Cup editions.
  - The United States imposes sanctions on two casinos in Tamaulipas and three individuals over the links to the Cártel del Noreste.
- 15 April – Killing of Carolina Flores Gómez. A video is leaked showing former beauty queen Carolina Flores Gómez being killed in Mexico City by her mother-in-law, Erika María Herrera, in a femicide.
- 19 April –
  - A truck carrying Mexican and American law enforcement agents returning from an anti-drug operation falls into a ravine in Morelos, Chihuahua, killing two Mexican officers and two U.S. undercover CIA agents.
  - The 34-km Gran Tenochtitlán Bikeway, running from Plaza Tlaxcoaque to the Aztec Stadium in Mexico City, is officially opened.
  - János Balla aka Dániel Takács, a suspected drug trafficker wanted in Hungary and subject to an Interpol Red Notice, is arrested in Quintana Roo.
- 20 April – 2026 Teotihuacan shooting: A gunman opens fire from atop the Pyramid of the Moon in Teotihuacan, killing a Canadian woman and injuring 13 other tourists. The perpetrator later commits suicide.
- 23 April – Former Mexican Navy rear admiral Fernando Farías Laguna is arrested in Buenos Aires on allegations of fuel contraband and criminal association with drug cartels.
- 28 April – Senior CJNG leader Audias Flores Silva aka "El Jardinero" is arrested near El Mirador, Nayarit.
- 29 April – Sinaloa governor Rubén Rocha Moya and nine other Mexican government officials are indicted by the U.S. Department of Justice on charges of conspiring with the Sinaloa Cartel, other charges include money laundering and fuel trafficking. Rocha and Culiacán mayor Juan de Dios Gámez Mendívil subsequently go on leave beginning 1 May.

=== May ===
- 1 May – A bus overturns in Amatlán de Cañas, Nayarit, killing 11 people and injuring 31.
- 5 May – Diana Toro Díaz, accused of collaborating with the Sinaloa Cartel, is arrested in Canada. Charges include drug trafficking, money laundering and extortion.
- 7 May – The U.S. Department of State and other federal agencies order an investigation of all 53 Mexican consulates in that country. The Trump administration accuses former president Andrés Manuel López Obrador of utilizing Mexican consulates in the U.S. to monitor political activities.
- 11–15 May – Former Sinaloa secretary of public security Gerardo Mérida Sánchez and former state treasurer Enrique Díaz Vega are arrested in the United States, the first two of the 10 Mexican officials indicted by the U.S. Department of Justice over allegations of corruption and drug trafficking to be taken into custody.
- 17 May – Ten people are killed in an attack by gunmen on the town of Tehuitzingo, Puebla.
- 25 May – President Claudia Sheinbaum announces that Mexico will host the Iran national football team for the 2026 FIFA World Cup after the Trump administration refuses to host the team in the US during its war against Iran.
- 26 May – President Sheinbaum publicly calls on the public to boycott TV Azteca amid a feud between the network and the federal government over censorship and freedom of speech.

=== June ===
- 3 June – A Los Angeles Times article reveals that the U.S. Department of Justice is investigating both Sonora and Tamaulipas governors Alfonso Durazo and Américo Villarreal, allegedly for drug trafficking and fuel contraband.
- 7 June – 2026 Coahuila state election (all 25 seats in the Congress of Coahuila)
- 11 June – 19 July – 2026 FIFA World Cup
- 13 June – Joel Bravo Martínez, the mayor of San Miguel Amatitlán in Oaxaca, is shot dead.
- 24 June – Seventeen people are injured when a car drives into a crowd of football fans in Cabo San Lucas, Baja California Sur; the driver is beaten by fans and dies of his injuries six days later.
- 25 June – The General Council of the National Electoral Institute (INE) approves the creation of two new political parties: Construyendo Sociedades de Paz and Somos México.

=== July ===
- 1 July – Four people die, three ‌of asphyxiation, during World Cup celebrations in Mexico City.
- 2 July – Gilda Susana Lozoya, sister of former Pemex director Emilio Lozoya Austin, is arrested at Mexico City International Airport by authorities over allegations of corruption and money laundering.
- 16 July – The former governor of Baja California, Ernesto Ruffo Appel, is arrested at his residence in Ensenada accused of running a fuel contraband operation; other charges include money laundering and extortion.
- 17 July – A magnitude 7.3 earthquake hits Chiapas, injuring 18 people.
- 20 July – Former Sinaloa Cartel boss Ismael "El Mayo" Zambada is sentenced to life in prison by a U.S. court.
- 24 July – The United States imposes a 10% tariff on Mexico, citing the presence of alleged forced labor in the supply chain.
- 27 July – A fleet of 57 PepsiCo delivery vehicles is burned in an arson attack in Matamoros, Tamaulipas. It is widely suspected that organized crime is behind the incident.
- 30 July – Federal authorities arrest Ramón Ángel Álvarez Ayala known as "R1", he is presumably the main suspect in the 2025 murders of Valeria Márquez and Uruapan mayor Carlos Manzo.

=== August ===
- 12 August –
  - A list of media outlets published by Secretary Luisa María Alcalde Luján is released during the morning conference. The listing includes media outlets that allegedly promote disinformation and defamation against the federal government.
  - The U.S. Department of State confirms the revocation of visa entry to Andrés Manuel López Beltrán, the son of former president Andrés Manuel López Obrador. López Beltrán accused both the Trump administration and the Department of State claiming the revocation of his U.S. visa is a purely political move.
- 21 August – Sinaloa governor Rubén Rocha Moya, on a leave of absence since May following accusations of ties to organized crime, returns to office.
- 22 August – Rubén Rocha Moya asks the Congress of Sinaloa to grant him an indefinite leave of absence from his position as governor of Sinaloa.
- 31 August – Mass layoffs begin at TV Azteca as the network undergoes corporate restructuring after it declared bankruptcy in early 2026.

=== September ===
- 5 September – Ten people are killed in an explosion at a depot storing fireworks during a festival in Santa María Canchesda, Temascalcingo, State of Mexico.
- 8 September – Mexico is ranked 37th out of 38 OECD countries in the PISA 2025 results released in September 2026, showing a major decline in student performance.
- 12 September – Claudia Tacoronte Aguilera, a Spanish exchange student at the UAEM, is murdered in Cuautla, Morelos.
- 25 September – The Congress of Oaxaca votes unanimously to dissolve the municipal government of Juchitán de Zaragoza following the arrest of mayor Miguel Sánchez Altamirano on suspicion of ties to organised crime.
- 29 September – Hurricane Polo makes landfall over Baja California Sur after generating extensive flooding and landslides that leave two people dead and three missing.

=== October ===
- 1 October – One person is killed and three others are injured in a school attack in Torreón, Coahuila.
- 5 October – Federal authorities in Zapopan arrest CJNG coordinator Iván Cazarín Molina aka "El Tanque", charges range from murder, drug trafficking, money laundering and fuel contraband. "El Tanque" is believed to have commanded an ambush attack against military forces in a 2015 raid that resulted in the deaths of several military personnel.
- 12 October – A failed apprehension raid in Totolapan, Morelos, forces the State Attorney General’s office to release high-ranking Pueblos Unidos (a Sinaloa Cartel affiliate) coordinator José David Vergara, aka "El Güero Jim", in exchange for three kidnapped law enforcement officers.
- 17 October – Sixteen people are rescued by the US Coast Guard after a boat capsized some 225 km (140 mi) west of Ensenada, inside the country's exclusive economic zone near the Baja California coast.
- 25 October – National Electoral Institute contracting scandal: Guadalupe Taddei announces her resignation as president of the National Electoral Institute amid allegations of malfeasance.
- 30 October –
  - Former TV host Inés Gómez Mont is arrested in Miami by the FBI on charges of corruption, embezzlement, fraud and money laundering. Gómez Mont had been on the run since 2021.
  - The FBI opens an investigation against former footballer, governor of Morelos, current federal deputy, Cuauhtémoc Blanco over activities of drug trafficking, fraud and money laundering. Blanco's U.S. visa entry was then cancelled by the Department of State, Blanco's wife Natalia Rezende Moreira was detained days earlier in New York City after not declaring over US$10,000 in cash.

=== November ===
- 8 November – State police and federal agents raid the Sabea nightclub in Zapopan, Jalisco resulting in the arrest of Rafael Álvarez Ayala, known as "R2" a reputed leader of the CJNG's "Los Rs" faction along with 19 other individuals, the operation was a joint intelligence collaboration between Mexican authorities and American DEA agents.
- 20–21 November – Security forces arrest Los Mazatlecos cartel leader Fausto Isidro Meza Flores ("El Chapo Isidro"), one of the FBI's Ten Most Wanted fugitives, during an overnight raid in Guasave, Sinaloa. Four soldiers and seven suspected cartel gunmen are killed in the operation.
- 2026 Amputee Football World Cup

== Sports ==
- Mexico at the 2026 Winter Olympics

== Holidays ==
- 1 January – New Year's Day
- 2 February – Constitution Day
- 16 March – Benito Juárez Day
- 2 April – Maundy Thursday
- 3 April – Good Friday
- 1 May – Labour Day
- 5 May – Cinco de Mayo
- 16 September – Independence Day
- 12 October – Día de la Raza
- 2 November – Day of the Dead
- 17 November – Revolution Day
- 12 December – Feast of Our Lady of Guadalupe
- 25 December – Christmas Day

== Art and entertainment ==
- List of Mexican submissions for the Academy Award for Best International Feature Film

== Deaths ==
=== January ===
- 16 January – Guillermo Fonseca Álvarez, 92, PRI politician, mayor of San Luis Potosí (1968–1970), governor of San Luis Potosí (1973–1979) and two-term federal deputy.
- 22 January – Pedro Pablo Elizondo, 76, prelate of the Roman Catholic Church.
- 22 January – Ernesto Gil Elorduy, 82, PRI politician, mayor of Pachuca (1985–1988), senator and two-term federal deputy.
- 30 January – Henner Hofmann, 75, cinematographer and film producer.
- 31 January – Gustavo Sánchez Vásquez, 62, PAN politician, municipal president of Mexicali (2016–2019) and incumbent senator for Baja California.
- 31 January – Gerardo Taracena, 55, actor (Apocalypto, Man on Fire, Narcos: Mexico).

=== February ===
- 2 February – Miguel Ángel Alba Díaz, 75, Roman Catholic prelate, bishop of La Paz, Baja California Sur.
- 5 February – Eladio González Garza, 89, voice actor.
- 5 February – Marcela Romero, 66, writer, cultural promoter and actress.
- 11 February – Guillermo Monroy Becerril, 102, muralist.
- 12 February – María Elena Álvarez Bernal, 95, PAN politician, senator (1997–2000) and four-term federal deputy.
- 12 February – Milkman, 36, rapper, producer, and composer.
- 13 February – Dolores Muñoz Ledo, 107, voice actress.
- 14 February – Jorge Meléndez Preciado, 81, journalist (Radio Educación, La Jornada).
- 18 February – Roger von Gunten, 92, Swiss-born artist and sculptor.
- 22 February – Nemesio Oseguera Cervantes, 59, drug lord, leader of the Jalisco New Generation Cartel (since 2010).

=== March ===
- 3 March – Rafael del Castillo, 92, football executive (1980–1988).
- 3 March – Ana Luisa Peluffo, 96, actress from the Golden Age of Mexican cinema.
- 5 March – Pedro Friedeberg, 90, Italian-born visual artist.
- 8 March – Melchor Peredo, 99, muralist.
- 10 March – Ricardo Pérez Montfort, 71, historian and writer (UNAM, Academia Mexicana de Ciencias).
- 11 March – Ignacio Madrazo Navarro, 83, neurosurgeon, Premio Nacional de Ciencias in 1987.
- 11 March – Luis Téllez Tejeda, 43, poet and cultural promoter.
- 15 March – Pablo Jurado, 22, footballer (goalkeeper).
- 17 March – Alicia Caro, 95, Colombian-born actress from the Golden Age of Mexican cinema.
- 30 March – Deborah Dultzin, 80, astrophysicist at the UNAM's Institute of Astronomy.

=== April ===
- 1 April – Salvador Castañeda Álvarez, 79, guerrilla (Movimiento de Acción Revolucionaria) and writer.
- 10 April – Magaly Achach Solís, 71, PRI politician from Quintana Roo.
- 11 April – Manuel Gurría Ordóñez, 94, PRI politician, governor of Tabasco (1991–1992).
- 13 April – Benjamín Castillo Plascencia, 80, Roman Catholic prelate.
- 13 April – Juan Cruz Martínez, 73, politician from Durango.
- 14 April – Ana Belén López Pulido, writer and poet.
- 15 April – Carolina Flores Gómez, 27, beauty queen.
- 15 April – Lucha Moreno, 86, singer and actress from the Golden Age of Mexican cinema.
- 16 April – Alejandro Burillo, 74, former media executive, football and tennis promoter.
- 16 April – Miguel Canto, 78, boxing champion.
- 21 April – Ricardo de Pascual, 85, actor and comedian.
- 22 April – Karina Duprez, 79, actress and director.
- 22 April – José Ulises Macías Salcedo, 85, Roman Catholic prelate.
- 24 April – Gran Markus Jr., 72, wrestler.
- 24 April – Rossana Reguillo, 70, sociologist and academic (ITESO).

=== May ===
- 3 May – Jorge Alatorre, 55, civil servant and academic (University of Guadalajara).
- 4 May – Miguel Ángel J. Márquez Ruiz, 83, veterinarian and academic (UNAM).
- 9 May – Antonio Becerra Gaytán, 93, veteran left-wing politician from Chihuahua, federal deputy for the Mexican Communist Party (1979–1982).
- 16 May – Dai-won Moon, 83, South Korean-born martial artist, "Father of Mexican Taekwondo".
- 17 May – Luis de la Peña, 94, physicist and academic (UNAM).
- 18 May – Ulises Schmill Ordóñez, 89, judge, minister (1985–1994) and president of the supreme court (1991–1994).
- 29 May – Jorge Treviño Martínez, 90, PRI politician, federal deputy (1982–1985) and governor of Nuevo León (1985–1991).
- 30 May – Billy Álvarez, 80, former football executive and president of Cruz Azul (1986–2020).

=== June ===
- 5 June – Abraham Pérez, 77, actor who played Licenciado Cortillo on the telenovela La familia P. Luche (2002–2012)

=== July ===
- 1 July – Óscar Levín Coppel, 77, PRI politician from Sinaloa, three-term federal deputy.
- 3 July – Juan Frausto Pallares, 84, Roman Catholic prelate, auxiliary bishop of León, Guanajuato.
- 3 July – Benjamín Medrano Quezada, 59, PRI politician, municipal president of Fresnillo, Zacatecas, in 2013–2015.
- 3 July – Lorenzo Salgado Araujo, 52, builder, shot by United States Immigration and Customs Enforcement in Houston, Texas.
- 8 July – Ella Laboriel, 81, singer and actress.
- 14 July – Elsa Aguirre, 95, actress from the Golden Age of Mexican Cinema.
- 26 July – Alfonso Sánchez Anaya, 85, deputy (1994–1997), governor of Tlaxcala (1999–2005), and senator (2006–2012).
- 27 July – Samara Colina, 33–34, Guanajuato-based artist.
- 28 July – Pablo Garrido, 88, athlete who took the Olympic Oath at the 1968 Olympic Games.
- 29 July – Javier Martín del Campo, 75, rock musician (La Revolución de Emiliano Zapata).

=== August ===
- 5 August – Tomás Parra, 88 or 89, painter and sculptor, part of the Generación de la Ruptura.
- 6 August – Carlos Garfias Merlos, 75, prelate of the Roman Catholic Church, archbishop of Acapulco and of Morelia.
- 8 August – Diana La Cazadora, 48, wrestler.
- 10 August – Miguel Mancera, 93, economist, governor of the Bank of Mexico.
- 11 August – Vicente Quirarte, 72, writer and academic (UNAM), member of the Colegio Nacional and the Mexican Academy of Language.
- 20 August – Carlos Reyes López, 69, politician from Chihuahua, federal deputy in 2006–2009.
- 21 August – Jesús Martínez Álvarez, 81, governor of Oaxaca (1985–1986).

=== September ===
- 1 September –
  - Geles Cabrera, 100, sculptor.
  - Jonathan Meléndez, 38, keyboardist (Camilo Séptimo).
- 4 September – Zenyazen Escobar García, 42, Morena politician, federal deputy for Veracruz's 16th.
- 17 September – Anay Beltrán Reyes, 44, deputy (since 2024).
- 30 September – Jorge Kahwagi, 58, former boxer and member of the Chamber of Deputies.

=== October ===
- 27 October – Fernando Serrano Migallón, 81, jurist, member of the Mexican Academy of Language.
- 28 October – Cuauhtémoc Cárdenas, 92, head of government of Mexico City (1997–1999), governor of Michoacán (1980–1986) and senator (1976–1980).
- 29 October – Andrés Mendoza, 78, serial killer.

=== November ===
- 3 November – Carlos Albert, 83, footballer and TV analyst.
- 8 November – Arnaldo Coen, 86, visual artist (Generación de la Ruptura).
- 11 November – Regina Torné, 82, actress (The Big Cube, El Chavo del Ocho, Like Water for Chocolate).
- 15 November – Miguel Ángel Félix Gallardo, 80, drug lord of the Guadalajara Cartel (1970s–80s).
- 20 November – Luis Y. Aragón, 96, painter and sculptor.

== See also ==
- Outline of Mexico
- History of Mexico
