= Andrés Mendoza =

Andrés Mendoza may refer to:

- Andrés Hurtado de Mendoza, 3rd Marquis of Cañete (c. 1500–1561), Spanish military officer and fifth viceroy of Peru
- Andrés Mendoza (Peruvian footballer) (born 1978), Peruvian football player
- Andrés Mendoza (Ecuadorian footballer) (born 1989), Ecuadorian football player
- Andrés Mendoza (serial killer) (1947–2026), Mexican serial killer
