= National Electoral Institute contracting scandal =

Corruption scandal at Mexico's National Electoral Institute

The National Electoral Institute contracting scandal is a corruption scandal at Mexico's National Electoral Institute (INE) over the institute's purchases of electoral materials. It broke in October 2026 and led to the resignation of the INE's president, Guadalupe Taddei. On 19 October, the newspaper Reforma reported that an employee assigned as Taddei's driver held a power of attorney from one of the INE's suppliers. Further reports, and videos broadcast by the news site Latinus showed a close relationship between Taddei and the businessman José Alfredo Hernández Casillas, whose companies had received large contracts from the INE and from state electoral institutes. Taddei denied favoring any company, but announced her resignation on 25 October, the first head of the federal electoral authority to resign since its creation in 1990.

The contracts at the center of the case went to a group of firms that the press identified with Hernández Casillas and his brother, two of which the Financial Intelligence Unit (UIF) had blocked in 2023 over suspected money laundering before courts lifted the freeze. Among them was a direct award of up to MX$198.7 million for ballot boxes and voting screens for the 2025 judicial election. Taddei had signed a contract with one of the firms as head of the electoral institute of Sonora in 2021, and a former INE director of administration had earlier represented two of them.

After her resignation, the Superior Audit Office of the Federation (ASF), the INE's internal comptroller, and the UIF opened or expanded investigations. The ASF reported that two business groups had done MX$8,870 million of business with public bodies between 2014 and 2026, and the UIF blocked 25 individuals and 15 companies linked to electoral suppliers. Opposition parties, the UIF and the INE itself filed criminal complaints with the Attorney General's Office, and Latinus released recordings in which Hernández Casillas, speaking to Taddei, discussed dividing the proceeds of an INE contract. Thirty officials close to Taddei left the institute, which an interim president, Blanca Cruz García, led while the Chamber of Deputies negotiated over a successor.

The scandal broke months before the 2027 midterm elections, which the INE was organizing. President Claudia Sheinbaum said that Taddei had "betrayed the trust of the people of Mexico" and argued that the supplier network dated from earlier administrations of the institute, while opposition parties and commentators held Sheinbaum's party Morena responsible for Taddei's appointment and for the expanded powers of the presidency she had been awarded.

== Background ==
=== INE presidency ===
The National Electoral Institute (INE) is Mexico's autonomous electoral authority. It is governed by a General Council of eleven voting members, whose president is elected by a two-thirds vote of the Chamber of Deputies, or by lot if that majority cannot be reached. Until 2024, senior appointments within the institute needed the votes of eight councilors. A reform published in October that year allowed the INE president, acting alone, to appoint the executive directors and the heads of the technical units, including the directorate of administration, which handles contracting. The council challenged the change in court, but the action was dismissed by the Supreme Court in January 2026.

=== Guadalupe Taddei ===
Taddei began her career in electoral administration at the Federal Electoral Institute (IFE), the INE's predecessor, in 1992. She presided over Sonora's electoral institute from 2014 to 2021 and then over the state's transparency institute. On 31 March 2023, after the parliamentary groups failed to agree on candidates, she was drawn by lot as president of the INE for a nine-year term, the first woman to lead the institute. Mexico News Daily described her at the time as having family links to the federal government and to the National Regeneration Movement (Morena). President Andrés Manuel López Obrador praised her as "honest", while the National Action Party (PAN) said it would challenge her appointment. Her relations with the other councilors were strained from the start: in June 2023 the council rejected Flavio Cienfuegos, her nominee for executive secretary, by six votes to five.

=== Hernández Casillas firms ===
The brothers José Alfredo and Raymundo Francisco Hernández Casillas own a group of companies that make ballot boxes, folding voting screens, security stationery and ballots, among them Cajas Graf and Corporativo Zeg. Reforma reported that Cajas Graf alone signed contracts worth more than MX$500 million with thirteen state electoral institutes between 2021 and 2024. The group had already drawn official attention. In November 2023, at the request of the Attorney General's Office (FGR), the Financial Intelligence Unit (UIF) placed Cajas Graf, Corporativo Zeg, and both brothers on its list of blocked persons on suspicion of money laundering. The courts later lifted the freeze without ruling on whether the funds were lawful.

== Disclosures and resignation ==
=== Early reporting ===
In February 2026, the Superior Audit Office of the Federation (ASF) reported possible irregularities of MX$66.56 million in INE purchases for the 2024 general election and the 2025 judicial election. Most of the sum concerned a MX$63.24 million contract with Comercializadora JVLY for training materials for mock elections, whose payments had passed to third parties that could not be tied to the service. Excélsior later reported that JVLY belonged to the Hernández Casillas group, and that the ASF's inspectors, sent to JVLY's supposed workshops, had found themselves at the premises of another of the group's companies. The same month, audit findings that MX$672 million had been spent in 2025 on ballots that were never used led councilors Martín Faz and Dania Ravel to blame Taddei; Faz said that "absolute responsibility" lay with the president.

Reforma also reported in February that the INE's acting director of administration, Jesús Octavio García González, had previously been the legal representative of both Cajas Graf and Corporativo Zeg. He had been reported to the internal comptroller in January for conflict of interest, and left the post in April. On 7 May 2026, Jorge Monroy of Latinus questioned Taddei if she had been asked to sign tailored contracts, to which Taddei called the reporter majadero ('disrespectful') and said that if there were any irregularities, they should be reported.

=== Driver report ===
The scandal broke on 19 October, when Reforma reported that a man officially assigned as Taddei's driver had held a general power of attorney from Corporativo Zeg since June 2023. The newspaper said that the UIF had investigated the two companies for alleged links to organized crime; in court the UIF had described their funds as the proceeds of illicit activity. Two days later, the newspaper reported that the UIF was investigating seven of the group's suppliers to the INE and the state institutes for simulated competition, moving money through intermediary firms, and the use of invoice mills, companies that sell invoices for transactions that never took place.

Ricardo Monreal, Morena's leader in the Chamber of Deputies, asked the INE's internal comptroller to investigate. On 20 October, President Claudia Sheinbaum said that the INE "has to clarify this case", and suggested that the ASF review the contracts. That night, Latinus broadcast a video of Taddei with José Alfredo Hernández Casillas at an Independence Day celebration, at which the two toasted friendship and loyalty.

Taddei answered the next day in a statement read to the press, without taking questions. "This presidency has no favorite companies", she said. She acknowledged that the people named in the reports had worked at the INE but said they no longer did, and denied that the man described as her driver had held that job. She referred the matter to the internal comptroller, announced a public portal for the institute's contracts, and asked the ASF to audit the tenders again, but did not address her relationship with Hernández Casillas.

=== Mounting pressure ===
At an extraordinary session of the General Council on 22 October, the representatives of the opposition parties SOMOS and the Institutional Revolutionary Party (PRI) asked Taddei to step aside while the allegations were investigated. Councilors Arturo Castillo, Carla Humphrey, and Arturo Chávez asked her to explain her ties to Hernández Casillas. Castillo said that leaving was "a decision she must take personally", and blamed the 2024 reform for concentrating appointments in her hands. Taddei told the session that the institute would "not give in to pressure, disparagement, or attacks". The same day, citing INE sources, Reforma reported that Hernández Casillas had organized two parties for Taddei's 2025 birthday, attended by officials responsible for approving contracts.

On 23 October, the ASF said that it had "evidence and indications" of irregular contracting, possible conflicts of interest, collusion, and triangulation of funds. It opened an investigation into the INE, the state electoral institutes, and the companies and officials connected with them. The weekly Zeta reported that the ASF had established irregularities worth MX$514 million in contracts with the companies, while noting that the ASF's statement gave no amounts. Sheinbaum said there "must be no shadow of corruption at the INE", but declined to call for Taddei's resignation: "that is up to her". That evening, Latinus aired footage, which it said Hernández Casillas had recorded himself, of the businessman with one of Taddei's sons in a hotel suite in Paris.

By 24 October, opposition leaders were demanding her resignation. The PRI president, Alejandro Moreno, called her "the symbol of democratic degradation", and Jorge Triana, the PAN's national spokesperson coordinator, said she should be replaced by someone "truly independent". Within Morena, Monreal said the party "will not cover for anyone", and its deputy leader in the Chamber, Alfonso Ramírez Cuéllar, said that a resignation would not be enough. Taddei held out. Reforma reported that she had told the councilors in a video call that day that she would not resign, describing the allegations as a political attack.

=== Resignation ===
The next day, 25 October, Taddei announced her resignation, saying that it followed "deep reflection" and that "protecting the institute, and allowing it to continue fulfilling its constitutional mission, must always take precedence over any circumstantial or personal interest". She admitted no wrongdoing. Her statement said that "rumors, fabricated material, leaks, and versions of events" had spread through the media, that "each allegation must be examined with evidence and through institutional channels", and that her departure relieved no one of the duty to clarify the facts. She sent her resignation to the Chamber of Deputies on 26 October. It was the first time a president of the federal electoral authority had resigned since its predecessor was founded in 1990, and Reuters called it "the most high-profile departure tied to alleged corruption" in Sheinbaum's presidency.

Sheinbaum said that Taddei had made "a good decision" and that any misuse of public resources should be investigated, while condemning what she called the "misogynist" mockery of Taddei's private life. On 27 October, the ten remaining councilors unanimously chose Blanca Yassahara Cruz García as provisional president. Taddei did not speak publicly in the days that followed.

=== Post-resignation recordings ===
In November, Latinus released recordings of conversations between Hernández Casillas and Taddei, which it said he had made himself as "life insurance" against his former associates. The first was published on 2 November; Animal Político dated the meeting to 16 February 2026. In it Hernández Casillas, seated across from Taddei, works through figures on a notepad and says that the proceeds after costs would be split "70 Ramón and 30 us", about US$15 million. Latinus linked the conversation to the INE's largest contract, a MX$1,173 million award for producing voter identity cards, which the councilors later included in their review of all contracts. Only Hernández Casillas is heard speaking in the published excerpts, and Animal Político noted that they did not establish that any payment had been made.

A second set, released on 5 November, showed the relationship breaking down in early 2026, according to Latinus. In it, Hernández Casillas says he had warned Taddei that statements of his were stored in Europe, the United States, and Canada and would be released "if something happens to me". He also refers to an undisclosed matter concerning the Interior Ministry. Publimetro noted that the accusations in the videos did not amount to legally established responsibility.

== Contracts under scrutiny ==
The reporting focused on two contracts, both of which went directly to the Hernández Casillas companies: one that Taddei signed in Sonora before she joined the INE, and one that the INE awarded during her presidency for the 2025 judicial election.

=== Sonora electoral materials (2021) ===
The earliest documented contract between Taddei and the Hernández Casillas companies dates from her time in Sonora. In February 2021, the state's electoral institute awarded Cajas Graf a MX$46.8 million tender for electoral materials. The only other bidder, Formas Finas y Materiales, was also one of the brothers' companies, so the two "competing" offers came from the same owners. On 5 March, Taddei, as the institute's president, signed the contract; José Alfredo Hernández Casillas signed it for Cajas Graf.

=== Judicial election materials (2025) ===
The largest INE contract to be questioned was for ballot boxes, voting screens and marking equipment for the 2025 judicial election. The INE first put it out to tender. Three companies bid: Cajas Graf, Corporativo Zeg and TOL Producciones, which Reforma linked to the same family. The tender was declared void, and on 6 March 2025, the INE instead gave the contract directly, without a new tender, to Cajas Graf and TOL Producciones, for up to MX$198.7 million. Some outlets, citing Reforma, gave a slightly lower figure of MX$195 million to MX$197.6 million and named Zeg rather than TOL as the second company. Reforma also reported that TOL Producciones had declared an income of only MX$200,000 in 2024, the year before it shared the contract. Taddei defended the award. She said that the tender had failed because none of the bids met its requirements, and that the direct award was backed by market research and was needed to keep to the election timetable.

=== Tendering practices ===
The press reports and the audits described the same patterns. According to Reforma, the UIF was investigating the brothers' companies for staging competition between bidders, moving money through intermediary firms and using invoice mills. The investigative site Eme Equis documented tenders at several state electoral institutes in which the brothers' companies bid against one another, sometimes through the same legal representatives. The ASF, which referred to two business groups without naming them, said in October 2026 that winning bidders had subcontracted the work to companies that had bid against them, and that some firms had billed hundreds of millions of pesos while employing fewer than five people.

García González, the former director of administration, was not the only official to have worked on both sides. Infobae reported that two other officials whom Taddei brought into senior INE posts – Iliana Araceli Hernández Gómez, appointed the head of the Gender Equality Unit, and Claudia Arlett Espino, the institute's executive secretary until September 2026 – had earlier awarded contracts to the brothers' companies while working for the electoral institutes of Chihuahua and Oaxaca.

== Investigations ==
=== Internal comptroller ===
On 30 October, the INE's internal comptroller, Víctor Hugo Carvente Contreras, told two committees of the Chamber of Deputies that his office had 18 investigation files on the matter. Five had reached the stage of administrative-responsibility proceedings, which are decided by the Federal Court of Administrative Justice (TFJA). He declined to name the officials involved, and listed the presumed misconduct as including acting under a conflict of interest, diversion of resources, simulated compliance with contracting requirements and abuse of functions.

=== Audit office ===
The same day, the head of the ASF, Aureliano Hernández Palacios, presented the office's preliminary findings to the Chamber of Deputies. Two business groups, he said, had done MX$8,870.3 million of business with public bodies between 2014 and 2026, of which MX$3,790.3 million was with electoral authorities: MX$430 million with the INE and the rest with state electoral institutes. He spoke of "networks of links between both groups and officials". Animal Político noted that the sums were presented as the value of operations identified, not as a determined loss to the treasury. On 4 November, the ASF set out three lines of work: a review of the INE's contracting procedures, a study of electoral bodies' purchases since 2000, and a comprehensive audit of the INE and of the federal funds spent by state institutes. The next day, it published a diagram of seven companies, 83 people and 89 links between them, which it described as leads rather than proven irregularities. The INE's General Council, meanwhile, unanimously asked the ASF for an emergency audit of its acquisitions, leases, and services from 2016 to 2026. "Let nothing go unreviewed," said councilor Carla Humphrey, who proposed it.

=== Financial Intelligence Unit ===
On 4 November, the Finance Ministry announced that the UIF had added 25 individuals and 15 companies "linked to electoral suppliers" to its list of blocked persons and had filed a complaint with the FGR. It described the listing as an administrative and precautionary measure that did "not imply a definitive determination of liability", and did not name those affected. El Universal, La Jornada, and Milenio reported, citing unnamed sources, that Taddei and the Hernández Casillas brothers were among them. The head of the UIF, Omar Reyes Colmenares, declined to confirm any names, saying that the list was confidential and that the information formed part of a criminal investigation file.

=== Criminal complaints ===
The PAN filed a criminal complaint with the FGR on 27 October against Taddei and unnamed officials, businesspeople and companies. It alleged offenses including bribery, embezzlement, money laundering, and criminal association, and asked the FGR to merge all related complaints into a single investigation. The PRI filed its own complaint on 4 November against Taddei, Hernández Casillas and two former INE officials. The INE's councilors agreed on 3 November to file a complaint of their own; the INE's interim president, Cruz García, said it would name no individuals but would not exclude Taddei. The institute filed it on 6 November, asking the FGR to investigate "without distinction of persons, posts, responsibilities, or periods of administration"; its announcement named no one and specified no contracts or amounts. The same day, the internal comptroller told the Chamber of Deputies that it had filed six criminal complaints against current and former INE officials and companies, alleging offenses including bribery, influence peddling, use of false documents, and unlawful use of powers. It had also summoned eight officials to the first hearings of its administrative proceedings.

Councilor Arturo Castillo and Alfonso Ramírez Cuéllar, Morena's deputy leader in the Chamber, both said publicly that Taddei should be held in pre-trial detention or jailed. Sheinbaum said on 3 November that once the ASF had finished its audit, criminal matters would go to the FGR and administrative ones to the administrative court.

== Aftermath ==
=== Interim leadership and departures ===
As interim president, Blanca Cruz García began by suspending all new contract awards while the procedures under way were reviewed. She announced that three directors had resigned at the councilors' request, and said that she would make no appointments on her own authority: "Management structures must answer to institutional needs ... never to personal loyalties." Her own record drew questions. Excélsior reported that Comercializadora JVLY had received MX$129.7 million in 2024 from Puebla's electoral institute, which she then headed; asked about her time in Puebla, she said she had "nothing to hide" and was open to having her record reviewed.

By 3 November, 30 officials appointed by or close to Taddei had resigned. Seventeen came from the former president's office, among them her chief of staff; the others included the heads of the information technology and gender equality units, the national communications coordinator, and the director of material resources. The authorities have not said that any of those who resigned were involved in the alleged irregularities.

=== Succession ===
To replace Taddei, the Chamber of Deputies must choose from a shortlist of five drawn up by a technical evaluation committee. If no candidate obtains a two-thirds majority, the president is chosen by lot from the shortlist, and if that fails, by the Supreme Court. The Chamber's Political Coordination Board (Jucopo) began the process on 26 October. Its draft call, open only to women, would have the winner serve out Taddei's term to April 2032, and required applicants to declare possible conflicts of interest and relevant business relationships, though it set out no way of verifying them.

On 3 November, the Jucopo failed to agree on the call after the PAN proposed eight amendments, among them observers from Congress and civil society on the evaluation committee and safeguards against leaked examinations. Ricardo Monreal, Morena's leader in the Chamber and chair of the Jucopo, pushed back the expected vote from 9 December to 13 or 14 December. He said he preferred a consensus but would rely on Morena's majority if necessary: "There is total distrust, of everyone against everyone."

=== Effect on the 2027 elections ===
The scandal came as the INE was preparing the 2027 midterm elections, and Reuters wrote that it raised "fresh questions over the credibility and leadership" of the institute. Sheinbaum said that the elections were "not in doubt". When the interim president froze new contracts, the materials for the elections had not yet been bought; she said that the transition would not halt the preparations. On 29 October, she said that the councilors would review every contract in force and rescind any found to be irregular, and the council's resolution of 5 November included an emergency purchasing plan to keep procurement for the elections on schedule.

=== Proposed reforms ===
Several proposals sought to undo the concentration of power in the INE's presidency. Councilor Carla Humphrey asked Congress to strip the presidency of what she called its "superpower" to appoint the whole Executive Board. In late October, senators from the PAN and the PRI introduced separate bills to reverse the 2024 change, and a third came from the Morena senators Javier Corral and Susana Harp, together with Amalia García of Citizens' Movement. Corral said that Morena had to accept its share of responsibility, because the reform that gave Taddei "almost absolute powers" had been incubated in the Senate. In the Chamber of Deputies, the PAN pressed for its own version, restoring the requirement of eight council votes for senior appointments. Ricardo Monreal said that he favored returning those powers to the council, though he said that this would require a constitutional amendment.

Sheinbaum's proposals went in another direction. She suggested that the state printer, Talleres Gráficos de México, already a member of the consortium producing the voter identity cards, supply most electoral materials in the future, and said that a comprehensive electoral reform could be discussed once the 2027 electoral process had concluded. The columnist Salvador Camarena called the printer proposal "a trap" that would make the independent electoral authority more dependent on the government.

== Reactions ==
=== Government and Morena ===
Morena distanced itself from Taddei. Its national president, Ariadna Montiel, said on 27 October that "the INE affair is not Morena's responsibility" and, on 3 November, called Taddei "indefensible". Sheinbaum said that Taddei had "betrayed the trust of the people of Mexico". She noted that Taddei had been appointed to head Sonora's electoral institute in 2014, under a PAN governor, by the INE General Council then led by Lorenzo Córdova: "Guadalupe Taddei comes from there." In the Senate on 28 October, Morena senators likewise blamed Córdova, and Gerardo Fernández Noroña blamed Santiago Creel of the PAN, who as president of the Chamber of Deputies had presided over the 2023 drawing of lots. On 5 November, Anti-corruption Secretary Raquel Buenrostro presented contracts worth MX$2,094 million awarded to the network between 2014 and 2023 and MX$646 million in 2024–2025, and Sheinbaum said that the irregularities should not be attributed solely to Taddei's administration. The next day, she suggested that the slogan "El INE no se toca" (lit. 'the INE is not to be touched'), used by opponents of her government's electoral reforms, had served "to protect this whole electoral mafia".

=== Opposition ===
The opposition held Morena responsible for Taddei's appointment. The PRI president, Alejandro Moreno, said that Taddei "is Morena", and that her resignation should not be used to "impose another person close to Morena"; Mexico, he said, could not go into the 2027 elections "with an electoral authority whose impartiality is in serious question". The PAN's leader, Jorge Romero, said: "If contracts were rigged, we are very concerned that elections will be rigged as well." Citizens' Movement recalled that it had been the only group to vote against choosing councilors by lot in 2023. In the Senate on 28 October, PAN senators blamed Sonora's governor, Alfonso Durazo of Morena, for Taddei's rise and replayed former president López Obrador's 2023 endorsement of her. Córdova replied that the INE had been one of the most audited institutions in the country during his presidency, and accused Sheinbaum of trying to deflect the governing party's responsibility.

=== Civil society and commentators ===
The employers' federation Coparmex said that a resignation was not enough, and called for an investigation and a successor marked by independence and impartiality. The former IFE president Luis Carlos Ugalde called the affair "severe damage" that had begun before Taddei, and argued against "wiping the slate clean". The journalist Julián Andrade argued that, although Taddei had been chosen by lot, all five finalists in the 2023 draw were close to the governing coalition, so that political responsibility lay with those who had promoted her. The political scientists María Amparo Casar and Jesús Silva-Herzog Márquez attributed the crisis to the concentration of power in the INE's president, which Silva-Herzog called the institute's "presidentialization". The columnist Salvador Camarena described Sheinbaum's account of Taddei's origins as a "myth". La Jornada dismissed some of Taddei's accusers, among them former INE officials now in SOMOS, as motivated by "revanchism", while insisting that she still had to answer every allegation.

== See also ==
- Corruption in Mexico
