= Guadalupe Taddei =

Mexican civil servant

President of the National Electoral Institute
- In office 4 April 2023 – 26 October 2026
- Preceded by: Lorenzo Córdova
- Succeeded by: Blanca Cruz García

Personal details
- Born: Guadalupe Taddei Zavala; 26 June 1963 (age 63) Cananea, Sonora, Mexico
- Education: Universidad de Sonora

Guadalupe Taddei Zavala (born 26 June 1963) is a Mexican civil servant who was the president of the National Electoral Institute from 2023 to 2026. Taddei previously served as the president of the Electoral Institute of Sonora.

Taddei resigned from her position on 26 October 2026 amid allegations of corruption and embezzlement.

== Early life and education ==
Guadalupe Taddei Zavala was born in Cananea, Sonora, on 26 June 1963. She studied public administration at the Universidad de Sonora.

== Career ==
=== Federal Electoral Institute ===
She began working at the Federal Electoral Institute (IFE) in 1992, as the electoral coordinator for Chihuahua and Durango.

The following year, she became regional director of the vote-counting center for Aguascalientes, director of the National Electoral Consultation System of the Federal Voters Registry at the IFE in 2002, and State Electoral Registry Officer on the Local Executive Board of the IFE, between 2003 and 2014.

In 2014, she became the president of the Electoral Institute of Sonora, a position she held until 2021. Before her tenure, the IFE became the National Electoral Institute (INE). Following her tenure, she was named president of the Sonora Institute for Transparency for a seven-year period.

=== President of the INE ===
On 31 March 2023, after the Chamber of Deputies failed to reach the two-thirds majority required to appoint a candidate, Taddei was selected as President of the INE by lottery from a shortlist of five finalists. She took office on 4 April 2023 for a nine-year term ending in 2032, succeeding Lorenzo Córdova and becoming the first woman to lead the institute.

==== Contracting scandal and resignation ====
In October 2026, Reforma reported that an employee assigned as Taddei's driver held a power of attorney from Corporativo Zeg, one of a group of electoral-materials suppliers owned by the businessman José Alfredo Hernández Casillas and his brother, whose companies had received large contracts from the INE and from state electoral institutes. Videos broadcast by the news site Latinus showed Taddei with Hernández Casillas at private gatherings. Taddei denied favoring any company, but announced her resignation on 25 October, the first head of the federal electoral authority to resign since 1990. She admitted no wrongdoing, and said that each allegation should be examined "with evidence and through institutional channels". After her resignation, the Superior Audit Office of the Federation, the INE's internal comptroller and the Financial Intelligence Unit (UIF) opened or expanded investigations, and opposition parties, the UIF, and the INE itself filed criminal complaints with the Attorney General's Office.

== Allegations of nepotism and conflict of interests ==
Taddei and her family have faced criticism over allegations of nepotism and potential conflicts of interest during elections.

Several of her family members hold government positions in the federal government and the state of Sonora. These include Luis Rogelio Pineda Taddei, her son, who was private secretary to Governor of Sonora Alfonso Durazo in 2025–2026; Jorge Luis Taddei Bringas, her cousin, delegate at the Secretariat of Welfare in Sonora; Pablo Daniel Taddei Arriola, Jorge's son and Guadalupe's nephew, director of LitioMX; or Ivana Celeste Taddei Arriola, Pablo's sister, a member of the Congress of Sonora, among others.

== Accolades ==
On 19 October 2021, Taddei received the Sonoran Women's Empowerment Medal for her career.
