= Leonardo Valdés Zurita =

Mexican scholar

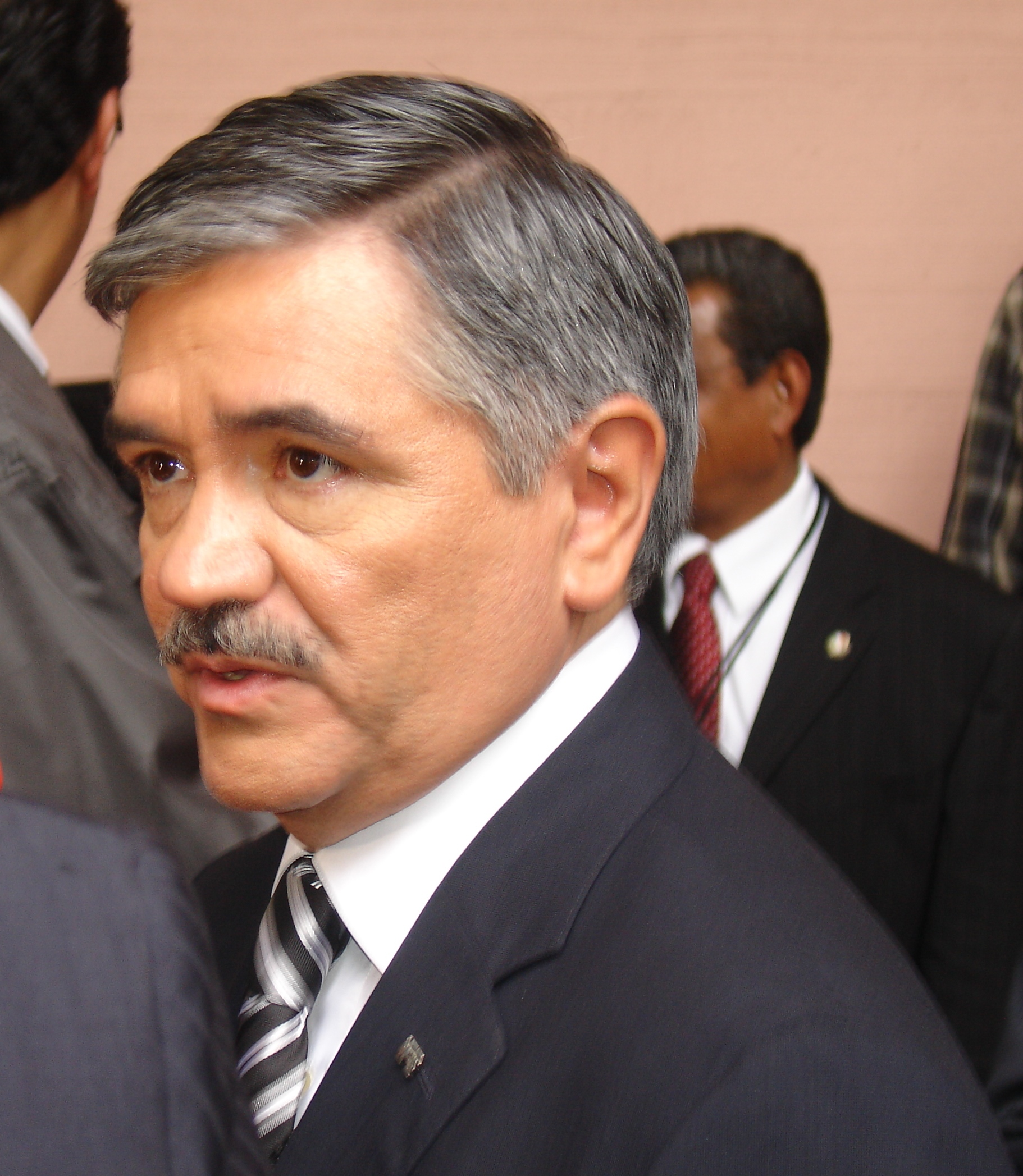
Leonardo Valdés Zurita

Leonardo Valdés Zurita is a Mexican scholar who served from February 2008 to October 2013 as the last president of the Federal Electoral Institute, before it was replaced by the National Electoral Institute under president Enrique Peña Nieto. He grew up in Mexico City.

Preceded by Andrés Albo	President of the Federal Electoral Institute; 2008 — 2013	Succeeded by Lorenzo Córdova Vianello
