= Dwight Worker =

Prison escapee

Dwight Worker is an American who escaped from the Lecumberri prison in Mexico City, Mexico. He was incarcerated after being convicted of attempting to smuggle cocaine. On December 17, 1975, two years into his 7-year sentence, he walked out of the prison disguised as a woman. He and his wife Barbara later wrote a book, Escape (ISBN 0-913374-76-8), about the experience, and a made-for-TV movie was released in 1980. In May 2012, the National Geographic show Locked Up Abroad aired an episode (season 07 episode 07) about Worker's story.
