= Salvador Castañeda Álvarez =

Mexican writer and guerrilla (1946–2026

Salvador Castañeda
- Born: 31 July 1946; Matamoros, Coahuila, Mexico
- Died: 1 April 2026 (aged 79)
- Education: UNAM, PFUR
- Occupations: Writer; cultural functionary
- Writing career
- Notable work: ¿Por qué no dijiste todo?
- Notable awards: Juan Grijalbo Novel Prize (1979)

Salvador Castañeda Álvarez (Note: In this Mexican name, the surname is Castañeda and the second or maternal family name is Álvarez.) (31 July 1946 – 1 April 2026) was a Mexican writer and cultural functionary. He was also a founding member of the Revolutionary Action Movement (Movimiento de Acción Revolucionaria) guerrilla group, on account of which he was incarcerated for seven years in Lecumberri Prison.

== Life and career ==
Salvador Castañeda Álvarez was born on an ejido in the municipality of Matamoros, Coahuila, on 31 July 1946. He studied geological engineering at the National Autonomous University of Mexico (UNAM) and agronomy at the Patrice Lumumba Peoples' Friendship University in Moscow. Upon returning to Mexico, he was one of the founders of Movimiento de Acción Revolucionaria guerrilla group, active during the Mexican Dirty War of the 1960s and 1970s. Because of his involvement with the rebels, Castañeda was arrested and detained in Mexico City's Lecumberri Prison from 1971 to 1978.

During his incarceration, he discovered his vocation as a writer. He was the recipient of an National Institute of Fine Arts (INBA) scholarship for narrative writing in 1978 and his first published work, ¿Por qué no dijiste todo? – a novel based on his time in prison and the events leading to his arrest – won him the Juan Grijalbo Novel Prize in 1979. He was later the assistant director for publications at the INBA's National Centre for Literature Information and Promotion (CNIPL) and led writers' workshops in numerous universities and cities around the country.

Castañeda died on 1 April 2026, at the age of 79.

== Work ==
Castañeda's writings were published in a range of newspapers and periodicals, including El Financiero, Excélsior, Proceso and Unomásuno.

His published books included:

- ¿Por qué no dijiste todo? (Grijalbo, 1980)
- Los diques del tiempo (diario desde la cárcel) (UNAM, 1991)
- La patria celestial (Cal y Arena, 1992)
- El de ayer es Él (Ediciones El Aduanero, 1996)
- Papel revolución (Ayuntamiento de Torreón, 2000)
- Diario bastardo (Instituto Coahuilense de Cultura, 2004)
