= Exclusive economic zone of Mexico =

Mexico's has the 13th largest exclusive economic zone with a total surface area of 3,269,386 km^{2} (1,262,317 sq mi), and places Mexico among the countries with the largest areas in the world. When including the land area of 1,972,550 km^{2} (761,610 sq mi) it puts Mexico's total territory at 5,241,936 km^{2} (2,023,923 sq mi).

== Geography ==
Exclusive economic zone of Mexico

Mexico's EEZ is located in the Pacific Ocean, Gulf of California and Gulf of Mexico. It borders with Guatemala, Belize and Honduras to the south, Cuba to the east and the United States to the north.

== See also ==
- Geography of Mexico
- Borders of Mexico
- Islands of Mexico
