= Camilo Séptimo =

Mexican musical group

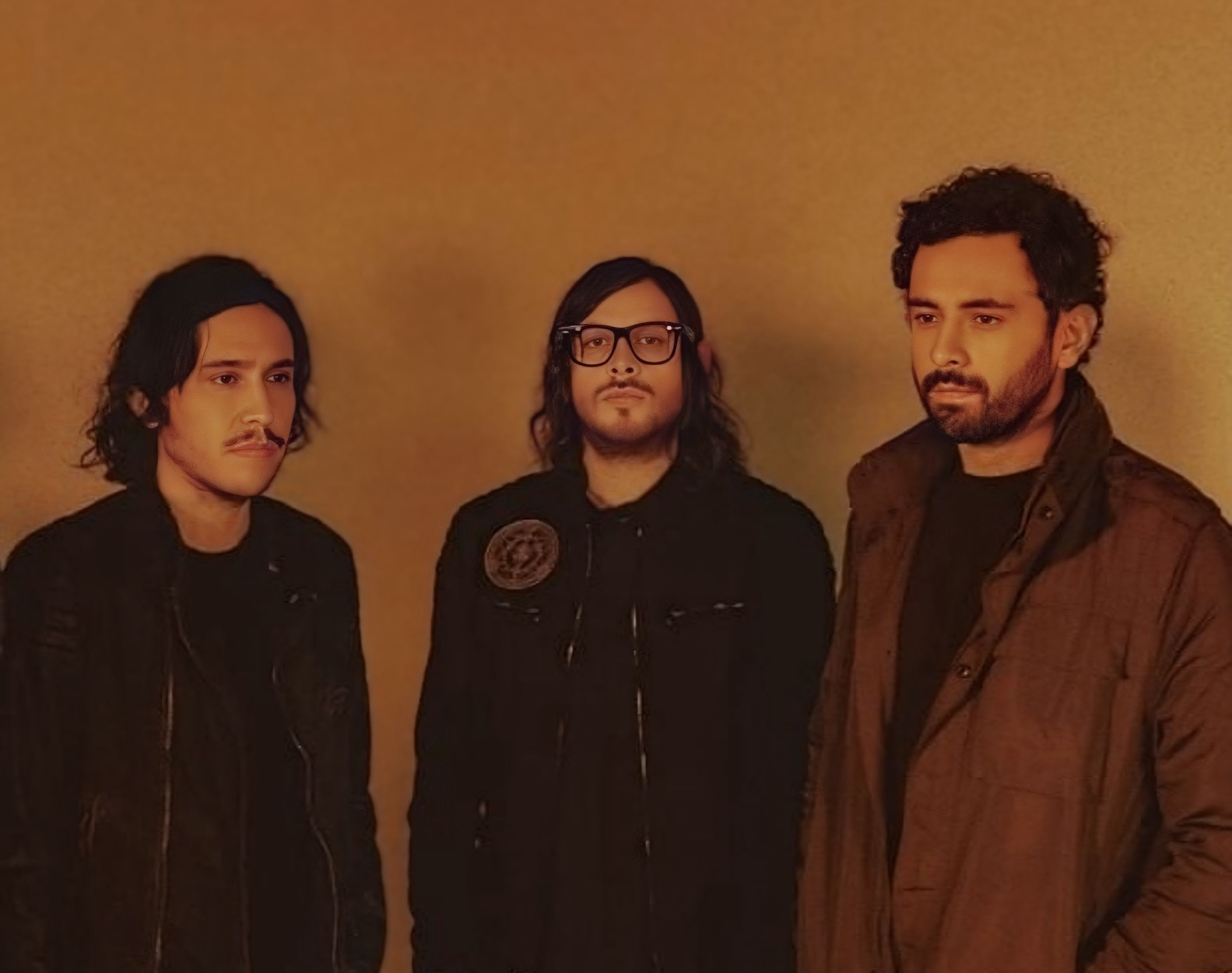
- (L–R); Vázquez, Mendoza and Meléndez.

Background information
- Also known as: CVII, Camilo VII
- Origin: Mexico City, Mexico
- Genres: Synth-pop; indie rock; chillwave; indie pop
- Years active: 2013–present
- Label: Warner Chappell
- Members: Manuel Mendoza; Erik Vázquez
- Past members: Jonathan Meléndez
- Website: Official website

Camilo Séptimo (also written as Camilo VII, abbreviated as CVII) is a Mexican synth-pop and indie rock band from Mexico City. It was formed by Manuel Mendoza (vocals and bass), Jonathan Meléndez (keyboards), and Erik Vázquez (guitar) in 2013. Although these are the only three official members, several other musicians perform with the band live, especially Marco Alarcón (drums), César Cardiel (drums), and Claudio Cruz (percussions).

They have been nominated for several awards, including two nominations at the IMAs for New Artist and Song of the Year with "No confíes en mí" in 2015, and one nomination at the MTV MIAW Awards for Video of the Year with "Inevitable" in 2022. They took their name as a reference to the Spanish singer Camilo Sesto.

The group emerged after the dissolution of Lady Lane, the predecessor band to Camilo Séptimo, in which Manuel and Erik participated. Later, they recorded a series of folk demos created by Manuel in his home studio. From these sessions came their first single, titled "Portales", which received attention in the media, where the melodic quality of the vocals, the production, and the texture of the musical instruments were highlighted. After the release of the promotional video, the band presented "No confíes en mí" as their second single. This composition helped them rise to fame, introducing styles such as new wave and math rock.

They have recorded four studio albums: Óleos (2017), Navegantes (2019), Ecos (2022), and Jardín de las almas (2023). They also have an extended play: Maya (2014). They have participated in major events such as Vive Latino, Pa'l Norte, Tecate Coordenada, and Sonorama Ribera, and have performed at cultural venues like the Palacio de los Deportes and the Teatro Metropólitan in Mexico City, as well as at numerous prominent festivals in South America and Europe. They have also collaborated with artists like Ximena Sariñana, Luis de Los Misioneros, Porter, Samanta Barrón, and Francisca Valenzuela. Throughout their career, they have experimented with the fusion of various musical genres, ranging from jazz and rhythm and blues to rock, pop, and electronic music. They are influenced by performers such as Devendra Banhart, Daft Punk, and Arctic Monkeys. They have shared the stage with Kings of Leon, Belle and Sebastian, Dorian, and Dënver. In 2023, they participated in a musical session for Amazon Music.

Meléndez was shot and killed at his residence on September 1, 2026, at the age of 38. Also killed were his pregnant wife, a three year old child, a household worker and a dog. A 6-year-old child at the scene was unharmed. Police announced two suspects had been arrested a few days later, one of whom had an established professional relationship with Meléndez.

== History ==
=== 2013-2016: First years and Maya ===
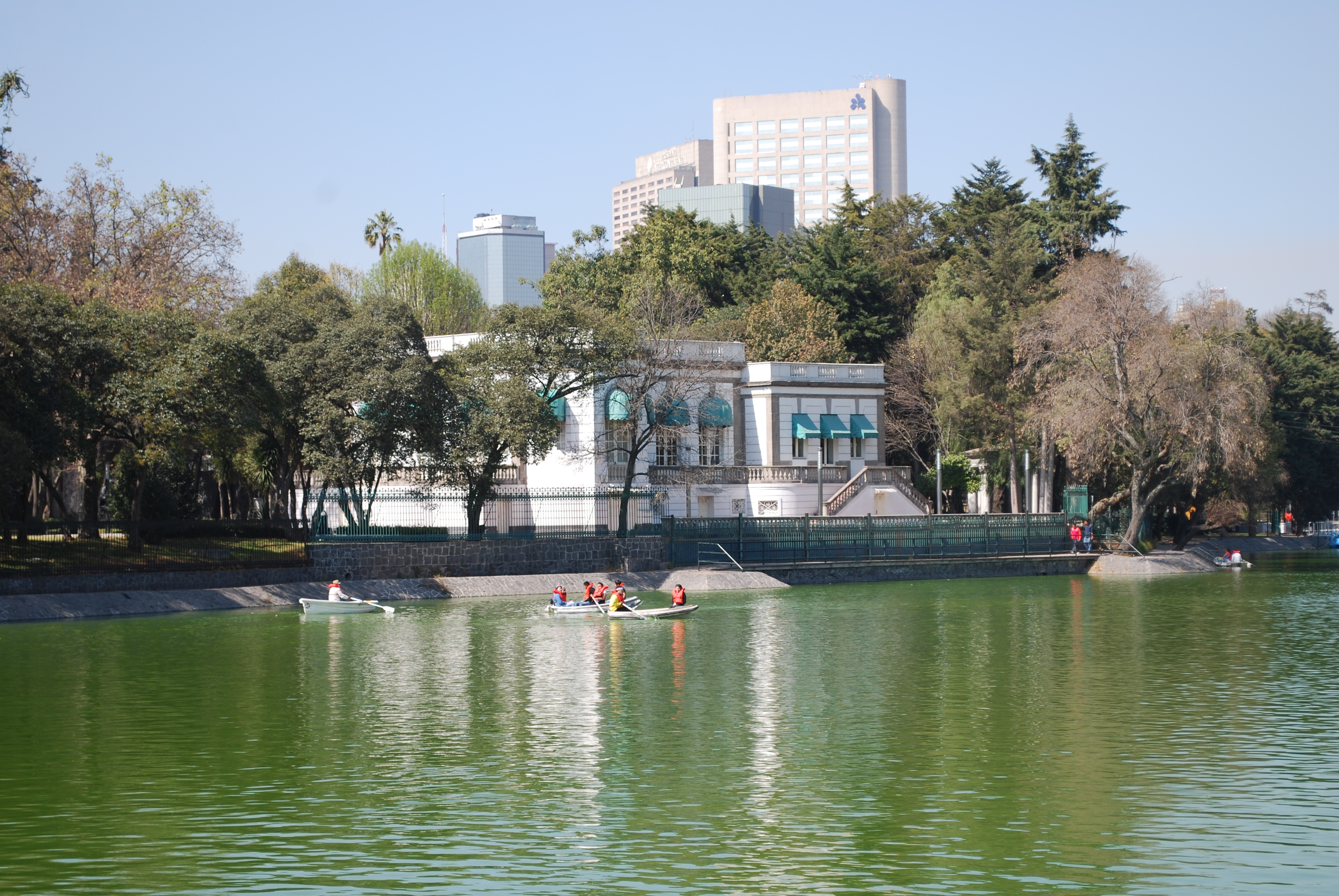
The venue where they presented their debut EP, Maya, was Casa del Lago,.

They officially began meeting in 2013 after the dissolution of Lady Lane, a band in which vocalist Manuel Mendoza and guitarist Erik Vázquez performed. By 2014, the band was presenting their first extended play titled Maya at Casa del Lago, in front of an audience of over 400 people. The success of this performance led the group to participate in Vive Latino in 2015, just two years after their debut. In 2016, they announced the Neón Tour, a tour that included 38 shows in different cities across Mexico. During this tour, the band achieved sold-out performances in major independent music venues, such as the Centro Cultural España and the Lunario of the National Auditorium.

Camilo Séptimo began to gain recognition with the singles 'Portales' and 'No confíes en mi', which allowed them to perform at important venues such as the Teatro de la Ciudad Esperanza Iris, a renowned theater in Mexico City. The name of their mini-album Maya refers to the star Maia from the Pleiades, considered in various cultures as a mythical being associated with life. This extended play included five original tracks, including 'Maya,' 'Resplandor,' and 'Te veo en el 27'.

=== 2017-2018: Óleos ===
After several months of work, they released Óleos, their first studio album, from which several singles were released throughout 2016. Notable songs include "Eres", "Ser humano", and "Neón". Óleos addresses complex themes such as love, heartbreak, disillusionment, and hope. Critics have compared their style to that of the band Zoé, acknowledging the influence Zoé has had on new generations of artists. The production includes compositions like "Fusión" and "Miénteme", which aim to keep the listener's interest. Among the tracks, "Vicio" stood out for its emotional depth, while "Amanecer", one of the oldest songs on the album, has been reinterpreted with new musical arrangements.

During this period, they continued developing, producing singles that previewed their first full-length album. The singles included "Eres", "Neón" —a virtual reality video—, "Miénteme", which told a story of betrayal, and "Ser humano". With the release of the latter single, the band announced that Óleos would consist of 11 tracks, available on digital platforms starting March 31. The album's launch took place on May 13 with a special concert at Plaza Condesa, where several guests performed. Each ticket for this event included a copy of the album as part of a limited edition. The album was characterized by its composition of stories about love and heartbreak through cosmic and metaphysical metaphors.
