= Lorenzo Córdova =

Mexican lawyer

President of the National Electoral Institute
- In office 3 April 2014 – 3 April 2023
- Preceded by: Leonardo Valdés Zurita
- Succeeded by: Guadalupe Taddei

Personal details
- Born: 6 February 1972 (age 54) Mexico City
- Parent: Arnaldo Córdova (father)
- Education: UNAM

Lorenzo Córdova Vianello (Note: In this Spanish name, the first or paternal surname is Córdova and the second or maternal family name is Vianello.) (born 6 February 1972) is a Mexican academic who was the president of the National Electoral Institute (Spanish: Instituto Nacional Electoral, INE) from 2014 to 2023.

== Career ==
Córdova Vianello was born in Mexico City in 1972. He holds a law degree from the National Autonomous University of Mexico (UNAM) and a doctorate in political theory from the University of Turin, Italy.

On 3 April 2014, the Chamber of Deputies elected Córdova as the presiding counselor of the National Electoral Institute, for a period of 9 years. he had previously served as an electoral counselor of the Federal Electoral Institute, the INE's predecessor, since 2011.

He is a member of the Consejo Nacional de Ciencia y Tecnología.

== Bibliography ==
- Rights of the Mexican people. 2012 (co-authored with Jorge Sánchez Cordero ).
- Financing of political parties in Latin America. 2011.
- Formation and perspectives of the State in Mexico. 2010.
- Trends of constitutionalism in Ibero-America. 2009.

== See also ==
- Elections in Mexico
