= LitioMX =

Mexican state-owned lithium corporation

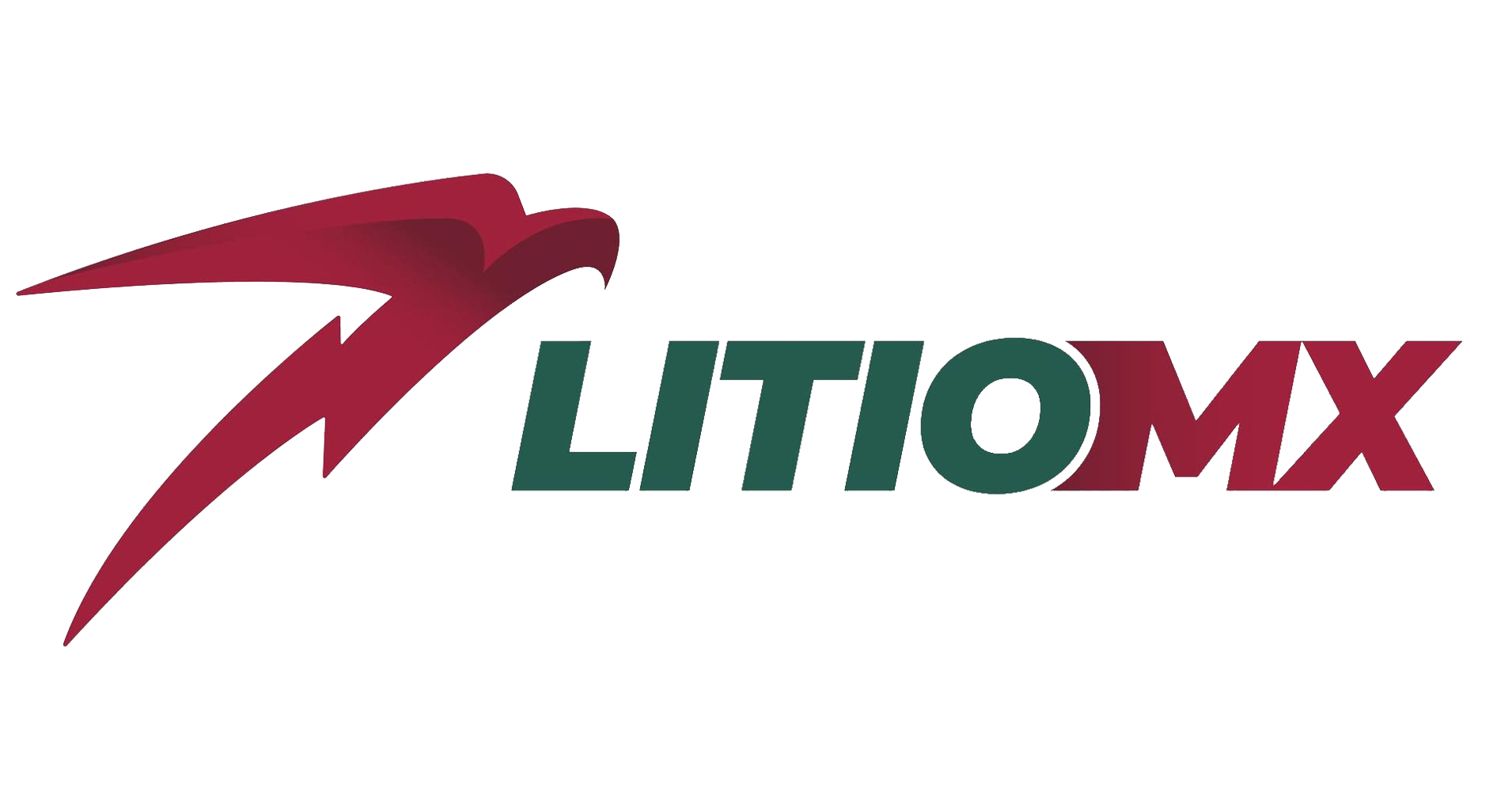
Logo

Litio para México (LitioMx) is a Mexican state-owned enterprise tasked with maintaining a national monopoly on lithium. It is organized as a public entity under the direction of the Secretariat of Energy and is tasked with the exploration, exploitation, and recovery of lithium on Mexican territory and control of the economic value chain of this mineral.

== History ==
In April 2022, Mexican President Andrés Manuel López Obrador sent a legislative proposal to the Congress of Mexico to reform the national mining law and establish that the government possesses a monopoly on the extraction and commercialization of lithium in the country, limiting the participation of the private sector in this activity. On 20 April, this reform was published in the Official Journal of the Federation.

On 23 August, the degree was published to create LitioMX, the state owned corporation responsible for administering the monopoly on lithium. On 30 August, the government stated that LitioMX would establish its headquarters in the state of Sonora and that the project would be supervised by the governor of the state, Alfonso Durazo Montaño. On 31 August, López Obrador stated that the company would be directed by Pablo Daniel Taddei.

Taddei later clarified that private sector investment in LitioMX would be welcomed, as long as the Mexican government retains a majority stake and control over any operations. The company announced that it would be exploring deposits in six states: Sonora, Chihuahua, Nayarit, Puebla, Jalisco, and Durango.
