= Murder of Claudia Tacoronte Aguilera =

2026 murder in Morelos, Mexico

- Date: September 12, 2026
- Time: 11:00 pm (UTC −6)
- Location: Cuautla, Morelos, Mexico
- Type: Homicide
- Motive: Robbery; possible femicide
- Deaths: 1

On Saturday, September 12, 2026, 21-year-old University of Granada student Claudia Tacoronte Aguilera, who was participating in an exchange program with the Autonomous University of the State of Morelos, was murdered in the course of an armed robbery in Cuautla, Morelos, Mexico.

== Background ==
=== Victim ===
Claudia Tacoronte Aguilera was a 21-year-old resident of Spain, originally from Gran Canaria in the Canary Islands. She was studying early childhood education at the University of Granada in Andalusia, and was staying in Mexico as part of an exchange program with the Autonomous University of the State of Morelos (UAEM). She had been in Morelos for a month at the time of her murder.

=== Femicide in Mexico ===
Mexico has one of the highest femicide rates of any country. Femicide victims make up around 1 out of every 34 murder victims in Mexico. Morelos has the second-highest rate of femicide of any Mexican state, with 21 feminicide victims in the first seven months of 2026, according to government statistics.

==== At the UAEM ====
Aguilera's murder marked the fourth murder among the UAEM student body in seven months. All of the victims of these murders were women.

== Murder ==
On September 12, 2026, the Casa de la Cultura, near Cuautla, was holding a festival devoted to medicinal plants. Aguilera was staying at the Casa de la Cultura overnight to participate, according to the state prosecutor. A statement by the Casa de la Cultura says: "Claudia came to this event with the desire to learn, connect with others, and be part of a community united around knowledge, medicinal plants, health, and collective care." At around 11:00 p.m. on the night of the 12th, Aguilera was attacked with a knife by an unknown assailant near where the festival was being held; she attempted to seek safety inside the Casa de la Cultura, but was pursued and stabbed. She was dead by the time first responders arrived on scene. According to CNN, the murder "reportedly" took place "during an armed robbery."

== Investigation ==
According to the prosecutor's office in Morelos, the case is being investigated as a possible femicide. According to a September 15 article from El Heraldo de México, law enforcement had obtained surveillance footage from near the Casa de la Cultura showing a man in a white T-shirt, tan shorts, and a black backpack running from the area.

On September 17, a suspect, identified as "Francisco Javier N." was arrested. According to the Morelos Prosecutor's Office, he will be charged with femicide.

== Reactions ==
Mexican president Claudia Sheinbaum responded to the killing, noting that "the Secretariat of Foreign Affairs is already in contact regarding this tragic homicide." The UAEM expressed "deep indignation" regarding the murder in a press release. Aguilera's sister spoke out against the murder in an Instagram video, saying: "I don't understand people or the society we live in. This happens every day, especially to women, and it's not fair. It is the most violent and cruelest way to die." On September 15, widespread student protests against femicide took place in Morelos. The University of Granada declared its "strongest revulsion and absolute condemnation," as well as its "deepest condolences and heartfelt sympathy to her family, friends, and fellow students." The UAEM student exchange program in which Aguilera was taking part was suspended by the University of Granada due to her murder.
