= Palacio de Lecumberri =

Former prison in the northeast of Mexico City

Coordinates: 19°26′11″N 99°06′47″W

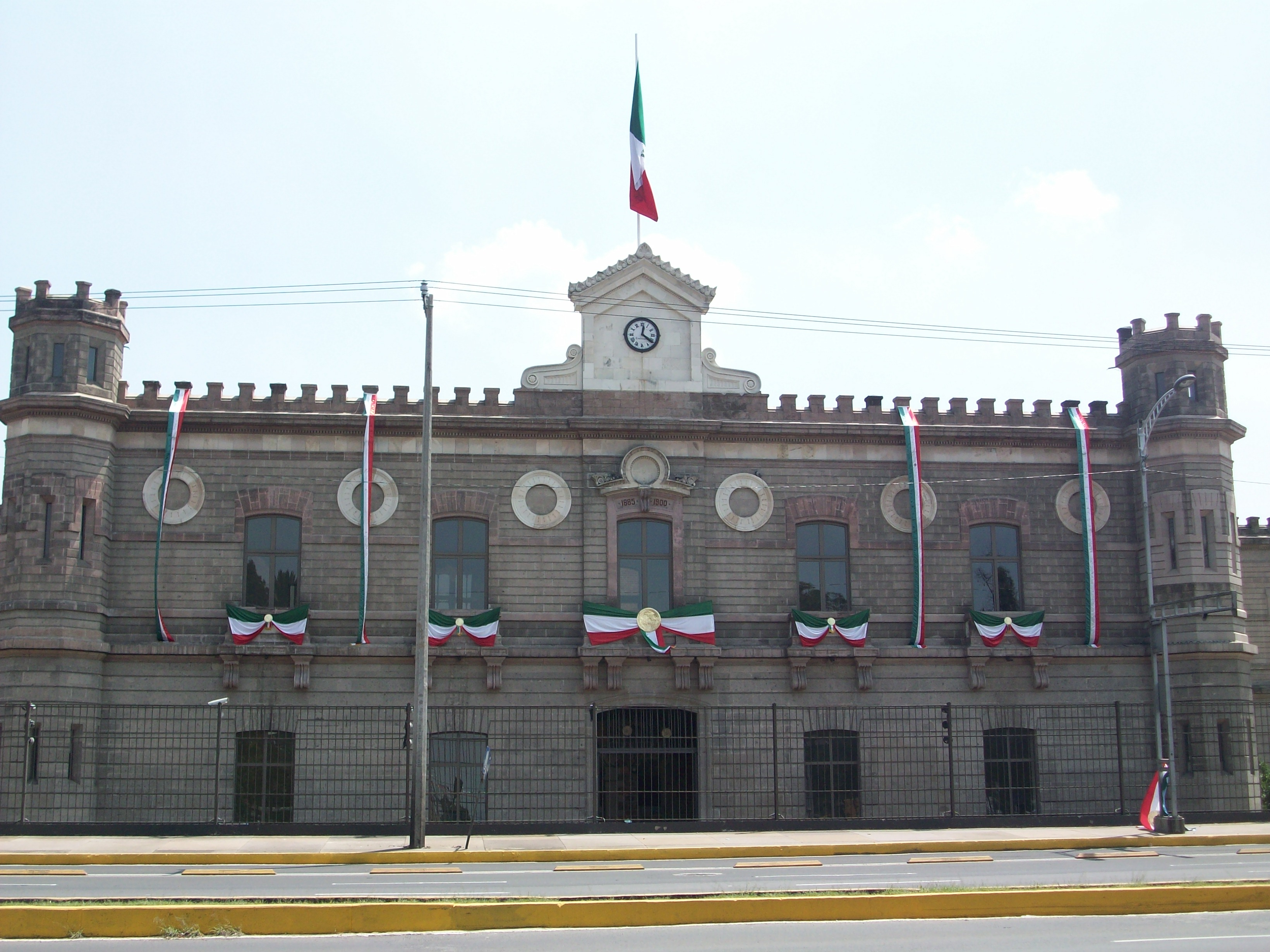
The Lecumberri building.

The Palacio de Lecumberri is a large building, formerly a prison, in the northeast of Mexico City, Mexico, which now houses the General National Archive (Archivo General de la Nación). Known in popular culture as The Black Palace of Lecumberri, it served as a penitentiary from 1900 to 1976. It was inaugurated by President Porfirio Díaz. The building was decommissioned as a prison in 1976 and turned over to the country's National Archive in 1980.

== Location, design and use ==
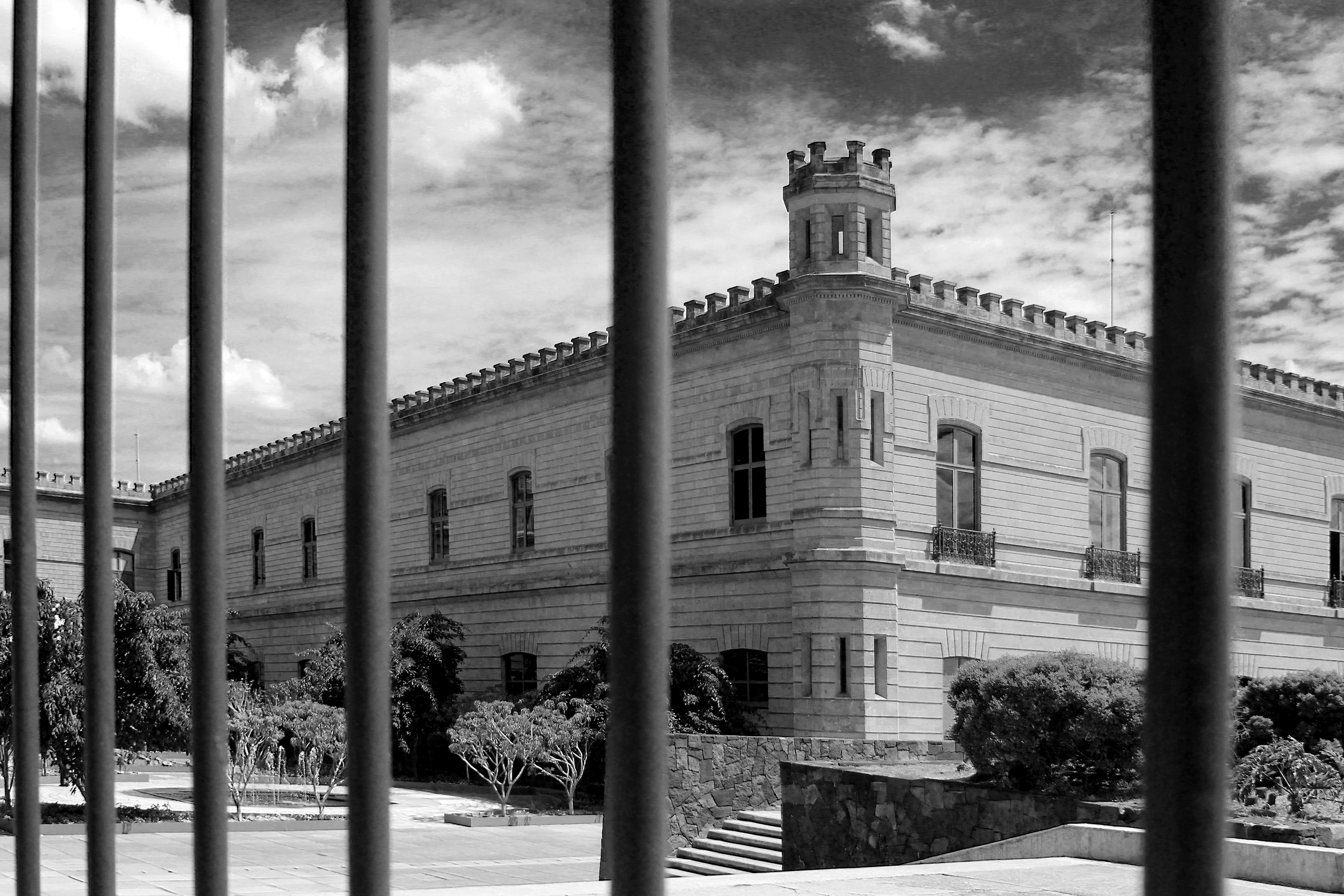
From behind bars.

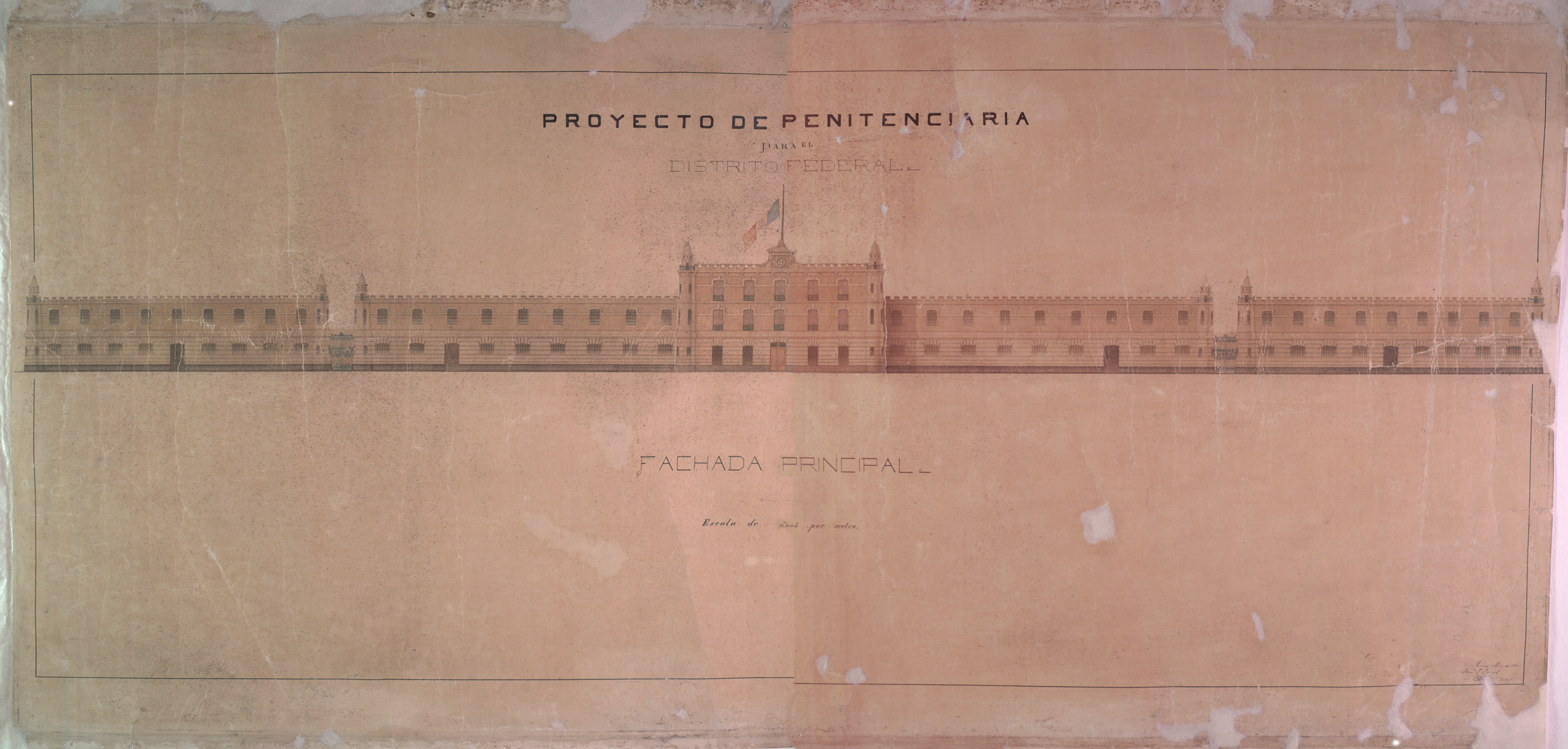
Blueprint of the Lecumberri Prison

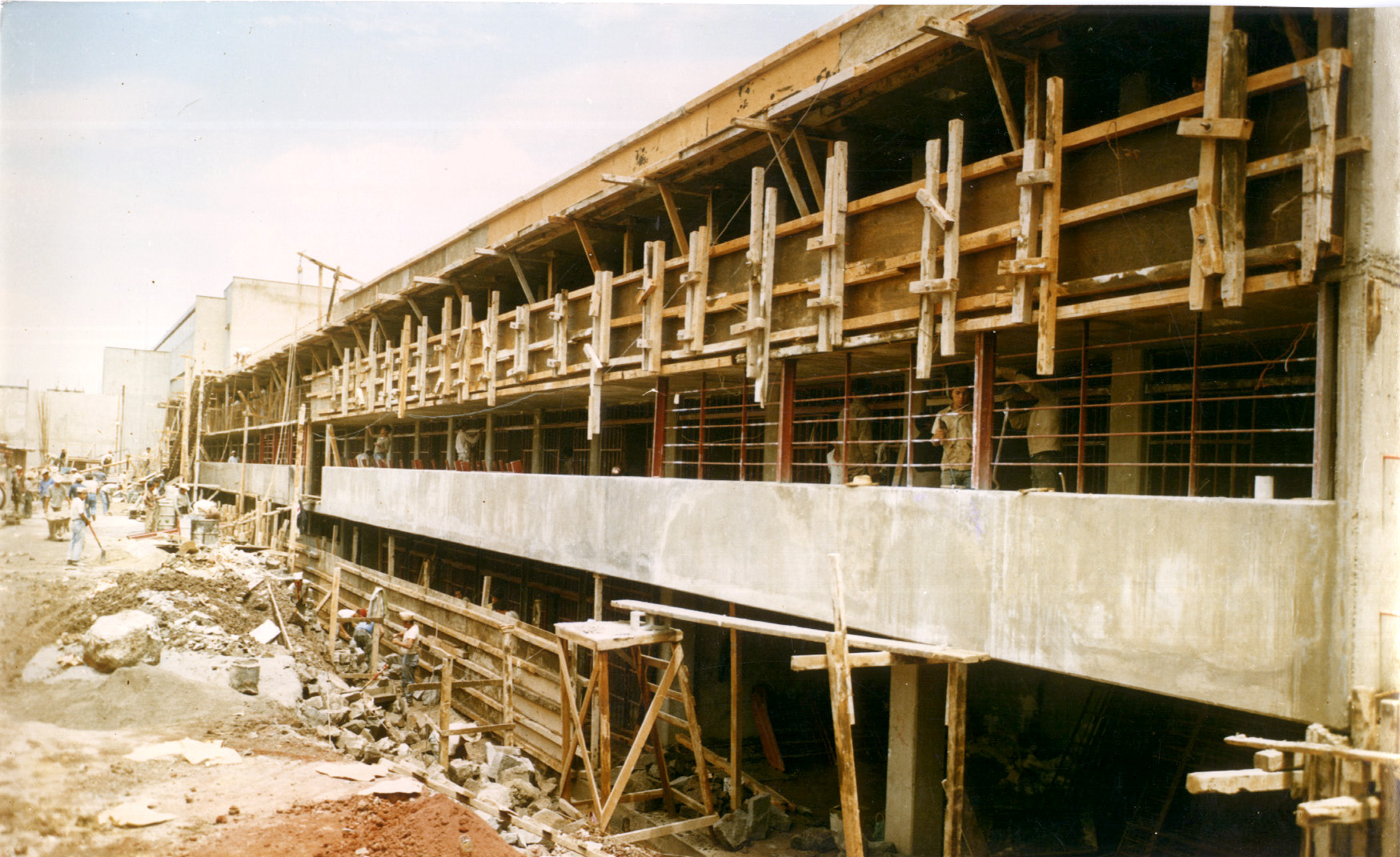
Construction of the Lecumberri prison

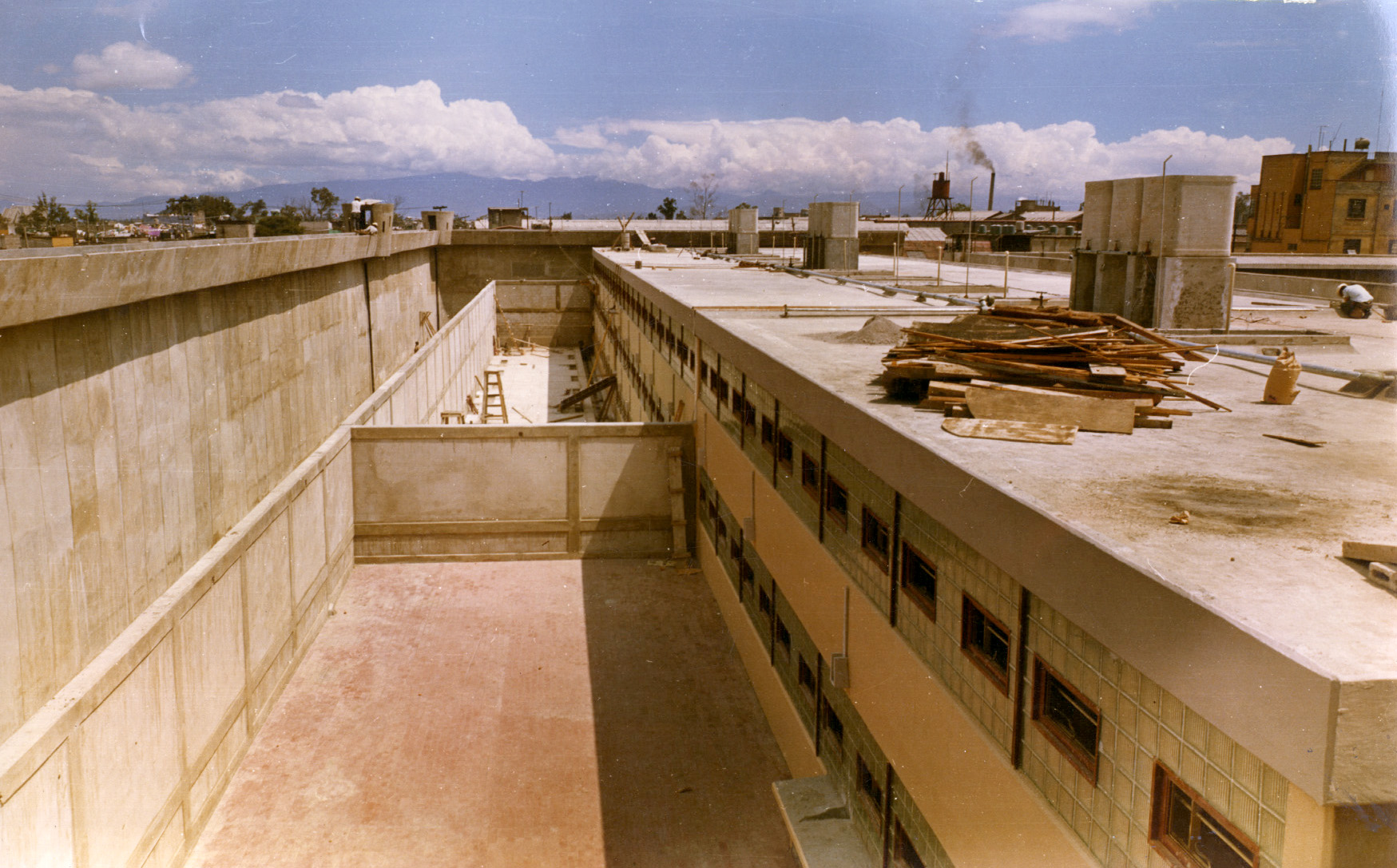
Final Completion to the Lecumberri Prison

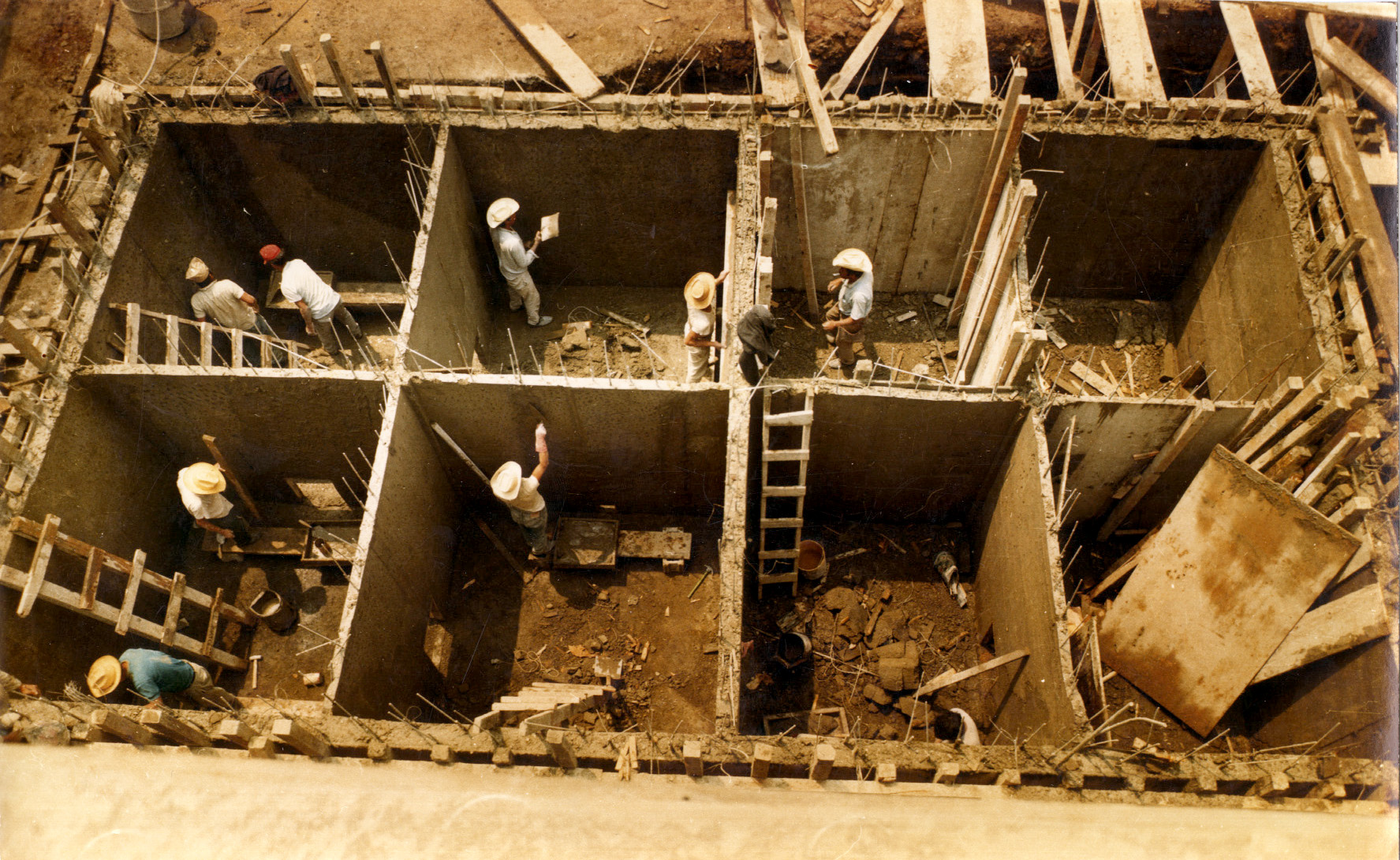
Construction of the Lecumberri Prison, view from the top

Palacio de Lecumberri is located at the North East border of Mexico City's Federal District. The building was used as a prison from 1900–1976, and as the Country's National Archive from 1980 onwards.

The prison was mainly constructed to contain major political advisers of the opposing side, or other criminals to the nation from the time of operation. Construction began in 1888.

The inspiration and design of the Palacio is by Miguel S. Macedo, who was later imprisoned there for several months during the Mexican Revolution. The design is said to have been based on that of Jeremy Bentham's Panopticon. This design allows for a single guard to observe all the prisoners without them being able to tell when the guard is looking; they therefore act as though they are always being watched.

The prison was built to hold 800 men, 180 women and 400 children. It had 804 cells, workshops, a nursery, cooking and baking workshops. There was also an area of government, a section dedicated to medical and waiting rooms.

== Living conditions ==
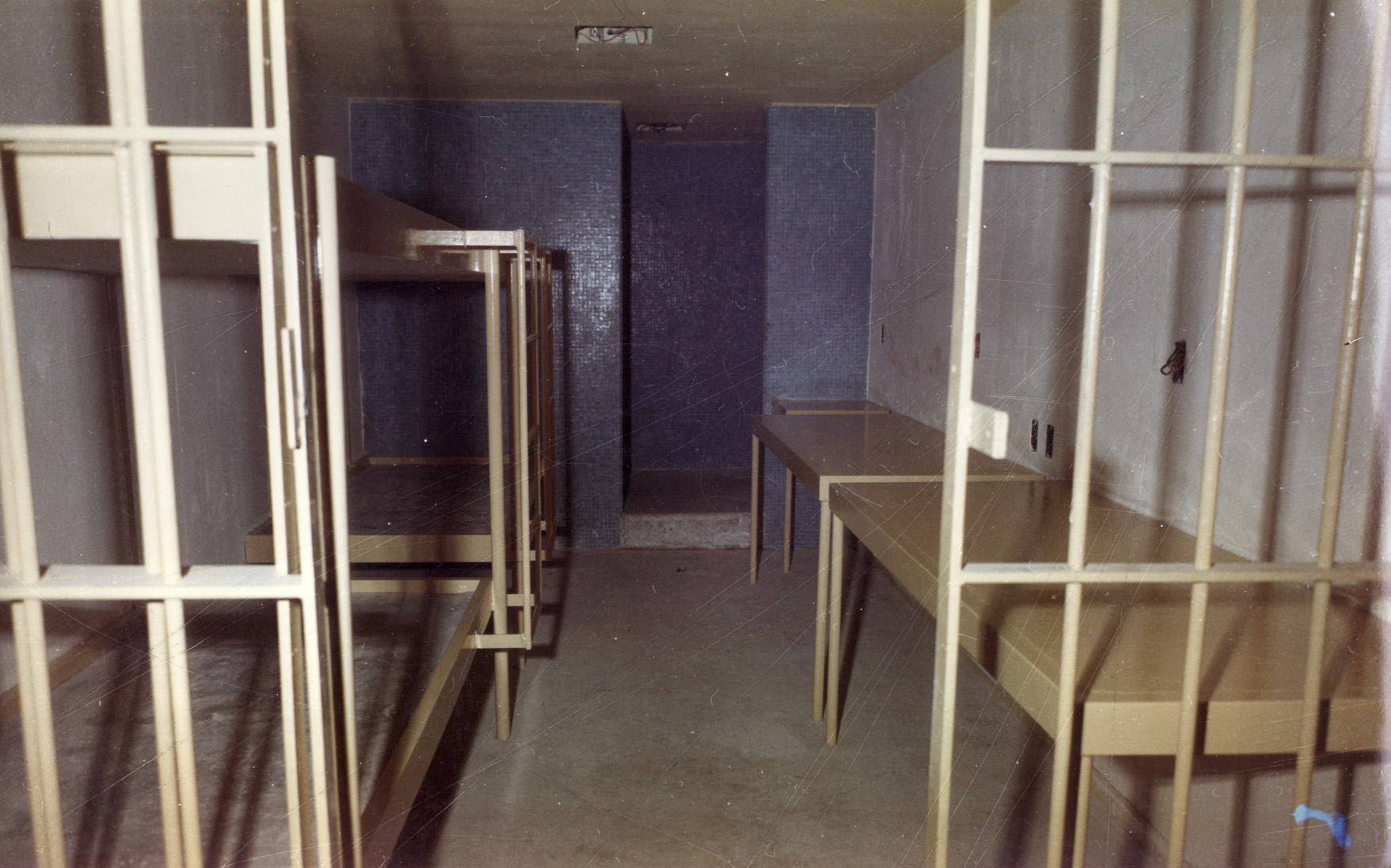
Photo of a Jail cell from the Lecumberri prison

The Diary of Lecumberri by Colombian Poet Álvaro Mutis, describes his time thereafter being imprisoned in 1958. The living conditions within the prison were very dangerous due to the inmates' treatment by the guards or staff. Torture and beatings were common. Corruption was also present within the prison system.

== Inmates ==
The majority of the early inmates were political threats to Porfirio Díaz and his administration. During the Mexico 68 student protests and the Dirty War of the 1970s it held left wing political prisoners.

There were a few notable people imprisoned there over the years including: David Alfaro Siqueiros, Juan Gabriel, Roberto "Anulfo" Villegas, Heberto Castillo, Trotsky's murderer Ramón Mercader, Gregorio Cárdenas Hernández and José Revueltas.

During La decena trágica in 1913, President Francisco I. Madero and Vice President José María Pino Suárez were murdered while en route to Lecumberri.

Throughout its 76-year use as a prison, only two people escaped alive. The first, Pancho Villa, was a general of the Mexican Revolution who made his escape in 1912. The second was Dwight Worker, an American convicted of smuggling cocaine. With the aid of his then-wife, Worker escaped on December 17, 1975, disguised as a woman. They later authored a book about their experiences entitled Escape (ISBN 0-913374-76-8).

== National Archives ==
The Archivo General de la Nación (General Archive of the Nation) is charged by the Mexican state to "be the governing body of the national archives and the central consultative entity of the Federal Executive." The writer Edmundo O'Gorman was its general director from 1938 until 1952. It is considered the most important among its class in the Americas and one of the most important in the entire world. In November 1976 the Prison was decommissioned on the order of President Luis Echeverría and turned over to the National Archive in 1980.

The archive houses millions of pages of the country's documentary heritage. Former prison cells are now used as record repositories and the corridors between them are used as galleries in which researchers can sit and read. In June 2002, 60,000 secret police files held within the archives were opened to the public by President Vicente Fox. The files document the government's actions during the Dirty War.

== See also ==
- Architecture of Mexico
- History of Mexico City
