= 2026 Salamanca shooting =

Mass shooting in Guanajuato, Mexico

2026 Salamanca football shooting
- Location: 20.683°N 101.263°W; Salamanca, Guanajuato, Mexico
- Date: 25 January 2026
- Attack type: Mass shooting
- Deaths: 11
- Injuries: 12

On 25 January 2026, a mass shooting occurred at a football field named Cabañas de la Comunidad in Salamanca, Guanajuato, Mexico.

== History ==
Multiple armed men, having arrived from vehicles, opened fire at the end of the football match, killing ten people, fatally wounding one other, and wounding twelve others. The shooting reportedly occurred at a few minutes before 6 PM local time. According to witnesses, more than a hundred gunshots were heard at the time of the shooting. The city's mayor César Prieto Gallardo said that the shooting was part of a larger crime wave and urged president Claudia Sheinbaum to intervene against the violence. The state prosecutor's office is currently investigating the incident. Sheinbaum explained that the security cabinet is coordinating with state authorities to investigate the case.
