= Milkman (rapper) =

Mexican rapper (1989–2026)

Óscar Botello (April 11, 1989 – February 12, 2026), better known as Milkman (stylized as MLKMN), was a Mexican rapper, producer and composer.

== Life and career ==
Botello was born at 5:48 am on April 11, 1989 by Caesarean section in Monterrey, Mexico and was raised in Laredo, Texas. In 2014, he released the single "El Bajo" through Universal Music. Throughout his career, he released EPs Fresco and Soy Milk.

He was also a creative director, working with J Balvin for the visuals for his albums Energía and Vibras.

Botello died on February 12, 2026, at the age of 36, after being hospitalized and requiring multiple surgeries.
