= Rossana Reguillo =

Mexican sociologist (1955–2026)

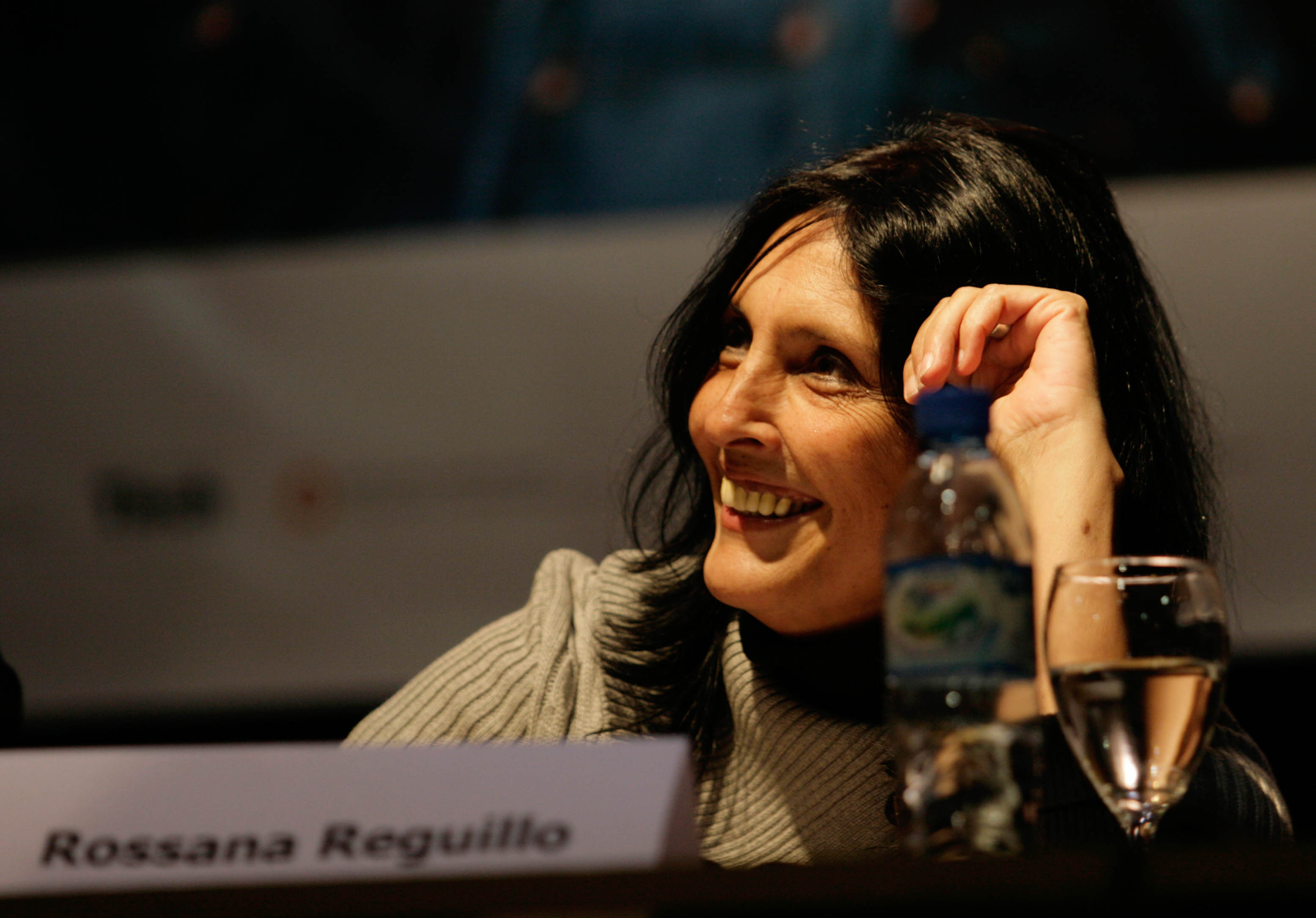
- Reguillo in 2007
- Born: 28 September 1955; Guadalajara, Jalisco, Mexico
- Died: 25 April 2026 (aged 70)
- Education: Western Institute of Technology and Higher Education (BA); Western Institute of Technology and Higher Education (MA); Centre of Research and Superior Studies in Social Anthropology (PhD)
- Scientific career
- Fields: Communication, Social Anthropology and Cultural Studies
- Workplaces: Western Institute of Technology and Higher Education; University of Guadalajara

Rossana Reguillo Cruz (Note: In this Mexican name, the surname is Reguillo and the second or maternal family name is Cruz.) (28 September 1955 – 25 April 2026) was a Mexican academic known for researching social norms, human emotions and the relationship between communication, culture, and politics in Latin America and how it is affected by drug trafficking. She held a professor position at ITESO University and the Western Institute of Technology and Higher Education. Additionally, she was a member of the Mexican Academy of Sciences and served as a visiting professor at New York University.

Reguillo was known to combine analysis with advocacy of social phenomena by advocating for social change. For instance, her studies on the 1992 drainage explosions in Guadalajara and the involvement of youth in the Mara Salvatrucha were conducted with a sense of activism and emotions rather than a purely rational and scientific outlook.

== Background ==
Rossana Reguillo was born in Guadalajara, Jalisco, on 28 September 1955. She was married to Jabez, a Mexican cartoonist.

Rossana Reguillo died on 25 April 2026, at the age of 70.

== Work ==
Reguillo held a doctorate in social sciences which has been her main field of study ever since.

She is known for her research on subjects such as communication, social anthropology, and cultural studies.

Reguillo held numerous visiting positions and chairs at different universities:

- Professor in the Studies of Social Communication Department at the University of Guadalajara, Guadalajara, Mexico (1995–2001).
- Visiting Professor at the University of Puerto Rico, Río Piedras Campus, Puerto Rico (1997, 2000).
- Tinker Visiting Professor at Stanford University, Center of Latin American Studies, California, United States (2001).
- UNESCO Chair in Communication at the Autonomous University of Barcelona, Barcelona, Spain (2004)
- UNESCO Chair in Communication at the Pontifical Xavierian University, Bogotá, Colombia (2004)

From 1981, Reguillo was a professor in the Sociocultural Studies Department at ITESO University and the Western Institute of Technology and Higher Education. She also served as the coordinator of its formal research program in sociocultural studies since 2001. Reguillo was a permanent member of the Mexican Academy of Sciences, and she held a level III rank in the National Researchers System of Mexico's National Council of Science and Technology.

Reguillo received recognition for her work, including the 1995 Best Research in Social Anthropology Fray Bernardino de Sahagun Award from the National Institute of Anthropology and History (INAH), the 1996 Ibero-American Award for Municipal and Regional Investigation from the Ibero-American Capital Cities Union in Spain, and the 2010 Advertising and Women Award for Communication Trajectory from the Municipal Institute of Women and the National Council to Prevent Discrimination (CONAPRED). She was also appointed an advisory member for Latin America for the Social Science Research Council in the US.

She taught courses and seminars at universities in Anglo and Latin America, as well as in Spain, including the University of Colima (Mexico), Autonomous University of Queretaro (Mexico), Pontifical Bolivarian University (Colombia), University of Puerto Rico (Puerto Rico), Central American University (El Salvador), University of Buenos Aires (Argentina), ORT University of Montevideo (Uruguay), National University of Colombia (Colombia) and Simón Bolívar Andean University (Bolivia).
