= Jonathan Meléndez =

Mexican keyboardist and composer

- Honas in a concert in 2024
- Born: Jonathan Samuel Meléndez Ochoa; 7 April 1988; Mexico State, Mexico
- Died: 1 September 2026 (aged 38); Atizapán de Zaragoza, Mexico State, Mexico
- Cause of death: Gunshot wound
- Occupations: keyboardist; composer
- Years active: 2013-2026

Jonathan Samuel Meléndez Ochoa (7 April 1988 — 1 September 2026), better known as Honas, was a Mexican keyboardist, composer and producer. In 2013, he founded the synthpop group Camilo Séptimo together with Coe and Erik, with whom he received two nominations for the IMAS Awards for New Artist and Song of the Year with "No Confíes En Mí" in 2015 and one for the MTV MIAW Awards for Video of the Year with "Inevitable" in 2022.

Together with Camilo Séptimo he released 4 studio albums: Óleos in 2017, Navegantes in 2019, Ecos in 2022 and Jardín de las almas in 2023, in addition to an EP titled Maya in 2014. Among his best-known songs are "Miénteme", "No Te Puedo Olvidar", "Vicio", "Inevitable", "Contacto", "No Confíes en Mí", "Contracorriente", "Galáctica" and "Como Tú". He also sang in the choirs for live performances.

== Biography ==
Jonathan was born in Mexico City and, from a young age, showed an interest in music, studying piano and other instruments throughout his childhood and adolescence. Before joining Camilo Séptimo in 2013, Honas collaborated with various local groups, where he gained experience in performance and composition. His musical training allowed him to explore different genres. He contributed to the band's sound, incorporating synthesizers and effects into his compositions. He participated in the development of songs such as "Miénteme," "No te puedo olvidar," and "Vicio," among others, across the four albums. In addition to his work with the band, Jonathan also explored solo projects and collaborations with other artists. Throughout his career, he was part of the Mexican music scene and contributed to the evolution of Camilo Séptimo in Latin rock.

== Artistic career ==
=== 2013-2026: With Camilo Séptimo ===
Jonathan Meléndez, Manuel Mendoza, and Erik Vázquez were musicians who, after participating in several individual projects, joined in 2013 to form Camilo Séptimo. The band developed a cohesive sound, a result of its members' experience. Their first single was titled "Portales," a song that combined rock and nostalgic pop. The track featured reverberating guitars and atmospheric synthesizers, along with dynamic drum rhythm and bass lines. "No confíes en mí" was the single that launched them to fame.

== Murder ==
On 2 September 2026, his murder was reported at his home located in the Grand Viure subdivision, in Zona Esmeralda, Atizapán de Zaragoza, in the State of Mexico. During the events, the artist's wife, Ana Paula Barragán (who was 4 months pregnant), their youngest daughter (3 years old), Aleyda Romero (21 years old), who helped in caring for the children, and the family pet, also died. The only survivor was his eldest son (6 years old), authorities found him alive in the apartment unharmed.

=== Chronology ===
In a video released by the condominium's security cameras, around 5:24 p.m. (UTC-06:00), Diego Sebastián "N" had arrived at the artist's home. During this time, a friend of Meléndez, Fredy Núñez received a call from Jonathan, informing him that Sebastián "N" was inside his apartment (located on the 9th floor of Tower 4) and that if he did not come out in 30 minutes, he should notify the police. After the time had passed, Núñez went to the apartment where Meléndez was; Meléndez opened the door for him and indicated that everything was fine but did not let him inside. As a result, Núñez went to the residential complex's security, reporting that there was an armed man; the private security guards told him they could not do anything, which led to the presence of the Atizapán police. After knocking on the apartment door, Jonathan, without opening it, told them everything was fine and he could not attend to them. Although the events occurred between 5:30 p.m. and 7:40 p.m. (UTC-06:00) on Tuesday, September 1, the Atizapán police made their report almost 4 hours later, around 11:50 p.m., when the authorities, now accompanied by personnel from the Secretariat of the Navy returned to the apartment and entered using a battering ram.

Subsequently, journalist Carlos Jiménez, known as Carlos Jiménez, reported that the crime would have been perpetrated by Diego Sebastián Rosen (Meléndez's alleged partner) and another individual identified as Gerardo "N", who would later be identified as Gerardo Cisneros Bejarano. Both had gone to the artist's penthouse because, according to Rosen, Meléndez was supposed to lend him 300,000.00 MXN (other sources mention the objective was to seize a device containing around 30,000,000.00 MXN in Bitcoins), but he had not provided it, which led to a fight that ended in the homicides. On 2 September, during a press conference, the Secretary of Security and Citizen Protection, Omar García Harfuch, stated that just 12 hours after the incident, these two individuals had been detained and that during the incident, there was a minor (aged 5 to 6) who survived and was unharmed.

== Discography ==
=== With Camilo Séptimo ===
Studio albums

- 2017: Óleos
- 2019: Navegantes
- 2022: Ecos
- 2023: Jardín de las almas

EPs

- 2014: Maya

== Awards and nominations ==
With Camilo Séptimo

Year	Ceremony	Category	Nomination	Result	Ref
2015	IMAs Awards	New Artist	Camilo Séptimo	Nominated	
2015	IMAs Awards	Song of the Year	"No confíes en mí"	Nominated	
2022	MTV MIAW Awards	Video of the Year	"Inevitable"	Nominated	
