= Killing of Carolina Flores Gómez =

Killing of former Mexican beauty queen (April 2026)

- Location: Polanco, Mexico City, Mexico
- Date: April 15, 2026
- Attack type: Femicide
- Victim: Carolina Flores Gómez
- Perpetrator: Erika María "N"
- Motive: Family disputes and the attacker's lack of acceptance of her daughter-in-law.

On April 15, 2026, Carolina Flores Gómez, a former Mexican beauty queen from Baja California, was murdered by her mother-in-law, identified as Erika María, in the Polanco neighborhood of Mexico City. The case was considered a femicide, because there were previous family disputes between the two. Flores Gómez was 27 years old at the time of her death.

The murder shocked the entire country and opened a debate about toxic family dynamics and the interference that parents make in the lives of their children and their children's partners. Carolina's family and feminist groups denounced the displays of jealousy that Erika felt towards her, which led to her murder.

== Background ==
Carolina Flores Gómez was born on April 4, 1999, in Ensenada, Baja California, Mexico. At 17, she was crowned Miss Teen Universe Baja California 2017. This title led her to represent her home state in national pageants, where she stood out for her charisma on the runway. She also worked as a content creator, whose main focus was on fashion and lifestyle. Regarding her private life, she was in a relationship with a young man named Alejandro Sánchez Herrera. The couple, who had moved from Baja California to Mexico City in December 2025 in search of a new life, had an eight-month-old baby.

Erika María Guadalupe Herrera, 63, is a woman who had a career in local politics, as she was a candidate for councilwoman (Note: In Mexico, this political position is known as regidor(a).) in the municipality of Ensenada in 2016, as a representative of the Party of the Democratic Revolution (PRD). Although she did not manage to consolidate a high-profile career at the national level, she was a well-known figure in certain political and social circles in Baja California. Regarding her private life, it is only known that she is the mother of Alejandro and the grandmother of the baby he had with Carolina.

== Murder and investigation ==
Flores Gómez was shot to death on April 15, 2026, at the age of 27, in the Polanco apartment where she lived with her husband Alejandro and her eight-month-old baby, while having a heated argument with her mother-in-law, Erika María. Days before the crime, Erika María had traveled from Ensenada to Mexico City to visit the family, with whom she had personal conflicts, leading to the conclusion that the attack was premeditated. The apartment's baby monitor captured images showing the two women arguing, during which Erika ends up shooting Carolina six times as she walked toward the bedroom, in the presence of Alejandro and the baby. In the recordings, Alejandro can be heard reprimanding his mother about the attack, asking, "What did you do, Mom?" and "What's wrong with you? She's my family!" to which Erika responds, "Nothing, she just made me angry. You are mine, and she stole you from me."

The following day, April 16, Alejandro filed a complaint with the Attorney General's Office of Mexico City. The fact that Alejandro waited 24 hours to report his mother drew criticism for his alleged inaction and complicity in the case. However, the man stated that the reason he delayed was his fear of Erika and his desire to protect the baby's life, according to statements from Carolina's mother, Reyna Gómez Molina, who had received a phone call from her son-in-law informing her about the femicide. Likewise, Gómez sent a warning message to Erika, who was already a fugitive from justice and received an arrest warrant, saying that the most appropriate thing to do was to "turn herself in to the authorities."

For his part, Alejandro stated that, in the time between his wife's murder and when he filed the complaint against his mother with the FGJCDMX, he was feeding the baby. After the attack, he left the apartment with the baby in his arms to confront Erika, unsuccessfully preventing her escape. It was thought that the woman had fled immediately after shooting the victim, but it was later learned that she called a taxi and waited a few minutes before taking her suitcases and leaving the apartment.

On April 29, after days without knowing her whereabouts, Erika was located and arrested in Venezuela thanks to an Interpol red notice. She initially fled to Central America before arriving in Caracas for refuge; the FGJCDMX later revealed that she was in custody, while the necessary arrangements are made to formalize her extradition to Mexico. A formal international arrest warrant was issued for her on April 27.

== Reactions ==
The governor of Baja California, Marina del Pilar Ávila Olmeda, lamented Carolina's murder and expressed support for her family. She assured that her state prosecutor's office would collaborate with the investigations being carried out by Mexico City authorities regarding the case. The FGJCDMX confirmed an immigration alert to capture Erika María throughout Mexico, as it was not ruled out that she could return to Ensenada. Furthermore, inconsistencies were detected in the testimony that Alejandro gave in his complaint and has not ruled out that he may be investigated. Protests were organized to demand justice, where family members and activist groups have taken to the streets to demand that the crime not go unpunished. The hashtag #JusticiaParaCarolina went viral on social media, promoted by groups seeking to highlight that violence against women occurs even within the closest family circles.
