= Latinus (news portal) =

Mexican news portal based in Delaware

- Company type: News portal
- Available in: Spanish
- Founded: 2019
- Headquarters: Dover, Delaware, {{{location_country}}}
- Country of origin: Mexico; United States

Latinus (also stylized as LatinUS) is a Mexican news portal based in Dover, Delaware, United States. It was founded in 2019, and covers politics, sports, economy, lifestyle and international affairs.

Hosts include Carlos Loret de Mola, Víctor Trujillo and Claudio Ochoa. The portal has published multiple investigations of alleged government corruption which led to conflicts with the Mexican government and related figures, who have accused Latinus of involvement in money laundering and defamation.

== History ==
LatinUs Media Group LCC was registered in Dover, Delawere, in December 2019. News anchor Carlos Loret de Mola announced the next month the establishment of LatinUS, a news portal aimed to the Spanish-speaking community in the United States. It began on 2 February 2020. Carlos Loret de Mola had previously worked for Televisa as one of its main news anchors, and was critical of the administration of Andrés Manuel López Obrador, President of Mexico (2018–2024), including criticisms to Manuel Bartlett, the director of the Comisión Federal de Electricidad during his term.

Carlos Loret de Mola hosted 102 episodes of his program, which aired on Thursdays, before it ended in January 2023 and was replaced by a daily news program. During its broadcast, he presented various reports covering topics related to Andrés Manuel López Obrador, his family, and his cabinet. Other program hosts include Claudio Ochoa and Víctor Trujillo, who appears as his character Brozo, a clown.

=== Notable reports ===
==== Videos of Andrés Manuel López Obrador brothers ====
On 20 August 2020, Carlos Loret de Mola published two videos showing Pío López Obrador, brother of Andrés Manuel López Obrador, receiving envelopes containing alleged money from David León Romero in different places. The videos show David León Romero supposedly giving $400,000 to Pío and mentions that he has the support of Manuel Velasco Coello, who was Governor of Chiapas at the time. The next morning, Andrés Manuel López Obrador said, "These are contributions to strengthen the movement at a time when the people were the ones supporting it. When these resources were contributed, they were for sound and assemblies. Yes, there were people who contributed funds, even very humble people; when we had the account, they contributed money month by month."

The next year, on 8 July 2021, a video showing David León Romero was published, but now giving money to Martín López Obrador, another brother of Andrés Manuel López Obrador. David León said that the money was a personal loan from his own funds.

In 2022, the Office of the Attorney General of Mexico determined that there was no evidence of any illegal act in the videos. In 2025, the National Electoral Institute rejected sanctions against Pío López Obrador and David León Romero, as it was unable to find banking evidence that the money had been used by a political party. Following this, Pío López Obrador announced a lawsuit against Latinus and Carlos Loret de Mola, seeking $200 million each for defamation.

==== The house of José Ramón López Beltrán ====
In January 2022, Carlos Loret de Mola, along with Mexicanos contra la Corrupción, published an investigation claiming that José Ramón López Beltrán, son of Andrés Manuel López Obrador, allegedly had a conflict of interest due to his father's position and was living in a high-end house in Houston, Texas, owned by a former employee of Baker Hughes, a company with business ties to Pemex, the Mexican state-owned petroleum company, and his wife was supposedly linked to the employee. Andrés Manuel López Obrador said, "Apparently, the lady has money, but she has nothing to do with the government." José Ramón López Beltrán denied a conflict of interest and said he was working as a lawyer in Houston. The Mexican Senate rejected investigating the case through the Attorney General of Mexico because the investigation was not conclusive regarding an illegal act or a conflict of interest.

==== El Clan ====
Carlos Loret de Mola, together with Mexicanos contra la Corrupción, published an investigation dubbing a network composed of the sons of Andrés Manuel López Obrador, Gonzalo and Andrés Manuel López Beltrán, their cousins and their friends as "El Clan", who supposedly from and exerted influence over projects related to the Instituto de Salud para el Bienestar and the Tren Maya.

The investigation claimed that a company owned by a friend of Gonzalo López Beltrán, son of Andrés Manuel López Obrador, became the main supplier of ballast for the Tren Maya after Gonzalo López Beltrán was named an honorary advisor. In the published audios, the businessman allegedly admits that his income increased significantly and that the business involved transporting the stones. One of the cousins says that, "Once it derails, it's going to be another mess," when speaking with the businessman.

The Instituto de Salud para el Bienestar provided $490,000,000 to the same businessman, whose company Romedic, was listed by the Federal Commission for the Protection against Sanitary Risk as one of the drug distributors that do not comply with health regulations.

Gonzalo and Andrés Manuel López Beltrán rejected the investigation, adding: "None of the slanders and accusations against us have been supported by evidence," "We are not involved in public administration at any level of government, and much less do we have any influence over the decisions that these governments make," and that the investigation sought to "apply the maxims of criminal journalism, according to which 'slander, when it does not stain, smudges.'"

== Financing ==
Sin Embargo.mx published in March 2021 that the owners of Latinus were businesspeople and former politicians, including the son and son-in-law of Roberto Madrazo Pintado, Governor of Tabasco (1995–1999) and a political rival of Andrés Manuel López Obrador. The investigation indicated that they received contracts from the government of Michoacán to finance Latinus, but these were not declared to the tax authorities. Journalist Julio Astillero said that Delaware was chosen because the state allows minimal transparency and regulation for companies. The Financial Investigation Unit has investigated Latinus for alleged money laundering.
