= Andrés Mendoza (serial killer) =

Mexican serial killer (1947–2026)

- Born: Andrés Filomeno Mendoza Celis; 29 November 1947; Zimatlán de Álvarez, Oaxaca, Mexico
- Died: 29 October 2026 (aged 78); Tenango del Valle, State of Mexico, Mexico
- Conviction: Murder ×8
- Penalty: Life imprisonment

Details
- Victims: 19–30+
- Span of crimes: 1994–2021
- Country: Mexico
- State: State of Mexico
- Date apprehended: 15 May 2021

Andrés Filomeno Mendoza Celis (29 November 1947 – 29 October 2026) was a Mexican serial killer and butcher who was linked to at least 19 murders. (Note: It is also believed that his real number of victims could be 30 or more.)

Mendoza was initially convicted of murdering Reyna González Amador. In June 2021, 3,787 bones were found inside his home. In June 2022, it was reported that the number of skeletal remains found in his house increased to 4,600, which were presumed to belong to 19 people; 17 women, a child, and a man.

== Biography ==
In 2015, Mendoza worked as president of the citizen participation council of his neighborhood during the administration of the politician and, at that time, municipal president, Ana María Balderas Trejo. He also worked for several years as a butcher, working in a slaughterhouse preparing meat for human consumption in Tlalnepantla. This was one of the reasons why he had knowledge on how to dissect and cut the bodies of his victims.

=== Psychology ===
It has been mentioned that Mendoza was inspired by the 1991 film The Silence of the Lambs, the same year in which it is reported that he committed his first murder against a woman. This was reported by Javier Tejado Dondé, a columnist for the Mexican newspaper El Universal who was involved in a documentary series on Mendoza's crimes. However, psychologist Feggy Ostrosky Shejet rejected Tejado Dondé's version. She affirmed this because she herself interviewed Mendoza and questioned him about his supposed inspiration by Hannibal Lecter, to which he responded by saying that he only watched Mexican movies.

== Arrest and investigation ==
On 15 May 2021, Mendoza was arrested in Atizapán de Zaragoza, State of Mexico, when he was found with the dismembered corpse of a woman initially identified as Reyna and her real name was Reyna González Amador. She had been reported missing the previous day. It was presumed that Amador was his lover, but this was denied, since she was married and it was her husband, Bruno Ángel Portillo, who found her body after forcibly entering the home of Mendoza located on Margaritas Street in the Lomas de San Miguel neighborhood. In addition, INE credentials, clothing, shoes, makeup, and bags of several women were found inside, as well as cassette recordings of him committing the murders, and a notebook with a list of several names of women, these being his possible victims. He also kept skinned faces and hair. He buried or ate the women he murdered, having perpetrated these crimes for years.

Mendoza was taken to the Barrientos prison in Tlalnepantla de Baz. According to some statements from his neighbors, the man could not bear the contempt and disinterest he received from young women, while others described him as "quiet, and he did not bother women". He was linked to the murders while imprisoned.

== Trial and sentences ==
According to the ministerial statement, Mendoza confessed that with the exception of Reyna, he met all his victims in bars located in Tlalnepantla, places where they worked and where he visited. He would then invite them to his house with the intention of having sexual relations. In almost all cases, they consumed alcoholic beverages and then Mendoza murdered them by stabbing them.

In March 2022, Mendoza was convicted of the femicide of Reyna and sentenced to life imprisonment. On 17 October, he was sentenced to 55 years in prison for the femicide of another victim.

On 18 January 2023, Mendoza was sentenced to 92 years in prison, also for femicide, in addition to murder and crimes related to the disappearance of a woman and child. Between 29 March, 10 July, 23 August and 6 December 2023, he was sentenced to an additional 55 years in prison for the femicide and disappearances of four more women.

On 8 February 2024, Mendoza was given an additional eighth sentence, as well as a fine of 105,961 and 1,864,036 pesos as compensation to the victims of his crimes for material damage, after being charged with the murder of another woman whose initials were the only information provided, BSO.

== Death ==
Mendoza died in Tenango del Valle Prison on 29 October 2026, at the age of 78.

== In media ==
On 27 June 2022, the documentary series, Caníbal: Indignación Total, premiered on Las Estrellas and was produced by the Supreme Court of Mexico. It documents all the information gathered on the case of Mendoza, from his arrest to the discovery of the skeletal remains at his home, as well as interviews with Mendoza's neighbors authorities and other people involved in the case.
