= National Electoral Institute =

Federal electoral agency of Mexico

- Abbreviation: INE
- Formation: 1990 (as Instituto Federal Electoral); 2014 (as Instituto Nacional Electoral)
- Type: Independent agency
- Legal status: Active
- Headquarters: Av. Viaducto Tlalpan 100, Tlalpan, Mexico City
- Official language: Spanish
- President: Blanca Cruz García (interim)
- Website: www.ine.mx/
- Formerly called: Federal Electoral Institute (Instituto Federal Electoral, IFE, 1990–2014)

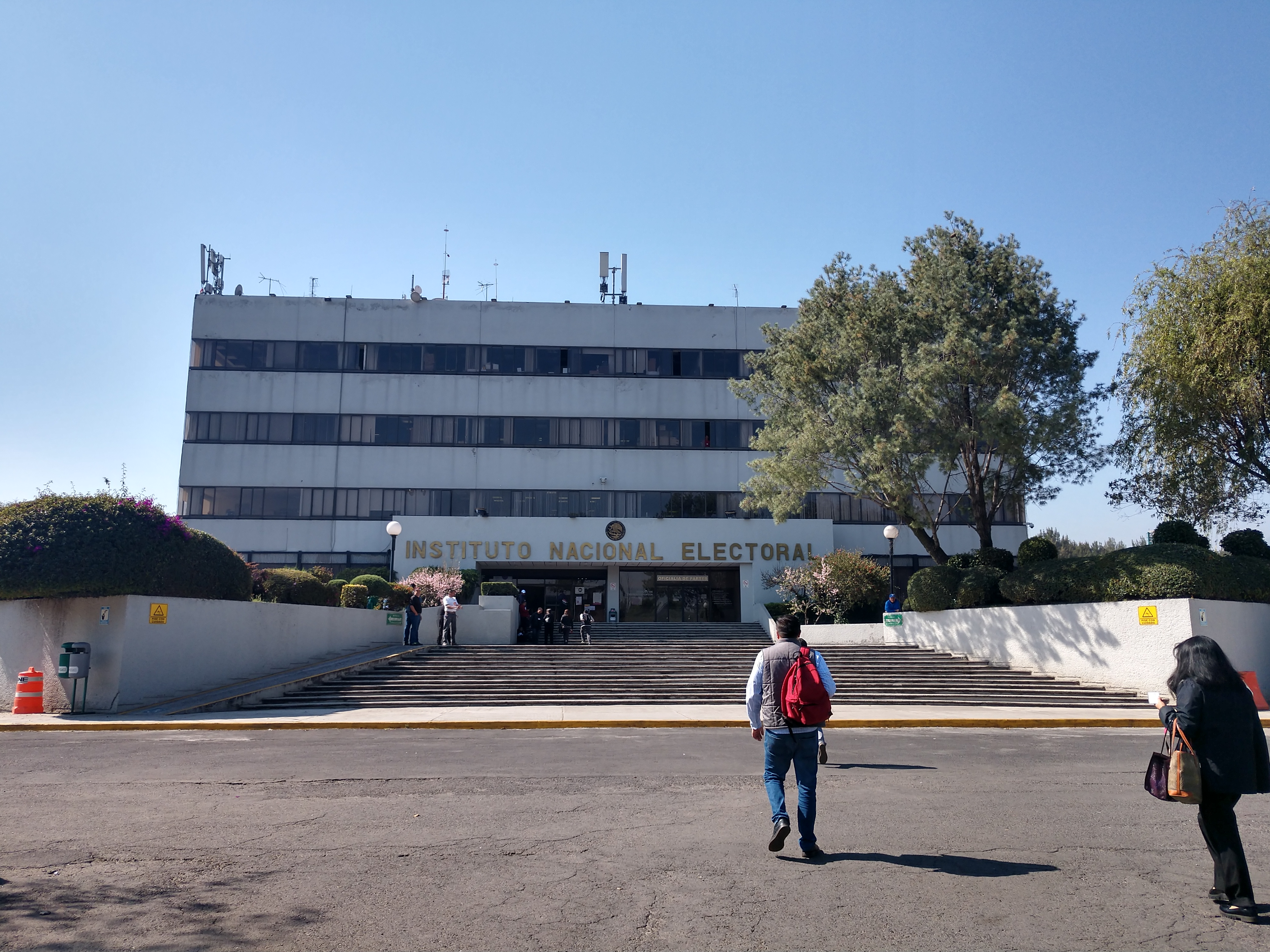
INE headquarters in Mexico City

The National Electoral Institute (Spanish: Instituto Nacional Electoral; INE), formerly the Federal Electoral Institute (Spanish: Instituto Federal Electoral; IFE), is an autonomous, public agency responsible for organizing federal elections in Mexico: that is, those related to the election of the President of the United Mexican States, the members of the Congress of the Union as well as elections of authorities and representatives at local and state levels.

Blanca Cruz García is the interim president following the resignation of Guadalupe Taddei, who was appointed as the agency's president in 2023 for a nine-year term but resigned in October 2026 amid corruption allegations.

== History ==
=== Background ===
In 1917, with the promulgation of the Constitution of Mexico, the Junta Empadronadora, the local Computing Councils and the Electoral Colleges were placed in charge of organizing and supervising the election of the president, the Chamber of Deputies, and the Senate. This meant municipal presidents were granted a great deal of control over the election process, due to the location and amount of polling station within their municipalities.

=== Federal Electoral Viligance Commission (1946–1973) ===
The Federal Electoral Viligance Commission (Comisión Federal de Vigilancia Electoral, CFVE), Mexico's first formal electoral body, was established with the Federal Electoral Law on January 7, 1946, as a dependent agency of the Secretariat of the Interior (SEGOB). The CFVE was led by the Secretary of the Interior, an additional cabinet member, a federal deputy, a senator, and two representatives from the largest political parties. President Manuel Ávila Camacho, the artificer of the new agency, transferred the responsibility of electoral vigilance to the office of the president, arguing that municipalities were unable to perform that function due to "party influence".

The new Electoral Law also established the Council of the Electoral Roll and Local Electoral Commissions, as well as declaring independent candidacies illegal, granting political parties exclusivity during electoral processes.

In 1951, the attributions of the CFVE as an electoral authority were expanded. Some of its new responsibilities included emitting majority certificates to recognize winning candidates and intervention in the process to create new political parties.

=== Federal Electoral Commission (1973–1990) ===
In 1973, the CFVE was abolished and replaced by the Federal Electoral Commission (Comisión Federal Electoral). Its governing organ introduced representatives from all legally registered political parties, who had voice and vote for the proceedings.

In the 1976 Mexican general election, José López Portillo participated as the sole candidate for the presidency. Once he was president, he enacted the 1977 political reforms, which created the Law for Political Organizations and Electoral Proceedings (LOPPE). This law modified the government organ of the Electoral Commission, to include representatives from all parties, including those under a "conditional registry". The figure of conditional registry consisted of a four-year probation period for new political parties, during which they needed to demonstrate their subsistence. This figure was eliminated in 1984. Since the reform made it easier to register new political parties and granted effective representation in the Electoral Commission to existing parties, it was generally considered a progressive reform.

At the end of the 1980s, opposition parties consolidated themselves as a serious threat to the hegemony of the Institutional Revolutionary Party (PRI). This led to the 1987 electoral reform, which established a proportional representation system in the Electoral Commission's government body, giving PRI a majority of the political party representatives. Because of this, the reform was generally considered regressive.

=== 1990–2014 ===
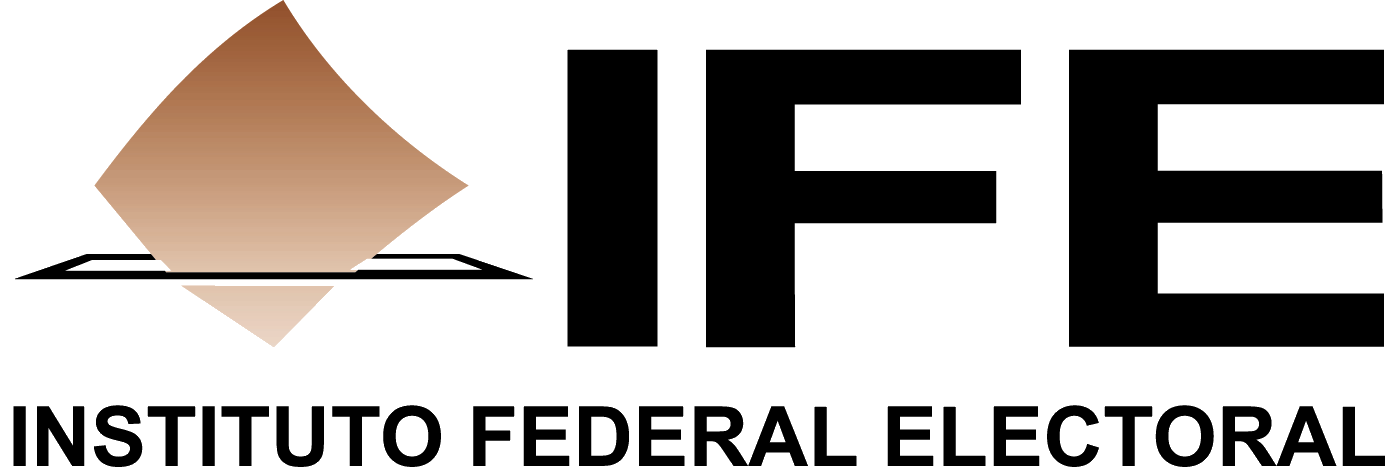
IFE former logo, used from October 11, 1990, to April 4, 2014

The IFE was formally established on October 11, 1990, after controversies surrounding the 1988 general election resulted in a series of constitutional reforms approved in 1989 and the Federal Code of Electoral Institutions and Procedures (Cofipe), a law passed in August 1990 and currently in force. The legislative branch of the federal government, the national political parties, and the general citizenry participated in its composition.

Since its creation, the constitutional and legal regulations in this subject matter have experienced further major reforms, which have affected the composition and details of the IFE. A reform approved in 1996 reinforced the level of independence and autonomy of the IFE by completely dissociating the executive branch from any aspect regarding its membership or functions, and by reserving the vote within all its directive bodies to the councilors, the members that do not have links to any party or to any state power or body.

IFE had legal personnel and assets of its own. Its headquarters were located in the Federal District, and it was organized under a decentralized framework that allowed it to exercise its duties throughout the country.

As a result of electoral reforms initiated by President Enrique Peña Nieto, the IFE was dissolved on April 4, 2014, and was replaced by the National Electoral Institute (Spanish: Instituto Nacional Electoral, INE).

=== 2014–present ===
The logo used from 2014 to 2026

With its creation in 2014, the National Electoral Institute took over all responsibilities of the Federal Electoral Institute. It was also charged with oversight of all elections at local and state level, as well as plebiscites and the regulation of processes of citizens' participation in public administration. Lorenzo Córdova Vianello was appointed chairman of the General Council for a nine-year period starting 2014.

In 2022, President Andrés Manuel López Obrador proposed a reform that would require INE officials to be elected by popular vote. He contended that the proposal would "allow citizens to select honest people to run elections". The idea was opposed by academics and nongovernmental organizations, viewing it a way to politicize the body with parties steering their supporters to vote for particular candidates for the board. In June 2023, the Supreme Court of Justice of the Nation blocked the proposed changes.

Guadalupe Taddei was appointed the agency's president in March 2023 for a nine-year term but resigned in October 2026 amid allegations of corruption in the adjudication of some of the INE's contracts. The matter is currently under investigation by the Superior Auditor of the Federation (ASF).

== Membership of the General Council ==
The General Council (Consejo General) is the INE's highest governing body. Its eleven voting members, a councillor president and ten electoral councillors, serve staggered nine-year terms and are elected by a two-thirds vote of the Chamber of Deputies, or by lot if that majority is not reached. The presidency has been vacant since Guadalupe Taddei resigned in October 2026, and Blanca Yassahara Cruz García presides on an interim basis.

Councillor / birthdate and place	Chamber of Deputies vote	Age at		Start date	Length of service
Councillor / birthdate and place	Chamber of Deputies vote	Start	Present	Start date	Length of service
(Interim president) (Note: The presidency has been vacant since the resignation of Guadalupe Taddei in October 2026. The electoral councillors chose one of their members to preside over the council provisionally until the Chamber of Deputies appoints a new president. Cruz García was chosen on 27 October 2026.); Blanca Yassahara Cruz García; 6 September 1986 (age 40); Huajuapan de León, Oaxaca	334–127	39	40	22 April 2026	203 days
Norma Irene de la Cruz Magaña	399–5	—	—	27 July 2020	6 years, 107 days
Uuc-kib Espadas Ancona; 27 November 1963 (age 62); Mérida, Yucatán	399–5	56	62	27 July 2020	6 years, 107 days
José Martín Fernando Faz Mora; 5 October 1962 (age 64); San Luis Potosí, San Luis Potosí	399–5	57	64	27 July 2020	6 years, 107 days
Carla Astrid Humphrey Jordan	399–5	—	—	27 July 2020	6 years, 107 days
Arturo Castillo Loza	Lottery (Note: The parliamentary groups failed to agree on candidates, so on 31 March 2023, these councillors were drawn by lot.)	—	—	4 April 2023	3 years, 221 days
Rita Bell López Vences	Lottery	—	—	4 April 2023	3 years, 221 days
Jorge Montaño Ventura	Lottery	—	—	4 April 2023	3 years, 221 days
Arturo Manuel Chávez López	334–127	—	—	22 April 2026	203 days
Frida Denisse Gómez Puga	334–127	—	—	22 April 2026	203 days

== Political parties and associations ==
IFE was charged with the registration, funding and oversight of national political parties. Starting 2014, INE was also charged with oversight over local political parties, which before 2014 were registered by each state's Electoral Institute. Rules and guidelines for the registration of political parties are outlined in the Federal Code of Electoral Institutions and Procedures.

In addition, INE registers national political associations, which are intended to assist in the development of democratic life and the country's political culture, as well as being intended to create a better informed public opinion. The creation of a national political association is usually regarded as the first step towards the creation of a full-fledged political party.

== Professional Electoral Service ==
To guarantee a professional and specialized performance of its responsibilities, the INE used a special system of recruitment, selection, training, and evaluation of qualified staff to provide electoral services, especially in its fundamental areas, which are the ones directly linked with the preparation and organization of elections.

== Redistricting ==
Since the early 1990s, INE has held the authority to redraw local and federal congressional districts, and since 1996, INE has used a redistricting algorithm to redraw congressional districts. The INE Executive Board appoints a technical committee, which is made up of experts in cartography, demography, and statistics. The committee adopts an objective scoring function that includes criteria, such as population equality, compactness, preserving political boundaries, traveling time, and minority representation. Once the scoring function is adopted, the technical committee creates a proposed map using an optimization algorithm. Different optimization algorithms have been used at different times, such as simulated annealing and honeycomb optimization. Political parties have two opportunities to propose changes that score better on the objective scoring function before the committee makes a final recommendation for adoption. The interaction between the political parties and the committee, their proposed maps, and intermediate maps are not publicly available.

== Results ==
The first electoral process organised by INE was in the period 2014–2015. In total 2,159 candidates were elected at local, state and national levels. The increase in violence against women participating in electoral processes prompted the institution to prepare and adopt, together with other organizations, a protocol to eliminate violence against women in electoral processes.

In the 2018 general election, over 3,000 positions were filled by popular vote. Compared to previous elections, it was larger and more impactful on Mexico's politics. Despite severe challenges, such as 145 documented election-related deaths, the 2018 elections were generally considered free and fair.

== See also ==
- Voter Credential
