= List of The New York Times number-one books of 2026 =

The American daily newspaper The New York Times publishes multiple weekly lists ranking the best-selling books in the United States. The lists are split into three genres—fiction, nonfiction and children's books. Both the fiction and nonfiction lists are further split into multiple lists.

== Fiction ==
The following list ranks the number-one best-selling fiction books, in the combined print and e-books category.

Issue date	Title	Author(s)	Publisher	Ref.
January 4	The Widow	John Grisham	Doubleday	
January 11	The Housemaid	Freida McFadden	Grand Central Publishing	
January 18	The Housemaid	Freida McFadden	Grand Central Publishing	
January 25	The Housemaid	Freida McFadden	Grand Central Publishing	
February 1	The Correspondent	Virginia Evans	Crown	
February 8	Twelve Months	Jim Butcher	Ace	
February 15	Dear Debbie	Freida McFadden	Poisoned Pen Press	
February 22	Stolen in Death	J. D. Robb	St. Martin's Press	
March 1	Theo of Golden	Allen Levi	Atria Books	
March 8	Theo of Golden	Allen Levi	Atria Books	
March 15	The Crossroads	C. J. Box	G. P. Putnam's Sons	
March 22	Theo of Golden	Allen Levi	Atria Books	
March 29	Judge Stone	Viola Davis and James Patterson	Little, Brown and Company and JVL Media	
April 5	Project Hail Mary	Andy Weir	Ballantine Books	
April 12	Project Hail Mary	Andy Weir	Ballantine Books	
April 19	Game On	Navessa Allen	Slowburn	
April 26	Rites of the Starling	Devney Perry	Red Tower Books	
May 3	Hope Rises	David Baldacci	Grand Central Publishing	
May 10	Theo of Golden	Allen Levi	Atria Books	
May 17	Theo of Golden	Allen Levi	Atria Books	
May 24	Theo of Golden	Allen Levi	Atria Books	
May 31	A Parade of Horribles	Matt Dinniman	Ace	
June 7	The Ballad of Falling Dragons	Sarah A. Parker	Avon	
June 14	The Divorce	Freida McFadden	Poisoned Pen Press	
June 21	Whistler	Ann Patchett	Harper	
June 28	Theo of Golden	Allen Levi	Atria Books	
July 5	Theo of Golden	Allen Levi	Atria Books	
July 12	Theo of Golden	Allen Levi	Atria Books	
July 19	Theo of Golden	Allen Levi	Atria Books	
July 26	Theo of Golden	Allen Levi	Atria Books	
August 2	Ransom	Daniel Silva	Harper	
August 9	Theo of Golden	Allen Levi	Atria Books	
August 16	Theo of Golden	Allen Levi	Atria Books	
August 23	Adversary to the Villain	Hannah Nicole Maehrer	Red Tower Books	
August 30	Theo of Golden	Allen Levi	Atria Books	
September 6	Theo of Golden	Allen Levi	Atria Books	
September 13	Theo of Golden	Allen Levi	Atria Books	
September 20	The Knave and the Moon	Rachel Gillig	Orbit Books	
September 27	Fury in Death	J. D. Robb	St. Martin's Press	
October 4	Hollow Bones	Jodi Picoult	Ballantine Books	
October 11	Hollywood, Ending	John Green	Dutton Books	
October 18	Threshing Day	Rebecca Yarros	Red Tower Books	
October 25	The Witch	Freida McFadden	Poisoned Pen Press	
November 1	Threshing Day	Rebecca Yarros	Red Tower Books	
November 8	Miss Wolcott's Ghost	Louise Penny	Minotaur Books	
November 15	A Court of Splintered Harmony	Sarah J. Maas	Bloomsbury Publishing	
November 22	A Court of Splintered Harmony	Sarah J. Maas	Bloomsbury Publishing	
November 29	Split Second	Janet Evanovich	Atria Books	

== Nonfiction ==
The following list ranks the number-one best-selling nonfiction books, in the combined print and e-books category.

Issue date	Title	Author(s)	Publisher	Ref.
January 4	The Look	Michelle Obama with Meredith Koop	Crown	
January 11	1929	Andrew Ross Sorkin	Viking	
January 18	1929	Andrew Ross Sorkin	Viking	
January 25	1929	Andrew Ross Sorkin	Viking	
February 1	Strangers	Belle Burden	The Dial Press	
February 8	The Invisible Coup	Peter Schweizer	Harper	
February 15	The Invisible Coup	Peter Schweizer	Harper	
February 22	The Invisible Coup	Peter Schweizer	Harper	
March 1	Nobody's Girl	Virginia Roberts Giuffre	Alfred A. Knopf	
March 8	Stripped Down	Bunnie Xo	Dey Street Books	
March 15	Stripped Down	Bunnie Xo	Dey Street Books	
March 22	You with the Sad Eyes	Christina Applegate	Little, Brown and Company	
March 29	Kids, Wait Till You Hear This!	Liza Minnelli, as told to Michael Feinstein, with Josh Getlin and Heidi Evans	Grand Central Publishing	
April 5	Stripped Down	Bunnie Xo	Dey Street Books	
April 12	Strangers	Belle Burden	The Dial Press	
April 19	Strangers	Belle Burden	The Dial Press	
April 26	Strangers	Belle Burden	The Dial Press	
May 3	Famesick	Lena Dunham	Random House	
May 10	Strangers	Belle Burden	The Dial Press	
May 17	Dogs, Boys, and Other Things I've Cried About	Isabel Klee	William Morrow	
May 24	Strangers	Belle Burden	The Dial Press	
May 31	Suicidal Empathy	Gad Saad	Broadside Books	
June 7	Liar's Kingdom	Andrew Weissmann	Little, Brown and Company	
June 14	The Land and Its People	David Sedaris	Little, Brown and Company	
June 21	View from the East Wing	Jill Biden	Gallery Books	
June 28	Strangers	Belle Burden	The Dial Press	
July 5	Communion	JD Vance	Harper	
July 12	Regime Change	Maggie Haberman and Jonathan Swan	Simon & Schuster	
July 19	Regime Change	Maggie Haberman and Jonathan Swan	Simon & Schuster	
July 26	Regime Change	Maggie Haberman and Jonathan Swan	Simon & Schuster	
August 2	Regime Change	Maggie Haberman and Jonathan Swan	Simon & Schuster	
August 9	Regime Change	Maggie Haberman and Jonathan Swan	Simon & Schuster	
August 16	Regime Change	Maggie Haberman and Jonathan Swan	Simon & Schuster	
August 23	Regime Change	Maggie Haberman and Jonathan Swan	Simon & Schuster	
August 30	Regime Change	Maggie Haberman and Jonathan Swan	Simon & Schuster	
September 6	This Is Me	Hayden Panettiere	Grand Central Publishing	
September 13	Going Further	Ted Cruz	Sentinel	
September 20	This Is Me	Hayden Panettiere	Grand Central Publishing	
September 27	The Counterrevolution	Victor Davis Hanson	Basic Books	
October 4	The Perilous Fight	Colin Kaepernick with Nick Chiles	Legacy Lit	
October 11	Swan Song	Charles Spencer	Penguin Press	
October 18	The Steps	Sylvester Stallone	William Morrow	
October 25	One Helluva Ride	Michael Douglas with Shane Salerno and Michael Fleming Jr	Grand Central Publishing	
November 1	In the Shadow of Eight	Collin Gosselin with Allie Kingsley Baker	Grand Central Publishing	
November 8	In the Shadow of Eight	Collin Gosselin with Allie Kingsley Baker	Grand Central Publishing	
November 15	In the Shadow of Eight	Collin Gosselin with Allie Kingsley Baker	Grand Central Publishing	
November 22	In the Shadow of Eight	Collin Gosselin with Allie Kingsley Baker	Grand Central Publishing	
November 29	Daddy Issues	Sofia Franklyn	Simon & Schuster	

== See also ==
- Publishers Weekly list of bestselling novels in the United States in the 2020s
