= Strangers: A Memoir of Marriage =

Book by Belle Burden Bolles published in 2026

- Author: Belle Burden
- Publisher: The Dial Press (US) Ebury Publishing, PRH (UK)
- Publication date: January 13, 2026
- Media type: Book
- Pages: 256
- ISBN: 9780593733318
- OCLC: 1513888558

Strangers: A Memoir of Marriage is a 2026 non-fiction book by Belle Burden, detailing her separation and divorce during the COVID-19 pandemic. Burden first published a version of the story in the "Modern Love" column of the The New York Times in June 2023. The book was published by Penguin Random House and debuted at #1 on the The New York Times Best Seller List.

== Content ==
Burden, the child of Amanda Burden and Carter Burden, describes her upbringing in a prominent old money family. Burden was educated as a lawyer. She and her husband (to whom she gives the alias James) met as colleagues at a large law firm in New York City. After a quick courtship, Burden and James were married and had three children. The couple bought an apartment in New York City and a second home on Martha's Vineyard, using money from two inherited trust funds belonging to Burden; Burden gives James 50% ownership of each. Burden describes and analyzes her decisions to stop working and turn over financial management of their lives to James, who became a prominent hedge fund manager. In 2020, shortly after the beginning of the COVID-19 pandemic, Burden receives a message from a stranger who states that his wife is having an affair with Burden's husband, James. James admits to the affair and separates from the family, stating that he does not want custody of their children. Burden portrays the process of divorce and its psychological impact on her, as well as its ramifications within their social circle and on their children.

== Reception ==
Reception for the book was positive. Reviewers commented on the impact of Burden's social class and considerable wealth; the New York Times wrote that "while Strangers is not necessarily about privilege and status, those are, inescapably, Burden’s worlds." CNBC and the Wall Street Journal suggested that the book could be taken as a cautionary tale of the financial risks in marriage for women, though The New Yorker noted that Burden's wealth protected her from such risk. A review in the Washington Post stated that "there is an admirable graciousness and restraint to her storytelling". The Boston Globe commented that the book's central question is whether it is possible to truly know someone else, even in marriage, and wrote that Strangers is a "brutally resonant, clear-eyed portrait that strikes universal chords."

The book spent several months in 2026 on The New York Times best seller list, including 7 weeks at the top.

== Film adaptation ==
After a bidding war, Netflix purchased rights to produce an adaptation of the book, starring and executive produced by Gwyneth Paltrow.
