= Belle Burden =

American author

- Born: Flobelle Fairbanks Burden; 1969 or 1970 (age 56–57); New York, U.S.
- Education: Harvard University; New York University
- Occupations: Author; Lawyer
- Notable work: Strangers: A Memoir of Marriage
- Spouse: Henry Davis (married 1999-2020)
- Children: 3
- Parent(s): Amanda Burden, Carter Burden

Flobelle Fairbanks Burden, better known as Belle Burden, is an American author and lawyer. She is best known for her book, Strangers: A Memoir of Marriage.

== Early life and education ==
Belle Burden was born to Amanda Burden, an urban planner in New York City, and Carter Burden, a philanthropist and politician. Through her mother, she is the granddaughter of Vogue editor and socialite Babe Paley and Stanley G. Mortimer Jr, an advertising executive. Through her father, she is the granddaughter of photographer Shirley Burden and actress Flobelle Fairbanks Burden (otherwise known as Florence Fair), and is a descendent of the Vanderbilt family. Burden grew up on the Upper East Side of New York.

Burden graduated from Phillips Exeter Academy, where she won prizes for her creative writing. She would later attend Harvard University, pivoting from an interest in creative writing to law. Burden graduated cum laude from Harvard and later received a Juris Doctor degree from New York University.

== Career ==
Burden started her law career as a corporate attorney at the New York-based law firm Davis Polk & Wardwell. She later served as general counsel for Digital Telemedia, an internet service provider in New York, and was a trustee of the Pierpont Morgan Library. Burden has taken on pro bono immigration cases alongside other lawyers, focusing on juvenile and immigration law.

Following Burden's divorce, in 2023, she submitted an essay to the New York Times Modern Love column, titled "Was I Married to a Stranger?" After its release, Burden fielded interest from multiple editors before signing with Dial Press. In 2026, Burden released her book, Strangers: A Memoir of Marriage. The book became a New York Times Best Seller, debuting at #1 on the hardcover nonfiction list. After Netflix acquired the film rights to the book, it was announced that Burden would be played by Gwyneth Paltrow.

As an author, Burden is represented by The Book Group and UTA. She has made appearances on Good Morning America and Oprah Winfrey's podcast.

== Bibliography ==
- Strangers: A Memoir of Marriage (2026) ISBN 9780593733318

== Personal life ==
Burden married Henry Patterson Davis in 1999 and went on to raise three children with him. They would divorce after twenty years, during the COVID-19 pandemic. Burden detailed the divorce in her book, Strangers: A Memoir of Marriage. Burden owns homes in Manhattan and Martha's Vineyard.

In March 2024, Burden wrote an opinion piece published in the New York Times, criticizing the portrayal of her grandmother, Babe Paley, in Feud: Capote vs. The Swans.
