= James Patterson and Bookshop.org Prize =

American literary award for debut books

- Awarded for: Outstanding debut books
- Sponsored by: Bookshop.org and James Patterson
- First award: 2026
- Website: bookshop.org/info/the-james-patterson-bookshop-org-prize

The James Patterson and Bookshop.org Prize, established in 2026, is an American literary award for debut books. The award is sponsored by Bookshop.org and American author James Patterson, and independent booksellers select winners and nominees. Prize winners receive US$15,000, while the runner-up receives US$10,000. To be eligible, debut books must be published in the United States within the previous year.

== Recipients ==
Award winners and nominees
Year	Author	Title	Result	Ref.
2026	Virginia Evans	The Correspondent	Winner	
2026	Milo Todd	The Lilac People	Runner-Up	
2026	Sarah Aziza	The Hollow Half	Shortlist	
2026	Venessa Vida Kelley	When the Tides Held the Moon	Shortlist	
2026	Joss Richard	It's Different This Time	Shortlist	
