= Eyes Right! =

1926 film

- Directed by: Louis Chaudet
- Written by: Leslie Curtis; Ernest Grayman
- Produced by: Otto K. Schreier
- Starring: Francis X. Bushman Jr.; Florence Fair; Dora Dean
- Cinematography: Allen M. Davey
- Production company: Otto K. Schreier Productions
- Distributed by: Goodwill Productions
- Release date: June 29, 1926
- Country: United States
- Languages: Silent; English intertitles

Eyes Right! is a 1926 American silent drama film directed by Louis Chaudet and starring Francis X. Bushman Jr., Florence Fair and Dora Dean.

== Cast ==
- Francis X. Bushman Jr. as Ted Winters
- Florence Fair as Betty Phillips
- Dora Dean as Alice Murdock
- Larry Kent as Maj. Snodgrass
- Frederick Vroom as Col. Thomas A. Davis
- Robert Hale as Lt. Smith

== Bibliography ==
- Munden, Kenneth White. The American Film Institute Catalog of Motion Pictures Produced in the United States, Part 1. University of California Press, 1997.
