= I Am a Thief =

1934 film by Robert Florey

- Directed by: Robert Florey
- Produced by: Henry Blanke
- Cinematography: Sidney Hickox
- Edited by: Terry O. Morse
- Music by: Bernhard Kaun
- Distributed by: Warner Bros. Pictures
- Release date: November 24, 1934
- Running time: 64 minutes
- Country: United States
- Language: English

I Am a Thief is a 1934 American crime-drama film directed by Robert Florey.

== Plot ==
An undercover police agent hopes to provoke, and catch, an international jewel thief, as he transports the famous Karenina diamonds from Paris across Europe to Istanbul on the Orient Express, along with a trainload of suspicious characters.

== Cast ==
- Mary Astor as Odette Mauclair
- Ricardo Cortez as Pierre Londais
- Dudley Digges as Colonel Jackson
- Robert Barrat as Baron Von Kampf
- Irving Pichel as Count Trentini
- Hobart Cavanaugh as Daudet
- Ferdinand Gottschalk as M. Cassiet
- Arthur Aylesworth as Francois
- Florence Fair as Mme. Cassiet
- Frank Reicher as Max Bolen
- John Wray as Antonio Borricci
- Oscar Apfel as Auctioneer
- unbilled cast members include Clay Clement and Gino Corrado
