= Allen Levi =

American writer

Allen Levi (born 1955 or 1956) is an American writer. He is author of three books: Oliviatown (2003), The Last Sweet Mile (2014), and Theo of Golden (2023).

Levi was born in Bay Minette, Alabama. He graduated from the University of Georgia and was a practicing lawyer in the 1980s. After thirteen years of practicing law, he studied fiction at the University of Edinburgh and then began a career as a singer-songwriter, with stints performing for Young Life.

As of 2026, Theo of Golden has spent fourteen (non-consecutive) weeks at number one on the New York Times fiction list.

Theo of Golden was originally self-published. Levi worked on promotion along with his niece, Aron Ritchie. In 2025, Levi agreed to be represented by Suzanne Gluck, a literary agent with William Morris Endeavor. This led to a publishing deal with Simon & Schuster.

== Bibliography ==
=== Novels ===
- Theo of Golden (Atria, 2023)

=== Memoir ===
- The Last Sweet Mile (Rabbit Room, 2014)

=== Children's literature ===
- Oliviatown (with illustrator Garry Pound) (Children's Miracle Network, 2003)
