= Urban Land =

Urban Land Magazine
- Editor: Sibley Fleming
- Categories: Real estate development
- Frequency: 4 times per year
- Circulation: 41,005
- Publisher: Peter Walker
- Founded: 1941
- Company: Urban Land Institute
- Country: United States
- Based in: Washington, D.C.
- Language: English
- Website: urbanland.uli.org
- ISSN: 0042-0891

Urban Land is a magazine published by the Urban Land Institute (ULI). It is published 4 times a year and is headquartered in Washington, D.C. Urban Land. Its articles cover a wide range of international topics, while concentrating on the needs of professionals in the real estate development and land use industry.

Urban Land magazine regularly publishes original stories and commentaries from notable land use leaders and urban thinkers. Past and current contributors have included such individuals as former Bogotá mayor Enrique Peñalosa; urban scholar Richard Florida; economist and Brookings Institution fellow Anthony Downs; former director of land-use planning for The Conservation Fund Ed McMahon; former Secretary of Housing and Urban Development (HUD) Henry Cisneros; and Brookings Institution fellow Christopher B. Leinberger.

== Background ==
ULI first began publishing Urban Land magazine in 1941 as a newsletter for members. Its first issue was four pages in length with the title typewritten as News Bulletin. In 2010, the magazine launched its web counterpart (urbanland.uli.org) which protected articles behind a member-only paywall. In 2011, ULI removed the magazine's paywall, making it one of the industry's first open access magazines.

== Apgar Urban Land Awards ==
Since 1991, the magazine's annual ULI Apgar Urban Land Award has recognized the most significant Urban Land magazine articles "that best contribute to the mission and current priorities of the institute." The award, founded by ULI Governor, Mahlon “Sandy” Apgar, was first presented between 1991 and 2006. ULI reintroduced the award in 2012 and its winners are currently selected by a committee that judges the articles on the criteria of relevance to current industry issues; the clarity of the author's argument and presentation; the strength of the author's analyses; and the overall value of the article in advancing the goals of ULI.
