= The Lilac People =

2025 novel by Milo Todd

- First edition cover
- Author: Milo Todd
- Language: English
- Publisher: Counterpoint
- Publication date: April 29, 2025
- Pages: 303
- Award: Lambda Literary Award for Transgender Literature (2026)
- ISBN: 978-1-640-09703-2

The Lilac People is a literary historical fiction novel by Milo Todd. Inspired by true events, the novel centers the experiences of the queer community during Nazi Germany. The Lilac People won the 2026 Lambda Literary Award for Transgender Literature and was a runner-up for the inaugural James Patterson and Bookshop.org Prize.

== Plot ==
In 1932, Berthold "Bertie" Durchdenwald works for the Institut für Sexualwissenschaft, a German sexology research institute headed by Magnus Hirschfeld, and spends his evenings at the queer Eldorado Club. Bertie is proud to receive a purple "transvestite card", which allows him to live openly as a transgender man in Berlin. As the Nazis gain power, however, his rights, as well as the rights of others in the queer community, are stripped away, while gay clubs are raided and the Institute is burned. Bertie escapes Berlin with his girlfriend, Sofie Hönig, and heads for a farm in Ulm owned by a friend's grandparents. After the elderly couple dies, Bertie and Sofie assume their identities and remain on the farm until the end of World War II.

In 1945, while the Allied forces are in Germany, Bertie and Sofie find a man in their field wearing Holocaust prison clothes. They learn he is Karl Fuchs, a transgender man who was held in the Dachau concentration camp and is now fleeing the Allied forces, who are imprisoning queer people. The trio decide to flee to the United States, with Bertie and Karl left having to decide how to manage their true identities.

== Background ==
Todd was inspired to write The Lilac People after seeing a post online stating that when the Allied forces arrived in Germany at the end of World War II, they imprisoned queer people. He began research on the topic and based the story on true events. Three characters are named to honor three masculine transgender or intersex people who survived Nazi Germany: Bertie is named after Berthold Buttgereit, Karl is named after Karl M. Baer, and Gert is named after Gerd Katter.

The novel's title comes from the song Germany cabaret song "Das lila Lied" ("The Lilac Song"), which has been considered the first gay anthem.

== Reception ==
=== Reviews ===
The Lilac People was well received by critics, including starred reviews from Foreword Reviews, Publishers Weekly, and Shelf Awareness.

Publishers Weekly described The Lilac People as a "stirring" and "timely historical drama", while BookReporter's Jana Siciliano called it "moving, fascinating and devastating".

Multiple reviewers discussed how Todd incorporates historical truths into the narrative. Siciliano, in particular, found that "Todd is deft in his handling of difficult historical details and the reality with which he imbues Bertie's life. [...] Bertie's adventures are interwoven with hard-hitting historical facts that need to be in the froth of any discussion of the war and the post-war social constructs and movements". Shelf Awareness's Julia Kastner added, "Todd has made an enormous contribution to historical fiction with his own research and this beautiful, touching narrative." Kirkus Reviews highlighted how the story "conveys the terrors and uncertainties of life during wartime", as well as the "ambitions and joys of Berlin's queer community". Isabella Zhou, writing for Foreword Reviews, discussed how The Lilac People portrays the queer community before and after World War II, including the "exuberant joy in the 1930s" (despite "an atmosphere of unease"), as well as the "intensified anxiety and uncertainty from the unexpected, violent invasions" from Allied forces.

=== Awards and honors ===
Awards for The Lilac People
Year	Award	Result	Ref.
2025	Goodreads Choice Award for Readers' Favorite Debut Novel	Nominee	
2025	Goodreads Choice Award for Readers' Favorite Historical Fiction	Nominee	
2026	Barbara Gittings Literature Award	Honor	
2026	‍James Patterson and Bookshop.org Prize	Runner-Up	
2026	Lambda Literary Award for Transgender Literature	Winner	
