= Charlie Rose =

American TV interviewer and journalist (born 1942)

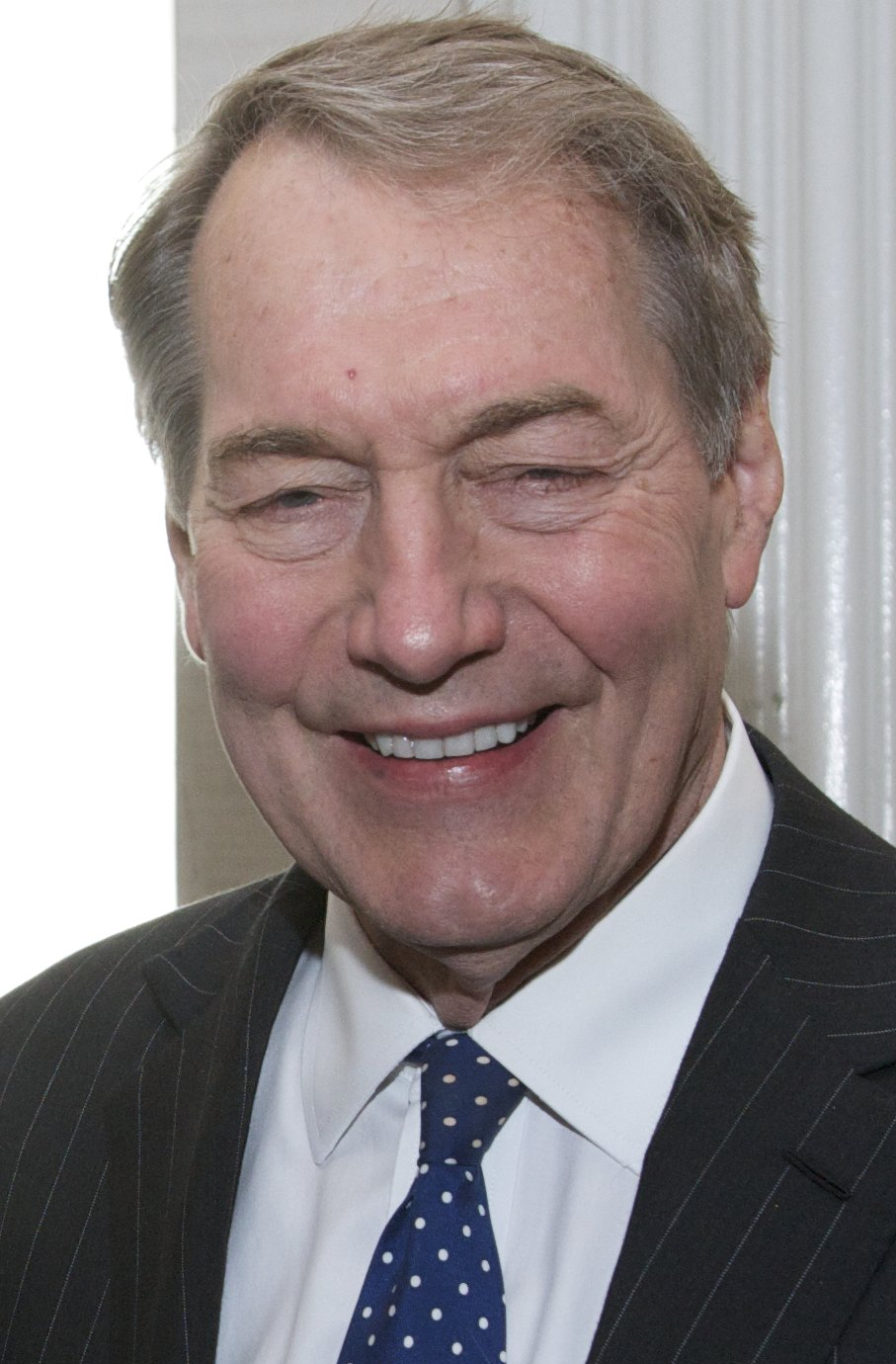
- Rose in 2014
- Born: Charles Peete Rose Jr. January 5, 1942 (age 84); Henderson, North Carolina, U.S.
- Education: Duke University (BA, JD)
- Occupations: Talk show host, journalist
- Years active: 1972–present
- Notable credits: Charlie Rose; 60 Minutes II; 60 Minutes; Person to Person; CBS News Nightwatch; CBS This Morning; Charlie Rose Conversations
- Spouse: Mary King (m. 1968; div. 1980)
- Partner: Amanda Burden (1992–2006)
- Website: www.charlierose.com

Charles Peete Rose Jr. (born January 5, 1942) is an American journalist and talk show host. From 1991 to 2017, he was the host and executive producer of the talk show Charlie Rose on PBS and Bloomberg LP. On the show, he interviewed writers, politicians, athletes, entertainers, businesspersons, leaders, scientists, intellectuals, and fellow journalists. The show was known for its distinguished stature and intellectual tone.

Rose also co-anchored CBS This Morning from 2012 to 2017 alongside Gayle King and Norah O'Donnell, where he interviewed many celebrities, institutional leaders, and political figures. Rose formerly substituted for the anchor of the CBS Evening News. In 2012, Rose, along with Lara Logan, hosted the revived CBS classic Person to Person, a news program during which celebrities are interviewed in their homes, originally hosted from 1953 to 1961 by Edward R. Murrow. Since 2022, Rose has hosted the online interviews Charlie Rose Conversations on his personal website. Rose occasionally appeared in films and television shows including Breaking Bad and House of Cards.

In November 2017, Rose was fired from PBS, Bloomberg, and CBS after The Washington Post published multiple in-house allegations of sexual misconduct from the late 1990s to 2011. Rose responded to those allegations by admitting to having behaved insensitively at times but did not believe that all of the allegations were accurate, and later suggested women were exploiting the #MeToo campaign. The allegations led to Rose being stripped of several awards and honors. In November 2024, a sexual harassment lawsuit ended with a settlement in which the three plaintiffs acknowledged there was no ill intent on the part of Rose for his conduct.

== Early life and education ==
Rose was born in Henderson, North Carolina, the only child of Margaret (née Frazier) and Charles Peete Rose Sr., tobacco farmers who owned a country store. As a child, Rose lived above his parents' store in Henderson, and helped out with the family business from age seven. In a Fresh Dialogues interview, Rose related that as a child, his insatiable curiosity was constantly getting him in trouble.

A high school basketball star at Henderson High School, Rose entered Duke University intending to pursue a degree in a pre-med track. However, he became interested in politics during an internship at the office of North Carolina's Democratic senator B. Everett Jordan. Rose graduated in 1964 with a B.A. in history. At Duke, he was a member of the Kappa Alpha Order fraternity. Rose stayed at Duke to earn a J.D. from the Duke University School of Law in 1968. While attending Duke, Rose met his first wife, Mary (née King).

== Career ==
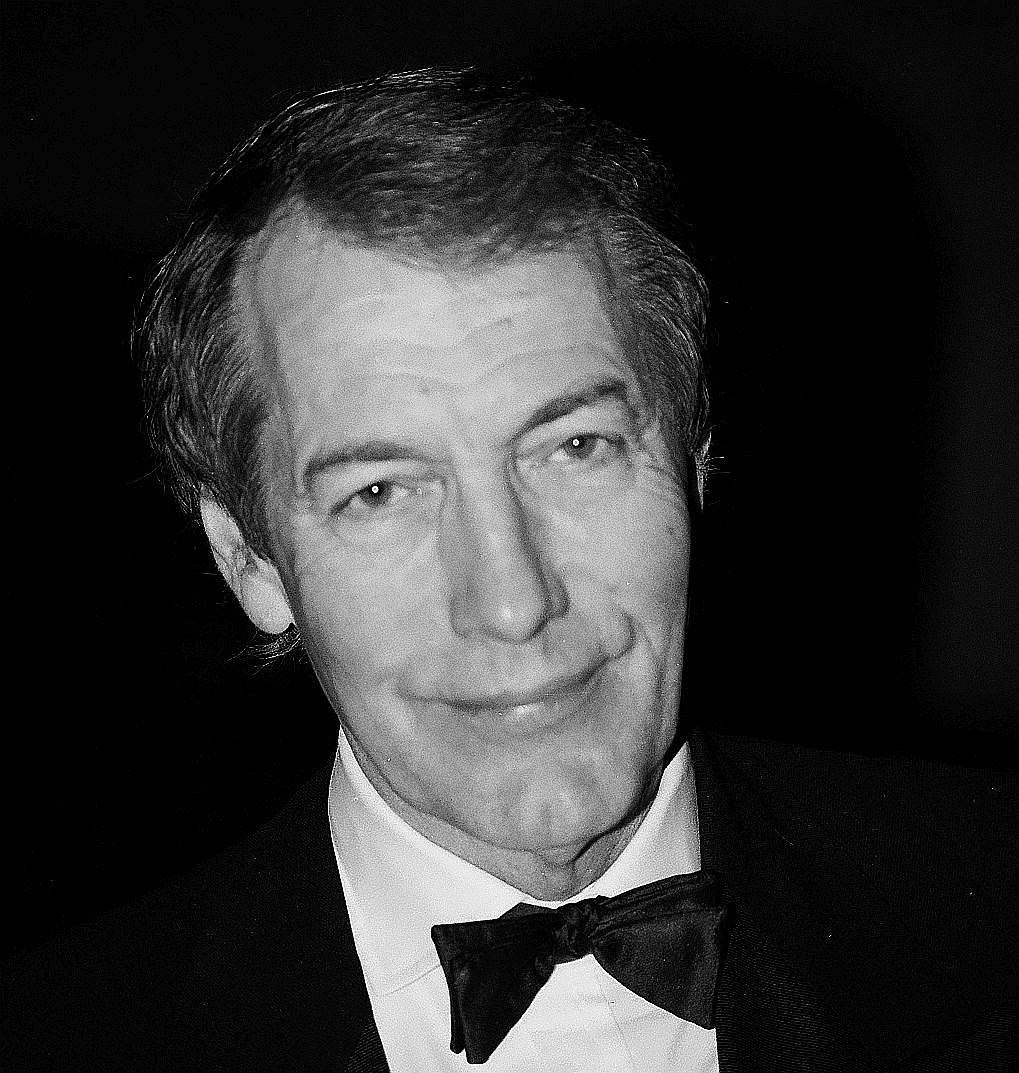
Rose in Washington, D.C. in 2000

After his wife was hired by the BBC (in New York), Rose handled some assignments for the BBC on a freelance basis. In 1972, while working at New York bank Bankers Trust, he landed a job as a weekend reporter for WPIX-TV. Rose's "break" came in 1974, after Bill Moyers hired him as managing editor for the PBS series Bill Moyers' International Report. In 1975, Moyers appointed him as executive producer of Bill Moyers Journal. Rose soon began appearing on camera. "A Conversation with Jimmy Carter", which aired on Moyers's TV series U.S.A.: People and Politics, won a 1976 Peabody Award. He then worked at several networks honing his interview skills, until NBC affiliate KXAS-TV in Dallas–Fort Worth hired him as program manager and provided the late-night time slot that became The Charlie Rose Show.

=== CBS News ===
Rose worked for CBS News from 1984 to 1990 as the anchor of CBS News Nightwatch, the network's first late-night news broadcast, which often featured him doing interviews with notable people in a format similar to that of his later PBS show. The Nightwatch broadcast of Rose's interview with Charles Manson won a News & Documentary Emmy Award in 1987. In 1990, Rose left CBS to serve as anchor of Personalities, a Fox TV-produced syndicated program, but six weeks into production and unhappy with the show's soundbite-driven populist tabloid-journalism approach to stories, he left.

=== Charlie Rose ===
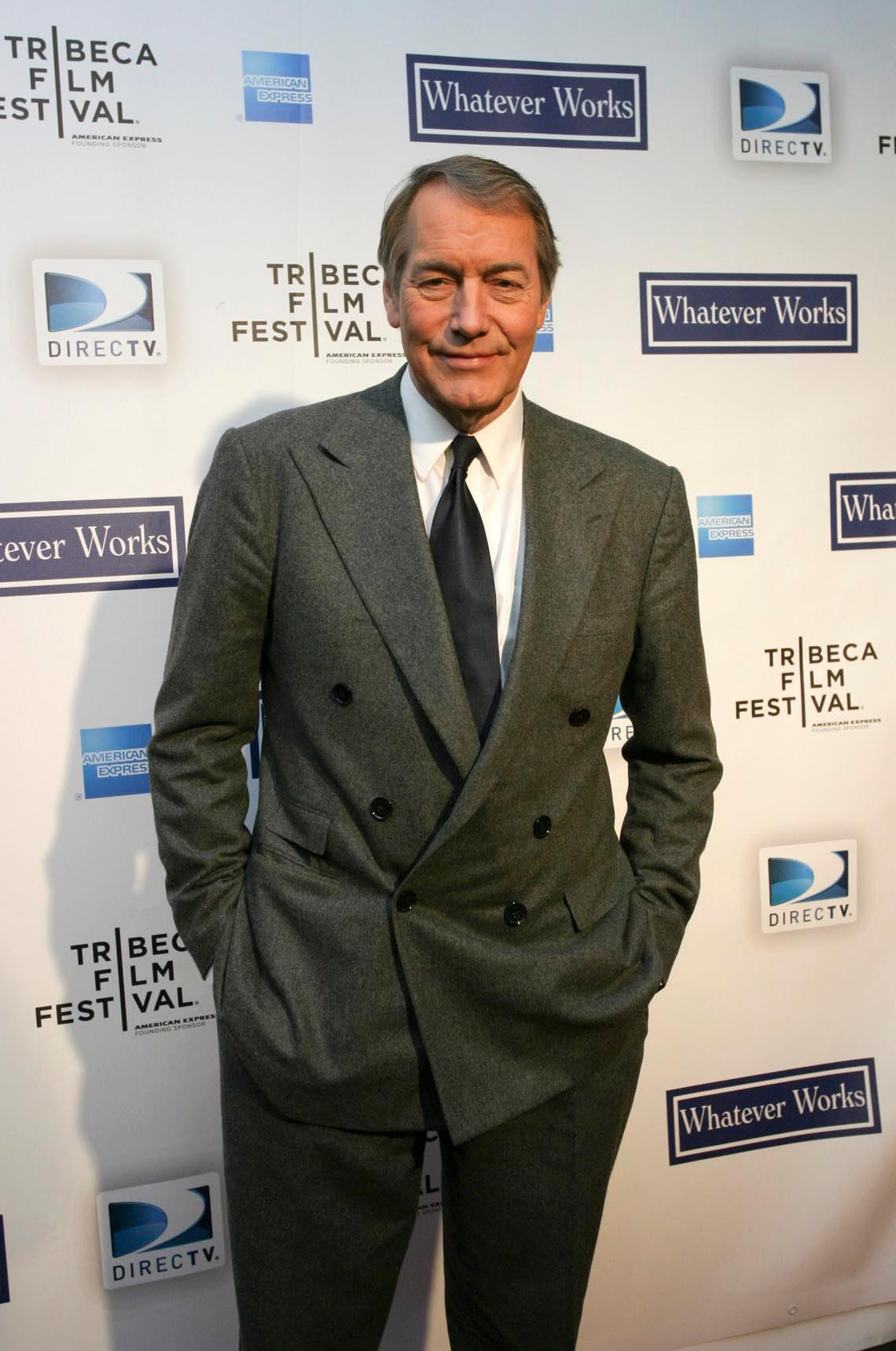
Rose at the premiere of Whatever Works at the 2009 Tribeca Film Festival

On September 30, 1991, Charlie Rose premiered on PBS station Thirteen/WNET and was nationally fed on PBS beginning in January 1993. In 1994, Rose moved the show to a studio owned by Bloomberg LP, which allowed for high-definition video via satellite-remote interviews. On the show, he interviewed thinkers, writers, politicians, athletes, entertainers, businesspersons, leaders, scientists, and fellow newsmakers. The show was known for its distinguished stature and intellectual tone. Barack Obama made 11 appearances on the show as a senator, presidential candidate, and as president. Other former presidents who appeared on the program include Jimmy Carter, George H. W. Bush, Bill Clinton, and George W. Bush. Donald Trump appeared on the program as a citizen but not as president.

Filmmakers who appeared on the show included Martin Scorsese, Werner Herzog, Sydney Pollack, Quentin Tarantino, Brian de Palma, Oliver Stone, Roman Polanski, Tim Burton, Sidney Lumet, Terry Gilliam, David Lynch, Guillermo del Toro, Peter Jackson, Wes Anderson, Ron Howard, George Lucas, Peter Bogdanovich, Mike Nichols, Sofia Coppola, Spike Lee, and Noah Baumbach.

Comedians who appeared on the show included George Carlin, Don Rickles, Louis C.K., Jerry Seinfeld, Chris Rock, Joan Rivers, Jon Stewart, Aziz Ansari, Bill Murray, Steve Martin, Robin Williams, Bill Maher, Ricky Gervais, John Oliver, and Key & Peele. Rose also hosted a variety of film critics including Roger Ebert, Janet Maslin, Stanley Kauffmann, Richard Corliss, Richard Schickel, David Denby, Andrew Sarris, and A. O. Scott.

Guest hosts included A. O. Scott, Judd Apatow, Seth Meyers, Anthony Mason, Jon Meacham, Katie Couric, and Molly Haskell. The show ran a total of 26 years from 1991 to 2017.

=== 60 Minutes ===
Rose was a correspondent for 60 Minutes II from its inception in January 1999 until its cancellation in September 2005, and was named a correspondent on 60 Minutes in 2008. When asked what makes a good interviewee Rose responded, "[it] is somebody who wants to engage and who views it as an opportunity to express their ideas, to have their ideas tested, to listen to the questions and to be as responsive to the questions as they can. Someone who is spontaneous, authentic, engaged, and passionate. That's the kind of person that'll give you a good interview."

For 60 Minutes Rose has interviewed such people as Russian President Vladimir Putin, Syrian President Bashar al-Assad, Apple Inc. business executive Tim Cook, political strategist Steve Bannon, comedian Larry David, stage actor Lin-Manuel Miranda, and actor Sean Penn.

He was a member of the board of directors of Citadel Broadcasting Corporation from 2003 to 2009. In May 2010, he delivered the commencement address at North Carolina State University.

=== CBS This Morning ===
On November 15, 2011, it was announced that Rose would return to CBS to help anchor CBS This Morning, replacing The Early Show, commencing January 9, 2012, along with co-anchors Gayle King and Erica Hill. In July 2012, Norah O'Donnell replaced Hill on the program. The show received high ratings due to their chemistry.

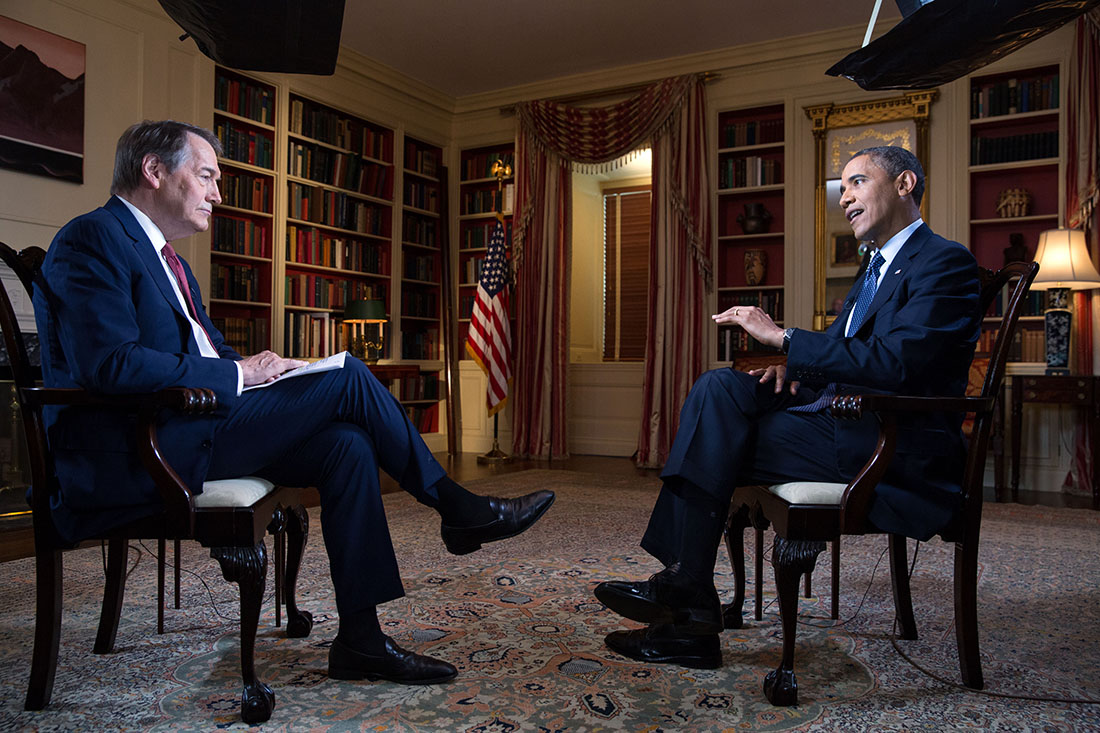
Rose interviews President Barack Obama in 2013.

Rose interviewed many celebrities, institutional leaders, and political figures, including Donald Trump (1992); Bill Gates (1996); Steve Jobs (1996); Sean Penn (2008 & 2016); Syrian President Bashar al-Assad (2013), for which he won a second Peabody Award; U.S. President Barack Obama and his wife Michelle (2012); U.S. business magnate Warren Buffett; David Rockefeller; MIT Linguistics professor Noam Chomsky (2003); actor/producer Leonardo DiCaprio (2004); comedians Louis C.K. and George Carlin; actor Christoph Waltz; director Quentin Tarantino; actor Bradley Cooper; Larry Ellison, the co-founder and then CEO of Oracle Corporation; former Iranian empress Farah Pahlavi; Vladimir Putin (2015); and tennis champion Maria Sharapova.

=== Charlie Rose Conversations ===
On April 14, 2022, in his first public appearance since 2017, when multiple women accused him of sexual harassment, Rose released an interview with billionaire Warren Buffett. The interview was uploaded to his own personal website and is listed as the first in a series called Charlie Rose Conversations. Subsequent episodes have included interviews with Thomas Friedman, Ray Dalio, Fatima Gailani, Isabella Rossellini, David Petraeus, and others.

=== Other television appearances ===
Rose made a cameo appearance on the TV series Breaking Bad in the penultimate episode, "Granite State" (season 5, episode 15, first broadcast September 22, 2013). Rose is seen on TV interviewing the characters Gretchen and Elliott Schwartz, which is watched by the character Walter White.

=== Debate Host in 2026 ===
Rose will host a series called It's Up for Debate; the show for Oct 21, 2026, features Andrew Yang vs Marjorie Taylor Greene.

== Filmography ==
=== Film ===
Year	Title	Role	Notes	Ref.
1998	Primary Colors	Himself		
2006	The Da Vinci Code	Book signing party guest	Uncredited	
2008	Elegy	Himself		
2011	The Ides of March	Himself		
2014	Top Five	Himself		
2015	Louder Than Bombs	Himself		
2016	Batman v Superman: Dawn of Justice	Himself		

=== Television ===
Year	Title	Role	Notes	Ref.
2000	The Simpsons	Himself	Episode: "Kill the Alligator and Run"	
2013	Breaking Bad	Himself	Episode: "Granite State"	
2013	The Good Wife	Himself	Episode: "A More Perfect Union"	
2017	House of Cards	Himself	Episode: "Chapter 53"	

Rose and his show were parodied in the Wes Anderson film The Royal Tenenbaums (2001) and in the first episode of BoJack Horseman in 2014.

== Influence ==
In 2009, Rose encouraged a discussion between the leaders of NBC and Fox News that eventually led to a mutual reduction in ad hominem attacks between Keith Olbermann and Bill O'Reilly on their respective news programs.

== Awards and honors ==
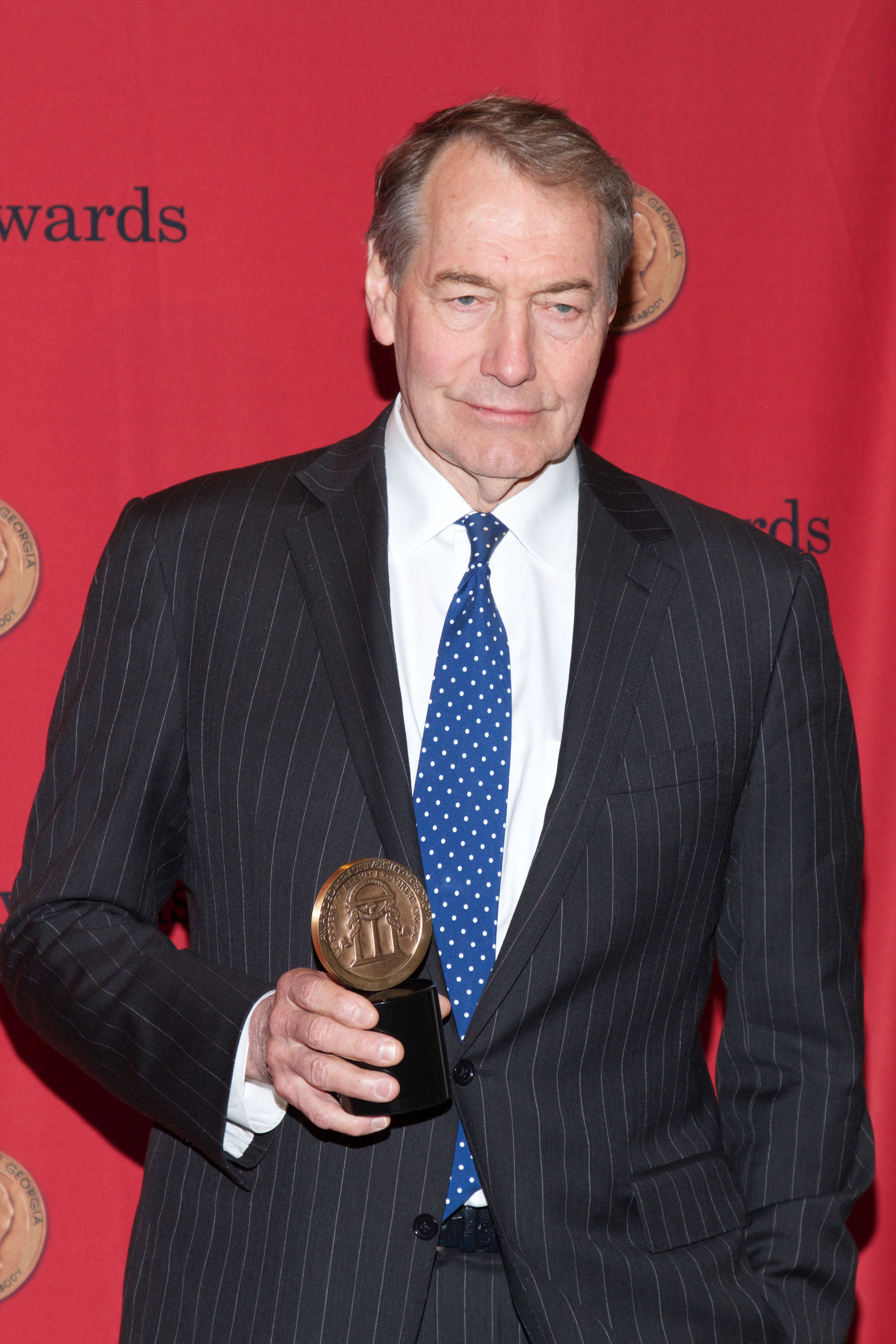
Rose at the Peabody Awards in 2014

Rose was awarded the 2014 Vincent Scully Prize by the National Building Museum. The prize is awarded for "exemplary practice, scholarship or criticism in architecture, historic preservation and urban design" according to the Museum. The award to Rose was stated as being due to his having "interviewed leaders of architecture and design and led 'insightful and substantive conversations' about the growth of cities and urban development."

Amanda Burden, a former director of the New York City Department of City Planning, who was in a relationship with him from 1993 to 2006, spoke at the award ceremony in November 2014. Rose received an honorary doctorate from the State University of New York at Oswego on October 16, 2014, during the college's annual Lewis B. O'Donnell Media Summit, for his contributions in the broadcast, media, and television industries. In 2016, Duke University awarded him an honorary degree.

The sexual misconduct allegations against Rose in 2017 led to him being stripped of his several awards and honors, as had happened to Bill Cosby amid his own sexual misconduct cases. On May 8, 2016, he received an honorary degree from Sewanee: The University of the South. There were calls for Sewanee officials to strip Rose of the degree, and, as of March 21, 2018, all honors from Sewanee have been rescinded. The State University of New York at Oswego Board of Trustees voted to revoke Rose's honorary degree on January 23, 2018.

On November 21, 2017, the Roman Catholic Diocese of Rockville Centre rescinded a planned award to Rose. The Diocese was set to honor him as a "leader in broadcast media". Three days later, the Walter Cronkite Award for Excellence in Journalism given to him in 2015 was rescinded by the Walter Cronkite School of Journalism and Mass Communication. On the same day, officials at University of Kansas's School of Journalism and Mass Communications rescinded the National Citation Award it gave to Rose in 2017.

On December 4, 2017, officials at Duke University's DeWitt Wallace Center for Media & Democracy rescinded the Futrell Award it gave him in September 2000. The award is given to outstanding Duke graduates who work in journalism. Montclair State University officials were considering whether to revoke the honorary doctorate it gave to him in 2002. The National Building Museum has made no public announcement on whether the 2014 Vincent Scully Prize has been withdrawn from Rose, but his name no longer appears on the list of winners on the organisation's website.

Officials at University of North Carolina at Chapel Hill's Hussman School of Journalism and Media considered the fate of Rose's 1999 induction into the N.C. Journalism Hall of Fame. School officials ultimately decided to keep him in the Hall of Fame, while amending his Hall of Fame biography to include details of the sexual misconduct allegations.

== Personal life ==
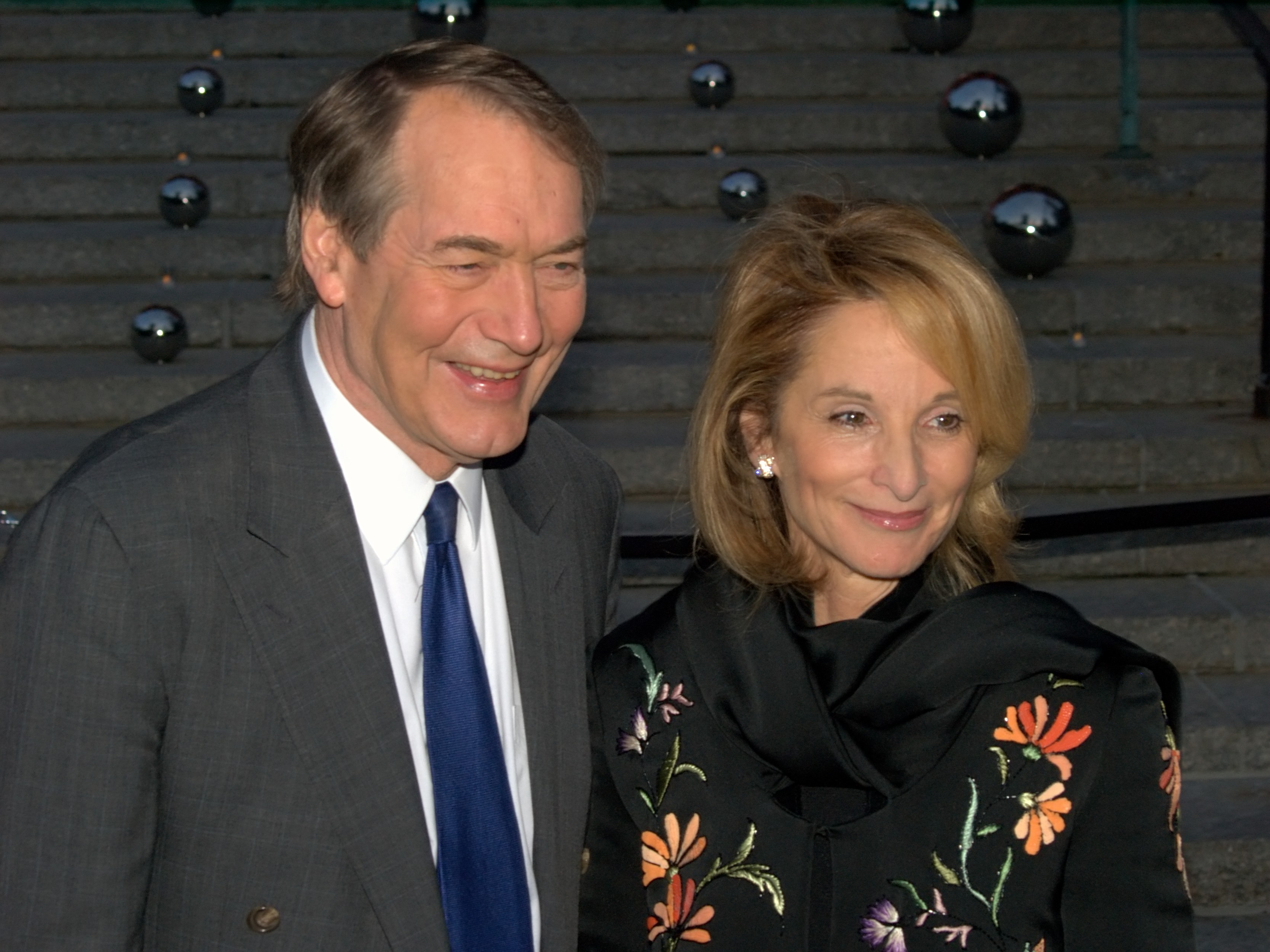
Rose with Amanda Burden in 2010

Rose was married to Mary Rose (née King) from 1968 until their divorce in 1980. In 1992, he began dating socialite and former New York City Planning Commissioner Amanda Burden, a stepdaughter of CBS founder William S. Paley. In 2011, he told a Financial Times reporter that he and Burden had stopped dating around 2006.

On March 29, 2006, after experiencing shortness of breath in Syria, he was flown to Paris and underwent surgery for mitral valve repair in the Georges-Pompidou European Hospital. His surgery was performed under the supervision of Alain Carpentier, a pioneer of the procedure. Rose returned to the air on June 12, 2006, with Bill Moyers and Yvette Vega (the show's executive producer), to discuss his surgery and recuperation. In February 2017, he announced he would undergo another surgery to replace the same valve.

Rose owns a large house in Henderson, North Carolina, a 5,500-square-foot (465-square-meter) beach house in Bellport, New York, and an apartment in The Sherry-Netherland of New York City, each worth several million dollars. Rose also owns apartments in Washington, D.C., and Paris. In 1990, he purchased a 525-acre (212-ha) soybean farm near Oxford, North Carolina, for use as a country retreat. He named the property Grassy Creek Farm.

Rose is a member of the Council on Foreign Relations. He is also a member of the Deepdale Golf Club on Long Island.

== Sexual misconduct allegations ==
On November 20, 2017, eight women who were employees of, or aspired to work for Rose accused him of various acts of sexual misconduct including harassment, groping, and making lewd phone calls. Those accusations, which started amid the Harvey Weinstein sexual abuse cases and Kevin Spacey sexual misconduct allegations and made in a report in The Washington Post, dealt with conduct from the late 1990s to 2011. On the day the article on the women's statements was published, PBS and Bloomberg LP suspended distribution of his show, and CBS announced that it was suspending the broadcaster pending an investigation. CBS, PBS, and Bloomberg formally cut ties with him the following day. Rose issued a statement:

I deeply apologize for my inappropriate behavior. I am greatly embarrassed. I have behaved insensitively at times, and I accept responsibility for that, though I do not believe that all of these allegations are accurate. I always felt that I was pursuing shared feelings, even though I now realize I was mistaken.

In May 2018, 27 more women accused him of sexual harassment, including groping and suggestive comments. This brought the total number of women who have accused him of abusive behavior and sexual harassment to 35. On August 31, 2018, he filed a motion to dismiss a lawsuit that was filed by three women on May 4, 2018, suggesting the women were exploiting the #MeToo campaign. In September 2019, Rose was sued for verbal harassment by Gina Riggi, his former makeup artist of 20 years.

Rose's firing as a co-anchor on CBS This Morning was covered by CBS, the day after the report was published. His former co-hosts Gayle King and Norah O'Donnell confronted the matter live on air. King stated that she was still "reeling" and "really struggling". O'Donnell stated "there is no excuse for this alleged behavior" and both agreed he "does not get a pass here" for his behavior.

John Dickerson, former host of Face the Nation, replaced Rose as a co-anchor on CBS This Morning, and Christiane Amanpour took over for his roles on PBS. In 2018, an exposé published by The Hollywood Reporter described his life after being fired as one that is "lonely". In 2019, Gayle King stated that she keeps in contact and is still friends with him: "I don't know what his second act is, but Charlie is a very smart guy. There must be room for redemption."

On November 26, 2024, the sexual harassment lawsuit brought by three former CBS This Morning employees in 2018 ended with a settlement. In settling the lawsuit, the plaintiffs acknowledged there was "no ill intent" on the part of Rose for his conduct.

== See also ==
- New Yorkers in journalism
