= The Correspondent (novel) =

2025 novel by Virginia Evans

- First edition hardcover
- Author: Virginia Evans
- Language: English
- Genre: Epistolary novel
- Publisher: Crown Publishing Group
- Publication date: April 29, 2025
- Publication place: United States
- Pages: 304
- Awards: PEN/Hemingway Award for Debut Novel; Women's Prize for Fiction; James Patterson and Bookshop.org Prize
- ISBN: 9780241721254

The Correspondent is an epistolary novel by American author Virginia Evans. It was published on April 29, 2025, by Crown Publishing Group. The novel follows the letters and emails of a retired lawyer and chief clerk sent between 2012 and 2022. It is Evans' first published novel, after having completed seven unpublished novels. The novel was a slow-burn success, reaching the top of the New York Times Fiction Best Seller List on February 1, 2026. It won a PEN/Hemingway Award for Debut Novel, and received widespread acclaim from critics, also winning the 2026 Women's Prize for Fiction. A film adaptation starring Jane Fonda was announced on March 18, 2026.

== Background ==
The novel started as a writing exercise, and Evans had not originally planned to show it to anyone. It was written when Evans had "reached rock bottom", as her father-in-law was sick, the United States had locked down due to COVID-19, and she was on the verge of applying to law school due to her failure in finding a publisher for her seven previous novels. The character of Sybil is based in part on Evans' mother-in-law. The novel is inspired by Stoner and 84 Charing Cross Road.

== Synopsis ==
The novel follows Sybil Van Antwerp, a retired lawyer living alone in Annapolis. She is the divorced mother of two adult children. She was adopted, and is unsure of whether to learn about her birth parents. She has a lifelong practice of writing letters, including to family members, work associates, and authors such as Joan Didion, Larry McMurtry, and Ann Patchett. All the while, she is gradually losing her eyesight, and there are a series of unsent letters written to an unknown recipient.

== Reception ==
The novel did not receive much attention within the first few months of publishing, but gradually gained popularity, entering the New York Times Hardcover Fiction Best Seller List on October 5, 2025. As of April 13, 2026, the novel has spent twenty-four weeks on the New York Times Hardcover Fiction Best Seller List, including eight weeks at the top of the list. It also reached the top of the Combined Print & E-Book Fiction List on February 1, 2026.

The novel won a PEN/Hemingway Award for Debut Novel, the Women's Prize for Fiction, and the inaugural James Patterson and Bookshop.org Prize. It was included on The Washington Post's list of 50 notable works of fiction from 2025, Barnes & Noble's Best Fiction of 2025 list, and Amazon's Best Books of 2025. It was nominated for a Goodreads Choice Award for Fiction, Debut Novel, and Audiobook. It was also nominated for an Audie Award for Ensemble Performance and Fiction. It was a BBC Radio 2 Book Club pick.

Ann Patchett praised the novel, calling it "really beautiful" and "a cause for celebration". Kirkus Reviews called the novel at times "thoughtful" and at other times "laugh-out-loud funny". Sarah-Ruth Tasko of Library Journal called each letter "a compelling monologue that communicates raw emotion and grief alongside humor and tart observations". Publishers Weekly called the novel "charming". Elisabeth Egan of The New York Times featured it as her favorite hidden gem book of 2025. Anne Griffin called the novel "a masterclass in how to exquisitely put words on human frailty" in her review for The Irish Times. Laura Hackett of The Times said that the novel "breathes fresh life" into the epistolary novel format and called the prose "a joy to read". Chris Hewitt of The Minnesota Star Tribune called the novel "an absolute charmer". Amazon editor Abby Abell said she "fell for Sybil immediately."

== Adaptation ==
A film adaptation produced by Lionsgate Films was announced on March 18, 2026. It will be written by Cat Vasko and will star Jane Fonda. Fonda will produce alongside Todd Lieberman, and Vasko will executive produce alongside Virginia Evans.
