= Florence Fair =

American actress (1907–1969)

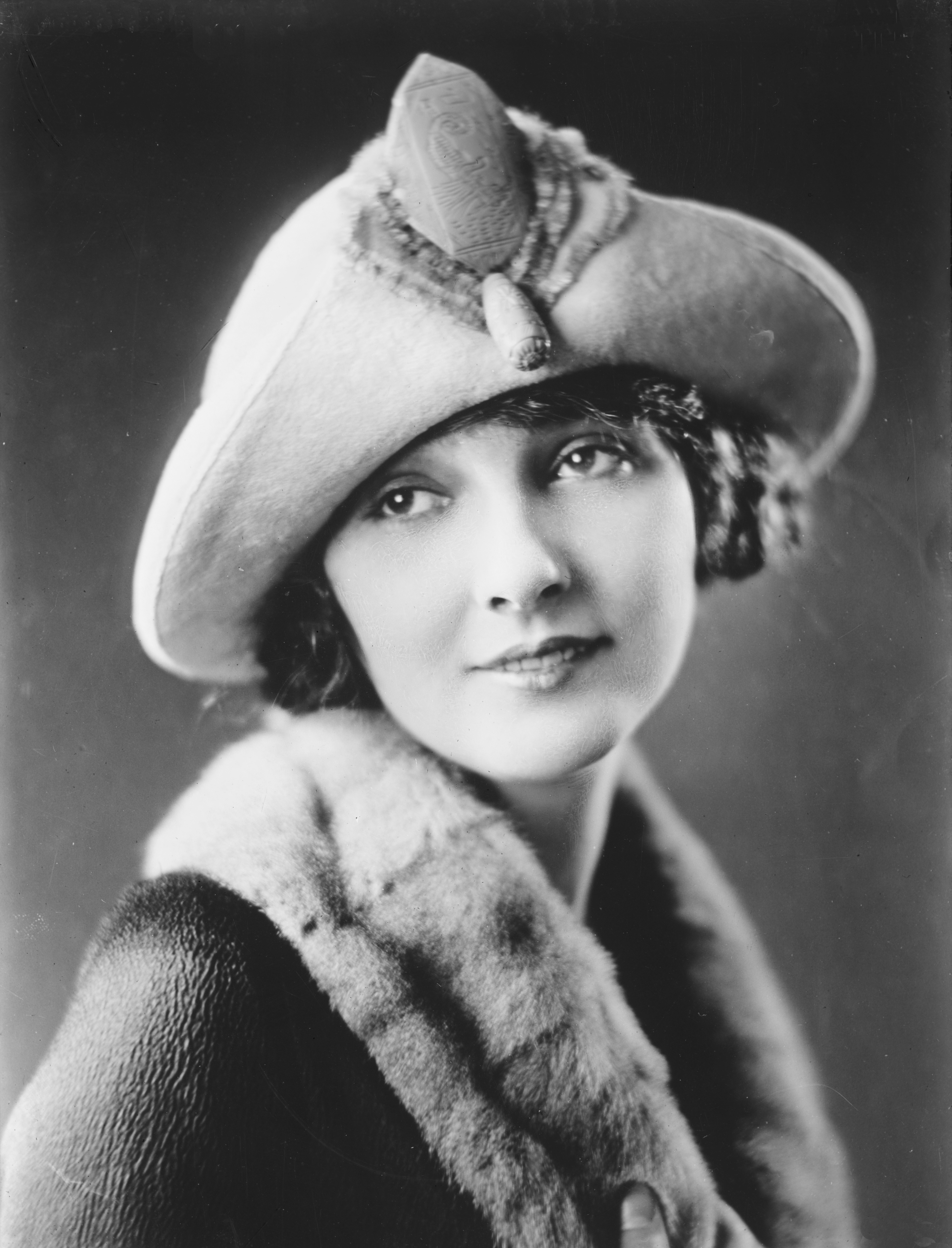
- Fair c. 1925
- Born: Flobelle Fairbanks; December 14, 1907; Salida, Colorado, U.S.
- Died: January 5, 1969 (aged 61); New York City, U.S.
- Resting place: Woodlawn Cemetery (Bronx, New York)
- Occupation: Actress
- Years active: 1918–1946
- Spouse: Shirley Burden (m. 1937)
- Children: Margaret Florence; Shirley Carter Burden, Jr.
- Relatives: Douglas Fairbanks (uncle)

Flobelle Fairbanks (December 14, 1907 – January 5, 1969), known professionally as Florence Fair, was an American actress.

== Biography ==
Fair was born as Flobelle Fairbanks in Salida, Colorado. She was the daughter of John Fairbanks and Margaret McElvain, and the niece of actor Douglas Fairbanks.

In 1936, she married photographer Shirley Burden. Together, they were the parents of two children, a daughter and a son: Margaret Florence (1936–2019) and Shirley Carter Burden Jr. (1941–1996), who was a former assistant to Senator Robert F. Kennedy, and who was married to Amanda Jay Mortimer (b. 1944) before their divorce in 1972.

Fair died on January 5, 1969. She was buried in Woodlawn Cemetery in Bronx, New York.

== Filmography ==
- Zaza (1923)
- The Moral Sinner (1924)
- Sally of the Sawdust (1925)
- Eyes Right! (1926) credited as Flobelle Fairbanks
- The Love of Sunya (1927)
- The Climbers (1927)
- What Happened to Father (1927)
- The Firebird (1934)
- Gentlemen Are Born (1934)
- I Am a Thief (1934)
- The Secret Bride (1934)
- Gold Diggers of 1935 (1935)
- The Florentine Dagger (1935)
- Dinky (1935)
- In Caliente (1935)
- Oil for the Lamps of China (1935)
- Stranded (1935)
- Front Page Woman (1935)
- Don't Bet on Blondes (1935)
- Page Miss Glory (1935)
- The Case of the Lucky Legs (1935)
- Personal Maid's Secret (1935)
- Stars Over Broadway (1935)
- Man of Iron (1935)
- Captain Blood (1935)
- Dangerous (1935)
- Freshman Love (1936)
- The Story of Louis Pasteur (1936)
- Murder by an Aristocrat (1936)
- Hearts Divided (1936)
- Second Wife (1936)
- Undercurrent (1946)
