= Urban Land Institute =

International nonprofit organization

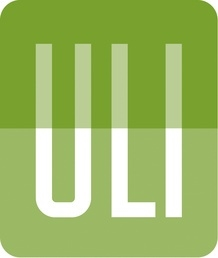
- The Official Urban Land Institute logo
- Abbreviation: ULI
- Formation: 1936; 90 years ago
- Type: Land use think tank and research institute
- Headquarters: 2001 L Street NW
- Location: Washington, D.C.
- Key people: Franz Colloredo-Mansfeld, Global Chair; Angela Cain, Global CEO
- Website: uli.org

The Urban Land Institute, or ULI, is a global nonprofit research and education organization with regional offices in Washington, D.C., Hong Kong, and London. ULI aims to help its members and their partners build more equitable, sustainable, healthy and resilient communities.

ULI was founded in 1936 and currently has more than 48,000 members. About 28 percent of ULI members are real estate developers, 10 percent are service providers such as architects and consultants, 10 percent are from the public sector, 13 percent represent sources of capital such as investors.

ULI focuses on best practices in real estate development, housing, transportation, and related topics. The Institute provides technical assistance in communities via advisory panels, hosts conferences, produces reports, collects and shares industry benchmarks and guidance, and offers learning opportunities and courses.

ULI currently has 52 District Councils or local chapters in the Americas, as well as 7 National councils in Europe and Asia. The Institute’s Product Councils are groups of senior industry leaders. District and Product Councils that facilitate learning and sharing.

The Institute is governed by a Global Board of Directors, made up of member volunteers. The board is currently headed by Global Chair Franz Colloredo-Mansfeld, chairman and CEO of Cabot Properties, appointed in July 2025 to succeed Diane Hoskins. The organization is led by Global CEO Angela Cain. Prior to Cain, the position was held by Ron Pressman, and by W. Edward Walter prior to that.

== History ==
=== 1936–1949 ===
ULI was founded during the Great Depression on December 14, 1936 as the National Real Estate Foundation for Practical Research and Education, with the intention of becoming a research and education college in real estate and "urbiculture." In 1939 the organization changed its name to the Urban Land Institute, two years after establishing its headquarters in Chicago, Illinois.

ULI held its first conference in 1941, hosted by the Massachusetts Institute of Technology in Boston. A year later, ULI established itself as an advocacy organization with the publication of "Outline for a Legislative Program to Rebuild Our Cities." That same year, the institute relocated its headquarters to Washington, DC.

In 1944, ULI's first Product Council, the Community Builder's Council, was organized focusing on suburban building issues facing post-World War II American cities. The institute's Advisory Services program was established in 1947, conducting its first panel for the city of Louisville, Kentucky.

=== 1950–1979 ===
The 1950s marked the establishment of the J.C. Nichols Foundation (which later evolved into the ULI Foundation) as well as the Institute's first shopping center costs study.

ULI continued to move towards becoming a more research-focused institution during the 1960s, establishing its first research program in 1960. The Institute would conduct a number of multiyear comparative land use studies and begin spreading their influence abroad by holding its first international meeting for sustaining members in Mexico City in 1965. In 1965, ULI held its first international meeting for sustaining members in Mexico City. Two years later, in 1967, the Community Builder's Council hosted ULI's first European study tour.

In 1970, the Urban Land Research Foundation (later called the ULI Foundation) was created to "help meet the rising need for an expanding more accessible body of development information." In 1979, ULI established the ULI Awards for Excellence program.

=== 1980–1999 ===
ULI created its regional District Council program in 1983, starting with seven councils in various U.S. cities.

UrbanPlan, the Institute's second high school program, was created with the help of a grant award from the National Geographic Society Education Foundation. In 1992, the Institute created its first two European National Councils for the cities of London and Barcelona.

The ULI Senior Resident Fellows program was established in 1996. That same year, the first ULI Mayor's Forum was held with the intention of creating a venue for city officials and the private sector to meet and seek solutions to urban problems.

=== 2000–present ===
In 2000, the ULI Prize for Visionaries in Urban Development was established and the number of ULI District Councils grew to 39, expanding to Europe, Asia, and South America as National Councils. A year later, in 2001, ULI opened its first European office in Brussels, Belgium. That same year, the first Young Leaders group was established by the ULI Houston District Council. A majority of the other District Councils have a Young Leaders group by 2005, and ULI opened its first Canadian District Council in Toronto, Ontario that same year.

The European office relocated to London and founded the Community Action Grant program in 2004. In 2007, the ULI Terwilliger Center for Housing was created in addition to the opening of a ULI office in Hong Kong. By 2008, ULI membership would exceed 40,000. That same year, ULI created the ULI Daniel Rose Center for Public Leadership in Land Use along with the launch of the Urban Investment Network in Europe. In 2011, the National Building Museum announced ULI as the 2012 Honor Award recipient for its years of dedication to leadership in urban planning and developing sustainable communities.

In 2012, ULI absorbed the Greenprint Foundation (now known as ULI Greenprint), a global alliance of real estate owners and developers which uses benchmarking and knowledge sharing to help the industry cost-effectively reduce greenhouse gas emissions.

In 2014, ULI and the National League of Cities entered a partnership to jointly guide the direction and operations of the Rose Center for Public Leadership, helping expand its work and influence to a wider audience of city officials. The partnership ended in 2019.

In 2015, ULI established the Building Healthy Places program, which focuses on intersections between health, social and racial equity and the built environment.

== Programs ==
Since the middle of the 20th century, ULI has been hired by city governments and private land owners as consultants for tackling local real estate and development problems through the advisory services program. These multidisciplinary teams - consisting of members with expertise in architecture, urban planning, transportation consulting, finance, and market trends - have had many of their recommendations adopted or implemented. The institute's local district councils, have provided events for government officials and private industry leaders to deliberate about future land use challenges and have also established an UrbanPlan classroom-based curriculum that been widely adopted by schools across the United States and Canada, and expanded globally. In addition, ULI has taken part in a number of partnerships in order to provide leadership and awareness in urban development practices, including one with the World Economic Forum (WEF).

=== Advisory services ===
ULI’s first advisory services program was held in April 1947 in Louisville, Kentucky. It brings together experienced real estate and land use professionals to develop solutions for complex land use and real estate development projects, programs, and policies. The panels have helped sponsors find solutions on topics including community revitalization, workforce and affordable housing, resilient infrastructure, and equitable access to parks. Panels have also provided expert and objective advice in the wake of natural and man-made disasters such as hurricanes, flood, infrastructure failures and tornados and acts of terrorism.

ULI panels recommended redeveloping a four-mile stretch of downtown Los Angeles into a CleanTech Corridor and its advice on how to revitalize Denver’s 16th Street Mall. ULI's panels have also offered consultant work for post-catastrophic redevelopment, including the 2007 I-35W Mississippi River bridge collapse in Minneapolis, Minnesota and advised officials on how to rebuild Lower Manhattan after the 9/11 attacks.

There has been controversy over a few of the panel's recommendations, including its 2005 post-Hurricane Katrina advice for rebuilding New Orleans.

=== UrbanPlan ===
UrbanPlan is a reality-based educational program originally created by the ULI San Francisco chapter in 2002 and now being delivered by District Councils in over 35 cities. The project based learning unit was developed in partnership with high school economics teachers, land use and real estate professionals, and the Fisher Center for Real Estate and Urban Economics (FCREUE) at the University of California at Berkeley. The core of the curriculum involves a fictitious scenario where students respond to a city request for proposals (RFP) to redevelop a 11.75 acre community. Through taking on roles and acting as developer, students learn the major issues and tradeoffs in the urban planning and redevelopment process and how the desires of many stakeholders influence development decisions. Industry experts serve as volunteers and meet with the teams twice during the building process and then again as a mock City Council to select the winning proposal. Since its launch, over 82,000 high school and university students have participated in the UrbanPlan program. In 2014, the program was introduced in the United Kingdom through a partnership with the Investment Property Forum Educational Trust. It has further expanded globally since then to other countries in Europe and to Asia Pacific. In 2015, ULI expanded the program to also deliver UrbanPlan to public officials and community members.

=== ULI Learning ===
In 1986, ULI held its first annual Real Estate School. The school offered current and aspiring real estate professionals opportunities to learn about real estate development from expert faculty in intensive, four-day courses.

In 2020, ULI and Project REAP (The Real Estate Associate Program) partnered to deliver the first ever virtual REAP Academy which aims to advance diversity, equity, and inclusion in the commercial real estate industry. The participants are involved in eight weeks of on-demand courses, live webinars, and industry panel discussions.

== Centers and Initiatives ==
=== ULI Terwilliger Center for Housing ===
The Terwilliger Center for Housing integrates ULI’s housing activities into a program of work with three objectives: to catalyze housing production, attainability, and equity; to advance best practices in housing development practice and related public policies through industry leading research; and to broaden and deepen support for housing solutions among critical stakeholders and the public. The Center is supported by a $10M gift from longtime member and former ULI chairman, J. Ronald Terwilliger.

The Terwilliger Center’s activities include developing research, publications, and other practical tools to enable housing production; engaging with members, housing industry leaders, and other critical stakeholders in housing development; a housing awards program recognizing industry best practices and innovations and effective public policies; and an annual housing conference. Research includes the annual Home Attainability Index, which is a resource for understanding the extent to which a housing market is providing a range of choices attainable to the regional workforce.

The Terwilliger Center also runs ULI’s Homeless to Housed program, an initiative to identify and implement best practices and effective solutions for addressing the needs of unhoused populations. It is funded by philanthropist and entrepreneur Preston Butcher, and was launched in Summer 2022 with the release of the research report “Homeless to Housed: The ULI Perspective Based on Actual Case Studies”. The program will help communities develop and implement strategies to address homelessness through conducting research, promoting collaboration, providing technical assistance through ULI’s network of district councils, and sharing knowledge and expertise.

=== ULI Center for Real Estate Economics and Capital Markets ===
In 2009 the institute founded the ULI Center for Capital Markets and Real Estate. The center hosts an annual capital markets and real estate conference, where it convenes industry practitioners, experts and economists. The center also publishes a semiannual Real Estate Consensus Forecast. In addition, since its founding, the center has assumed responsibility for partnering with PricewaterhouseCoopers to publish its annual Emerging Trends in Real Estate report.

Established in 2009, the Center includes and spotlights the expertise and experience of senior ULI members through one-on-one interviews and surveys.

=== ULI Randall Lewis Center for Sustainability in Real Estate ===
The Randall Lewis Center for Sustainability in Real Estate, formerly known as the ULI Center for Sustainability, was launched in 2014 to promote healthy, resilient, and energy efficient development. It houses ULI’s Building Healthy Places Initiative, the Urban Resilience program, and the Greenprint Center for Building Performance. The Building Healthy Places Initiative focuses on improving the health of people and communities in development. The ULI Urban Resilience program provides ULI members, the public, and communities across the United States with information on how to be more resilient in the face of climate change and other environmental vulnerabilities.

The ULI Randall Lewis Center for Sustainability in Real Estate, formerly known as the ULI Center for Sustainability, was launched in 2014 to promote healthy, resilient, and low-carbon development and communities. The center was renamed in January 2022 to honor real estate developer Randall Lewis after he donated $10 million to support ULI’s sustainability programs.

The Center houses ULI’s Building Healthy Places Initiative, Urban Resilience program, and Greenprint Center for Building Performance. It is leading ULI’s work to help the real estate industry achieve net zero carbon emissions by 2050.

The Building Healthy Places Initiative focuses on improving the health of people and communities. Building Healthy Places helps members take action on opportunities to enhance health and social and racial equity through their professional practice and leadership in communities.

The BHP Initiative produces at least three major reports per year. This research includes the 2022 report, Ten Principles for Embedding Racial Equity in Real Estate Development, and the 2015 report, Building Healthy Places Toolkit: Strategies for Enhancing Health in the Built Environment. Learning programs include the ULI Health Leaders Network, the Randall Lewis Mentorship program, a biannual forum series, and a book club. The Initiative helps District Councils engage on pressing land use issues, including equitable access to parks and the revitalization of commercial corridors.

The ULI Urban Resilience program is focused on how buildings and cities can be more resilience to impacts of climate change and other environmental vulnerabilities. The Urban Resilience program works with ULI members to provide technical assistance, advance knowledge through research, and catalyze the adoption of transformative practices for real estate and land use policy.

Resilience research includes the 2018 report 10 Principles for Building Resilience, a series of Climate Risk and Real Estate, as well as numerous project profiles in the Developing Urban Resilience collection. Additional member engagement is through the ULI Resilience Summit, Resilient Cities Summit, resilience ULI Learning courses and resilience ULI Awards.

=== ULI Greenprint Center for Building Performance ===
In 2012 the Greenprint Foundation transferred their activities and assets to ULI, creating the ULI Greenprint Center for Building Performance. With the merger, the new entity hopes to facilitate the reduced use of greenhouse gas emissions in the global real estate industry. The center is best known for its annual Greenprint Performance Report, a tool used by the center's members to assess their own relative progress in reducing emissions. The report uses the Greenprint Carbon Index, and is intended to provide a verifiable, transparency tool for building owners to use in benchmarking their portfolios. The center's membership has included companies such as AvalonBay; GE Capital Real Estate; GLL Real Estate Partners; Grosvenor; Hines; Jones Lang LaSalle; Prologis; Prudential Real Estate Investors; and TIAA-CREF.

== Awards and competitions ==
The organization makes several awards annually, including the ULI Awards for Excellence, the ULI Hines Student Competition, the ULI Prize for Visionaries in Urban Development, the Jack Kemp Excellence in Affordable and Workforce Housing Awards, and the ULI Placemaking Award.

=== ULI Prize for Visionaries in Urban Development ===
The ULI Prize for Visionaries in Urban Development is an annual award given to an individual (or an institution's representative) who has made a most distinguished contribution to community building globally, who has established visionary standards of excellence in the land use and development field, and whose commitment to creating the highest quality built environment has led to the betterment of our society. The prize was initially established as the J.C. Nichols Prize in 2000, by a gift of the family of influential 20th century land developer, Jesse Clyde Nichols of Kansas City, Missouri. In 2020, the prize was renamed as the ULI Prize for Visionaries in Urban Development.

Winners receive a $100,000 prize, which continues to be funded through an endowment from the Nichols family to the ULI Foundation from the Miller Nichols Living Trust and the Miller Nichols Charitable Foundation. Past winners of the ULI Prize for Visionaries in Urban Development include Mayor Richard M. Daley, Amanda Burden, Peter Calthorpe, and Vincent Scully, His Highness the Aga Khan, Gerald D. Hines, Robin Chase, Theaster Gates, Alejandro Aravena, and Anthony Williams, Jeanne Gang,Mayor Anne Hidalgo, Dr. Robert D. Bullard, and Carol Coletta.

=== ULI Awards for Excellence ===
Founded in 1979, the ULI Awards for Excellence recognizes truly superior development efforts in the private, public, and nonprofit sectors. Winning projects represent the highest standards of achievement in the development industry - standards that ULI members deem worthy of attainment in their professional endeavors. The Awards for Excellence recognize the full development process of a project, not just its architecture or design - although these elements play an important role. A jury of ULI members chooses finalists and winners.The ULI Awards for Excellence runs in three regions, the Americas, Europe, and Asia Pacific.

=== ULI Urban Open Space Award ===
The ULI Urban Open Space Award recognizes a few outstanding examples of urban public open space that have both enriched the local character and revitalized their surrounding community. The award program was established in 2009, after that year's ULI Prize for Visionaries in Urban Development winner, Amanda Burden, donated her $100,000 prize back to ULI for the creation of the Award. Detroit’s Campus Martius Park was the inaugural winner of the Award, receiving a $10,000 cash prize.

=== ULI Jack Kemp Excellence in Affordable and Workforce Housing Award ===
The ULI Jack Kemp Excellence in Affordable and Workforce Housing Award honors developers who demonstrate both leadership and creativity in expanding the availability of workforce housing in the United States. The awards program was established by the ULI Terwilliger Center in 2008 under the original name, the ULI/J. Ronald Terwilliger Workforce Housing Models of Excellence Awards. It was later renamed in tribute to Jack Kemp.

Each year, the ULI Terwilliger Center for Housing highlights the efforts of leaders across the country working to expand housing opportunity. The Center recognizes three awards. The Robert C. Larson Housing Policy Leadership Award recognizes innovative state and local policy initiatives that support the creation and preservation of affordable and workforce housing. The Jack Kemp Excellence in Affordable and Workforce Housing Award and Terwilliger Center Award for Innovation in Attainable Housing honor developments that expand housing opportunities in their communities.

=== ULI Hines Student Competition ===
The ULI/Gerald D. Hines Student Urban Design Competition, or ULI Hines Student Competition, held its first cycle in 2003. The program provides graduate-level (or fourth-year undergraduate level) students the opportunity to compete for a $35,000 prize. Each year, a real, large-scale site in a North American city is selected. Students form multidisciplinary teams and then have two weeks to craft a comprehensive design and development plan for that site, and a jury panel of ULI members selects a winning team.

The ULI Hines Student Competition is open to students from around the world. They also held a separate inaugural process for students in Europe in 2020 for the ULI Hines Student Competition - Europe. In 2022, the competition launched a call for entries in the Asia Pacific region for the ULI Hines Student Competition - Asia Pacific.

== Publications ==
=== Magazines ===
- Urban Land
- Multifamily Trends
- Urban Land Green

=== Books ===
- Mistakes We Have Made in Community Development (1945)
- The Community Builders Handbook (1947)
- The City Fights Back (1954)
- The Dollars & Cents of Shopping Centers series (1961)
- The Homes Association Handbook (1964)
- Professional Real Estate Development: The ULI Guide to Business (2003)
- Real Estate Development: Principles and Process (2007)
- Growing Cooler (2008)
- Retail Development (2008)
- Real Estate Market Analysis: Methods and Case Studies (2009)
- ULI UK Residential Council's Build to Rent: A Best Practice Guide (2014)
- Building for Wellness (2014)
- Real Estate Development: Principles and Process: Fifth Edition (2015)
- Successful Public/Private Partnerships (2016)
- Building Equitable Cities (2018)
- Building Small (2019)
- Real Estate Market Analysis (2019)
- Building Multimodal Future (2019)
- Finance for Real Estate Development (2019)
- Shared Parking (2020)
- Making It In Real Estate (2020)
- Professional Real Estate Development: Fourth Edition(2022)

=== Reports ===
- Emerging Trends in Real Estate (annual real estate forecast)
- Infrastructure report
- Global Sustainability Outlook (annual publication)
- State of Green: Greenprint Performance Report (annual benchmark publication)
- Building Healthy Places Toolkit: Strategies for Enhancing Health in the Built Environment (2015)
- 10 Principles for Embedding Racial Equity in Real Estate (2022)
- The Pandemic and the Public Realm (2021)

== Organization & Events ==
ULI is a 501(c)(3) not-for-profit organization governed by a set of bylaws. According to ULI's website, the organization is led by staff and member volunteers, while its business and operations are under the direction of its global chairman, chief executive officer, trustees, board of directors, and an operating committee.

=== District and National Councils ===
Since ULI is a global organization with members geographically located in various regions, major cities, and metropolitan areas, the organization provides forums at the local level. ULI refers to its local chapters as national and district councils. The local district councils host networking events, conferences, technical advisory panels, and awards programs for the area's members. These are cadres of ULI members, capped at 50 members each, where council members participate in closed-door information exchanges and the sharing of best practices in their specialized industry.

=== Convenings ===
Each year, ULI holds a number of industry events open to both members and non-members. Four global major annual ULI events are the Spring and Fall Meetings, ULI Europe Conference, and the ULI Asia Pacific Summit, they are held in various host cities across North America and Europe and APAC regions. Notable past ULI keynote speakers include former President Bill Clinton, former President George W. Bush, JPMorgan Chase CEO Jamie Dimon, actor Robert Redford, NBA Hall of Famer Magic Johnson, and former U.S. Federal Reserve chairman Paul Volcker, global co-head of Blackstone Real Estate Kathleen McCarthy, and President of Eurasia group Ian Bremmer.

Outside of North America, ULI’s global events include the annual ULI Europe Conference, and the ULI Asia Pacific Summit.

== See also ==
- Real estate development
- urban planning
- green development
- commercial real estate
- economic development
