= Theo of Golden =

2025 novel by Allen Levi

- Author: Allen Levi
- Publisher: Atria Books (2025 edition)
- Publication date: October 3, 2025
- ISBN: 9781668236512

Theo of Golden is a novel by American author Allen Levi. It was first self-published in 2023 and later republished by Atria Books, an imprint of Simon & Schuster, in 2025. The novel later appeared on The New York Times Best Seller list.

== Plot ==
An elderly, wealthy Portuguese widower named Theo (actually Gamez Theophilus Silva, a globally reclusive master artist known as Zila) arrives in the small southern town of Golden, Georgia, where he becomes captivated by 92 realistic pencil portraits of local residents drawn by a young local artist named Asher Glissen hanging on the wall of a coffee shop called The Chalice. Settling into an apartment with the help of landlord James Ponder and assistant Mrs. Gidley, Theo quietly buys up all the portraits and embarks on a personal mission to track down and gift them back to each subject—including a regretful mother named Minnette, a cynical bookstore owner named Tony, a night-shift custodian named Kendrick whose daughter he secretly pays to have surgery, a struggling street musician named Basil, and a homeless woman named Ellen whom he helps build an art business. After spending a year deeply transforming the community through profound acts of empathy and mentoring Asher, Theo tragically dies from a fall off his balcony while trying to protect Ellen from an attack, after which a New York newspaper and a final letter reveal that Theo was not only the famous Zila, but also Asher’s biological father who had come to Golden just to know and love his son.

== Reception ==
Levi initially self-published the novel in 2023, where it gained attention through word-of-mouth promotion. In 2025, it was acquired by Atria Books for wider distribution.

The novel has been described as a “word-of-mouth smash hit” by The New York Times.

In August 2026, it was announced that Warner Bros. was negotiating the rights for a film based on the novel, to star Tom Hanks.
