= Carter Burden =

American politician (1941–1996)

Member of New York City Council
- In office January 1, 1970 – December 31, 1977
- Preceded by: Robert A. Low
- Succeeded by: Jane B. Trichter
- Constituency: 4th district (1970–73); 7th district (1974–77)

Personal details
- Born: Shirley Carter Burden Jr. August 25, 1941 Beverly Hills, California, U.S.
- Died: January 23, 1996 (aged 54) New York City, U.S.
- Party: Democratic
- Spouses: Amanda Burden (m. 1964; div. 1972) Susan Lombaer (m. 1977)
- Relations: Shirley Burden (father)
- Education: Harvard University (BA); Columbia Law School (LLB)

Shirley Carter Burden Jr. (August 25, 1941 – January 23, 1996) was an American politician who served in the New York City Council from 1970 to 1977.

== Early life and education ==
Burden was born in 1941 to Shirley Burden and Florence Fair. He received his B.A. from Harvard University and his LL.B. from Columbia Law School.

== Political career ==
Burden served three terms on the New York City Council from 1970 to 1977, representing the 4th district from 1970 to 1973 and the 7th district from 1974 to 1977. During his tenure, he chaired the health committee and focused on progressive legislation, and introduced initiatives to combat lead-based paint poisoning in children, improve health and housing conditions for elderly residents, and establish prisoners' rights standards. He also introduced early legislation on gay rights.

== Other work ==
Burden was one of many owners of The Village Voice.

He founded The Carter Burden Center for the Aging (later The Carter Burden Network) to assist older residents of the Upper East Side (the area he represented on the City Council) in 1971.

== Personal life ==
Burden was a great-great-great-grandson of Commodore Cornelius Vanderbilt and a great-nephew of actor Douglas Fairbanks Sr.

In 1964, he married Amanda Burden, the daughter of Babe Paley; they divorced in 1972. They had two children before divorcing, including lawyer and author Belle Burden. He married Susan Lombaer in 1977.

Burden was a collector of paintings, drawings, and sculpture. His collection included works by Jackson Pollock, Mark Rothko, Willem de Kooning, Jasper Johns, Francis Bacon, Franz Kline, Andy Warhol, Roy Lichtenstein, and Frank Stella, among others. His drawing collection included works by Henri Matisse, Egon Schiele, Gustav Klimt, Henry Moore, and David Hockney. He also assembled a collection of first editions of 20th-century American authors, including F. Scott Fitzgerald, William Faulkner, and Ernest Hemingway, that was regarded as one of the finest in the world.

Burden died on January 23, 1996, in Manhattan, New York City, at age 54.
