= Dora Dean =

American vaudeville dancer and entertainer

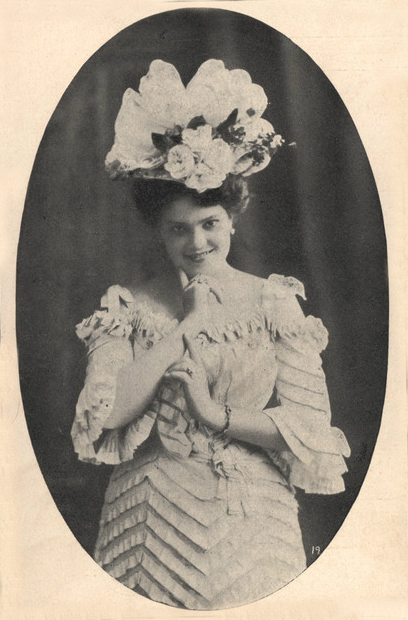
- Dora Dean taken from the sheet music cover of Don't Think You'd Like to Fondle Me by Hughie Cannon, c. 1900.
- Born: Dora Babbige; 1872; Cloverport, Kentucky, U.S.
- Died: December 13, 1949 (aged 76–77); Minneapolis, Minnesota, U.S.
- Occupation: Vaudeville
- Known for: Dancing and Choreographing

Dora Dean (born Dora Babbige; c. 1872 – December 13, 1949) was an African-American vaudeville dancer and entertainer. She was part of one of the most popular vaudeville acts of the pre-World War I period. She was best known for popularizing the cakewalk dance internationally, with her husband and dance partner Charles E. Johnson, as part of the act Dean and Johnson.

== Early years ==
Dean was born in Cloverport, Kentucky. (Another source gives Covington, Kentucky, as her place of birth.) She worked as a nursemaid in Cincinnati, Ohio, before becoming an entertainer.

== Career ==
Dean debuted as a dancer with a Creole traveling show. In vaudeville, she was known as "The Black Venus".

Early in their time as a team, Johnson and Dean decided to avoid Uncle Tom-style humor. Instead, they went for a higher level of performances. As they were able, they bought costumes and jewelry to enhance the act's look. They are identified with several firsts. They were the first African American couple to perform on Broadway, the first to use strobe lighting, and the first to use steel taps on their shoes.

The couple moved to Europe in 1903 and began performing most of the time there, with occasional trips to Australia and the United States for performances. In 1902, they performed in London's Palace Theatre for King Edward VII.

Johnson and Dean ended their act in 1914 to pursue individual careers. She appeared in the film Georgia Rose (1930). After 20 years, they reunited at a time when vaudeville was dying.

== Legacy ==
Dean's beauty inspired a number of songs, including "Dora Dean The Sweetest Gal You Ever Seen" (1896) by performer and composer Bert Williams and "Dora Dean's Sister" (1902) by Joseph F. Lamb.

In 1898, "Dora Dean The Sweetest Gal You Ever Seen" was the subject of a lawsuit in which a San Francisco judge ruled that the song could not be protected by copyright with the original lyrics "... the hottest thing you ever seen ..." because "the word 'hottest' as used in this case has an indelicate and vulgar meaning ..."

In 1946, radio game show host John Reed King stumped his studio audience with the question "Who is Dora Dean?" A refrigerator, bedroom suite, silverware set, and $100 went unclaimed as no one provided the correct answer.

== Later years and death ==
Johnson and Dean reunited (professionally and personally) in 1934 and retired by 1942. They lived in Minneapolis in their later years. Dean died in Minneapolis in 1949.
