= Amanda Burden =

American urban planner

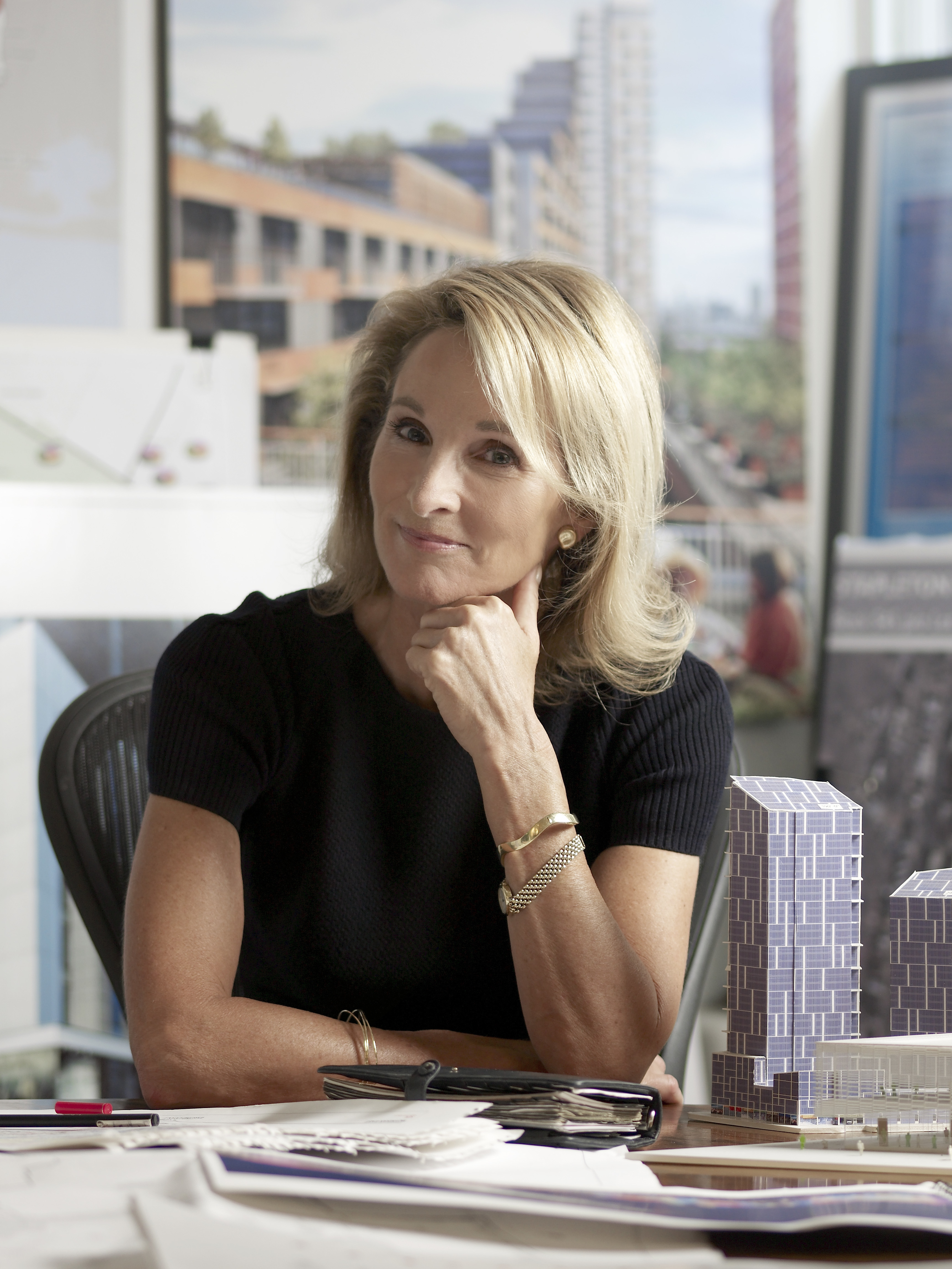
- Burden in 2008
- Born: Amanda Jay Mortimer; 1944 or 1945 (age 81–82); New York City, U.S.
- Education: Sarah Lawrence College (BA); Columbia University (MUP)
- Occupations: Urban planner, consultant
- Spouses: Shirley Carter Burden Jr. (m. 1964; div. 1972) Steven J. Ross (m. 1979; div. 1981)
- Partner(s): Charlie Rose (1993–2006)
- Children: 2, including Belle Burden
- Parents: Stanley Grafton Mortimer Jr.; Babe Paley

Amanda Jay Mortimer Burden (née Mortimer) is an American urban planner who is a Principal at Bloomberg Associates, an international consulting service founded by Michael Bloomberg as a philanthropic venture to help city governments improve the quality of lives of their citizens. She was the Director of the New York City Department of City Planning and Chair of the City Planning Commission under Mayor Bloomberg from 2002 to 2013.

Burden previously worked for the New York State Urban Development Corporation. She worked on Battery Park City from 1983 to 1990. She is also a member of the International Best Dressed List since 1996.

== Early life and education ==
Burden was born in New York City, the daughter of socialite Babe Paley and her first husband, Stanley G. Mortimer Jr. (1913–1999), an heir to the Standard Oil fortune. She is a descendant of the first chief justice of the U.S. Supreme Court, John Jay, and a granddaughter of Dr. Harvey Cushing, the "Father of American Neurosurgery" and Pulitzer Prize-winning author. In 1947, her mother married William S. Paley, the son of a successful immigrant cigar entrepreneur who built a family acquisition into CBS. Her stepmother, Kathleen Harriman Mortimer, was a daughter of railroad heir and United States ambassador W. Averell Harriman.

She graduated from the Westover School in Middlebury, Connecticut and attended Wellesley College until her marriage in 1964. She graduated from Sarah Lawrence College in 1976, with a concentration in environmental science. She later earned a Master of Urban Planning from Columbia University, writing an award-winning thesis about solid-waste management.

== Career ==
Burden was a public school teaching aide in Harlem in the 1960s.

Burden worked with the architecture firm Gruzen & Partners and one of her mentors was William H. Whyte, the urbanologist, with whom she worked on his Project for Public Spaces.

From 1983 until 1990, Burden was Vice President for Planning and Design of the Battery Park City Authority. She was responsible for the development and implementation of design guidelines for the 92-acre (370,000 m^{2}) site as well as for overseeing the design of all open spaces and parkland, including the waterfront esplanade. Among her other New York projects are the Midtown Community Court and the Red Hook Community Justice Center, which provides integrated legal, economic and social services.

Starting in 1990, Burden served on the New York City Planning Commission, when she was appointed by New York City Council president Andrew Stein. She served as Commissioner from 2002 to 2013 under Mayor Bloomberg.

=== New York City Planning Commission ===
Burden served as Chair of the New York City Planning Commission and Director of the Department of City Planning from 2002 to 2013 under Mayor Michael Bloomberg. During her tenure, the department rezoned almost 40% of the city. The department helped to create the East River Esplanade, transform the High Line into High Line Park, and develop the Brooklyn Waterfront and Hudson Yards. The Bloomberg administration also launched a "comprehensive waterfront plan known as Vision 2020", which would increase access to the water for kayakers and canoeists and address climate change. Burden said the goal of the initiative was for the water to become the "sixth borough" of the city. "The water should become a part of our everyday lives", she declared.

In her term, Burden sought to combine the large transformative change of Robert Moses with a neighborhood-sensitive ethic inspired by Jane Jacobs, writing in 2006, "Big projects are a necessary part of the diversity, competition and growth that both Jacobs and Moses fought for. But today's big projects must have a human scale; must be designed, from idea to construction, to fit into the city. Projects may fail to live up to Jane Jacob's standards, but they are still judged by her rules."

As stated in a New York Times story in 2012: "Ms. Burden, who spends her leisure time walking the city, boating or birding, argues that 'good design is good economic development, and I know this is true.' She unabashedly calls the administration 'pro-development,' and points to the High Line, which the city says has generated $2 billion in private investment in the area and has created 12,000 jobs. 'What I have tried to do, and think I have done,' she said, 'is create value for these developers, every single day of my term.'" Describing the administration's approach to development, Burden said, "Improvement of neighborhoods — some people call it gentrification — provides more jobs, provides housing, much of it affordable, and private investment, which is tax revenue for the city."

Burden also focused on managing the aesthetics of new development in a way that maintains the character of a neighborhood. "We have tried to diagnose the DNA of each neighborhood", she said. "I have spent a lot of time in the streets, talking to communities." She emphasized public features like "open space, continuous shop fronts, and the inclusion of trees and other elements that foster lively street life." Because of Burden's contextual zoning, which required new development to fit in with the height and style of nearby structures, some developers were forced to restrain and redesign proposals, like 53W53, which was reduced by 200 feet.

The Regional Plan Association argued Burden's control over the aesthetics of development led to "profoundly conservative building" and a "local zeitgeist [that] has switched from big and bold to keeping everything small, nondescript and similar to everything else in the neighborhood." According to Eliot Brown in The New York Observer, "Ms. Burden is an increasingly powerful and apparently emboldened force in the Bloomberg administration—one whose often forceful views are imprinted and emblazoned on nearly every major skyscraper, mall, public plaza and large development that rises in city limits."

Despite a focus on increased development and intent to respect the wishes and diversity of neighborhoods, the increase in housing supply, density and major zoning changes had not translated into affordable rents or homes. Burden herself acknowledged the failure to address the price of housing when speaking in 2013 at a CityLab panel on urban expansion:

What we haven't figured out is the question of gentrification. I have never, since I had this job, come up with a satisfactory answer of how to make sure everyone benefits ... I had believed that if we kept building in that manner and increasing our housing supply ... that prices would go down. We had every year almost 30,000 permits for housing, and we built a tremendous amount of housing, including affordable housing, either through incentives or through government funds. And the price of housing didn't go down at all. That's a practitioner's point of view.

=== Honors ===
In 1966, Burden was named to the Best Dressed List of the New York Couture Group.

In 2005, Pratt Institute awarded Burden an Honorary Doctorate in Public Administration, and the New York Chapter of the American Institute of Architects presented her with its 2005 Center for Architecture Award. The Smithsonian Cooper-Hewitt National Design Museum presented her with its 2004 Design Patron Award. In 2008, Burden was inducted into the membership of the American Institute of Certified Planners (AICP) College of Fellows, and was named the 5th most powerful person in New York real estate by The New York Observer.

In 2009, Burden received the Urban Land Institute's J.C. Nichols Prize for Visionaries in Urban Development. Burden announced that she would donate the accompanying $100,000 award to ULI to create a yearly award honoring significant public spaces around the world.

In 2011, Burden received the American Architectural Foundation Keystone Award, which recognizes leadership in design by individuals from outside the architectural discipline.

In 2012, the Architectural League of New York granted Burden the President's Medal.

Columbia University awarded Burden an Honorary Doctorate in Law in 2016.

== Personal life ==
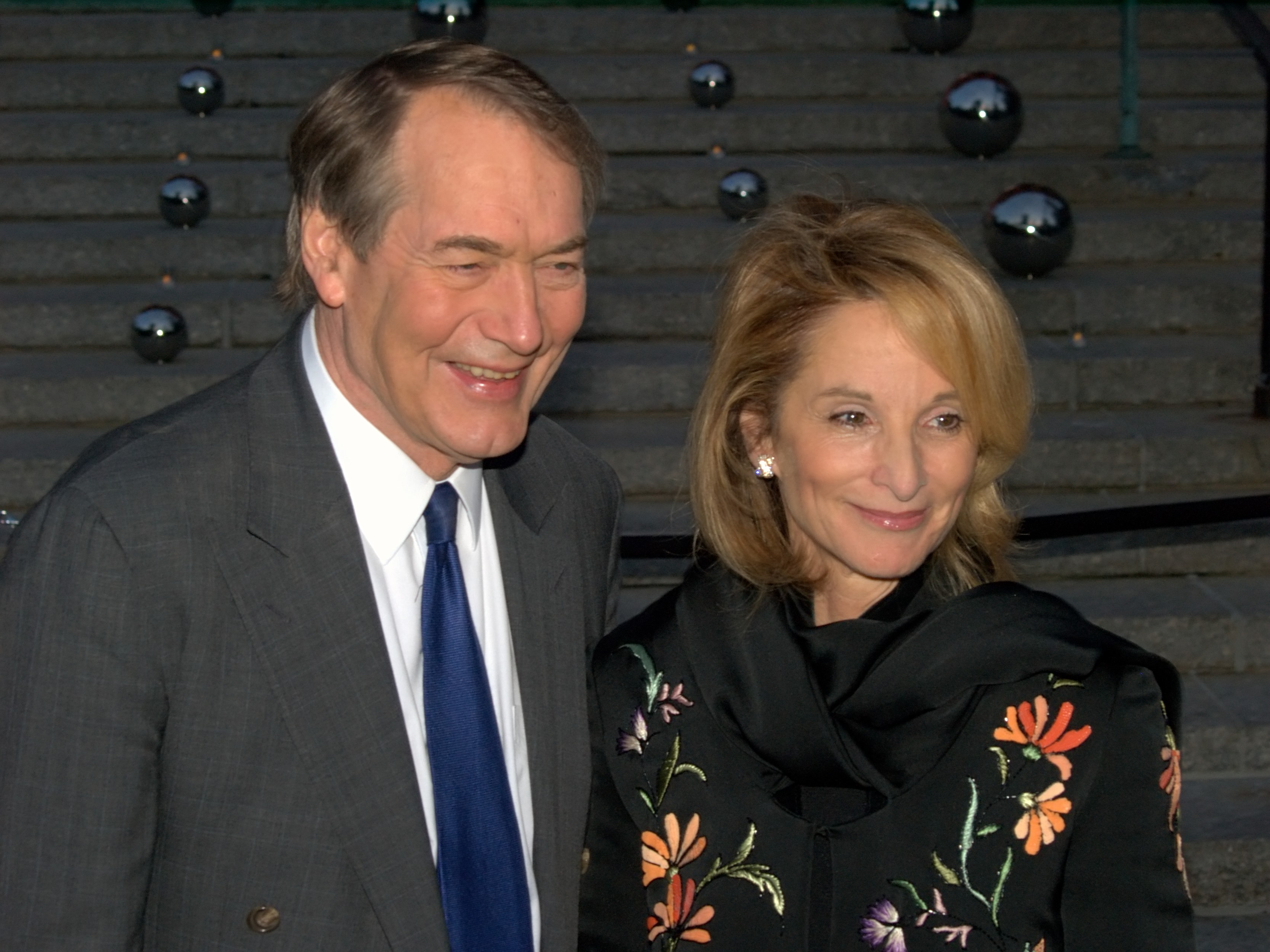
Burden with Charlie Rose in 2010

Burden has been married twice. Her first husband was Shirley Carter Burden Jr. (1941–1996). An owner of The Village Voice and New York magazine and later a New York City councilman, he worked as an aide to Sen. Robert Kennedy in the 1960s. Through him, Burden became interested in social justice and pursued a teaching career. They had two children before divorcing in 1972, including lawyer and author Belle Burden.

Her second husband was Steven J. Ross (1927–1992), the head of Warner Communications; they married in 1979 and divorced in 1981.

Burden had a relationship with journalist and talk show host Charlie Rose from 1993 to about 2006.
