= Virginia Evans =

American novelist (born 1986)

- Born: June 2, 1986 (age 40); South Carolina, U.S.
- Education: James Madison University; Trinity College Dublin
- Occupation: Author
- Writing career
- Genre: Epistolary novel
- Notable work: The Correspondent
- Notable awards: Women's Prize for Fiction
- Website: www.virginiaevansauthor.com

Virginia Evans (born on June 2, 1986) is an American novelist. She won the 2026 Women's Prize for Fiction with her novel The Correspondent.

== Early life and education ==
Evans was born in South Carolina in 1986. Her family moved to Severna Park, Maryland, in the early 1990s, when she was in elementary school, where she would live most of her childhood. Her father managed retirement communities, while her mother was an event planner for a catering company.

She received a bachelor's degree in English literature from James Madison University. There she met her husband, Mark Evans. In 2019, she and her family moved from the United States to Dublin so that she could pursue a master's degree in creative writing from Trinity College Dublin. She started writing The Correspondent after returning to the United States. She lives in Winston-Salem, North Carolina, with her husband and their two children.

Before The Correspondent, Evans wrote seven unsuccessful books over 18 years, completing her first when she was 19. She wrote a self-published novel in 2019. While working on her novels, she ran the Rotary Club in her city for seven years, she was the scheduler for an orthopedic surgeon for a few years, she worked for a bankruptcy lawyer for a year, and was a barista.

== Works ==
- Evans, Virginia (April 29, 2025). The Correspondent. New York: Random House. ISBN 978-0-593-79843-0.

By December 2025, The Correspondent had sold 550,000 copies and was on The New York Times best-seller list. The novel went on to win the 2026 Women's Prize for Fiction.
