= Deaths in May 2026 =

The following is a list of notable deaths in May 2026.

Entries for each day are listed alphabetically by surname. A typical entry lists information in the following sequence:

- Name, age, country of citizenship at birth, subsequent country of citizenship (if applicable), reason for notability, cause of death (if known), and reference.

== May 2026 ==
=== 1 ===
- Farhan Hassan Al-Mansour, Syrian Shia cleric, injuries sustained during an explosion.
- Antonio Arcari, 72, Italian Roman Catholic prelate, apostolic nuncio to four nunciatures including Mozambique (2008–2014), Costa Rica (2014–2019) and Monaco (2019–2023).
- Vladimir Bayunov, 73, Russian politician, MP (1993–1999).
- Péter Bikár, 81, Hungarian Olympic ice hockey player (1964).
- G. Robert Blakey, 90, American attorney, drafter of the RICO act.
- Panayot Butchvarov, 93, Bulgarian philosopher.
- Juliet Winters Carpenter, 77, American translator.
- Yevgeniy Duleyev, 70, Russian rower, Olympic silver medallist (1976).
- Howard Fields, 86, American neuroscientist, complications from prostate cancer.
- René Henry Gracida, 102, American Roman Catholic prelate, bishop of Corpus Christi (1983–1997) and Pensacola–Tallahassee (1975–1983).
- Stephen Greene, 81, Irish hurler (Mount Sion, Waterford).
- Alfredrick Hughes, 63, American basketball player (Loyola Chicago Ramblers, San Antonio Spurs).
- Greg Hyman, 78, American inventor, co-creator of Tickle Me Elmo.
- Philippe Lazar, 90, French statistician and epidemiologist, president of Inserm (1982–1996), president of the Research Institute for Development (1997–2001).
- Mikhail Menshikov, 78, Russian-British mathematician.
- Danny Mixon, 76, American jazz pianist, prostate cancer.
- Karl-Heinz Mühe, 77, German politician, member of the Landtag of Lower Saxony (1986–2003).
- Stephen Owen, 79, American sinologist.
- Tülay Özer, 79, Turkish singer.
- René Paardekooper, 39, Dutch footballer (Helmond Sport), complications from Hodgkin lymphoma.
- Hans-Wilhelm Pesch, 88, German politician, MP (1983–1998).
- Man Phatnothai, 85, Thai politician, minister of information and communication technology (2008), deputy prime minister (2008).
- Michael Sollis, 40, Australian musician and artistic director, bowel cancer.
- William W. Stinson, 92, Canadian railway executive, president of the Canadian Pacific Railway Limited (1981–1996).
- Csaba Takács, 71, Hungarian-Romanian politician, deputy (1990–1994).
- Dionysis Tsamis, 74, Greek footballer (Panetolikos, AEK Athens, national team).
- Françoise Wilhelmi de Toledo, 73, Swiss physician and advocate for therapeutic fasting.
- Charlie Williams, 82, Maltese footballer (Valletta, Rochester Lancers, national team).
- Alex Zanardi, 59, Italian racing driver and paracyclist, Paralympic champion (2012, 2016).

=== 2 ===
- Roque Avallay, 80, Argentine footballer (Newell's Old Boys, Huracán, national team).
- Ubaldo Biordi, 87, Sammarinese politician, captain regent (1981–1982, 1985–1986).
- Castell V. Bryant, 88, American academic administrator, president of Florida A&M University (2005–2007).
- Yaya Ceesay, 88–89, Gambian politician, MP (1960–1994).
- José María Cruz Novillo, 89, Spanish painter, designer and sculptor.
- Michel Debost, 92, French flutist.
- Chet Dobis, 83, American politician, member of the Indiana House of Representatives (1970–2012).
- Bob Dugan, 85, American football player (Toronto Argonauts).
- Doris F. Fisher, 94, American businesswoman (Gap Inc.).
- Emily Grosholz, 75, American poet.
- David Kendall, 68, American television writer, producer, (Boy Meets World, Growing Pains) and film director (Dirty Deeds).
- James Lawrence King, 98, American jurist, judge (since 1970) and chief judge (1984–1991) of the U.S. District Court for the Southern District of Florida.
- Bevis Longstreth, 92, American lawyer.
- Linda Kuk, 71–72, Hong Kong film producer (Devoted to You, Legacy of Rage, Treasure Hunt).
- Norman Lacy, 84, Australian politician, Victoria MP (1973–1982) and minister for the arts (1979–1982).
- John MacDonald, 88, British army major general and rugby union player (London Scottish, Scotland national team).
- Branko Marušič, 88, Slovenian historian.
- Peter R. Moody Jr., 82, American political scientist and sinologist.
- Ben Morea, 84, American artist and anarchist activist.
- Roberto Oviedo, 66, Argentine Olympic boxer.
- Raimundo Rodrigues Pereira, 85, Brazilian journalist.
- Dame Shirley Porter, 95, British politician, leader of the Westminster City Council (1983–1991) and lord mayor of Westminster (1991–1992).
- Kay Saunders, 78, Australian historian.
- Donald Sidney-Fryer, 91, American poet, critic and literary historian, bone cancer.
- Dominique Soltner, 89, French agronomic engineer.
- Moslem Uddin, 87, Bangladeshi politician, MP (1986–2024).
- Boris Volodin, 94, Russian politician, member of the Soviet of the Union (1984–1989).
- Finn Wagle, 84, Norwegian Church of Norway clergyman, bishop of Nidaros (1991–2008).
- Martin C. Weisskopf, 84, American space scientist.
- Colin H. Williams, 75, Welsh academic.
- Soheir Zaki, 81, Egyptian belly dancer and actress (Cairo 30).

=== 3 ===
- Jean Alambre, 79, French author and songwriter.
- Babulal Bairwa, 72, Indian politician, Rajasthan MLA (1980–1990, 2008–2013, 2018–2023), complications from diabetes.
- Régis Barroso, 84, Brazilian politician, deputy (1967–1971).
- Chris Butler, 75, British politician.
- Leslie Campbell, 67, Jamaican politician, MP (2016–2020).
- Peter Cannon-Brookes, 87, British art historian.
- Charles W. Curtis, 99, American mathematician and historian.
- Abdusamad Durmonov, 60, Uzbekistani footballer (Neftchi Fergana, Surkhon, national team).
- Stephan A. Hoeller, 94, Hungarian-born American writer.
- Alain Marchadour, 88, French Roman Catholic priest and exegetist.
- Nelson Martínez Rust, 81, Venezuelan Roman Catholic prelate, auxiliary bishop of Valencia in Venezuela (1982–1992) and bishop of San Felipe (1992–2016).
- Claire Maurier, 97, French actress (La Cage aux Folles, Amélie, A Bad Son).
- William Daniel Mayer, 84, American politician, member of the Maryland House of Delegates (2005–2007).
- Michel Merlet, 86, French composer and pedagogue.
- Józef Michalik, 85, Polish Roman Catholic prelate, archbishop of Przemyśl (1993–2016), bishop of Zielona Góra–Gorzów (1986–1993) and president of the PEC (2004–2014).
- Cândido Mota, 82, Portuguese radio announcer, television presenter and actor.
- Krzysztof Pawłowski, 79, Polish politician, senator (1989–1993).
- Jean Raquin, 90, French politician, member (1994–2015) and president (2008–2011) of the General Council of Jura.
- Paul Schwartz, 86, Romanian Jewish community leader.
- Hany Shaker, 73, Egyptian singer, actor (Sayed Darwish) and composer.
- Geoff Stedman, 83, New Zealand physicist, Hector Medal (1994), Fellow of the Royal Society of New Zealand (since 1989).
- Lee Allen Zeno, 71, American bassist, cancer.

=== 4 ===
- Henk Beckers, 81, Dutch politician, senator (2011–2015).
- Herman Branover, 94, Russian-Israeli physicist (SATEC).
- Jorge Calandrelli, 86, Argentine composer.
- André Cerdini, 96, French magistrate.
- Derek Conway, 72, English politician, MP (1983–1997, 2001–2010) and television presenter (Press TV), primary biliary cholangitis.
- Geoff Dakin, 90, South African cricketer (Eastern Province).
- Alexis Dipanda Mouelle, 84, Cameroonian magistrate, president of the supreme court (1990–2014).
- Olivier Dupuis, 68, Belgian politician, MEP (1996–2004).
- Carlos Garaikoetxea, 87, Spanish politician, lehendakari (1979–1985), heart attack.
- Pat Graham, 64, Canadian ice hockey player (Pittsburgh Penguins, Toronto Maple Leafs).
- Stein Erik Hagen, 69, Norwegian industrial conglomerate executive, founder of Rimi, cardiac arrest.
- Marcel Labine, 78, Canadian poet.
- Tatyana Lyubetskaya, 85, Russian fencer.
- George Mische, 88, American Roman Catholic peace activist.
- Kazuhiro Ninomiya, 79, Japanese judoka, Olympic champion (1976).
- Brendan O'Brien, 82, Irish journalist (Prime Time).
- Yuji Ohno, 84, Japanese musician and composer (Lupin III).
- David Plowden, 93, American photographer.
- Hermano da Silva Ramos, 100, French-Brazilian racing driver (Formula One).
- Miguel Ángel J. Márquez Ruiz, 83, Mexican veterinarian.
- Bob Skinner, 94, American baseball player and manager (Pittsburgh Pirates, St. Louis Cardinals, Philadelphia Phillies), World Series champion (1960, 1964, 1979).
- Robert A. Stebbins, 87, American-born Canadian sociologist.
- John Sterling, 87, American sportscaster (New York Yankees, Atlanta Braves), heart failure.
- Jonathan Tiersten, 60, American actor (Sleepaway Camp, Return to Sleepaway Camp, The Perfect House).
- Ion Toderaș, 77, Moldovan ecologist and biologist, member of the Academy of Sciences of Moldova.
- Konstantin Tolkachyov, 73, Russian politician, speaker of the State Assembly of the Republic of Bashkortostan (since 1999), cancer.
- George Trahern, 89, American politician, member of the Oregon House of Representatives (1981–1988).
- Eladio Zárate, 84, Paraguayan football player (Huracán, Unión Española, national team) and manager.

=== 5 ===
- Dante Ang, 83, Filipino journalist, owner of The Manila Times (since 2001) and chairman of the CFO (2005–2010).
- Val Attenbrow, 84, Australian archaeologist.
- Bob Belden, 78, American football player (Dallas Cowboys).
- Trevor Bennett, 99, Canadian politician, Newfoundland MHA (1982–1985).
- Richard Cameron, 77, English playwright.
- Pierre Chambon, 95, French biologist, member of the French Academy of Sciences.
- R. B. Choudary, 77, Indian film producer (Pudhu Vasantham, Raja, Aanandham), traffic collision.
- Crystal R. Emery, 65, American film director and producer (The Deadliest Disease in America).
- Peter Ferrara, 71, American lawyer and policy analyst.
- Soledad Gallego-Díaz, 75, Spanish journalist, editor of El País (2018–2020).
- René Groebli, 98, Swiss photographer.
- Terje Haugland, 82, Norwegian long jumper.
- Cheryl Mary Clare Hurst, 63, Antiguan and Barbudan politician, senator (2014–2026).
- Daniel W. Jones, 81, American politician, member of the New Hampshire House of Representatives (1978–1980).
- Timo Kautonen, 81, Finnish footballer (Reipas, Kuusysi, national team).
- Viktor Kuzmenko, 42, Ukrainian rescuer and civil defense officer, Hero of Ukraine (2025), airstrike.
- Lee Hong-koo, 91, South Korean diplomat and politician, prime minister (1994–1995) and ambassador to the United States (1998–2000).
- Kyle Loftis, 43, American internet personality and businessman.
- Temur Maisuradze, 66, Georgian politician, MP (2012–2016).
- Guto Graça Mello, 78, Brazilian composer and music producer.
- Claude Morin, 96, Canadian politician, Quebec MNA (1976–1981).
- Santhosh K. Nayar, 65, Indian actor (Nishedhi, Kurishuyudham, Vasantha Sena), heart attack.
- José Ortiz, 62, Puerto Rican Hall of Fame basketball player (Atléticos de San Germán, Cangrejeros de Santurce, national team), colorectal cancer.
- Pierre Pascallon, 84, French politician, deputy (1986–1988, 1993–1997), mayor of Issoire (1989–2008).
- Servet Pëllumbi, 89, Albanian politician, speaker of parliament (2002–2005).
- Chris Phelan, 70, Irish-born Australian rugby league player (Parramatta Eels, Oldham, Queensland), pancreatic cancer.
- Donald Ross, 85, American politician, member of the Oklahoma House of Representatives (1983–2003).
- Bill Smalley, 83, New Zealand cricketer (Auckland).
- Yevhen Syvokin, 88, Ukrainian film director.
- Idris Tarangzai, 64, Pakistani Islamic scholar and politician, Khyber Pakhtunkhwa MPA (2002–2007), shot.
- Howard Thorsen, 92, American vice admiral.
- Valeri Zhabko, 58, Russian footballer (Torpedo Volzhsky, Tekstilshchik, Metallurg Lipetsk).

=== 6 ===
- Judith Barnard, 94, American writer (Judith Michael), heart failure.
- Evaristo Beccalossi, 69, Italian footballer (Brescia, Inter Milan, Sampdoria), complications from a cerebral haemorrhage.
- Harold K. Brown, 92, American civil rights leader.
- Georgina Cates, 51, English actress (2point4 Children, An Awfully Big Adventure, Clay Pigeons).
- Vladimir Cvetković, 84, Serbian basketball player (Crvena zvezda, Yugoslavia national team) and sports administrator, Olympic silver medallist (1968).
- László Fazekas, 78, Hungarian football player (Újpesti Dózsa, Royal Antwerp, national team) and manager, Olympic champion (1968), complications from amyotrophic lateral sclerosis.
- Georgy Golitsyn, 91, Russian atmospheric physicist, member of the Russian Academy of Sciences.
- Jake Hall, 35, British actor, model and reality television star (The Only Way Is Essex), head injury.
- Russ Hodge, 86, American Olympic decathlete (1964).
- Manuela Hoelterhoff, 77, German-born American cultural journalist (Bloomberg News), cancer.
- Dick Hughes, 88, American baseball player (St. Louis Cardinals).
- Aimable Karasira, 48, Rwandan singer and political activist, drug overdose.
- Rajko Kasagić, 83, Bosnian Serb politician, prime minister of Republika Srpska (1995–1996).
- Heinrich Kofler, 96, Austrian politician, member of the Landtag of Vorarlberg (1974–1980, 1981–1984).
- Algis Jurgis Kundrotas, 75, Lithuanian physicist.
- Mert Lawwill, 85, American motorcycle racer and designer, subject of On Any Sunday.
- Carlos Malcolm, 91, Jamaican trombonist, percussionist, and bandleader.
- John L. Marion, 92, American auctioneer.
- José Navarro, 77, Peruvian footballer (Defensor Arica, Sporting Cristal, national team).
- Kenji Ohba, 71, Japanese actor (Space Sheriff Gavan, Battle Fever J, Denshi Sentai Denjiman) and stuntman.
- Marc Plantegenest, 82, French politician, deputy (1978–1981), senator (1981–1986).
- Chandranath Rath, 41, Indian political strategist, shot.
- Anatoly Rusanov, 94, Russian chemist, member of the Russian Academy of Sciences.
- Ronald Russell, 71, American Virgin Islander Olympic sprinter (1976, 1984).
- Fili Seru, 56, Fijian rugby union (national team) and league (Hull, national team) player, complications from motor neuron disease.
- Lawrence J. Smith, 85, American politician, member of the U.S. House of Representatives (1983–1993).
- Aryeh Stern, 81, Israeli rabbi.
- Ted Turner, 87, American Hall of Fame media proprietor (CNN) and sports team owner (Atlanta Braves), founder of Turner Broadcasting System, complications from Lewy body dementia.
- Pierre-François Veil, 72, French lawyer and civil servant, president of the Fondation pour la Mémoire de la Shoah (since 2023).
- Liviu Volconovici, 69, Moldovan agronomist, academic and politician, minister of agriculture, regional development and environment (2018).
- Morris Watts, 88, American football player (Tulsa) and coach.
- Janet Healy Weeks, 93, American lawyer and judge.
- Cavayé Yéguié Djibril, 86, Cameroonian politician, member (since 1983) and president (1992–2026) of the National Assembly.
- Charle Young, 75, American Hall of Fame football player (San Francisco 49ers, Philadelphia Eagles), Super Bowl champion (1982).

=== 7 ===
- Jaime Aparicio, 96, Colombian Olympic hurdler (1948, 1956).
- Raymonde Arcier, 86, French artist and feminist activist.
- Åke Axelsson, 94, Swedish interior designer.
- Ursula Bäumlin, 87, Swiss politician, MP (1987–1998).
- Eugenio Binini, 91, Italian Roman Catholic prelate, bishop of Pitigliano-Sovana-Orbetello (1983–1991) and Massa Carrara-Pontremoli (1991–2010).
- Michael J. Bransfield, 82, American Roman Catholic prelate, bishop of Wheeling–Charleston (2004–2018).
- Carlos Brito, 93, Portuguese politician, deputy (1980–1991).
- Pat Caputo, 67, American sportswriter and broadcaster (WXYT-FM), pancreatic cancer.
- Philip Caputo, 84, American author (A Rumor of War) and journalist, cancer.
- Giovanni Cervetti, 92, Italian politician, deputy (1987–1994) and MEP (1984–1989).
- Harriet Crawford, 88, British archaeologist.
- Valery Denisov, 84, Russian diplomat, ambassador to North Korea (1996–2001).
- Jana Dubovcová, 73, Slovak politician, minister of justice (2023) and MNC (2010–2012).
- Claude Griscelli, 90, French doctor and immunologist, president of Inserm (1996–2001).
- Günter Jena, 93, German church music director (St. Michaelis, Hamburg) and musicologist.
- Rick Kreuger, 77, American baseball player (Boston Red Sox).
- Nabyl Lahlou, 81, Moroccan film director (Le Gouverneur General de l'ile Chakerbakerben, Brahim Who?, The Night of the Crime) and playwright.
- Joni Lamb, 65, American Christian broadcaster, co-founder and president of Daystar Television Network, complications from bone cancer.
- Bede Liu, 91, Taiwanese-American electrical engineer.
- Earl-Jean McCrea, 83, American singer (The Cookies).
- Michael Pennington, 82, English actor (Return of the Jedi, The Iron Lady), co-founder of the English Shakespeare Company and writer.
- Friedrich Seifert, 84, German mineralogist and geophysicist.
- Joe Senser, 69, American football player (Minnesota Vikings).
- James F. Sundah, 70, Indonesian songwriter.
- Harold Theriault, 73, Canadian politician, Nova Scotia MLA (2003–2013).
- Geoff Wadge, 76, British volcanologist.
- Robert Whealey, 95, American historian.
- Wang Yongguo, 87, Chinese vice admiral, commander of the South Sea Fleet (1994–2002).
- Ryszard Zembaczyński, 77, Polish politician, mayor of Opole (2002–2014).
- Zhang Anjian, 55, Chinese politician, deputy mayor of Chongqing.

=== 8 ===
- Auroras Encore, 24, Irish Thoroughbred racehorse. (death announced on this date)
- Betty Broderick, 78, American convicted murderer, complications from a fall and sepsis.
- Jo Ann Castle, 86, American honky-tonk pianist (The Lawrence Welk Show).
- Kapila Chandrasena, 61, Sri Lankan telecommunications and airlines executive, CEO of SriLankan Airlines, Mihin Lanka and SLTMobitel.
- Nicola Colombo, 57, Italian football executive, chairman of Monza (2015–2018).
- Abdelwahab Doukkali, 85, Moroccan composer and musician.
- Patrick Dourado, 86, Indian playwright.
- Melo Freire, 99, Brazilian politician, deputy (1975–1991).
- Agberto Matos, 54, Brazilian Olympic handball player (1996, 2004).
- Punch McLean, 93, Canadian ice hockey coach (New Westminster Bruins), traffic collision.
- Festus Mogae, 86, Botswanan politician and economist, president (1998–2008), vice-president (1991–1998), and minister of finance (1989–1998).
- Harald Mothes, 69, German footballer (Wismut Aue, TSV Ampfing, East Germany national team).
- Ravi Pandit, 75, Indian technology executive, co-founder of KPIT Technologies.
- Karl-Heinz Ripkens, 88, German footballer (1. FC Köln, Bayer Leverkusen).
- Anna Ritchie, 82, British archaeologist and historian.
- Tore Ryen, 79, Norwegian television producer and writer (Mot i brøstet).
- Haerul Saleh, 44, Indonesian politician, MP (2014–2019, 2020–2022), burns.
- Joe Sedelmaier, 92, American television advertising director.
- Karin Spaink, 68, Dutch journalist (Het Parool) and feminist activist.
- Kiara St. James, 52–53, American transgender activist, cancer.
- Koji Suzuki, 68, Japanese writer (Ring, Dark Water).
- Germán Vargas Lleras, 64, Colombian politician, vice-president (2014–2017), minister of the interior (2010–2012), and president of the Senate (2003–2004), brain cancer.
- Joyce Woodhouse, 82, American politician, member of the Nevada Senate (2006–2010, 2012–2020).

=== 9 ===
- Antonio Becerra Gaytán, 93, Mexican politician, deputy (1979–1982), member of the Congress of Chihuahua (1989–1992).
- Bruno Bischofberger, 86, Swiss art dealer.
- Theo van Boven, 91, Dutch jurist.
- Martyn Chamberlain, 78-79, British experimental physicist and academic.
- Bobby Cox, 84, American Hall of Fame baseball manager (Atlanta Braves, Toronto Blue Jays), player (New York Yankees), and coach, World Series champion (1977, 1995).
- Thomas G. Darling, 94, American air force general.
- Maurice Freund, 82, French tourism personality and businessman (Point Air).
- Robert D. Garton, 92, American politician, member (1970–2006) and president pro tempore (1980–2006) of the Indiana Senate.
- Edward Giobbi, 99, American artist and cookbook author.
- Alan Gribben, 84, American literary scholar.
- Jennifer Harmon, 82, American actress (How to Survive a Marriage, One Life to Live).
- Frid Ingulstad, 90, Norwegian novelist and stenographer, complications from Parkinson's disease.
- Ioan Isaiu, 56, Romanian actor, heart attack.
- Jean-Clément Jeanbart, 83, Syrian Melkite Catholic hierarch, archbishop of Aleppo (1995–2021).
- Kevin McKenzie, 77, South African cricketer (Transvaal).
- Craig Morton, 83, American football player (Dallas Cowboys, Denver Broncos).
- Philippe Mpay, 86–87, Cameroonian army officer.
- Kevin Ndjomo, Cameroonian sports journalist (Cameroon Radio Television).
- Bill Posey, 78, American politician, member of the U.S. House of Representatives (2009–2025) and the Florida Senate (2000–2008) and House of Representatives (1992–2000).
- Dennis Rush, 74, American actor (Man of a Thousand Faces, The Andy Griffith Show, Wagon Train).
- Michael Sefi, 82, British philatelist, heart and lung disease.
- Mark Smythe, 53, New Zealand-born American composer (Daddy's Little Girl, Unfallen, The Reef: Stalked), atherosclerotic cardiovascular disease.
- Åsfrid Svensen, 89, Norwegian literary historian.
- Gerald Talbot, 94, American politician and civil rights leader, member of the Maine House of Representatives (1972–1978).
- Allan Thigo, 77, Kenyan footballer (Gor Mahia, national team).
- Warren Tipton, 67, American singer (The Chi-Lites).
- Margareta Waterman, 93, American poet and publisher.

=== 10 ===
- José Ballesta, 67, Spanish politician, medical doctor and academic, mayor of Murcia (2015–2021, since 2023), cancer.
- John Barbour, 93, Canadian actor, comedian and television presenter (Real People).
- J. J. Barrie, 92, Canadian singer ("No Charge"), songwriter and comedian.
- Anja Breien, 85, Norwegian film director (Arven, Rape, Games of Love and Loneliness).
- David Burke, 91, British actor (Sherlock Holmes, Reilly, Ace of Spies, The Love School).
- René Cárdenas, 96, Nicaraguan sportswriter (La Prensa) and announcer (Los Angeles Dodgers).
- Anne Cohen, 85, Australian politician, member of the New South Wales Legislative Assembly (1988–1995).
- Jim Colbert, 85, American golfer.
- Legh Davis, 85, Australian politician, South Australian MLC (1979–2002).
- Jan E. DuBois, 95, American jurist, judge of the U.S. District Court for Eastern Pennsylvania (since 1988).
- Ali Fassi-Fihri, 71, Moroccan civil servant and business executive, president of the Royal Moroccan Football Federation (2009–2013).
- Abraham Foxman, 86, American lawyer and activist, director of the Anti-Defamation League (1987–2015).
- Günther Maria Halmer, 83, German actor (Sophie's Choice, Gandhi, Amen.).
- Rainer Nitschke, 79, German radio and television presenter.
- Mary Lovelace O'Neal, 84, American artist and arts educator.
- Ralph Ottey, 102, Jamaican-born British author and World War II veteran.
- Mark Ratner, 83, American chemist.
- Doug Searl, 79, Australian footballer (Fitzroy, Collingwood).
- Cyril Simard, 87, Canadian architect and ethnologist.
- D. Sudhakar, 66, Indian politician, Karnataka MLA (2004–2018, since 2023), complications from a lung infection.
- Margaretha af Ugglas, 87, Swedish politician, minister for foreign affairs (1991–1994), MP (1974–1995).
- Kenneth B. Wiberg, 98, American chemist.

=== 11 ===
- Mal Anderson, 91, Australian Hall of Fame tennis player.
- Abdul Rahman Abu Zahra, 92, Egyptian actor.
- W. Mark Bassett, 59, American LDS religious authority and business executive, traumatic brain injury.
- Buzz Capra, 78, American baseball player (New York Mets, Atlanta Braves).
- Brandon Clarke, 29, Canadian-American basketball player (Gonzaga Bulldogs, Memphis Grizzlies), drug overdose.
- Coquito, 60, Uruguayan footballer (Peñarol, Deportivo Morón, national team).
- Jack Douglas, 80, American record producer (Rocks, Cheap Trick, Double Fantasy).
- Alexx Ekubo, 40, Nigerian actor (Weekend Getaway, Lagos Cougars, The Bling Lagosians), kidney cancer.
- Brett Fancy, 62, English actor (EastEnders, Outpost, Resort to Murder).
- Maxwell Gamble, 87, Australian Olympic rower (1960).
- Lou Graham, 88, American golfer, U.S. Open champion (1975).
- Mbemba Jatta, Gambian politician, MP (1982–1994).
- David Lee, 82, American football player (Baltimore Colts).
- David Lewis, 85, Welsh cricketer (Glamorgan, Transvaal).
- Rainer Lux, 75, German politician, member of the Landtag of North Rhine-Westphalia (1995–2010).
- Metronade, 23, American social media influencer, blunt force trauma.
- Hélène Mignon, 91, French politician, MP (1988–1993, 1997–2007) and mayor of Muret (1989–1995).
- Vladimir Molchanov, 75, Russian television host and journalist.
- Xuong Nguyen-Huu, 92, American biochemist.
- Didier Pillet, 77, French journalist, editor-in-chief of Ouest-France (1991–2005).
- Dovid Shmidel, 92, Israeli rabbi, chairman of Asra Kadisha (since 1977).
- Silva, 67, Brazilian footballer (Botafogo, América de Natal, national team).
- Bagi Kumar Verma, 77, Indian politician, Bihar MLA (1995–2005, 2020–2025).
- José Adriano Gago Vitorino, 80–81, Portuguese politician, MP (1976–1985), secretary of state for emigration and the Portuguese communities (1981–1983).
- Lilly Yokoi, 97, American bicycle acrobat.

=== 12 ===
- Abba Anas Adamu, 69, Nigerian politician.
- Patrick Arnold, 59, American organic chemist (BALCO scandal).
- Barry W. Blaustein, 71, American screenwriter (Coming to America, The Nutty Professor) and film director (Beyond the Mat), pancreatic cancer.
- Jean Bonfils, 96, French Roman Catholic prelate, bishop of Viviers (1992–1998) and Nice (1998–2005).
- Tutu Bose, 78, Indian politician, MP (2005–2011) and sports administrator, president of Mohun Bagan AC.
- Stanisława Celińska, 79, Polish actress (Mamuśki, The Maids of Wilko, Landscape After the Battle).
- Jason Collins, 47, American basketball player (New Jersey Nets, Atlanta Hawks, Boston Celtics), glioblastoma.
- John Thomas Copenhaver Jr., 100, American jurist, judge of the U.S. District Court for Southern West Virginia (since 1976).
- Pedro Feist, 90, Portuguese politician, MP (1983–1987, 1995–1999).
- Romuald Figuier, 88, French singer.
- Mark Fuhrman, 74, American detective (Murder trial of O. J. Simpson), throat cancer.
- Donald Gibb, 71, American actor (Revenge of the Nerds, Bloodsport, 1st & Ten), complications from throat cancer.
- Miriam Gonczarska, 53, Polish spiritual leader and journalist.
- Graham Goninon, 81, Australian footballer (Fitzroy).
- Al Gregg, 62, English musician (The Wall), actor (ScreenPlay, Doctor Who) and screenwriter.
- Izo Hashimoto, 72, Japanese screenwriter (Akira), rectal cancer.
- Alexander Held, 67, German actor (Der Untergang, Sophie Scholl - Die letzten Tage, Der Baader Meinhof Komplex).
- Zenonas Juknevičius, 76, Lithuanian politician and lawyer, minister of justice (1992).
- Bobby Keasler, 80, American college football coach (McNeese State Cowboys, Louisiana-Monroe Warhawks).
- Bassek Ba Kobhio, 69, Cameroonian writer and filmmaker (The Great White Man of Lambaréné, Le silence de la forêt).
- Nina M. Litvinova, 80, Russian human rights activist and oceanographer, suicide.
- Herbert Lust, 99, American art collector.
- Yebrgual Melese, 36, Ethiopian long-distance runner.
- Ataur Rahman, 84, Bangladeshi actor.
- Rex Reed, 87, American film critic (The New York Observer), journalist and actor (Inchon, Myra Breckinridge).
- William V. Tamborlane, 79, American pediatrician and academic.
- Jack Taylor, 99, American actor (Succubus, Conan the Barbarian, The Ninth Gate).
- Kshetrimayum Ongbi Thouranisabi Devi, 91, Indian classical dancer.
- Emil Paul Tscherrig, 79, Swiss Roman Catholic cardinal, apostolic nuncio to Korea (2004–2008), Argentina (2012–2017) and Italy (2017–2024).
- Anna Wagner, 111, Austrian supercentenarian.
- Albrecht Weinberg, 101, German Holocaust survivor.
- Herb Wharton, 89–90, Australian writer. (death announced on this date)

=== 13 ===
- DuWayne Bridges, 79, American politician, member of the Alabama House of Representatives (2000–2014).
- Kevin Buys, 40, South African rugby union player (Brive, Lions, Southern Kings), heart attack.
- Clarence Carter, 90, American singer-songwriter ("Slip Away", "Patches", "Strokin'"), complications from pneumonia, prostate cancer and sepsis.
- Khalifa Chater, 90, Tunisian academic and historian.
- Fleury Di Nallo, 83, French footballer (Olympique Lyonnais, Montpellier, national team).
- El Cabrero, 81, Spanish flamenco singer.
- Richard Falbr, 85, Czech politician, MEP (2004–2014), senator (1996–2004), president of the ČMKOS (1994–2002).
- Hilda Farfante, 95, Spanish teacher and activist.
- Liah Greenfeld, 71, Russian-born Israeli-American sociologist and anthropologist.
- Mosharraf Hossain, 83, Bangladeshi politician, MP (1973–2024), minister of civil aviation and tourism (1997–2001) and twice of housing and public works.
- M. P. Jayasinghe, 81, Sri Lankan lawyer and politician, governor of Uva (2015–2018) and North Central (2018) provinces.
- Luna Jordan, 25, German actress.
- Sir Kenneth Keith, 88, New Zealand jurist and legal scholar, Supreme Court justice (2004–2005), judge of the International Court of Justice (2006–2015).
- Hamad Kalkaba Malboum, 75, Cameroonian athletics official, president of the Confederation of African Athletics (since 2003).
- Selimir Milošević, 86, Serbian football player (Red Star Belgrade, Oakland Clippers) and manager (Pelita Jaya).
- David Morelock, 94, American opera director.
- Boutros Mouallem, 98, Israeli Melkite Greek Catholic hierarch, bishop of Nossa Senhora do Paraíso em São Paulo (1990–1998) and archbishop of Akka (1998–2003).
- Vladimir Ovchinnikov, 88, Russian painter, ethnographer and social activist.
- Richard Palais, 94, American mathematician.
- Dionisio Quintana, 68, Cuban javelin thrower and trainer.
- Dileep Raj, 47, Indian actor (Milana, U Turn, Mahanadi), heart attack.
- Mike Salisbury, 84, British filmmaker and producer (Lost Worlds, Vanished Lives, The Life of Birds, Life in the Undergrowth).
- Peter Simpson, 81, English footballer (Arsenal, New England Tea Men, Hendon). (death announced on this date)
- Ladislav Skula, 88, Czech mathematician and academic.
- Manfred Steinbach, 92, German Olympic sprinter (1956) and long jumper (1960).
- Paul Wischeidt, 82, German Olympic fencer (1968, 1972).

=== 14 ===
- James F. Almand, 77, American politician, member of the Virginia House of Delegates (1978–2004).
- Marin Andrei, 85, Romanian footballer (Rapid București, national team).
- Zoya Boguslavskaya, 102, Russian poet and writer.
- Paul Boutilier, 63, Canadian ice hockey player (New York Islanders, Winnipeg Jets, Boston Bruins).
- Thomas E. Breidenthal, 75, American Episcopal prelate, bishop of Southern Ohio (2007–2020).
- Pierre Cao, 88, Luxembourgish composer and conductor.
- Raúl Castronovo, 77, Argentine footballer (Rosario Central, Nancy, Málaga).
- Brian Clouston, 91, British landscape architect.
- Apollinaire Compaoré, 72, Burkinabè businessman.
- Valie Export, 85, Austrian artist.
- Takahiro Fujiwara, 43, Japanese voice actor (My Hero Academia, Berserk, Captain Earth).
- Noel Galea Bason, 71, Maltese medalist and sculptor.
- Sophie Garel, 84, French media presenter (Les Grosses Têtes) and singer.
- David Henderson, 83, American writer and poet.
- Hans van Houwelingen, 81, Dutch mathematician and professor of medical statistics.
- Michael Hristov, 21, American serial killer.
- Raymond Eugene Johnson, 52, American convicted murderer, execution by lethal injection.
- Caroline Jones, 71, Welsh politician, MS (2016–2021), sepsis.
- Claudine Longet, 84, French-American singer and actress (McHale's Navy, The Party).
- Rubem Medina, 83, Brazilian politician, deputy (1967–2003).
- Abdelmadjid Meskoud, 73, Algerian chaabi singer, complications from a stroke.
- Harald Metzkes, 97, German painter and graphic artist.
- Godefroid Mukeng'a Kalond, 95, Congolese Roman Catholic prelate, bishop of Luiza (1971–1997) and archbishop of Kananga (1997–2006).
- Pete Naaden, 98, American politician, member of the North Dakota House of Representatives (1973–2000).
- Fred Nesler, 81, American politician, member of the Kentucky House of Representatives (1993–2014).
- Leonardo Palacios, 93, Ecuadorian footballer (Everest, Aucas, national team.
- Jean-Marc Palm, 75, Burkinabé politician, minister for foreign affairs (1987–1989).
- Krzysztof Piesiewicz, 80, Polish screenwriter (No End, The Double Life of Veronique) and politician, senator (1991–1993, 1997–2011).
- Stanisław Rakowicz, 90, Polish politician, voivode of Toruń (1988–1990).
- Alan Rothwell, 89, English actor (Coronation Street, Brookside, Heartbeat) and television presenter.
- Sudhangshu Seal, 81, Indian politician, MP (2004–2009) and West Bengal MLA (2001–2004).
- Morris Soller, 94–95, American-Israeli agricultural geneticist. (death announced on this date)
- John Bryan Taylor, 97, British physicist.
- Teh Kew San, 91, Malaysian badminton player, complications from a urinary tract infection.
- Timmy, humpback whale. (body discovered on this date)
- Nikolay Tsaturyan, 81, Armenian theatre director.
- Jorge Urquía, 79, Honduran footballer (Mallorca, Alavés, national team).

=== 15 ===
- Jules Angst, 99, Swiss psychiatrist and academic.
- Jeff Armbruster, 78, American politician, cancer.
- Bengt Berger, 83, Swedish jazz drummer, composer (Bitter Funeral Beer) and producer.
- Aleksandr Borovkov, 95, Russian mathematician, member of the Russian Academy of Sciences.
- Yahya Dehghanpour, 85, Iranian photographer.
- Cris Derksen, 45, Canadian Cree cellist and composer, traffic collision.
- Angelica Domröse, 85, German actress (Love's Confusion, The Adventures of Werner Holt, The Legend of Paul and Paula).
- Izz al-Din al-Haddad, 55–56, Palestinian Islamic militant, commander of Hamas in the Gaza Strip (since 2025), airstrike.
- Jean Harlez, 101, Belgian film director.
- Jane Healy, 77, American journalist (Orlando Sentinel).
- Boogaloo Joe Jones, 85, American jazz guitarist.
- Malik Nadeem Kamran, 72, Pakistani politician, Punjab MPA (1997–1999, 2008–2023).
- André Laliberté, 79, Canadian marionette puppeteer.
- Sherman Lewis, 83, American football player (Toronto Argonauts, New York Jets) and coach (Green Bay Packers), four-time Super Bowl champion.
- Conceição Lima, 64, São Toméan poet (A Dolorosa Raiz do Micondó).
- Brian Lindstrom, 65, American documentary filmmaker (Alien Boy: The Life and Death of James Chasse), complications from progressive supranuclear palsy.
- Dame Felicity Lott, 79, English soprano, cancer.
- Egon Loy, 95, German footballer (Eintracht Frankfurt).
- Jimmy Mann, 73, English footballer (Bristol City, Barnsley, Doncaster Rovers).
- João Abel Manta, 98, Portuguese architect, painter and cartoonist.
- Randal Marlin, 88, Canadian academic.
- Jon Phipps McCalla, 79, American jurist, judge (since 1992) and chief judge (2008–2013) of the U.S. District Court for the Western District of Tennessee.
- Jilke Michielsen, 19, Belgian racing cyclist, Ewing sarcoma.
- Alan Morton, 91, Australian rugby union player (Randwick DRUFC, UBC Thunderbirds, national team).
- Telesphore George Mpundu, 78, Zambian Roman Catholic prelate, coadjutor archbishop (2004–2006) and archbishop (2006–2018) of Lusaka.
- Loretta Pettway, 83, American artist and quilt maker.
- Edmund Phelps, 92, American economist, Nobel Prize laureate (2006), complications from Alzheimer's disease.
- Peter H. Salus, 88, American linguist and author.
- Dominic Su Haw Chiu, 86, Malaysian Roman Catholic prelate, bishop of Sibu (1987–2011).
- Shin'ichirō Tawata, 78, Japanese linguist, pancreatic cancer.
- Bas Westerweel, 62, Dutch radio and television presenter (Het Klokhuis).
- Tony Zappone, 78, American journalist and radio personality.

=== 16 ===
- Hajibaba Azimov, 87, Azerbaijani politician, member of the Supreme Soviet (1991–1995).
- Albert Beckles, 95, Barbadian-born British bodybuilder.
- Silvio Benedetto, 88, Argentine painter.
- Stephen Bungay, 71, British historian and author.
- Tarsy Carballas, 91, Spanish soil scientist.
- Gary Cutsinger, 86, American football player (Houston Oilers).
- John Geddes, 89, British track cyclist, Olympic bronze medallist (1956).
- Frank Hayden, 96, Canadian academic, Special Olympics executive director (1972).
- Tatsuya Hori, 90, Japanese politician, governor of Hokkaido (1995–2003), lung cancer.
- Jean Houston, 89, American author.
- Predrag Koraksić Corax, 92, Serbian political cartoonist.
- Frank Land, 97, German-born British information systems researcher, infection.
- Dennis Locorriere, 76, American singer and guitarist (Dr. Hook), kidney disease.
- Bushy Maape, 68, South African politician, premier of North West (2021–2024).
- John Maclean, 80, Australian cricketer (Queensland, national team).
- Jean-Claude Maene, 71, Belgian politician, MP (2004–2007), Walloon deputy (2009–2014).
- Quinn G. McKay, 99, American academic, writer and Mormon leader.
- Dai-won Moon, 83, South Korean-born Mexican taekwondo practitioner.
- Mike Nelson, 71, American politician, member of the Minnesota House of Representatives (2003–2025).
- E. J. Peaker, 82, American actress (Hello, Dolly!, That's Life, The All-American Boy), complications from Alzheimer's disease.
- Ryan Porter, 46, American jazz trombonist (West Coast Get Down), injuries sustained from traffic collision.
- Altaf Hassan Qureshi, 96, Pakistani journalist (Urdu Digest).
- James Robison, 82, American televangelist.
- Ian Russell, 79, British folklorist.
- Mizanur Rahman Sinha, 83, Bangladeshi politician, MP (1996–2006).
- Chris Williams, 89, English-born Canadian Anglican clergyman, bishop of the Arctic (1991–2002).
- Ike Willis, 70, American vocalist and guitarist (Frank Zappa), prostate cancer.

=== 17 ===
- Toyabali Ahmadali, 95, Surinamese politician.
- Mohamed Ali Hafez, Saudi Arabian scouting executive and journalist, co-founder of Arab News.
- Bob Andrews, 90, English-New Zealand motorcycle speedway rider (Wimbledon Dons, Cradley Heathens, New Zealand national team).
- Peter Checkland, 95, British management scientist and academic.
- Cho Il-hyeon, 70, South Korean politician, MP (1992–1996, 2004–2008).
- Luis de la Peña, 94, Mexican physicist.
- Adrián Lorenzo Fernández, 82, Guatemalan footballer (Tipografía Nacional, Municipal, national team).
- Scott Hastings, 61, Scottish rugby union player (Watsonians, Edinburgh, national team), non-Hodgkin lymphoma.
- Michael M. May, 100, French-born American theoretical physicist.
- Peter G. Neumann, 93, American computer science researcher, complications from a fall.
- Michael Oyedokun, 57, Nigerian schoolteacher, beheaded.
- Jennifer Paes, 72, Indian basketball player (national team), cancer.
- K. Rajan, 85, Indian film producer (Doubles, Ninaikkatha Naalillai) and director (Unarchigal), suicide by jumping.
- Gérard Revol, 89, French politician, deputy (1997–2002), mayor of Bagnols-sur-Cèze (1995–2001).
- Max Samper, 87, French footballer (RC Paris, Angoulême, national team).
- Rob Schumacher, 62, American photojournalist.
- M. J. K. Smith, 92, English cricketer (Leicestershire, Warwickshire, national team).
- Rab Smith, 77, Scottish darts player.
- Anton Švajlen, 88, Slovak footballer (VSS Košice), Olympic silver medalist (1964).
- Totó la Momposina, 85, Colombian singer (La Candela Viva).
- Brenda Travis, 81, American civil rights campaigner.
- Juris Upatnieks, 90, Latvian-American physicist and inventor.

=== 18 ===
- Abomé l'Éléphant, 33, Ivorian singer and rapper, cardiac arrest.
- Feliksas Bajoras, 91, Lithuanian composer and academic.
- Tore Berger, 81, Norwegian sprint canoeist, Olympic champion (1968) and bronze medallist (1972).
- Huguette Bouchardeau, 90, French politician, minister of the environment (1984–1986), deputy (1986–1993), and mayor of Aigues-Vives (1995–2001).
- Alan Bradley, 87, Canadian author (The Sweetness at the Bottom of the Pie).
- Gianclaudio Bressa, 70, Italian politician, mayor of Belluno (1990–1993), deputy (1996–2018), and senator (2018–2022).
- Ofer Bronchtein, 69, French-Israeli peace activist and diplomat, complications from chronic obstructive pulmonary disease.
- Serigne Ibrahima Mahmoud Cissé, 73–74, Senegalese teacher and religious guide.
- Étienne Davignon, 93, Belgian diplomat and civil servant, European commissioner (1977–1985).
- Piper J. Drake, 49, American author, cervical cancer.
- Jerry Grey, 62, American professional wrestler, colon cancer.
- Gunter Hampel, 88, German jazz multi-instrumentalist and composer.
- Sally Head, 79, British television producer (Cracker, Prime Suspect, Jeeves and Wooster), cancer.
- Crawford Henry, 88, American tennis player.
- Jim Irvine, 85, Scottish footballer (Dundee United, Middlesbrough, Barrow).
- Tom Kane, 64, American voice actor (The Powerpuff Girls, Star Wars, The Wild Thornberrys), complications from a stroke.
- Helmut F. Kaplan, 73, Austrian philosopher.
- Stepan Kubiv, 64, Ukrainian politician, first deputy prime minister (2016–2019) and chairman of the national bank (2014), thrombosis.
- Meredith Lillich, 94, American art historian.
- Jacqueline Maurer-Mayor, 78, Swiss politician, member of the Grand Council of Vaud (1978–1985, 1989–1997) and of the Council of State of Vaud (1997–2007).
- Aldo Naouri, 88, French paediatric psychologist and psychoanalyst.
- Ole Nydahl, 85, Danish lama.
- Caitlin O'Heaney, 73, American actress (Tales of the Gold Monkey, He Knows You're Alone, Apple Pie).
- Patriotic Kenny, 84, American navy veteran and influencer, lung cancer and congestive heart failure.
- José Ribamar Pereira, 81, Brazilian politician, Piauí MLA (1999–2003, 2011).
- Ulises Schmill Ordóñez, 89, Mexican judge, minister (1985–1994) and president of the supreme court (1991–1994).
- Carey Scurry, 63, American basketball player (Utah Jazz, New York Knicks).
- Gregory D. Shorey Jr., 101, American politician.
- Geovani Silva, 62, Brazilian footballer (Vasco da Gama, Bologna, national team), Olympic silver medallist (1988), organ failure.
- Marideth Sisco, 82, American author and musician.
- Patrick Sookhdeo, 79, British activist, founder and director of Barnabas Aid (1993–2015).
- Toshifumi Suzuki, 93, Japanese convenience store executive, CEO of 7-Eleven (2005–2016), heart failure.
- Lage Tedenby, 88, Swedish Olympic steeplechaser (1960).
- Pinky Winters, 95, American jazz singer.

=== 19 ===
- João Maurício Adeodato, 70, Brazilian jurist and legal philosopher.
- Henri Barki, 75, Turkish-Canadian social scientist.
- Tito Benady, 95, Gibraltarian historian.
- Jacqui Chan, 91, Trinidadian actress (The World of Suzie Wong, Cleopatra, Krakatoa, East of Java), dancer and singer.
- Jacob Cress, 81, American furniture maker.
- George Eastman, 83, Italian actor (Antropophagus, Rabid Dogs) and screenwriter (Keoma).
- Barney Frank, 86, American politician, member of the U.S. House of Representatives (1981–2013), heart failure.
- Christian Freeling, 79, Dutch game designer (Dameo, Grand Chess, Havannah).
- Ran Hirschl, 62, Canadian political scientist, cancer.
- Peter Hollingworth, 91, Australian Anglican bishop, archbishop of Brisbane (1989–2001) and governor-general (2001–2003).
- Al Hurricane Jr., 66, American singer-songwriter.
- Robert Irving, 71, Canadian conglomerate industry and ice hockey executive, co-CEO (1992–2024) and CEO (since 2024) of J.D. Irving, president of the Moncton Wildcats (since 1996), cancer.
- B. C. Khanduri, 91, Indian politician, chief minister of Uttarakhand (2007–2009, 2011–2012), minister of road transport and highways (2000–2004), and three-time MP.
- Aglaia Kremezi, 79, Greek food writer and journalist, cancer.
- Barbara Lenk, 75, American jurist, judge of the Massachusetts Supreme Judicial Court (2011–2020).
- David Luenberger, 88, American mathematical scientist.
- Roman Matyushin, 71, Russian hieromonk, poet and singer.
- John Middleton, 70, English footballer (Bradford City, Macclesfield Town).
- Ole Wøhlers Olsen, 84, Danish diplomat.
- Karl Pischl, 85, Austrian politician, MP (1972–1990), member of the Federal Council (1994–1997).
- Limmie Pulliam, 50, American tenor.
- Mike Purzycki, 80, American politician, mayor of Wilmington, Delaware (2017–2025), cancer.
- Boris Pushkarev, 96, Czechoslovak-born American urban planner and anti-communism activist.
- Walt Rock, 84, American football player (San Francisco 49ers, Washington Commanders, Florida Blazers).
- Betty Roe, 95, English composer, singer and vocal coach.
- Péter Scherer, 64, Hungarian actor (The Lord's Lantern in Budapest, Kontroll, One Day in Europe).
- Sivaramakichenane Somasegar, 59, Indian software executive and sports team owner, founder of the Seattle Orcas.
- Pierre Sotura, 95, French politician, mayor of L'Île-Saint-Denis (1965–1971), member of the General Council of Hauts-de-Seine (1973–2004).
- Wolfgang Steinmayr, 81, Austrian Olympic racing cyclist (1972, 1976).
- Veronika Valentová, 52, Czech writer and translator.
- Heinz-Helmich van Schewick, 85, German politician, member of the Landtag of North Rhine-Westphalia (1985–2000).
- Mildred Pitts Walter, 103, American writer.
- Dale West, 84, Canadian football player (Saskatchewan Roughriders).
- Herb Wilkinson, 102, American basketball player (Utah Redskins, Iowa Hawkeyes).
- Robert Woodson, 89, American political activist.

=== 20 ===
- Ron Adair, 94, Australian soccer player (Perth Azzurri, Western Australia, national team).
- Raz Adam, 26, Israeli basketball player (Hapoel Tel Aviv), traffic collision.
- Bill Albury, 92, English footballer (Portsmouth, Gillingham, Yeovil Town).
- Kent Broadhurst, 86, American actor (Léon: The Professional, Stars and Bars, Law & Order).
- József Csapó, 88, Romanian politician, deputy (1990–1992), senator (1992–2000).
- Taoufik Cheikhrouhou, 81, Tunisian politician.
- Olivier Creed, 82, French perfumer.
- Klaus Emmerich, 82, German film director (The First Polka, Trokadero).
- Ron Escheté, 77, American jazz guitarist.
- Diane Carlson Evans, 79, American army nurse, cancer.
- Petr Galkin, 67, Russian boxer.
- Mike Galloway, 60, English-born Scottish football player (Halifax Town, Celtic, national team) and coach.
- Imre Géra, 79, Hungarian Olympic cyclist (1968, 1972).
- Phil Hickerson, 79, American professional wrestler (CWA, USWA).
- Jimmy Hughes, 88, American rhythm and blues singer ("Steal Away").
- Mike Johnson, 75, American baseball player (San Diego Padres).
- Jeffrey Lane, 71, American television writer (Ryan's Hope, Mad About You) and playwright (Dirty Rotten Scoundrels).
- Arthur Lewis, 84, Welsh rugby union player (Ebbw Vale, British Lions, national team).
- Leroy McGill, 63, American convicted murder (murder of Charles Perez), executed by lethal injection
- Cleve Moler, 86, American mathematician and computer programmer (MATLAB, MathWorks).
- Tom Moore, 81, American football player (The Citadel Bulldogs) and coach (Clemson Tigers, Gardner–Webb Runnin' Bulldogs).
- Johannes Müller, 57, German politician, member of the Landtag of Saxony (2004–2014).
- Manny Nosowsky, 94, American crossword puzzle creator.
- François Potez, 70–71, French Roman Catholic priest, rector of Saint-Eugène-Sainte-Cécile (1998–2006), Notre-Dame-du-Travail (2007–2019), and Église Saint-Philippe-du-Roule (2022–2025), pancreatic cancer.
- Sivia Qoro, 70, Fijian politician, member of the House of Representatives (2006).
- John Huston Ricard, 86, American Roman Catholic prelate, bishop of Pensacola-Tallahassee (1997–2007) and auxiliary bishop of Baltimore (1984–1997).
- Joy St. Omer, 24, Saint Lucian murder victim, shot.
- Teet Veispak, 70, Estonian historian.
- Inge Wettig-Danielmeier, 89, German politician, treasurer of the SPD (1991–2007), member of the Landtag of Lower Saxony (1972–1990) and the Bundestag (1990–2005).

=== 21 ===
- Jan Adamski, 82, Polish chess player.
- Lennart Aspegren, 94, Swedish judge.
- Matthew Biggs, 65, British radio personality (Gardeners' Question Time), bowel cancer.
- Kyle Busch, 41, American racing driver (NASCAR), two-time Cup Series champion (2015, 2019), complications from pneumonia and sepsis.
- Julienne Bušić, 77, American writer, hijacker (TWA Flight 355) and activist.
- Judith Chalmers, 90, English television presenter (Wish You Were Here...?), complications from Alzheimer's disease.
- DJ Congélateur, 33, Ivorian singer and artist.
- Mary Ellen Edmunds, 86, American Latter-day Saints missionary and speaker.
- John M. Fabian, 87, American astronaut (STS-7, STS-51-G).
- Howard Fendrich, 55, American sportswriter (Associated Press), cancer.
- Liam Ferguson, 85, Irish hurler (St Vincents, Dublin GAA).
- Peter Helm, 84, Canadian-American actor (Inside Daisy Clover, The Andromeda Strain, The Longest Day).
- Liz Howard, 78, Irish camogie player, president of the Camogie Association (2006–2009).
- Lennart Klackenberg, 95, Swedish diplomat.
- Val Lloyd, 82, Welsh politician, member of the Welsh Assembly (2001–2011).
- Dan Newman, 63, Canadian politician, Ontario MPP (1995–2003).
- Carlo Petrini, 76, Italian gastronomist, founder of Slow Food.
- Rafe Pomerance, 79, American environmentalist, lung cancer.
- Gerald M. Pomper, 91, American political scientist.
- Sir Tamati Reedy, 89, New Zealand Māori academic, rugby union player (East Coast, Thames Valley, Māori All Blacks), and public servant.
- Vincenzo Santapaola, 56, Italian mobster (Sicilian Mafia).
- Wendelgard von Staden, 100, German diplomat and author (Darkness Over the Valley: Growing Up in Nazi Germany).
- Kyösti Virrankoski, 82, Finnish politician, MP (1991–1995) and MEP (1996–2009).
- Karl E. Weick, 89, American organizational theorist.

=== 22 ===
- J. Douglas Adams, 76, American school superintendent.
- Rob Base, 59, American rapper (Rob Base & DJ E-Z Rock) and songwriter ("It Takes Two", "Joy and Pain"), cancer.
- Lucille Berrien, 98, American politician and civil rights activist.
- Gerd vom Bruch, 84, German football player (Sportfreunde Siegen) and coach (Borussia Mönchengladbach, Alemannia Aachen).
- María Elena Carrera, 97, Chilean politician, senator (1969–1973, 1993–1998).
- Tomáš Čermák, 83, Czech engineer and rector of VSB – Technical University of Ostrava (1990–1997, 2003–2010).
- Grizz Chapman, 52, American actor (30 Rock), kidney disease.
- Charles Cioffi, 90, American actor (Klute, Shaft, All the Right Moves).
- Eldon Coombe, 85, Canadian curler, cancer.
- Franco De Piccoli, 88, Italian boxer, Olympic champion (1960).
- Jonathan L. Foote, 90, American architect, complications from Parkinson's disease.
- Israel Goodovitch, 92, Israeli architect.
- Sir Jeremy Hanley, 80, British politician, MP (1983–1997).
- Clarence B. Jones, 95, American lawyer and counsel.
- Dick van de Kaa, 93, Dutch demographer.
- Marjan Minnesma, 59, Dutch activist, founder of Urgenda, breast cancer.
- Luís Freire Neto, 69, Brazilian politician, Pernambuco MLA (1983–1987), deputy (1987–1989).
- Dick Parry, 83, English saxophonist (Pink Floyd).
- Emanuel Raasch, 70, German racing cyclist, tandem track world champion (1991).
- Benoist Rey, 87, French writer.
- Carl Schachter, 93, American music theorist.
- Alcides Sosa, 82, Paraguayan footballer (Olimpia, Guaraní, national team).
- Richard A. Tapia, 88, American mathematician.
- George Wyndham, 36, Sierra Leonean Paralympic table tennis player (2016).

=== 23 ===
- Philip Aaberg, 77, American pianist, pneumonia.
- Paul P. Bernstein, 91–92, American businessman.
- Toman Brod, 97, Czech historian, anti-communist dissident, and Holocaust survivor.
- Lino Carletto, 82, Italian racing cyclist.
- James Anthony Carmichael, 84, American musician and record producer, Grammy winner (1985).
- Ann Fox Chandonnet, 83, American poet.
- Linda Crutchfield-Bocock, 84, Canadian Olympic alpine skier (1964) and luger (1968).
- Eugene Cussons, 46, South African primatologist, director of Chimp Eden, paramotor crash.
- Parviz Ghelichkhani, 80, Iranian footballer (Taj, Persepolis, national team).
- Sir Aziz Hadeed, Antiguan businessman and politician, member of the Senate (2004–2009).
- Lucienne Hamon, 95, French actress (The Lovers, Ho!, Birgitt Haas Must Be Killed).
- Yusuf Hossain Humayun, 89, Bangladeshi politician, MP (1973–1979).
- Jens Kampmann, 89, Danish politician, MP (1966–1978), minister of public works and pollution control (1971–1973).
- Norbert Kartmann, 77, German politician, member (1982–2022) and president of the Landtag of Hesse (2003–2019).
- Tadateru Konoe, 87, Japanese humanitarian, president of the International Federation of Red Cross and Red Crescent Societies (2009–2017).
- Brian Large, 87, English opera director.
- Thérèse Liotard, 80, French actress (Viens chez moi, j'habite chez une copine, My Father's Glory, My Mother's Castle).
- Tom Lund, 75, Norwegian football player (Lillestrøm SK, national team) and manager (Lillestrøm SK).
- Trevor Meath, 82, English footballer (Walsall, Lincoln City).
- Charlie Moore, 72, American baseball player (Milwaukee Brewers, Toronto Blue Jays).
- Howard Moscoe, 86, Canadian politician, member of the Toronto City Council (1978–2010).
- William W. Parmley, 90, American cardiologist.
- Dang Van Phuoc, 90, Vietnamese-American photojournalist.
- Piotr Pyzik, 67, Polish politician, MP (2011–2019).
- Jan Renders, 88, Dutch footballer (PSV Eindhoven, GVAV, national team).
- Sergei Rozhkov, 83, Russian football player (Spartak Moscow, Soviet Union national team) and manager.
- Arleen Schloss, 82, American performance artist.
- Ruth Shack, 94, American politician and civil rights activist (Save Our Children).
- Lucile Saint-Simon, 93, French actress (Les Bonnes Femmes, The Hands of Orlac, Ravishing).
- Dame Jools Topp, 68, New Zealand Hall of Fame musician and comedian (Topp Twins), breast cancer.
- Friedhelm Wentzke, 90, German sprint canoeist, Olympic champion (1960).
- Albert Wolsky, 95, French-born American costume designer (All That Jazz, Bugsy, Revolutionary Road), Oscar winner (1980, 1992).

=== 24 ===
- Beverly Afaglo, 42, Ghanaian actress (The Game, A Northern Affair, Sidechic Gang) and television presenter.
- Jordi Amorós, 82, Spanish cartoonist and animator.
- S. L. Akshay, 39, Indian cricketer (Karnataka), heart attack.
- Zeudi Araya, 75, Eritrean actress (Mr. Robinson, Hearts and Armour, The Sinner) and film producer.
- Béatrice Bellamy, 59, French politician, MP (since 2022), cancer.
- John Claridge, 81, British photographer.
- John Eaton, 91, American jazz pianist.
- Manny Fernandez, 79, American football player (Miami Dolphins), Super Bowl champion (1973, 1974).
- Gary Foster, 89, American musician.
- Ioan Gherhard, 84, Romanian handball manager (Chimistul Râmnicu Vâlcea).
- Jonathan Harvey, 82, English cricketer (Cambridge University) and barrister.
- Mats Hellström, 84, Swedish politician, minister for foreign trade (1983–1986), minister of agriculture (1986–1991).
- Arturo Herviz Reyes, 71, Mexican politician, senator (2006–2012), heart attack.
- Mary Hooper, 81, British author.
- Tess Jaray, 88, British painter and printmaker, fall.
- Oval Jaynes, 85, American college football player (Appalachian State) and coach (Gardner–Webb).
- Samuel Tak Lee, 87, Hong Kong property developer.
- Liu Zaifu, 84, Chinese writer (Farewell to Revolution) and poet.
- Linda Masarira, 43, Zimbabwean politician and human rights activist.
- Frank McGuigan, 70, Northern Irish Gaelic footballer (Tyrone).
- William Hamilton Meeks, III, 78, American mathematician.
- Shyam Lal Meena, 61, Indian Olympic archer (1988).
- Mario Milano, 90, Italian Roman Catholic prelate, archbishop of Sant'Angelo dei Lombardi–Conza–Nusco–Bisaccia (1989–1998) and Aversa (1998–2011).
- Edvard Moseid, 81, Norwegian zoo director (Kristiansand Zoo and Amusement Park).
- Ján Plachetka, 81, Slovak chess grandmaster.
- Gil Rowntree, 92, Canadian Hall of Fame Thoroughbred racehorse trainer.
- Philippe Samyn, 77, Belgian architect, engineer and urbanist.
- Khizri Shikhsaidov, 78, Russian politician, speaker of the People's Assembly of the Republic of Dagestan (2013–2021).
- Ted White, 88, American author (Invasion from 2500) and editor (The Best from Amazing Stories, The Best from Fantastic).
- Timothy Yang, 83, Taiwanese diplomat, minister of foreign affairs (2009–2012) and secretary-general to the president (2012–2015).

=== 25 ===
- Paraskevas Antzas, 49, Greek footballer (Skoda Xanthi, Olympiacos, national team), complications from amyotrophic lateral sclerosis.
- Rene Belmonte, 55, Brazilian screenwriter (If I Were You, Novo Mundo, Federal Bank Heist).
- Raymond Berry, 93, American Hall of Fame football player (Baltimore Colts) and coach (New England Patriots, Detroit Lions).
- Romualdas Budrys, 92, Lithuanian art historian and museologist.
- Antônio Salim Curiati, 98, Brazilian politician, mayor of São Paulo (1982–1983) and deputy (1987–1991), and twice São Paulo MLA.
- Neale Daniher, 65, Australian football player (Essendon) and coach (Melbourne), co-founder of FightMND, complications from motor neurone disease.
- Florence Denmark, 94, American psychologist, president of APA (1980–1981).
- Pierre Deny, 69, French actor (Tomorrow Is Ours, The African Woman, Emily in Paris), complications from amyotrophic lateral sclerosis.
- Frankie Duarte, 71, American super bantamweight boxer (WBC), brain tumor.
- Stanley Michael Gartler, 102, American biologist.
- José António Gregório, 86, Portuguese Olympic wrestler (1960). (death announced on this date)
- Robin Hurlstone, 68, British actor (Fantastic Mr. Fox, The Grand Budapest Hotel) and art dealer.
- Brian Johnson, 86, British special effects film artist (The Empire Strikes Back, Alien, The NeverEnding Story), Oscar winner (1980, 1981).
- Esa Klinga, 86, Finnish Olympic skier (1964, 1968).
- Linda Mullins, 86, English greyhound racing trainer.
- Yoshihiro Nishimura, 59, Japanese film director (Helldriver, Mutant Girls Squad, Vampire Girl vs. Frankenstein Girl), cirrhosis.
- Ted Peirce, 92, Australian Olympic water polo player (1956, 1960, 1964).
- Russell M. Pitzer, 88, American chemist.
- Shereen Ratnagar, 82, Indian archaeologist.
- Flick Rea, 88, English politician, Camden Borough councillor (1986–2021).
- Sonny Rollins, 95, American jazz saxophonist ("Airegin", "Doxy", "St. Thomas").
- Kathryn Sessions, 84, American politician, member of the Wyoming Senate (1999–2011) and House of Representatives (1993–1998).
- Benjamin Swan, 92, American politician, member of the Massachusetts House of Representatives (1995–2017).
- Honoré Traoré, 68, Burkinabé general, head of state (2014).
- Victor Udoh, 21, Nigerian footballer (Royal Antwerp).

=== 26 ===
- Mark Bailey, 64, American baseball player (Houston Astros, San Francisco Giants), cancer.
- E. Bruce Brooks, 89, American sinologist.
- Gaël Da Silva, 41, French Olympic gymnast (2012), traffic collision.
- Robert Daley, 96, American writer, journalist and police officer.
- Theo Diegelmann, 86, German footballer (SSV Reutlingen 05, VfL Bochum, 1. FC Nürnberg).
- Sir Robin Gill, 98, British business, investor and television executive.
- Virginia Held, 96, American philosopher.
- Bob Horner, 68, American baseball player (Arizona State Sun Devils, Atlanta Braves, St. Louis Cardinals).
- Tony Ives, 74, English jockey. (death announced on this date)
- Marc Johnson, 49, American skateboarder.
- Tim Johnston, 63, American author, brain cancer.
- Elizabeth Lapovsky Kennedy, 86, American historian and academic.
- Forbes Kennedy, 90, Canadian ice hockey player (Philadelphia Flyers, Toronto Maple Leafs, Boston Bruins).
- Klaus Lehnertz, 88, German pole vaulter, Olympic bronze medalist (1964).
- R. Fred Lewis, 78, American judge, justice of the Supreme Court of Florida (1998–2019).
- Beth McKillop, 72, British sinologist and Koreanist, breast cancer.
- Dragoljub Mićunović, 95, Serbian politician, president of the chamber of citizens of the Federal Assembly of Yugoslavia (2000–2003) and the Assembly of Serbia and Montenegro (2003–2004).
- Donald Newhouse, 96, American mass media owner and publisher (Advance Publications), lymphoma.
- Peter Nobel, 94, Swedish human rights lawyer.
- Mohammed Odeh, 51–52, Palestinian militant, commander of Hamas in the Gaza Strip (since 2026), airstrike.
- Terry Don Phillips, 78, American college athletics administrator (Clemson Tigers).
- Renato Rosaldo, 85, American cultural anthropologist.
- Edoardo Rovida, 98, Italian Roman Catholic prelate, permanent observer of the Holy See to the UNOG (1981–1985), apostolic nuncio to Panama (1971–1977) and Switzerland (1985–1993).
- Rosi Sailer, 94, Australian Olympic alpine skier (1952).
- Alan Saret, 81, American postminimalist artist.
- William Smithers, 98, American actor (Dallas, Attack, Papillon).
- Howard Storm, 94, American actor (Take the Money and Run) and director (Mork & Mindy, Once Bitten).
- Koji Tanaka, 70, Japanese football player (NKK SC, national team) and manager (Matsue City), acute myeloid leukemia.
- Bjørn Tidmand, 86, Danish singer.
- Abdillah Toha, 84, Indonesian politician, MP (2004–2009).
- Neil V. Wake, 77, American jurist, judge of the U.S. District Court for the District of Arizona (since 2003).
- Arnold Whittall, 90, British musicologist.
- Samuel Yin, 75, Taiwanese conglomerate industry executive, founder of the Tang Prize.

=== 27 ===
- John Amari, 77, American politician, member of the Alabama House of Representatives (1978–1982) and Senate (1982–1998).
- Abdullah bin Hamad al-Attiyah, 73, Qatari politician, deputy prime minister (2003–2011).
- Steve Barrow, 80, British reggae producer and historiographer, co-founder of Blood and Fire.
- George Bork, 84, American Hall of Fame football player (Northern Illinois Huskies, Montreal Alouettes).
- Ilie Ciocan, 112, Romanian supercentenarian and World War II veteran.
- Owain Rhys Davies, 44, Welsh actor (Twin Peaks, Alice Through the Looking Glass, A Serial Killer's Guide to Life).
- Paul Dorpat, 87, American historian.
- Maureen Duffy, 92, English poet, playwright and novelist.
- Anik Dutta, 66, Indian film director (Bhooter Bhabishyat, Ashchorjyo Prodeep, Meghnad Badh Rahasya), fall.
- Giuseppe Gargani, 91, Italian politician, deputy (1972–1994) and MEP (1999–2009).
- Peter Giger, 87, Swiss percussionist and bandleader.
- George Kalmus, 91, British particle physicist.
- Marion Kozak, 91, Polish-born British activist.
- Marcia Lucas, 80, American film editor (Star Wars, Taxi Driver, American Graffiti), Oscar winner (1978), cancer.
- Caroline Marland, 80, British advertiser and newspaper managing director (The Guardian), traffic collision.
- Vladimir Matyukhin, 81, Russian army general.
- Jay Milder, 92, American painter, stroke.
- Chikadibia Isaac Obiakor, 75, Nigerian army general and United Nations force commander.
- Carlos Oliva, 61, Peruvian economist, director of the Central Reserve Bank (2015–2016, since 2021) and minister of economy and finance (2018–2019).
- Mamoru Ozaki, 91, Japanese bureaucrat.
- Sir Ralph Robins, 93, British businessman.
- Jim Rutt, 72, American businessman.
- Peter Schepull, 61, Swiss footballer (Servette, Wettingen, national team).
- Joe Schwarz, 88, American politician, member of the U.S. House of Representatives (2005–2007) and Michigan Senate (1987–2002).
- Randhir Singh, 79, Indian five-time Olympic shooter and sports administrator, secretary general of the IOA (1987–2012), and president of the OCA (2021–2026).

=== 28 ===
- Yitzhak Apeloig, 81, Uzbek-born Israeli computational chemist and scholar, president of Technion (2001–2009). (death announced on this date)
- Bashir Badr, 91, Indian poet.
- Anjanette Comer, 86, American actress (The Appaloosa, Guns for San Sebastian, Lepke), leukemia.
- Michael Dysart, 92, Australian architect.
- John Geyman, 95, American physician.
- Abdrabbuh Mansour Hadi, 80, Yemeni politician, president (2012–2022), vice president (1994–2012), and minister of defense (1994), heart attack.
- Dabirul Islam, 77, Bangladeshi politician, MP (1986–1987, 1991–1995, 1996–2024).
- Marie-Jo Lafontaine, 75, Belgian sculptor and video artist.
- Claude Lemieux, 60, Canadian ice hockey player (New Jersey Devils, Colorado Avalanche, Montreal Canadiens), four-time Stanley Cup champion, suicide by hanging.
- Gareth Loy, 80, American composer and mathematician.
- Alec Penstone, 101, British World War II veteran.
- Nemesio Pozuelo, 85, Russian footballer (Torpedo Moscow, Spartak Moscow, Zenit Saint Petersburg).
- Meta Ramsay, Baroness Ramsay of Cartvale, 89, Scottish intelligence officer and peer, member of the House of Lords (since 1996), cancer.
- James M. Redfield, 90–91, American academic.
- Armen Sarvazyan, 86, Armenian-American biophysicist.
- S. Sathyendra, 64, Indian actor (Sollamale, Kamaraj, Jail) and film director.
- Jevgenij Shuklin, 40, Lithuanian Olympic canoeist (2012) and politician, MP (since 2024).
- Carsten Smith, 93, Norwegian judge, chief justice of the Supreme Court (1991–2002).
- Straight Girl, Japanese racehorse, complications from surgery.
- Jim Treacy, 82, Irish hurler (Kilkenny, Bennettsbridge).
- Ellen Weston, 87, American actress (Another World, The Young and the Restless) and television writer (Guiding Light).

=== 29 ===
- John Basinger, 92, American actor (Children of a Lesser God).
- Carole Bellows, 91, American judge, president of the Illinois State Bar Association (1977–1978).
- Lauren Bennett, 36, English singer (G.R.L., "Party Rock Anthem"), suicide.
- Bryan Bergougnoux, 43, French football player (Tours, Toulouse) and manager (Thonon Evian).
- Bill Clapp, 84, American business executive and philanthropist, pneumonia.
- Bobby Crockett, 83, American football player (Buffalo Bills).
- Lőrinc Csernyus, 64, Hungarian architect.
- James R. Gibson, 91, Canadian historian and geographer.
- Phil Hay, 88, Australian footballer (Hawthorn).
- Charles Hinman, 93, American painter.
- Zacarias Kamwenho, 91, Angolan Roman Catholic prelate, archbishop of Lubango (1997–2009).
- Bruno Kant, 110, German supercentenarian and Roman Catholic priest.
- Larry King, 81, American tennis promoter, prostate cancer.
- T. U. Kuruvilla, 89, Indian politician, Kerala MLA (2006–2016).
- Arja Lehtinen, 90, Finnish Olympic gymnast (1952).
- Sir Hirini Moko Mead, 99, New Zealand Māori anthropologist and historian.
- Edgar Morin, 104, French philosopher (polycrisis).
- Mariella Mularoni, 63, Sammarinese politician, captain regent (2019–2020).
- Hemendra Singh Panwar, 89, Indian environmentalist.
- Gade Venkata Reddy, 86, Indian politician, Andhra Pradesh MLA (1967–1972, 1991–1999, 2004–2014).
- Michel Stievenard, 88, French footballer (Lens, Angers, national team).
- Jorge Alonso Treviño, 90, Mexican politician, governor of Nuevo León (1985–1991).
- Yoshiharu Yamaguchi, 83, Japanese rugby union player (national team), stroke.

=== 30 ===
- Billy Álvarez, 80, Mexican football executive, politician and convicted racketeer, president of Cruz Azul (1988–2020) and deputy (1994–1997).
- Rodney Atkinson, 78, British political and economic commentator and businessman.
- William Coupon, 73, American photographer, cancer.
- Paul Curtin, 71–72, Australian cricketer (South Australia, Northern Districts). (death announced on this date)
- Kelly Curtis, 69, American actress (The Devil's Daughter, Trading Places, False Arrest).
- B. S. Dhaliwal, 78, Indian Army general, heart attack.
- K. P. Dhanapalan, 76, Indian politician, MP (2009–2014).
- Gary Dunham, 75, American musician.
- John V. Fleming, 90, American literary scholar.
- París Galán, 58, Bolivian drag queen and politician.
- Jamshid Gharajedaghi, 88, Iranian-American business theorist.
- Héctor Maseda Gutiérrez, 83, Cuban nuclear engineer and journalist.
- Dennis Hull, 81, Canadian ice hockey player (Chicago Black Hawks, Detroit Red Wings).
- Knut Husebø, 80, Norwegian visual artist and actor (Life and Death, Julia Julia, Apprentice to Murder).
- Speight Jenkins, 89, American music director and critic.
- Norihiko Kitahara, 71, Japanese Olympic basketball player (1976).
- Josef Kovačič, 65, Czech footballer (TJ Škoda Plzeň).
- Julio Le Parc, 97, Argentine-French artist.
- Dieter Meinel, 76, German Olympic cross-country skier (1976).
- Josefina Molina, 89, Spanish film director (Esquilache, Teresa de Jesús), screenwriter, and television producer.
- Joe Negri, 99, American jazz guitarist, educator and actor (Mister Rogers' Neighborhood).
- Geoff Oakes, 88, English rugby league player (Wakefield Trinity, Warrington Wolves).
- Brooklyn Rivera, 73, Nicaraguan Miskito activist and politician, MP (2007–2023).
- Foster Sylvers, 64, American singer (The Sylvers), prostate cancer.
- Rick Treadway, 56, American racing driver (Indy Racing League), traffic collision.
- Jutta Zilliacus, 100, Finnish-Estonian politician, journalist and author, MP (1975–1987).

=== 31 ===
- Hugo Broch, 104, German World War II flying ace, last living recipient of the Knight's Cross of the Iron Cross.
- Rene Canent, 80, Filipino basketball player (Tanduay).
- Paul Courto, 68, Australian footballer (Hobart).
- Bruce P. Crandall, 93, American Army aviator, Medal of Honor recipient.
- Richard K. Davidson, 84, American railway executive, CEO of Union Pacific (1997–2007).
- Alan L. Gropman, 88, American Air Force colonel.
- Gu Songfen, 96, Chinese aircraft designer (Shenyang JJ-1, Shenyang J-8), member of the SCNPC (1993–2003), the Chinese Academy of Sciences and Chinese Academy of Engineering.
- Hasegawa Katsutoshi, 81, Japanese sumo wrestler.
- Hilde Lynn Helphenstein, 40, American art critic and influencer.
- Sven Henning, 85, Norwegian theatre director.
- Ru-Chih Chow Huang, 94, Taiwanese-American biologist.
- Suman Kalyanpur, 89, Indian playback singer (Bidesiya, Laagi Nahi Chhute Ram, Vidhana Naach Nachawe).
- John Kear, 71, English rugby league coach (Sheffield Eagles, Wakefield Trinity, Wales national team).
- Marko Koivuranta, 48, Finnish footballer (RoPS, FC Jazz, Oulu). (death announced on this date)
- Robert Kya-Hill, 95, American actor (Shaft's Big Score!, Sue, Death Wish).
- Sune Larsson, 95, Swedish cross-country skier.
- Cleo Littleton, 93, American basketball player (Wichita State Shockers).
- Curt Newsome, 67, American football coach (Virginia Tech Hokies, Emory and Henry Wasps).
- Vic Purvis, 82, American football player (Boston Patriots) and analyst (Southern Miss Golden Eagles), complications from Alzheimer's disease.
- Tomi Reichental, 90, Slovak-born Irish Holocaust survivor.
- Ryamizard Ryacudu, 76, Indonesian military officer and politician, minister of defence (2014–2019) and chief of staff (2002–2005).
- Hoyle Schweitzer, 93, American surfer and businessman.
- Jay Silva, 45, Angolan-born American mixed martial artist.
- Matthew Spender, 81, English sculptor and writer.
- Gerard Verschuuren, 80, Dutch biologist.
- François Vezin, 89, French philosopher and translator.
- Kai von Warburg, 58, German rower, world champion (1991), stroke.
- Dexter Wansel, 75, American keyboardist (MFSB), songwriter ("If Only You Knew"), and record producer ("Love T.K.O.").
- Stephen H. White, 86, American biophysicist.
- Anis Hassan Yahya, 91, Yemeni politician.
