= Mühe =

Mühe (German for "effort" or "toil") is a German surname. Notable people with the surname include:

- Anna Maria Mühe (born 1985), German actress
- Charlotte Mühe (1910–1981), German swimmer
- Erich Mühe (1938–2005), German surgeon
- Karl-Heinz Mühe (1949–2026), German politician
- Ulrich Mühe (1953–2007), German actor
