= Heinz-Helmich van Schewick =

German politician (1940–2026)

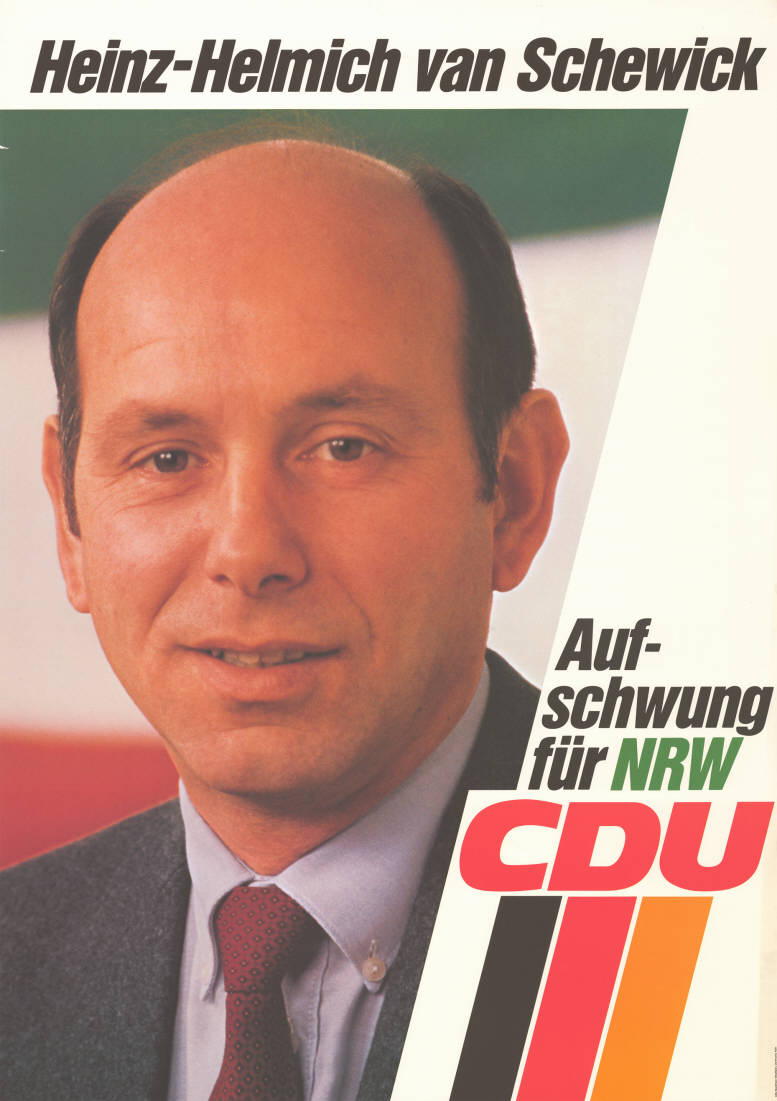
- Van Schewick campaign poster (1985)

Member of the Landtag of North Rhine-Westphalia
- In office 30 May 1985 – 1 June 2000

Personal details
- Born: 16 July 1940 Sonneberg, Gau Thuringia, Germany
- Died: 19 May 2026 (aged 85)
- Party: CDU
- Education: University of Bonn; University of Cologne
- Occupation: Psychologist

Heinz-Helmich van Schewick (16 July 1940 – 19 May 2026) was a German politician. A member of the Christian Democratic Union, he served in the Landtag of North Rhine-Westphalia from 1985 to 2000.

Van Schewick died on 19 May 2026, at the age of 85.
