= Pierre Sotura =

French politician (1930–2026)

Mayor of L'Île-Saint-Denis
- In office 21 March 1965 – 21 March 1971
- Preceded by: Arnold Géraux
- Succeeded by: Josiane Andros

Member of the General Council of Hauts-de-Seine for the Canton of Colombes-Nord-Ouest
- In office 30 September 1973 – 28 March 2004
- Succeeded by: Philippe Sarre

Personal details
- Born: 18 July 1930 Saint-Maurice, France
- Died: 19 May 2026 (aged 95)
- Party: PCF
- Occupation: Cabinetmaker

Pierre Sotura (French: [filˈip sˈaʁ]; 18 July 1930 – 19 May 2026) was a French politician of the French Communist Party (PCF).

A cabinetmaker by trade, he joined the Mouvement Jeunes Communistes de France in 1944 and worked as an editor for Avant-garde. From 1965 to 1971, he was mayor of L'Île-Saint-Denis and subsequently general councillor of Hauts-de-Seine for the Canton of Colombes-Nord-Ouest from 1973 to 2004.

Sotura died on 19 May 2026, at the age of 95.
