= Josef Kovačič =

Czech footballer (1961–2026)

Personal information
- Date of birth: 20 March 1961
- Place of birth: Czechoslovakia
- Date of death: 30 May 2026 (aged 65)
- Position: Forward

Youth career
- Spartak Chodov

Senior career*
Years	Team	Apps	(Gls)
–1982	RH Sušice		
1982–1991	Škoda Plzeň	202	(42)
1991–1995	FC Vilshofen		
1995–1997	Sokol Křimice		
- * Club domestic league appearances and goals

Josef Kovačič (20 March 1961 – 30 May 2026) was a Czech footballer who played as a forward.

== Career ==
Kovačič started his career at Spartak Chodov, before joining RH Sušice to complete his military service. In the spring of 1982, he joined Škoda Plzeň, where he spent nine seasons. In total, he played 202 matches for Škoda Plzeň, including 56 in the Czechoslovak First League.

He left Škoda Plzeň in 1991, where he joined FC Vilshofen in the German Landesliga. After four seasons in Germany, he returned to the Czech Republic, spending two years at Sokol Křimice.

== Personal life and death ==
Following his retirement, he ran a restaurant close to the Doosan Arena in Plzeň.

Kovačič died on 30 May 2026, at the age of 65, following a short illness.
