= Paul Schwartz (politician) =

Romanian Jewish community leader (1940–2026)

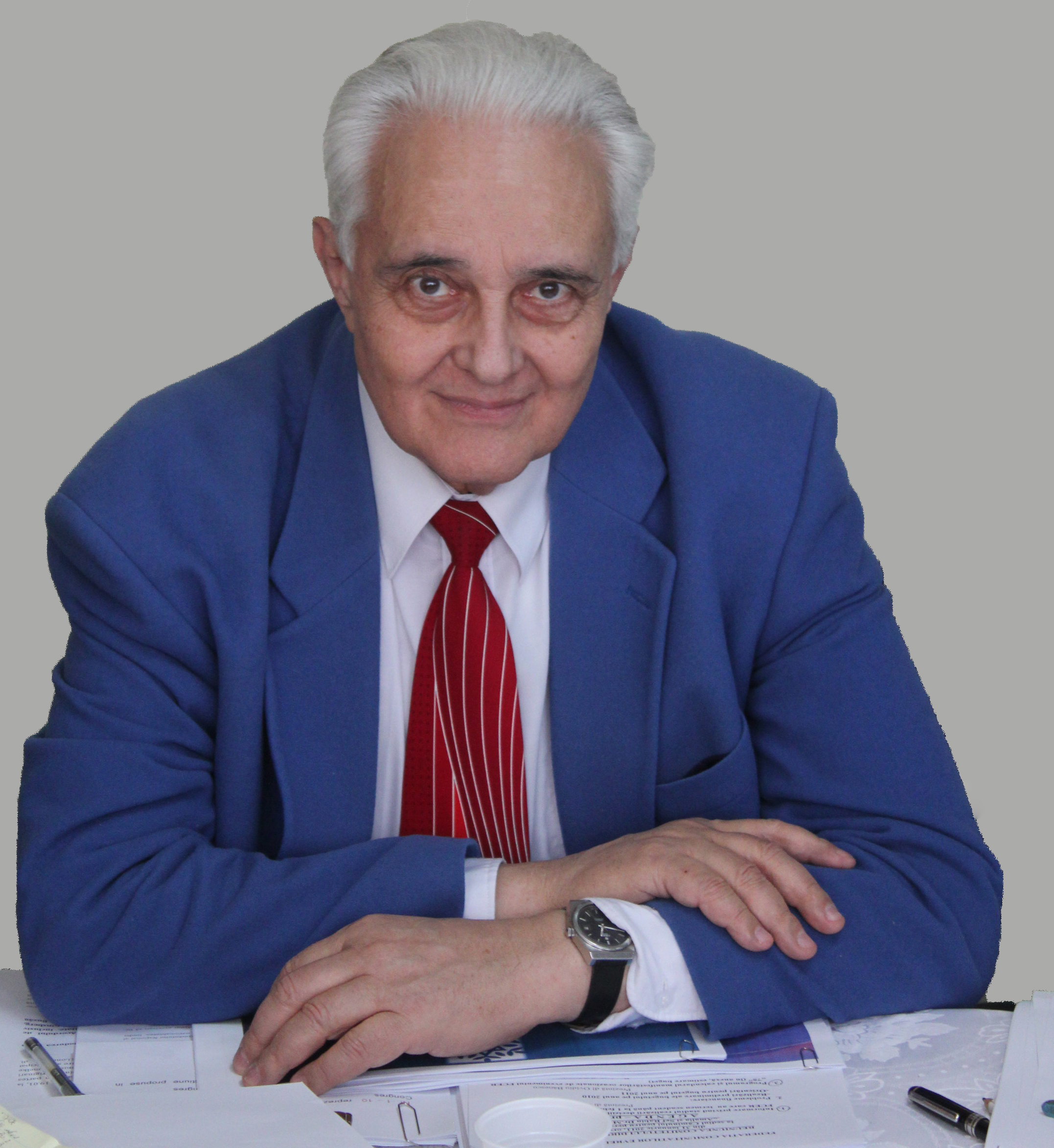
Paul Schwartz at his Jewish community office, Bucharest, Romania

Paul Schwartz (1 April 1940 – 3 May 2026) was a Romanian Jewish community leader. He served as the president of the Jewish community of Bucharest in Romania until his death. He was also the vice-president of the Federation of Jewish Communities of Romania, holding two mandates with the first starting in 2005.

== Biography ==
Paul Schwartz was born in Bucharest on 1 April 1940. He was a mechanical engineer and a developer of numerous trade patents for the former 23 August factory in Bucharest (renamed "FAUR" after the Romanian Revolution of 1989).

For his achievements in helping develop Romania from a technical and economical point of view, in 2009, Schwartz was decorated by the then President of Romania, Traian Băsescu, becoming a Knight of the Order of Industrial and Commercial Merit.

In January 2019, Mr. Paul Schwartz was decorated by President of Romania, Klaus Iohannis, as a Knight of the National Order of Faithful Service.

Schwartz was married in 1980 with professor Ana-Veronica Schwartz and had one son (Dr. Andrei Iosef Schwartz).

He died on 3 May 2026, at the age of 86.
