= Point Air =

French airline company

IATA	ICAO	Call sign
-	-	-
- Commenced operations: 1980
- Ceased operations: 1988
- Fleet size: 1 McDonnell Douglas DC-8
- Destinations: Marseille; Mulhouse/Basel; Ouagadougou
- Headquarters: Switzerland

Point Air was a French airline company operating a Douglas DC-8-63 on a route from Marseille and Mulhouse/Basel to Ouagadougou, Burkina Faso.

Point Air was famous for its low prices, before the age of low-cost airlines.

The airline started operations in 1980. Built on the remains of the French Antillan SATT (Société Antillaise de Transport Touristique), the Swiss-registered Point Air went into a politically enforced bankruptcy in 1988.
