= Luís Freire Neto =

Brazilian politician (1957–2026)

Member of the Chamber of Deputies of Brazil for Pernambuco
- In office 1 February 1987 – 1 January 1989

Member of the Legislative Assembly of Pernambuco
- In office 1 February 1983 – 31 January 1987

Personal details
- Born: Luís de Barros Freire Neto; 12 February 1957 Recife, Brazil
- Died: 22 May 2026 (aged 69) Brasília, Brazil
- Party: PMDB
- Education: University of Brasília
- Occupation: Architect

Luís de Barros Freire Neto (12 February 1957 – 22 May 2026) was a Brazilian politician. A member of the Brazilian Democratic Movement Party, he served in the Legislative Assembly of Pernambuco from 1983 to 1987 and in the Chamber of Deputies from 1987 to 1989.

Neto died in Brasília on 22 May 2026, at the age of 69.
