= Toyabali Ahmadali =

Surinamese politician (1931–2026)

Minister of Social Affairs
- In office 1969–1973
- Preceded by: August Biswamitre
- Succeeded by: André Soeperman

Personal details
- Born: 21 January 1931
- Died: 17 May 2026 (aged 95)
- Party: VHP
- Occupation: Civil servant

Toyabali Ahmadali (21 January 1931 – 17 May 2026) was a Surinamese politician. A member of the Progressive Reform Party, he served as Minister of Social Affairs from 1969 to 1973.

Ahmadali died on 17 May 2026, at the age of 95.
