= Benoist Rey =

French writer (1938–2026)

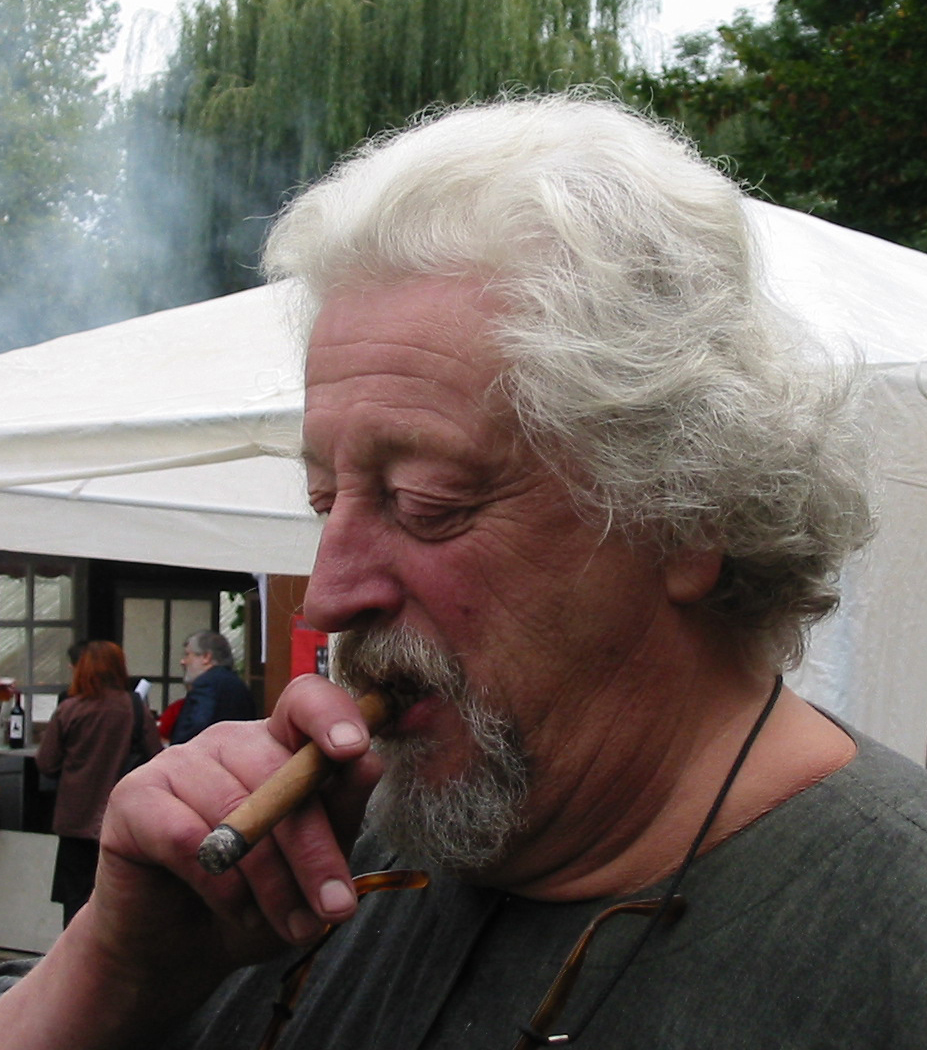
- Rey in 2003
- Born: 2 June 1938; Paris, France
- Died: 22 May 2026 (aged 87)
- Occupation: Writer

Benoist Rey (French: [bənwˈast ʁˈɛ]; 2 June 1938 – 22 May 2026) was a French writer.

A typesetter for Marchand, he served in the Algerian War and wrote a book on his traumatic experience, titled Les Égorgeurs. For this, he was the recipient of the 1999 Grand prix Ni Dieu ni maître.

Rey died on 22 May 2026, at the age of 87.
