= Rainer Lux =

German politician (1951–2026)

Member of the Landtag of North Rhine-Westphalia
- In office 1 June 1995 – 8 June 2010

Personal details
- Born: 3 March 1951 Arnsberg, North Rhine-Westphalia, West Germany
- Died: 11 May 2026 (aged 75)
- Party: CDU
- Education: Hochschule für Polizei und öffentliche Verwaltung Nordrhein-Westfalen
- Occupation: Criminal investigator

Rainer Lux (3 March 1951 – 11 May 2026) was a German politician. A member of the Christian Democratic Union, he served in the Landtag of North Rhine-Westphalia from 1995 to 2010.

Lux died on 11 May 2026, at the age of 75.
