= József Csapó =

Romanian politician (1938–2026)

Member of the Senate of Romania
- In office 22 October 1992 – 30 November 2000

Member of the Chamber of Deputies of Romania
- In office 18 June 1990 – 16 October 1992

Personal details
- Born: 8 May 1938 Târgu Secuiesc, Romania
- Died: 20 May 2026 (aged 88) Oradea, Romania
- Party: UDMR
- Education: Technical University of Cluj-Napoca
- Occupation: Engineer

József Csapó (8 May 1938 – 20 May 2026) was a Romanian politician. A member of the Democratic Union of Hungarians in Romania, he served in the Chamber of Deputies from 1990 to 1992 and in the Senate from 1992 to 2000.

Csapó died in Oradea on 20 May 2026, at the age of 88.
