= Howard Fendrich =

American sports journalist (1970–2026)

Howard Fendrich (September 16, 1970 – May 21, 2026) was an American journalist from Washington DC. He was a sports writer with the wire service, Associated Press for many years.

He died of cancer at Johns Hopkins Hospital in Baltimore, Maryland. He was married to Rosanna Maietta and had two sons, both sports journalists.

Fendrich covered tennis regularly from 2002 including 11 Olympic Games and Grand Slam tournaments. He also served as co-president of the International Tennis Writers Association (ITWA). Many present and former tennis stars, including Roger Federer, Billie Jean King, Rafael Nadal, Coco Gauff and Jessica Pegula, condoled his death. Commentator Patrick McEnroe also offered his condolences.

He was a graduate of Haverford College, near Philadelphia. Fendrich worked at AP for 33 years, starting as an unpaid intern in Rome. He started the AP's New York sports desk and moved to the Washington, D.C. area in 2005.

Fendrich died from cancer on May 21, 2026, at the age of 55.
