= Dominique Soltner =

French agronomic engineer (1936–2026)

- Born: 1 October 1936
- Died: 2 May 2026 (aged 89); Sainte-Gemmes-sur-Loire, France
- Education: École supérieure d'agricultures d'Angers
- Occupation: Agronomic engineer

Dominique Soltner (French: [dominˈik sɔltnˈe]; 1 October 1936 – 2 May 2026) was a French agronomic engineer.

Soltner also wrote and published books on agronomy intended for agricultural education. In 1978, he was responsible for the establishment of rural hedges on the ring road around Angers.

Soltner died in Sainte-Gemmes-sur-Loire on 2 May 2026, at the age of 89.

== Publications ==
- Les bases de la production végétale
- Guide la nouvelle agriculture: l'agriculture sur sol vivant ou "de conservation"
- Bandes enherbées et autres dispositifs bocagers
- Aujourd'hui les composts
- La reproduction des animaux d'élevage
- Alimentation des animaux domestiques
- Planter des haies
- L'arbre et la haie. Pour la production agricole, pour l'équilibre écologique et le cadre de vie rurale
- Agroécologie : guide de la nouvelle agriculture. Sans labour, avec couverts, légumineuses et rotations
