= El Cabrero (singer) =

Spanish flamenco singer (1944–2026)

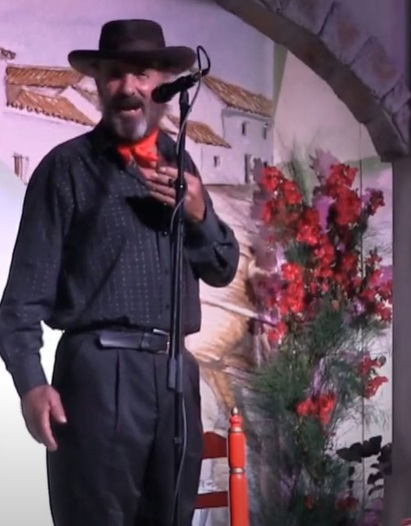
- El Cabrero in 2016
- Born: José Domínguez Muñoz; 19 October 1944; Aznalcóllar, Spain
- Died: 13 May 2026 (aged 81); Seville, Spain
- Occupation: Singer

José Domínguez Muñoz (19 October 1944 – 13 May 2026), better known by the stage name El Cabrero, was a Spanish flamenco singer.

== Life and career ==
Born in Aznalcóllar on 19 October 1944, Domínguez grew up as a goat farmer, which he continued to practice even after his rise to prominence as a singer. He began his artistic career in 1972 when he joined the group La Cuadra and began touring across Spain and broader Europe. In 1975, he released his first album and was honored at the Concurso Nacional de Arte Flamenco. Aside from his musical career, he also engaged in politics, participating in anarchist and left-libertarian groups.

El Cabrero died in Seville on 13 May 2026, at the age of 81.

== Discography ==
- Diálogo sin artificios
- Sin Remache
- Como el viento de poniente
- Por la huella del fandango
- De La Cuadra a La Carbonería
- Encina y cobre
- Le sigo cantando a Huelva
- Dale alas
- Que corra de boca en boca
- Luz de luna
- A mí me llaman Cabrero
- A paso lento
- Tierras duras
- A esta tierra que es mi mare
- Así canta El Cabrero
- Por los caminos del viento
- Paris 94 Live
- Pastor de Nubes
