= Metronade =

American social media influencer (2003–2026)

- Born: Roger Elliot Moore; 2002 or 2003; New York City, New York
- Died: May 11, 2026 (aged 23)
- Years active: 2020–2026

Roger Elliot Moore (2002 or 2003 – May 11, 2026), known online as Metronade, was a social media influencer known for his comedy sketches and video gaming clips.

== Life and career ==
Moore was born in New York City. Metronade was a content creator who made skit and gaming videos online. He grew an online following by creating comedy sketches, anime-related content, video gaming clips, and cinematic skits that often reflected real-life struggles. Metronade frequently participated in charity events.

== Personal life ==
Metronade graduated from Syracuse University in 2024 with a degree in Film from the College of Visual and Performing Arts. While at the university, he was instrumental in the establishment of the university's Center for the Creator Economy, with university publications later describing him as a "blueprint" for the program's founding.

== Death ==
On May 11, 2026, Metronade died in an accident at age 23. His death was initially announced on social media through his accounts. New York City's Office of the Chief Medical Examiner confirmed the cause of death to be an accident of blunt force trauma. Syracuse University's Center for the Creator Economy paid tribute to Metronade in a separate Instagram post, referring to him as "an alumnus, artist, and friend."
