= Jonathan Harvey (cricketer) =

English cricketer and barrister (1944–2026)

Personal information
- Full name: Jonathan Robert William Harvey
- Born: 3 February 1944; Yeovil, Somerset, England
- Died: 24 May 2026 (aged 82)
- Batting: Right-handed
- Bowling: Right-arm fast-medium

Domestic team information
- Years: Team
- 1963–1965: Cambridge University

Career statistics
Competition	First-class
Matches	6
Runs scored	5
Batting average	0.83
100s/50s	0/0
Top score	3
Balls bowled	1078
Wickets	17
Bowling average	25.35
5 wickets in innings	1
10 wickets in match	0
Best bowling	5/28
Catches/stumpings	1/–
- Source: Cricinfo, 25 May 2020

Jonathan Robert William Harvey (3 February 1944 – 24 May 2026) was an English first-class cricketer who played for Cambridge University from 1963 to 1965.

== Biography ==
Jonathan Harvey attended Marlborough College, where he captained the First XI, before going up to Christ's College, Cambridge. An opening bowler, he gained his blue in 1965. His best first-class figures were 5 for 28 against Somerset in 1965, in a match that Somerset nevertheless won by an innings. He took 3 for 47 and 4 for 78 against Glamorgan a week later. The next match was the University Match, in which he took three wickets and took part in an unbroken tenth-wicket partnership with Rupert Roopnaraine that yielded no runs but prevented defeat.

He became a barrister in London.

Harvey died on 24 May 2026, aged 82.
