= Abba Anas Adamu =

Nigerian politician (1956–2026)

Abba Anas Adamu (30 June 1956 – May 2026) was a Nigerian politician. He was elected to the House of Representatives of Nigeria in 2007.
