= Sivaramakichenane Somasegar =

Microsoft software executive

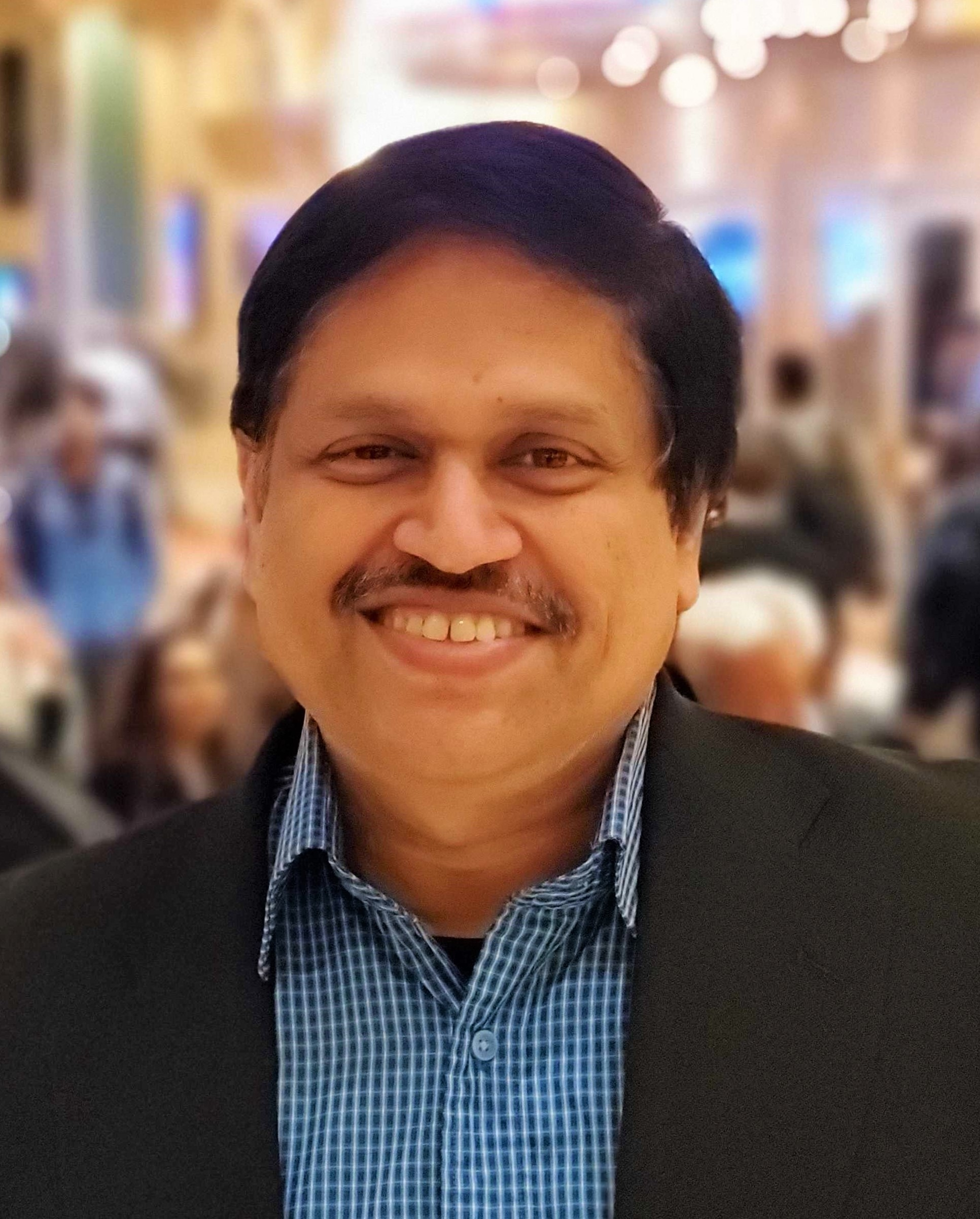
- Born: August 13, 1966; Puducherry, India
- Died: May 19, 2026 (aged 59)
- Other name: S. Somasegar
- Occupation: Technology businessperson

Sivaramakichenane "Soma" Somasegar (born August 13, 1966 in Puducherry, India, died May 19, 2026) was a Microsoft software executive and investment executive at Madrona Venture Group. He was a founding owner of the Seattle Orcas professional cricket team.

He joined Microsoft in 1989, headed Microsoft's Developer Division from December 2003, and announced he was leaving Microsoft in 2015.

He graduated with a Bachelor’s degree in Electronics and Communications Engineering from Anna University's College of Engineering, Guindy, Madras in 1986 and an MS in Electrical Engineering from Louisiana State University, Baton Rouge in 1988.

He died May 19, 2026 aged 59.
