= Rubem Medina =

Brazilian politician (1942–2026)

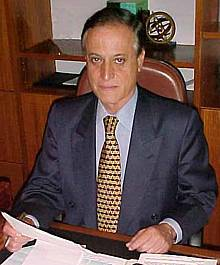

Member of the Chamber of Deputies of Brazil
- In office 1 February 1967 – 31 January 2003
- Constituency: Guanabara (1967–1975); Rio de Janeiro (1975–2003)

Personal details
- Born: 1 September 1942 Rio de Janeiro, Brazil
- Died: 14 May 2026 (aged 83) Rio de Janeiro, Brazil
- Party: MDB; PDS; PFL; PRN
- Education: Guanabara State University
- Occupation: Economist

Rubem Medina (1 September 1942 – 14 May 2026) was a Brazilian politician. A member of multiple political parties throughout his career, he served in the Chamber of Deputies from 1967 to 2003.

Medina died in Rio de Janeiro on 14 May 2026, at the age of 83.
