= Stanisław Rakowicz =

Polish politician (1935–2026)

Voivode of Toruń
- In office 1988–1990
- Preceded by: Stanisław Trokowski
- Succeeded by: Andrzej Tyc

Personal details
- Born: 20 September 1935 Kotuszów, Poland
- Died: 14 May 2026 (aged 90) Toruń, Poland
- Party: PZPR
- Education: Nicolaus Copernicus University in Toruń
- Occupation: Business manager

Stanisław Rakowicz (20 September 1935 – 14 May 2026) was a Polish politician. A member of the Polish United Workers' Party, he served as Voivode of Toruń Voivodeship from 1988 to 1990.

Rakowicz died in Toruń on 14 May 2026, at the age of 90.
