= Kevin Ndjomo =

Cameroonian sports journalist (died 2026)

Kevin Njomo
- Born: Kumba, British Cameroon
- Died: 9 May 2026; Bafoussam, Cameroon
- Education: St. Joseph's College, Sasse
- Occupation: Sports journalist

Kevin Njomo (died 9 May 2026) was a Cameroonian sports journalist.

== Life and career ==
Born in Kumba, Njomo attended St. Joseph's College, Sasse. He first entered journalism shortly after Cameroon's independence, joining Cameroon Radio Television (CRTV) and contributing to the development of English-language coverage in the country. He rose through the ranks of CRTV, managing numerous stations primarily based in Buea. He specialized in football coverage, following national and international competitions involving Cameroon. Towards the end of his career, he established a digital platform dedicated to sharing historical audiovisual sports content. On 8 September 2017, he was appointed to the normalization committee of the Cameroonian Football Federation.

Ndjomo died in Bafoussam on 9 May 2026.
