= Mbemba Jatta =

Gambian politician (died 2026)

Member of the House of Representatives of the Gambia
- In office 4 May 1982 – 22 July 1994

Personal details
- Born: Gunjur, British Gambia
- Died: 11 May 2026 New York City, U.S.
- Party: PPP

Mbemba Jatta (died 11 May 2026) was a Gambian politician. A member of the People's Progressive Party, he served in the House of Representatives from 1982 to 1994.

Jatta died in New York City on 11 May 2026.
