= Harold K. Brown =

American civil rights leader (1934–2026)

- Born: May 6, 1934; York, Pennsylvania, U.S.
- Died: May 6, 2026 (aged 92)
- Education: Fordham University; Penn State University; San Diego State University
- Occupation: Civil rights leader

Harold Kenneth Brown (May 6, 1934 – May 6, 2026) was an American civil rights leader in San Diego, California. He graduated from San Diego State University (SDSU) in 1959 and became the first African American to hold administrative rank at the university. He founded chapters of the Congress for Racial Equality and was arrested repeatedly for protesting against racial discrimination. In 2011, SDSU inaugurated the "Harold K. Brown Civil Rights and African American Experience Collection" - a historical collection from the civil rights movement, consisting of thousands of photographs, documents and oral accounts, many from Brown's personal collection. In 2016, he was interviewed for the national Civil Rights History Project, a national initiative of the Library of Congress's American Folklife Center and the National Museum of African American History and Culture to record interviews with freedom rights activists. Brown died on May 6, 2026, at the age of 92.
