= Heinrich Kofler =

Austrian politician (1930–2026)

Member of the Landtag of Vorarlberg
- In office 4 February 1981 – 5 November 1984
- In office 4 November 1974 – 2 January 1980

Personal details
- Born: 23 March 1930 Ritten, Italy
- Died: 6 May 2026 (aged 96) Lustenau, Vorarlberg, Austria
- Party: ÖVP
- Education: University of Innsbruck (Dr. jur.)
- Occupation: Tax officer

Heinrich Kofler (23 March 1930 – 6 May 2026) was an Austrian politician. A member of the Austrian People's Party, he served in the Landtag of Vorarlberg from 1974 to 1980 and again from 1981 to 1984.

Kofler died in Lustenau on 6 May 2026, at the age of 96.
