= Michael Oyedokun =

Murdered Nigerian schoolteacher (1968–2026)

Michael Oyedokun (September 26, 1968 – May 17, 2026) was a Nigerian schoolteacher who was murdered following his abduction by armed bandits from a government school in Oriire Local Government Area of Oyo State, Nigeria. Oyedokun was kidnapped together with six other teachers and scores of young students in coordinated armed attacks that happened on May 15 across three schools in Ahoro-Esinele and Yawota villages near Ogbomoso. The schools were L. A. Primary School, Esinele; Baptist Nursery and Primary School, Yawota; and Community Grammar School, Ahoro-Esinele, where Oyedokun was a mathematics teacher.

After the abduction, the victims were taken into some location in the forest of the Old Oyo National Park, from where the kidnappers released recorded videos of some of the abducted teachers pleading with the Oyo state government and Nigerian federal government to negotiate with their abductors for their ransom. Two days after the kidnapping, Oyedokun was brutally murdered by the kidnappers who released a video of his beheading.

The abduction and the murder of Oyedokun sparked mass grief and popular outrage amongst Nigeria across various mass media. Oyedokun's widow pleaded for the recovery of his remains for burial, and his family appealed to the public to stop sharing the traumatising video on social media and other platforms. The Pentecostal Fellowship of Nigeria condemned the abduction and Oyedokun’s decapitation. The incidents led to the closure of several schools across Oyo State owing to public panic and apprehension. Some teachers in Ogbomoso also shut down classroom activities, staging a peaceful protest. Following the attacks and killings, the Oyo State Government directed that all school excursions, field trips, sports competitions, and all student activities that require movement outside school premises across the every public and private schools in the state be immediately suspended. over rising security concerns. Some commentators argued that the gruesome murder of Oyedokun is a pointer to the collapse of rural security in Nigeria.
