= Melo Freire =

Brazilian politician (1927–2026)

Member of the Chamber of Deputies of Brazil for Minas Gerais
- In office 1 February 1975 – 31 January 1991

Member of the Brazilian Constituent Assembly
- In office 1 February 1987 – 22 July 1988

Personal details
- Born: Joaquim de Melo Freire; 11 January 1927 Passos, Minas Gerais, Brazil
- Died: 8 May 2026 (aged 99) Belo Horizonte, Minas Gerais, Brazil
- Party: ARENA; PMDB
- Education: Federal University of Minas Gerais
- Occupation: Economist

Joaquim de Melo Freire (11 January 1927 – 8 May 2026) was a Brazilian politician. A member of the National Renewal Alliance and the Brazilian Democratic Movement Party, he served in the Chamber of Deputies from 1975 to 1991.

Freire died in Belo Horizonte on 8 May 2026, at the age of 99.
