= Johannes Müller (politician, born 1969) =

German politician (1969–2026)

Member of the Landtag of Saxony
- In office 19 October 2004 – 29 September 2014

Personal details
- Born: 22 March 1969 Dresden, East Germany
- Died: 20 May 2026 (aged 57)
- Party: NPD
- Education: Humboldt University of Berlin; TU Dresden
- Occupation: Doctor

Johannes Müller (22 March 1969 – 20 May 2026) was a German politician. A member of the National Democratic Party, he served in the Landtag of Saxony from 2004 to 2014.

Müller died on 20 May 2026, at the age of 57.
