= Ole Wøhlers Olsen =

Danish diplomat (1942–2026)

Ole Wøhlers Olsen (27 January 1942 – 19 May 2026) was a Danish diplomat who was Ambassador to Algeria.

== Life and career ==
Olsen, a practicing Muslim, was employed by Denmark's Foreign Ministry from 1969. He served in Morocco, Algeria, Saudi Arabia, Rwanda, Chile and Peru. In 1993, he completed a bicycle pilgrimage to Mecca.

The Danish government strongly supported the US-led invasion of Iraq, 2003, and in what was seen as recognition of the Scandinavian country's support for the coalition, Olsen was appointed to the position as coordinator for one of the four US-led provisional authorities, that in Southern Iraq, stationed in Basra. The other three coordinators were Americans. Olsen, however, criticised his U.S. superiors in Baghdad for the lack of support for his reconstruction efforts, and for providing him with too little assistance, for instance on security back-up. He was suddenly replaced on 28 July, three and a half months before his contract was due to end. He then returned to his former posting in Damascus as the Danish ambassador to Syria.

After Syria, he returned to Denmark, where he worked at the Danish Institute of International Studies for one year as a senior consultant. In 2006, he was sent on his latest posting; as the Danish ambassador to Algeria.

Olsen died in May 2026, at the age of 84.
