= Serigne Ibrahima Mahmoud Cissé =

Senegalese teacher and religious guide (1952–2026)

- Born: 1952
- Died: 18 May 2026 (aged 73–74); Diamal, Senegal
- Occupations: Teacher; Religious guide

Serigne Ibrahima Mahmoud Cissé (1952 – 18 May 2026) was a Senegalese teacher and religious guide.

Cissé taught traditional Arab and Islamic traditions in Senegalese schools in a role known as daara. He was the traditional school leader in the rural community of Diamal, teaching in a Majlis. Throughout his career, he distinguished himself as a poet and religious mentor, teaching numerous ulama across West Africa.

Cissé died in Diamal on 18 May 2026.
