= José Adriano Gago Vitorino =

Portuguese politician (1945–2026)

Secretary of State for Emigration and the Portuguese Communities
- In office 8 September 1981 – 9 June 1983
- Prime Minister: Francisco Pinto Balsemão
- Preceded by: Manuela Aguiar
- Succeeded by: Manuela Aguiar

Member of the Assembly of the Republic of Portugal for Faro
- In office 3 June 1976 – 12 August 1985

Personal details
- Born: 1945 Faro, Portugal
- Died: 11 May 2026 (aged 80–81) Faro, Portugal
- Party: PSD
- Education: Lisbon School of Economics and Management
- Occupation: Engineer

José Adriano Gago Vitorino (1945 – 11 May 2026) was a Portuguese politician. A member of the Social Democratic Party, he served in the Assembly of the Republic from 1976 to 1985 and was Secretary of State for Emigration and the Portuguese Communities from 1981 to 1983.

Vitorino died in Faro on 11 May 2026.
