= Teet Veispak =

Estonian historian (1955–2026)

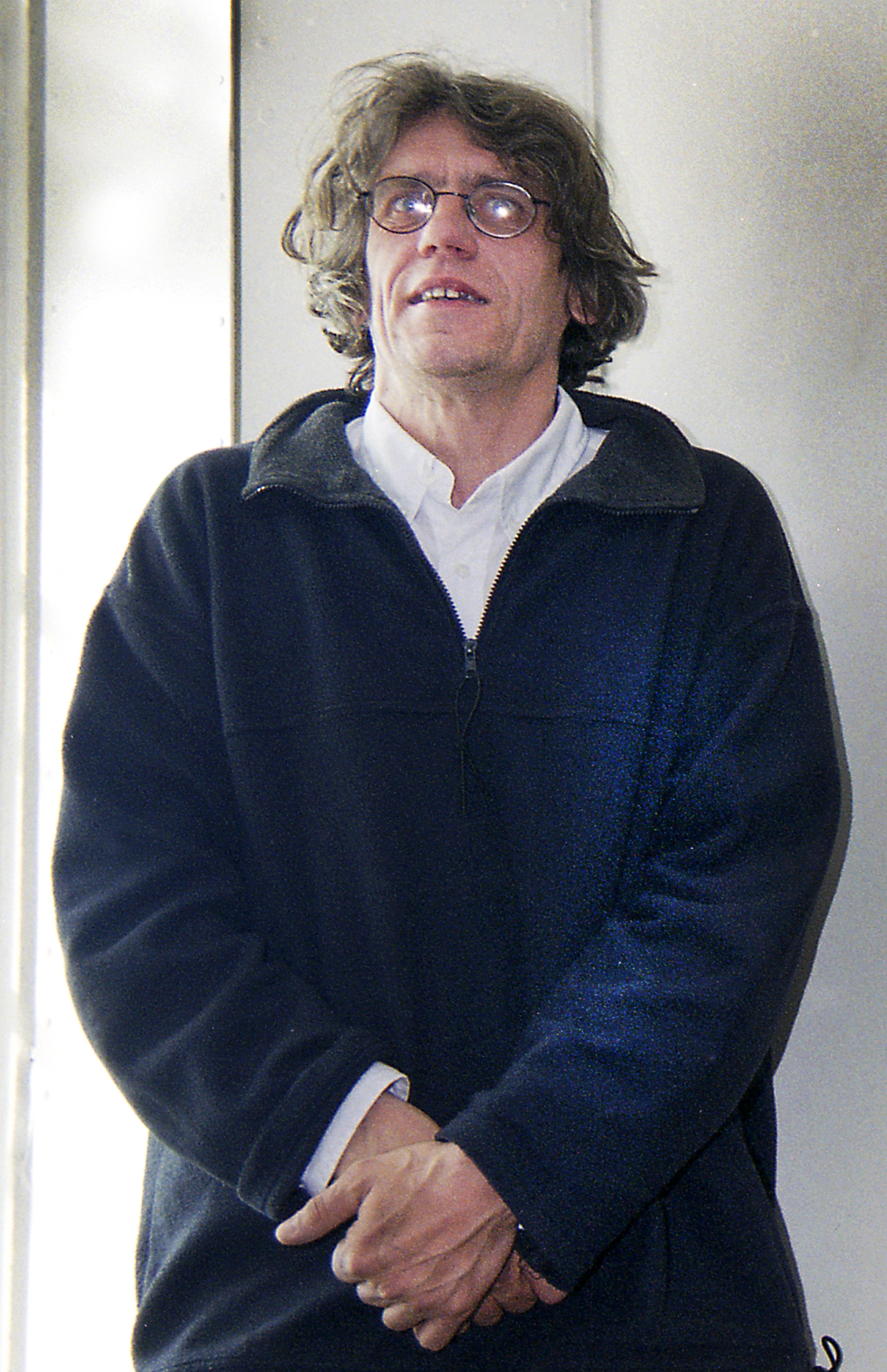
- Veispak in 2001
- Born: 25 September 1955
- Died: 20 May 2026 (aged 70)
- Occupations: Historian; academic

Teet Veispak (25 September 1955 – 20 May 2026) was an Estonian historian and cultural figure.

== Education ==
Veispak graduated from Tartu State University's Faculty of History in 1979.

== Work ==
Veispak worked as a researcher and the director of the Institute of History of the Academy of Sciences of the Estonian SSR, as a researcher, an exhibition organizer, and the research director of the Rakvere Museum, and as the curator of exhibitions at the Kalame Farm Museum of Virumaa Museums.

== Death ==
Veispak died on 20 May 2026, at the age of 70.

== Bibliography ==
- 1983: "Väitekiri Tallinna 18. sajandi rahvastikust: C. J. Kenézi doktoriväitekirjast Beiträge zur Bevölkerungsstruktur von Reval in den zweiten Hälfte des 18. Jahrhunderts (1754–1804)" (A Dissertation on the Population of Tallinn in the 18th Century: C. J. Kenéz's Doctoral Dissertation Beiträge ...). Eesti NSV Teaduste Akadeemia Toimetised. Ühiskonnateadused 32(1).
- 1988: Lübeck ja Venezia (Lübeck and Venice). Tallinn: Perioodika.
- 1990: "Ajalooteadusest kui venestuse ideoloogia kandjaist (1944–1952)" (On the Discipline of History as a Vehicle of Russian Ideology, 1944–1952). Looming 9: 1260–1268.

== Awards and recognitions ==
- 2000: Surprise Award of the Lääne-Viru County expert group of the Cultural Endowment of Estonia
- 2001: Cultural Endowment of Estonia annual award for visual and applied arts (promoting the artistic life of Rakvere and organizing the KanaNahk festival)
