= Csaba Takács =

Romanian politician (1955–2026)

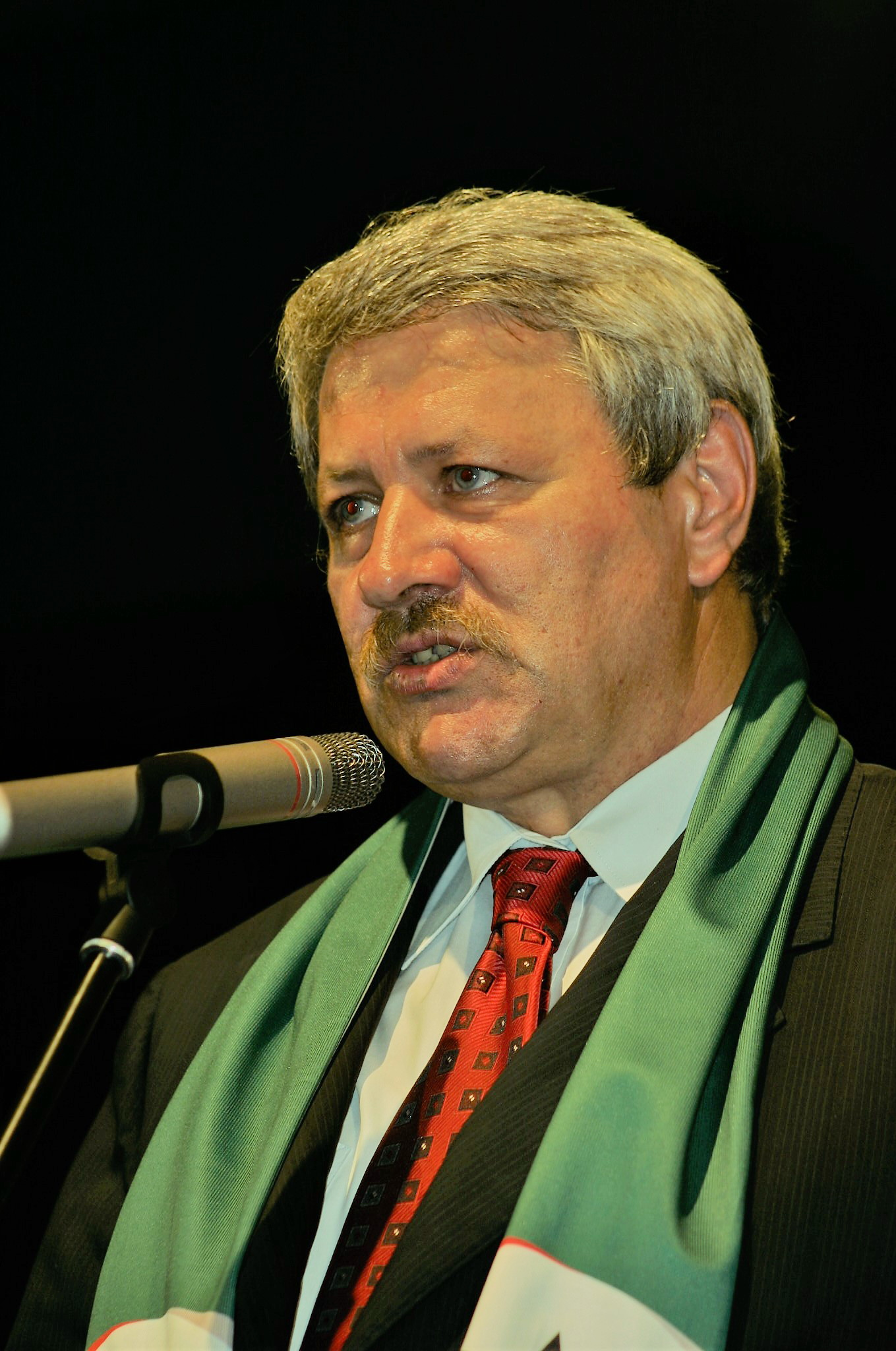
- Takács in 2017

Member of the Chamber of Deputies of Romania for Hunedoara County
- In office 18 June 1990 – 14 March 1994
- Succeeded by: Zoltán Fekete

Personal details
- Born: Csaba Albert Takács; 30 March 1955 Aiud, Romania
- Died: 1 May 2026 (aged 71) Aluniș, Romania
- Party: UDMR
- Occupation: Engineer

Csaba Albert Takács (30 March 1955 – 1 May 2026) was a Romanian politician. A member of the Democratic Union of Hungarians in Romania, he served in the Chamber of Deputies from 1990 to 1994.

Takács died in Aluniș on 1 May 2026, at the age of 71.
