= Shin'ichirō Tawata =

Japanese linguist (1947–2026)

- 多和田 眞一郎
- Born: 1947; Okinawa Prefecture, Japan
- Died: 15 May 2026 (aged 78)
- Citizenship: Japanese
- Education: Shizuoka University; Tokyo Metropolitan University
- Awards: Okinawa Study Encouragement Prize (1994); Kinjō Chōei Award (1984); Shinmura Izuru Prize (2021)

Shin'ichirō Tawata (Japanese: 多和田 眞一郎, Tawata Shin'ichirō, 1947 – 15 May 2026) was a Japanese linguist who specialised in Japanese linguistics and historical linguistics. He was a professor emeritus at Hiroshima University.

== Life and career ==
Tawata was born in 1947 in Okinawa Prefecture, and raised in Ginowan. He graduated from the Faculty of Humanities at Shizuoka University in 1970. He then entered Tokyo Metropolitan University, where he completed his master's program in Humanities in 1972 and advanced to the doctoral program. In 1973, he studied abroad at the Korean Language Institute of Yonsei University in South Korea. He withdrew from the doctoral program at Tokyo Metropolitan University in 1978 after completing the required course credits. In 1995, he obtained a PhD (Academic) with his dissertation, Foreign Sources-Based Historical Study on the Phonetics and Phonology of the Okinawan Language.

He worked as a lecturer at the Japanese Language School for Foreign Students attached to the Tokyo University of Foreign Studies. In 1985, he became an associate professor in the Faculty of Education at Hiroshima University, and was promoted to full professor in 1990, serving within the International Student Center and the Graduate School of Education. He retired and was granted the title of professor emeritus in 2012.

Throughout his career, Tawata received several major accolades for his dialectological research. In 1984, he won the Kinjō Chōei Award from the Okinawa Cultural Association for his historical studies on Ryukyuan phonology. In 1994, he was awarded the Okinawa Study Encouragement Prize by the Okinawa Association for his research on historical Korean records related to Okinawa. In 2021, he received the prestigious Shinmura Izuru Prize for his monograph, Historical Study on the Morphological Changes of Okinawan Verbs.

Tawata died from pancreatic cancer on 15 May 2026, at the age of 78.

== Selected publications ==
- A Study of the "Ryūkyū Luzon Hyōkaeroku": Customs and Language of Ryukyu and Luzon Two Hundred Years Ago (「琉球・呂宋漂海録」の研究 二百年前の琉球・呂宋の民俗・言語), Musashino Shoin, 1994.
- A Historical Study of the Phonetics and Phonology of the Okinawan Language Centered on Foreign Materials (外国資料を中心とする沖縄語の音声・音韻に関する歴史的研究), Musashino Shoin, 1997.
- A Study of Chinese Character Materials in the Okinawan Language (沖縄語漢字資料の研究), Keisuishe, 1998.
- A Historical Study of Okinawan Phonology (沖縄語音韻の歴史的研究), Keisuisha, 2010.
- Thinking About Changes in the Okinawan Language Through Toponyms: For Example, How "Zerikaku" (Jichaku) Became "Jicchaku" (地名で考える沖縄語の移り変り 例えば、「ぜりかく」（勢理客）が「じっちゃく」になるまで), Keisuisha, 2012.
- A Historical Study on the Morphological Changes of Okinawan Verbs (沖縄語動詞形態変化の歴史的研究 武蔵野書院創業百周年記念出版), Musashino Shoin, 2019.

=== Co-authored & Edited ===
- Departure for Japanese (にほんごへのたびだち), Kindai Bungeisha, 1993.
- System and Structure of Language (言語の体系と構造), Lecture Series on Japanese Language Education Vol. 6, 3A Network, 2006.

== See also ==
- Ryukyuan languages
- Okinawan language
