= Ladislav Skula =

Czech mathematician (1937–2026)

Ladislav "Ladja" Skula (30 June 1937 – 13 May 2026) was a Czech mathematician. His work spanned across topology, algebraic number theory, and the theory of ordered sets. He published over 80 papers and notable results on the Fermat quotient.

Skula obtained his Dr.Sc. degree from Charles University in Prague with a thesis on "obor Algebra a teorie čísel" (On Algebra and Number Theory). In 1991, he was appointed professor at the Masaryk University in Brno, where he was emeritus professor.

Skula died on 13 May 2026, at the age of 88.

== Selected publications ==
- Agoh, Takashi; Dilcher, Karl; Skula, Ladislav (1997). "Fermat quotients for composite moduli". Journal of Number Theory. 66: 29–50. doi:10.1006/jnth.1997.2162.
- Agoh, Takashi; Dilcher, Karl; Skula, Ladislav (1998). "Wilson quotients for composite moduli". Mathematics of Computation. 67 (222). AMS: 843–861. Bibcode:1998MaCom..67..843A. doi:10.1090/S0025-5718-98-00951-X.
- Kureš, Miroslav; Skula, Ladislav (2011). "Reduction of matrices over orders of imaginary quadratic field". Linear Algebra and Its Applications. 435 (6). AMS: 1903–1919. doi:10.1016/j.laa.2011.03.037.
- Agoh, Takashi; Skula, Ladislav (1996). "Kummer type congruences and Stickelberger subideals" (PDF). Acta Arithmetica. 75 (3). Institute of Mathematics Polish Academy of Sciences: 235–250. doi:10.4064/aa-75-3-235-250.
- Skula, Ladislav (1996). "On a special ideal contained in the Stickelberger ideal". Journal of Number Theory. 8: 173–195. doi:10.1006/jnth.1996.0073.
- Skula, Ladislav (1998). "Involutions for matrices and generalized inverses". Linear Algebra and Its Applications. 271 (1–3): 283–308. doi:10.1016/S0024-3795(97)00280-2.
