= John Geyman =

American physician

John P. Geyman (1931 - 28 May 2026) was an American physician. He was Professor Emeritus of Family Medicine at the University of Washington School of Medicine. He was the founding editor of The Journal of Family Practice.
