= Lőrinc Csernyus =

Hungarian architect (1961–2026)

- Born: 7 June 1961; Budapest, Hungary
- Died: 29 May 2026 (aged 64)
- Education: Budapest University of Technology and Economics
- Occupation: Architect

Lőrinc Csernyus (7 June 1961 – 29 May 2026) was a Hungarian architect. A member of the Hungarian Academy of Arts, he was a recipient of the Hungarian Knight Cross of Merit (2022).

Csernyus died on 29 May 2026, at the age of 64.
