= Rob Schumacher =

American photojournalist (1963/1964–2026)

- Born: 1963 or 1964
- Died: May 17, 2026 (aged 62)
- Occupation: Photojournalist

Rob Schumacher (1963 or 1964 – May 17, 2026) was an American photojournalist.

Schumacher worked for the The Arizona Republic for more than 30 years and was renowned for his sports photography. He died on May 17, 2026, at the age of 62.
