= François Vezin =

French philosopher and translator (1937–2026)

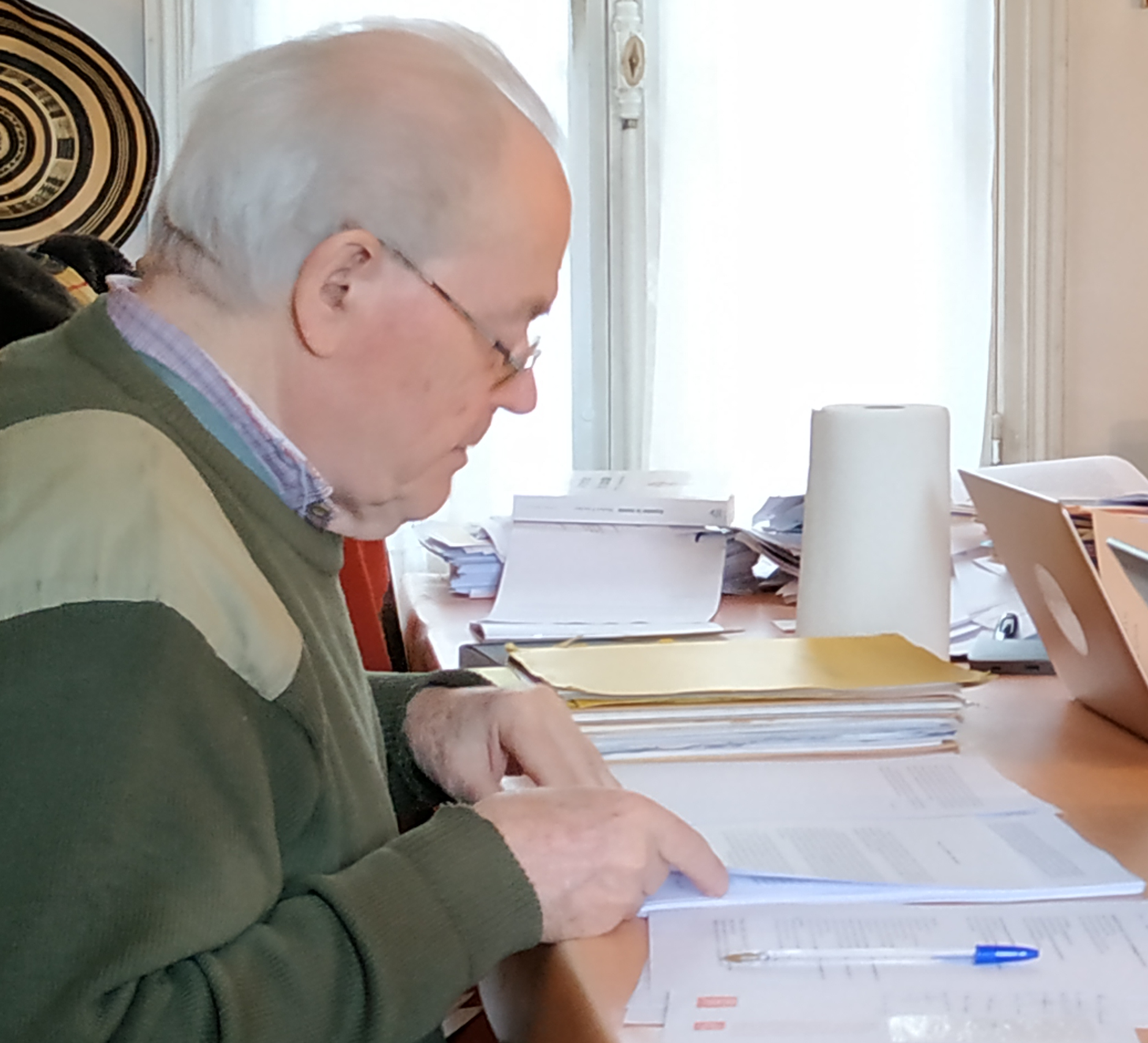
- Vezin in 2022
- Born: 5 February 1937; Loches, France
- Died: 31 May 2026 (aged 89)
- Occupations: Philosopher, translator

François Vezin (5 February 1937 – 31 May 2026) was a French philosopher and translator. He was best known for re-translating Martin Heidegger's German magnum opus book Being and Time in 1986. Libération stated his translation "provoked contrasting reactions in the academic world".

Vezin died on 31 May 2026, at the age of 89.
