= Peter R. Moody Jr. =

American political scientist (1943–2026)

- Born: October 13, 1943; San Francisco, California, United States
- Died: May 2, 2026 (aged 82)
- Education: Yale University (PhD, MA); Vanderbilt University (BA)
- Occupations: Professor emeritus, University of Notre Dame

Peter Richard Moody Jr. (Chinese: 穆磐石; October 13, 1943 – May 2, 2026) was an American political scientist and sinologist who was professor emeritus of political science at the University of Notre Dame in South Bend, Indiana. He was an expert on modern Chinese politics, Asian international affairs, Chinese political thought, international relations theory, and party theory.

== Background ==
Moody was born in San Francisco, California, on October 13, 1943, into an Air Force family. Due to his family's military background, he attended schools across various locations, including New York, Alabama, California, France, and Colorado, graduating from Air Academy High School in 1961.

He attended Vanderbilt University, where he earned a Bachelor of Arts degree in 1965. He then pursued graduate studies at Yale University, where he learned Chinese, studied Chinese politics (both at Yale and in Taiwan), and earned a Master of Arts in 1967, followed by a Doctor of Philosophy in 1971. His doctoral advisor was David N. Rowe.

In the fall of 1971, Moody began his academic career at the University of Notre Dame in the Department of Government and International Studies (later the Department of Political Science). He served as an assistant professor from 1971 to 1977, was promoted to associate professor in 1977, and became a full professor in 1983. He taught and conducted research at Notre Dame for over forty years until his retirement in 2013, when he was named professor emeritus.

During his career, Moody also served as an editor for the Chinese Documents Annual and as the book review editor for The Review of Politics. He was noted for mentoring numerous graduate students throughout his tenure, including the prominent Taiwanese political scientist Ming Chu-cheng.

== Academic research ==
Moody's research focused heavily on the mechanisms of opposition, dissent, and ideological shifts within mainland China and Taiwan. Regarding the Cultural Revolution, Moody argued that Mao Zedong and his followers attempted to resolve conflicts between different interest groups through class struggle, continuous revolution, and the dictatorship of the proletariat. He posited that this approach ultimately led to endless social upheaval, brutal political infighting, and the collapse of the national economy. Furthermore, Moody noted that such methods failed to prevent the newly elevated authorities from simply becoming another entrenched interest group. He maintained that conflicts between differing societal interest groups should instead be resolved through institutionalized democracy and the rule of law.

== Personal life and death ==
Moody's father, Peter R. Moody, was a professor at Air Force Academy. After serving with distinction in the military during World War II, he earned a PhD in English from the University of Cambridge. He married Peggy Shahan in 1966, whom he met during his freshman orientation at Vanderbilt University. The couple had six children. Moody was a polyglot who spoke multiple languages, including Chinese and French. A former college track and swimming competitor, he remained a lifelong fitness enthusiast.

Moody was actively involved in charitable service, serving for decades as a member and treasurer of the Sacred Heart chapter of the Society of St. Vincent de Paul. In the 1970s, he and his family took in refugees from war-torn countries and raised a foster daughter. Moody died on May 2, 2026, at the age of 82.

== Publications ==
- Conservative Thought in Contemporary China (Lexington 2007).
- Tradition and Modernization in China and Japan New Horizons in Comparative Politics (Belmont, 1994) ISBN 9780534245467.
- Political Change on Taiwan: A Study of Ruling Party Adaptability (New York, 1992).
- Political Opposition in Post-Confucian Society (New York, 1988).
- Chinese Politics After Mao: Development and Liberalization, 1976 to 1983 (New York, 1983).
- Opposition and Dissent in Contemporary China (Hoover Institution Press, 1977).
- The Politics of the Eighth Central Committee of the Communist Party of China (Hamden, 1973).
