= Karl Pischl =

Austrian politician (1940–2026)

Member of the Federal Council of Austria
- In office 5 May 1994 – 30 November 1997

Member of the National Council of Austria
- In office 24 November 1972 – 4 November 1990

Personal details
- Born: 30 June 1940 Innsbruck, Reichsgau Tirol-Vorarlberg, Germany
- Died: 19 May 2026 (aged 85)
- Party: ÖVP
- Occupation: Civil servant

Karl Pischl (30 June 1940 – 19 May 2026) was an Austrian politician. A member of the Austrian People's Party, he served in the National Council from 1972 to 1990 and in the Federal Council from 1994 to 1997.

Pischl died on 19 May 2026, at the age of 85.
