= Hoyle Schweitzer =

American surfer and businessman (1933–2026)

Hoyle Schweitzer (April 8, 1933 – May 31, 2026) was an American surfer and businessman. He is known for his role in popularizing the sport of windsurfing.

In 2020, Schweitzer and his wife, Diane, were inducted into the National Sailing Hall of Fame. He died on May 31, 2026, at the age of 93.
