= Dang Van Phuoc =

Vietnamese-American photojournalist (1935–2026)

- Born: October 2, 1935; Quảng Ngãi Province, Annam, French Indochina
- Died: May 23, 2026 (aged 90); Newport Beach, California, U.S.
- Occupation: Photojournalist
- Spouse: Pham Thi Hoa

Dang Van Phuoc (October 2, 1935 – May 23, 2026) was a Vietnamese-American photojournalist.

== Early life and career ==
Phuoc was born in a village near Quảng Ngãi Province in the South Central Coast. At the age of ten, his father was buried alive in sand and killed by the Viet Minh. He moved to Saigon, and worked as a volunteer in a film studio. While working as a volunteer, he taught himself photography.

In 1965, Phuoc was hired by the news agency Associated Press (AP), working as a photojournalist and capturing photos during the Vietnam War. He was referred as the "secret weapon" by Horst Faas. In 1968, he earned a commendation from the 9th Infantry Division of the United States Army, "for carrying a wounded soldier through fire". In 1969, he lost his right eye when a grenade exploded near him in Da Nang. In the same year, The Greenville News reported that he had been wounded four times during the war. After the Vietnam War ended, he briefly worked for AP in Hong Kong. He emigrated to the United States and settled in Southern California with his family, where he worked as a portrait photographer in Orange County, California.

== Personal life and death ==
Phuoc was married to Pham Thi Hoa. Their marriage lasted until Phuoc's death in 2026.

Phuoc died in Newport Beach, California, on May 23, 2026, at the age of 90.
