= Ursula Bäumlin =

Swiss politician (1938–2026)

Member of the Swiss National Council for Bern
- In office 30 November 1987 – 15 December 1998

Personal details
- Born: 12 May 1938 Bern, Switzerland
- Died: 7 May 2026 (aged 87)
- Party: SP
- Education: University of Bern
- Occupation: Theologian

Ursula Bäumlin (12 May 1938 – 7 May 2026) was a Swiss politician. A member of the Social Democratic Party, she served in the National Council from 1987 to 1998.

Bäumlin died on 7 May 2026, at the age of 87.
