= Jan Renders =

Dutch footballer (1938–2026)

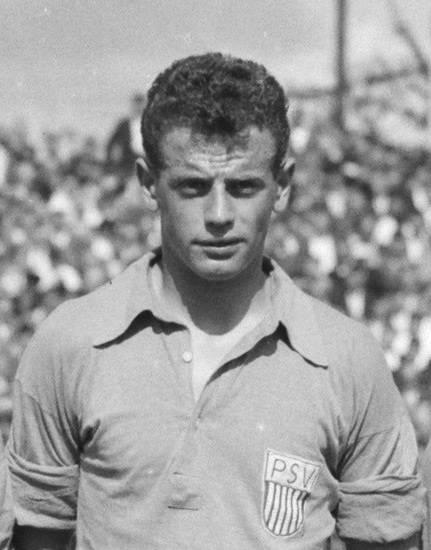
- Renders with PSV Eindhoven in 1959

Personal information
- Full name: Johannes Henricus Renders
- Date of birth: 11 February 1938
- Place of birth: Eindhoven, Netherlands
- Date of death: 23 May 2026 (aged 88)
- Position: Left-back

Senior career*
| Years | Team | Apps | (Gls) |
| 1956–1964 | PSV Eindhoven | | |
| 1964–1968 | GVAV-Rapiditas | | |
| 1968–1971 | Helmond Sport | | |

International career
| 1959–1962 | Netherlands | 5 | (0) |
- * Club domestic league appearances and goals

Johannes Henricus "Jan" Renders (11 February 1938 – 23 May 2026) was a Dutch footballer who played as a left-back for PSV Eindhoven and GVAV-Rapiditas, among other clubs. He made five appearances for the Netherlands national team from 1959 to 1962.

Renders died on 23 May 2026, at the age of 88.
