= Graham Goninon =

Australian rules footballer (1945–2026)

Personal information
- Born: 1 May 1945
- Died: 12 May 2026 (aged 81)
- Original team: Reservoir
- Height: 178 cm (5 ft 10 in)
- Weight: 81 kg (179 lb)

Playing career
Years	Club	Games (Goals)
1963–1965	Fitzroy	4 (0)

Graham Goninon (1 May 1945 – 12 May 2026) was an Australian rules footballer who played with Fitzroy in the Victorian Football League (VFL).
