= Piotr Pyzik =

Polish politician (1959–2026)

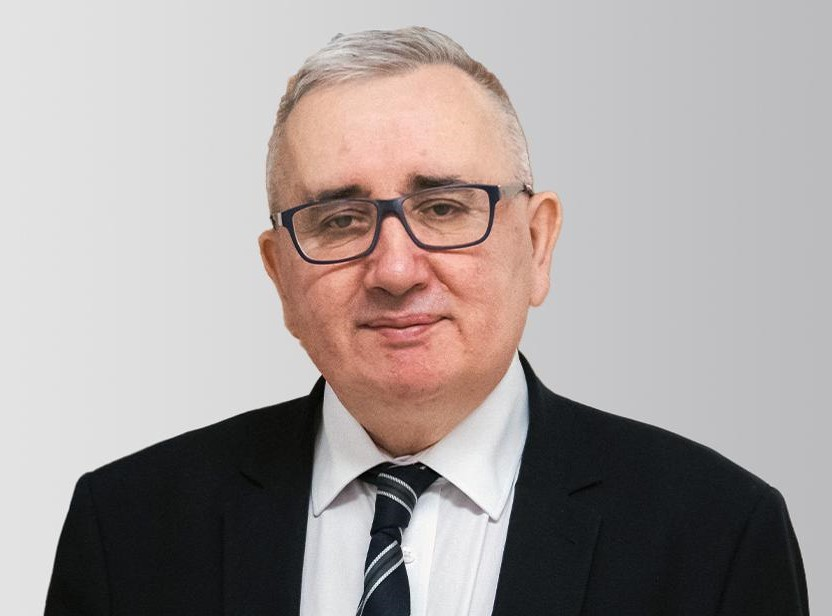
- Pyzik in 2021

Member of the Sejm
- In office 8 November 2011 – 11 November 2019

Personal details
- Born: Piotr Mieczysław Pyzik; 1 January 1959 Puławy, Poland
- Died: 23 May 2026 (aged 67)
- Party: PiS
- Education: Silesian University of Technology; Academy of International Relations and American Studies in Warsaw
- Occupation: Civil servant

Piotr Mieczysław Pyzik (1 January 1959 – 23 May 2026) was a Polish politician. A member of Law and Justice, he served in the Sejm from 2011 to 2019.

Pyzik died on 23 May 2026, at the age of 67.
