= José Ribamar Pereira =

Brazilian politician (1944–2026)

Member of the Legislative Assembly of Piauí
- In office January 2011
- In office 1 February 1999 – 31 January 2003

Personal details
- Born: 11 July 1944 Barras, Piauí, Brazil
- Died: 18 May 2026 (aged 81) Teresina, Piauí, Brazil
- Party: PMDB
- Occupation: Businessman

José Ribamar Pereira (11 July 1944 – 18 May 2026) was a Brazilian politician. A member of the Brazilian Democratic Movement Party, he served in the Legislative Assembly of Piauí from 1999 to 2003 and again in January 2011.

Pereira died in Teresina on 18 May 2026, at the age of 81.
