= Gérard Revol =

French politician (1937–2026)

Deputy of the French National Assembly for Gard's 3rd constituency
- In office 12 June 1997 – 18 June 2002
- Preceded by: Gilbert Baumet
- Succeeded by: Jean-Marc Roubaud

Mayor of Bagnols-sur-Cèze
- In office June 1995 – March 2001
- Preceded by: René Cret
- Succeeded by: René Cret

Personal details
- Born: 9 April 1937 Fontaine, France
- Died: 17 May 2026 (aged 89)
- Party: PS
- Occupation: Engineer

Gérard Revol (French: [ʒeʁˈaʁ ʁəvˈɔl]; 9 April 1937 – 17 May 2026) was a French politician of the Socialist Party (PS).

Most notably serving as a deputy in the National Assembly from 1997 to 2002, he was also mayor of Bagnols-sur-Cèze from 1995 to 2001.

Revol died on 17 May 2026, at the age of 89.
