= Jacqueline Maurer-Mayor =

Swiss politician (1947–2026)

Member of the Council of State of Vaud
- In office 1 May 1997 – 30 June 2007
- Preceded by: Jacques Martin

Member of the Grand Council of Vaud
- In office 5 March 1978 – 3 March 1985
- In office 10 March 1989 – 1 May 1997

Personal details
- Born: 22 June 1947 Vaulion, Switzerland
- Died: 18 May 2026 (aged 78)
- Party: PRD
- Occupation: Civil servant

Jacqueline Maurer-Mayor (22 June 1947 – 18 May 2026) was a Swiss politician of the Radical Democratic Party (PRD).

Maurer-Mayor served on the Grand Council of Vaud from 1978 to 1985 and again from 1989 to 1997. She was then the first woman to ever serve on the Council of State of Vaud, holding the office from 1997 to 2007.

Maurer-Mayor died on 18 May 2026, at the age of 78.
