= Karl-Heinz Mühe =

German politician (1949–2026)

Member of the Landtag of Lower Saxony
- In office 21 June 1986 – 4 March 2003

Personal details
- Born: 13 January 1949 Schöppenstedt, Lower Saxony, Allied-occupied Germany
- Died: 1 May 2026 (aged 77)
- Party: SPD
- Education: Pädagogische Hochschule Braunschweig
- Occupation: Teacher

Karl-Heinz Mühe (13 January 1949 – 1 May 2026) was a German politician. A member of the Social Democratic Party, he served in the Landtag of Lower Saxony from 1986 to 2003.

Mühe died on 1 May 2026, at the age of 77.
