= François Potez =

French Roman Catholic priest (1955–2026)

- Born: 1955
- Died: 20 May 2026 (aged 70–71)
- Education: École navale
- Occupation: Priest

François Potez (1955 – 20 May 2026) was a French Roman Catholic priest.

== Biography ==
Born in 1955, Potez entered the École navale, from where he graduated in 1976. He served in the French Navy until 1982, when he quit the military to join the Community of St. John. He was ordained a priest in 1989, at the age of 34. He left the Community of St. John in 1997 and was incardinated in the Archdiocese of Paris. From 1998 to 2006, he was rector of Saint-Eugène-Sainte-Cécile, where he sought to reconcile two forms of the Roman Missal. He was then rector of Notre-Dame-du-Travail, Paris from 2007 to 2019, and then of the Église Saint-Philippe-du-Roule from 2022 to 2025. Throughout his priesthood, he worked extensively on marriage preparation and children's education.

Potez died of pancreatic cancer in Paris on 20 May 2026.

== Publications ==
- Etre prêtre aujourd'hui: Un livre indispensable pour tous les prêtres et chrétiens aujourd'hui (2023), winner of the Prix de littérature religieuse
- Puisque vous avez décidé de vous aimer… Conseils pour les premières années de mariage (2024)
- L'Urgence de l'amour. Homélies du Carême et de Pâques (2026)
