= Notre-Dame-du-Travail, Paris =

Roman Catholic church

Coordinates: 48.8360°N 2.3171°E

Notre-Dame-du-Travail
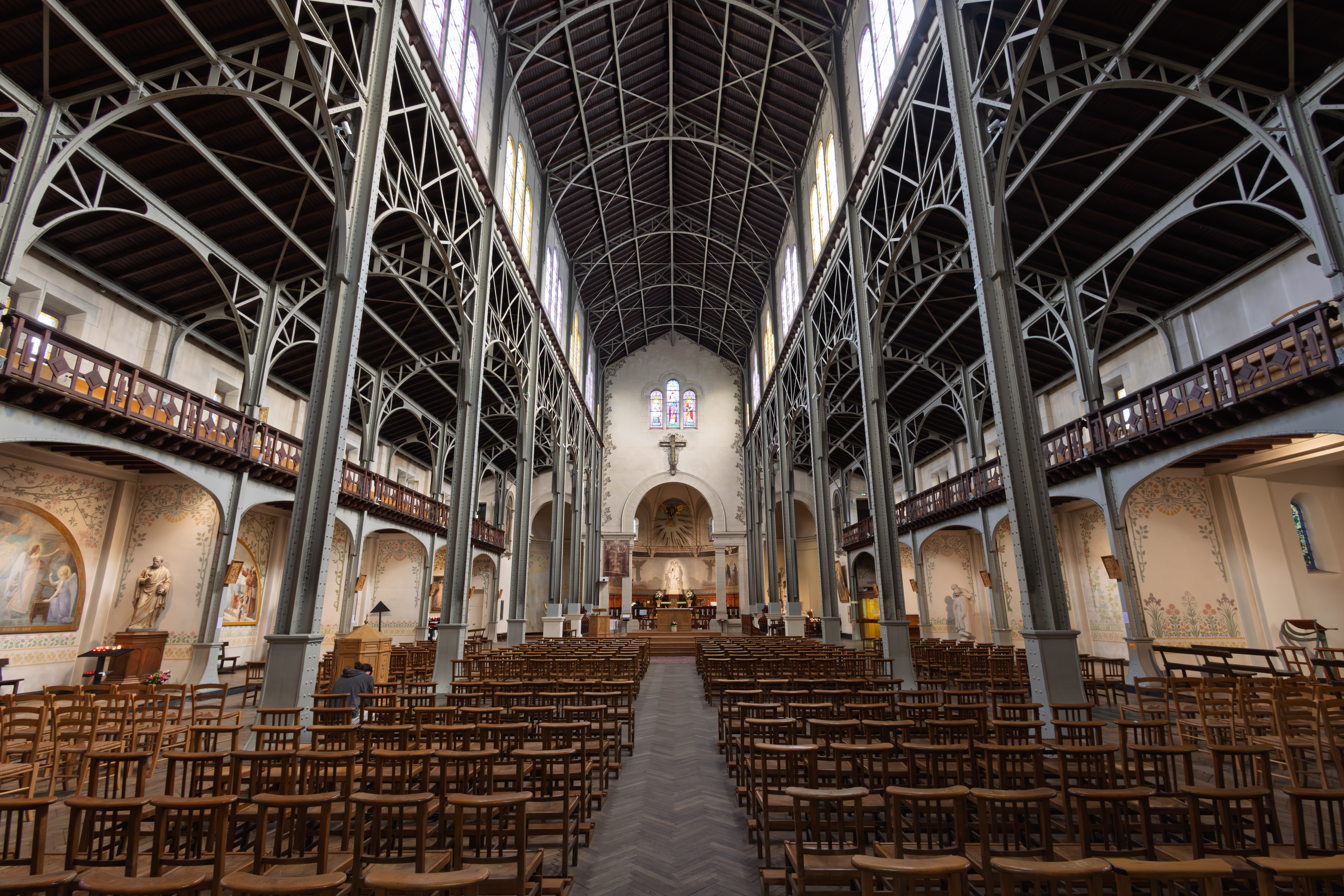
- Nave of Notre-Dame-du-Travail, facing choir

Religion
- Affiliation: Roman Catholic Church
- Diocese: Roman Catholic Archdiocese of Paris
- Region: Île-de-France
- Rite: Latin Rite
- Status: Active

Location
- Location: 14th arrondissement, Paris, France
- Interactive map of Notre-Dame-du-Travail

Architecture
- Architect: Jules-Godefroy Astruc
- Groundbreaking: 1897
- Completed: 1902

Notre-Dame-du-Travail (also known as Notre-Dame-du-Travail de Plaisance) is a Roman Catholic church located at 59 rue Vercingetorix in the 14th arrondissement of Paris. It was built between 1897 and 1902 for the largely working-class population of the Plaisance neighborhood. It is notable particularly for its exposed steel framework in the interior, resembling a factory, in contrast to the more traditional exterior. The entire church was registered as an historic monument on July 5, 2016.

== History ==
A small chapel built in 1848, had preceded the present church, when the village was still just outside the city limits of Paris, surrounded by wheat fields. and had a population of two thousand. After the Gare de l'Ouest railway station (now Gare Montparnasse) was built, the neighborhood was renamed Plaisance, and became an industrial center, and the working class population grew rapidly. The Plaisance parish was annexed to Paris in 1860, and, as the population grew, the chapel was enlarged with a third traverse. In 1870, when the city was besieged by the Prussians during the Franco-Prussian War, the church was used as a hospital. During the Paris Commune in 1871, the church was briefly confiscated and the priest imprisoned.

As the population of the neighborhood grew, the church was soon overcrowded. In 1884 the vicar, Father Roger Soulange-Bodin, organized a national campaign to raise funds for a new and bigger church. He wrote, "Why a church? To unite in a religious setting the workers of all classes. Why Paris? Because Paris is correctly considered the center of labor and industry. Why the Plaisance quarter? Because it is a unique neighborhood inhabited uniquely of workers, which at present does not have a church for its thirty-five thousand inhabitants."

The initial funds were raised, and construction began. The architect was Jules-Godefroy Astruc (1862–1955), who had also built Saint Hippolytus Church in the 13th arrondissement. The work was delayed by high costs, and Soulange-Bodin had to raise more funds to complete it. He was obliged to donate the rest of his personal fortune to finish the work. With the help of donations from local businesses and industrial enterprises, the church was finally completed in April 1902. Restoration and modifications took place in the 1960s and 1970s

== Exterior ==
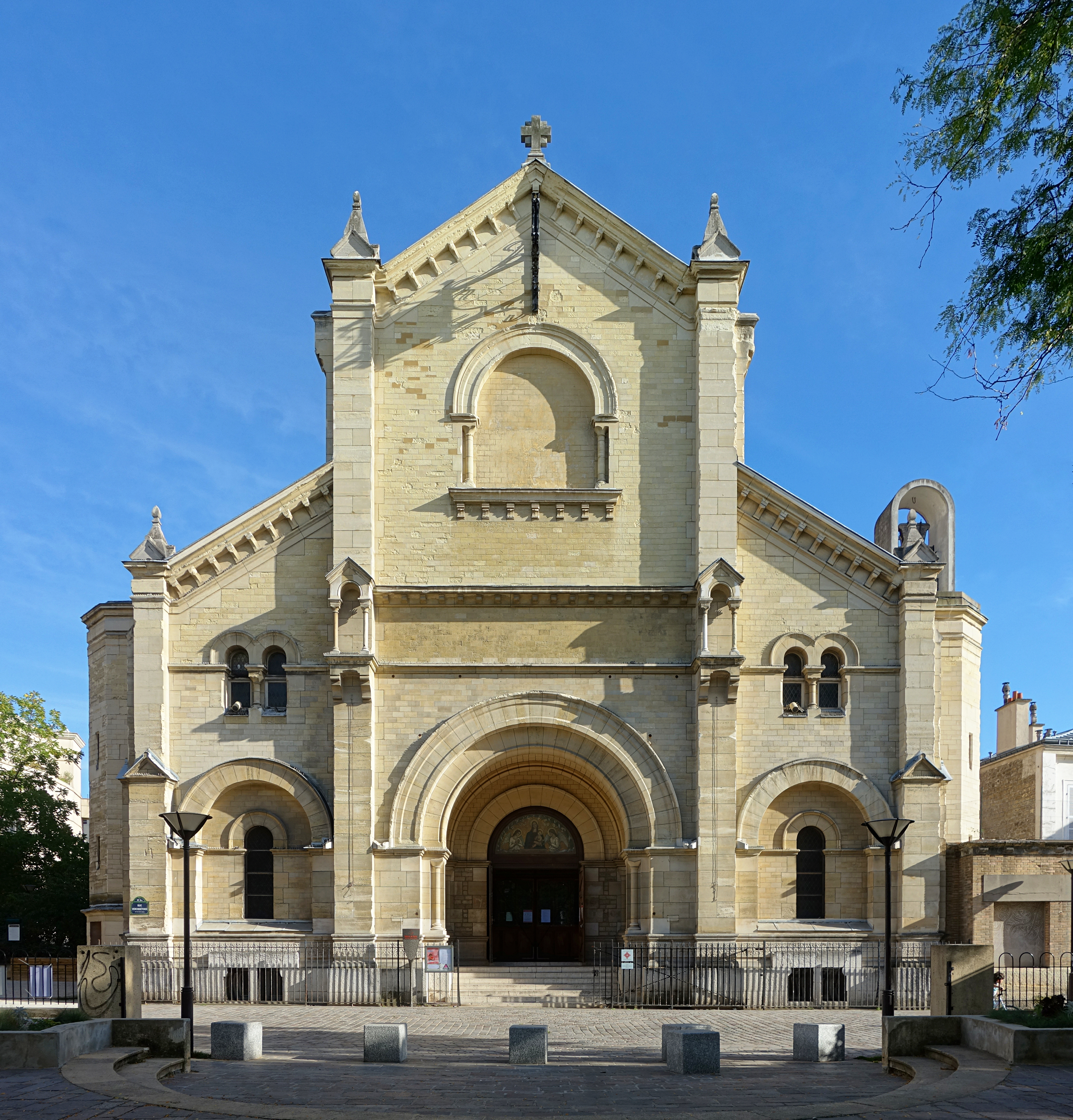
The facade

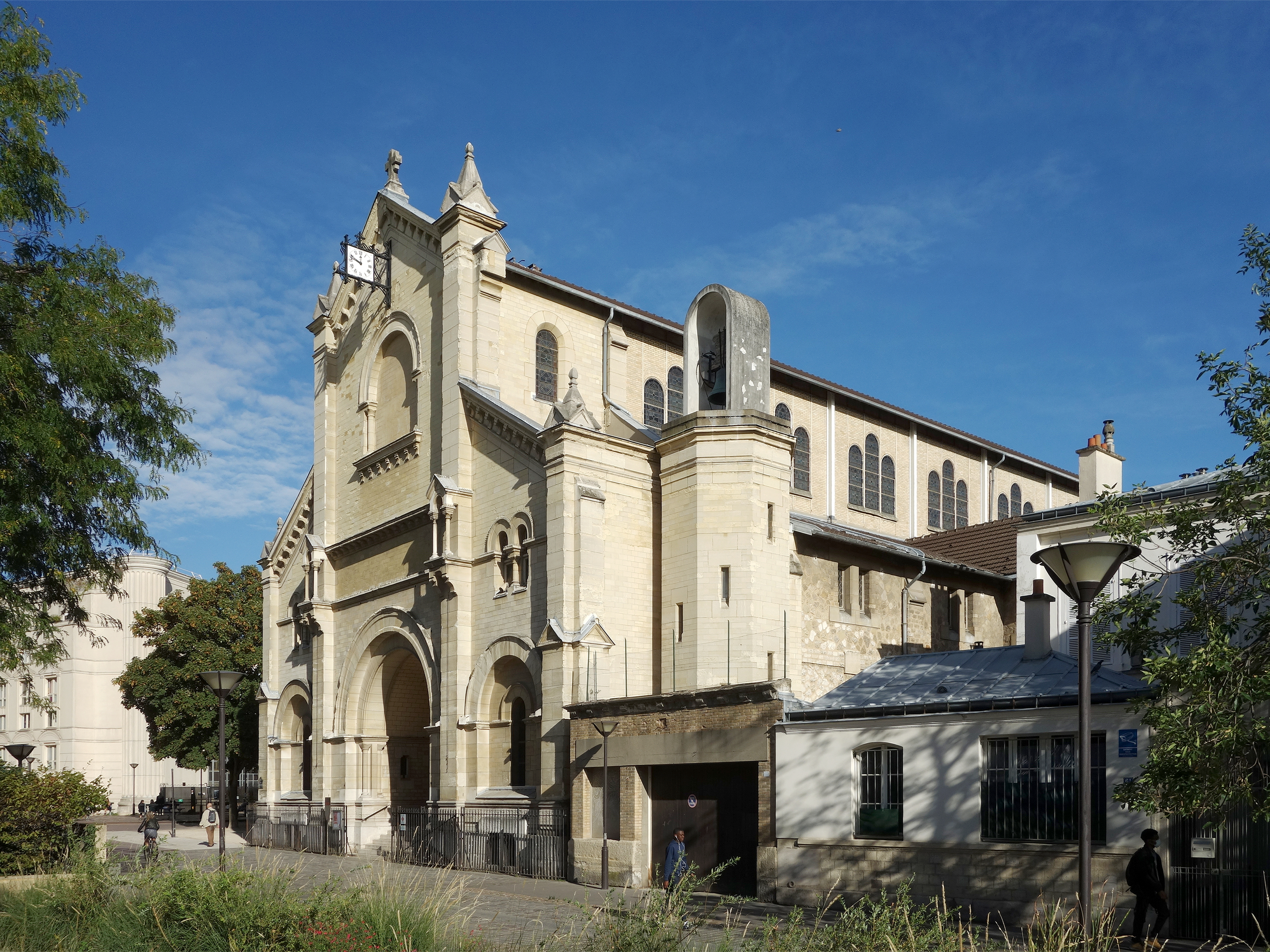
Side view with bell tower

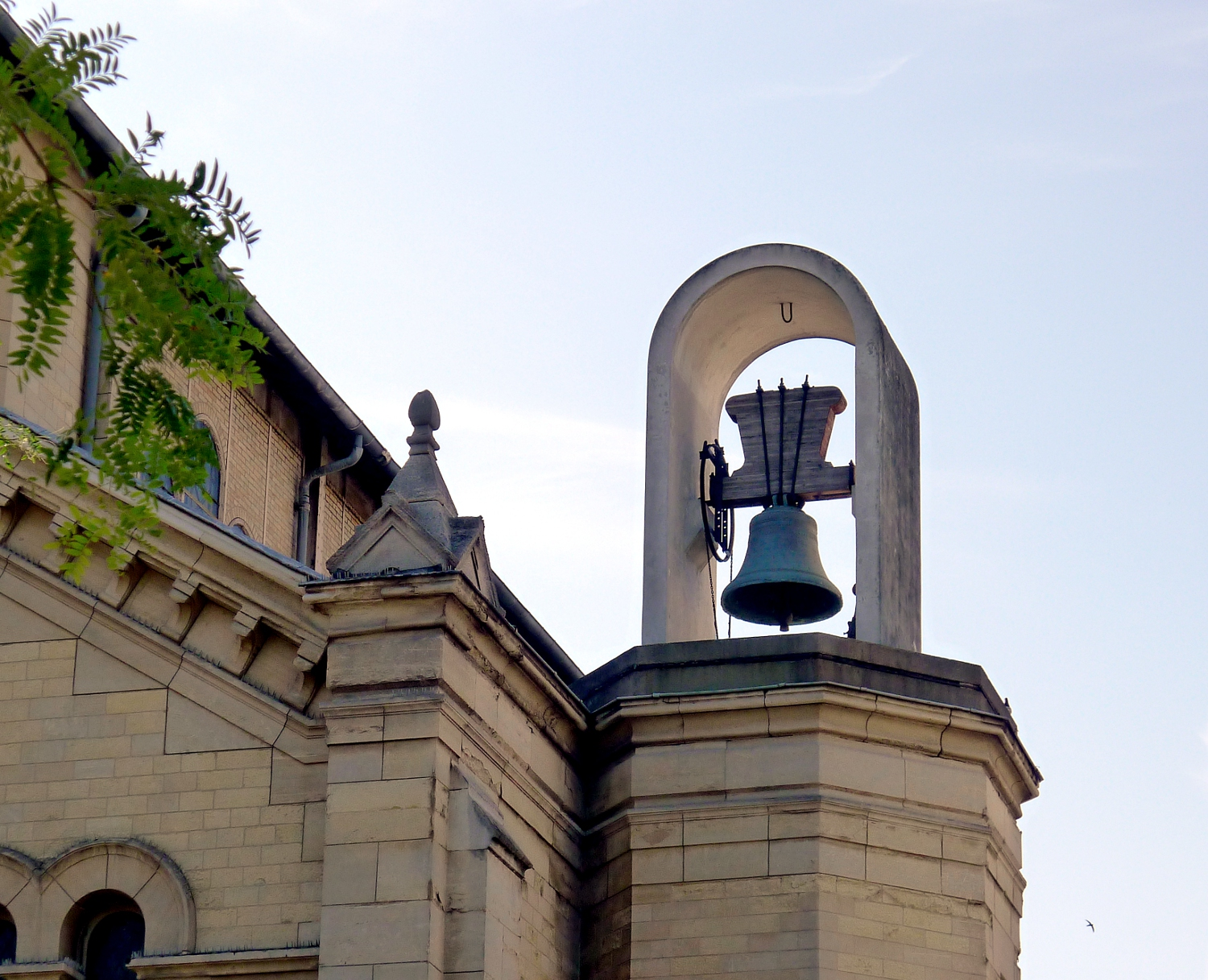
The bell tower with the Bell of Sevastopol.

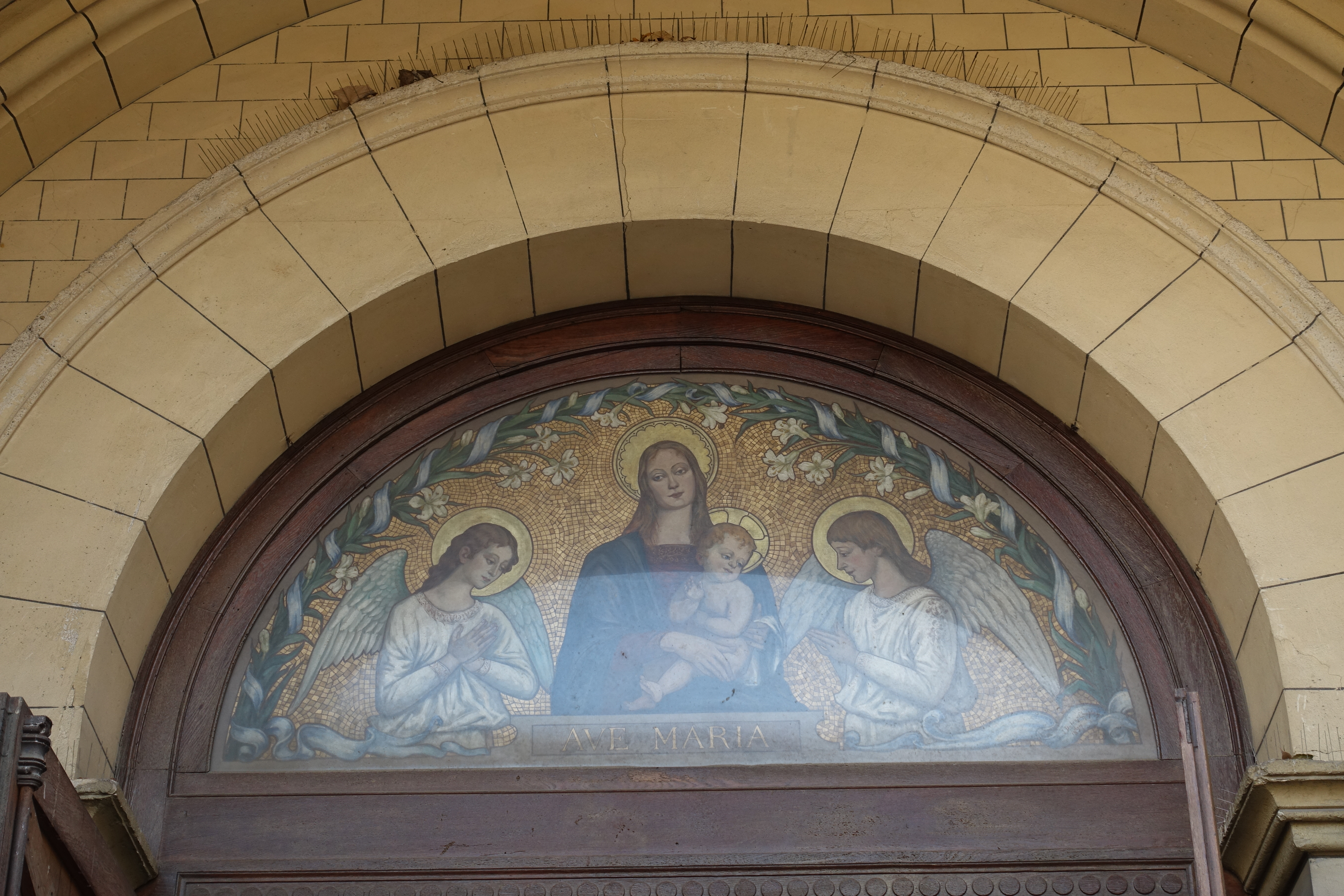
Neo-Byzantine Fresco of the Virgin Mary over the portal by Geneviève and Henri Taillefert, (20th c.)

The exterior of the church, facing Square du Cardinal-Wyszynski, is in the neo-Romanesque style, giving little hint of the modern features of the interior.

A notable work of art on the exterior is found in the tympanum over the portal. "The Virgin and Child" was painted in the neo-Byzantine style by Genevieve and Henri Taillefert at the beginning of the 20th century.

=== The Bell of Sevastopol and the Carillon ===
The facade is flanked by octagonal towers on either side. One tower also serves as a bell tower. It holds a large bell, brought to Paris from Sevastopol as a trophy at the end of the Crimean War, in 1854. The victorious French general Patrice de Mac Mahon took five bells from the cathedral and brought them to France as war trophies. Four of the bells were given to the Cathedral of Notre-Dame de Paris (where they are on display in a corridor) and the fifth was given to Notre-Dame du Travail, before its reconstruction. In 1865 the Emperor Napoleon III and the Empress Eugenie personally presented the bell to the church . The bell weighs 551 kilograms, and is 100 centimetres in diameter and 94 centimetres high. When the church moved to its present location, it was found that the bell was too heavy for the tower, and it was placed in the garden, where it remained until 1976. when it was transferred to new concrete structure built on top of the old stairway tower.

In addition the Bell of Sevastopol, the church has a carillon with four bells placed on the roof. It plays a brief melody of six notes (re-sharp, do-sharp, si, do-sharp, re-sharp, sol-sharp) every quarter hour.

== Interior ==
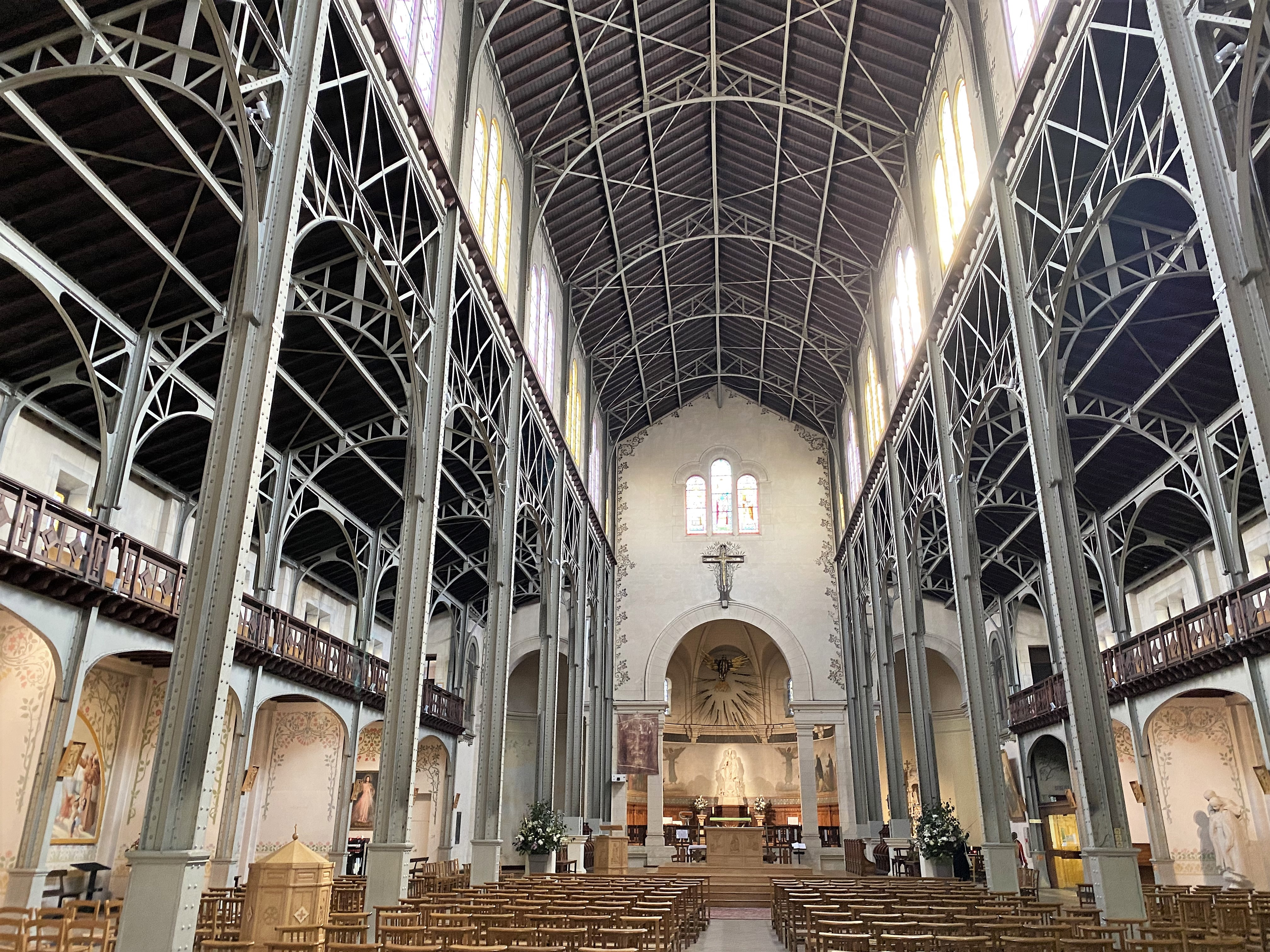
Interior, facing the choir

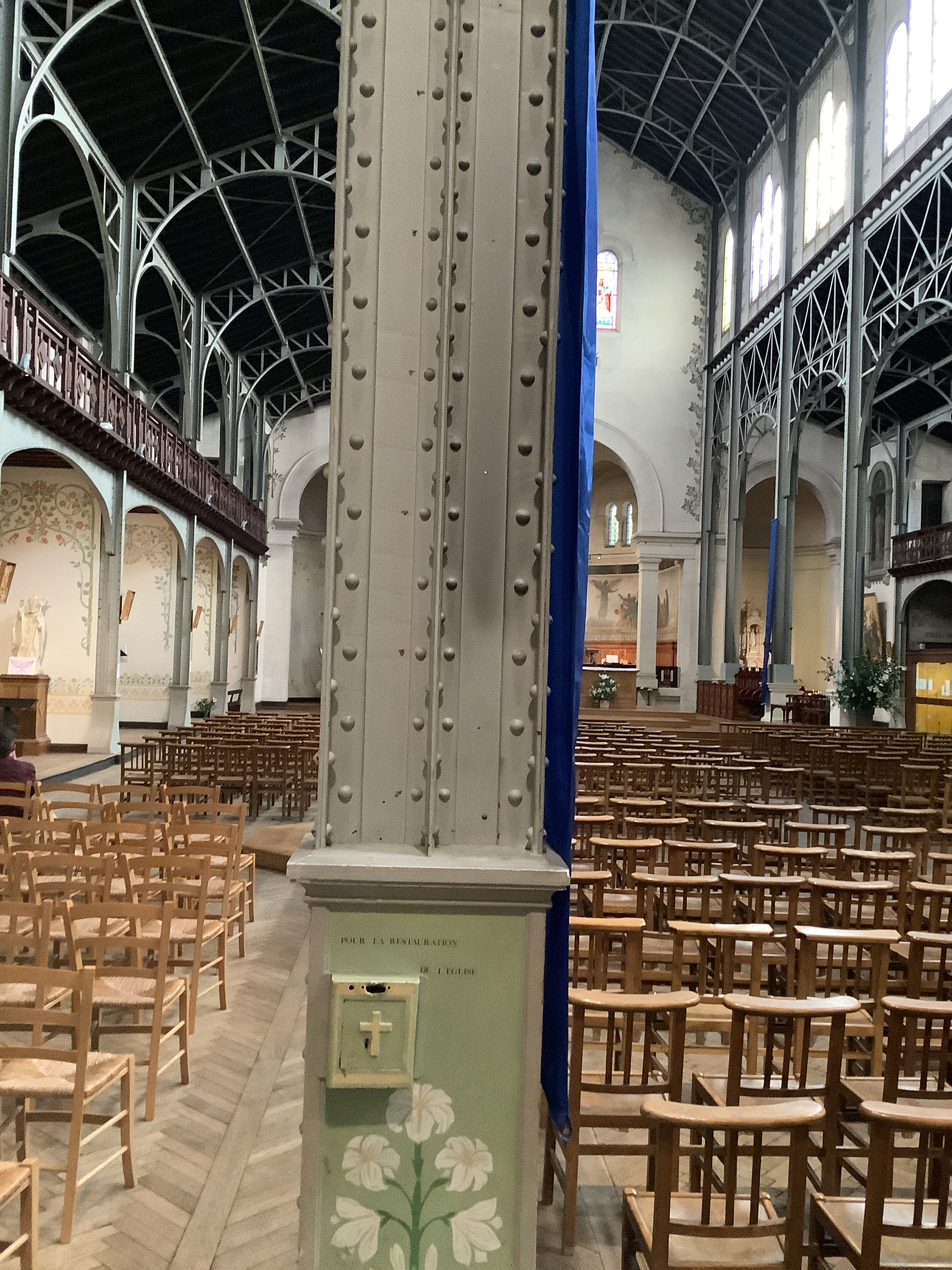
Steel column in the nave

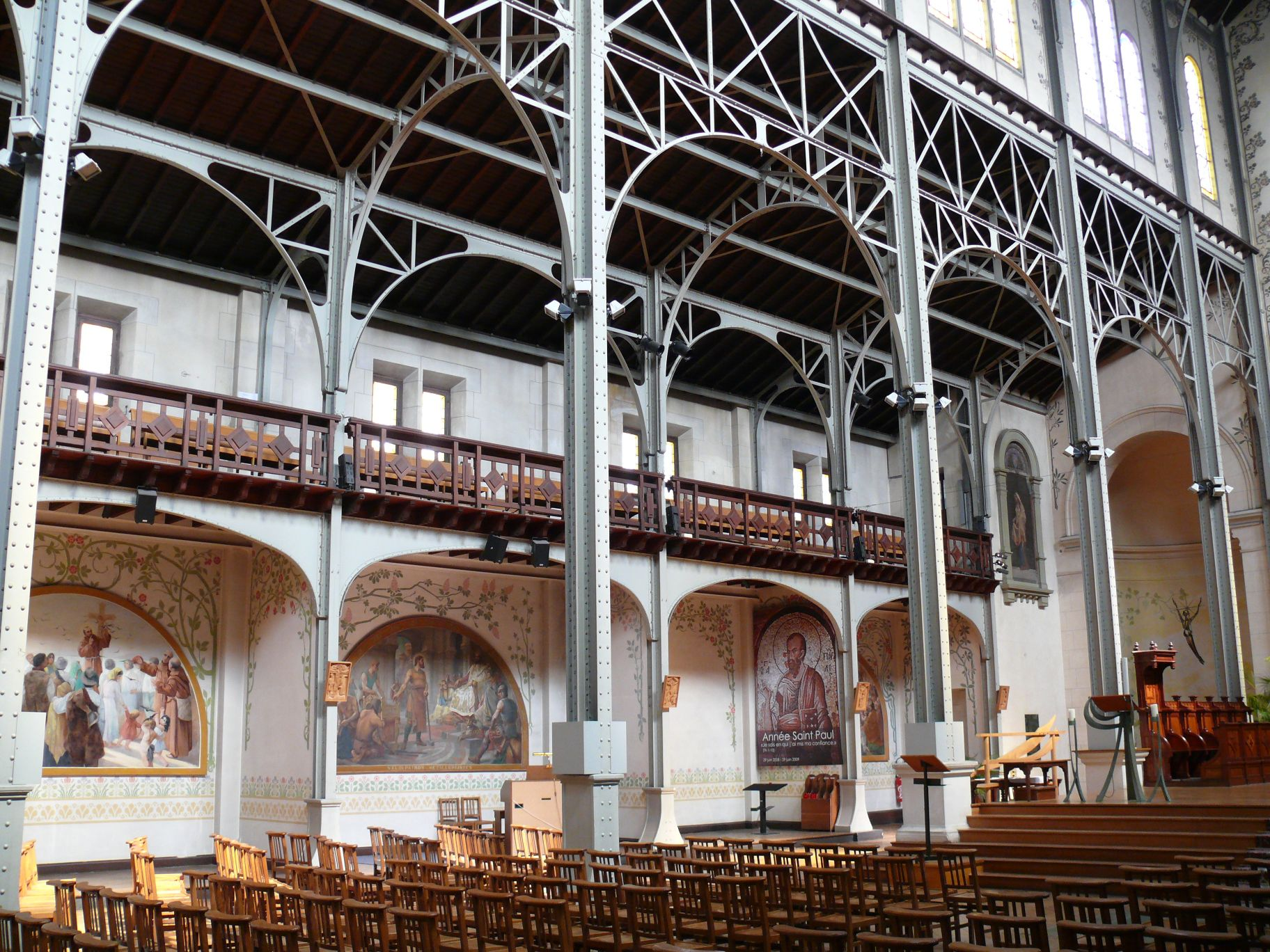
Arcades of the nave, lined with small chapels

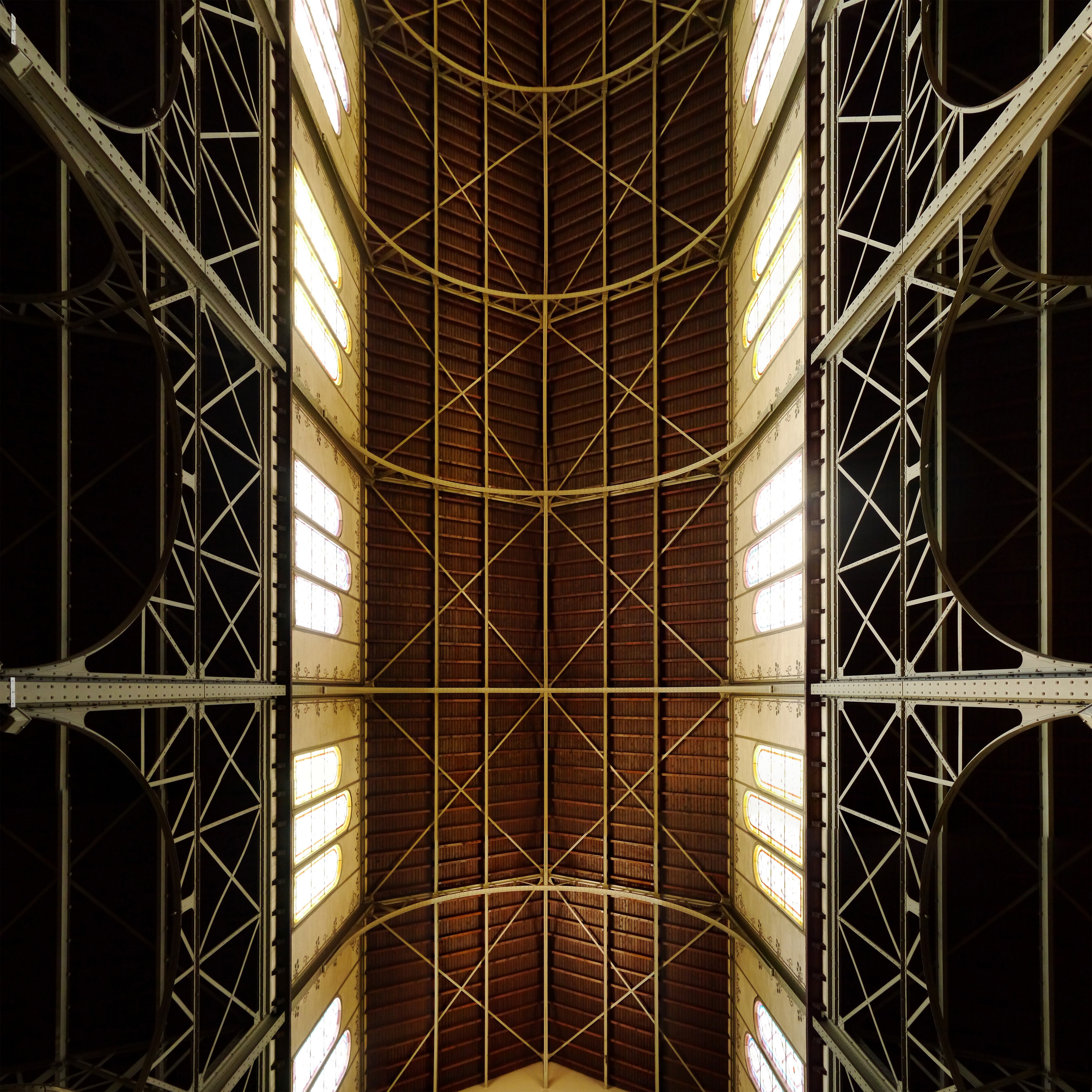
Steel vaulted ceiling

The church is fifty-nine metres long and twenty-five metres high. The central part of the nave 9.5 metres wide and twenty metres high, up to the steel ribs of the vault. The most prominent features of the interior are the two rows of steel columns which divide the church into a central aisle and two collateral aisles. The collateral aisles are lined with small chapels, with the nave flanked by arcades supporting the arches of the ceiling and the collateral aisles, replacing the traditional stone columns of earlier churches. Astruc deliberately made the interior look industrial, so that "it would call to the mind of the worker his factory, surrounded by a familiar milieu."

According to some accounts, the steel framework was recuperated from the Palace of Industry of the 1855 Paris Universal Exposition, which had been demolished to make room for the Paris Universal Exposition of 1900. Astruc riveted the pieces together, following his own plan, leaving the plates and rivets fully visible. The new elements of the frame were fabricated in a workshop on Boulevard de Vaugirard, and brought to the site for installation.

=== The Choir and Chapel of the Virgin ===
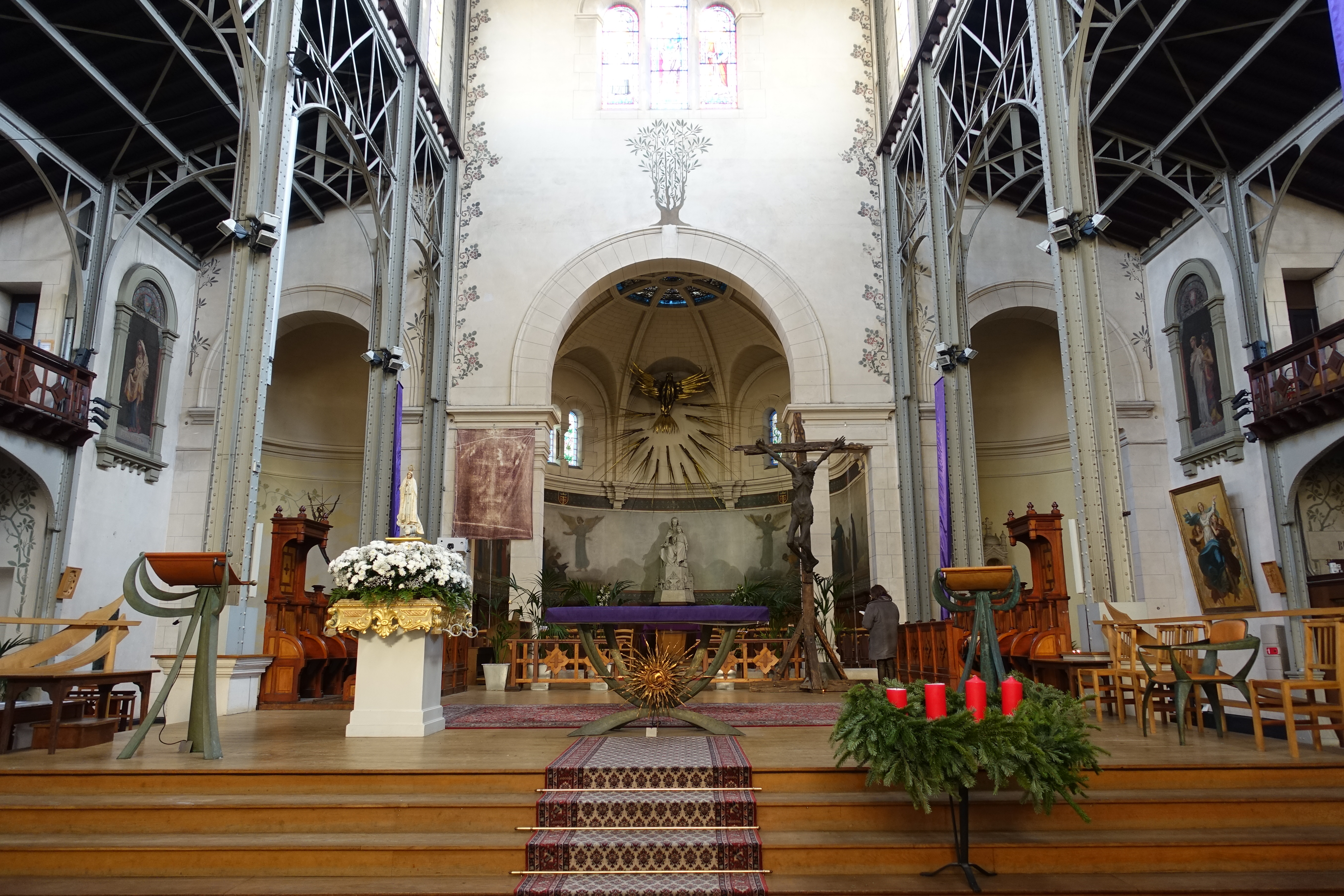
The Choir

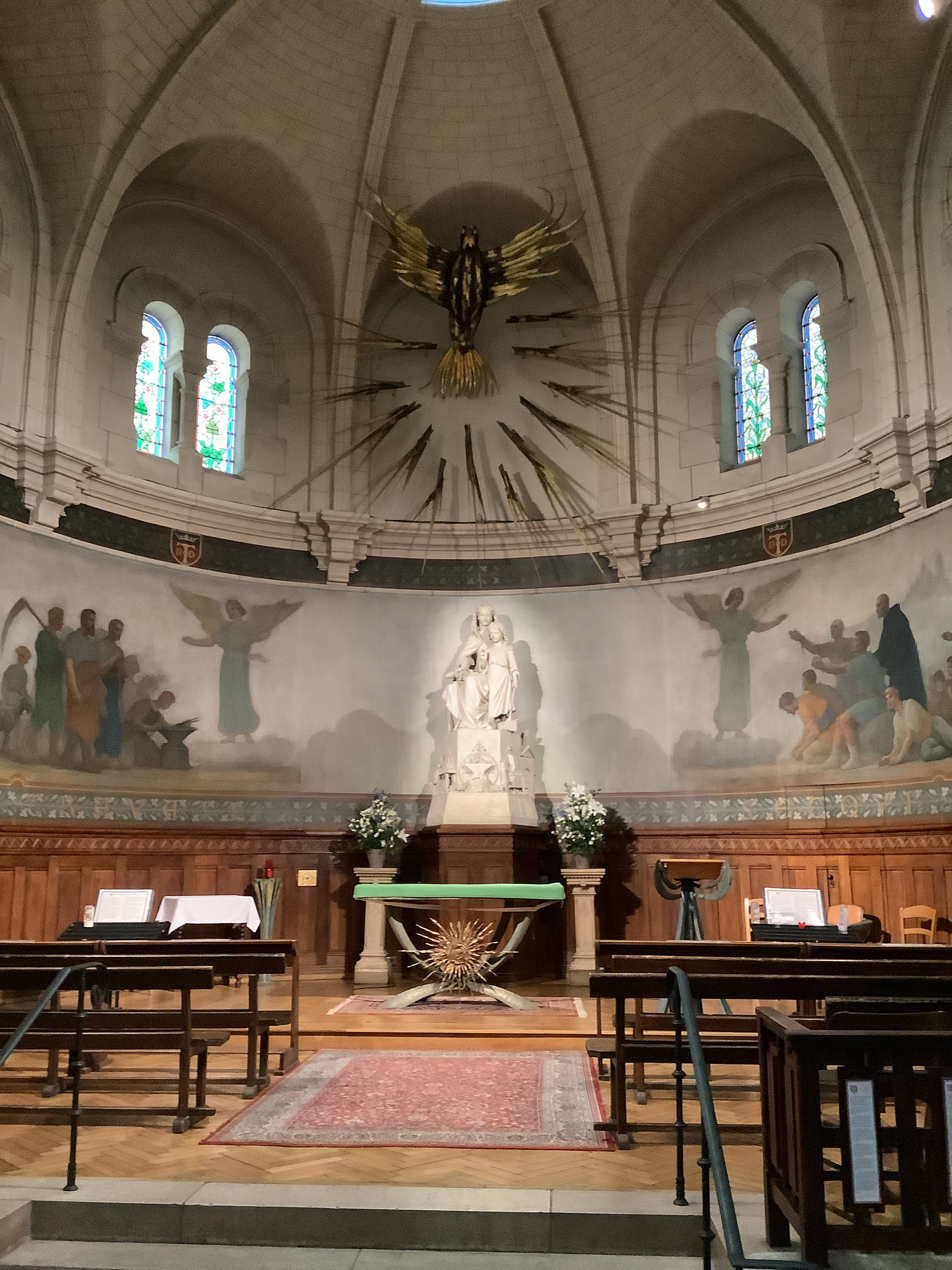
Chapel of the Virgin, behind the altar

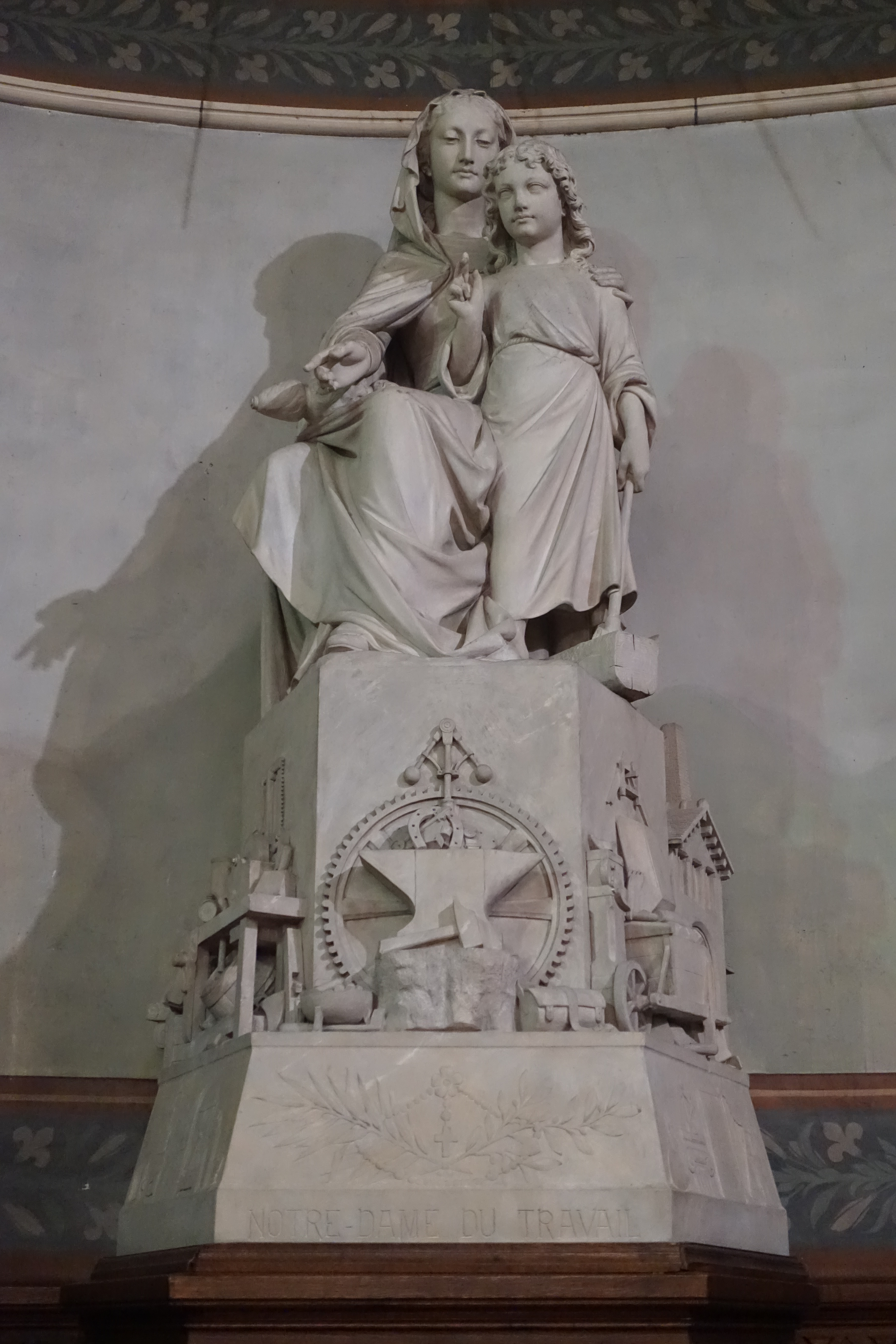
Christ with the Virgin Mary.by Joseph Lefèvre. On the base, the sculptures depict the tools of different professions.

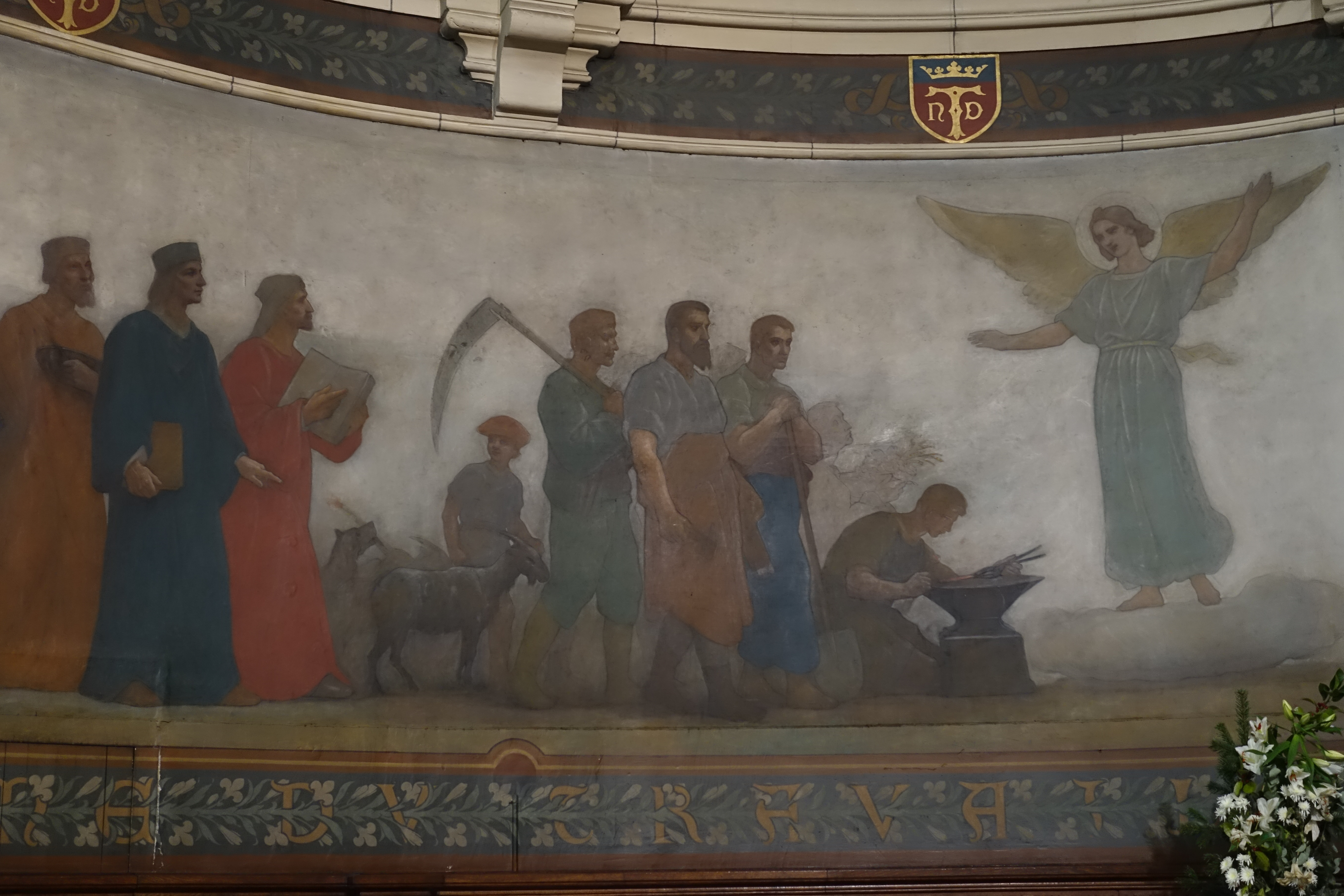
Fresco in the Chapel of the Virgin, angel with workers by Félix Villé (1904)

The choir, where the altar is located, has three arcades with rounded arches, in the neo-Romanesque style. The central portion is covered by a half-dome, with stained glass windows above it. The Chapel of the Virgin ia located in the apse, directly behind the altar.

The statue of the Virgin Mary with the child Jesus behind the altar was made in 1898 by Joseph Lefévre (1836-1911). It was carved out of a single block of limestone which weighs seven thousand kilograms. In keeping with the theme of "Our Lady of Labor", the base of statue is decorated with carvings that illustrate the principal industries in the paris.

The chapel is decorated with two monumental frescos, one on either side of the altar, each two metres high and nine metres long, together called "Notre-Dame du Travail, assistance to the afflicted", They offer a tribute to work and to charity. The first illustrates an angel appearing to workers of varied professions, and the second show acts charity, including the liberation of captives, the education of the young, and assistance to the sick. The frescos were the work of Félix Villé, and were made in 1904.

The chapels of sides of the choir are also decorated with sculptural work full of symbolism. "Christ in Glory" on the left side, depicts a gilded abstract figure of Christ floating in the air over a tabernacle of scrolls surrounded by an abstract sculpural fire, representing the burning bush of the Old Testament. This sculpture was made by Jean-Jacques Bris in the early 20th century. The modernist altar was also designed by Jean-Jacques Bris, and dates from the 20th century. On he right is a statue of Christ on the cross is from the same period, and is the work of Charles Correia.

== The Side Chapels ==
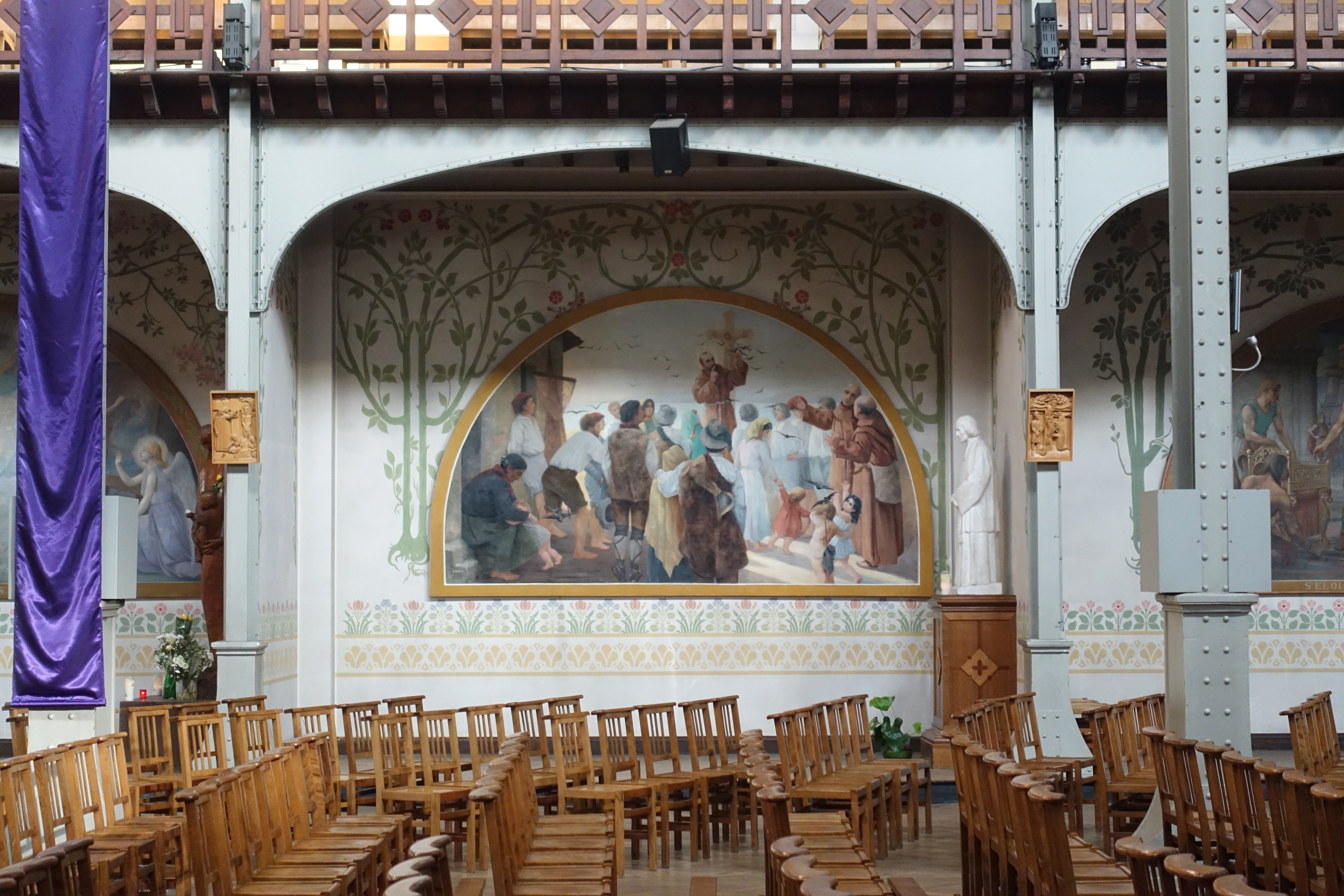
Chapel of Saint Francis of Assisi. with painting by Emile Desouches

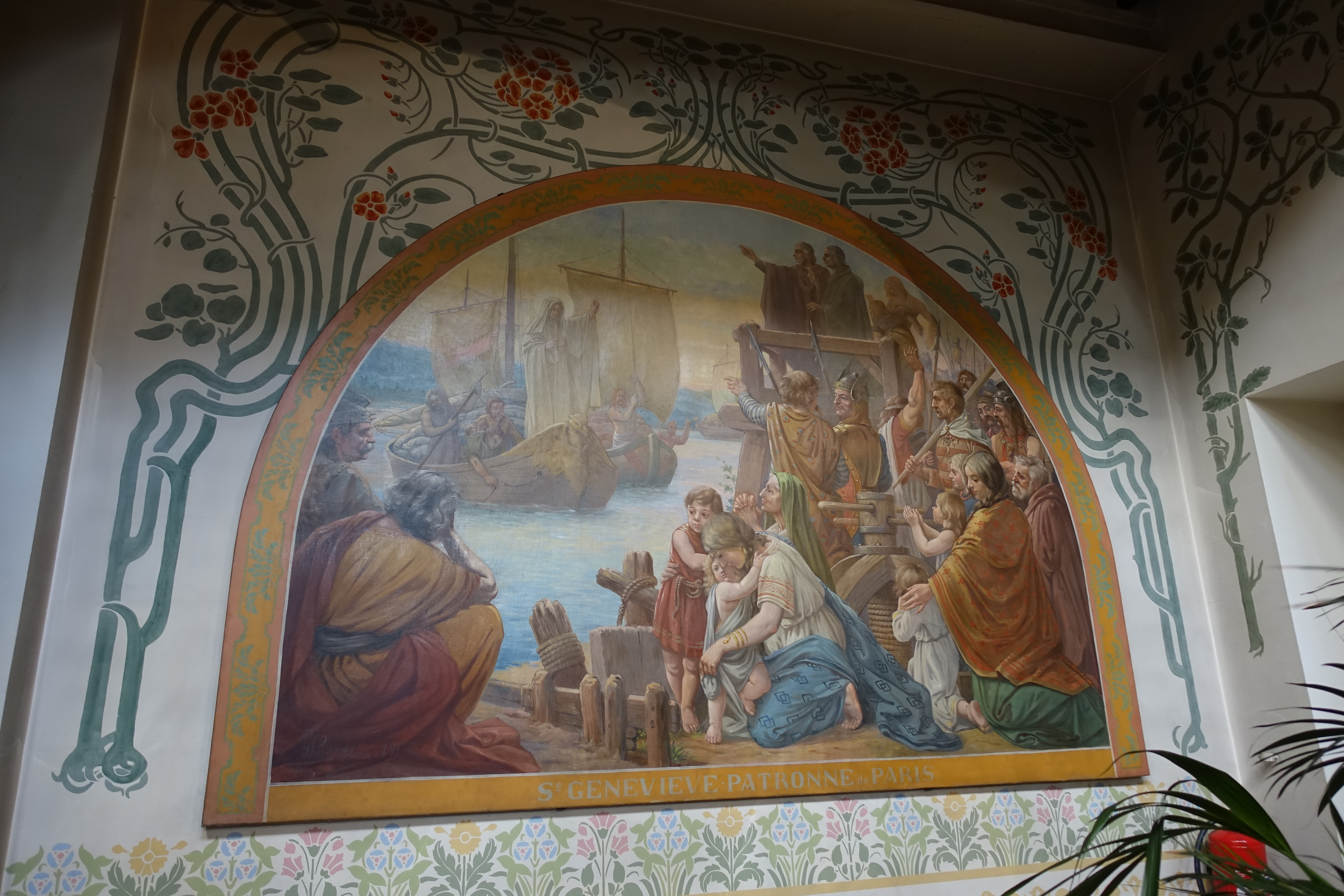
Chapel of Saint Genevieve, Patron Saint of Paris" by Guiseppe Uberti

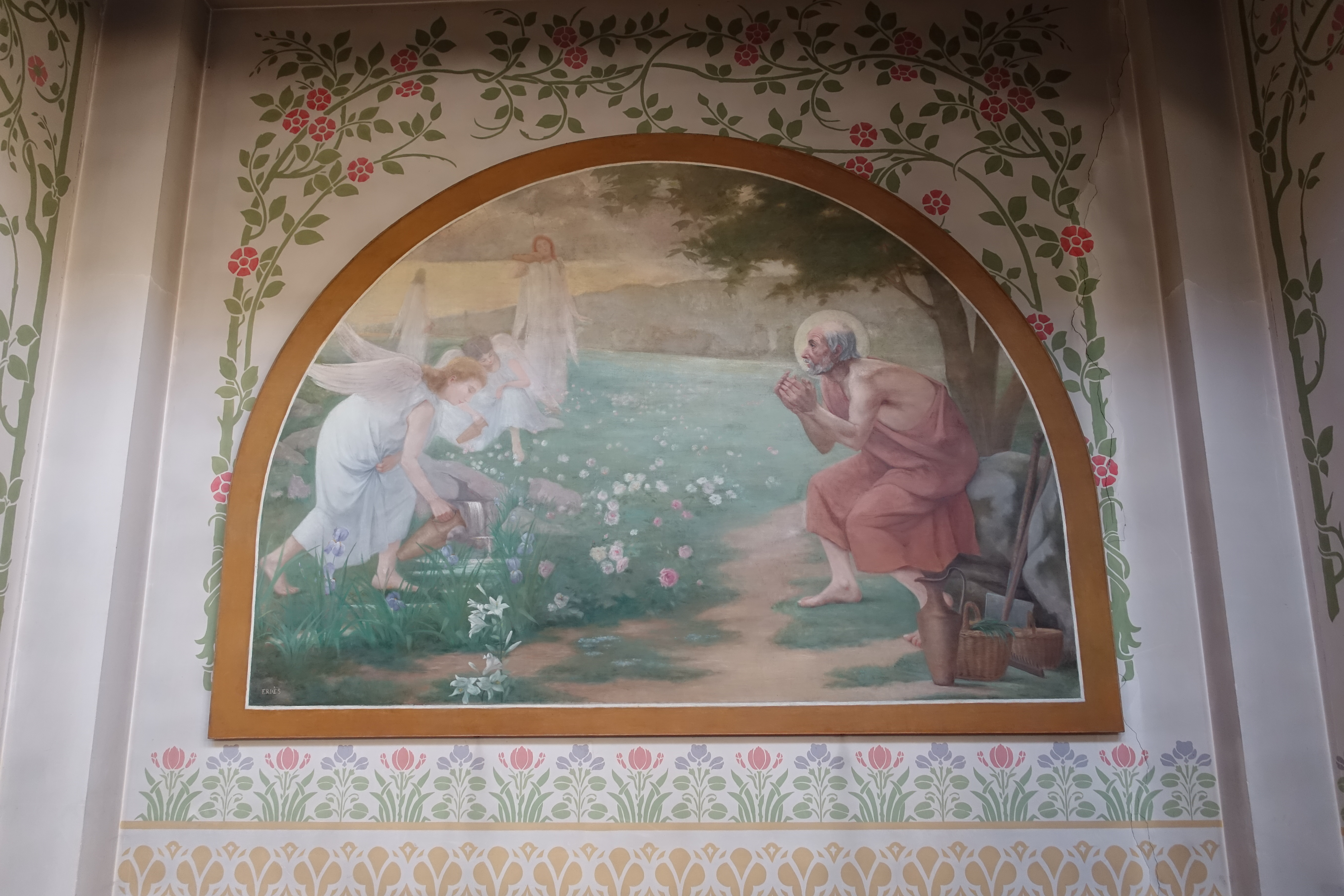
Chapel of Saint Fiacre, "The Saint with Angels". Tools of a gardener are placed beside the Saint.

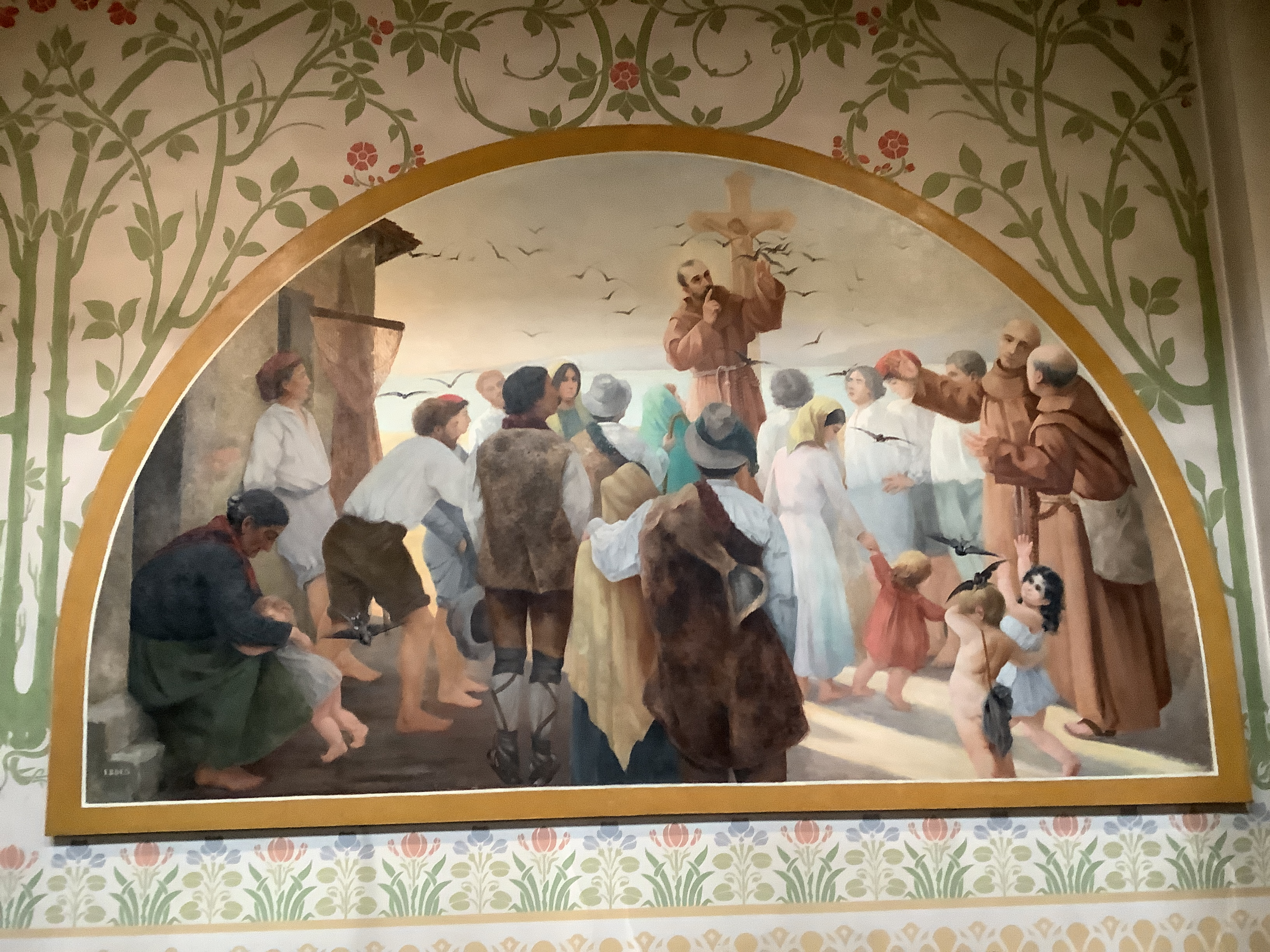
"Saint Francis of Assisi"- Notre Dame de Travail, Paris

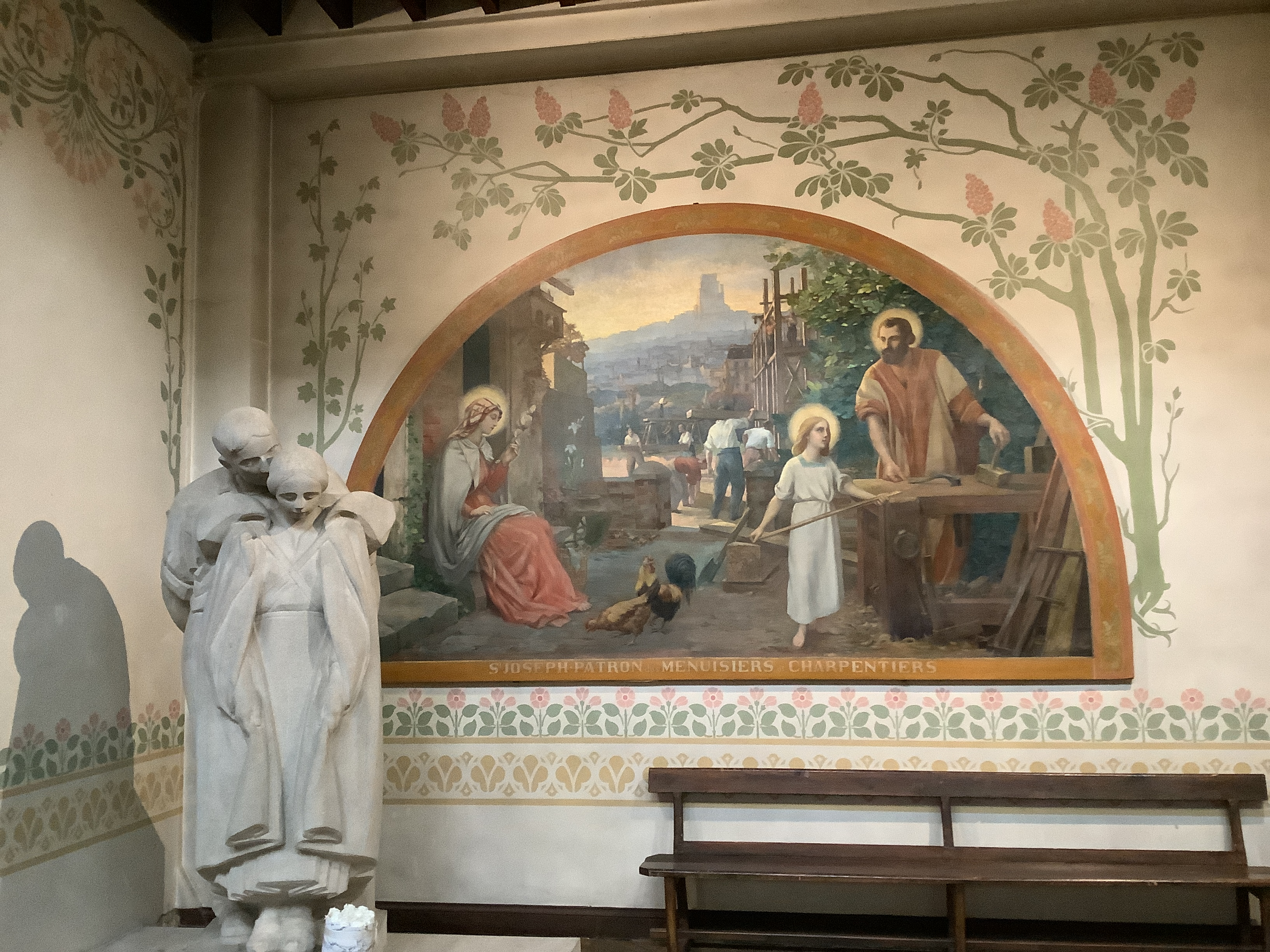
Holy Family Chapel, painting "Holy Family at work" and Sculpture of "The fountain of the shepherds" by Henri Proszynski (1930s)

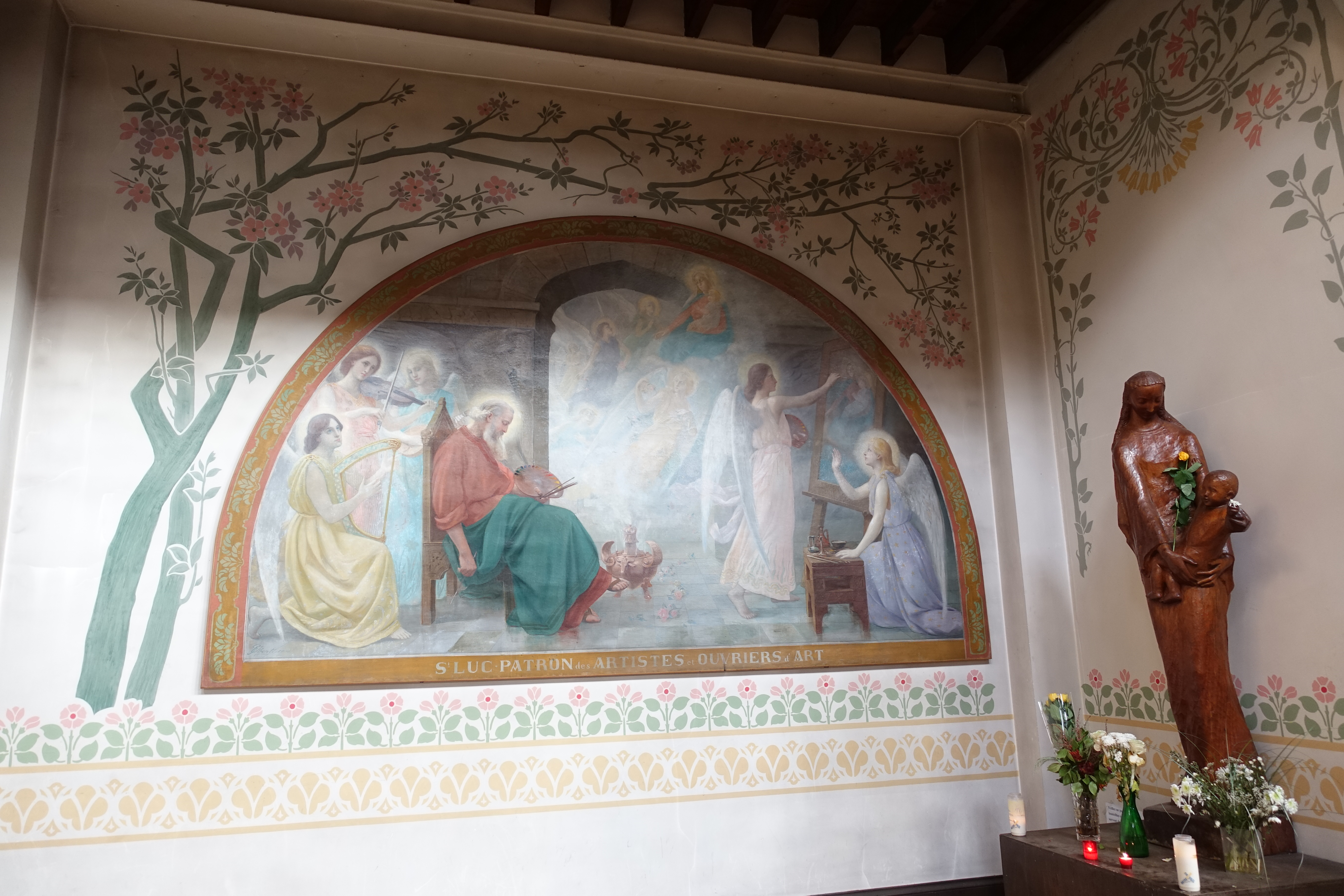
Chapel of Saint Luke, "Saint Luke with angels", sculpture "The Virgin of the Flowers" by Georges Serroz (1883-1964)

Long galleries run the length of the walls of the nave, below the high stained glass windows, which are mostly white glass, to admit more light. The arcades along the collateral aisles hold a series small chapels, each decorated with paintings and sculpture. While the structure of the interior is modern, the decoration around the paintings reflects the Art Nouveau style floral designs of the period, with lavish use of floral designs on the walls and around the art.

== The Baptistry ==
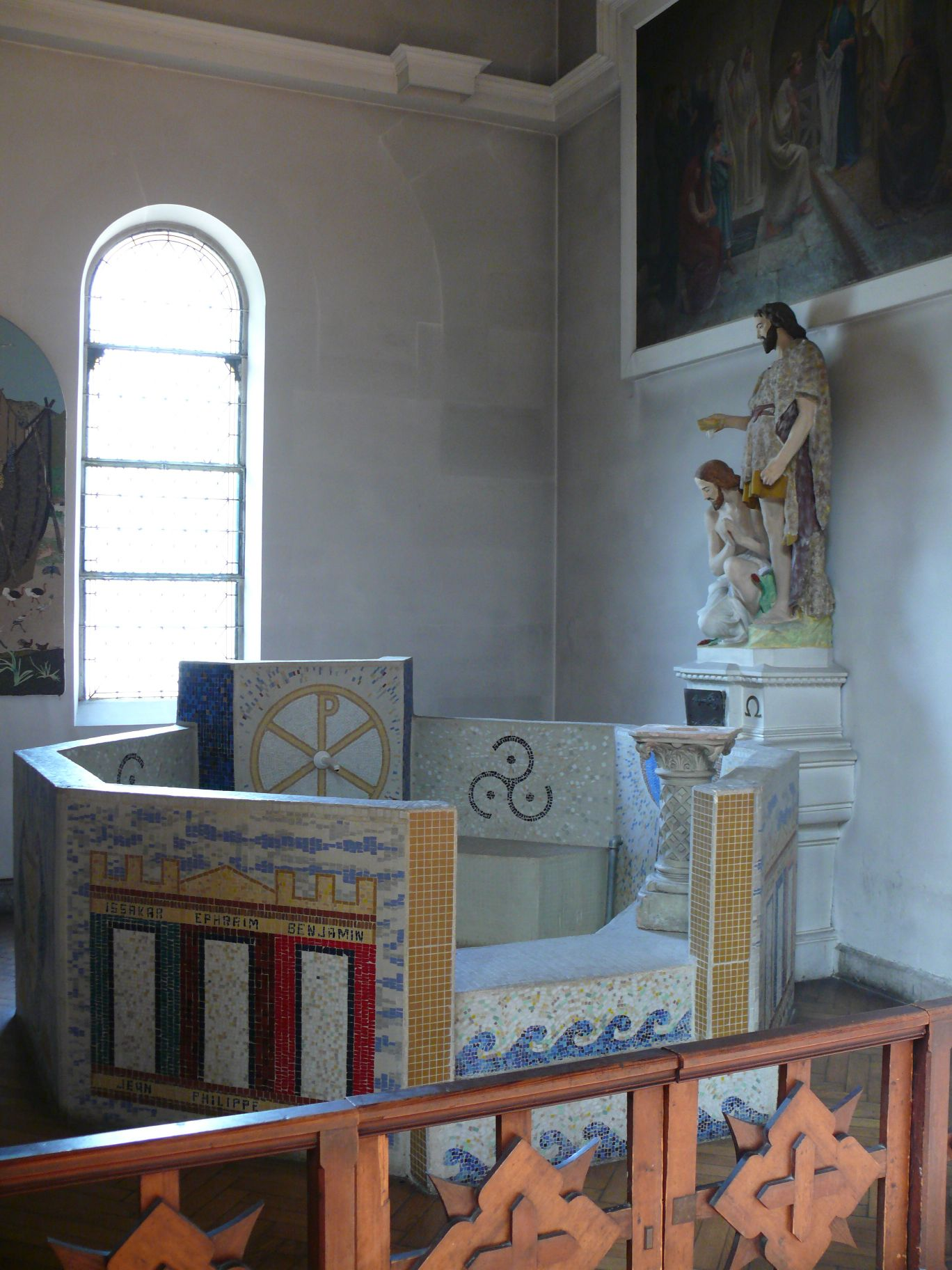
The Baptistry

The Baptistry was created for the traditional full immersion of the person baptized. It designed by the Taileferts, husband and wife artists, with modern decoration added in 1985 by Casare Bizi (1934-2005) The walls and furnishings of the Baptistry are full of symbols, taken from the very early periods of Christianity, when artists avoided direct depictions of God or Christ. These include the use of the "Chrisme", a combination of Greek letters representing the name of Christ; a dove, representing the Holy Spirit, and a hand reaching down symbolzing the hand of God. The steps leading down to the water are black, to represent how the word of God washes away the forces of evil; the sides are red, to represent the force of love. An ambon is placed behind the water, decorated with symbols of "The Word" and "The Christ, the Verb of God".

=== Sculpture ===
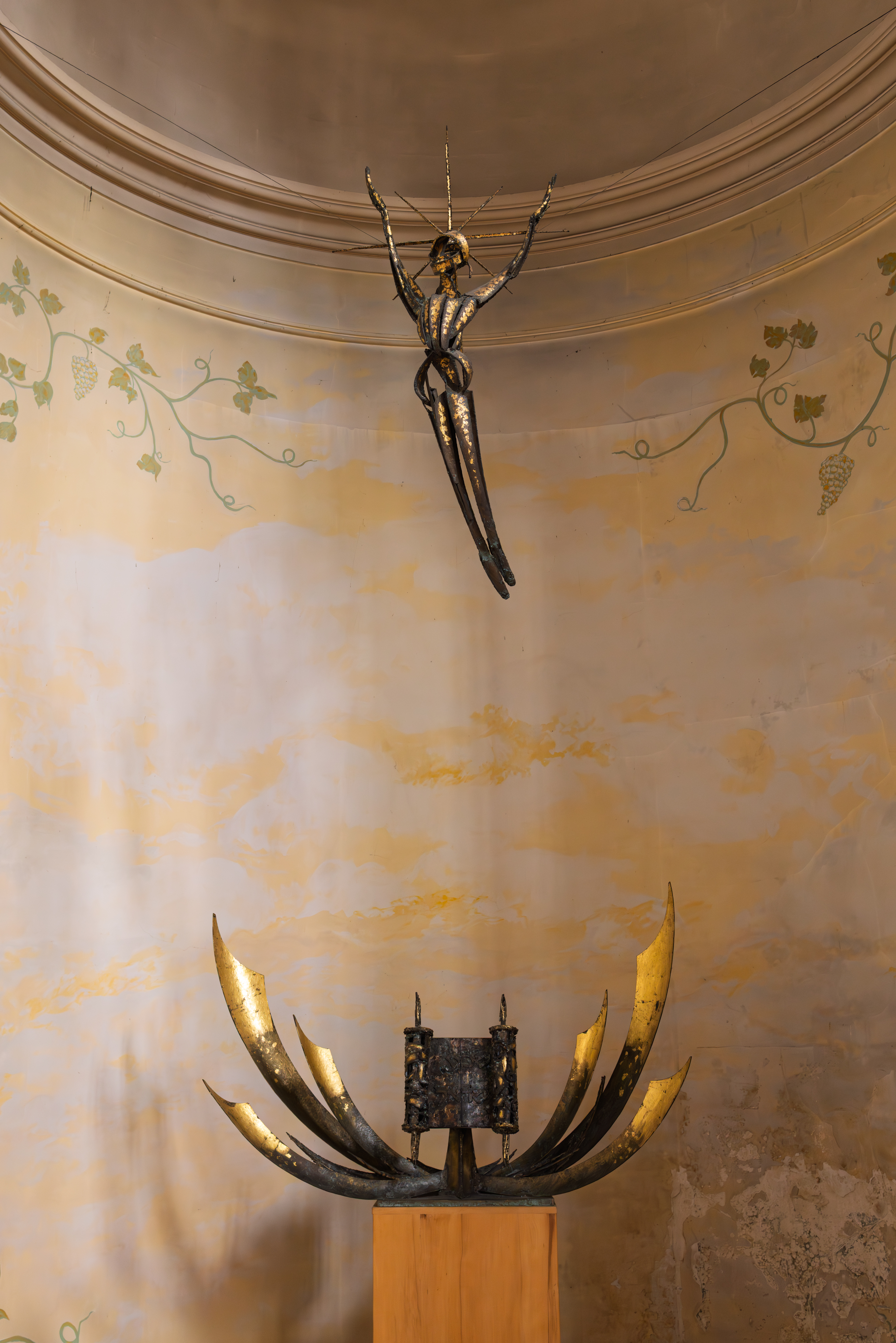
"Christ in Glory" above, "Fire of God" below, in Tabernacle, by Jean-Jacques Bris (20th c.)

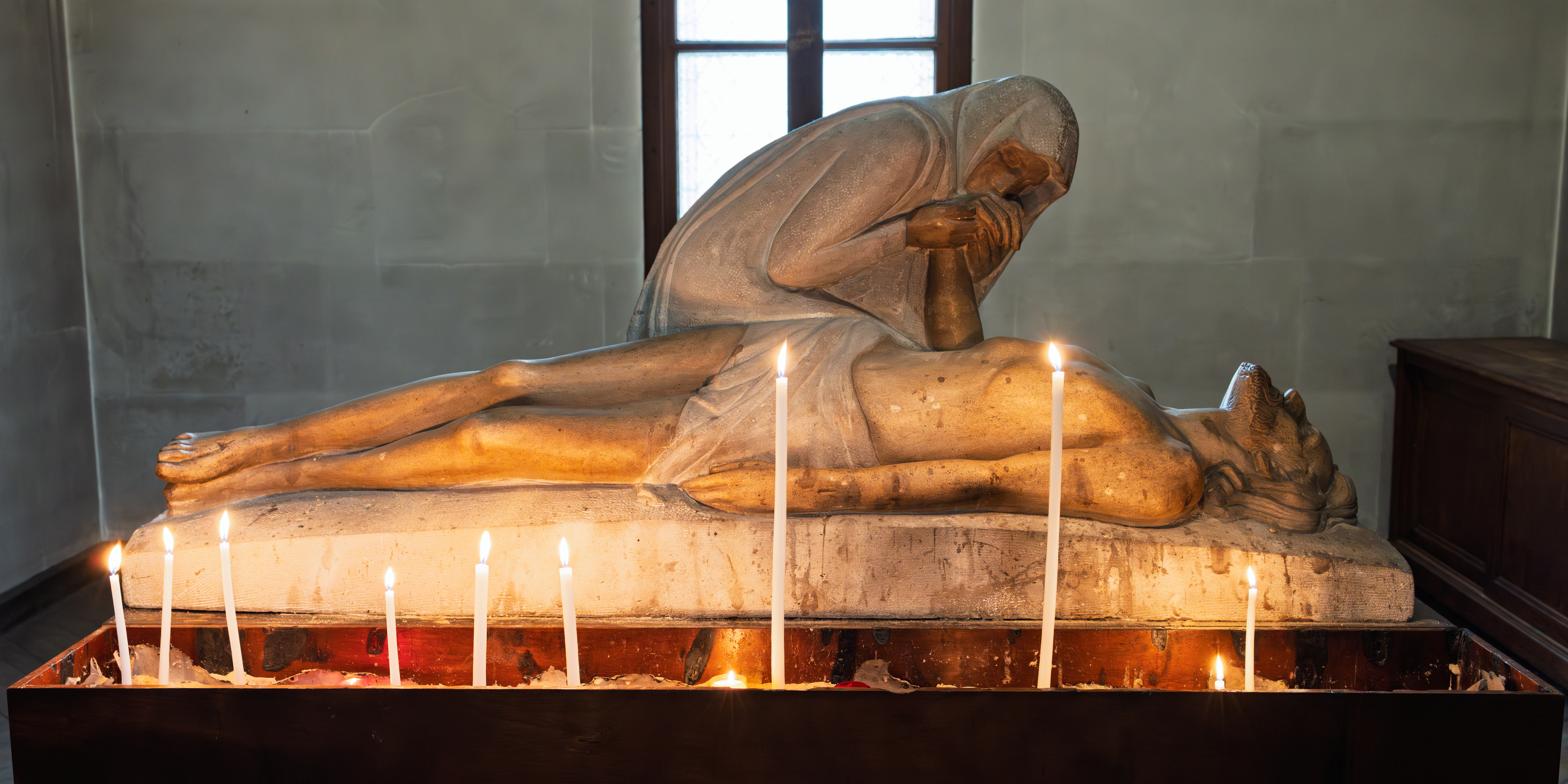
Pieta sculpture of Christ and the Virgin Mary by Georges Serraz (1883-1964) in la chapelle des Défunts

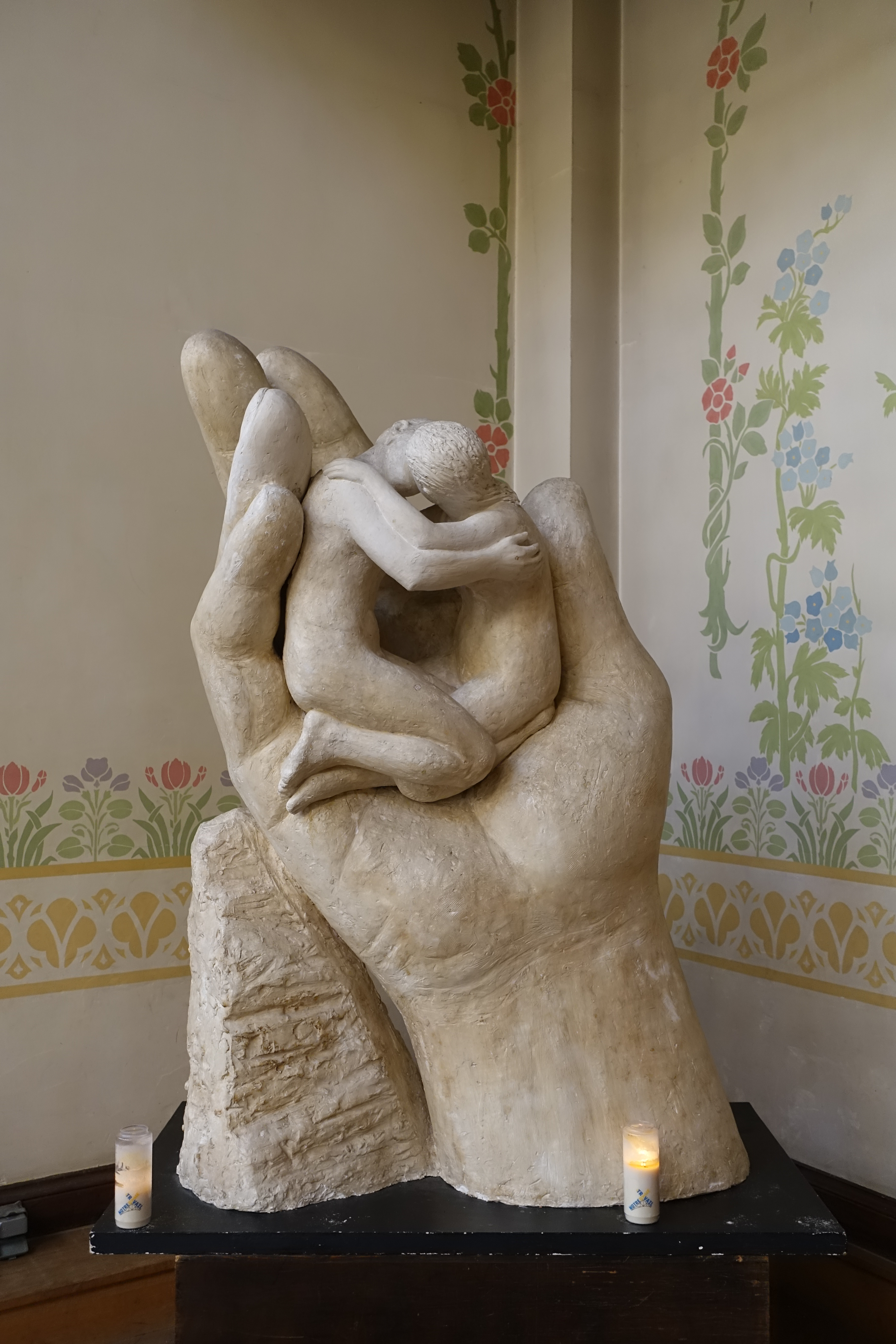
"The hand of the Creator" by Michel Serraz (20th c)

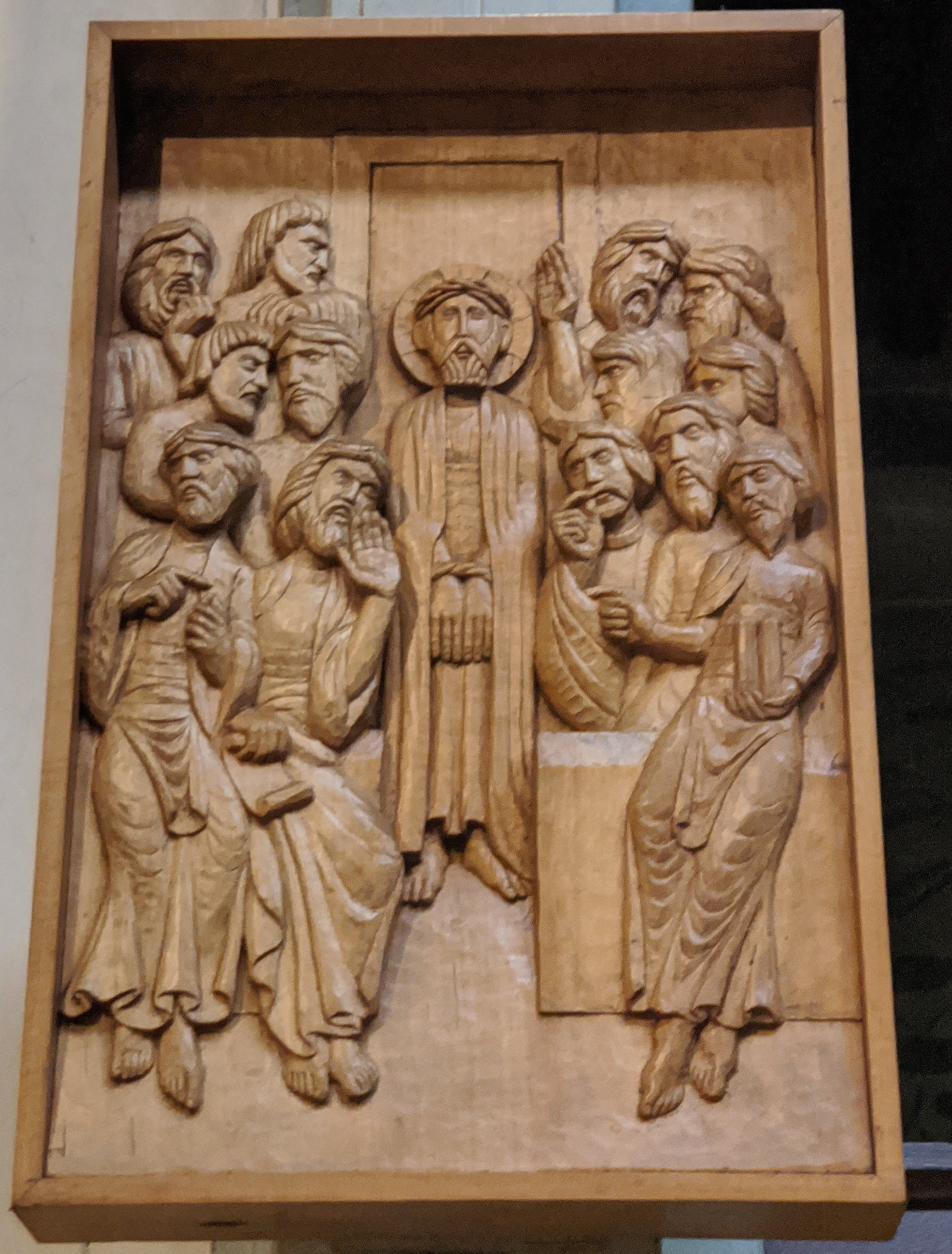
First step of the "Stations of the Cross", with fourteen figures (20th c.)

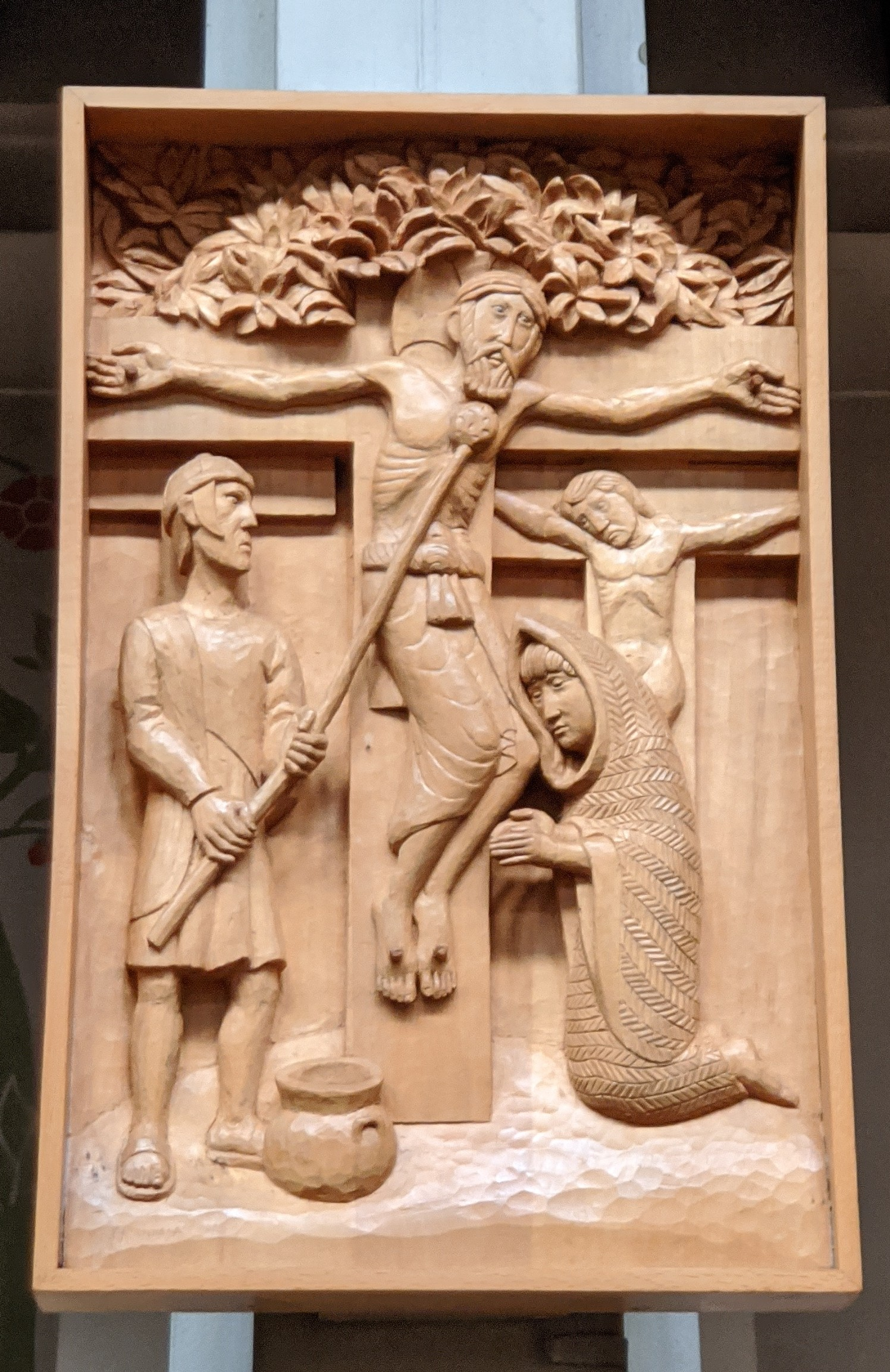
"Stations of the Cross", Step Eleven

The chapels display a variety of works of sculpture, in styles ranging from neo-classical to modern.

The tabernacle next to the Chapel of the Virgin contains two modern sculptures by Jean-Jacques Bris. At the bottom is "The Fire of God", depicting the presentation to Moses of the first chapters of the scripture, surrounded by a sacred fire representing the biblical Burning Bush, where the chapters were first presented to Moses. Above the fire is a statue of Christ in Glory, on the cross of the crucifixion floating in the air, A notable modern work in the church is a group of fourteen small carved wooden plaques (53 by 24 centimetres), in the neo-Romaneque style, placed on the steel columns in the nave. They illustrate the events of the Crucifixion and Resurrection of Christ. Crowded with stylized figures, they were made by Christine Audin (born 1960).

=== Stained Glass ===
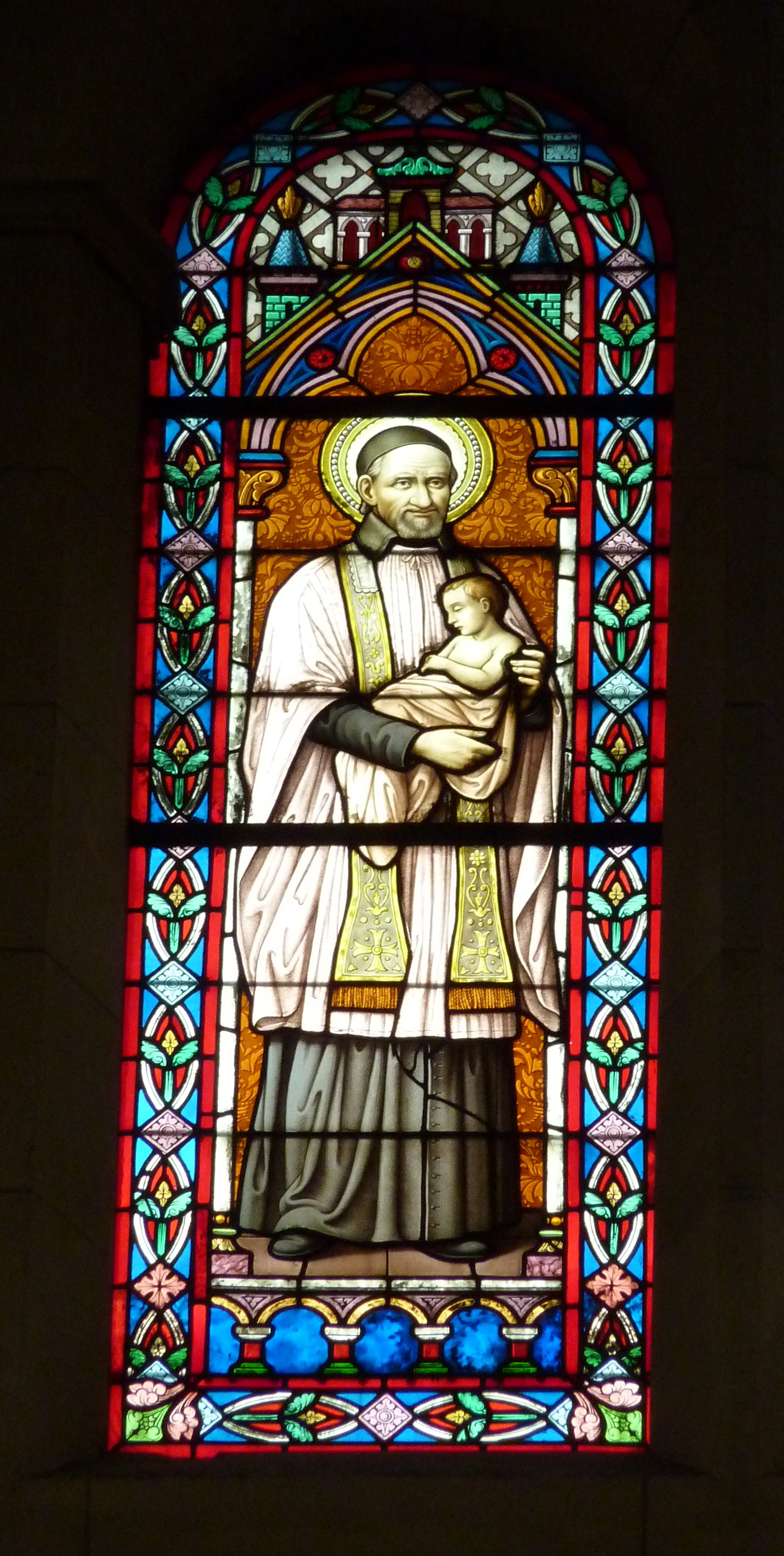
Chapel window, Saint Vincent de Paul

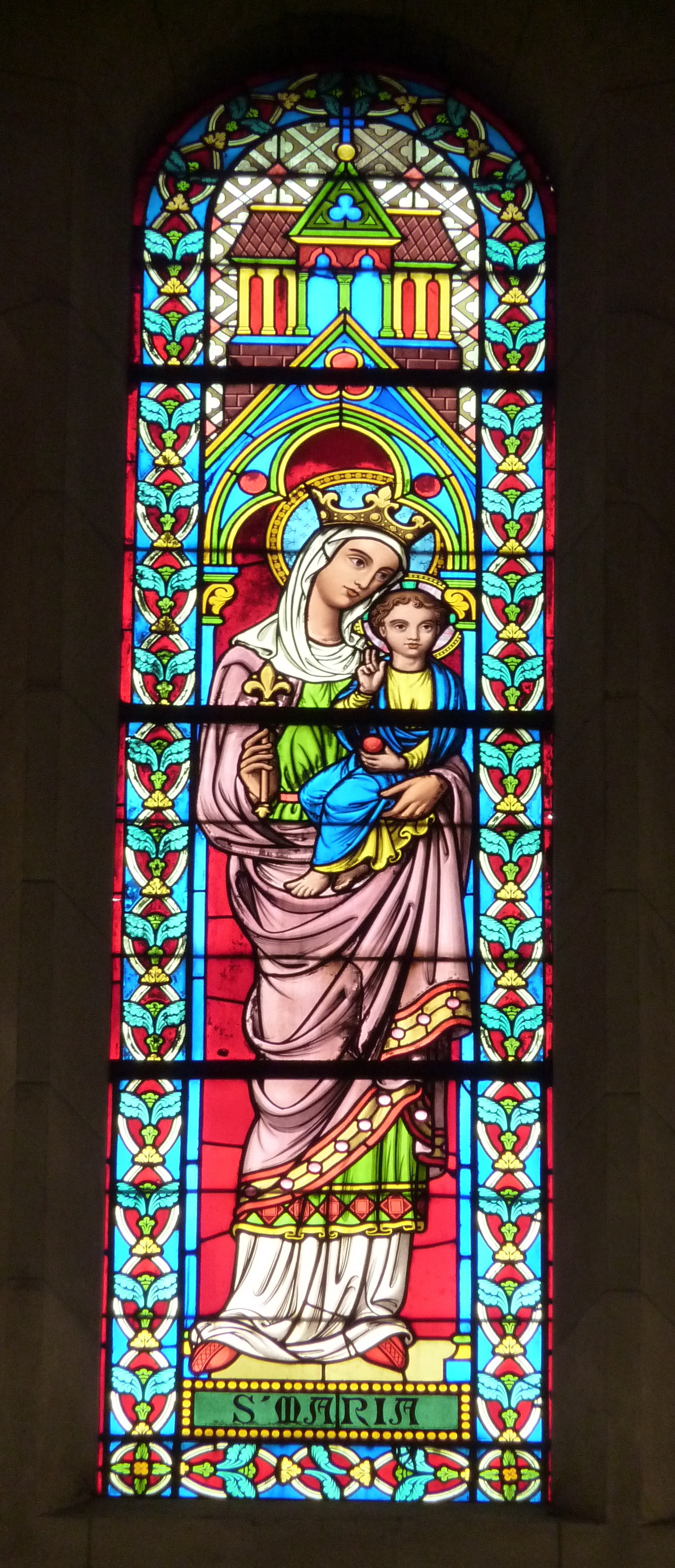
Chapel window, Virgin Mary and child

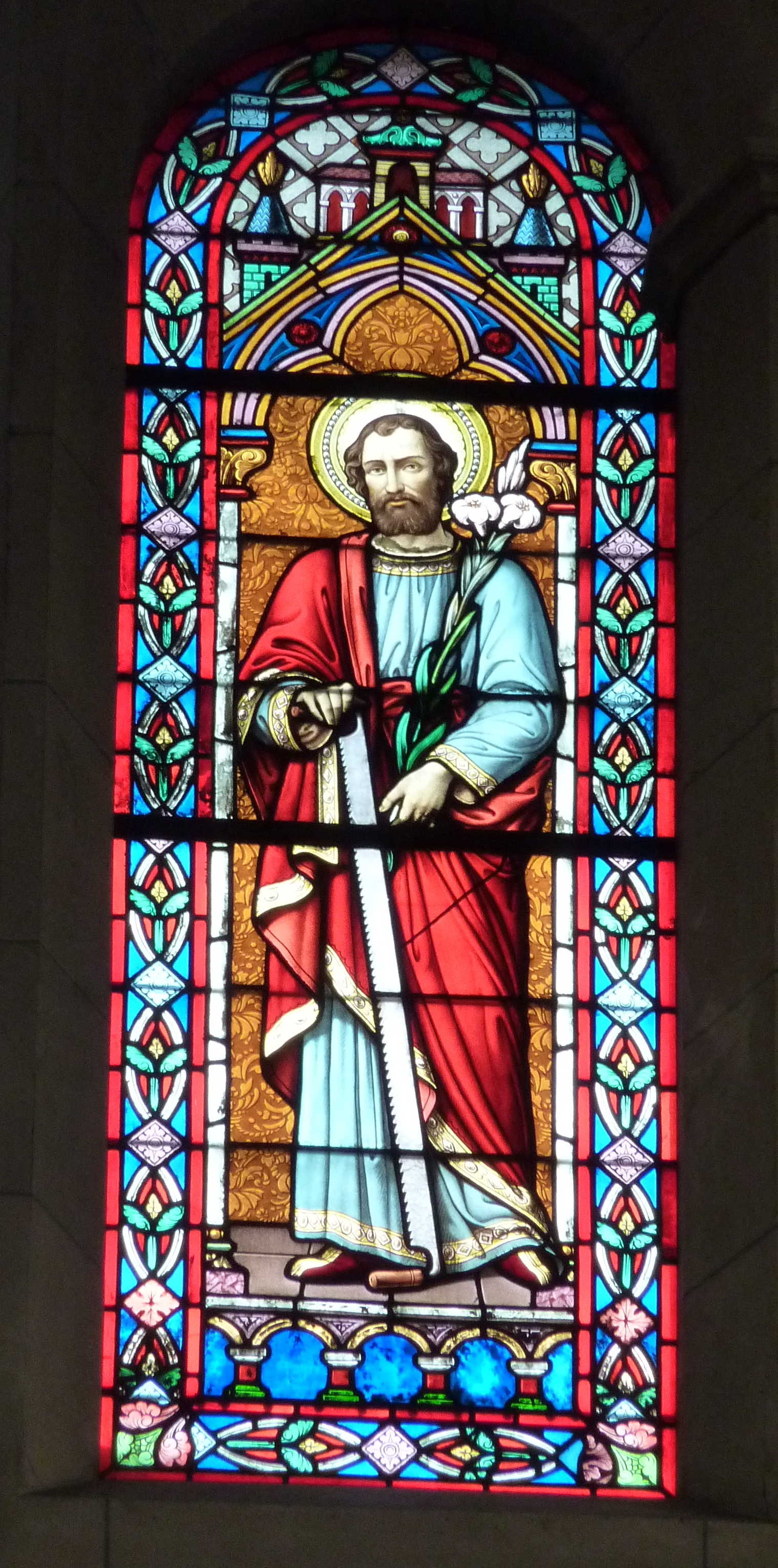
Chapel window, Saint Joseph

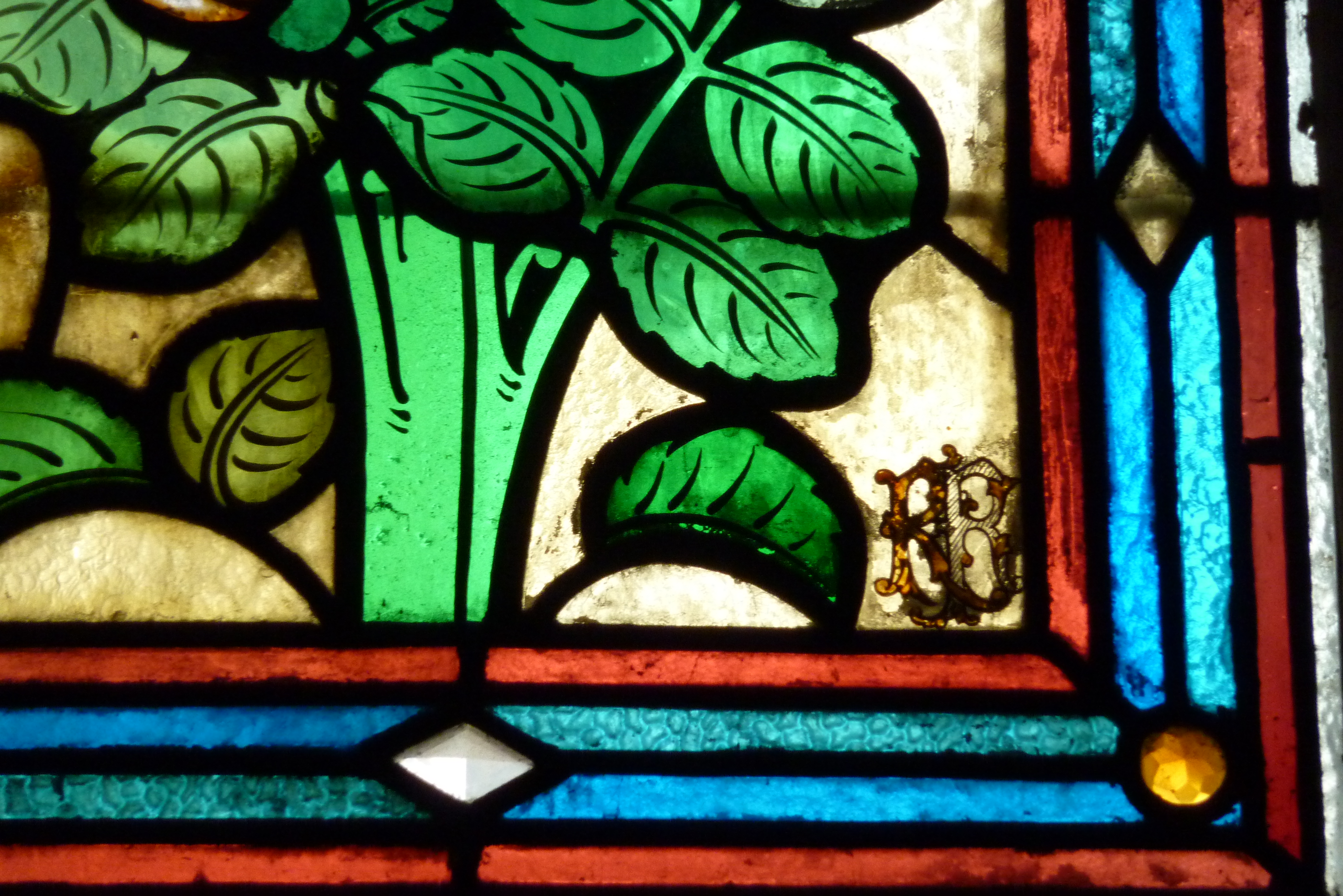
Detail of floral window, with signature

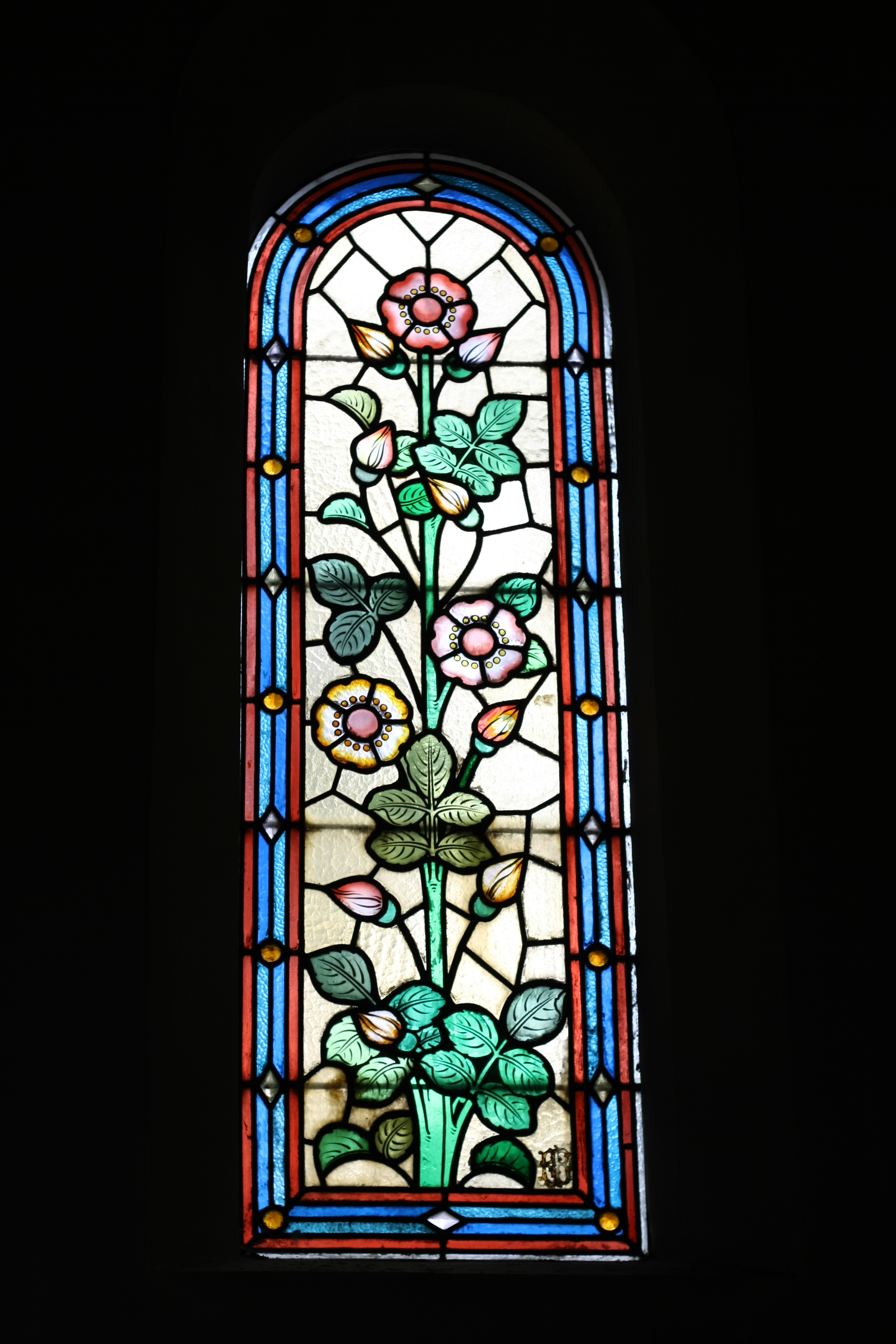
Chapel window, floral design

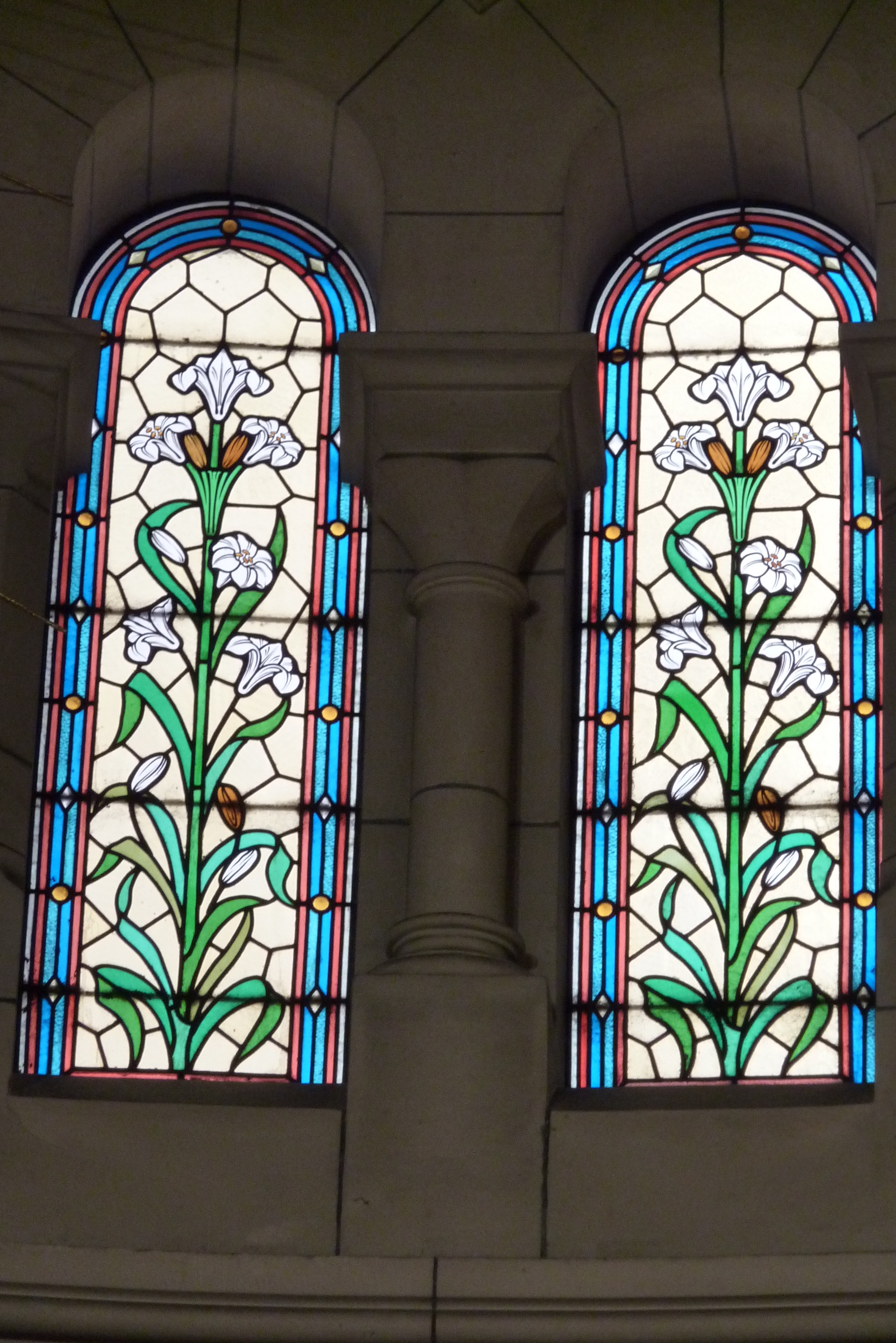
Floral windows

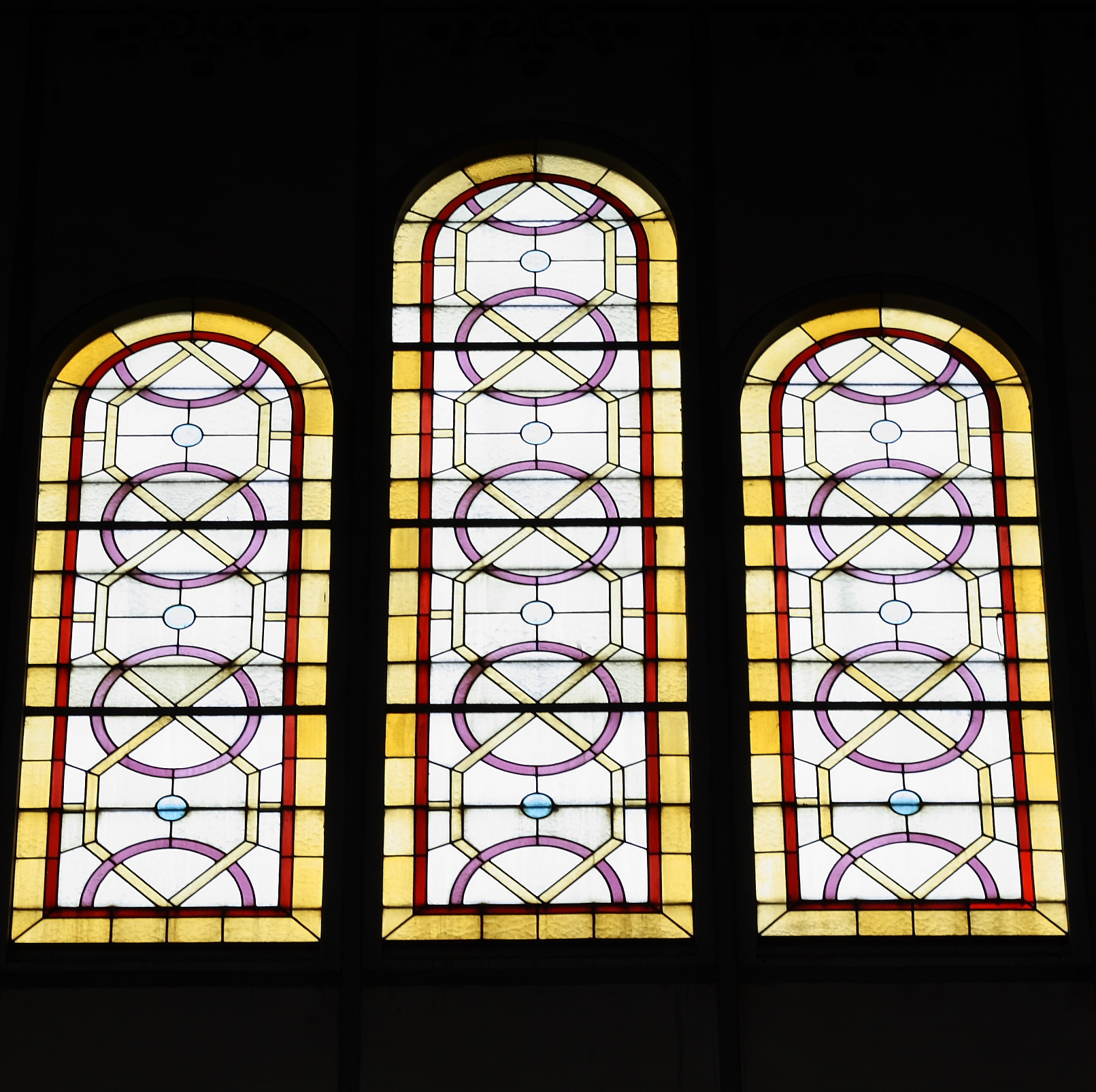
Abstract upper level windows

=== Decorative art and furnishings ===
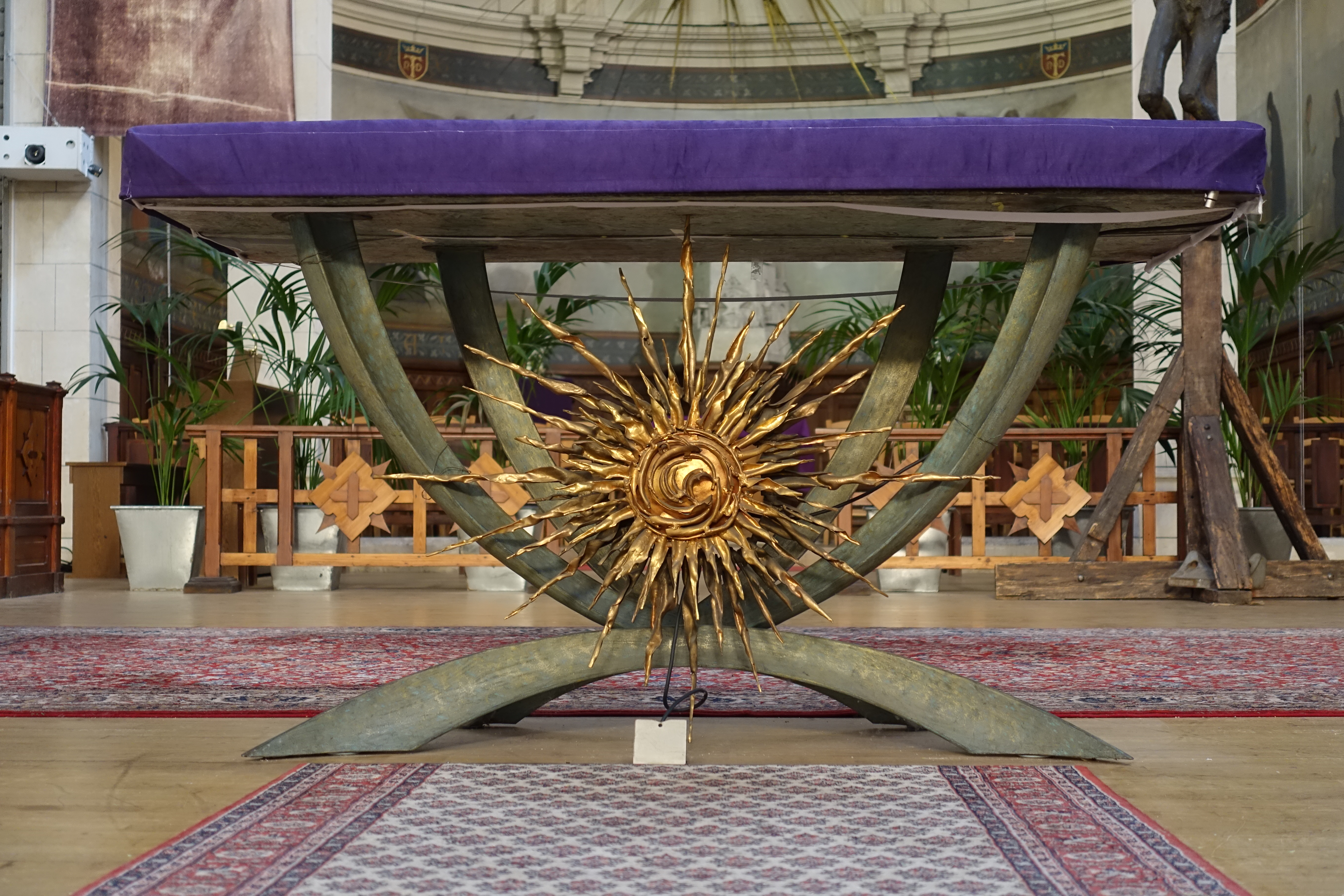
The altar in the Choir, by Jean-Jacques Bris (20th c.)

== The Organ ==
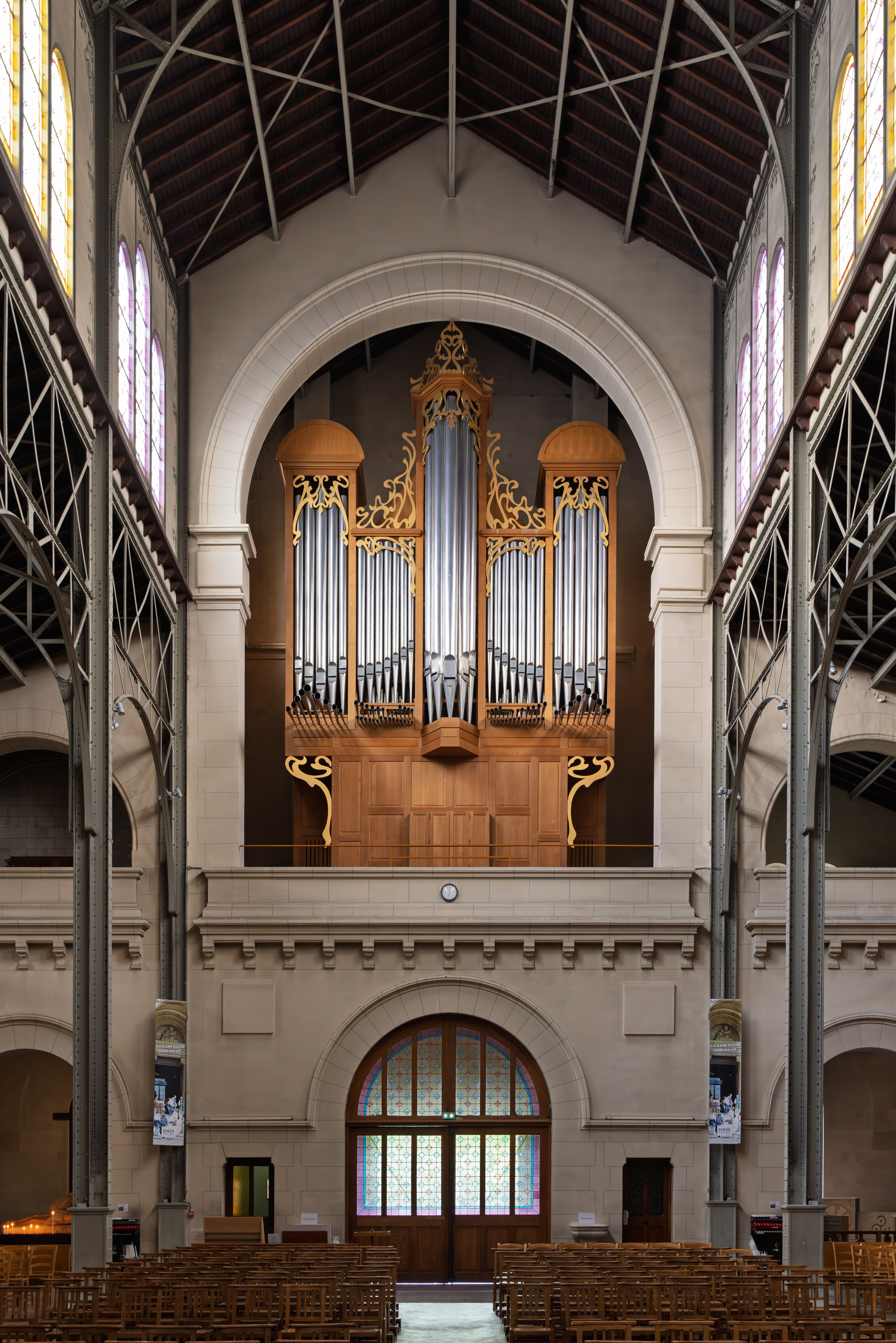
The grand organ in the tribune

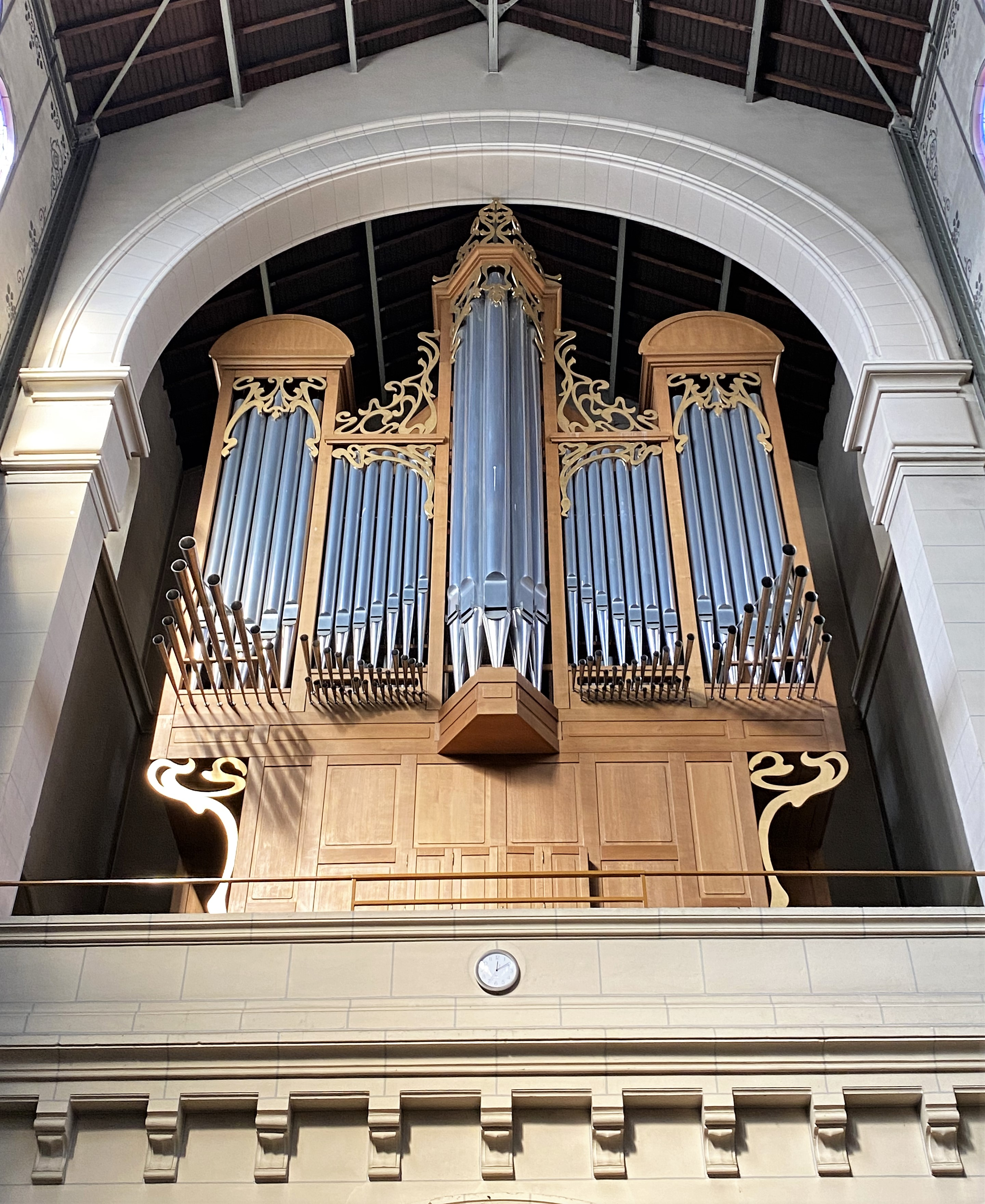
The grand organ

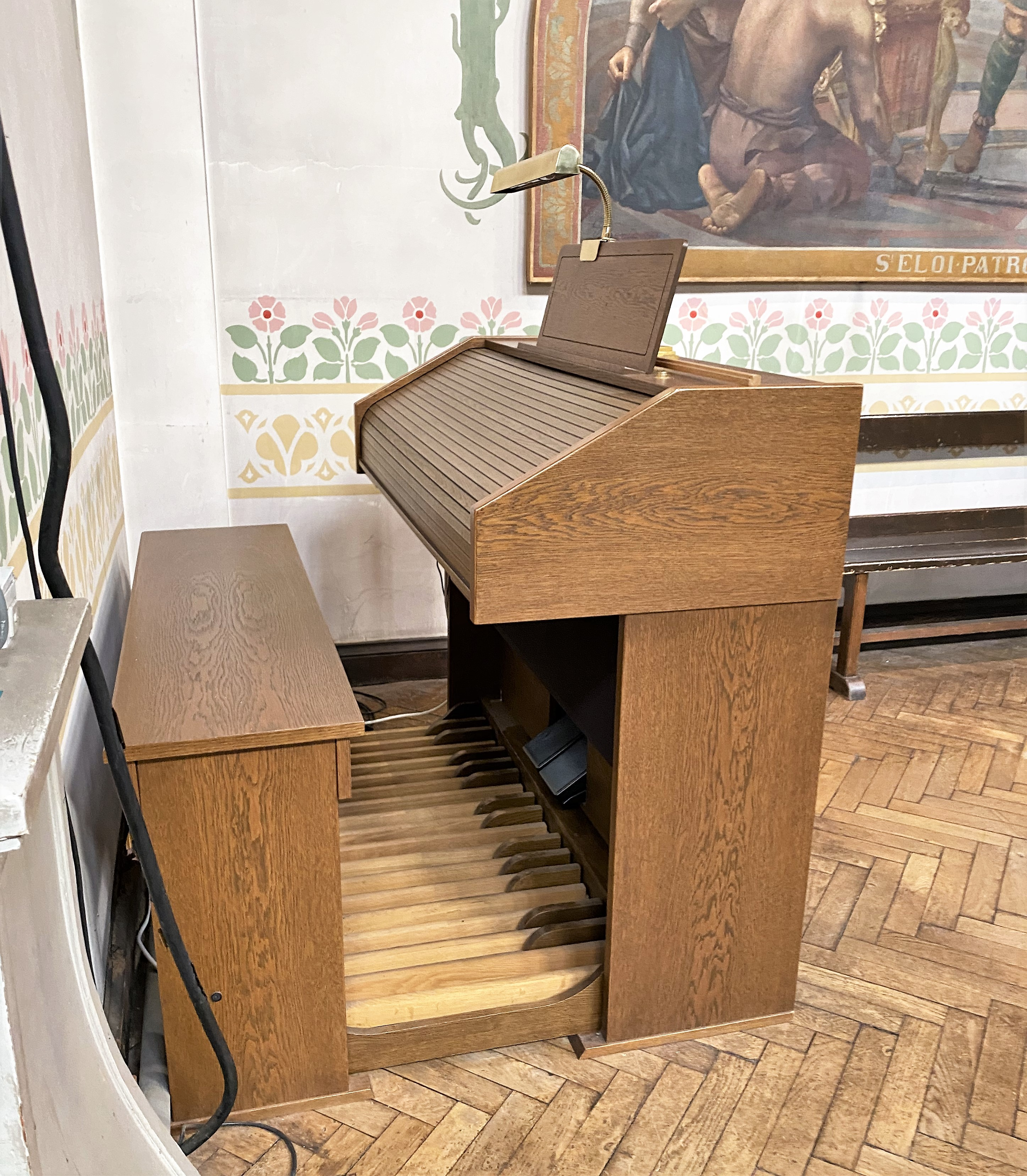
The remote keyboard located in the nave

The grand organ is modern, built in 1991 by the firm of Haepfer and installed in the tribune at entrance to the Nave. It has sixty-one notes on the regular keyboard, sixty-one expressive notes, and thirty-two pedals. It has an unusual feature; it has two separate consoles or keyboards;, one located in the tribune with the organ, with a traditional mechanical connection to the instrument, and a second mobile keyboard which is located in the nave. The mobile keyboard has three keyboards and thirty-two foot pedals, which are connected by a multiplex system to the organ. It can play all the same notes as the traditional keyboard, as well as additional expressive notes that are specific to it.

== Sources ==
- "Guide de visite, Notre-Dame-du Travail - Art, Culture et Foi", under direction of Fr. François Potez, published by church in 2022 viewed in 2023
- Dupré, Cécile (2009). "Notre-Dame-du-Travail (Paris), une église au tournant du XIXe siècle et du XXe siècle". In Situ (Online). 11 – via OpenEdition Journals.
