= Fleet =

Fleet may refer to:

== Vehicles ==
- Fishing fleet
- Naval fleet
- Fleet vehicles, a pool of motor vehicles
- Fleet Aircraft, the aircraft manufacturing company

== Places ==
=== Canada ===
- Fleet, Alberta, Canada, a hamlet

=== England ===
- Fleet (Kent), a term for a waterway in the Thames marshes, England
- The Fleet (Tees), a section of the River Tees' original route
- Fleet, Dorset, England, a village and civil parish
- Fleet, Hampshire, England, a town and civil parish
- Fleet, Hayling Island, Hampshire, England, a hamlet
- Fleet, Lincolnshire, England
- The Fleet Lagoon, at Chesil Beach, Dorset
- Fleet Pond, Hampshire, England
- River Fleet, subterranean river in London, England
  - Fleet Street, named after the river
  - Fleet Prison, named after the river
  - Fleet Line, named after the river, was the original name for the London Underground Jubilee line

=== Scotland ===
- Fleet Bay, a part of a National Scenic Area within Dumfries and Galloway, Scotland
- Water of Fleet, a river in Scotland

=== United States ===
- Fleet, Kentucky, US, an unincorporated community

== In business ==
- ARC Centre of Excellence in Future Low-Energy Electronics Technologies (a.k.a. FLEET), Australian physics research collaboration developing ultra-low-energy electronics
- Blain's Farm & Fleet, American farm and ranch supply store chain
- Fleet (laxative), brand name for Bisacodyl
- Fleet Aircraft, a Canadian manufacturer of aircraft from 1928 to 1957
- FleetBoston Financial, a financial institution also known as Fleet Bank
- Fleet Farm, American farm and ranch supply store chain
- Fleet services, an English motorway service station
- Fleet Space Technologies, an Australian company led by Flavia Tata Nardini

== People ==
- Fleet (surname), includes a list of people with the name
- Moses Fleetwood Walker (1856-1924), nicknamed "Fleet", American baseball player

== Other uses ==
- Ebbsfleet United F.C., an English football team whose nickname is "The Fleet"
- The Fleet series of shared universe science fiction anthologies edited by David Drake and Bill Fawcett
- Fleet (horse)
- Fleets, a discontinued disappearing messaging feature of the Twitter platform
- Wilmington Clippers (1937–1950), an American football team nicknamed "The Fleet"
- Fleet, an IDE developed by JetBrains
- Boston Fleet, a women's hockey team
- San Diego Fleet, a defunct American football team

== See also ==
- The Fleet (disambiguation)
- First fleet (disambiguation)
- Second Fleet (disambiguation)
- Third Fleet (disambiguation)
- Fourth Fleet (disambiguation)
- Fifth Fleet (disambiguation)
- Sixth Fleet (disambiguation)
- Seventh Fleet (disambiguation)
- 8th Fleet (disambiguation)
- 9th Fleet
