= Carhartt =

American workwear brand

Carhartt, Inc.

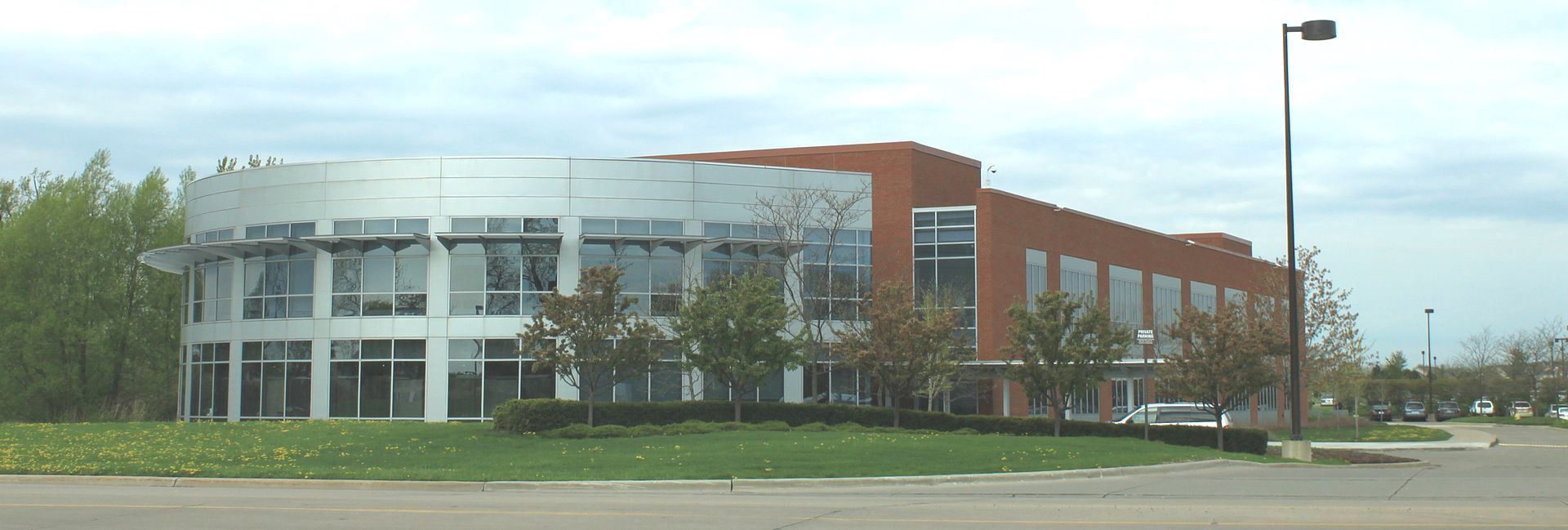
- Carhartt headquarters
- Type: Private
- Industry: Workwear
- Founded: 1889; 137 years ago
- Headquarters: Dearborn, Michigan, U.S.
- Key people: Mark Valade (Executive Chairman) and Linda Hubbard (President & CEO)
- Revenue: US$1.8 billion (2024)
- Number of employees: 5,500
- Website: www.carhartt.com

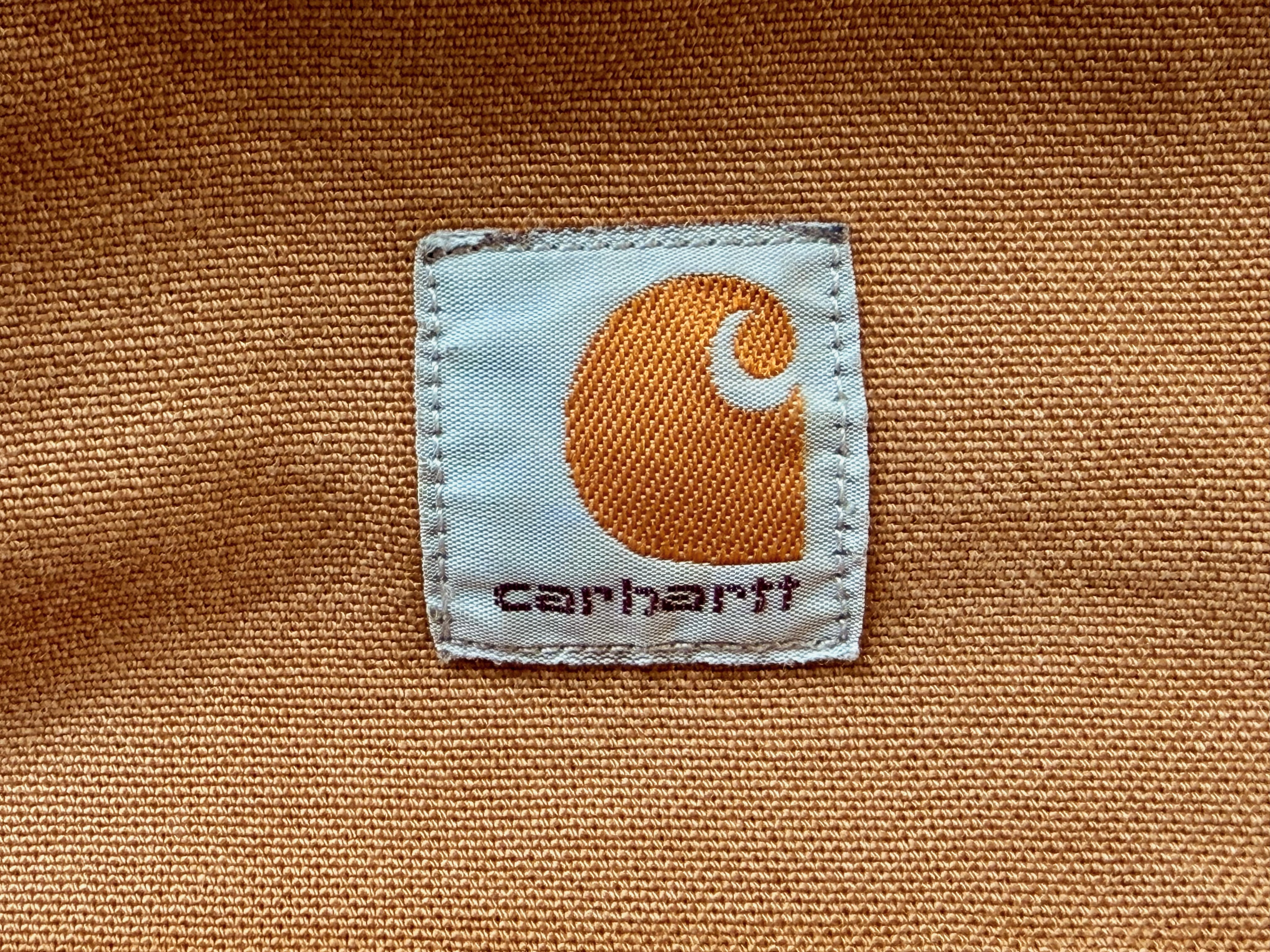
Carhartt tab on a pair of Rugged Flex Duck trousers

Carhartt, Inc. is an American clothing company founded in 1889, known for heavy-duty work wear such as jackets, coats, overalls, coveralls, vests, shirts, jeans, dungarees, fire-resistant clothing and hunting apparel. Carhartt remains a family-owned company, owned by the descendants of founder Hamilton Carhartt, with its headquarters in Dearborn, Michigan. It is known for its slogan "True to This".

== Founding and history ==
Carhartt was founded by Hamilton Carhartt in 1889 in Detroit, Michigan, to make work clothing for manual laborers. The company started with two sewing machines and five workers. Carhartt's first slogan was "Honest value for an honest dollar." The company's initial expansion in the 1890s focused on railroad workers' need for strong and long-lasting work clothes. Carhartt worked closely with local railroad workers to ensure that his work bibs met their needs. Within 20 years of its founding, Carhartt had expanded its facilities into eight other cities, including locations in the United Kingdom and Canada. Carhartt downsized due to declining sales during the Great Depression, but experienced a resurgence in World War II.

Over the years, Carhartt clothing items evolved trademark features intended to extend durability, including the use of heavy-duty thread, reinforcing rivets at stress points, and a variety of durable, high-technology materials resistant to flame, abrasion, stains, and water. Today, Carhartt clothing is commonly found on construction sites, farms and ranches, among other job sites.

Carhartt had total sales of $92 million in 1990. As of 1992, Carhartt sold more than two million jackets per year. As of 2013, Carhartt had sales of about $600 million per year.

== Products ==
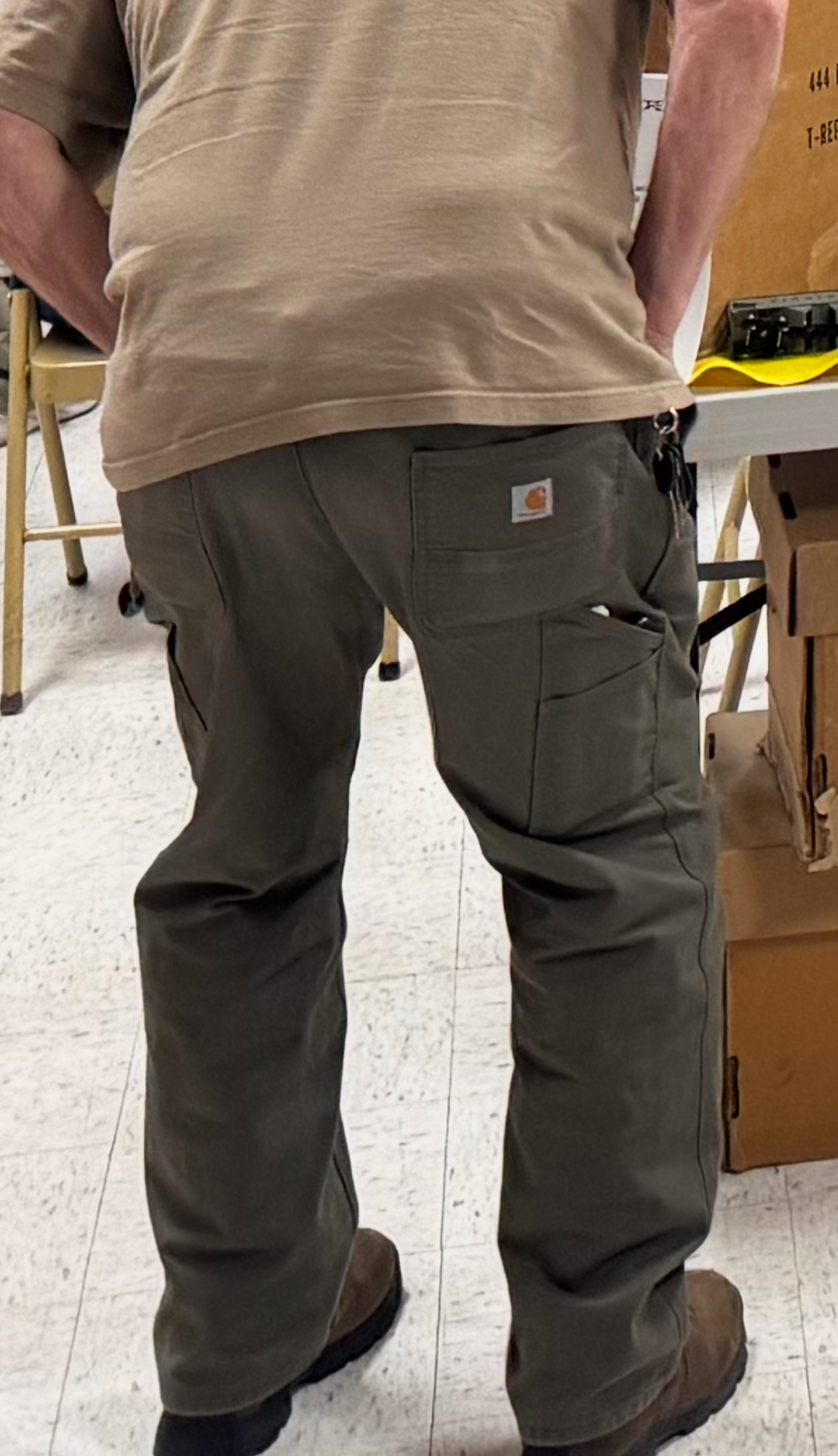
Carhartt Carpenter Pants in the color "Moss"

Carhartt is renowned for its full-cut, wind-resistant, snag-proof, heavy-duty work jackets popular with construction workers, miners, farmers, hunters, and outdoors enthusiasts. Carhartt has also successfully expanded its appeal to general street wear. Carhartt jackets are plain and manufactured in muted colors such as mustard, khaki, and navy blue. They are usually waist-length or three-quarter length. Most are made from relatively stiff 12-ounce cotton canvas with triple-stitched seams. Carhartt also makes pants and overalls with colors and materials that match its jackets. Carhartt jackets are not designed for unusually tall or slender men; they are typically cut wide around the middle to accommodate hefty men.

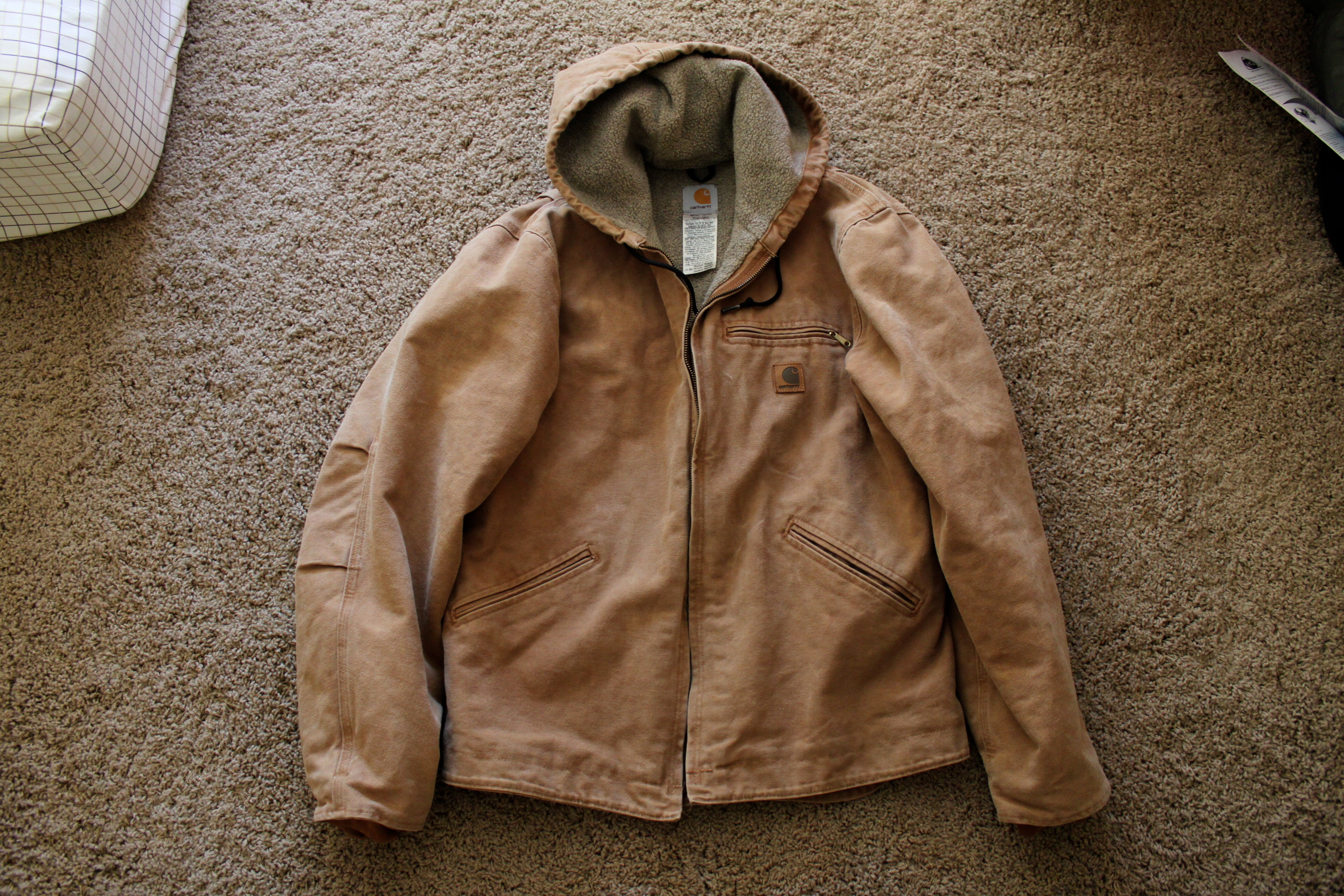
Carhartt jacket

In 2007, the company launched the Carhartt for Women line of women's workwear for the fall season.

=== Collaborations ===
Collaborations from 2013 also include lines from Adam Kimmel × Carhartt, as well as collections through the A.P.C. × Carhartt line. Both collections used fashion designers, Adam Kimmel and Jean Touitou.

=== Carhartt Silverado ===
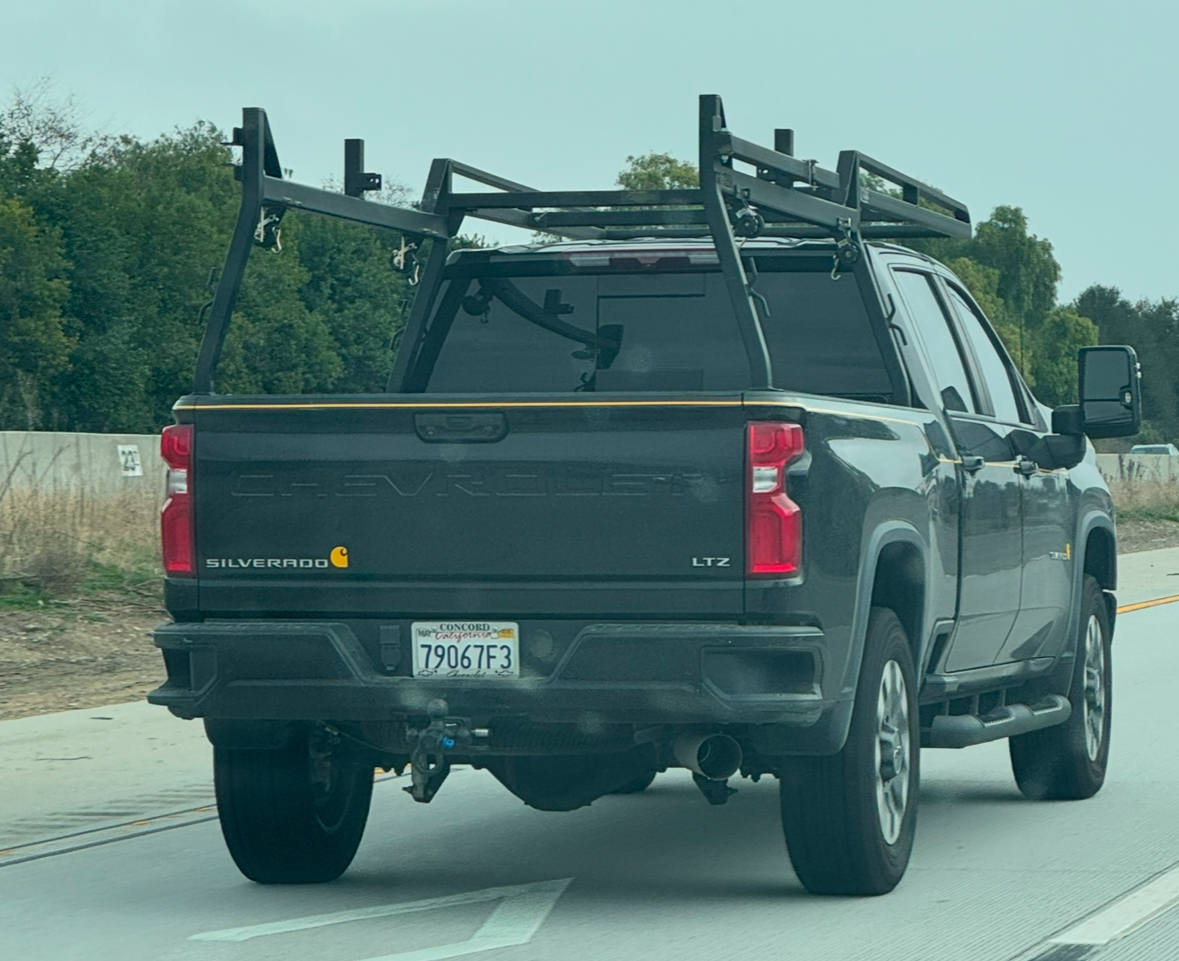
A Carhartt x Chevrolet Silverado

Carhartt partnered with Chevrolet to create the Carhartt Silverado, a special edition truck featuring design elements inspired by Carhartt’s workwear. This version of the Silverado included a custom interior with brown seat covers, Carhartt branding, and all-weather floor liners. The collaboration aimed to reflect the rugged and practical qualities associated with both brands.

In 2014, Carhartt launched a craft beer in cooperation with Michigan brewery New Holland Brewing (The Carhartt Woodsman).

== Work in Progress (WIP) ==
Swiss couple Edwin and Salomée Faeh, fashion designers specializing in denim, discussed representing Carhartt in Europe when they visited the United States in 1989, the centenary of the company's founding. They started by selling Carhartt's authentic workwear. In 1994, they were granted a license to create their own lines of clothing under the name Carhartt Work in Progress (WIP). WIP is the streetwear version of the Carhartt brand, often marketed as comparable to Stüssy or Supreme.

Carhartt WIP often collaborates with other streetwear brands. An example is the line of A Bathing Ape x Carhartt WIP camouflage hoodies and jackets. There have also been collaborations with A.P.C., Comme des Garçons, Vetements, Junya Watanabe, Nike, Pontus Alv's Polar Skate Co, Gosha Rubchinskiy and Tolya Titaev's skate brand PACCBET. The WIP founders' strategy was to immerse themselves in subcultures that interested them and pursue marketing activities specific to those communities. This included graffiti, fanzines, skateboarding, hip-hop, and a BMX cycle team. Carhartt WIP have a number of stores in Europe (including Paris, Milan, London, and Barcelona), Asia, Australia and also in the U.S. (New York City and Los Angeles).

== Operations and corporate affairs ==
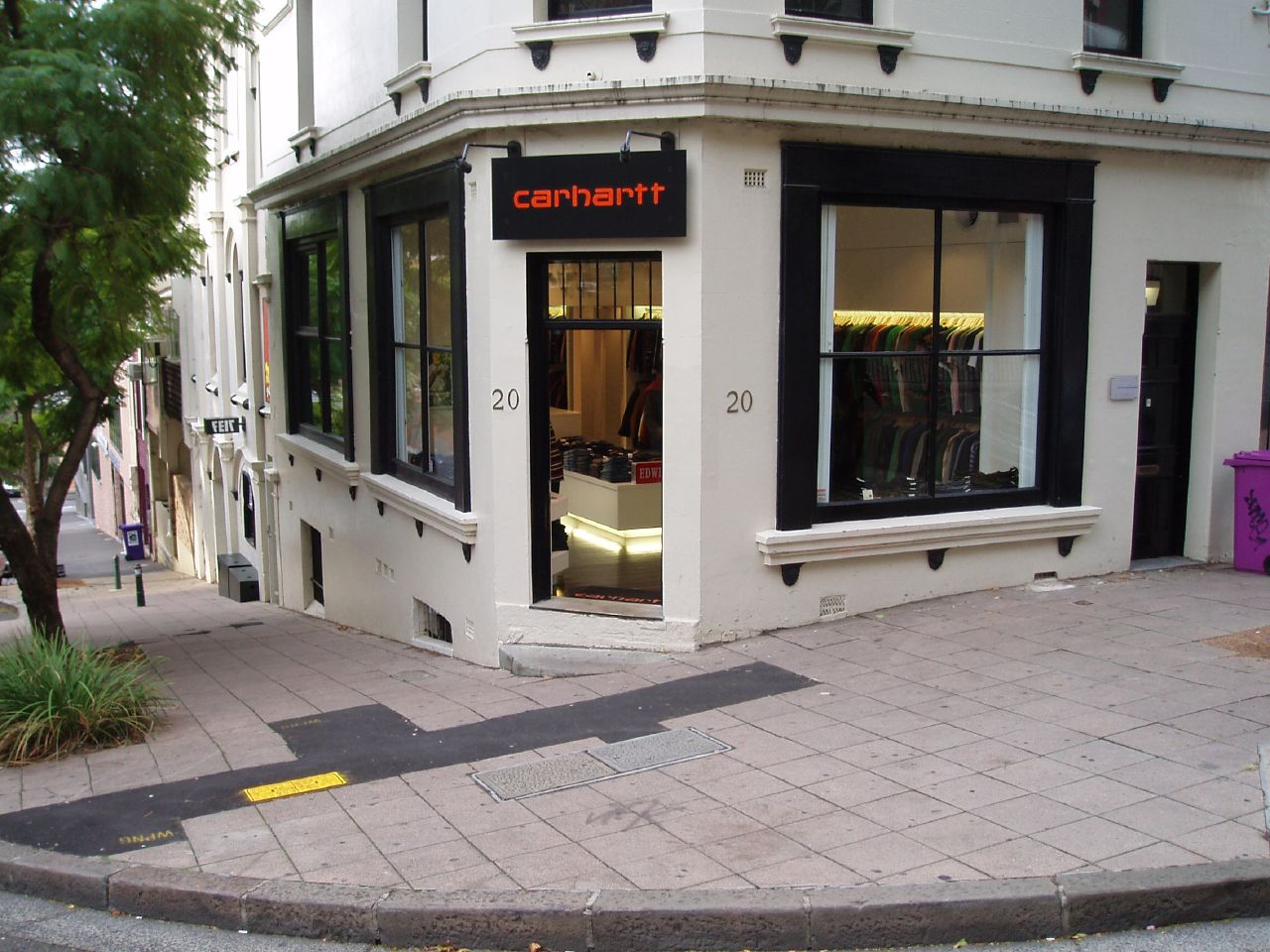
Carhartt store in Sydney, Australia

Carhartt is still a privately held, family-owned company, owned by the descendants of founder Hamilton Carhartt.

Carhartt owns and operates its manufacturing base in Mexico as well as a number of unionized factories and distribution centers in the United States. Carhartt offers a "Union-Made in USA" line of workwear through its retailers. The company has four factories in the United States. The firm also makes an effort to use domestic suppliers: in 2015, Carhartt purchased 19.5 million pounds of cotton from Georgia, as well as 32 million buttons and 1 million drawcords, both made in Kentucky.

The manufacturing of many of Carhartt's non-core apparel items have been outsourced to countries including China and Mexico. Carhartt requires its international suppliers to be Worldwide Responsible Accredited Production (WRAP) certified.

As of 2003, Carhartt operated four factories in two Mexican states employing about 2,000 workers. In 1997, Carhartt built a plant in Pénjamo, state of Guanajuato, Mexico, and in December 2001 opened a second plant about 30 miles away, in Irapuato. In 2003, Carhartt purchased two additional facilities from the Labor Board of the state of Durango in an auction. All of Carhartt's Mexican plants have WRAP certification. In 2003 Carhartt opened another plant in Penjamo, in the former HD Lee building.

Mexico’s facilities closed their doors in 2023.

Carhartt EMEA (Europe, Middle East and Africa) was formed in 2004 to provide workwear to the European market.

== Sales and advertising ==
Large regional farm stores like Blain's Farm & Fleet, Fleet Farm and Tractor Supply Company are among the company's most important retailers. Carhartt itself operates retail stores in the U.S. Uniquely, it celebrates the opening of its stores with a sledgehammer smashing a wall instead of a traditional ribbon-cutting ceremony. The company operates a "flagship" store in downtown Detroit in the old Cass Motor Sales building.

Carhartt keeps most of its advertising work in-house, a rare arrangement for a firm its size. Its ads feature actual consumers on actual work sites. In the past Carhartt focused on advertisements in magazines such as Popular Mechanics and American Cowboy with slogans like "As Rugged As The Men Who Wear Them." More recently the company has updated its style and has even partnered with actor Jason Momoa to make ads on things like surfing, hunting as a family tradition, and women making donuts while wearing suspenders.

== In popular culture ==
In 1990, Tommy Boy Records used Carhartt jackets as a promotional vehicle and had its logo embroidered on them. Tommy Boy initially gave away 800 such jackets to "tastemakers and people seen in all the right places." This effort was so successful that the record label eventually started expanding into clothing. Carhartt has gained popularity within the hip-hop community, with notable rappers such as Tupac and Dr. Dre wearing the brand. Carhartt jackets and their evolution as fashion items were featured prominently at the Bronx Museum of the Arts exhibition entitled "One Planet Under a Groove: Hip-Hop and Contemporary Art" in 2002.

Carhartt has become a part of the local culture in Alaska. Talkeetna has held an annual "Carhartt Ball" since 1996. The Alaska State Fair hosts a Carhartt fashion show. Carhartt capitalized on the growth of the working class in Alaska in the late 20th century due to the growth of the oil industry by having its local sales representative, Doug Tweedie, carefully cultivate relationships with the independent stores that dominate the state's relatively isolated retail market. Per-capita sales of the brand's products are higher in Alaska than anywhere else in the world.

The main characters of Interstellar wear Carhartt jackets. Carhartt products were on screen for about one hour. Matthew McConaughey wore the Duck Detroit Jacket #J001. Jessica Chastain wore the Weathered Duck Quinwood Chore Coat.

Liam Neeson wore a Carhartt jacket in Before and After.

The titular character in the Netflix series Marvel's Luke Cage is often seen wearing Carhartt apparel throughout the series. His signature "bulletridden hoodie" is a customized version of the Carhartt Rain Defender Rutland hooded sweatshirt.

Carhartt is popular with politicians trying to connect with blue-collar voters. John Fetterman, Sarah Palin, Rick Perry, and Barack Obama have all been seen prominently wearing Carhartt clothing.

The television series Yellowstone prominently features Carhartt clothing.

== Sponsorships and philanthropy ==
Carhartt supports various labor and community initiatives, including the National FFA Organization and work training programs like Helmets to Hardhats. The company has contributed to disaster relief efforts, including the donation of workwear to rescue crews during the 9/11 attacks. In 2020, Carhartt shifted some of its U.S. production to manufacturing protective masks and medical gowns in response to the COVID-19 pandemic.
