= Flete (disambiguation) =

Flete is a village in Kent.

Flete may also refer to:

== People ==
- John Flete (c. 1398–1466), English monk and ecclesiastical historian
- William Flete, 14th-century Augustinian hermit friar
- William Flete (MP) for Hertfordshire (UK Parliament constituency)

== Places ==
- Flete House, Devon

== See also ==
- Fleet (disambiguation)
