= List of killings by law enforcement officers in the United States, May 2026 =

This is a list of people reported killed by non-military law enforcement officers in the United States in May 2026, whether in the line of duty or not, and regardless of reason or method. The listing documents the occurrence of a death, making no implications regarding wrongdoing or justification on the part of the person killed or officer involved. Killings are arranged by date of the incident that caused death. Different death dates, if known, are noted in the description. The table below lists 106 people.

== May 2026 ==
Date	Name (age) of deceased	Race	Location	Description
2026-05-31	Christian Wallace (38)	Black	Oak Park, Illinois	An Oak Park deputy pulled over a black unidentified SUV driven by a man for a moving violation. The officer performed a pat-down after asking the driver to get out of the vehicle who found a concealed gun. The driver swiped the weapon after a struggle for control of it. The officer fatally shot him. The footage had been released by the city.
2026-05-30	Martin Nitzken Jr. (27)	White	Louisville, Kentucky	LMPD officers responded to an assault in the Klondike neighborhood. While responding, officers were informed that Nitzken was running through the streets naked. Officers found him sitting on the street. He refused to follow officers' commands to show his hands. Instead, he stood up and began to approach towards the officers. One officer told Nitzken to stop, before shooting him. Police said the officer waited three minutes after shooting Nitzken to render aid. The officer who shot Nitzken, Officer Nathan A. Stotts, was indicted by grand jury on a charge of reckless homicide. LMPD also fired Scotts posterior the homicide of Nitzken. The footage was released by LMPD.
2026-05-30	Kevin Jay Lamar Huguley Jr. (36)	Unknown	San Bernardino, California	Officers responded to a report of a sexual assault involving a minor at the New Zion Manor apartments. As officers attempted to detain Huguley, officers got into a struggle with him, but he managed to break free and grab a large kitchen knife before charging towards them while wielding the knife. Officers struggled with Huguley in an attempt to prevent him from stabbing law enforcement. While one officer fell backwards, Huguley continued to advance at officers before the officer opened fire on Huguley, killing him.
2026-05-30	Robert Salas (35)	Unknown	Albuquerque, New Mexico	Police confronted Salas after he was reported for trespassing, and he fled behind a pillar outside a Walgreens pharmacy. Two officers shot Salas after he allegedly charged at them. Only news segments from the bodycam was released by APD.
2026-05-30	Eddie Deans Jr. (46)	Black	Grand Rapids, Michigan	Police were called to a home for a report of a man threatening relatives with a knife. When officers arrived, the man threw a Molotov cocktail at a cruiser, setting it on fire. After a confrontation, in which the man reportedly pulled out a second Molotov, the man fled on foot. A police dog was sent in, and the man stabbed it several times. After attempting to break into a home, the man allegedly charged at officers with the knife, and officers shot him.
2026-05-29	unidentified male	Unknown	Veguita, New Mexico	New Mexico State Police responded to a report of a man armed with a gun in his property. Officers saw the man and told him to walk toward them with his hands up and empty, but the man refused and went back toward his house. Officers petitioned for search and arrest warrants before calling the New Mexico State Police Tactical Team and Crisis Negotiations Team to respond. They made multiple attempts to get the man to surrender safely. The man later walked toward NMSP officers while armed with a gun. Officers ordered him to drop the gun and then fired their weapons, striking him.
2026-05-29	Kenneth Ardagna (57)	Unknown	Flathead County, Montana	Officers fatally shot a Kalispell man who was armed with a gun during an assault response at a campground in the Emery Bay area of the Hungry Horse Reservoir.
2026-05-29	James Bolter III (38)	Unknown	Papillion, Nebraska	Police shot Bolter in the parking lot of a Home Depot after he allegedly fired at them.
2026-05-28	Christian Blanco Rodriguez (35)	Unknown	Grandfield, Oklahoma	Tillman County deputies received a notification about a man's gun being stolen by Rodriguez and drove away with the gun in a black unidentified pickup truck. Meanwhile, Grandfield officers were able to locate Rodriguez within the town and attempted to initiate a traffic stop, which turned into a short pursuit after Rodriguez failed to pull over. He stopped the vehicle in the middle of a roadway and pulled out a weapon in a standoff before being fatally shot by Grandfield police.
2026-05-28	Abdulhafedh Abdulhafedh (25)	Middle Eastern	Chicago, Illinois	An FBI "agent-involved shooting" left a robbery suspect (former leader of '100K Gang') dead while sitting in his unidentified SUV at Homan Square near Garfield Park. Three other people are also in the vehicle. Authorities confirmed that CPD officers were executing a search warrant to the suspect, who was tied to a bank robbery, and had been released from prison less than six months earlier after serving time for a robbery in Will County.
2026-05-28	Christie Lynn Adkins (43)	White	Vance, Alabama	Deputies arrived at a home to serve a warrant on a man, and Adkins, his sister, answered the door of a tent behind the home. Adkins's brother allegedly pointed a BB gun at deputies, and they opened fire, hitting him and Christie.
2026-05-27	David William Potts (53)	White	Indianapolis, Indiana	An ISP trooper stopped a wanted man on his bicycle before he resisted, leading to a foot chase. The trooper chased the man and tased him. The man, Potts, fell, became unresponsive, and was transported to a local hospital. He succumbed to his injuries a few days later.
2026-05-27	Cortez Eatmon (25)	Black	Kennesaw, Georgia	Officers respond to Town Center Mall for a report of shoplifting. Eatmon, an Alabama native, took off on foot from the mall's parking lot after arrival. An officer tried to tase Eatmon multiple times but was unsuccessful. During the pursuit, Eatmon pulled out a firearm leading the officer to fire his gun, killing him.
2026-05-27	unidentified	Unknown	Norman, Oklahoma	A vehicle pursuit on Interstate 35 that started in the neighboring town of Moore ended in officers executing a PIT maneuver on the car, before shooting and killing the driver.
2026-05-26	Jose Armas (23)	Hispanic	Albuquerque, New Mexico	Officers responded to a report of a man with suicidal thoughts, with the 911 call delivered by a family member in the Wells Park neighborhood. After arrival, officers heard someone yelling from a group of people, including the man. After getting the family out of the home, the man stayed inside. Police tried getting him to come out, saying they wanted to help him. When he exited the home, they used “less lethal” force, but he went back inside when it didn’t work. The man fired a gunshot from inside the home, hitting an officer’s vehicle and injuring two officers after shattered glass fell on them. The man came back outside with the gun, causing a shootout, before being fatally shot by police.
2026-05-26	Matthew Garrett (31)	White	Roland, Arkansas	Pulaski County deputies respond to a medical emergency involving a man with a large laceration on his head near Pinnacle Mountain State Park. As they began to treat the man, they noticed another man, later identified as Judsonia native Matthew Garrett, nearby wielding a large machete. After a request for backup, three Arkansas State Park Rangers responded to the scene. After arrival, Garrett advanced towards the rangers with his machete. The rangers then fired at Garrett, killing him. The man with the laceration was taken to a nearby hospital with non-life threatening injuries.
2026-05-26	Jonathan Simmons (38)	Unknown	Wilkinsburg, Pennsylvania	A Wilkinsburg officer was patrolling through a neighborhood during the evening hours when he encountered a man armed with a gun who was approaching the officer's unmarked Ford Explorer. The officer exited his vehicle, ordered him to drop the weapon several times, but refused. The officer fatally shot him in the chest.
2026-05-26	Aaron Barnes (34)	Unknown	Hammond, Indiana	Just after midnight, an Indiana State Police K-9 trooper pulled over a gray 2019 Hyundai Elantra on Interstate 80/94 near mile marker 2 and the Illinois border driven by a 34-year-old Gary man. During the traffic stop, the man took out a handgun and fired at the trooper, wounding him, before the officer fired back, shooting him in the chest, killing him. A female passenger, also 34, was immediately taken into custody afterward.
2026-05-25	Rajon Gunter (42)	Unknown	Norfolk, Virginia	During a traffic stop, a NPD officer found the driver had misdemeanor warrants out of Virginia Beach (for stalking and violating a protective order), and ordered the driver to get out of his white 2014 Nissan Rogue. The driver fled and dragged the officer with the vehicle before pulling into the Wedgewood Plaza Shopping Center. The officer fired one shot, killing the suspect, in defense near the Big Lots.
2026-05-25	Berkleigh Jade Bond (39)	White	Benson, Arizona	A woman was fatally shot by law enforcement for unknown reasons during a traffic stop on Interstate 10.
2026-05-25	Brian Branagin (51)	White	Danville, Indiana	Hendricks deputies responded to a report of a domestic disturbance at a residence. They attempted to contact the people inside the home before a man came out of the home and went back inside afterward. When the deputies tried to contact the man again, police said he came back outside, showed a rifle, then continued to go back in and out of the house. Deputies sent officers from Avon, Brownsburg, Danville and Plainfield to the scene. The man came back outside the house and pointed the rifle toward the officers, before being fatally shot by officers. Officers began searching the area for the woman who was reportedly involved in the initial report and found her in a grassy area in the back of the property with an undisclosed type of trauma. Medics arrived but the individual was also dead on-scene.
2026-05-24	Matthew Metzger (36)	Unknown	Steubenville, Ohio	Metzger was senn pointing rifles at passing vehicles and placing firearms inside his truck at a dealership property. Officers arrived and ordered him to drop the weapons. He ran toward the dealership while shooting at officers instead. He was killed in the shootout. The footage was released.
2026-05-24	unidentified male	Unknown	Ralls, Texas	A pursuit that started in neighboring Floyd County ended with an exchange of gunfire with the suspect in Crosby County. During the pursuit, the suspect dropped off a passenger on the side of the highway before crossing into Crosby. The pursuit ended between both Ralls and Cone, when he got out of the vehicle with a firearm and opened fire, before officers killed him.
2026-05-23	Qiam K. Ahmadi (36)	Unknown	Wichita, Kansas	Wichita officers received multiple reports of a man pointing a gun at workers and vehicles, causing several disturbances at businesses, including a Topgolf and a Bass Pro Shops. Officers located the man in the Wilson Estates neighborhood, where a large police response, including SWAT, drones and helicopters set up a perimeter. The man pointed a gun at officers who were on the platform of an armored vehicle. One Wichita officer fatally shot the suspect.
2026-05-23	unidentified male	Unknown	Nashville, Wisconsin	Crandon Police and DNR conservation wardens responded to reports of an active shooter on the tribal lands of the Sokaogon Chippewa Community. As they arrived, the suspect fired at them. They subsequently shot and killed him.
2026-05-23	Gordon Killbear Jr. (46)	Native American	Utqiagvik, Alaska	North Slope Borough Police fatally shot a person for reasons unknown.
2026-05-23	Nesire Best (21)	Black	Washington, District of Columbia	The United States Secret Service fatally shot Best, a resident from Dundalk, Maryland, after he approached a White House checkpoint gate armed with a gun and opened fire on officers. A bystander was also injured in the gunfire.
2026-05-22	Sgt. Joseph Apodaca (36)	Hispanic	Taos County, New Mexico	Police Sergeant Joseph Apodaca, a motorcycle deputy, and other Taos County deputies were pursuing a reckless driver. Apodaca was struck and killed by a sheriff's office pickup truck between Ranchos de Taos and Talpa during the pursuit when he tried to turn into a driveway. The initial suspect is still at large.
2026-05-22	unidentified male	Unknown	Idaho County, Idaho	A woman reported to police that a man threatened to shoot her with a gun. When Idaho County deputies encountered the suspect, for reasons unknown, they fatally shot him.
2026-05-22	unidentified male	Unknown	Sumter County, Florida	Sumter County deputies responded to a home for a man under mental distress. Upon arrival, the man barricaded himself inside a bedroom. Deputies eventually broke the door down before the man charged at them with a knife. SWAT officers then fatally shot him.
2026-05-22	Thomas Nelson (33)	White	Salt Lake City, Utah	SLC officers responded to reports of a suicidal male who brandished a weapon to a neighbor. During the encounter, Nelson pulled a gun on officers before they shot him The footage was released.
2026-05-21	Jonah Neal (25)	Black	Memphis, Tennessee	Memphis Safe Task Force members responded to a report of a man armed with a gun and threatening to kill himself at the Blue Ridge Park neighborhood after stabbing himself multiple times with a knife. Officers encountered the bloodied man with multiple weapons inside the residence. A female Homeland Security Investigations officer fatally shot him.
2026-05-21	Kaleb Hassel (28)	White	Spokane, Washington	Officers responded to an early morning domestic violence call involving a man, his wife and two young children in the Logan neighborhood. The caller told police that the man had been drinking, arguing with his wife, and making suicidal statements. After arrival, a very dangerous struggle ensued involving a weapon, with one officer using his firearm for protection. They contacted the woman through a second-story window. She told them her husband was downstairs, leaving her unable to exit the home. Moments later, the man's wife began screaming and crying and was heard yelling "no, no, no" and "please don’t". Officers entered the home and spotted the pair fighting each other and the man armed with a gun. Officers intervened and had a brief struggle with the man before one of the officers shot him, killing him.
2026-05-20	Brenda Deer (45)	White	Oklahoma City, Oklahoma	OCPD officers responded to an apartment complex regarding a woman firing a gun. Upon arrival, the woman barricaded herself inside an apartment and fired at officers, leading one officer to return fire, killing her. The footage had been released.
2026-05-20	Michael Pinon (38)	Hispanic	Tulare, California	Tulare County deputies responded to reports of a possible fight at a home in the south part of Tulare. After arriving, they were confronted by a man who refused to come out and later appeared from the back of the home. Officers fatally shot the man after he pointed a weapon at them.
2026-05-19	Akili Hammond (26)	Black	Cleveland, Ohio	A verbal altercation between an off-duty Cleveland officer and a man escalated into a shooting in the Glenville neighborhood. The officer fatally shot the man afterward, and a gun belonging to the man was recovered at the scene.
2026-05-19	Emil McCord (33)	Unknown	Anchorage, Alaska	Officers received a call about a man firing rounds in the air from a handgun in East Anchorage. They spotted the man sitting on the ground. He ignored multiple commands, got up, and walked toward the middle of the road armed with a weapon. Three officers fatally shot him afterward. The footage was released and the shooting had been justified by the Office of Special Prosecutions
2026-05-19	unidentified male	Unknown	St. Louis, Missouri	The SLMPD received a call involving a man swinging a pipe near the intersection of Locust and Broadway in downtown St. Louis. A bicycle officer located the man at Broadway and Olive, and the man threw a cup of coffee at the officer before running away. Officers immediately followed the man to Broadway and Lucas. The man ignored officers’ commands to drop the metal pole, and officers tased him to no avail. Law enforcement officers continued to command the man to drop the pole before he ran toward an officer and raised the pipe. An officer fired at the man, who turned and tried to hide behind a car. The man continued to ignore commands and suddenly pulled a butcher knife before lunging toward officers. An officer opened fire a second time at the man, fatally shooting him.
2026-05-18	Erik John Anderson (47)	Unknown	Fort Wayne, Indiana	FWPD responded to a residence located northwest of downtown for a man under mental health crisis. Despite de-escalation efforts and multiple contacts, the man opened the door and pushed a long gun toward them. Officers fired and killed him.
2026-05-18	Randy Martin (47)	Black	Galveston, Texas	A Galveston officer pulled over an unidentified vehicle which left a narcotics surveillance. When the officer attempted to search and handcuff Martin, Martin resisted arrest. Footage shows that Martin did reach toward the officer's firearm. Reports shows Martin was unarmed during the incident and no guns were found in the vehicle. The dashcam footage was released and A Galveston County grand jury declined to indict the officer.
2026-05-18	Hector Amaya (38)	Black	Alexandria, Virginia	APD responded to a shots fired call where a woman was shot. The suspect barricaded himself inside an apartment room, at some point, he charged at officers at full speed before two fired at him. Both the suspect and the woman died in the incident. The footage had been released in a press conference.
2026-05-17	James Heggie (36)	Unknown	Dickson, Tennessee	During a traffic stop, for reasons unknown, a struggle ensued between Hickman County deputies and Heggie. The deputies shot and killed him.
2026-05-17	Carlos Osegueda (48)	Unknown	High Point, North Carolina	Two juveniles ran out and reported a domestic violence incident at a home. High Point officers arrived and found a man covered with blood armed with a knife at the home. The man, Osegueda, ignored commands and approached the officers before being shot dead. His wife was found stabbed to death.
2026-05-17	Joshua Keller (27)	White	Fort Smith, Arkansas	A local man opened fire on Fort Smith Police following a pursuit involving a 2003 Chevrolet Silverado 1500 Z71 on Interstate 540 on the mile marker 6 bridge, critically wounding an officer before other officers opened fire on the suspect, killing him. Authorities confirmed that the officer began a DWI investigation after making contact with Keller. During the encounter, Keller became argumentative and got back into his Silverado trying to flee. Keller shot the officer in the neck after pulling out a handgun while the officer attempted to detain him. The officer returned fire while wounded and Keller got away. The officer survived his injuries. The footage was released.
2026-05-16	Emmitt Elijah Mayo (25)	Black	Fort Worth, Texas	Fort Worth police respond to a report of multiple shots being fired in East Fort Worth. After arrival, they found a party that was going on in the area and officers heard more shots being fired. As officers were moving into the area where the shots were being fired, they encountered a man armed with an illegally modified Glock 17. The man pointed the Glock at officers while refusing to follow directions or asking orders to drop his gun. The man fired one shot, before one officer fatally shot him. Police later identified the shooter as a local rapper under the stage name 88dub. Four hours later, while Fort Worth police continued to investigate the shooting, a man driving in a white second-generation pre-facelift Chevrolet Traverse drove by officers at a high rate of speed multiple times, appearing that the driver was attempting to hit officers standing near their vehicles. Officers attempted to pull him over, which failed, leading to a 15-minute-pursuit. The pursuit ended with a PIT maneuver at Interstate 820 near mile marker 30B just as it reached the Lancaster Avenue overpass between the borders of Fort Worth and Arlington. As officers approached the Traverse with their guns drawn and giving commands, the other man did not comply and grabbed an officer's handgun as the officer was pointing the service weapon at him. Multiple officers fatally shot him. Body Cam footage in both incidents was released.
2026-05-16	Jorge Contreras (29)	Hispanic	Fort Worth, Texas	
2026-05-16	unidentified male	Unknown	Freehold Township, Pennsylvania	Pennsylvania State Police troopers attempted to serve a felony warrant on a man at a home. They shot the man when he pointed a rifle at them.
2026-05-16	Miguel Angel Gallegos (49)	Unknown	Parkersburg, West Virginia	A local man was killed by police during an exchange of gunfire with Parkersburg officers and Wood County deputies. Another body was found at the scene but was not related to the killing of the suspect.
2026-05-16	unidentified male	Unknown	Houston, Texas	A man was seen armed with a knife and tried to board a bus near Houston Botanic Garden. METRO police arrived and confronted the man. The man charged at the officers before being shot in the leg. He was pronounced dead at a hospital.
2026-05-15	unidentified male	Unknown	Ozark, Arkansas	A suspect reportedly stabbed and killed a married couple inside their house before Franklin County deputies arrived. The suspect subsequently barricaded himself on the second floor of the house, resulting an hours-long standoff. During which, deputies deployed tear gas into the home, forcing the suspect to leave. The suspect fought with deputies and tried to grab a deputy’s gun. Deputies then shot him.
2026-05-15	Rodney Wied (61)	Unknown	Owens Cross Roads, Alabama	Madison County Coroner's Office confirmed that a person is dead after being shot during an interaction with police during a call on Highway 231/431 South. The shooting also caused the suspect's vehicle to crash into a pond. Only a small amount of details were released.
2026-05-14	unidentified male (60)	Unknown	Waterford Township, Michigan	A Madison Heights man was fatally shot by Waterford Township officers following a pursuit involving a fourth-generation Kia Rio hatchback. Waterford police responded by request for assistance from Michigan State Police, who had pursued the suspect into Waterford. After turning into a neighborhood, he crashed his Rio into a tree. They ordered the man to show his hands, but he failed to comply and allegedly raised a handgun. Between five-to-ten gunshots were fired at the suspect, killing him.
2026-05-14	John K. Rushlander (37)	Unknown	Hydetown, Pennsylvania	Pennsylvania State Police deputies fatally shot a man after pulling out a handgun and opened fire on deputies while serving a warrant.
2026-05-14	unidentified male (37)	Unknown	Ecorse, Michigan	Ecorse deputies respond to a domestic assault. When officers arrived, they found a woman with apparent cut wounds and actively bleeding. While police were gathering information and assessing the situation, the suspect, a 37-year-old man, returned to the scene with a box cutter. The man refused to drop the box cutter, leading to one officer deploying a taser. The man fell to the ground, but quickly got back up and allegedly charged toward an officer while holding the box cutter. Officers fatally shot him afterward.
2026-05-14	Jesse Fitzgerald (27)	Unknown	Kansas City, Kansas	KCKSPD officers respond to a report of a domestic disturbance at the Concord Square Apartments in Victory Hills. After escalating the scene, police respond to the apartments again. While attempting to contact the caller, officers encountered the suspect and a single shot was fired. A brief physical struggle ensued, and one officer fired a shot, killing him. A metal spoon was found at the scene.
2026-05-14	Michael Hristov (21)	White	Louisville, Kentucky	LMPD's SWAT team arrived at the Wyandotte neighborhood to serve a warrant for Michael Hristov, a man wanted on the brutal murder of another man named Michael Howard on December 24, 2025. According to the report, LMPD discovered Howard deceased on railroad tracks by the fairgrounds near Interstate 65, shot, stabbed and dismembered. Police discovered him naked, with Howard's penis and eight of his toes were cut off by Hristov. Symbols were carved into his body. The warrant also confirmed that Hristov was also a suspect of a stabbing of another man on Christmas Day after Howard's murder. At the scene, SWAT members called for Hristov to exit the home. He refused and then began shooting at officers from inside the building. Hristov called MetroSafe on the phone and stated that he was armed and wanted the officers outside to shoot and kill him. Members of the SWAT team continued to attempt to resolve the incident through peaceful methods, including the use of chemical agents, but Hristov continued to fire from inside the house. After 20 minutes, Hristov exited the home wearing a helmet and a ballistic vest. Officers asked Hristov to drop his weapon, but he did not comply. One officer then fatally shot Hristov, killing him on scene. The footage was released.
2026-05-14	Louis Jackson (46)	Unknown	Baltimore, Maryland	Baltimore Police respond to a report of a suicidal man near Saint Agnes Hospital in the Carroll neighborhood. Officers found the man, armed with a weapon, before arriving on scene, who immediately fired at officers' vehicles. One officer stopped their vehicle and engaged with the man in an attempt to de-escalate the situation. The man ignored the officer's commands to drop the weapon and get on the ground. He ignored the commands communicated to him and continued to fire at officers, before two officers fatally shot him. The footage was released.
2026-05-14	unidentified male	Unknown	Emporia, Virginia	Greensville County deputies respond to an early morning domestic incident, but the suspect left the scene before officers arrived. He returned to the scene after deputies arrived, pulled out a handgun and shot at deputies, wounding one, before other officers exchanged gunfire while the man attempted to barricade inside the house. He was found dead from inside the house.
2026-05-14	Tayshawn Redford (19)	Black	Pueblo, Colorado	Shortly after midnight, Pueblo officers responded to Drew Dix Park after a fight with weapons were reported there. The people involved in the fight had left the area when police arrived, but officers were able to locate the suspect’s van nearby with three suspects in. During the encounter with police, one of the suspects brandished a handgun, before one officer fatally shot him.
2026-05-12	Nicolas Keith (34)	White	Lucerne Valley, California	San Bernardino County deputies responded to a strong-arm robbery. Upon arrival, they located the suspect inside his vehicle. While trying to detain him, Keith reversed his car and striking a deputy. Two opened fire, killing him.
2026-05-12	Cordney Sherod Stewart (38)	White	Searcy, Arkansas	SPD Police responded to a report of a Jacksonville man firing a gun at a Valero gas station. An officer fatally shot the suspect during the encounter.
2026-05-12	Mitchell D. Folsom (51)	White	Tulsa, Oklahoma	Folsom had an altercation with the driver inside a vehicle and shot the driver before the vehicle swerved off the road and crashed near Flat Rock Creek. At some point after TPD located him in a pond, he posed a threat, prompting officers to shoot. His body was later recovered underwater.
2026-05-12	Joe Baythavong (33)	Asian	Athens, Georgia	Officers responded to a report of a Hoschton, Georgia man with a gun who fired one shot at his residence. After arriving, officers encountered a man who was holding a firearm. One officer opened fire on the man, killing him.
2026-05-11	Paul Desmarais (41)	Unknown	Bucyrus, Ohio	During a nearly 15-hour standoff, the suspect, Desmarais, reportedly fired shots at Bucyrus officers before they deployed tear gas into parts of the home in an attempt to force him out. He also reportedly threatened officers with explosives. Ultimately, officers opened fire and killed him.
2026-05-11	Mary Alice Love (37)	Black	Mundelein, Illinois	MPD Officers fatally shot a suicidal individual during a report of a suicide-in-progress. Love was shot thrice when she approached officers with a knife when officers were trying to evacuate her mother. The footage was released.
2026-05-11	Gray McNeil Vinson (33)	White	Greenville, Alabama	Officers responded to a report of shots fired during the evening hours before confronting the suspect after arrival. Officers saw a handgun in the man’s possession and demanded he drop it. Instead, he raised it, and officers fatally shot him.
2026-05-11	Brandon Michael Sears (44)	White	Salina, Kansas	Officers pulled over a 1951 Chevrolet Loadmaster farm truck before Sears got out of his truck armed with a gun. He went back inside and a pursuit started. During a pursuit, an officer deployed stop sticks at two locations to attempt to stop the truck. At the second location, the man allegedly drove toward a Saline County deputy. After the pursuit ended at Pacific Park, the man wearing a body armor opened fire on officers before officers fatally shot him.
2026-05-10	Damian Camacho (3)	Hispanic	Princeton, Illinois	A suspect barricaded himself along with several hostages inside a room. After attempts to get the suspect out failed, screams were heard by ISP troopers. Troopers fired shots that struck both a hostage, Camacho and the suspect. Camacho died of his injuries.
2026-05-10	Steven Eastwood (28)	White	Riverhead, New York	Southampton officers fatally shot a man while responding to a report of the man stabbing his elderly mother on her wheelchair 40 times during an escalating domestic violence situation at a residence. Authorities confirmed that the man had a history of mental health issues and domestic abuse, and three Southampton officers were taken to a nearby hospital for treatment. The footage had been released.
2026-05-10	Cody A. Johnson (32)	Black	Columbia, South Carolina	A Forest Acres officer fatally shot a Lexington man after officers heard gunshots and witnessed a car driving erratically afterward. The vehicle entered the parking lot leading to Relapse Bar and Grill before the car moved toward the back of the property, where multiple cars, a security guard, and people were. The suspect refused commands as he continued to drive before the officer fatally shot him from inside his car. The Richland County Sheriff's Office attempted to help the situation, but the man was already dead by arrival.
2026-05-09	Brandon Joseph Brabin (29)	White	DeLand, Florida	DeLand Police attempted a stop on a reckless driver who nearly struck a pedestrian. The driver fled, which initiated a pursuit. Volusia County deputies later found the vehicle at a parking lot and approached it. The driver then accelerated the vehicle and tried to flee again. A deputy fired one shot through the windshield, killing the driver. The vehicle continued a short distance through the parking lot before crashing.
2026-05-09	James Patrick Willis (51)	Unknown	Muncie, Indiana	MPD responded to a call about a man who attempted to force himself into a residence. He later tried to flee and drove directly toward an MPD officer. The officer opened fire and killed him.
2026-05-08	Cortez White (41)	Black	Peoria, Illinois	Police responded to a domestic dispute. Upon first officer's arrival, the suspect shot and killed his ex-girlfriend in front of the officer. The officer chased down and shot at the suspect multiple times, killing him. The footage was released and the officer's actions were ruled justified by prosecutors.
2026-05-08	unidentified female	Unknown	Norman, Oklahoma	A Cleveland County deputy who was responding to an unrelated call was involved in a collision with another vehicle. The driver of the other vehicle died.
2026-05-08	Shawn Valn (33)	Black	Arlington, Virginia	Arlington County police officers responded to a call regarding a disorderly person. Responding officers encountered Valn outside the convenience store when he pulled out a knife, ignored commands, and entered the business. A barricade situation subsequently ensued. When they entered the store to arrest him on outstanding warrants, he showed a knife when officers shot him. The footage had been released.
2026-05-08	unidentified male	Unknown	Oshkosh, Wisconsin	Police were called to reports of a man with a handgun in a parking lot leading to a Fleet Farm. After officers encountered the man, one shot him when he allegedly grabbed a gun from his waist. The officer who fatally shot him was placed on administrative leave.
2026-05-08	Jaquan Marion (26)	Black	Omaha, Nebraska	During the afternoon hours, Douglas County deputies and SWAT team attempted to serve arrest warrants on a wanted felon at a residence in the Brown Park neighborhood. A shootout broke out. The fugitive was killed and a deputy was shot and injured. Still images showing what led to the shooting were released by the sheriff's office.
2026-05-07	Alexavier Nalani Nahoolewa (19)	White	Saginaw, Texas	One Saginaw officer fatally shot Nahoolewa after a resisting arrest turned into a “physical confrontation” with other officers while serving a warrant.
2026-05-07	Thomas Kenneth Bowen III (37)	White	Nahunta, Georgia	Brantley County deputies came to a home to arrest Bowen on outstanding warrants. Bowen got into a truck and fled scene. At some point during the pursuit, Bowen stopped the truck to release the trailer. Deputies gave several commands and tried to tase him. He resisted and pointed a gun at them. Deputies opened fire in response.
2026-05-07	unidentified male	Unknown	San Leandro, California	San Leandro officers responded to conduct an evening welfare check on a suicidal man. Police later found him sitting inside a vehicle near the boat launch at the San Leandro Marina. After speaking with the officers for a short time, he pointed a gun at them, leading officers to shoot.
2026-05-07	Jazmin Wooten-Mitchell (31)	Black	Richmond, Virginia	RPD officers responded to a shooting in progress at an apartment. During which, they encountered a woman firing a gun at an apartment complex hall. An officer then fatally shot her. The footage was released.
2026-05-06	Elia Zereth Hernandez (46)	Hispanic	San Antonio, Texas	A Southwest ISD officer killed his wife and himself in a murder-suicide on a highway.
2026-05-06	Hernan Marrero (50)	Hispanic	Lynnfield, Massachusetts	Massachusetts State Police trooper Kevin Trainor, who just ended his shift, responded to a report of a wrong-way DUI driver, Marrero, on Route 1 north in Lynnfield and tried to stop the car. The car later collided head-on with Trainor's unmarked cruiser, killing both Trainor and the driver.
2026-05-06	Stephen Kwembe (28)	Black	Richardson, Texas	Richardson police responded to several calls reporting a man threatening patrons with a knife at Good Vibes Bar and Grill. The threat turned into a mass stabbing, injuring four people (including three men) inside the restaurant. After being told there were victims inside, officers ordered Kwembe to drop the weapon. Kwembe refused to comply and advanced towards the officers, at which point two officers opened fire, killing him. A third officer deployed a bean bag round to separate Kwembe from the knife.
2026-05-06	Michael Bradley Davis (49)	White	Red Oak, Texas	Ellis County deputies respond to a report of a man screaming, threatening to harm deputies and commit suicide, and armed with a gun. When deputies arrived on the scene, one of the deputies found the armed suspect, and gave him multiple commands to drop the weapon. The man pointed it at the deputy, resulting in the deputy firing his service weapon, killing him on-scene.
2026-05-06	Hannah Aberegg (25)	White	South Bend, Indiana	A mother called police, requesting a welfare check on her 25-year-old daughter who was having a mental episode. Officers located her at a Phillips 66 gas station. Two minutes later, the woman pulled out a weapon before officers opened fire on the subject.
2026-05-06	Steven Orth (81)	White	Edinburg, Texas	A homeowner called police after confronting irrigation workers conducting routine work. He became upset at the workers and demanded they leave the area, so officers respond to a report of a disturbance. The homeowner insisted on responding police officers that the workers leave and said “he would retrieve a firearm if his demands were not met”. The homeowner removed a pistol from his waistband and raised the firearm at the direction of officers, before being fatally shot by officers.
2026-05-06	Tony Duaine Artusi (46)	White	Edwardsburg, Michigan	Cass County deputies respond to an afternoon report of a local man who kicked in the front door while armed with a handgun. After arriving on scene, the victims ran out of the house before the man lit the house up on fire before fleeing from the house into the woods. Deputies set up a permitter around the area and requested help from other agencies, including the Michigan State Police who found the suspect walking on the railroad tracks. They attempted to contact the suspect in a field where an exchange of gunfire caused the suspect to become incapacitated. MSP troopers fatally shot him down.
2026-05-06	Ngirasiau Sikong (35)	Pacific Islander	Susanville, California	Susanville officers responded to parties expressing concern for the well-being of children after a man, under the influence of methamphetamine, was reported to be acting erratically near them. The man talked to the officers through the upstairs window, but became more agitated when the reporting parties engaged with him. After observing the man retrieve a machete and appear to hit a young child, officers began making entry into the house by breaking the glass and kicking the door. Subsequently, the man descended the stairs and swung the machete several times, one hitting a piece of glass and the other towards one officer. He was then fatally shot by one of the officers using a shotgun while attempting to walk out of the living room. Police had released the footage.
2026-05-05	Damian Barajas (30)	Hispanic	San Antonio, Texas	Officers and SWAT respond to serve felony warrants at the Mission Villas apartment complex in the city's south side for a 30-year-old man who had multiple felony warrants, including charges tied to violent offenses, property crimes, and a parole violation for assault involving choking. Officers tried to use a flashbang to take the man into custody. Two officers fatally shot the man after the man ran, pulled out a gun and fired at officers.
2026-05-05	Matthew Cruz (36)	Unknown	Fort Worth, Texas	At the Champions Circle Apartments near both Interstate 35W and the Texas Motor Speedway, a man was killed by an officer with the Texas Attorney General's Office for unknown reasons. Fort Worth and Northlake police officers both stated they were not involved in the shooting.
2026-05-04	unidentified	Hispanic	Union, Eau Claire County, Wisconsin	Eau Claire County Sheriff’s Deputies responded to a three-vehicle collision. One person involved fled and a deputy later located the person. The person reportedly brandished a knife before the deputy fired and killed the person.
2026-05-04	Moises Flores Andrade (25)	Unknown	Stockton, California	Officers responded to a series of events involving Andrade, who at the time of the 911 call was smashing through the front door of a home, but left the area before officers arrived. Officers contacted the suspect in the driveway near the garage door at another neighborhood. Andrade picked up an axe and refused repeated commands to drop it. He raised the axe toward officers before officers fatally shot him. Police had released the footage.
2026-05-04	Brandon Laron Kaphers (33)	Black	Jacksonville, Florida	Officers respond to a late-night shots fired call in the Holiday Hill neighborhood. A 911 report confirms that they thought that the man was shooting fireworks but was confirmed to be a man with a weapon opening fire at homes after looking out the window. The man attempted to break into four homes by kicking down their doors. officers found the man and shot him when he pointed a gun at them. The footage was released.
2026-05-04	Jovan Alejandro Huerta-Salinas	Unknown	Marfa, Texas	Presidio County deputies assisted in a morning pursuit that started as an armed burglary in Valentine before the suspect stole the vehicle. The pursuit began in Jeff Davis County, moved through Presidio County, and ended back in Jeff Davis County. During the pursuit, officials say the suspect fired several rounds at officers, before officers fired back, killing him.
2026-05-03	Xavier Crosson (25)	Unknown	Greensboro, North Carolina	A Greensboro Police cruiser crashed into another vehicle when the officer was trying to assist another officer. The driver died 13 days later. Officer Haley Maeurer, the involved officer, resigned and was charged with misdemeanor death by vehicle and speeding. Police confirmed she didn't have her lights and sirens on during the crash.
2026-05-03	Dylan Redbow (27)	Native American	Cannon Ball, North Dakota	A local man was fatally shot by law enforcement at his mother's Standing Rock Reservation home during the evening hours for unknown reasons.
2026-05-02	unidentified male	Unknown	Arvada, Colorado	Both Arvada and Westminster officers respond to a report of a disturbance between two men at the Willow Green Townhomes in the area of 70th Avenue and Sheridan Boulevard. Officers noticed evidence of a struggle and forced their way into the apartment out of concern for the safety of those inside. After safely removing two women and a child from out of the apartment in order to handle the two men inside. Westminster police deployed a drone, and officers saw a man crawling out of a top-floor window onto the building's roof while holding a gun before he went back inside. He returned to the roof and grabbed his gun but fell onto the roof. He returned to get his gun but a Westminster officer fatally shot him dead.
2026-05-02	Levi Ray (47)	Unknown	Kingman, Arizona	Mohave County deputies respond to the Love's Travel Stop near Interstate 40 after receiving reports of an erratic driver who had damaged a gas pump. When deputies arrived, they told the man he was under arrest. He immediately pulled out a gun, before officers did the exact thing, fatally shooting the suspect.
2026-05-02	Billy Joe Williams (48)	Unknown	Chattanooga, Tennessee	A Chattanooga officer responded to a disturbance, before spotting the suspect holding a gun out of the window and tried to tell him to come out of the apartment. An officer fired his gun at the window when he failed to comply, killing him.
2026-05-02	Israel Hernandez-Martinez (37)	Hispanic	Woodburn, Oregon	A Salem police officer respond to a report of an aggressive person near two white barns armed with multiple tire irons. A confrontation began and an officer fatally shot Hernandez-Martinez afterward.
2026-05-01	Ethan Roy Basche (31)	White	Virginia, Minnesota	Virginia Police responded to a report of a Chisholm, Minnesota man with severe mental illness pacing back and forth, wearing a ski mask and waving a torch lighter during the morning hours. The man ignored officers’ commands to drop the item and pointed it at officers before being fatally shot by officers. Police released the footage.
2026-05-01	unidentified male	Unknown	Martinsburg, West Virginia	Berkeley County officers arrived at a report of a man brandishing a firearm and threatening to “shoot up the Green Frog Bar”, in downtown Martinsburg. The man left the establishment and entered a vehicle in the parking lot before law enforcement arrived. The man refused commands from officers and presented a handgun and was killed by law enforcement.
2026-05-01	Anthony Montalvo (33)	Hispanic	Lawton, Oklahoma	Lawton officers respond to an assault report. When officers arrived, they made contact with Montalvo. Montalvo made verbal threats toward officers, who attempted to negotiate with him for several hours. While being armed with two weapons, officers fatally shot him while attempting to exit his residence.
2026-05-01	Zachary Pule (33)	White	Ottawa, Kansas	Pule was killed by Ottawa police during a multi-hour standoff during the evening hours. Authorities confirmed that Pule opened fire from a residence, injuring an Ottawa police officer before being gunned down by other officers.
2026-05-01	Saveion McConnell (19)	Black	Pittsville, Missouri	Officers respond to a shooting that wounded a 17-year-old boy. As they were responding to the scene, deputies learned that a suspect was fleeing the scene on foot. Mutual assistance from Lafayette County and Odessa established a perimeter. Deputies found two men walking at a nearby intersection and made contact. Officers gave chase when learning that one of the men, McConnell, had matched the suspect's description. A sheriff's deputy struck McConnell with a vehicle, then shot him as he fled on foot. No weapons were recovered from the scene. The footage was released by the defense lawyer. Johnson County, Missouri, Prosecuting Attorney's decided to not pursue criminal charges. The family members of McConnell strongly disagree with the decision.

== See also ==
- Death in custody § United States
- Henry A. Wallace Police Crime Public Database
- List of cases of police brutality
- List of countries with annual rates and counts for killings by law enforcement officers
- List of law enforcement officers killed in the line of duty in the United States
- List of law enforcement officers convicted for an on-duty killing in the United States
- List of shootings by US immigration agents
- List of police reforms related to the George Floyd protests
- List of unarmed African Americans killed by law enforcement officers in the United States
- Lists of killings by law enforcement officers
- Police brutality in the United States
- Police misconduct § United States
- Police riot § United States
- Police use of deadly force in the United States
