= Karnataka Garment Workers Union =

Trade union of garment workers in India

KOOGU
- Karnataka Garment Workers Union
- Founded: 2009
- Location: India
- Members: 3000
- Key people: Sebastian Devaraj, honorary president

The Karnataka Garment Workers Union (KOOGU) is a trade union of garment workers in India.

== History ==
KOOGU was founded in 2009, following the entrance of major international brands in the garment sector of South India. This made it possible for workers to form unions, which had until then been harshly restricted by local factory owners. KOOGU first only reacted to violations of labour rights, but later started working with international trade union federations for long-term improvements.

In July 2021, and in January 2022, KOOGU led talks with leading Indian garment producer Shahi Group regarding the economic consequences of the COVID-19 pandemic for workers. Several international brands were also invited, but either did not respond (Abercrombie & Fitch, Benetton, Columbia, Tommy Hilfiger, Vans) or declined to participate (Carhartt, Decathlon, H&M).
