= Michael Hristov =

American serial killer from Louisville, Kentucky

- Bodycam footage of Hristov during a June 2025 encounter.
- Born: Michael Hristov
- Died: May 14, 2026 1:46 p.m. EST; Louisville, Kentucky, United States.
- Cause of death: Suicide by cop
- Other names: Petamine u/DPHTripAlt
- Known for: murder of Michael Howard; posting about crimes on Reddit
- Parent: Tracy Hristov
- Motive: Thrill killing
- Criminal charges: Murder; Assault (first-degree); Abuse of a corpse

Details
- Victims: Taiwan Jenkins (murdered); unnamed woman (survived); Michael Howard (murdered); unnamed man (survived)
- Span of crimes: December 11, 2025 – December 25, 2025
- State: Kentucky
- Weapons: SIG Sauer P320; Knives
- 911 call Hristov's call to 911 during the shootout

Michael Hristov was an American serial killer from Louisville, Kentucky, who assaulted and murdered multiple homeless people during his lifetime. His "modus operandi" consisted of him riding around on a scooter wearing tactical gear armed with knives and a gun. Hristov would stake out areas populated by homeless people. Once he found a victim, he would lure them to a secluded area, assault, and murder them. He gained virality after posting about one of his murders on the Louisville subreddit. He died in a shootout with LMPD on May 14, 2026.

== Personal life ==
There is little known about Hristov outside of his attacks. He has been described as a recluse. He was 21 at the time of his death and was born to Tracy Hristov who he lived with at the time of his death. Hristov used Benadryl and enjoyed urban exploration, both of which he posted about on his Reddit account.

== Attacks and Reddit post ==
On December 11, 2025, 52-year-old Taiwan Jenkins was found unconscious and badly beaten on the side of I-65. She had multiple bruises and cuts on her head, and a deep cut on her arm. While she survived the initial attack, she never regained consciousness and died on January 18. While her case officially remains open, police consider her a likely victim of Hristov.

On December 13, 2025, a woman was pistol-whipped by a man close to the area where the December 11 murder occurred. She reported to the police that she knew the man, and that he was known to ride a scooter.

On December 21, 2025, an account named "Petamine" made a post on the Louisville subreddit titled, "Possible Serial Killer in Louisville?" The poster claimed he had a friend in the Louisville Metro Police Department who overheard two detectives talking about a man who killed homeless people and drew symbols on their bodies. At this time, there were no reports of homeless murder victims with symbols on their bodies, and the police had not yet considered the first two attacks were linked. The post and the account itself was later deleted.

On December 25, 2025, a man was stabbed in the neck by "a white male wearing a mask" under an I-65 overpass. He managed to escape and tried to flag down cars before taking refuge at a nearby Denny's.

At 10 a.m., on December 26, 2025, police were dispatched to a dead body found on the side of I-65. The police found the body of 46-year-old Michael Howard, a homeless man who frequented the area, lying near train tracks. Howard was found naked, wrapped in a blanket, with multiple stab wounds, and with symbols carved into him. His genitalia and eight of his toes had been cut off. Seven of his toes were recovered from the scene, but one was unable to be located. Police determined the body had been there since December 24.

== Tips and investigation ==
=== Pre-Michael Howard investigation ===
In January 2023, LMPD received a tip warning police that Hristov had threatened to shoot up his high school and that he posted videos of himself killing and mutilating cats.

In August 2023, LMPD received a tip reporting Hristov had a Discord account where he spoke about mass violence, hunting people, and different methods of killing people. Hristov was also known to have made threats against public officials.

In 2023, an LMPD detective interviewed Hristov after receiving the tips. In the interview, Hristov said "he hunts people every night and sometimes you never get the kill, you're just there for the fun of the hunt." Hristov also admitted to cutting a paw off a cat he killed and keeping the corpse in his room until it started to stink. Hristov also attributed his violent and illegal behavior to his time in juvenile detention. Hristov was involuntarily hospitalized after the interview.

On March 16, 2025, the FBI received a tip saying Hristov had filmed himself assaulting and raping homeless people, and playing with the corpses of dead animals.

=== Post-Michael Howard investigation ===
On December 31, 2025, LMPD interviewed the December 25 stabbing victim. He described the stabber as "a white male wearing a mask." He said the man asked him about Jeffrey Dahmer, and a man named Michael who he claimed raped a 4-year-old. Howard was on the sex-offender registry for a crime matching that description.

Police began taking interviews with the homeless population in that area. They described a man who was known to ride around on a scooter in tactical gear and harass the homeless in that area. The police looked through surveillance footage on the night of the December 25 stabbing and saw a man fitting that description fleeing the area where the stabbing occurred. The police also started looking through previous reports of a man fitting that description.

A man reported that on December 2, 2025, a "thin built white male, wearing all black" tried to lure him into the woods near I-264. He said that he thought the man was an officer because of how he was dressed. The man was also armed with a gun. Another person warned officers about a "white male wearing all black with a vest and a mask" who was known to assault homeless people. They also reported the man had tried to lure them into his house.

An officer remembered encountering someone matching that description in June 2025. The man approached two officers dispatched to a car crash and told them he had been held at gunpoint. He also told them he was equipped with three knives. The man identified himself as Michael Hristov and gave officers a home address. The police also had an encounter with Hristov on December 17, 2025, after he crashed his scooter.

On March 7, 2026, LMPD executed a search warrant on Hristov's home and devices. Police detained him as he was about to leave the home on his scooter. During a search of his home, police seized a backpack that had Howard's blood on it. In a search of Hristov's devices, the police found a picture of a severed toe on Hristov's iCloud account. Hristov's phone records placed him at the murder scene during the time of the murder. They also linked Hristov's IP address to the Petamine Reddit account. At a later press conference, Deputy Chief Emily McKinney also said they found white supremacist content, although these were not disclosed in the warrant.

== Standoff and death ==
On May 13, 2026, a grand jury indicted Hristov on murder, first-degree assault, and abuse of a corpse. The police waited until Hristov's mother left the home to execute the warrant. At 1 p.m. on May 14, after his mom left the home, police surrounded Hristov's house and demanded him to surrender. Hristov refused and began shooting at officers through the wall. Police sent two drones into the property, both of which Hristov shot down. During the shootout, Hristov called 911 saying he was not going to surrender or shoot any of the SWAT officers, and that he was going to die. Hristov said he had a SIG Sauer P320 and had over 150 rounds of ammunition. After police sprayed tear gas into the house, Hristov stepped onto the porch wearing his tactical vest, with his gun aimed at his head. Police again demanded he surrender. When Hristov did not respond, Officer Beau Gadegaard fired a shot, killing him instantly. The SWAT team shot less lethal rounds at him to make sure he was dead. Once they confirmed he was dead they made their way into the house. The shootout lasted around 25 minutes.

== Aftermath and community response ==
LMPD gave an initial response shortly after the shootout. Chief Deputy Emily McKinney explained they were serving an indictment for a "white male in his 20s" on murder, assault, and abuse of a corpse.

After the shootout, Hristov's Reddit post went viral and was covered by various online horror creators.

During the shootout, Hristov shot many pieces of property close by, including houses and vehicles. A nearby elementary school entered lockdown during the shootout. Hristov's mother, Tracy, gave an interview with WHAS11 in which she denies her son committed any crimes, and said she plans to continue living in the home.

Homeless advocates in the area warned about the dangers present to the homeless community. Jeff Gill, owner of a homelessness outreach organization, said that he knew Howard. Gill said that homeless people are easy targets for robberies and violent crimes, and that there needs to be more protections in place. Donny Green said he had witnessed people run over and assault homeless people in the area.

Beau Gadegaard was put on administrative leave and investigated after the shootout. The investigation cleared him of any wrongdoing. His suspension ended on July 12, 2026.

On May 27, 2026, the LMPD held a press conference led by Emily McKinney where they shared their findings on Hristov. McKinney praised the actions of the officers and said she believed they had prevented a possible mass shooting. McKinney said they believe Hristov could have carried out other attacks that went unreported.

== See also ==
- Deaths in May 2026
- List of killings by law enforcement officers in the United States, May 2026
