= First Fleet (disambiguation) =

The First Fleet was the first transportation fleet of convicts from England to the Australian penal colony of Botany Bay.

First Fleet or 1st Fleet may also refer to:

- First Fleet of South Australia, a fleet from England that brought out founders of Adelaide in 1836
- 1st Fleet (Imperial Japanese Navy), the main battleship fleet of the Imperial Japanese Navy
- First Fleet (United Kingdom)
- United States First Fleet, an organizational unit of the United States Navy
- Home Fleet or First Fleet, the Royal Navy
- First Fleet, a class of boats operated by Sydney Ferries
- First Fleet, an organizational unit of the Republic of Korea Navy
- The First or Great Fleet, a legendary fleet of Māori migration canoes that settled the islands of New Zealand

== See also ==
- 1st Air Fleet of the Imperial Japanese Navy, carrier battle group comprising most of the aircraft carriers and carrier air groups of the Imperial Japanese Navy, during the first eight months of the Pacific War
- Legio I Adiutrix, a legion of the Imperial Roman Army
- Luftflotte 1, a primary division of the German Luftwaffe in World War II
- Second Fleet (disambiguation)
