= Third Fleet (disambiguation) =

The name Third Fleet or 3rd fleet can refer to:

- Third Fleet (United Kingdom)
- United States Third Fleet
- Third Fleet (Australia), part of the British effort of the late eighteenth century to colonise Australia
- IJN 3rd Fleet, Imperial Japanese Navy
- Third Fleet, an organizational unit of the Republic of Korea Navy
- Luftflotte 3

== See also ==
- Second Fleet (disambiguation)
- Fourth Fleet (disambiguation)
