= Fifth Fleet (disambiguation) =

Fifth Fleet or 5th fleet may mean:

- United States Fifth Fleet
- IJN 5th Fleet, Imperial Japanese Navy
- Luftflotte 5

== See also ==
- Fourth Fleet (disambiguation)
- Sixth Fleet (disambiguation)
