= Fleet (surname) =

Fleet is a surname. Notable people with the surname include:

- Anthony Fleet (born 1965), Australian darts player
- Charles Browne Fleet (1843-1916), American pharmacist
- David Fleet (born 1954), Canadian politician
- Frank Fleet (1848-1900), American baseball player
- Frederick Fleet (1887-1965), British sailor and Titanic survivor
- Greg Fleet (born 1960), Australian comedian
- Henry Fleet (b. 1602), English trader in Virginia and Maryland
- Henry Louis Fleet (1850-1923), British naval officer
- James Fleet (born 1954), British actor
- John Faithfull Fleet (1847–1917), historian, epigraphist and linguist
- John Fleet (Lord Mayor) (1648–1712), Member of Parliament and Sheriff for London
- John Fleet (MP), Member of Parliament for Weymouth and Melcombe Regis (UK Parliament constituency) in 1397
- Larry Fleet, American singer
- Mac Fleet (born 1990), American mid-distance runner
- Pat Fleet (born 1943), American voice actress
- Preston Fleet (1934–1995), American businessman
- Reuben H. Fleet (1887–1975), American aviation pioneer
- Snowy Fleet (1940–2025), English-born Australian drummer
- Stephen Fleet (1936–2006), British administrator

== See also ==
- Stephan Szpak-Fleet (born 1979), Polish-born American actor
- Van Fleet, a list of people with the surname
