= SECURA Insurance =

Mutual insurance company in Fox Crossing, Wisconsin

- Type: Mutual
- Industry: Insurance
- Founded: 1900
- Headquarters: Fox Crossing, Wisconsin, United States
- Key people: Garth Wicinsky, President/CEO
- Services: business; farm; non-profit organization; special events
- Number of employees: 1000
- Website: www.secura.net

SECURA Insurance is a mutual insurance company in the United States that offers property and casualty insurance through independent insurance agents in 13 states. The company provides insurance for businesses, farms, nonprofit organizations, and special events. The company headquarters is located in Fox Crossing, Wisconsin. SECURA employs approximately 1000 people.

In 2019, SECURA moved their headquarters to a new building in Fox Crossing, about 3.75 miles (6.04 km) west of the old location in Appleton.

== History ==
=== Early Years and Founding ===
SECURA was founded in 1900 by Julius Bubolz after a massive cyclone tore through New Richmond, Wisconsin, destroying homes and businesses, killing more than 100 people, and injuring 500 others. To protect themselves and each other, 135 charter members in the Cicero Township developed The Farmers Home Mutual Hail, Tornado, and Cyclone Insurance Company of Seymour, Wisconsin. After several decades of growth, the company moved into an office building in downtown Appleton. By 1935 an auto insurance division was launched called Home Mutual Casualty Company.

=== Gordon Bubolz Years ===
After graduating law school and previously working as an assistant secretary, Julius' son Gordon Bubolz became the company's second CEO in the late 1930's and maintained that position until 1981. The company moved to a new construction site on South Memorial Drive in 1963. Several new companies were launched including offerings for Life Insurance, Securities and Financial services.

=== John Bubolz Years ===
In 1986, this insurance company was renamed from Home Mutual to SECURA under John Bubolz' leadership.

=== Recent History ===
Other CEO's include John Bykowski from 1997-2014, and David Gross from 2014-2022. In 2019, SECURA moved their headquarters to a new building in Fox Crossing, about 3.75 miles (6.04 km) west of the old location in Appleton.

== Community involvement ==
SECURA supports a variety of community organizations by volunteering to serve on boards and committees, and by participating in fundraising efforts. SECURA regularly partners with the United Way and The Boys and Girls Club.

== Sustainability ==
SECURA has a long history focused on sustainability and conservation going back when Gordon Bubolz was leading the company in the mid 1900's. SECURA has a large solar field at their current headquarters that helps power their own building. SECURA earned the WELL certification becoming only the second building in Wisconsin to earn that designation.

== Recognition ==
- “A”(Excellent) rating from A.M. Best.
- Certified Great Place to Work (2024)
- Ranked by independent agents as a top ten performer for Making Business Easier every year since 2006. (2006–2015)
- Platinum Well Workplace Award winner by Wellness Council of America (WELCOA)
