= Fourth Fleet (disambiguation) =

Fourth Fleet or 4th fleet may mean:

- Fourth Fleet (Australia), an unofficial term for convict ships from England in 1792
- United States Fourth Fleet
- IJN 4th Fleet, Imperial Japanese Navy
- Luftflotte 4

== See also ==
- Third Fleet (disambiguation)
- Fifth Fleet (disambiguation)
