= Sixth Fleet (disambiguation) =

Sixth Fleet or 6th fleet may refer to:

- United States Sixth Fleet
- IJN 6th Fleet, Imperial Japanese Navy
- Luftflotte 6
- Sixth Fleet (wargame), a 1975 Cold War wargame that simulates combat in the Mediterranean between Soviet forces and the American Sixth Fleet

== See also ==
- Fifth Fleet (disambiguation)
- Seventh Fleet (disambiguation)
