= Fleet Farm =

American general merchandise retail chain

Fleet Farm E-Commerce Enterprises LLC
- "Proudly Serving the Midwest since 1955"

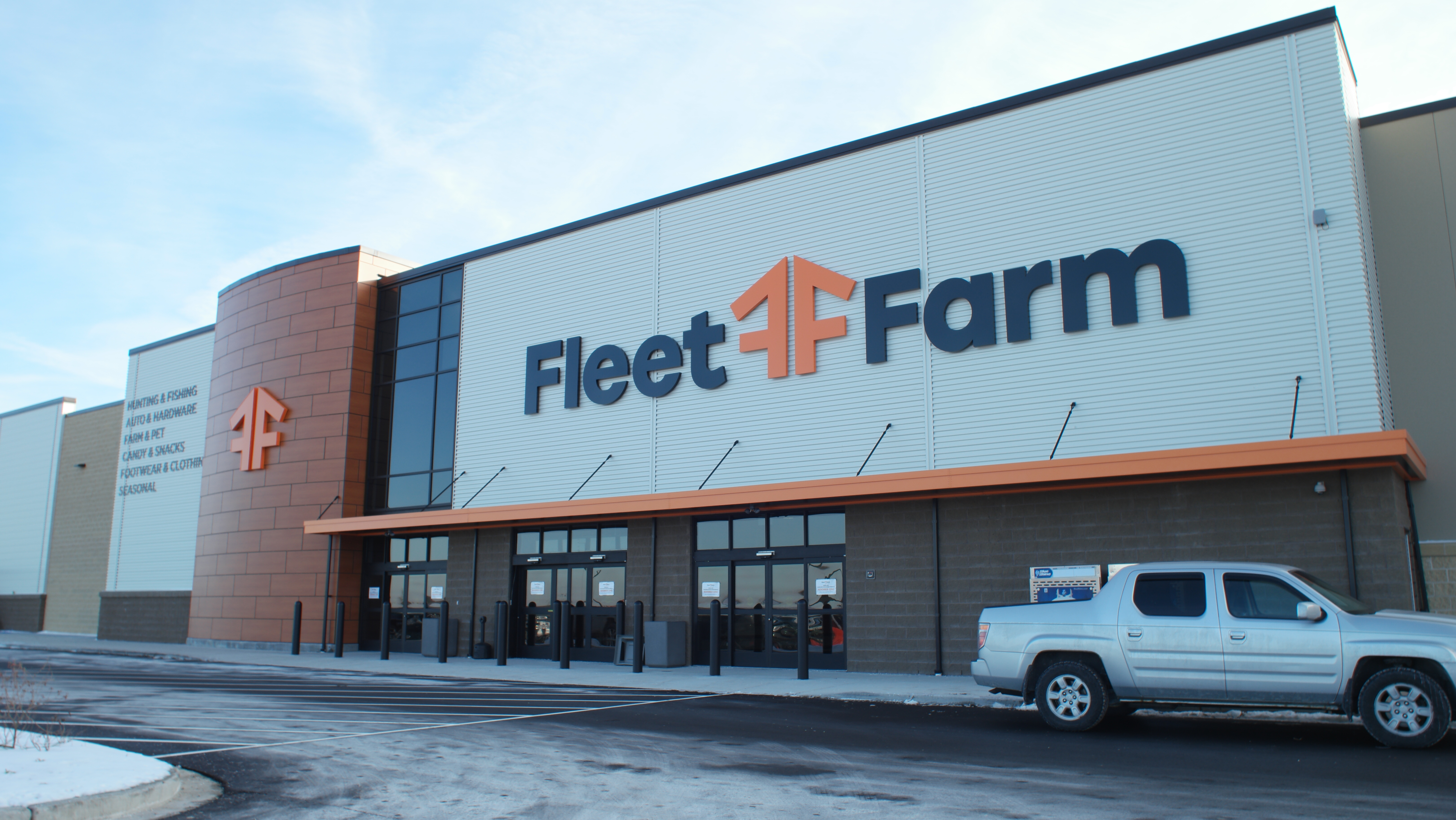
- A Fleet Farm store in West Bend, Wisconsin.
- Trade name: Fleet Farm
- Formerly: Mills Fleet Farm (prior to 2018)
- Type: Subsidiary
- Industry: Retail
- Founded: 1955; 71 years ago, in Marshfield, Wisconsin, U.S.
- Founders: Stewart Mills Sr. Stewart Mills Jr. Henry Mills II.
- Headquarters: 2401 S Memorial Dr, Appleton, Wisconsin, United States
- Number of locations: 53 (As of August 2023)
- Area served: Minnesota, Iowa, Wisconsin, North Dakota and South Dakota
- Key people: Nick Widi (president)
- Products: Hunting and fishing equipment & licenses, small appliances, household goods, automotive goods, clothing and footwear, toys, food, hardware, lawn and garden supplies, paint, pet supplies, sporting goods, tools, and farm supplies.
- Revenue: ▲US$ 712.3 million (2022)
- Owner: KKR & Co.
- Number of employees: 6,600 (2023)
- Website: www.fleetfarm.com

Fleet Farm E-Commerce Enterprises LLC (formerly Mills Fleet Farm) is an American retail chain of 50 stores in Minnesota, Iowa, Wisconsin, North Dakota and South Dakota. Headquartered in Appleton, Wisconsin, the company has a main distribution center in Chippewa Falls, Wisconsin, with a buying/support office and warehouse in Appleton.

The stores range in size from small hardware store formats to larger stores. They sell hunting and fishing equipment and licenses, small appliances, household goods, automotive goods, clothing and footwear, toys, food, hardware, lawn and garden supplies, paint, pet supplies, sporting goods, tools, and farm supplies. Most locations also have an auto service center, gas mart, and car wash.

On July 10, 2019, Fleet Farm announced that it had reached a deal with SECURA Insurance to purchase their current headquarters building in Appleton. Fleet Farm moved its headquarters to the former SECURA Insurance building in 2020.

== History ==
Stewart C. Mills Sr. founded Mills Companies in Brainerd, Minnesota in 1922. The family later created an oil company and opened a dealership and auto parts stores. Fleet Farm was founded in 1955 by Stewart Mills Sr. and his sons Henry Mills II and Stewart Mills Jr. The first store, named Fleet Wholesale Supply, was opened in Marshfield, Wisconsin.

Similarly named Blain's Farm and Fleet was also founded in 1955 by Bert and Claude Blain, friends of the Mills family. The two families agreed to use similar names and have historically operated in different territories.

Since 2000, most locations that have opened feature a signature orange-roofed silo on the storefront.

In 2016, Mills Fleet Farm was sold to KKR. As of July 2018, the "Mills" part of the name has been dropped, shortening the name to "Fleet Farm," however many stores still carry the "Mills" name on their signs. In addition, Fleet Farm launched a new brand campaign and added the tagline “Built for real life”, replacing the slogan "We Love It" which debuted in 2009. In September 2025 Fleet Farm celebrated its 70th Anniversary.

== Straw Purchase Gun Sales Lawsuit ==
In October 2022, the Minnesota Attorney General's office filed suit against Fleet Farm after a straw-purchased gun was used in a St. Paul bar shootout that injured more than a dozen people and killed a bystander. The lawsuit alleged Fleet Farm sold 37 firearms to two people over 16 months. The company agreed to pay one million dollars, improve corporate-wide employee training, use software to track gun sales and alert employees about sales to people previously linked to guns used in crimes.

== Store brands ==
Fleet Farm carries a variety of store brands in a variety of departments. These include: Road Runner - Batteries and tires, Big Max - Trailers and automotive supplies, Field and Forest - Clothing and footwear, Fleet Boutique - Women's clothing, Dura-Built - Farm supplies, Milkhouse brand - Dairy supplies, Farm Life - Animal supplements, Sprout - Animal feed, Mills Fleet Farm - Candy and nuts, Farm Toys.

== Images ==
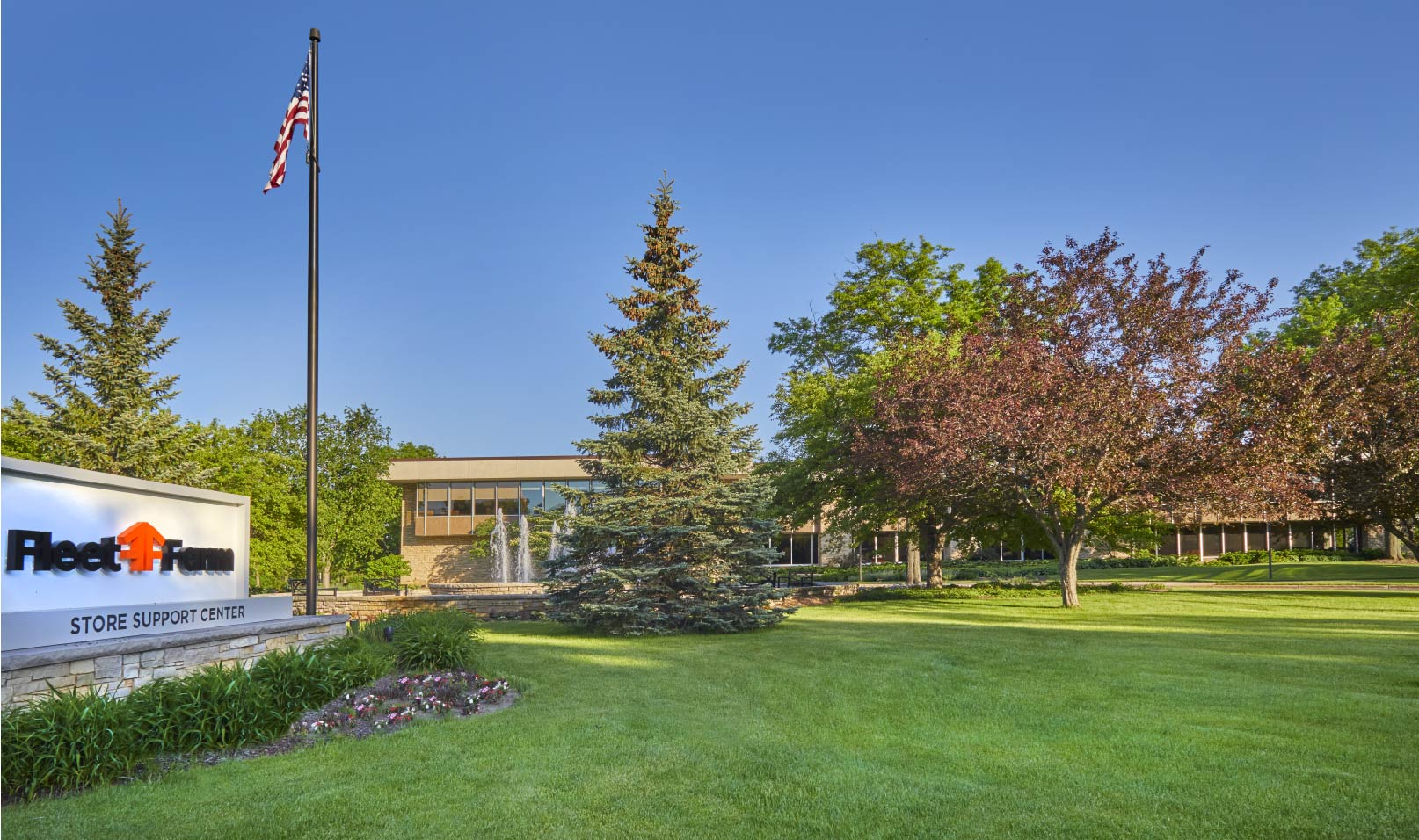
Fleet Farm Corporate Office in Appleton, Wisconsin

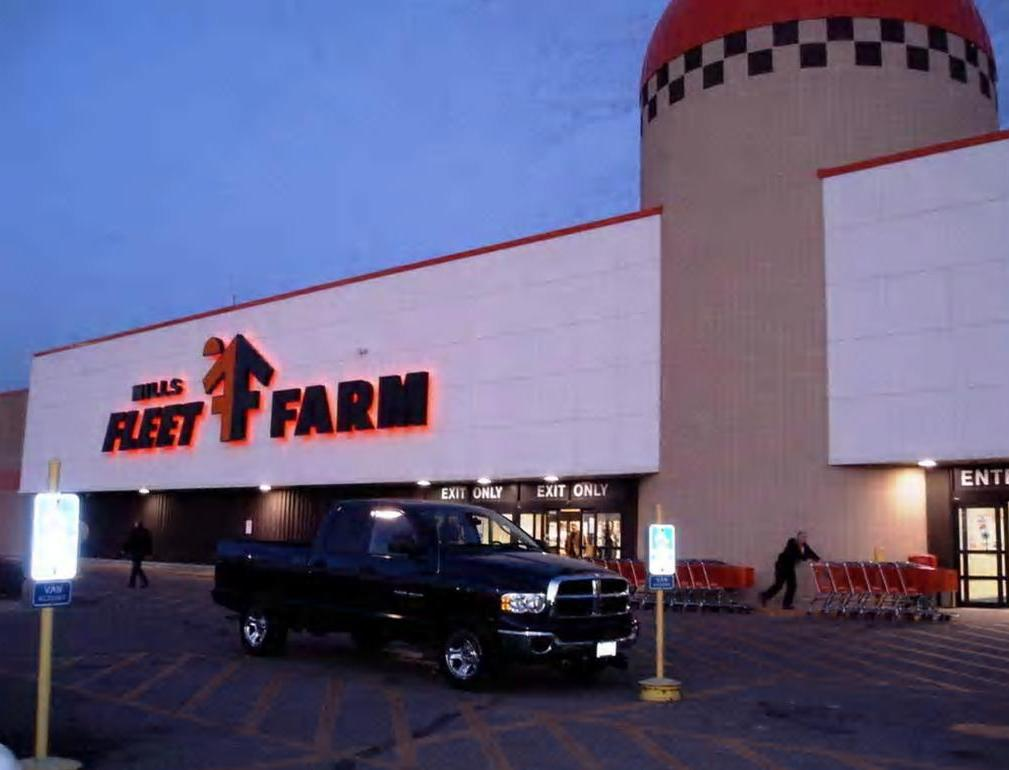
A store in Appleton, Wisconsin

Typical Mills Fleet Farm Sign

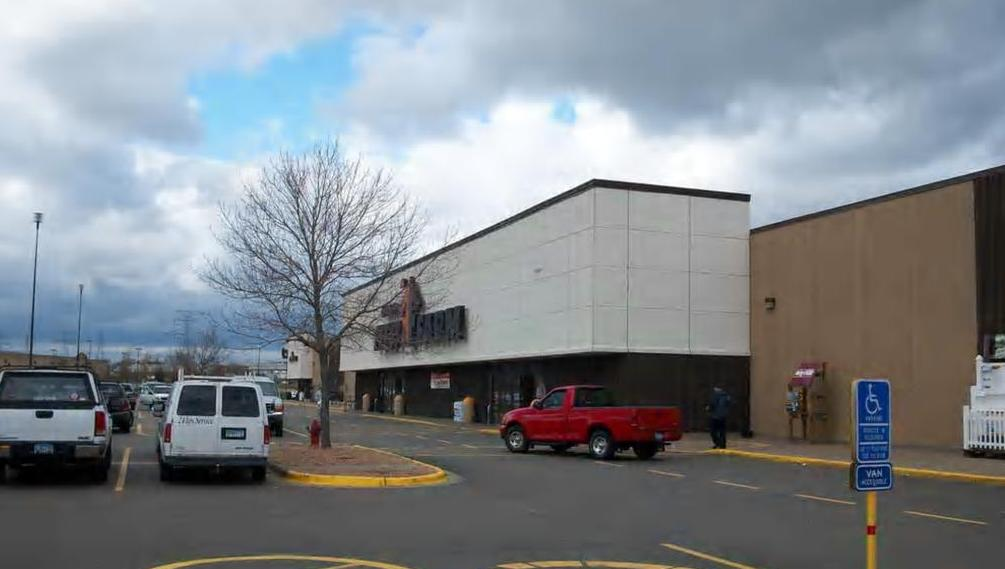
Oakdale, Minnesota store

Logo used until July 2018.
