= Blain's Farm & Fleet =

Regional chain of farm supply retail stores in the Upper Midwest

Blain Supply, Inc.

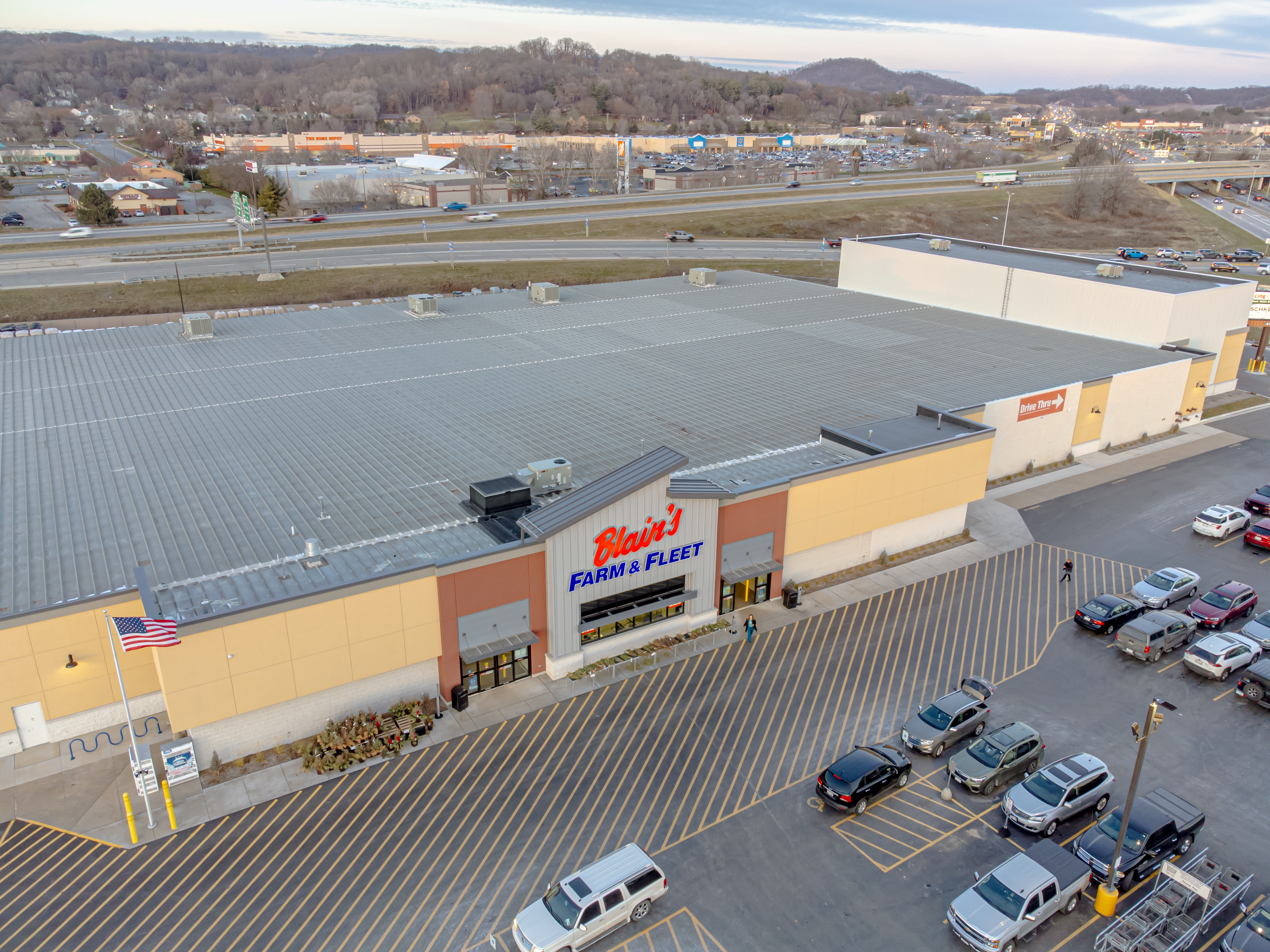
- Store in Onalaska, Wisconsin
- Trade name: Blain's Farm & Fleet
- Type: Private; family business
- Industry: Retail
- Founded: 1955
- Founder: William Claude (W.C.) Blain; Norman Albert "Bert" (N.B.) Blain
- Headquarters: Janesville, Wisconsin, United States
- Number of locations: 45 stores (2024)
- Products: Clothing, footwear, housewares, lawn & garden, farm equipment, automotive, sporting goods, hunting fishing, toys
- Revenue: ▲US$ 512 million (2022)
- Number of employees: 5,500 (2024)
- Website: FarmAndFleet.com

Blain Supply, Inc., doing business as Blain's Farm & Fleet, is a regional, family-owned chain of 45 farm supply retail stores in four states (Wisconsin, Illinois, Iowa and Michigan) of the Upper Midwest region of the United States. Blain's Farm & Fleet was an early adopter of "buy online, pick up at the store" in which all stores provide a drive-thru pick-up experience so online orders can be retrieved without consumers having to leave the car. Blain’s also promotes a Best Price Promise, where they guarantee that they sell the lowest prices on any of the products they sell. If not, varying the product and the company guidelines, they will match the price of another competing business.

== History ==
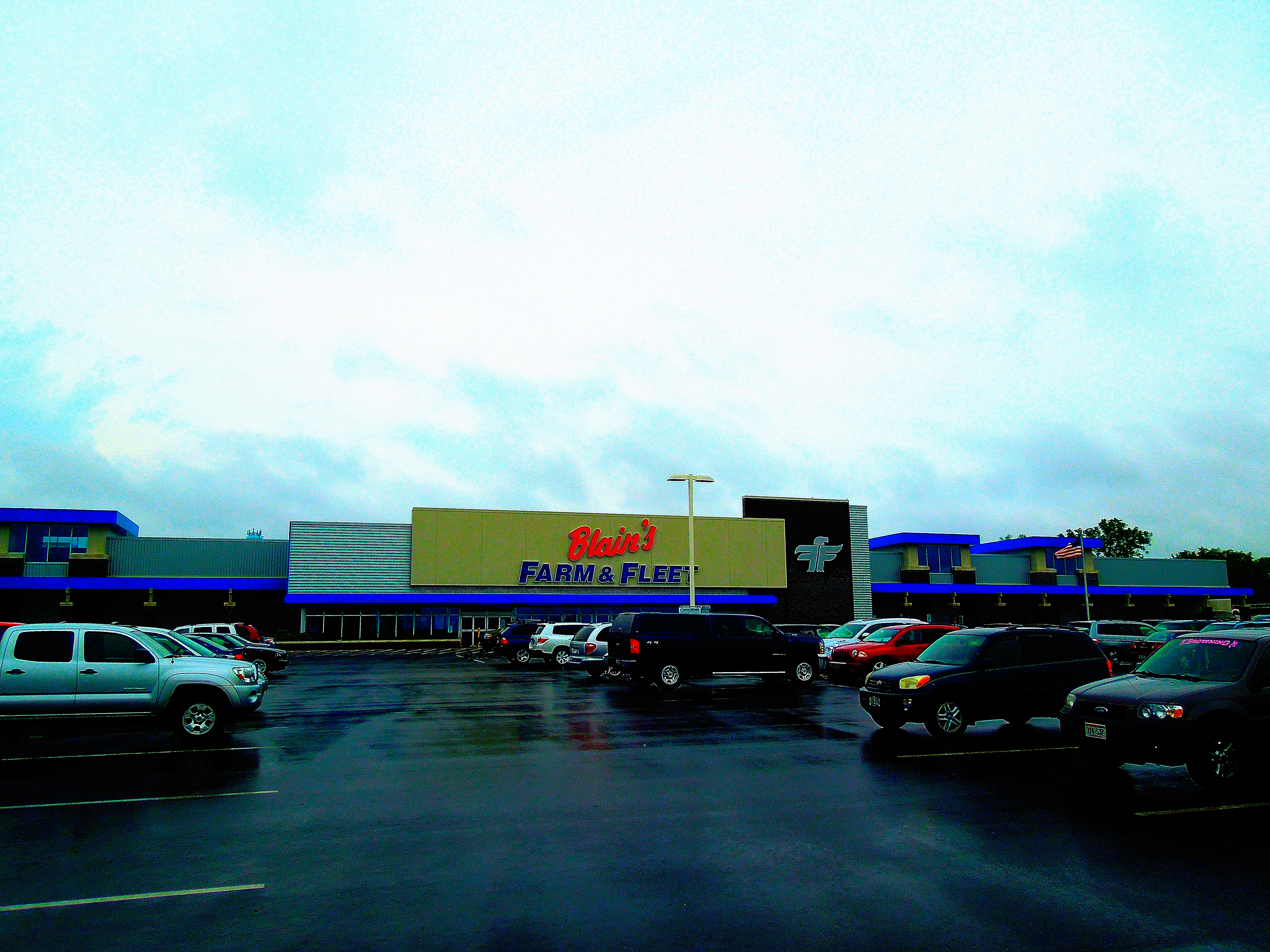
Blain's Farm & Fleet location in Verona, Wisconsin

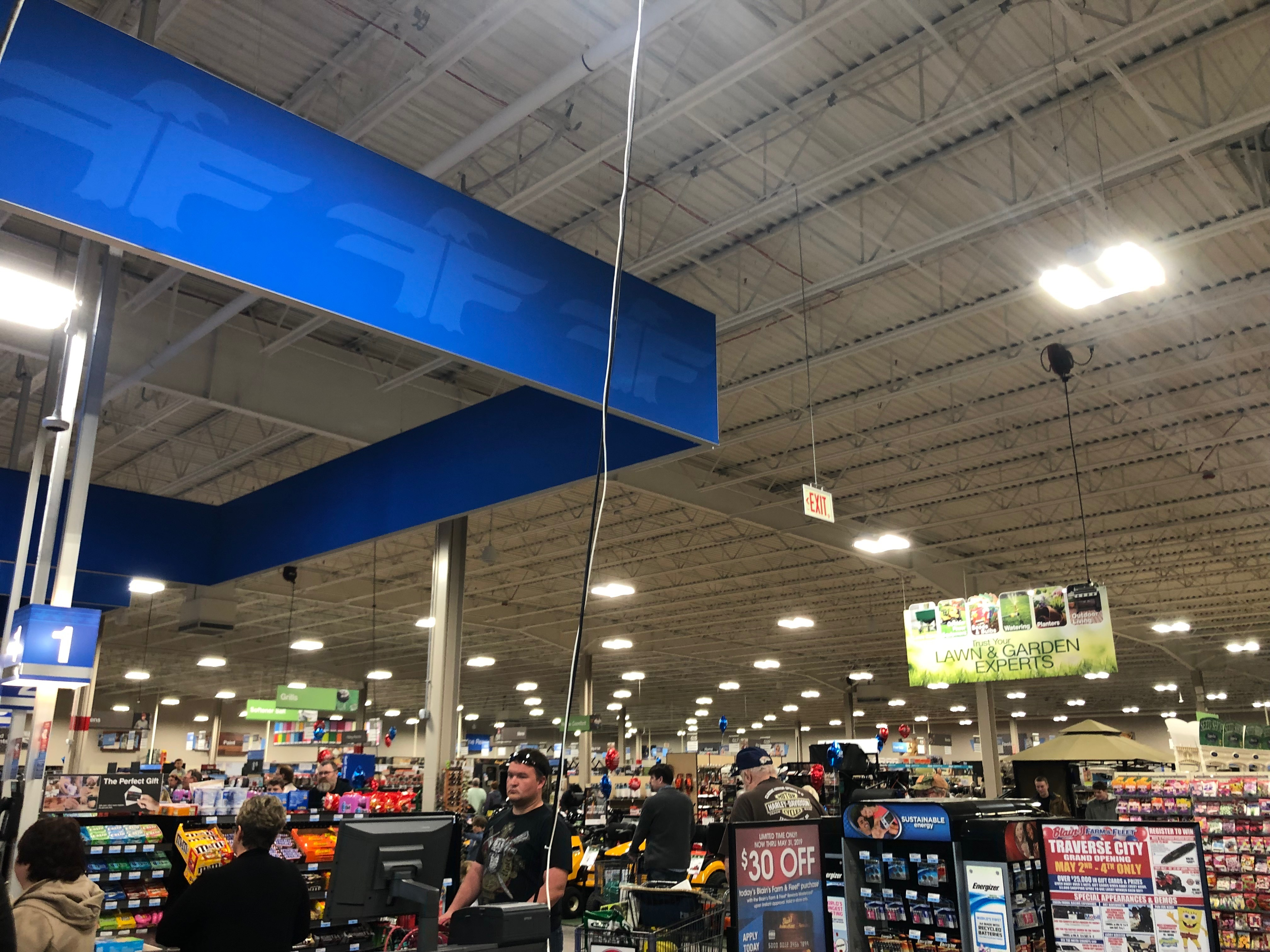
Interior of a recently opened Blain's location in Traverse City, Michigan

Blain's founders, W. C. "Claude" Blain and N. A. "Bert" Blain grew up on a dairy farm in Ladysmith, Wisconsin, where they helped their father establish a feed operation and farm implements store. Later on, Claude and Bert worked as businessmen in the automotive industry, managing a Chevrolet and Oldsmobile dealership in northwestern Wisconsin. In 1955, the brothers had decided to get back into the farm supply business, where they could sell farming equipment and supplies at a low cost for Wisconsin farmers. The company was founded in Janesville, Wisconsin, in June 1955, where the brothers purchased an old meat market and opened their very first store. Similarly-named Mills Fleet Farm was also founded in 1955 in Marshfield, Wisconsin by Blain family friends, brothers Stew and Henry Mills. The two families agreed to use similar names and have historically operated in different territories.

Blain’s was one of many companies in Wisconsin involved in a retail revolution during the 1950’s. In 1937, federal and state law had prohibited discounts for customers; retailers being required to abide by the prices set by their manufacturers. Blain’s wanted to be the ones able to determine the prices of products sold in their stores. The “fleet’’ concept, which allowed a direct discount to customers, if they were able to prove that they owned a fleet consisting of five or more enginesThese customers included farmers, who owned numerous tractors and other farming vehicles. This led to many retailers, including the Blain’s and Mill’s, to add “fleet” to their stores’ titles.

Each Blain's retail store is part of Farm and Fleet Stores which operate in four divisions by region, while the distribution is handled by a separate entity, Blain Supply. The business is a family-owned, privately held corporation run by President and CEO Jane Blain Gilbertson since her brother, Robert Blain, retired in 2014. Robert had been President since 1993, taking over after the death of Bert Blain. The chain has one distribution center in Janesville. In January 2018, the company announced it would be expanding into Michigan with 5 stores located in Portage, Jackson, Traverse City, Holland and Walker.

== Store Locations ==
Throughout the Upper Midwest, Blain's Farm & Fleet has several stores located in 4 states:

=== Wisconsin ===
- Baraboo, Chippewa Falls, Dodgeville, Grafton, Janesville, Madison, Monroe, Oak Creek, La Crosse (Onalaska), Platteville, Rhinelander, Rice Lake, Sturtevant, Verona, Watertown, Waukesha

=== Illinois ===
- Belvidere, Bloomington, Bourbonnais, Decatur, Elgin, Freeport, Geneseo, Loves Park, Moline, Montgomery, Morton, Ottawa, Rockford, Rockton, Romeoville, Sterling, Sycamore, Urbana, Woodstock

=== Iowa ===
- Cedar Falls, Clinton, Davenport, Dubuque, Muscatine

=== Michigan ===
- Holland, Jackson, Portage, Traverse City, Standale (Walker)

== Products ==
Blain's stores sell tires, agricultural supplies and equipment, hunting and fishing equipment and licenses, kitchen appliances, housewares, automotive goods, men's, women's, and kid's clothing and shoes, household hardware, lawn and garden supplies, outdoor power tools, pumps and generators, paint, pet supplies, candy, sporting goods, tools and toys. During the holiday season, the annual Toyland opens, which offers a wide range selection for children 0-12 years old. Toyland has toys, games, and other children entertainment

== Blain's Farm & Fleet Day ==
Wisconsin Governor Tony Evers on September 4th, 2025 wrote a proclamation that established the date September 17th in the state of Wisconsin as "Blain's Farm & Fleet Day'', in honor of the company's 70th anniversary. Throughout the proclamation, Governor Evers recognizes Blain's Wisconsin roots, and the growth as a company for seven decades, expanding to 45 stores across the Upper Midwest, the variety of products and services the company offers to their customers, and for their dedicated service to their communities, along with local organizations and clubs such as the Bert Blain Memorial Heart Walk, 4-H, FFA scholarships, pet adoption events, and more. At the end of the proclamation, the governor wished Blain's for continuing success and service throughout the company in the future.
