= Second Fleet (disambiguation) =

The United States Second Fleet is a numbered fleet of the U.S. Navy.

Second (or 2nd) Fleet may also refer to:

- Second Fleet (Australia), the second convict party sent to Port Jackson in 1790
- Second Fleet (United Kingdom), a reserve formation of the Royal Navy 1912–1914
- Second Fleet, a unit of the Republic of Korea Navy
- 2nd Fleet (Imperial Japanese Navy), 1903–1945
- Legio II Adiutrix, a legion of the Imperial Roman Army
- Luftflotte 2, a primary division of the German Luftwaffe in World War II
