= Satyagraha (disambiguation) =

Satyagraha is a form of nonviolent resistance as formulated by Mahatma Gandhi.

Satyagraha may also refer to:

== Media ==
- Satyagrah, a Hindi version of the Indian news website Scroll.in
- Satyagraha (film), a 2013 Indian Hindi-language film
- Satyagraha (opera), a 1979 opera by Philip Glass

== People ==
- Satya Graha (journalist), Indonesian journalist
- Satyagraha Hoerip, Indonesian writer

== Places ==
- Satyagraha Ashram or Sabarmati Ashram, residence of Gandhi in Sabarmati, India
- Satyagraha House, residence of Gandhi in Johannesburg, South Africa

== Others ==
- Satyagrah Express, passenger train in India
- "Satyagrah se Swachhagrah", a slogan of the Clean India Mission
