= Naujamiestis =

Naujamiestis (literally: new city in Lithuanian) can refer to:

- Kudirkos Naumiestis, a city in Šakiai district municipality, Lithuania
- Naujamiestis, Panevėžys, a town in Panevėžys district municipality, Lithuania
- Naujamiestis Eldership (Panevėžys)
- Naujamiestis, Vilnius, a neighborhood in Vilnius, capital of Lithuania
- Žemaičių Naumiestis, a town in Šilutė district municipality, Lithuania
