= Gandhi House =

Gandhi House is the nickname of several buildings where Mahatma Gandhi lived or which use Gandhi as their inspiration:

- Satyagraha House, a house built for Gandhi and Hermann Kallerbach in Johannesburg
- Gandhi House, Troyeville, a former home and heritage site in Troyeville, Johannesburg
- Gandhi House, Nandi Hills, India
- Kaba Gandhi No Delo, Rajkot, Gujarat, India
