= Arop House =

Building in Johannesburg, South Africa

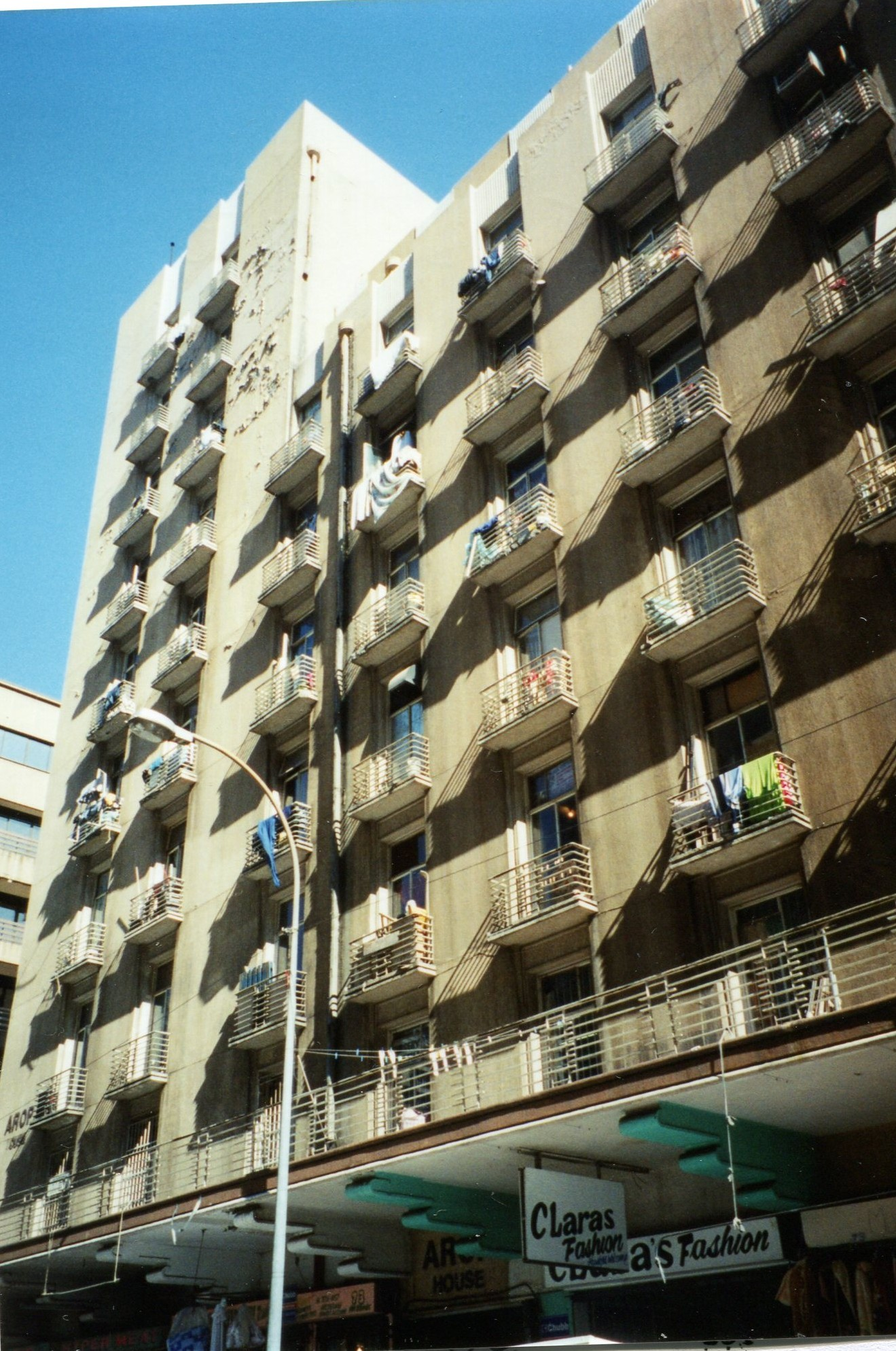
- The Arop House Building in cnr von Brandis, Kerk Str
- Interactive map of the Arop House area

General information
- Status: Completed
- Location: Johannesburg, South Africa
- Coordinates: 26.202°S 28.044°E
- Completed: 4 March 1932

Height
- Roof: 102 metres (335 ft)

Technical details
- Floor count: 7

Design and construction
- Architects: Kallenbach, Kennedy & Furner

The Arop House is a building in Von Brandis & Kerk Street, Johannesburg, South Africa. Construction commenced in 1931 and completed in 1932 by Hermann Kallenbach, a close friend of Mahatma Gandhi, along with his partners Kennedy and Furner. The building is characterized by balconies with steel balusterades and its name was inspired by a Soviet petroleum company with the same name As of 2014, the building is in a dilapidated state.
