= Ruskalva =

Ruskalva may refer to:

- An ancient burial place in Vilkyčiai
- An ancient burial place in Užšustis
