= Satyagraha (opera) =

1980 opera by Philip Glass

- Opera by Philip Glass
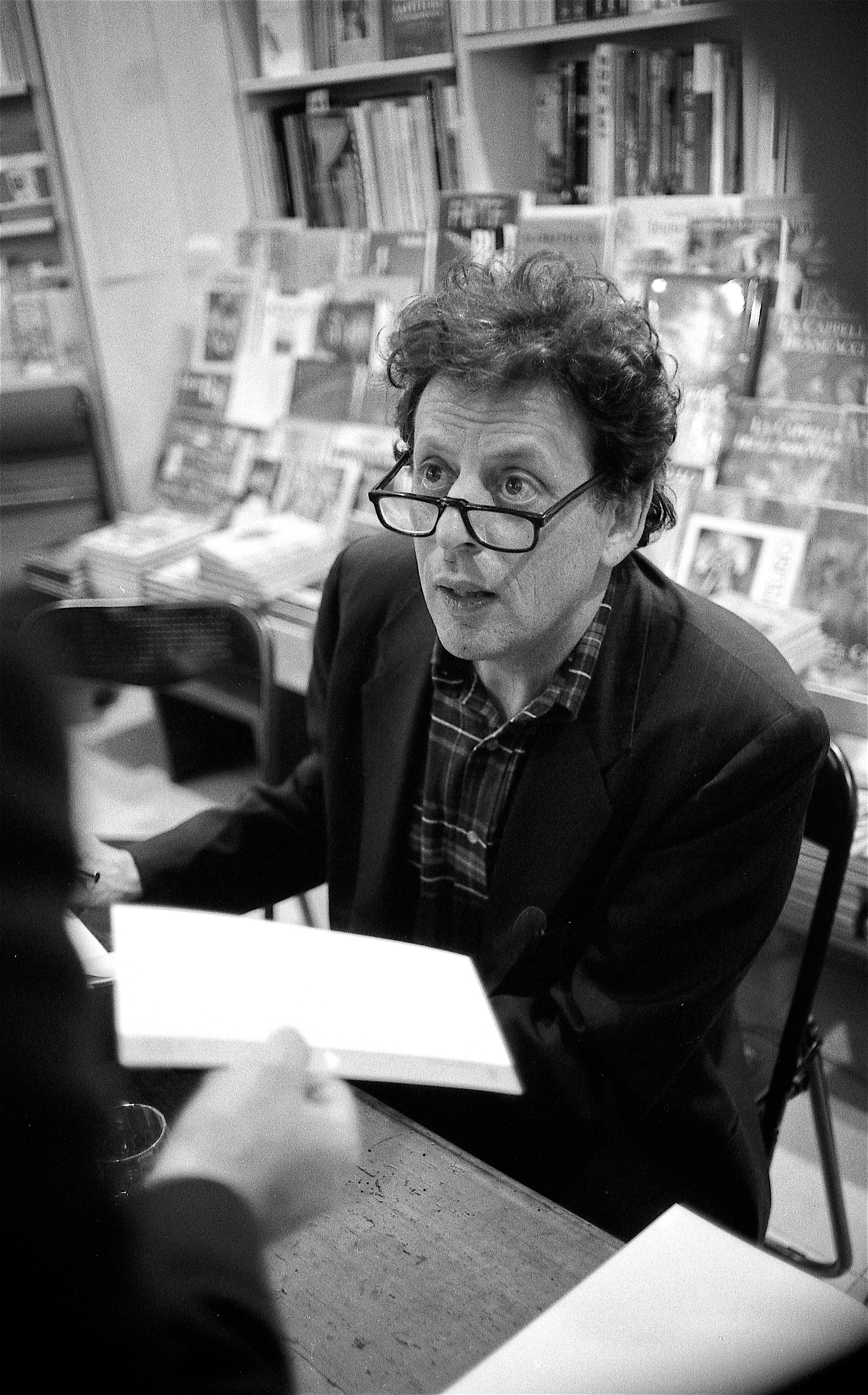
- The composer in 1993
- Librettist: Philip Glass; Constance DeJong
- Based on: life of Mahatma Gandhi
- Premiere: September 5, 1980; Schouwburg

Satyagraha (/ˈsɑːtjəˈɡrɑːhɑː/; Sanskrit सत्याग्रह, satyāgraha "insistence on truth") is a 1980 opera in three acts for orchestra, chorus and soloists, composed by Philip Glass, with a libretto by Glass and Constance DeJong.

Loosely based on the life of Mahatma Gandhi, it forms the second part of Glass's "Portrait Trilogy" of operas about men who changed the world, which also includes Einstein on the Beach and Akhnaten.

Glass's style can broadly be described as minimalist. The work is scored for 2 sopranos, 2 mezzo-sopranos, 2 tenors, a baritone, 2 basses, a large SATB chorus, and an orchestra of strings and woodwinds only, no brass or percussion. Principal roles are Sonja Schlesin, Mahatma Gandhi, Hermann Kallenbach and Parsi Rustomji.

The title refers to Gandhi's concept of nonviolent resistance to injustice, satyagraha, and the text, from the Bhagavad Gita, is sung in the original Sanskrit. In performance, translation is usually provided in supertitles.

== Roles ==
Role	Voice type
M. K. Gandhi	tenor
Lord Krishna	bass
Parsi Rustomji	bass
Mrs Alexander	mezzo-soprano
Mrs Naidoo	soprano
Kasturbai	mezzo-soprano
Mrs Schlesen	soprano
Mr. Kallenbach	baritone
Prince Arjuna	baritone

== Performance history ==
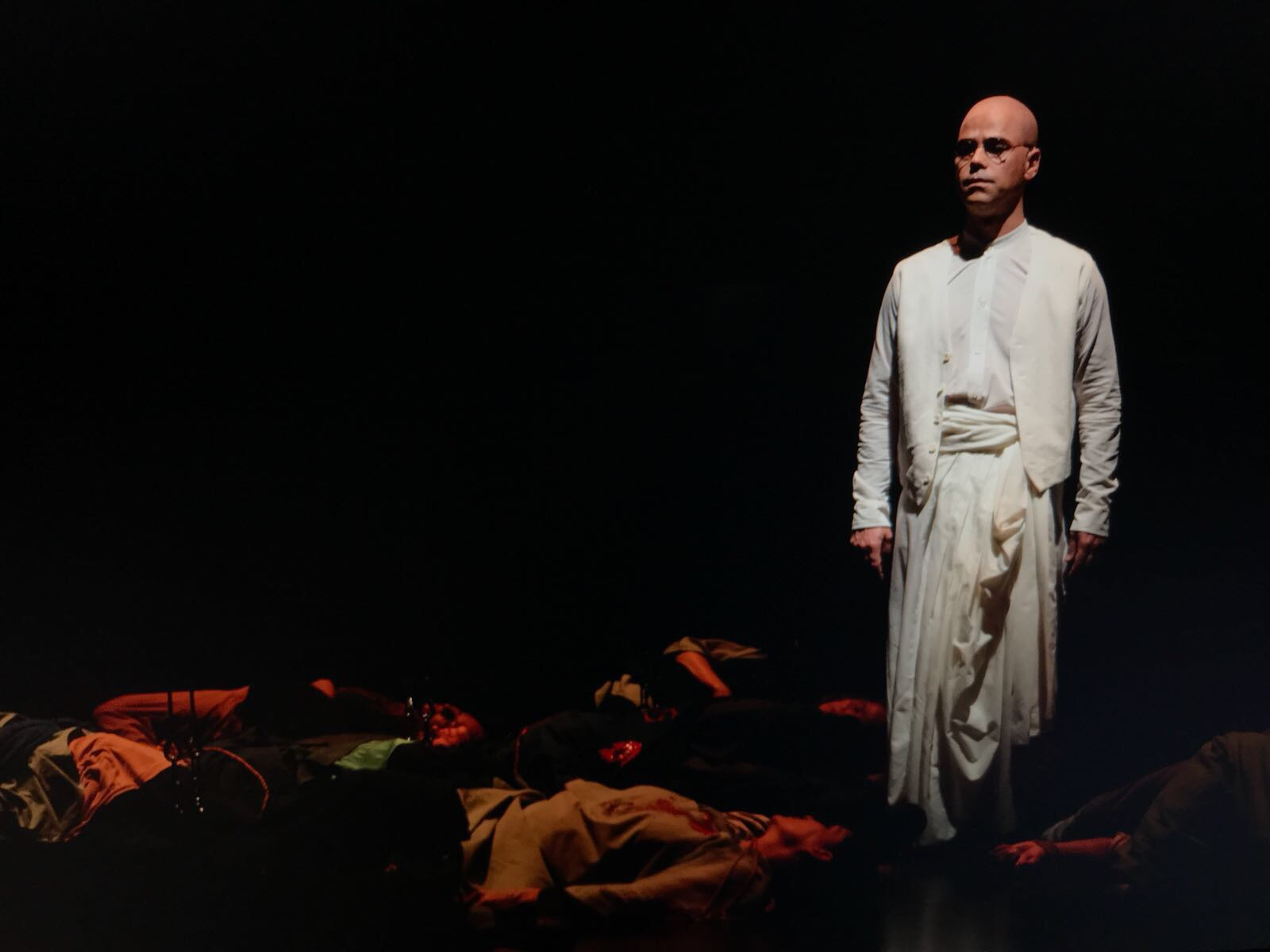
Gandhi in Berlin, performed 25 October 2017

Satyagraha was commissioned by the city of Rotterdam, Netherlands, and first performed at the Schouwburg (Municipal Theatre) there on September 5, 1980, by the Netherlands Opera, featuring the choir of the Rotterdam Conservatory and the Utrecht Symphony Orchestra, conducted by Bruce Ferden.

The opera premiered in North America at the Artpark in Lewiston, New York, on July 29, 1981. That production was mounted later that year at the Brooklyn Academy of Music. The opera was also staged that same year by the Stuttgart Opera (which went on to perform the complete trilogy in 1990); this production was taped during its revival in 1983 and released on video.

The Lyric Opera of Chicago presented the first production by a major international opera company on September 28, 1987, at the Civic Opera House. Douglas Perry sang the role of Gandhi.

The UK premiere was a joint production by Bath Spa University and Frome Community College in the theatre of Kingswood School in Bath in 1997.

There was a performance by San Francisco Opera at the War Memorial Opera House in 1989.

Silviu Purcărete staged a new production of the opera in 2004 at the Theater Bonn, Germany, with a revival in 2013, with Ulrich Windfuhr conducting the Beethoven Orchester Bonn.

A new staging by the English National Opera and Improbable theatre, co-produced by the Metropolitan Opera, opened in London in April 2007 and in New York in April 2008. It was revived in London in February 2010 and in New York in November 2011; the New York performance on November 19 was part of the Met Opera: Live in HD series. It aired on Great Performances from PBS in 2012, Season 39 Episode 19 on March 22 and March 25. The Metropolitan Opera's 2011 production was streamed online on June 21 and November 1, 2020.

On September 16, 2014, a new production was staged at the Ekaterinburg State Academic Opera in Russia. The creative team included Thaddeus Strassberger (direction and scenic design), Mattie Ullrich (costume design) and Oliver von Dohnányi (conductor).

A new production by Folkoperan and Cirkus Cirkör, directed by Tilde Björfors and conducted by Matthew Wood premiered in Stockholm on September 14, 2016. It was revived twice in Stockholm in April 2017 and in May 2018. The production also went on tour to Stora Teatern in May 2017, to the Copenhagen Opera Festival in August 2018 and to the Brooklyn Academy of Music's Harvey Theater in October – November 2018. Leif Aruhn-Solén sang the role of Gandhi nearly 50 times and is therefore likely the singer who has performed the role the most.

On 18 November 2018, Vlaamse Opera premiered a production by director and choreographer Sidi Larbi Cherkaoui, together with stage designer Henrik Ahr and costume designer Jan-Jan Van Essche.

Paris Opera premiered a new production of Satyagraha on 10 April 2026, with direction and choreography by Bobbi Jene Smith and Or Schraiber.

== Synopsis ==
The opera is in three acts, each referencing a major related cultural figure.

=== Act 1 ===
Leo Tolstoy

- On the Kuru Field of Justice
- Tolstoy Farm (1910)
- The Vow (1906)

=== Act 2 ===
Rabindranath Tagore

- Confrontation and Rescue (1896)
- Indian Opinion (1906)
- Protest (1908)

=== Act 3 ===
Martin Luther King Jr.

- The Newcastle March (1913)

== Recordings ==
- Sheryl Woods (Mrs. Naidoo), Douglas Perry (M.K. Gandhi); Christopher Keene (Conductor), New York City Opera orchestra and chorus. 1984 (Sony)
- D. Anzolini; Metropolitan Opera orchestra and chorus. 2021 (Orange Mountain Music)
- Leif Aruhn-Solén (M.K. Gandhi); Magnus Sköld piano. Gandhi's Final Aria. 2023 (Aruhn-Solén Music)

== See also ==
- List of artistic depictions of Mahatma Gandhi
