= Schlomith Flaum =

Schlomith Frieda Flaum (18 March 1893 – 2 January 1963) was a Lithuanian-born educator, kindergarten teacher, and Zionist activist who became one of the earliest Jewish cultural bridges between the Indian independence movement and the Jewish community in Palestine. She moved to Palestine in 1911, and from 1922 to 1924 spent two years at Shantiniketan, the ashram-university of Rabindranath Tagore, where she also met Mahatma Gandhi, Sarojini Naidu, and Annie Besant. On returning to Jerusalem, she established a kindergarten based on Tagore's educational philosophy, and went on to publish two books and more than twenty articles in Hebrew introducing Tagore, Gandhi, and Indian culture to Jewish readers. Her life and work are documented in Shimon Lev's From Lithuania to Santiniketan: Schlomith Flaum and Rabindranath Tagore (2018).

== Biography ==
Schlomith Frieda Flaum was born in Kaunas, Lithuania on March 18, 1893.

Flaum worked as an educator and kindergarten teacher, motivated by a search for progressive teaching methods that moved beyond conventional approaches of the time.

From 1922 to 1924, Flaum lived at Shantiniketan, where she met Mahatma Gandhi, Sarojini Naidu, and Annie Besant. During these two years, Flaum became an informal cultural ambassador for Tagore's vision and the ideals of Shantiniketan. Her writings on Tagore, Gandhi, and India were collected into two books and more than twenty articles in Hebrew, introducing these figures to the broader Jewish reading public in Palestine.

She died in Israel on January 2, 1963, at the age of seventy.
