= Algis Jurgis Kundrotas =

Lithuanian physicist and academic (1950–2026)

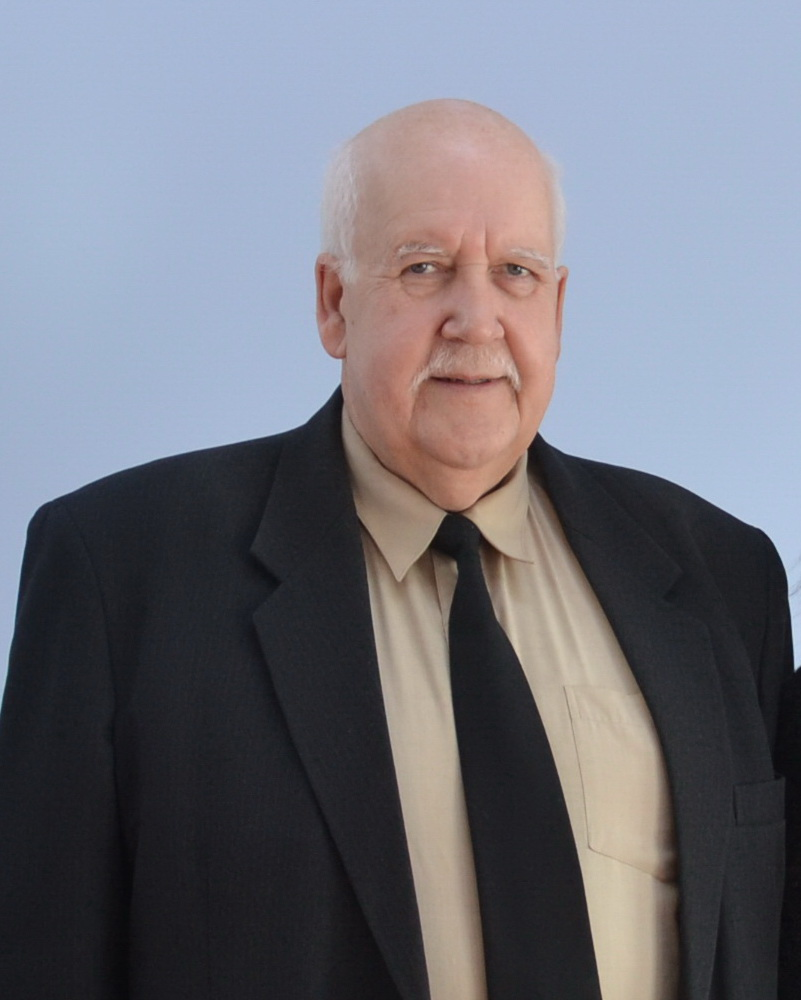
- Kundrotas in 2012
- Born: 15 July 1950; Užšustis, Šilutė district, Lithuanian SSR, USSR (now Lithuania)
- Died: 6 May 2026 (aged 75)
- Education: Doctor of Physical Sciences (Dr. Sc.), PhD
- Alma mater: Vilnius Pedagogical Institute; Vilnius University
- Occupations: Physicist; habilitated doctor of physical sciences; independent researcher
- Employers: Institute of Semiconductor Physics, Vilnius (PFI); Center for Physical Sciences and Technology (FTMC); Gediminas Technical University of Vilnius (VILNIUS TECH)
- Spouse: Bronislava (Tamašauskaitė) Kundrotienė

Signature
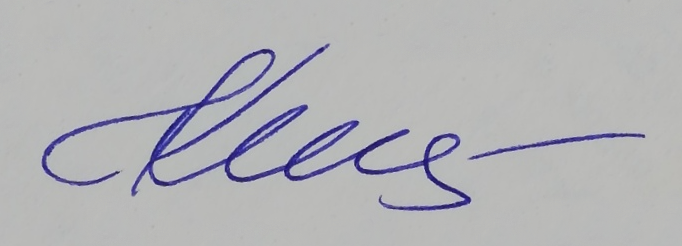

Algis Jurgis Kundrotas (15 July 1950 – 6 May 2026) was a Lithuanian physicist, habilitated doctor of physical sciences, university professor and independent researcher.

== Background ==
Kundrotas was born on 15 July 1950 in Užšustis, Šilutė district, Lithuanian SSR. (Note: In the Lithuanian Wikipedia the village where Jurgis Kundrotas was born is called Užšuščiai, but according to the Czech map documentation, it is "Užšustis", a village consisting of two sets of buildings (two solitudes separated by a forest belt about 80 metres wide are each made up of a few houses). The name "Užšustis" means in Lithuanian "behind the river Šustis", which flows about 150 metres south of the northernmost object of the village (and about 50 metres south of the southernmost object of the village). The river Šustis in its last third flows in an approximately east-west direction and south of the village of "Užšustis" forms a northward-running semicircular arc with a radius of 120 metres. The village of "Užšustis" is located about 1.5 kilometres west of the town of Žemaičių Naumiestis (Žemaičių Naumiestis Eldership, the town of Šilutė District) in western Lithuania (about 32 km east of the coast of the Gulf of Curonian Spit)) He went to Vilnius Pedagogical Institute from 1968 to 1972 where he obtained his diploma cum laude in physics. He completed his subsequent studies in Vilnius at the Semiconductor Physics Institute from 1976 to 1979 and became a candidate of physical and mathematical sciences (Doctor of Natural Sciences; Ph.D. degree) in 1981, when he defended his dissertation at Vilnius University (thesis on: Investigation of kinetic processes in narrow gap semiconductor PtSb2). He became a doctor of physical sciences in Vilnius Semiconductor Physics Institute in 1999 (thesis on: Impact ionisation of shallow impurities and excitons in A3B5 semiconductors and quantum wells).

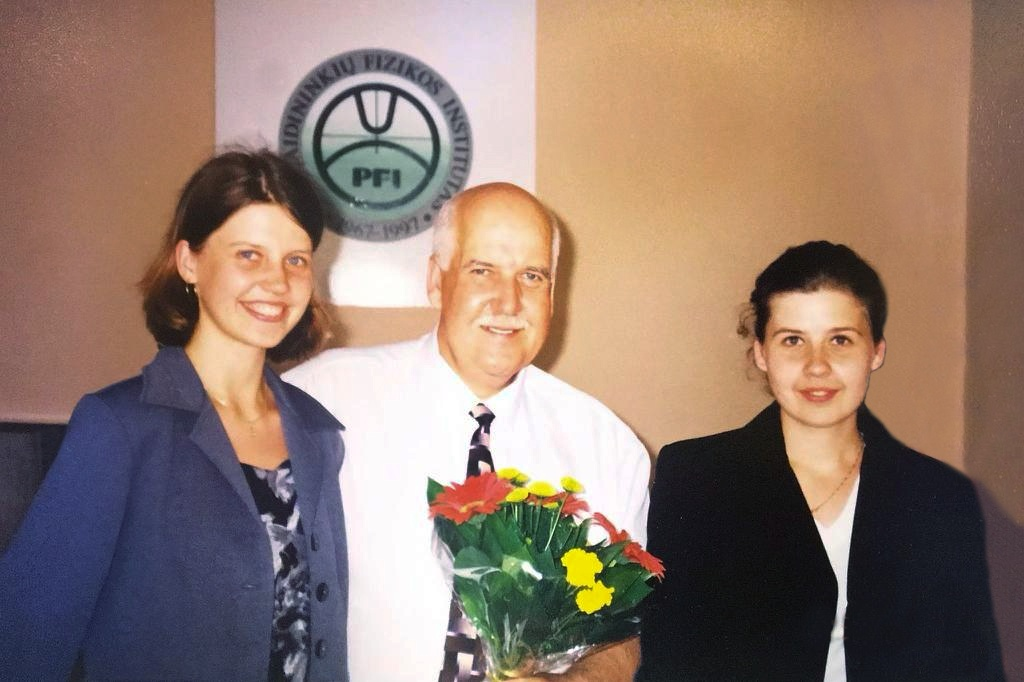
Kundrotas with his daughters (1999)

He was married to Bronislava (Tamašauskaitė) Kundrotienė, who graduated from the Pedagogical Institute in Vilnius. She gave birth to 3 children; daughters Monika Granja (born 1974), Agne Johannessen (born 1977), and a son Benas Kundrotas (born 1978). Kundrotas died on 6 May 2026, at the age of 75.

== Career ==
From 1980 to 2015, Kundrotas worked at the Semiconductor Physics Institute. (Note: The Semiconductor Physics Institute (abbreviated as PFI) was a Lithuanian research institute that operated from 1967 to 2010, conducting research and experimental development in the fields of physics, electronics, materials science, high technology and primary metrology. It participated in joint projects with Lithuanian enterprises and supported the development of the high-tech industry. In 2010, the institution was merged with the Institute of Physics and Chemistry to form the Centre for Physical and Technological Sciences.) From 1980 to 1986, he was a Junior Research Associate and from 198 to 1987, a Research Associate. He became a Senior Research Associate from 1987 to 2000. In 2001, he was appointed Chief Researcher, a position he held until 2010. From 2010 until the end of his career in 2015, Kundrotas was a Senior Researcher at the Semiconductor Physics Institute of Center for Physical Sciences and Technology (FTMC).

Kundrotas started his university teaching career as a university professor in 2002 at Gediminas Technical University in Vilnius, Lithuania, where he was employed at the Physics Department from 2002 to 2015. He lectured in the field of mathematical modelling of physical processes for Master's students. From 2009, he was Certificated Professor of physical sciences of the Vilnius Gediminas' Technical University. After finishing his professional scientific career in 2015, he has also been working as an independent scientific researcher with main scientific field in physics of semiconductors and semiconductor nanostructures.

== Awards ==
In 2000, he was awarded the Lithuanian National Award in Science. In March 2001, he was awarded along with Professor Adolf Dargis and Dr. Neria Žurauskienė the National Award for Merit in Physical Sciences for the year 2000 for the series of papers Shock and Tunnel Ionization in Semiconductors.

== Selected bibliography ==
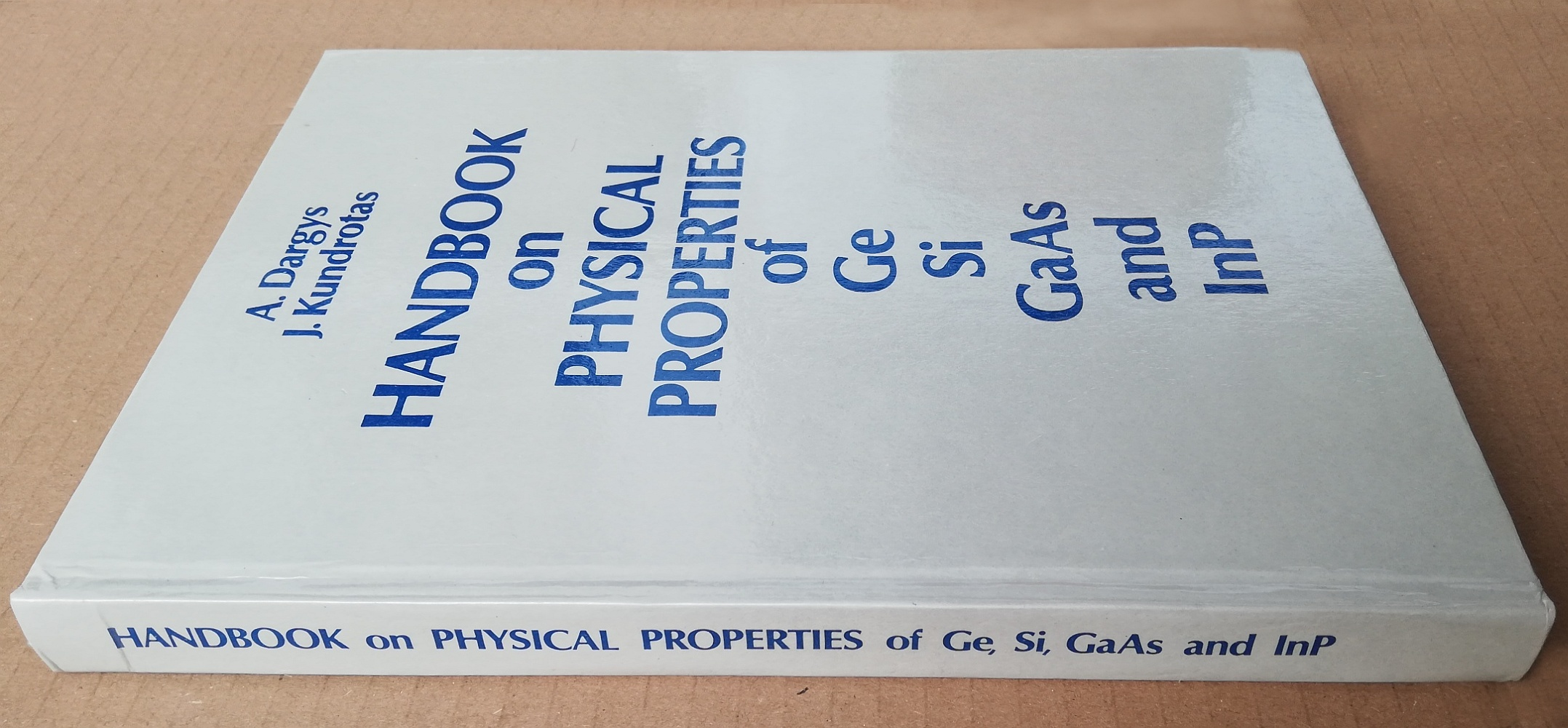
Co-author of Handbook of Physical Properties of Ge, Si, GaAs and InP

- Kundrotas, J.; Dargys, A. (1986). "Electron tunneling from an ultrathin quantum well in constant and alternating electric fields". Physica Status Solidi B. 134 (1). Wiley Online Library: 267–274. Bibcode:1986PSSBR.134..267K. doi:10.1002/pssb.2221340132.
- A micro-calculator for work and leisure (Mikrokalkuliatorius darbui ir poilsiui, 1986)
- Handbook on physical properties of Ge, Si, GaAs and InP. Open Library org. 1994.
- Kundrotas, J.; Dargys, A.; Cesna, A. (1996). "The hot electron distribution function under impurity breakdown conditions". Physica Status Solidi B. 194 (2). Wiley Online Library: 649–660. Bibcode:1996PSSBR.194..649K. doi:10.1002/pssb.2221940220.
- Kundrotas, J. (1999). "Impact ionization coefficient of excitons in n-GaAs". Semiconductor Science and Technology. 14 (5). IOP Science / Semiconductor Science and Technology: 461–464. Bibcode:1999SeScT..14..461K. doi:10.1088/0268-1242/14/5/016.
- Jurgis Kundrotas. GaAs/AlGaAs savybės (GaAs/AlGaAs properties), Puslaidininkių fizikos institutas (Institute of Semiconductor Physics), Vilnius (2001) 168 pages
- Kundrotas, J.; Čerškus, A.; Ašmontas, S.; Valušis, G.; Sherliker, B.; Halsall, M. P.; Steer, M. J.; Johannessen, E.; Harrison, P. (2005). "Excitonic and impurity-related optical transitions in Be δ-doped GaAs∕AlAs multiple quantum wells: Fractional-dimensional space approach". Physical Review B. 72 (23) 235322. Physical Review B (covering condensed matter and materials physics). Bibcode:2005PhRvB..72w5322K. doi:10.1103/PhysRevB.72.235322.
- Kundrotas, J.; Čerškus, A.; Ašmontas, S.; Valušis, G.; Halsall, M. P.; Johannessen, E.; Harrison, P. (2007). "Impurity-induced Huang–Rhys factor in beryllium δ-doped GaAs/AlAs multiple quantum wells: fractional-dimensional space approach". Semiconductor Science and Technology. 22 (9). IOP Science (Semiconductor Science and Technology): 1070–1076. Bibcode:2007SeScT..22.1070K. doi:10.1088/0268-1242/22/9/016.
- "Light emission lifetimes in p-type δ-doped GaAs/AlAs multiple quantum wells near the Mott transition". Journal of Applied Physics. 2012.
- Kundrotas, Jurgis; Čerškus, Aurimas; Valušis, Gintaras; Linfield, Edmund H.; Johannessen, Erik; Johannessen, Agne (21 January 2015). "Dynamics of free carriers – neutral impurity related optical transitions in Be and Si δ-doped GaAs/AlAs multiple quantum wells: Fractional-dimensional space approach". Lithuanian Journal of Physics. 54 (4). doi:10.3952/physics.v54i4.3012.
- Benas Kundrotas, Algis Jurgis Kundrotas. Modern Car Handbook. Vilnius (2020); 242 pages; ISBN 978-609-475-496-8
