= Constance DeJong (writer) =

American artist, writer, and performer

Constance DeJong (born 1944, in Ohio) is an American artist, writer, and performer. DeJong produces fiction texts and new media-based work for performance and theater, audio, and video installations. She has permanent audio installations in Beacon, NY, London, and Seattle. She is also known as the writer of the libretto of Philip Glass's opera Satyagraha, as well as her numerous collaborations with Tony Oursler on projects such as Fantastic Prayers. DeJong has exhibited internationally with projects produced by organizations such as the Dia Art Foundation and Minetta Brook. She was a professor of art and time-based media at Hunter College.

== Notable works ==
DeJong's writing is closely tied to performative practice. Her first book, Modern Love, was published in 1977 by Standard Editions, a short-lived imprint co-founded by DeJong and Dorothea Tanning. In 1978, this text was adapted into a 60-minute radio program accompanied by Modern Love Waltz, a piano composition by Philip Glass. A new facsimile edition was published in 2017 by Primary Information and Ugly Duckling Presse.

A subsequent work published in 1978, The Lucy Amarillo Stories, is a collection of poetry also read aloud by the artist in a 1977 performance at The Kitchen. Glass wrote a duet for flute and harmonica, titled Lucy's Music, for The Kitchen performances. The music was performed by Richard Landry and Ken Deifik.

Satyagraha was put into a new production at the Metropolitan Opera in New York in April, 2008. In 2006 she wrote the text for SuperVision, a collaboration with The Builder's Association which premiered at the Walker Art Center in Minneapolis and at the Brooklyn Academy of Music (BAM) in New York City.

In 2017, DeJong worked with Triple Canopy to produce NightWriters, a performance and digital artist's book.

== Selected writings ==
- I.T.I.L.O.E. Top Stories, 1983.
- Satyagraha, M.K. Gandhi in South Africa, 1893–1914. Tanam, 1983 (ISBN 0-934378-43-6).
- The Lucy Amarillo Stories. Standard, 1978 (ISBN 0-918746-03-5).
- Modern Love. Standard, 1977 (N7433.4.D44 1977).
- SpeakChamber. Bureau, 2013 (limited edition).
- Modern Love. Primary Information/Ugly Duckling, 2017 (ISBN 978-0-991558-52-0).
- NightWriters. Triple Canopy, 2017 (digital publication).
- Reader Primary Information, 2022 (ISBN 9781736534694)
