= Žemaičių Naumiestis =

- Town
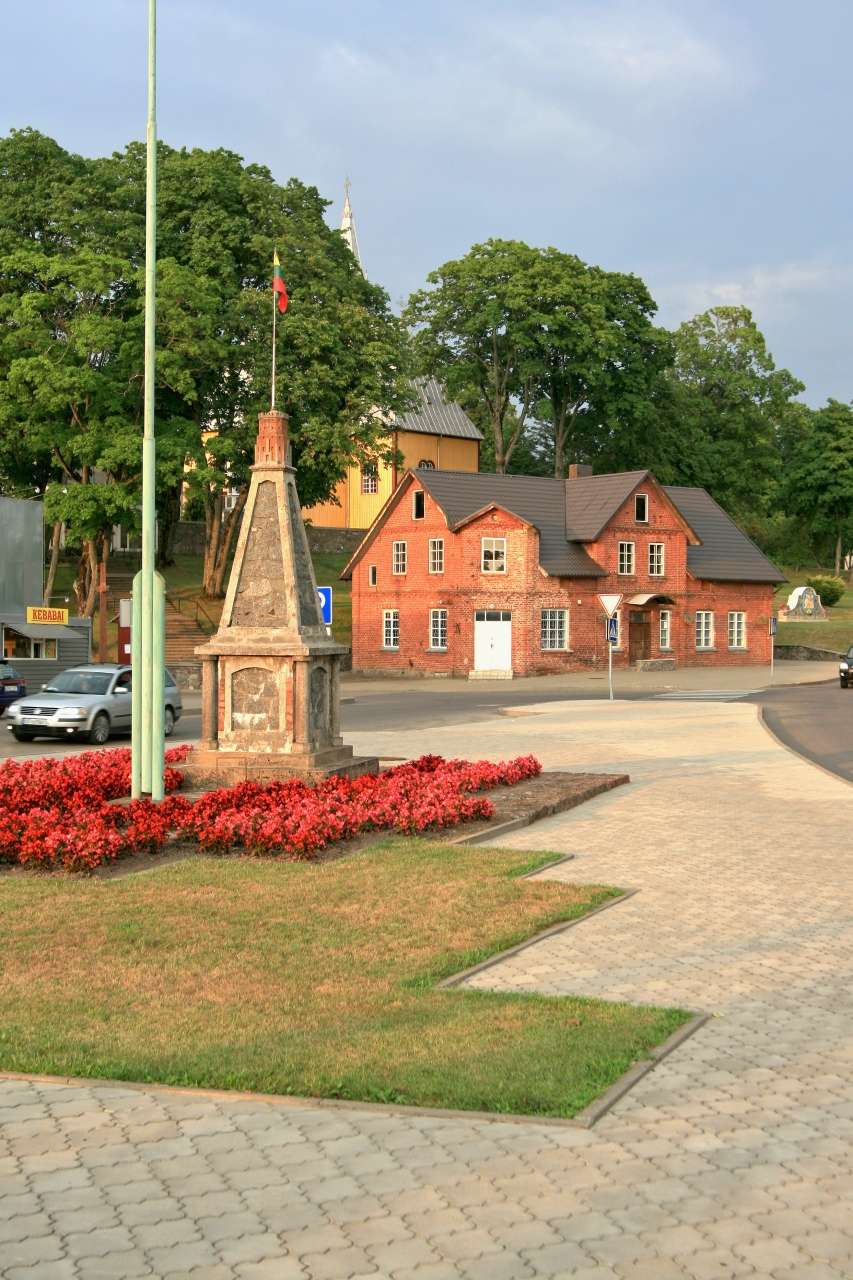
- Town centre

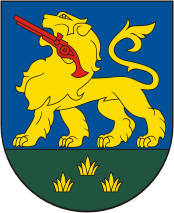
- Seal

- Location within Lithuania
- Coordinates: 55°21′30″N 21°42′0″E
- Country: Lithuania
- County: Klaipėda County

Population (2011)
  - Total: 1,373
- Time zone: UTC+2 (EET)
  - Summer (DST): UTC+3 (EEST)

Žemaičių Naumiestis (Polish: Nowe Miasto, Yiddish: ניישטאָט טאווריג, ניישטאָט סוגינט) is a town in Klaipėda county, Šilutė district municipality in western Lithuania, between Klaipėda and Kaliningrad Oblast. The rivers Šustis, Šelmuo and Lendra flow through it.

For centuries, it was located at the border to Prussia, creating its distinctly multicultural population. Besides Lithuanian inhabitants, its Jewish and German populations—and to some degree Russian—have played significant roles in its history. As a result of the multi-layered events at the eve of World War II, over the course of the war and in the first decade after the war, this multi-cultural population structure was destroyed. It is reflected exclusively in the architectural heritage of Žemaičių Naumiestis. There is the wooden Catholic St. Michael Church (built in 1782), a Protestant church made of stone (built in 1842) and a stone synagogue (built in 1816).

== Name ==
For a long time the town was called Naumiestis (Lithuanian) or Nowe Miasto (Polish). In Yiddish, the town was called Neishtot Sugint (referring to the closely located estate Sugint). Under tsarist rule, the town in 1884 was renamed Aleksandrovsk. This designation was officially valid until 1918. In the 1920s, the town was called Tauragės Naumiestis (Lithuanian) or Neishtot Tavrik (Yiddish) referring to the closely located town Tauragė as opposed to other Lithuanian towns by the name of Naumiestis. In the 1930s the designation Žemaičių Naumiestis was introduced and is valid until today.

== History ==
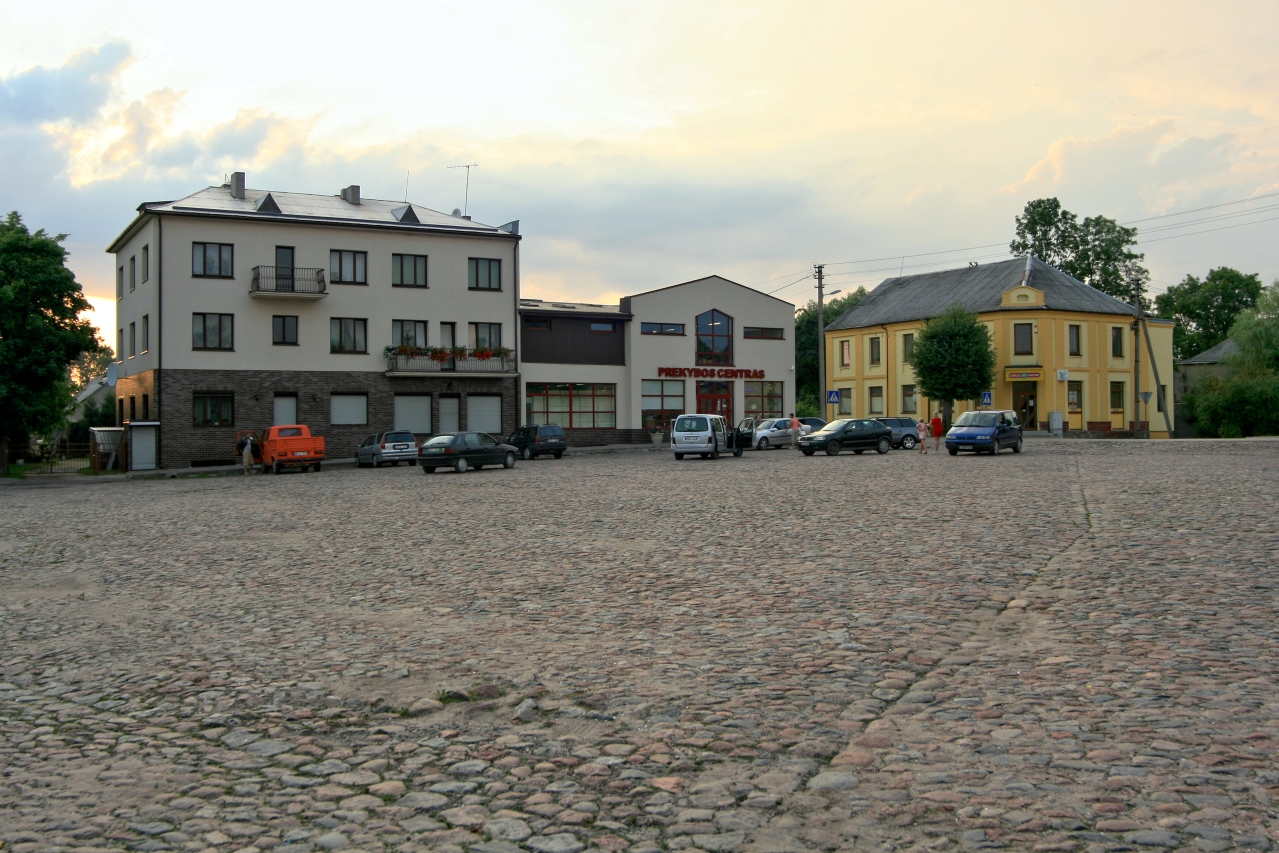
Žemaičių Naumiestis market square

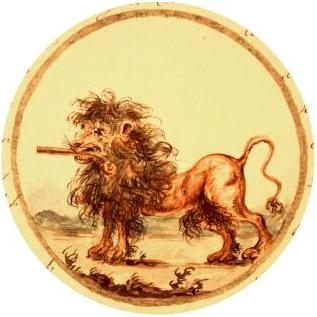
Coat of arms (1792)

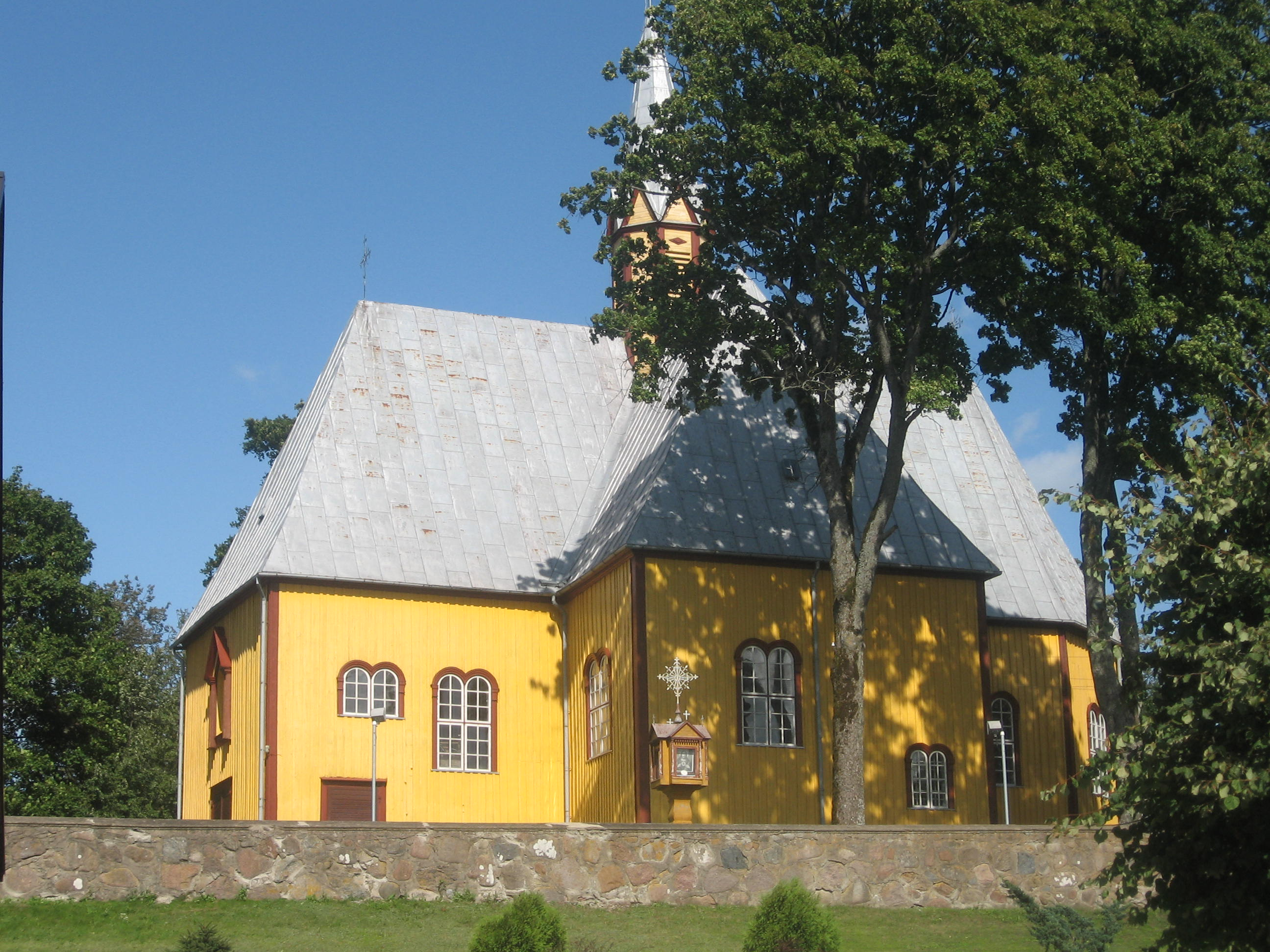
St. Michael the Archangel Church

The town was allegedly created by the Grand Master of the German Order, Winrich von Kniprode. In 1600 it was again mentioned as property of the crown. The town gained privileges for markets and trade fairs in 1750.

In 1779, King Stanisław August Poniatowski leased the town for 50 years to the nobleman Mykolas Rionikeris, who settled artisans in the town and had the Catholic Church St. Michael constructed. The king granted the town Magdeburg Rights and a coat-of-arms in 1792. With the third partition of Poland, the town fell to the Russian Empire, first belonging to Vilna governorate and then to Raseiniai district within the newly established Kovno governorate (1843).

Since 1795, the border between the Russian Empire and Prussia, which was located only three kilometres from the city, was increasingly fortified. A class-3 customs office was located in the town. In this time, the town was mainly known for its trade fairs and the market, which took place twice a week. Moreover, the town hosted a post station, as this was where the post lines Palanga-Tauragė and Sartininkai-Švėkšna met.

The town grew significantly in the second half of the 19th century, particularly as a result of cross-border trade. In 1860 there were 165 houses with 1,600 inhabitants in the town, most of them Jews. In 1897 the population had already increased to 2,445 inhabitants, 1,438 (59%) of whom were Jews. There were several shops and taverns, three mills and three workshops for leather stitching. The trade fairs and markets were highly popular. The town was an important location for the export of horses and timber.

Moreover, the town gained significance after the ban on Lithuanian press (1863–1864), as an important route of the book smugglers led through it.

At the outbreak of World War I in 1914, several houses were burnt down. From 1916 to 1918, the region (like all of Lithuania) was occupied by the German Army. After the end of World War I, Žemaičių Naumiestis belonged to the Republic of Lithuania.

After the town was occupied by the Red Army in summer 1940 and its incorporation into the USSR, businesses were nationalized. The German minority left the town in March 1941 on the basis of the German-Soviet resettlement agreement of 1941. On 14 June 1941, citizens of the town were exiled to Siberia. On the morning of 22 June 1941, the Wehrmacht entered Žemaičių Naumiestis. Heavy firing occurred, in the course of which 14 German soldiers were killed. Subsequently, the Wehrmacht arrested the majority of Jewish men and locked them in the Protestant church. The parish priest, however, managed to convince the German officers of the innocence of the Jews, and they were freed. After the occupation, the Germans established an "advanced border-supervision post" of the Reich Financial Administration (Reichsfinanzverwaltung). The Jews were put into a ghetto and shot after a short time. In summer 1942, a part of the German population returned.

In the time of Soviet Lithuania, a state domain and a professional school for agricultural education were located in Žemaičių Naumiestis.

=== Jews ===
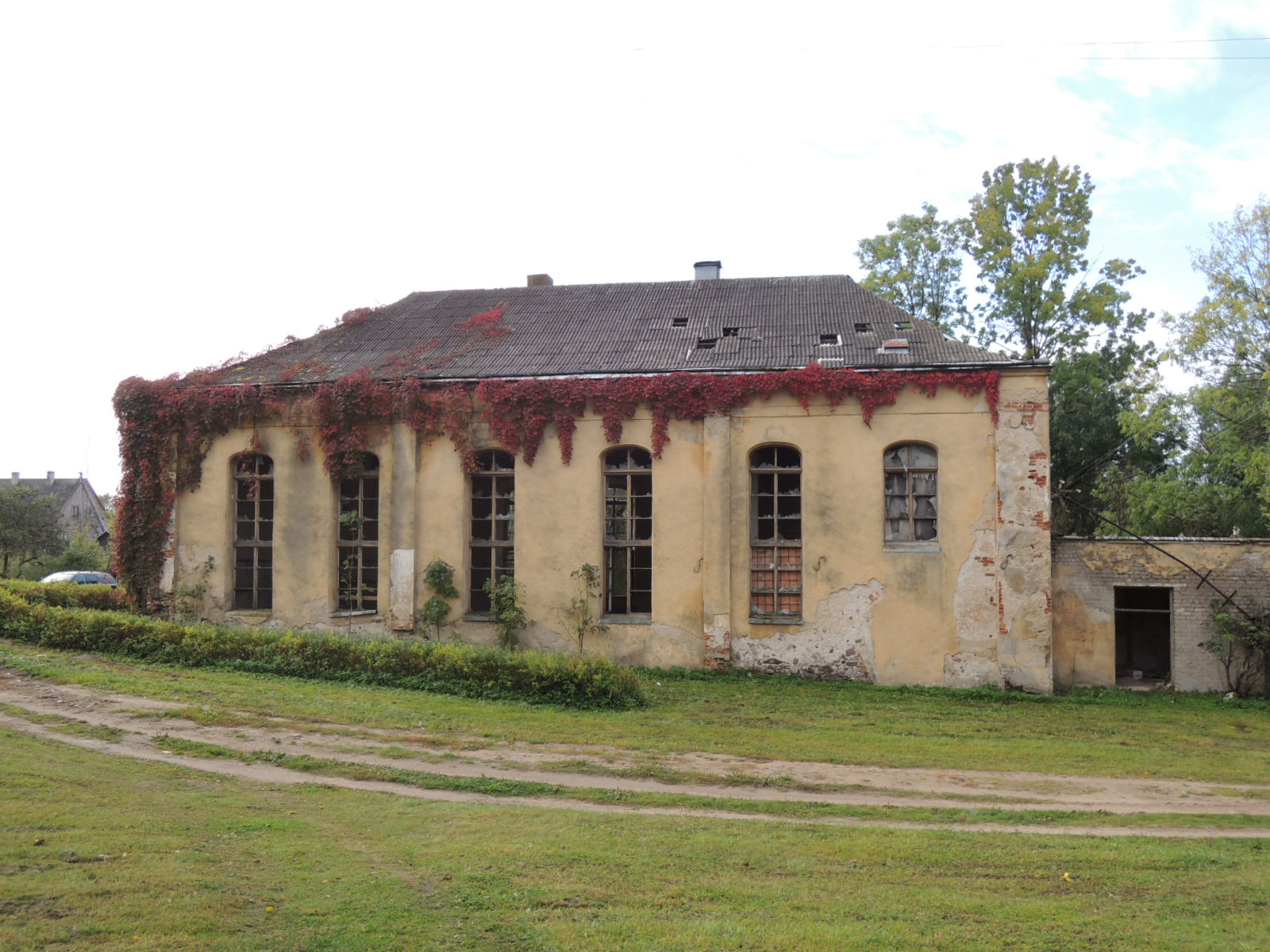
Former synagogue of Žemaičių Naumiestis

Jews lived in the town since the 17th century. An old Jewish cemetery was mentioned at the end of the 17th century. In the early 18th century, a Chevra Kaddisha was founded. There was a Jewish school, a synagogue and a prayer house.

Since the middle of the 19th century there were Jews who mainly traded in closely located East Prussia and subsequently settled there.; In the last third of the 19th century, a significant emigration movement set in. At first, several Jews emigrated to the United States. Later many emigrated to South Africa.

After the Wehrmacht occupied Žemaičių Naumiestis in June 1941, a local headquarters (Ortskommandantur) was established on the market square, where male Jews had to register every day. Many were employed in street cleaning; others in German army bakeries. Moreover, they had to bury those soldiers who had fallen on the first day of combat. In June 1941 already, the Jews were physically forced with kicks and blows to bring out the inventory of the synagogue including scrolls and banks into the yard and burn it there. In the beginning of 1941, the Jews were assigned flats on a certain street. They were required to wear a yellow stripe on their clothes and were banned from using sidewalks.

On 19 July 1941, the SS of Heydekrug, under the direction of Werner Scheu, organized a second "Action to acquire Jews" (Judenbeschaffungsaktion). Its target was Žemaičių Naumiestis, 14 km east of Heydekrug, and thus one of the few towns in the northern border strip, where no killings of Jews had occurred so far. On 19 July 1941, all male Jews of 14 years and older were ordered into the synagogue. There they were awaited by SS men and Lithuanian policeman. All men were loaded onto trucks and brought to the barracks east of the town. The elderly and sick, ca. 70 persons, were separated and shot on the very same day in Šiaudvyčiai. The shooters were Lithuanian policemen. Overall, at least 220 Jewish men were shot on that day. The persons selected as fit for work were brought among others into the camp Schillwen near Heydekrug.

In September 1941, the Jewish women and children were brought to Šiaudvyčiai and shot. The Jewish men were forced to work for two years in different camps in the vicinity of Heydekurg. Those who became sick or unfit for work were shot by the SS. At the end of July 1943, the camps were disbanded and the remaining men transported to Auschwitz. Only very few survived. Some Jews from Žemaičių Naumiestis, who had survived the war in the Soviet Union and returned to their home in 1946, were killed when their houses were demolished.

=== Germans ===
At the end of the 18th century, the nobleman Mykolas Rionikeris settled Protestant artisans from close by East Prussia in Žemaičių Naumiestis. In this time, the border was permeable. The community members were running their own school as early as 1800. The church community was at first tended to by Prussian priests and in 1800 became a Chapel of ease of the parish Tauroggen. 327 members of the Protestant community lived in the town in 1824. Usually the cantor conducted the church services. The prayer house burned town twice at the beginning of the 19th century. A church was erected in 1842 from donations. In 1919, the community received its first pastor. When the Germans were evacuated in 1941, community life came to a halt. After the end of the war, a part of the German inhabitants returned. A new Protestant community was founded in 1947. In 1958–1960, the community was again severely depleted as a result of emigration on the basis of the exit agreement between the Soviet Union and the Federal Republic of Germany.

== People from Žemaičių Naumiestis ==
- Martynas Mažvydas (c. 1510 – 1563), Protestant priest and author of the first book in Lithuanian language
- Solomon Ben Kalman Halevi Abel (1857–1886), one of the founders of the Yeshiva of Telšiai
- Eliyahu Ragoler (1794–1849) rabbi, author of several works
- Sammy Marks (1844–1920) entrepreneur and financier in South Africa
- Hermann Kallenbach (1871–1945) architect and owner of the Tolstoy farm
- Eglė Bendikaitė (born 1976), historian and lecturer in Yiddish
- Algis Jurgis Kundrotas (born 1950) Professor, Doctor of Natural Sciences, Dr. Habil. of Physical Sciences, Lithuanian National Award in Science
