= Shimon Lev =

Israeli multidisciplinary artist

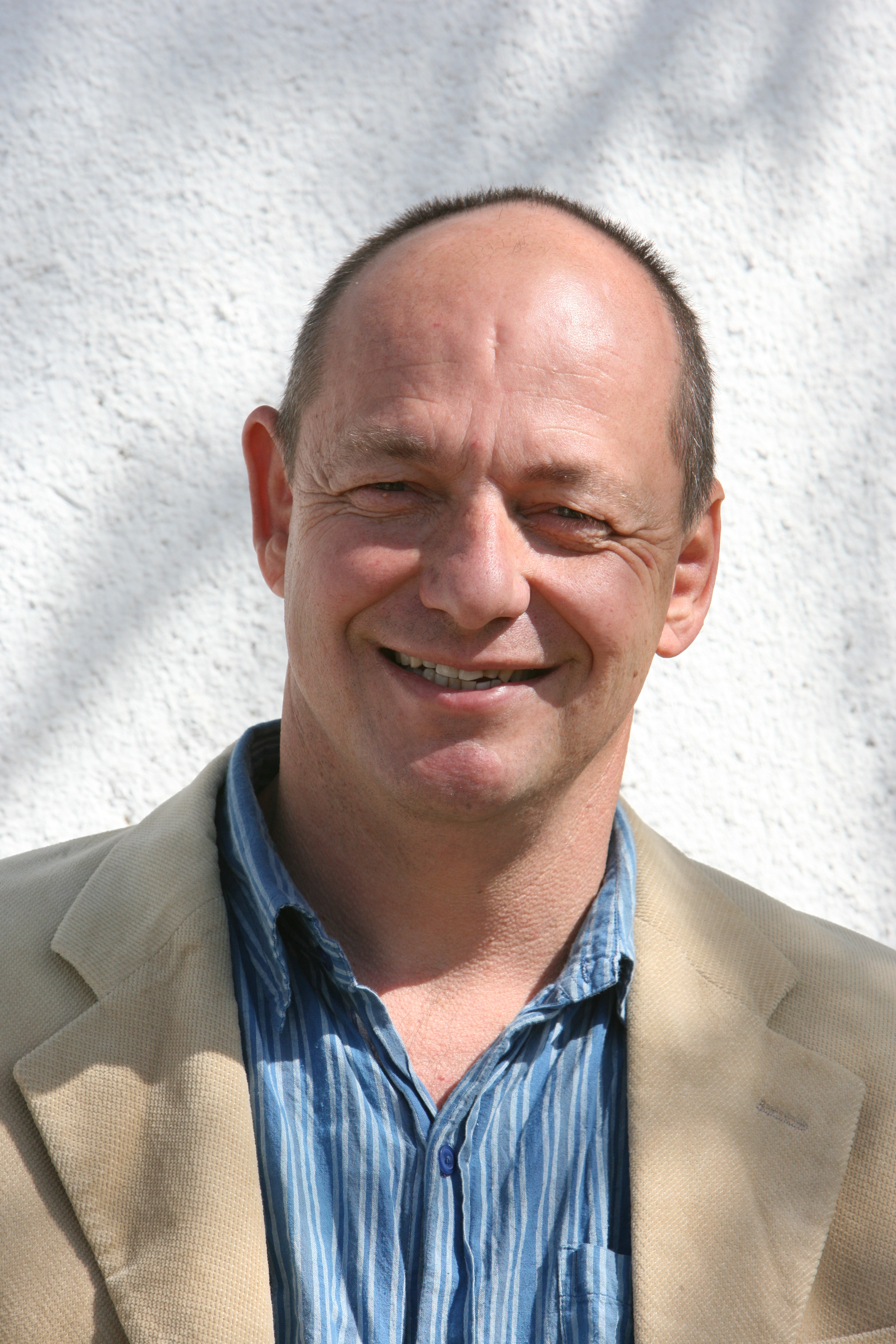
Shimon Lev (Low)

Shimon Lev (Low) (Hebrew: שמעון לב; born August 1, 1962) is an Israeli multidisciplinary artist, writer, photographer, curator and researcher in the fields of Indian Studies, art and literature, religion, and travel. He holds a Doctoral degree on the subject of the mutual influence of the Jewish and Indian cultures. Lev teaches at the Hadassah Academic College.

Lev is the author of "Soulmates", the story of Mahatma Gandhi and Hermann Kallenbach (Orient BlackSwan, 2012), the first comprehensive study analyzing the unique and enigmatic relationship between Gandhi and his closest intimate friend and supporter, Hermann Kallenbach, in the context of his developing in his formative years in South Africa, and in the understanding of his relationship to the Zionist movement. The Hindu found it "insightful" and "a valuable addition to Gandhi studies for the historian". In particular the book debunks the idea that Gandhi and Kallenbach had a homosexual relationship.

Following the publication of the unique relationships between Gandhi and Kallenbach in "Soulmates", The Government of Lithuania decided to put a statue of the two men in the city of Rusnė in the republic.

Lev also wrote "Vesheyodea Lishol" (Hebrew for "And He who Knows how to Ask", Xargol Publisher, Israel 1998), which is a collection of life stories of people who abandoned the Jewish Orthodox religion, written in a form of monologues.

== Education ==
Shimon Lev studied photography at the Hadassah Academic College, Jerusalem (graduated 1988). He earned B.A.degree and M.A. Degree (Cum Laude), Faculty of Humanities (2010), the Hebrew University of Jerusalem. He earned his Doctorate from the Hebrew University of Jerusalem in 2016. His dissertation is about the cultural and political meeting between the Jewish world and the Indian World – A comparative research in light of the Indian and Zionist national movements.

== Books ==
=== Author ===
- Soulmates – The Story of Mahatma Gandhi and Hermann Kallenbach, Gandhi Studies Serial, Black Swan Publishing House, India 2012.
- Gideon in a Barral on Top of the World, in: The Life I would Love to Live - Twenty Israeli Travel Stories (Hebrew), Moshe Gilad (editor), Am Oved Publisher, 2003.
- Vesheyodea Lishol (Hebrew for "And He who Knows how to Ask"), Xargol Publishers, 1998 (in the list of Haaretz Daily best sellers, 1998).
- Clear are the Paths of India: The Cultural and Political Encounter Between Indians and Jews in the Context of their Respective National Movements. 2018. Based on Lev's Doctoral thesis.
- From Lithuania to Santiniketan: Schlomith Flaum & Rabindranath Tagore. Iithuanian Embassy in New Delhi, New Delhi, 2018

=== Photographer ===
- "Mor'e Derech" (Hebrew for: "Travel Guide"), Menachem Markus (writer), Mapa Publishing, 2009.
- "Das Land der Bible," Wolfgang Sottil (writer), Styria, Gratz, Austria 1995.

=== Academic Editor ===
- Gandhi, M.K. "Shilton Atzmi" (Hebrew for: "Home Rule"), with Tolstoy's "Letter to a Hindu". Adam Olam, Tel Aviv 2016; Hebrew edition of Hind Swaraj or Indian Home Rule. Including a paper by the editor.
- Satygraha in South Africa, autobiography by M. K Gandhi, Hebrew version, Babel 2014.
- The Camera Man - Women and Men Photographing Jerusalem 1900- 1950, Exhibition Catalog. Tower of David Museum, 2016. Including a paper by the editor.

== Art ==
Lev has produced 28 exhibitions worldwide, and participated in more than 50 others. In addition, he contributed photographs for a number of art books. He also directed three television films.

In an exhibition summarizing one hundred years of photography in the Land of Israel, Lev was chosen to represent the 1990s.

In 2014 Lev created, together with the Austrian artist Friedemann Derschmidt, an exhibition of photographs, video clips and Performance art about his father's family, titled "Two Family Archives". Derschmidt exhibited documents and photography works of his own family, some of whom have been Nazi party members. Following the exhibit, Lev reported, a few of them boycotted the artist and threatened to file charges against him. The exhibition received broad coverage.

Lev was the chief curator, researcher and catalogue editor for the historical research exhibition at the Tower of David Museum, Jerusalem: "The Camera Men: Women and Men Photograph Jerusalem, 1900–1950", May 2016.

== Papers ==
Among his published papers are:

- Gandhi and his Jewish Theosophist Supporters in South Africa, in: Chajes, J. and Huss B, (Editors). Theosophical Appropriations, Goren Goldstein Library of Jewish Thought, Ben Gurion University Press (forthcoming, 2016).
- "Melting Hitler's 'Heart of Stone' - Gandhi's Attitude to the Holocaust," The Journal of Judeo Indo Studies, Vol. 13, 2013 (German version in: SudAsien 33. Jahrgang, Nr. 3/2013).
- "From a Failing Lawyer to A Mass Movement Leader," Article and academic editing of the Hebrew translation to "Gandhi's Satyagraha in South Africa," Babel, 2014.
- "Changing a Tiger with another Tiger" (Hebrew), "Haokets", May 6, 2012.
- "Laga'at Baor" ("Hebrew for "Touching Skin"), a short story, "Massa Acher" Magazine, 1999.

“Clear Are the Paths of India”: The Representation of Tagore in Jewish Literature, The Journal of Indo-Judaic Studies (2017). “Tolstoy Farm”, Zemanin, special volume on India, vol. 122 (2013), The Open University (Hebrew). “Objekte der Erinnerung" in: Friedemann Derschmidt, (Edt) Sag Du Deinem Kinde! Natinonal-sozialismus in der eigenen Familie, Vienna: Löcker, 2015, (German), 296-329.

== Films ==
- "The Heart of the Memory" (Director), Jewish Eye Festival, Tel Aviv Cinematheque, 2005.
- "Berliner City Tour" (Director), independent, 1999.
- "The Sons of David," Co-director with Ido Glass, a Documentary (Israeli TV Channel 1, 1998).
- "Bei uns nichts Neues" (German for: "No news on our side"; Director and Producer)

== Family ==
Shimon Lev is the son of Ze’ev Lev (Low), a physicist, Torah scholar, and founder of the Jerusalem College of Technology. Shimon Lev has three children: Gideon, Tamar and Ilay, and he lives in Yafo (Jaffa), Israel.
