= Naujamiestis Eldership (Panevėžys) =

Eldership of Lithuania

The Naujamiestis Eldership (Panevėžys) (Lithuanian: Naujamiesčio seniūnija) is an eldership of Lithuania, located in the Panevėžys District Municipality. In 2021 its population was 2320.
