= Hermann Kallenbach =

South African architect (1871–1945)

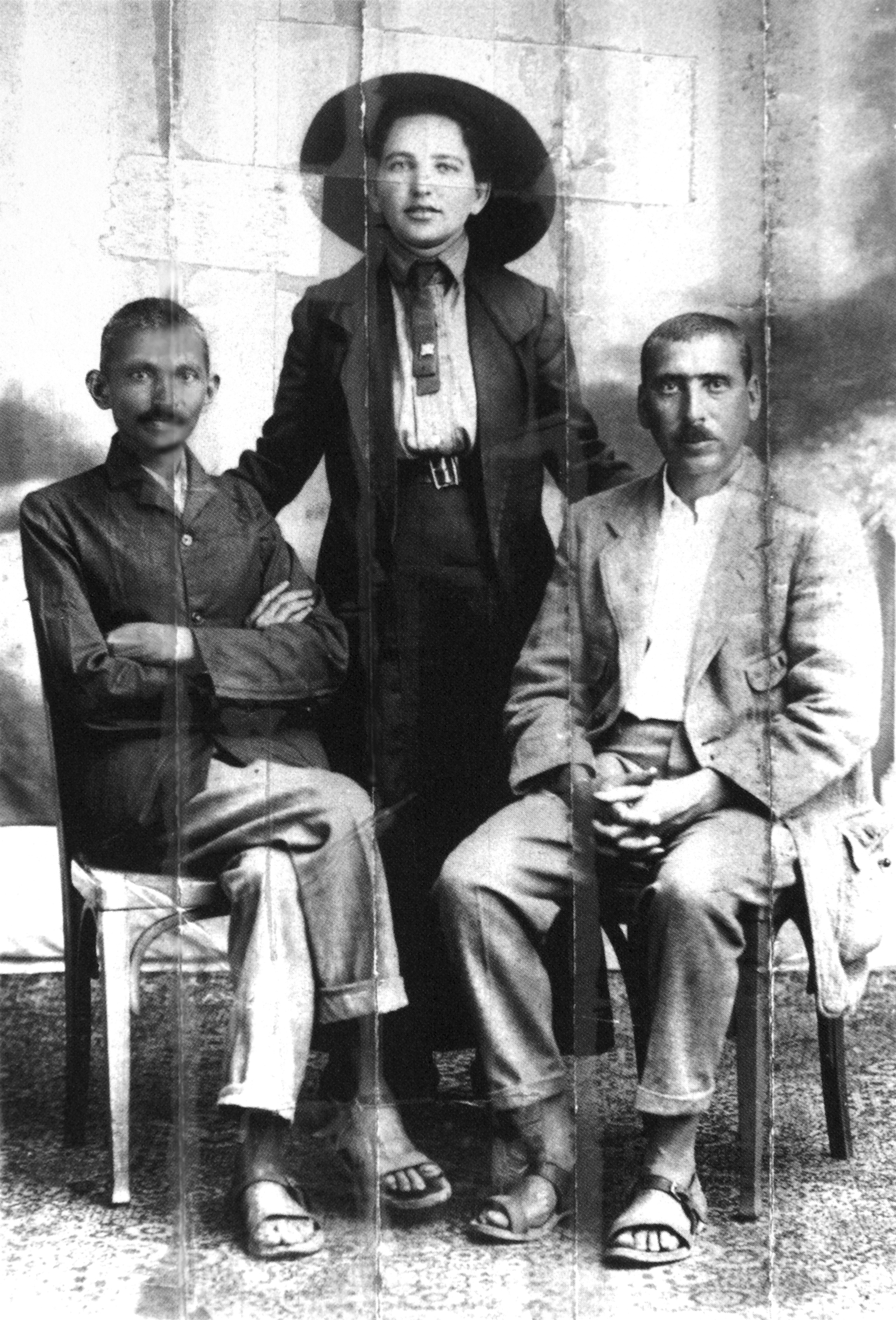
- Mahatma Gandhi, Sonja Schlesin, and Kallenbach in 1913
- Born: 1 March 1871; Naumiestis, Kovno Governorate, Russian Empire
- Died: 25 March 1945 (aged 74); Johannesburg, Transvaal, Union of South Africa
- Resting place: Kibbutz Degania, Israel

Hermann Kallenbach (1 March 1871 – 25 March 1945) was a Lithuanian-born Jewish South African architect who was one of the foremost friends and associates of Mahatma Gandhi. Kallenbach was introduced to the young Mohandas Gandhi while they were both working in South Africa and, after a series of discussions, they developed a long-lasting association.

== Early life ==
Kallenbach was born in 1871 in Žemaičių Naumiestis, Lithuania (then part of the Russian Empire) as the third eldest out of seven children. His father, Kalman Leib Kallenbach, was a Hebrew teacher and, later, a timber merchant. Hermann's childhood centered on education, sports and friendships with the village youth. He would later study architecture in Stuttgart and Munich. In 1896, he went to South Africa to join his uncles in Johannesburg, where he practiced as an architect and became a South African citizen. A skilled ice-skater, swimmer, cyclist, and gymnast, and successful architect, Kallenbach acquired considerable property in South Africa. Yet a major transformation in his life took place after he met Mahatma Gandhi.

== With Gandhi in South Africa ==
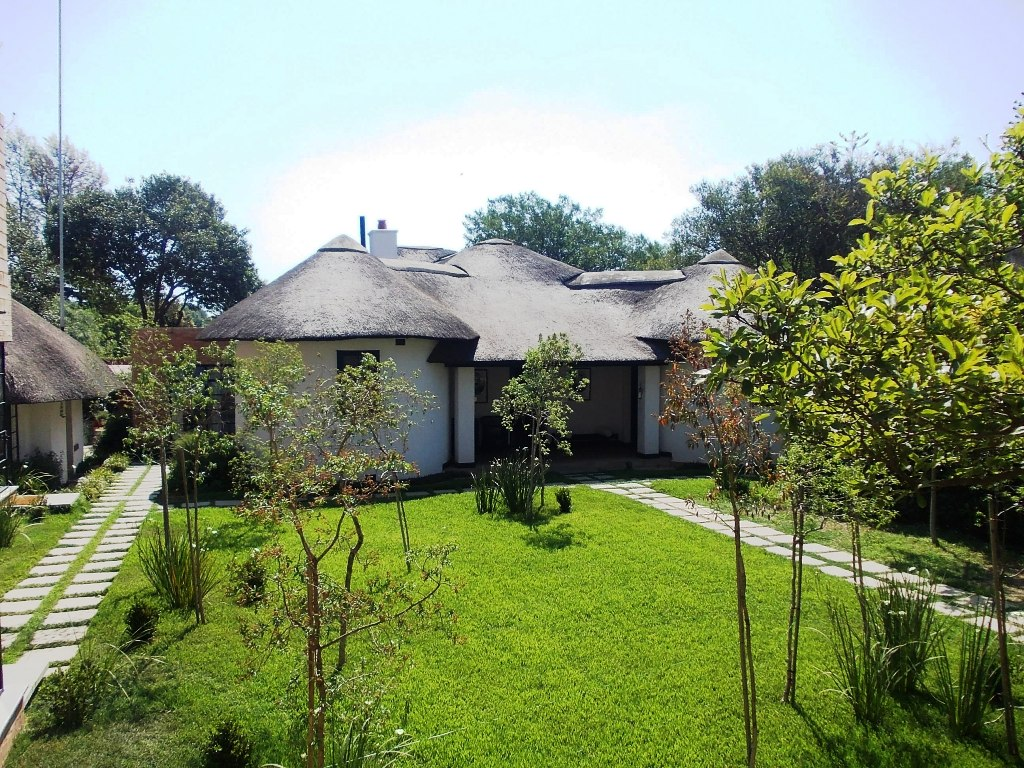
The house that Kallenbach designed for himself and Gandhi.

In 1904 he met Gandhi, who was then working in South Africa. They had long discussions on religious and other issues. He was highly influenced by Gandhi's ideas of satyagraha and equality among human beings and became his friend and a dedicated devotee. In Gandhi's words, they became "soulmates" and, for a time, shared what is now called Satyagraha House. This was a house designed by Kallenbach for them both to live together.

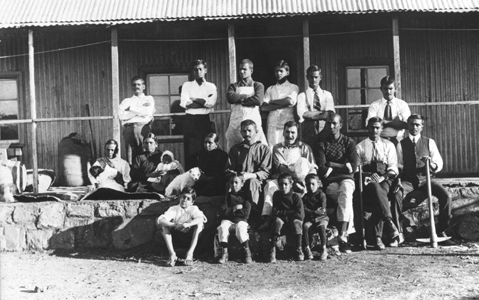
Kallenbach, Gandhi (sitting, 4th & 5th f.r.) and Tolstoy Farm members, 1910

In 1910 Kallenbach, then a rich man, donated to Gandhi a 1,100-acre (4.5 km^{2}) farm belonging to him near Johannesburg. The farm was used to run Gandhi's famous Tolstoy Farm that housed the families of satyagrahis. Kallenbach himself named this farm after Leo Tolstoy as he was deeply influenced by Tolstoy's writings and philosophy. On this farm, Kallenbach abandoned the life of a wealthy, sport-loving bachelor, adopting the simple lifestyle, vegetarian diet and equality politics of Gandhi. Henry Polak was another close friend and follower of Gandhi. Kallenbach was associated with Gandhi throughout the Satyagraha (non-violent resistance) struggle, which lasted in South Africa until 1914.

Kallenbach also accompanied Gandhi in his first penitential fast at Phoenix in 1913 over the "moral lapse" of two inmates. Also, Kallenbach acted as a manager during Gandhi's 1907–13 satyagraha movement in South Africa culminating in the 1913 Epic March. He also accompanied Gandhi and his wife on their final voyage from South Africa to London in 1914. Gandhi and Kallenbach used to call each other "Upper House" and "Lower House" respectively, the Lower House being a metaphor for preparing the budget, and the Upper House for vetoing it.

== As a Zionist ==
Kallenbach planned to accompany Gandhi to India in 1914, but with the outbreak of World War I, he was interned as an enemy alien at detention camps and shifted to the Isle of Man as a prisoner of war from 1915 until 1917. After the war he returned to South Africa, where he resumed his work as an architect and continued to correspond with Gandhi. The rise of Nazism and Hitler's antisemitic propaganda shocked Kallenbach into a rediscovery of his Jewish roots. He became a Zionist and served on the Executive Board of the South African Zionist Federation and planned to settle in Palestine ("Ereẓ Israel" in Hebrew). He wanted society there to involve no state, military, or industry, in order to avoid colonialism through Zionist settlements. At the request of Moshe Shertok (Sharett), Kallenbach visited Gandhi in May 1937 to enlist his sympathy and support for Zionism. The architect once again became a simple man, participating in all the activities of Gandhi's ashram life. Kallenbach wrote, "I join the whole programme. ... It is 'almost' as the old joint life, as if the 23 years, with all the events that affected millions of people, had disappeared." Kallenbach disagreed with Gandhi over Zionism and the need to violently resist Hitler. Nevertheless, Kallenbach continued his deep friendship with Gandhi, visiting him again in 1939.

== Death and legacy ==
Kallenbach died in 1945. He left a portion of his considerable estate for South African Indians, but the bulk was left for the benefit of Zionism. His large collection of books went to the Hebrew University of Jerusalem, and his cremated remains were buried at Kibbutz Degania in Israel.

Kallenbach was one of the foremost associates and friends of Gandhi, devoting a major part of his life to following his principles and ideals. Gandhi has frequently mentioned him in his autobiography, where he explains how Kallenbach was his 'soulmate' in the early days of the development of his personality and ideology.

A biography of Hermann Kallenbach, written by Isa Sarid, the daughter of his niece Hanna Lazar and Christian Bartolf, depicts Kallenbach's personality and his friendship with Gandhi very deeply. In his book, Great Soul: Mahatma Gandhi and His Struggle With India, Joseph Lelyveld quotes Tridip Suhrud, a cultural historian, as claiming: "They were a couple." This statement has proven controversial. Nevertheless, Gandhi's correspondence with Kallenbach shows the deep mutual respect they had for each other, and how they had affected each other's ideas. The Indian Government purchased the Gandhi-Kallenbach Archives to prevent their auction by Sotheby's in July 2012. The Indian government has stated that the purchase of the private correspondence of their cultural and socio-philosophical leader was to prevent it from being auctioned for profit.

A book by the writer and photographer Shimon Lev, Soulmates: The Story of Mahatma Gandhi and Hermann Kallenbach, (Orient BlakSwan, 2012) depicts the relationships between the two idealists, and Gandhi's attitude towards Zionism.

In Richard Attenborough's film, Gandhi, Kallenbach was played by Günther Maria Halmer.

On 2 October 2015, Gandhi's 146th birth anniversary, Lithuanian Prime Minister Algirdas Butkevičius and Indian Minister of State for Agriculture Mohanbhai Kundariya unveiled a statue of Kallenbach and Gandhi in Rusnė.

== See also ==
- Charles Freer (Charlie) Andrews
- Gandhi (film)
- Totaram Sanadhya
- Hirangaon
- Gandhi (TV series)
