= Satyagraha House =

Museum and guest house in Johannesburg, South Africa

Gandhi House
- Satyagraha House
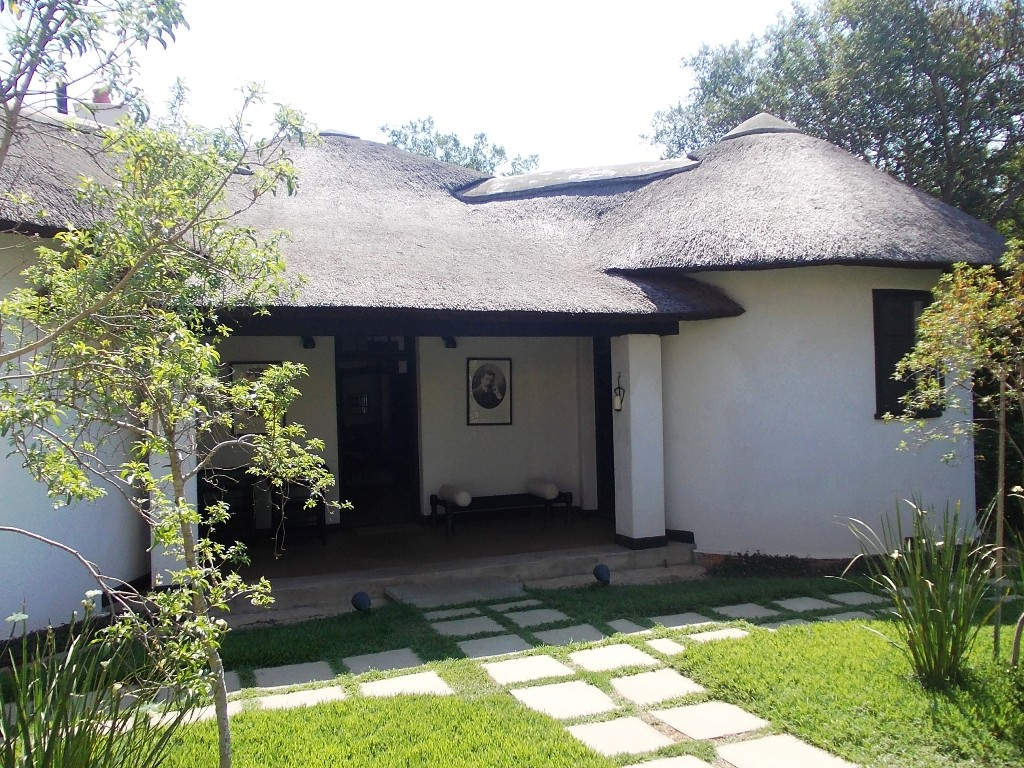
- the Kraal
- Established: 1 January 2007
- Location: 15 Pine Road, Orchards, Johannesburg
- Coordinates: 26.152539°S 28.074392°E
- Type: Johannesburg's historical heritage
- Curator: Lauren Segal
- Owner: Voyageurs du Monde / Original Travel
- Website: satyagrahahouse.com

Satyagraha House, commonly known as Gandhi House, is a museum and guest house located in Johannesburg. The house belonged to Mahatma Gandhi: he lived and worked there between 1908 and 1909. It is registered as part of Johannesburg's historical heritage. Satyagraha means insistence on truth. The house was designed by the architect Hermann Kallenbach for Gandhi and himself.

== History ==
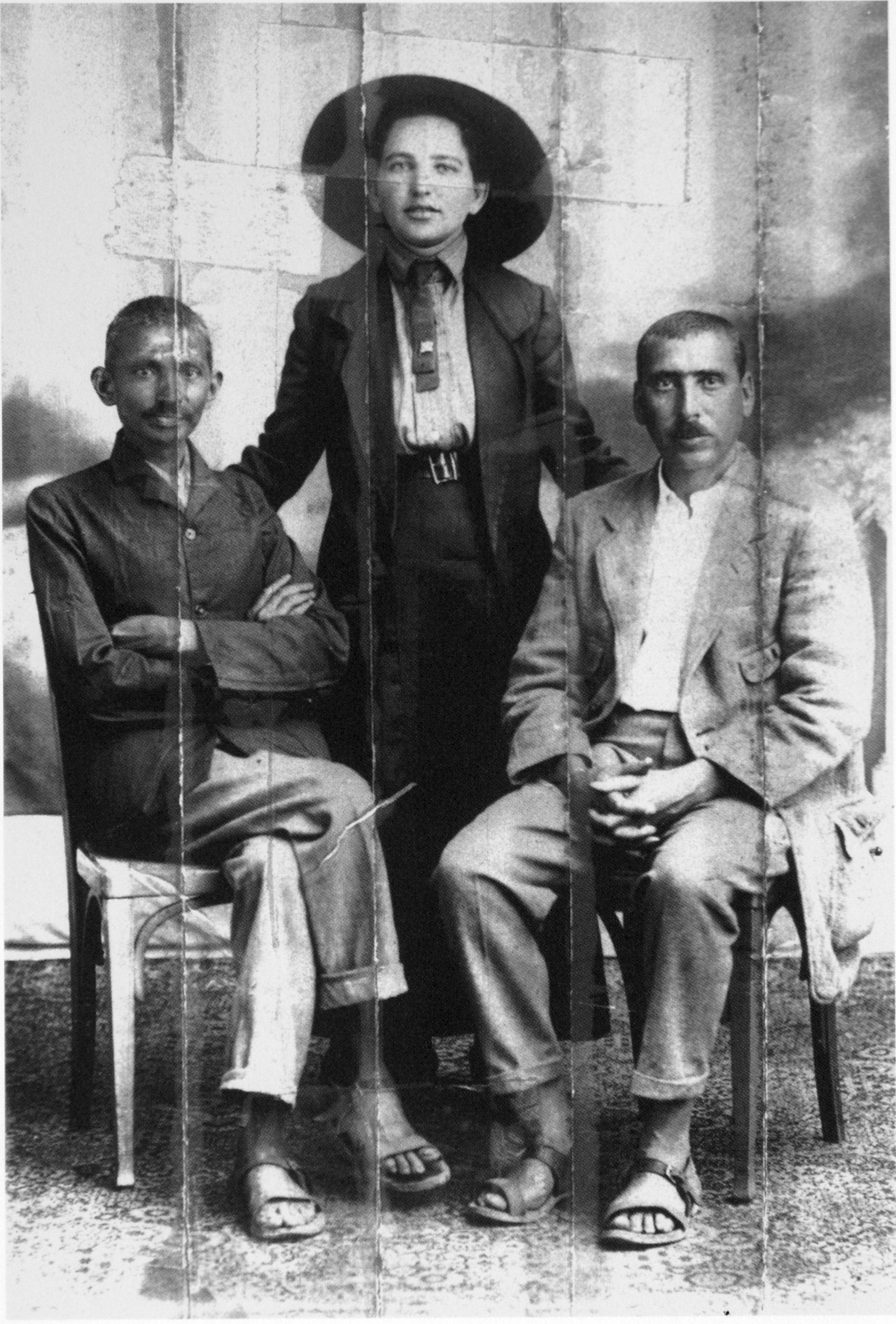
Gandhi, Sonia Schlesin (Gandhi's secretary), Hermann Kallenbach

Gandhi spent 21 years in South Africa, from 1893 until 1914, although he made visits to India and the UK during that time. It is said that Gandhi first learnt about racial discrimination when he was arrested at Pietermaritzburg railway station for travelling in a whites only wagon.

In 1904, Gandhi met Hermann Kallenbach, a Lithuanian-Jewish architect who had arrived in the country in 1896. In 1907, Kallenbach designed a house that was based on the shape of two local huts (rondavels) but made with European building methods. It was named the Kraal (barn in Afrikaans). The house had stables and a tennis court, but both of them led a life of meditation and chastity. Gandhi slept in an attic room which he entered via a ladder, but he and Kallenbach shared the same kitchen and entertained their guests in the living room. The houses did not have connecting doors, and it was necessary to leave one house in order to enter the other. Kallenbach's life was transformed by their life together and the money that he spent on himself was cut to a tenth of its initial figure. They left in 1909, and the house had several owners before being bought in 2009 by the French travel company Voyageurs du Monde to the chagrin of the Government of India who wanted to acquire it as an Indian national monument. The French company had it restored and opened it to the public as a museum and guest house in 2011.

The museum is managed by Lauren Segal, who also manages other museums, including the Apartheid Museum. Satyagraha means "truth force", a reference to the concept of non-violent resistance developed by Gandhi when he lived in South Africa.
