= Užšustis =

Coordinates: 55°21′36″N 21°40′52″E

Užšustis is a village in Šilutė district municipality, Lithuania. The name "Užšustis" literally means "beyond the Šustis", a reference to a river in the district.

The Užšustis cemetery, also known as "Ruskalva", is a site of cultural heritage.
